= List of New York State Historic Markers in Warren County, New York =

This is a complete list of New York State Historic Markers in Warren County, New York.

== Listings county-wide ==
	Marker name	Image	Date designated	Location	City or Town	Marker text
1	Diamond Island			On Diamond Island in L. George	Bolton, New York	In center of lake, military depot of Burgoyne's Army, attacked, Sept. 1777, by Americans under Col. Brown; Later abandoned by enemy.
2	Half Way Brook			On US 9 At Northern End Of City	Glens Falls, New York	Midway between Fort Edward and Fort George. On this site about 1755 stood a blockhouse enclosed by a stockade.
3	Pass to Trout Brook			On NYS 8 & NYS 9N About 1 Mile North Of Hague	Hague, New York	Through This Pass To Trout Brook Was An Indian Trail Used By Robert Rogers After Battle On Snowshoes, 1758, On Retreat To Ft. William Henry
4	Fort William Henry			On Lake Front, L. George Vlge.	Lake George, New York	Fort Wm. Henry 1755 Built By Sir Wm. Johnson 1757 After A Gallant Defense Col. Monroe In Command Surrendered To The French Under Gen. Montcalm.
5	Montcalm's Camp, 1757			On US 9 At Lake George Vlge.	Lake George, New York	On These Grounds Montcalm's Army Camped During The Siege Of Fort Wm. Henry August 6–9, 1757
6	The Hospital at Battle Of Lake George			On State Reservation At Lake George Village	Lake George, New York	Many Wounded Soldiers And Some With Smallpox Were Cruelly Murdered By Indians Of Montcalm's Army
7	Five Mile Run			On US 9 About 2½ Miles North Of Glens Falls	Queensbury, New York	In French And Indian War This Run Was Avoided Because Of Fear Of Attack By Hidden Indians. Name Changed To Meadow Run 1808.
8	Military Road			On US 9 About 4½ Miles North Of Glens Falls	Queensbury, New York	Between Fort Edward And Lake George Built By Sir William Johnson During The Summer Of 1755.
9	Oneida			On NYS 9L About 3½ Miles North Of Glens Falls	Queensbury, New York	Named For Tom Hammond, A Half Breed Oneida Indian A Thriving Settlement Doing A Large Lumbering Business At Close Of Revolution.
10	James Cameron			On Co. Rd. About 5 Miles West Of Warrensburg	Thurman, New York	Pioneer Woodsman Farmer, Justice Of The Peace, Settled In This Valley In 1773. Buried 100 Feet West Of This Marker.
11	Weber Furlong	New York State Historic Marker	Tuesday, July 23, 2013	The left side of City Hall on 42 Ridge Street Glens Falls, 12801 next to the Sidewalk	Glens Falls, New York	Weber Furlong (1878 – 1962) One of America's great and influential artists of the twentieth century, Weber Furlong was among the first to champion the Modern art movement. The final years of her life were spent in Glens Falls, where she lived and taught near this site at her Ridge Street studio until her death in 1962. Placed for the Warren County Bicentennial.

== See also ==
- List of New York State Historic Markers
- National Register of Historic Places listings in New York
- List of National Historic Landmarks in New York
