= Golden Heart Farm =

- Location within New York

General information
- Location: Bolton Landing, New York
- Coordinates: 43°33′26″N 73°39′17″W

Golden Heart Farm is a private residence in the hamlet of Bolton Landing, New York, in the United States. It served as the art colony of Thomas and Weber Furlong from 1921 to 1962. Artists from Manhattan came to the art colony to study with Wilhelmina Weber Furlong of the Art Students League of New York

== History ==
Warren Counties Golden Heart Farm was the residence of the Thomas and Wilhelmina Weber Furlong. The artist chose the name for her colony while living in New York City. Thomas Furlong was an accomplished muralist and realist painter. His wife Wilhelmina Weber Furlong was a major American modern artist. The farm house was built in the 1860s by Rufus Randall, a veteran of the Civil War, upon his return home. Randall cleared and farmed the land and raised his family there before selling the property to another Bolton man, Edson Persons. The farm was reputed to have “one of the most magnificent views of the lake in the vicinity,” according to a newspaper clipping from 1961.
