= Warren County, New York =

County in New York, United States

- County
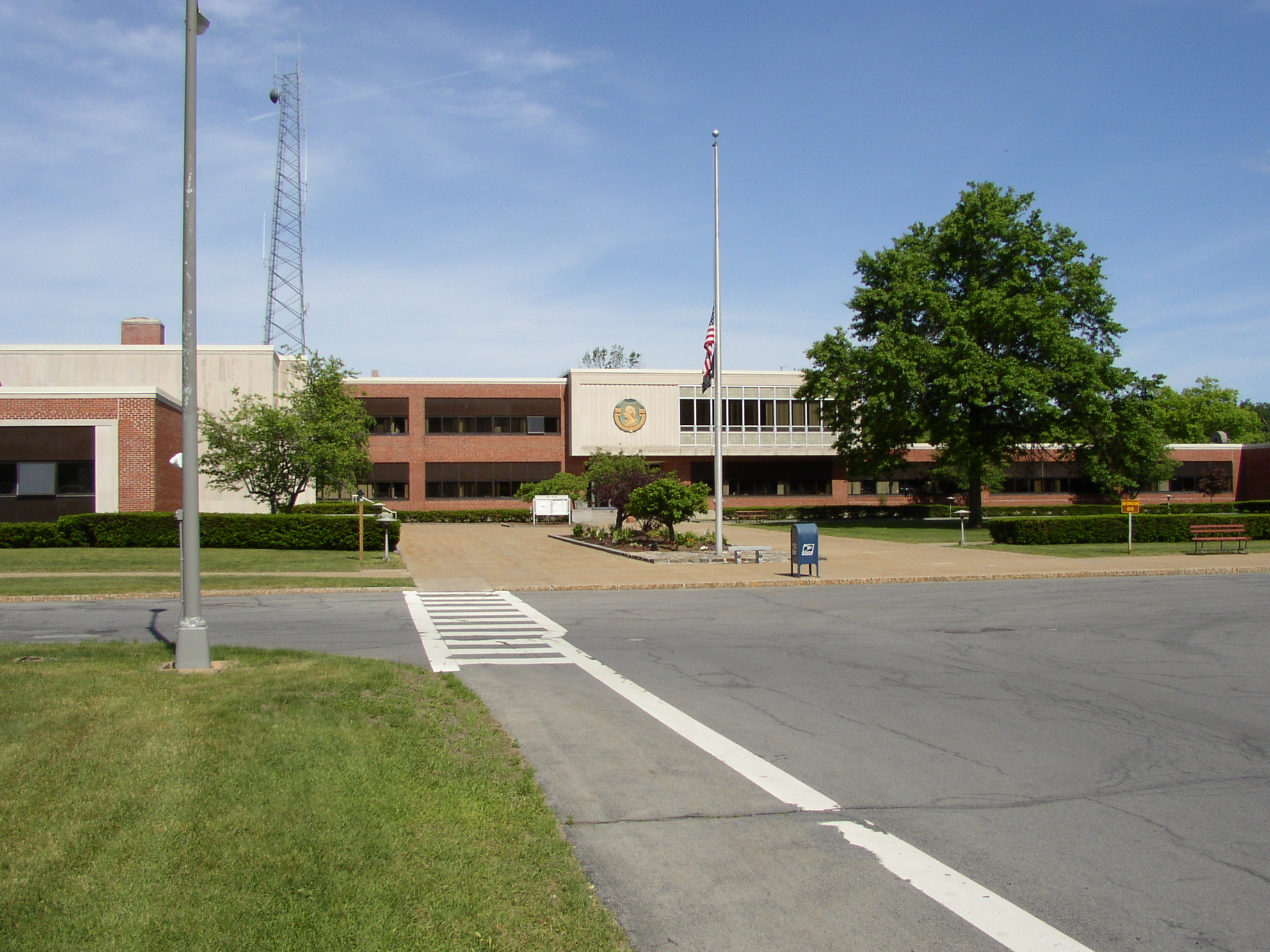
- Warren County Municipal Center

- Flag Seal

- Location within the U.S. state of New York
- Coordinates: 43°34′N 73°50′W
- Country: United States
- State: New York
- Established: 1813
- Named for: Joseph Warren
- Seat: Queensbury
- Largest city: Glens Falls

Area
  - Total: 932 sq mi (2,410 km^{2})
  - Land: 867 sq mi (2,250 km^{2})
  - Water: 65 sq mi (170 km^{2}) 6.9%

Population (2020)
  - Total: 65,737
  - Estimate (2025): 65,020 ▼
  - Density: 75.8/sq mi (29.3/km^{2})
- Time zone: UTC−5 (Eastern)
  - Summer (DST): UTC−4 (EDT)
- Congressional district: 21st
- Website: warrencountyny.gov

Warren County is a county in the U.S. state of New York. As of the 2020 census, the population was 65,737. The county seat is Queensbury. The county was established in 1813 and is named in honor of General Joseph Warren, an American Revolutionary War hero of the Battle of Bunker Hill. The county is part of the Capital District region of the state.

== History ==
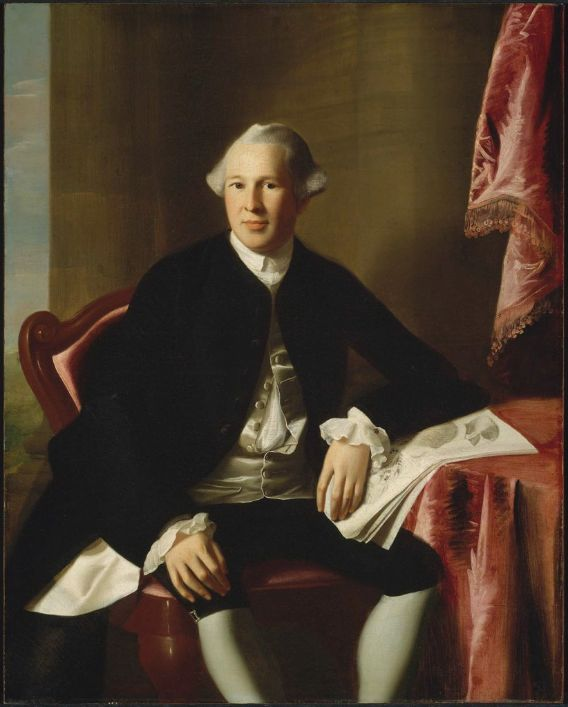
General Joseph Warren, namesake of Warren County. Portrait by John Singleton Copley, c. 1765

When counties were established in the Province of New York in 1683, the present Warren County was part of Albany County. The county was enormous, covering the northern part of New York State, all of the present State of Vermont, and, in theory, extended westward to the Pacific Ocean. It was reduced in size on July 3, 1766, by the creation of Cumberland County, and further on March 16, 1770, by the creation of Gloucester County, both containing territory now in Vermont. On March 12, 1772, what was left of Albany County was split into three parts, one remaining under the name Albany County. One of the other pieces, Charlotte County (named for the British queen Charlotte of Mecklenburg-Strelitz), contained the eastern portion.

In 1778, the name Charlotte County was changed to Washington County to honor George Washington, the American Revolutionary War general and later President of the United States of America.

In 1788, Washington County was reduced in size by the splitting-off of Clinton County. This was a much larger area than the present Clinton County, including several other counties or county parts of the present New York State. Washington County was slightly enlarged by the transfer of the Town of Cambridge from Albany County to Washington County in 1791.

In 1813, Warren County was split off from Washington County, receiving its name in honor of General Joseph Warren. County officials first met in the Lake George Coffee House in the hamlet of Caldwell (known today as Lake George Village). James Caldwell, a patenee of the Town of Caldwell, donated land within the hamlet to serve as the county seat beginning in 1819.

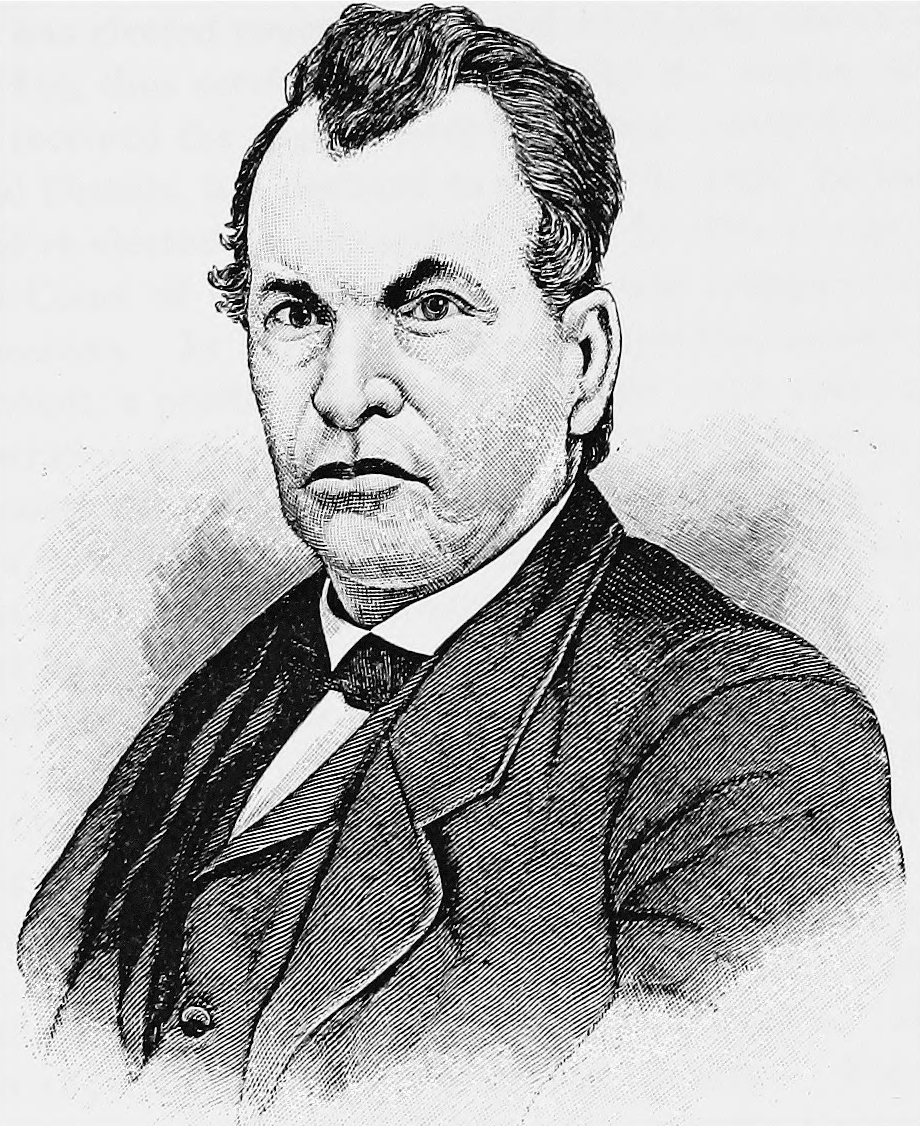
Halsey R. Wing became the first judge of Warren County in 1845.

Lake George is the site of a YMCA conference center, the Silver Bay YMCA, founded in 1900 and one of only a few of its type in the United States. The Silver Bay Inn was built in 1904 and is on the National Register of Historic Places.

In 1963, the courthouse in Lake George village was closed and operations moved several miles south to its present-day location at the Warren County Municipal Center main campus in Queensbury.

== Geography ==
According to the U.S. Census Bureau, the county has a total area of 932 square miles (2,410 km^{2}), of which 867 square miles (2,250 km^{2}) is land and 65 square miles (170 km^{2}) (6.9%) is water.

Warren County is situated in the eastern portion of New York State in the Adirondack Mountains. The eastern border is Washington County. The highest peak in the county is Gore Mountain at an elevation of 3,198 feet (975 m). It is typically included as the northern part of the Capital District although it is sometimes included as part of the North Country.

=== Adjacent counties ===
- Essex County - north
- Washington County - east
- Saratoga County - south
- Hamilton County - west

=== Climate ===
The climate of Warren County is humid continental, as is most of New York State. In the winter, bouts of cold, dry air arrive from Canada, and interior sections of North America. In the summer, the Gulf Stream can bring days of hot, moist, humid air to the county. Extratropical storms often affect the county; in the winter, Nor'easters bring heavy snow and rain, and sometimes high wind. Fall and spring are generally relatively mild and pleasant, with fall foliage regarded as some of the most stunning in the country. In the summer and fall, back door cold fronts move in from the north and bring thunderstorms, sometimes severe.

Monthly Normal High and Low Temperatures For Lake George, New York on the top and average monthly precipitation in inches on the lower section.
City	Jan	Feb	Mar	Apr	May	Jun	Jul	Aug	Sep	Oct	Nov	Dec
Lake George	31/10	35/12	45/22	59/33	71/45	79/53	83/58	81/56	73/48	61/37	47/29	35/17
City	Jan	Feb	Mar	Apr	May	Jun	Jul	Aug	Sep	Oct	Nov	Dec
Lake George	3.50"	2.58"	3.70"	3.73"	4.42"	4.17"	4.20"	4.28"	4.07"	3.61"	4.05"	3.46"
Source:Weather Channel

== Government and politics ==
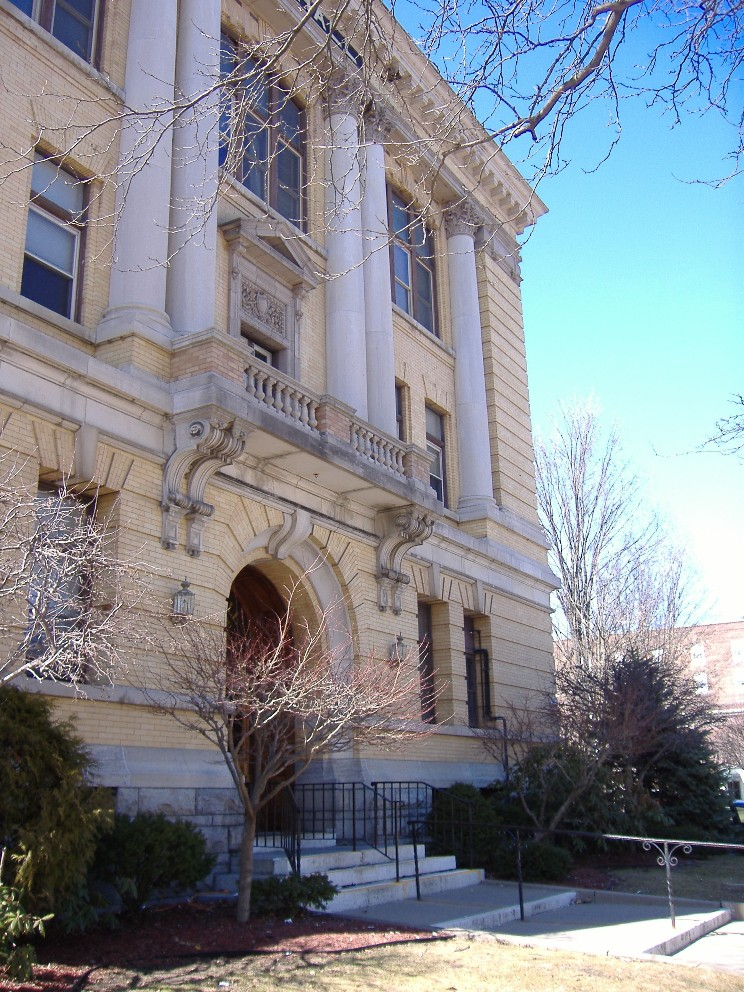
Glens Falls city hall

United States presidential election results for Warren County, New York
Year	Republican / Whig		Democratic		Third party(ies)	
Year	No.	%	No.	%	No.	%
1836	570	30.22%	1,316	69.78%	0	0.00%
1840	1,306	47.98%	1,411	51.84%	5	0.18%
1844	1,330	41.06%	1,791	55.29%	118	3.64%
1848	1,270	42.95%	1,019	34.46%	668	22.59%
1852	1,174	39.06%	1,713	56.99%	119	3.96%
1856	2,202	55.85%	1,006	25.51%	735	18.64%
1860	2,719	57.99%	1,970	42.01%	0	0.00%
1864	2,399	52.52%	2,169	47.48%	0	0.00%
1868	2,711	54.77%	2,239	45.23%	0	0.00%
1872	2,901	61.55%	1,803	38.26%	9	0.19%
1876	3,135	53.54%	2,663	45.48%	57	0.97%
1880	3,330	52.57%	2,618	41.33%	386	6.09%
1884	3,577	53.61%	2,793	41.86%	302	4.53%
1888	4,135	56.39%	2,883	39.32%	315	4.30%
1892	3,647	53.62%	2,655	39.03%	500	7.35%
1896	4,685	65.51%	2,269	31.73%	198	2.77%
1900	4,829	63.46%	2,540	33.38%	241	3.17%
1904	4,943	61.47%	2,756	34.27%	342	4.25%
1908	4,800	58.61%	3,019	36.86%	371	4.53%
1912	3,155	39.60%	2,802	35.17%	2,011	25.24%
1916	4,880	61.47%	2,825	35.58%	234	2.95%
1920	9,009	71.76%	3,227	25.70%	319	2.54%
1924	9,627	67.95%	3,663	25.85%	878	6.20%
1928	11,697	63.16%	6,793	36.68%	29	0.16%
1932	11,585	62.99%	6,661	36.22%	146	0.79%
1936	12,873	64.78%	6,807	34.26%	191	0.96%
1940	13,657	65.27%	7,226	34.54%	40	0.19%
1944	12,144	64.26%	6,716	35.54%	37	0.20%
1948	12,884	68.89%	5,486	29.33%	333	1.78%
1952	17,046	77.06%	5,051	22.84%	22	0.10%
1956	17,852	82.08%	3,897	17.92%	0	0.00%
1960	14,433	66.27%	7,328	33.65%	17	0.08%
1964	7,834	37.99%	12,772	61.94%	14	0.07%
1968	12,963	63.92%	6,460	31.85%	857	4.23%
1972	16,649	74.11%	5,760	25.64%	56	0.25%
1976	14,548	66.39%	7,264	33.15%	100	0.46%
1980	13,264	59.28%	6,971	31.15%	2,142	9.57%
1984	17,616	74.75%	5,886	24.97%	66	0.28%
1988	15,860	64.41%	8,580	34.85%	182	0.74%
1992	12,260	42.62%	9,820	34.14%	6,687	23.25%
1996	11,152	41.63%	11,603	43.31%	4,036	15.06%
2000	14,993	52.38%	12,193	42.60%	1,435	5.01%
2004	16,969	54.63%	13,405	43.16%	685	2.21%
2008	15,429	47.85%	16,281	50.49%	535	1.66%
2012	14,119	47.73%	14,806	50.06%	653	2.21%
2016	15,751	50.15%	13,091	41.68%	2,566	8.17%
2020	17,699	48.96%	17,642	48.80%	808	2.24%
2024	18,606	51.58%	17,099	47.40%	370	1.03%

Warren County historically has been supportive of Republican candidates since the Civil War. Both of Warren County's representatives in the state legislature, Daniel G. Stec in the Senate and Matthew Simpson in the Assembly are Republicans. Currently Republicans constitute 41% of registered voters in Warren County, while Democrats account for 27%. This shift has largely been driven by population growth within the county and reflects the county's shift from a consistently republican county to a lean republican/battleground county in upstate New York.

Democrats have been steadily making inroads in recent years; Senator Charles Schumer won the county by 56% in his re-election bid in 2004, and the Democrats recently gained a majority on the Glens Falls City Council. John Hall, a Democrat, picked up the county judgeship position in 2003. In 2006 Republican John E. Sweeney was unseated in the district by Kirsten Gillibrand as Member of Congress. In 2009 Congresswoman Kirsten Gillibrand was selected by Governor David Paterson to replace Hillary Clinton as New York's junior Senator. Democrat Scott Murphy was elected to replace Gillibrand in a special election for the NY 20th congressional district.

In the 2008 presidential election, Barack Obama narrowly carried Warren County over John McCain, with Obama receiving 16,281 votes countywide to McCain's total of 15,424 votes. This was only the second time since 1964 that Warren County had voted for the Democratic nominee, the other being 1996, when Bill Clinton won with a plurality. In 2012, Obama won again by a similar margin over Republican nominee Mitt Romney. In 2016, Donald Trump flipped the county back to the Republicans, with an 8.5 percent margin of victory over Democratic nominee Hillary Clinton. In 2020, Warren County voted for Trump again by a very narrow margin of just 57 votes, despite moving 8 points towards the Democratic ticket of former Vice President Joe Biden and junior California senator Kamala Harris. Warren is one of six New York counties that Trump won by less than 500 votes.

Warren County has 20 county supervisors, which represent 11 of the county's towns and the City of Glens Falls:

- Bolton: Ronald F. Conover
- Chester: John Maday
- Glens Falls
  - Ward 1: Jack Diamond
  - Ward 2: Haley Gilligan
  - Ward 3: Nancy Turner
  - Ward 4: Daniel Bruno
  - Ward 5: Bennett F. Driscoll Jr.
- Hague: Joshua Patchett
- Horicon: Wayne Butler
- Johnsburg: Sterling T. Goodspeed
- Lake George: Vincent Crocitto
- Lake Luzerne: James Niles
- Queensbury
  - County:
    - Michael Wild
    - Douglas Beaty
    - Nathan Etu
    - David Strainer
  - Town: John Strough
- Stony Creek: John O'Neill
- Thurman: Debra Runyon
- Warrensburg: Kevin Geraghty

The board of supervisors control weighted votes for county matters, based on the population of the towns they represent, with the Queensbury Town Supervisor and county supervisors having the largest number of votes on the board.

The current Warren County sheriff is James LaFarr. The sheriff's office is structured around three divisions; Administrative Services, Law Enforcement and Correction. The Law Enforcement Division includes both Investigative Services, Patrol Services and the Communications Center. Patrol Services have specialized units that operate under the control of the Division Commander. The sheriff's office provides boat patrols on Lake George and Schroon Lake.

== Demographics ==
Historical population
Census	Pop.	Note	%±
1820	9,453		—
1830	11,796		24.8%
1840	13,422		13.8%
1850	17,199		28.1%
1860	21,434		24.6%
1870	22,592		5.4%
1880	25,179		11.5%
1890	27,866		10.7%
1900	29,943		7.5%
1910	32,223		7.6%
1920	31,673		−1.7%
1930	34,174		7.9%
1940	36,035		5.4%
1950	39,205		8.8%
1960	44,002		12.2%
1970	49,402		12.3%
1980	54,854		11.0%
1990	59,209		7.9%
2000	63,303		6.9%
2010	65,707		3.8%
2020	65,737		0.0%
2025 (est.)	65,020	▼	−1.1%
U.S. Decennial Census; 1790–1960 1900–1990; 1990–2000 2010–2020

|estyear=2023 |estimate=65380 |estref=

=== 2020 census ===
Warren County, New York – Racial and ethnic composition Note: the US Census treats Hispanic/Latino as an ethnic category. This table excludes Latinos from the racial categories and assigns them to a separate category. Hispanics/Latinos may be of any race.
Race / Ethnicity (NH = Non-Hispanic)	Pop 1980	Pop 1990	Pop 2000	Pop 2010	Pop 2020	% 1980	% 1990	% 2000	% 2010	% 2020
White alone (NH)	54,018	58,059	61,276	62,585	59,299	98.48%	98.06%	96.80%	95.25%	90.21%
Black or African American alone (NH)	237	299	371	556	736	0.43%	0.50%	0.59%	0.85%	1.12%
Native American or Alaska Native alone (NH)	66	99	116	117	139	0.12%	0.17%	0.18%	0.18%	0.21%
Asian alone (NH)	130	267	338	449	729	0.24%	0.45%	0.53%	0.68%	1.11%
Native Hawaiian or Pacific Islander alone (NH)	x	x	7	5	0	x	x	0.01%	0.01%	0.00%
Other race alone (NH)	38	9	32	37	189	0.07%	0.02%	0.05%	0.06%	0.29%
Mixed race or Multiracial (NH)	x	x	500	780	2,893	x	x	0.79%	1.19%	4.40%
Hispanic or Latino (any race)	365	476	663	1,178	1,752	0.67%	0.80%	1.05%	1.79%	2.67%
Total	54,854	59,209	63,303	65,707	65,737	100.00%	100.00%	100.00%	100.00%	100.00%

=== 2000 census ===
As of the census of 2000, there were 63,303 people, 25,726 households, and 17,056 families residing in the county. The population density was 73 inhabitants per square mile (28/km^{2}). There were 34,852 housing units at an average density of 40 units per square mile (15/km^{2}). The racial makeup of the county was 97.48% White, 0.62% Black or African American, 0.21% Native American, 0.55% Asian, 0.01% Pacific Islander, 0.23% from other races, and 0.91% from two or more races. Hispanic or Latino of any race were 1.05% of the population. 17.9% were of Irish, 12.7% English, 11.4% Italian, 11.1% French, 10.6% German and 9.0% American ancestry according to Census 2000. 96.3% spoke English, 1.4% Spanish and 1.0% French as their first language.

There were 25,726 households, out of which 30.70% had children under the age of 18 living with them, 51.90% were married couples living together, 10.40% had a female householder with no husband present, and 33.70% were non-families. 27.30% of all households were made up of individuals, and 11.30% had someone living alone who was 65 years of age or older. The average household size was 2.41 and the average family size was 2.93.

In the county, the population was spread out, with 24.00% under the age of 18, 7.50% from 18 to 24, 28.20% from 25 to 44, 25.10% from 45 to 64, and 15.20% who were 65 years of age or older. The median age was 39 years. For every 100 females there were 94.20 males. For every 100 females age 18 and over, there were 91.00 males.

The median income for a household in the county was $39,198, and the median income for a family was $46,793. Males had a median income of $32,922 versus $22,279 for females. The per capita income for the county was $20,727. About 7.20% of families and 9.70% of the population were below the poverty line, including 14.10% of those under age 18 and 5.90% of those age 65 or over.

== Economy ==
Throughout the county, annual retail sales totals up to $1,010,937,000. General merchandise sales is $101,762,000. Apparel store's annual sales are $98,221,000 while annual food sales is $162,890,000. Health and drug store sales total up to $44,841,000.

The county contains the highest concentrated area of medical manufacturers in New York state, with many medical inventions originating in the county. Norman Jekyll and David Sheridan introduced the medical device industry to the Glens Falls area. In the 1940s, they produced products that were from materials supplied by war-torn Europe. One of the primary manufacturers is AngioDynamics Inc., which is located in Queensbury, and is a producer of medical devices used in minimally invasive, image-guided procedures to treat peripheral vascular disease. Another major manufacturer of medical devices is Boston Scientific Corp., which is located in Glens Falls.

== Education ==
In Warren County, there are 16 public elementary schools, with the largest being the Queensbury Elementary School, serving 1,150 students and the smallest being the Abraham Wing School, serving 146 students. There are nine middle schools, with the largest being Queensbury Middle School, serving 945 students and the smallest being the Bolton Central School, serving 285 students. There are also 11 high schools, with the largest being the Queensbury Senior High School, serving 1,301 students, and the smallest being the Bolton Central School, serving 285 students. In addition, there is one major private secondary school: the St. Mary's - St. Alphonsus Regional Catholic School, which is located in Glens Falls.

SUNY Adirondack is the site of post-secondary education in Warren County. Located in Queensbury, the college provides an extensive program of degrees and certificate programs. SUNY Plattsburgh, based in Clinton County, offers bachelor and master-degree programs at the SUNY Adirondack campus.

== Healthcare ==
The primary healthcare center in Warren County is the Glens Falls Hospital, which is located in Glens Falls. Providing 410 beds, its most common procedure is miscellaneous diagnostic and therapeutic procedures.

== Transportation ==
=== Bus ===
Regular bus service from Queensbury to Glens Falls is provided by CDTA. These also include trolleys that run on the road. The trolleys go from Bolton Landing (four times a day) and usually turn around just north of Hearthstone Point Campground on Route 9N.

=== Roads ===
There are several state and county maintained roads in Warren County, making up a total of 464.7 miles (747.9 km) of roadway. The only U.S. Route is U.S. Route 9, which traverses the eastern portion of the county. The only interstate is Interstate 87, also known as the Adirondack Northway.

==== South of Lake George Village ====
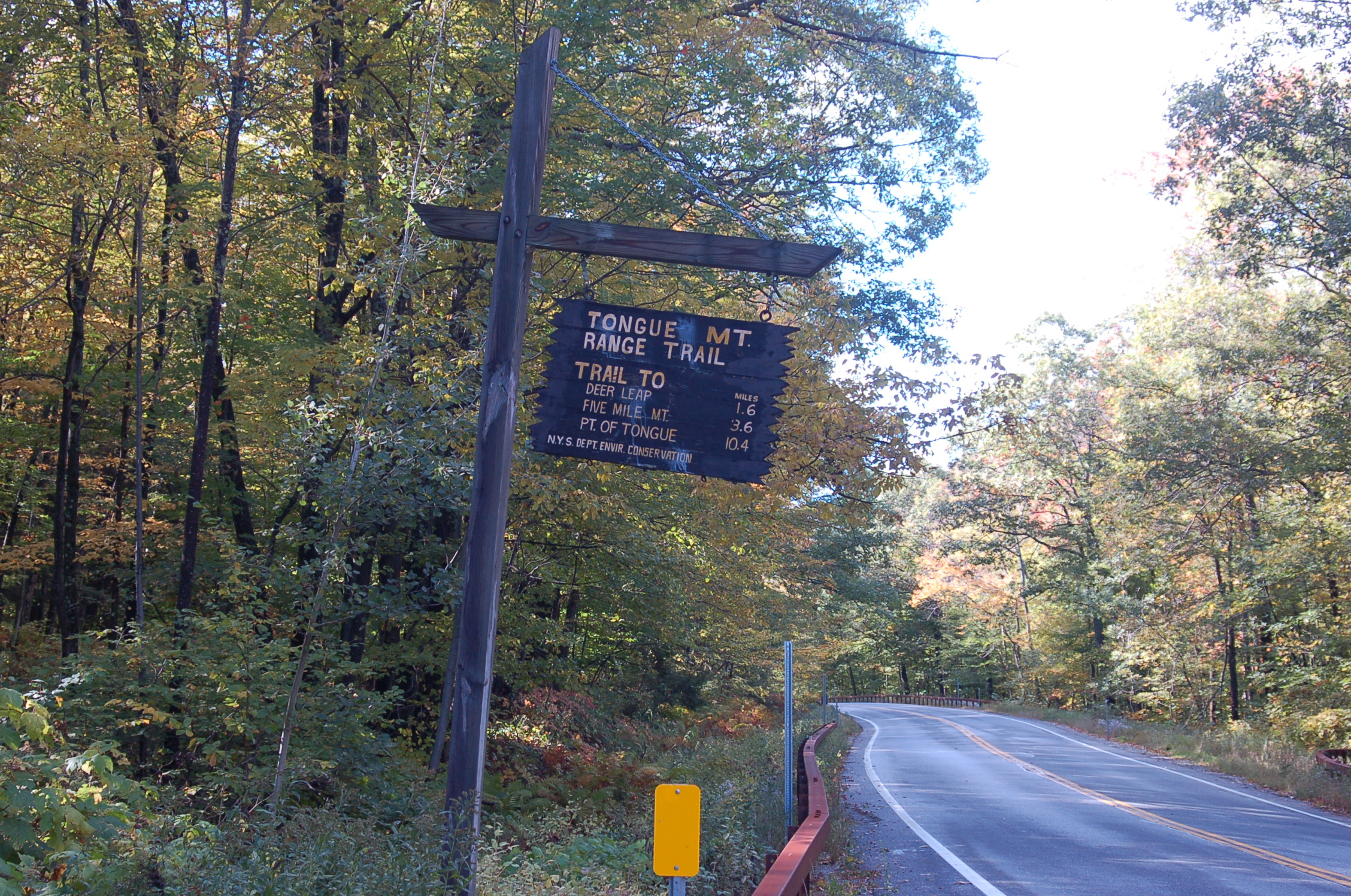
View of Route 9N from the North End Trailhead

Only New York State Route 9N traverses the Lake Luzerne region of Warren County. There are two state-maintained routes in Glens Falls: Route 9L, which terminates in the city, while the second is New York State Route 32, which leaves Warren for Washington County, where it terminates at New York State Route 196. Also, on the eastern side of the city, there is County Route 79 (Boulevard), a former alignment of NY 32. There is New York State Route 149, a 32 miles (51 km) long road that traverses Warren and nearby Washington counties. There is also New York State Route 254, a 6 miles (9.7 km) road in southern part of the town and enters Washington County as well. The third and final state maintained route is New York State Route 9L, which traverses down the central portion of the town. Several county routes traverse through Stony Creek. These include County Route 3, County Route 12, County Route 22, and County Route 76.

==== Lake George Village ====
There are several major routes in the town and village of Lake George. There is New York State Route 9N, which traverses north to south through the county. There is also County Routes 6 (Fort George Boulevard) and 59 (Bloody Pond Road). The latter is a continuation of New York State Route 9L and heads to terminate in Queensbury. In this town includes New York State Route 912Q, which is the Exit 22 connector/park & ride on the Northway.

==== North of Lake George Village ====
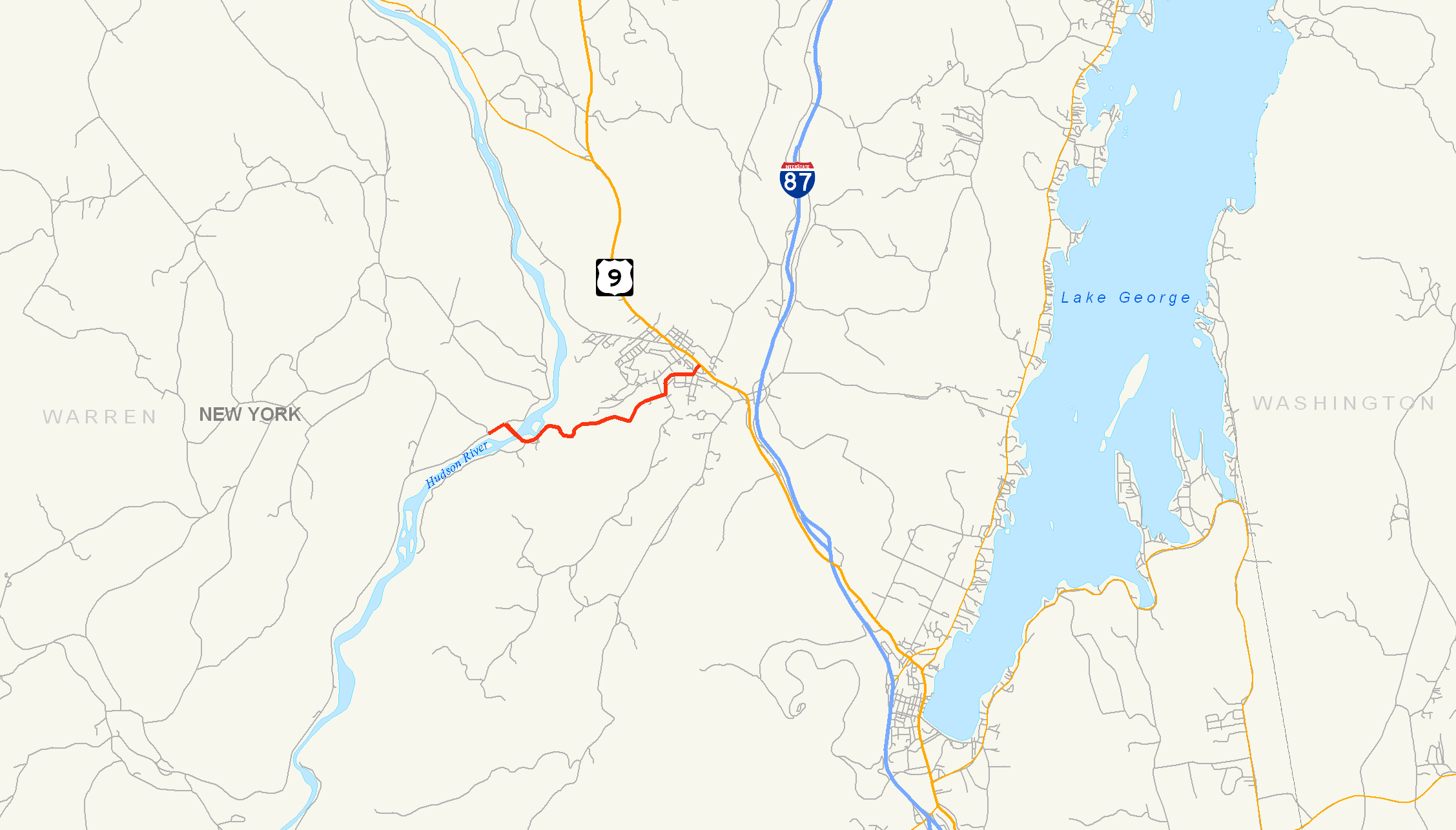
Map of New York State Route 418

Although the region for Bolton and Bolton Landing is large, there is only one state-maintained route, Route 9N, and there is County Route 11 (Bolton-Riverbank Road), which is a connector to Exit 24 on the Northway. Only two county or higher-level maintained roads traverse the hamlet of Diamond Point, Route 9N and County Route 35 (Diamond Point Road), which connects 9N to the Northway (Exit 23) and U.S. Route 9 in Warrensburg. New York State Route 8 enters the county at Johnsburg, entering into the Town of Chester, where it merges with U.S. Route 9 for almost four miles, splitting off at the Landon Hill/Route 8/Route 9 intersection. New York State Route 8 terminates at an intersection with New York State Route 9N in the center of Hague. There are several state-maintained and county-maintained roads in the Warrensburg area. These include the termini of both New York State Route 28 and New York State Route 418 at US 9. There are also a few county routes, including County Route 4 in Athol and County Route 10 (Horicon Road) in Warrensburg. Route 10 continues eastward, terminating in Bolton Landing.

=== Trains ===
The Fort Edward Amtrak station is located 6 miles (10 km) southeast of Glens Falls. Amtrak serves the station via its Adirondack and Ethan Allen Express daily routes, which allow easy access to Montréal, Albany, New York City, and Rutland, Vermont, among many other towns and cities.

The Whitehall Amtrak station is located 23 miles (37 km) northeast of Glens Falls and is serviced by the Adirondack route.

=== Airport ===
Floyd Bennett Memorial Airport (FAA: GFL) is a county-owned, public-use airport located 3 nautical miles (6 km) northeast of Glens Falls, in the Town of Queensbury.

== Arts and culture ==
Warren County is home to several music centers, including the Luzerne Music Center, which is a summer camp focused on teaching music, in the foothills of the Adirondacks. In July, it holds an annual Chamber Music Festival which is open for public viewing. The Upper Hudson Musical Arts is also a popular attraction, bringing concerts by professional chamber music ensembles and soloists to the Adirondacks throughout the year. Concerts are held at the Tannery Pond Community Center in North Creek. In addition, the Charles R. Wood Theater home to Adirondack Theatre Festival is a year-round professional theater in Glens Falls.

In Warren County, New York on Lake George at Bolton Landing, Golden Heart Farm art colony the summer residence of Thomas and Wilhelmina Weber Furlong of the Art Students League of New York opened in the summer of 1921. The historically important art colony and artists in residence program were at the center of the American modernist movement as important artists like David Smith, John Graham, and Dorothy Dehner from Manhattan traveled to Warren County to escape the city and study with the couple. A New York State historic marker was placed for the Warren County Bicentennial honoring Weber Furlong On July 23, 2013, at City Hall in Glens Falls.

== Points of interest ==
=== Lake George ===
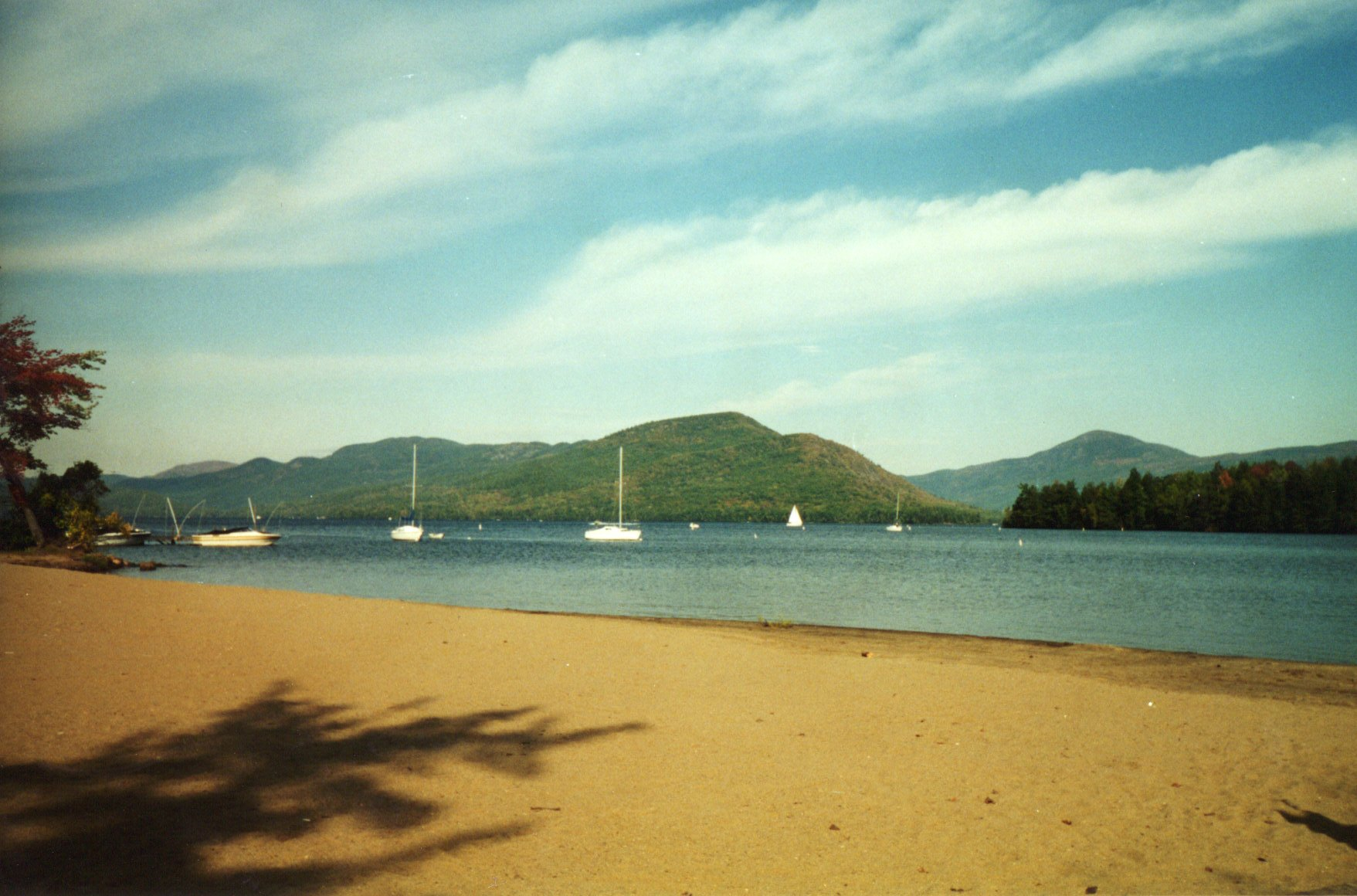
Lake George

Warren County is the primary area of tourism related to Lake George. Lake George is a 28,160-acre (114.0 km^{2}) lake located in the Adirondack Mountains. Popular activities on the lake include river tubing, swimming, kayaking and boating. There are several large points of interest in the Lake George region. These include Prospect Mountain just outside town, Steel Pier along Beach Road which serves several tour boats. The village is a popular tourist spot and is home to many stores and novelty shops. There is the Lake George Battleground on the edge of the village along County Route 6.

To the north, there are several hotels and motels to serve tourists visiting the lake. There are several campgrounds around the region including Hearthstone Point on Route 9N and Lake George Battleground south of the village. There are also several campgrounds on islands on the lake. These include Long Island, which serves 88 campsites. All island campgrounds and land-locked grounds are maintained by the New York Department of Environmental Conservation.

=== Historic sites ===
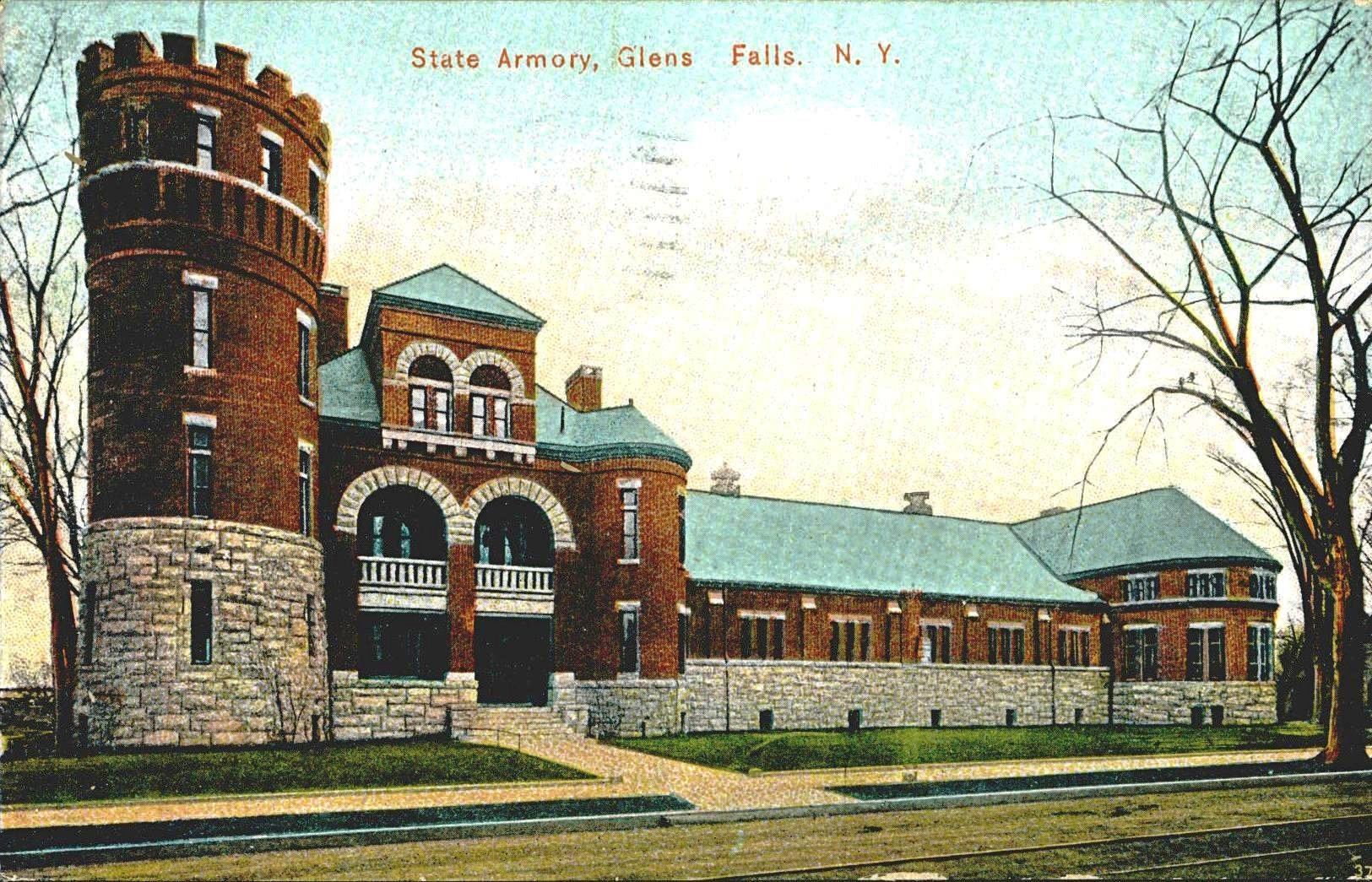
State Armory in Glens Falls in 1907

One of the premiere historic sites in Warren County is the Fredella, Joseph J., House and Garage, which was constructed in 1900, and is significant for its architectural detail. It is on the list of National Register of Historic Places. Another popular historic site is the Wreck of the 1758 radeau LAND TORTOISE, a shipwreck site which occurred in 1758 of European-American origin. Other historic sites include:

- Chapman Historical Museum
- Edward Eggleston Estate
- First Presbyterian Church of Glens Falls
- Fredella Street Historic District (Glens Falls)
- Gates Homestead (Bolton)
- Marcella Sembrich Opera Museum
- The Hyde Collection (Glens Falls)
- Three Squares Historic District (Glens Falls)
- Warrensburg Mills Historic District
- Wiawaka Bateaux Site
- Wiawaka Holiday House
- List of Historic Markers in Warren County

== Communities ==
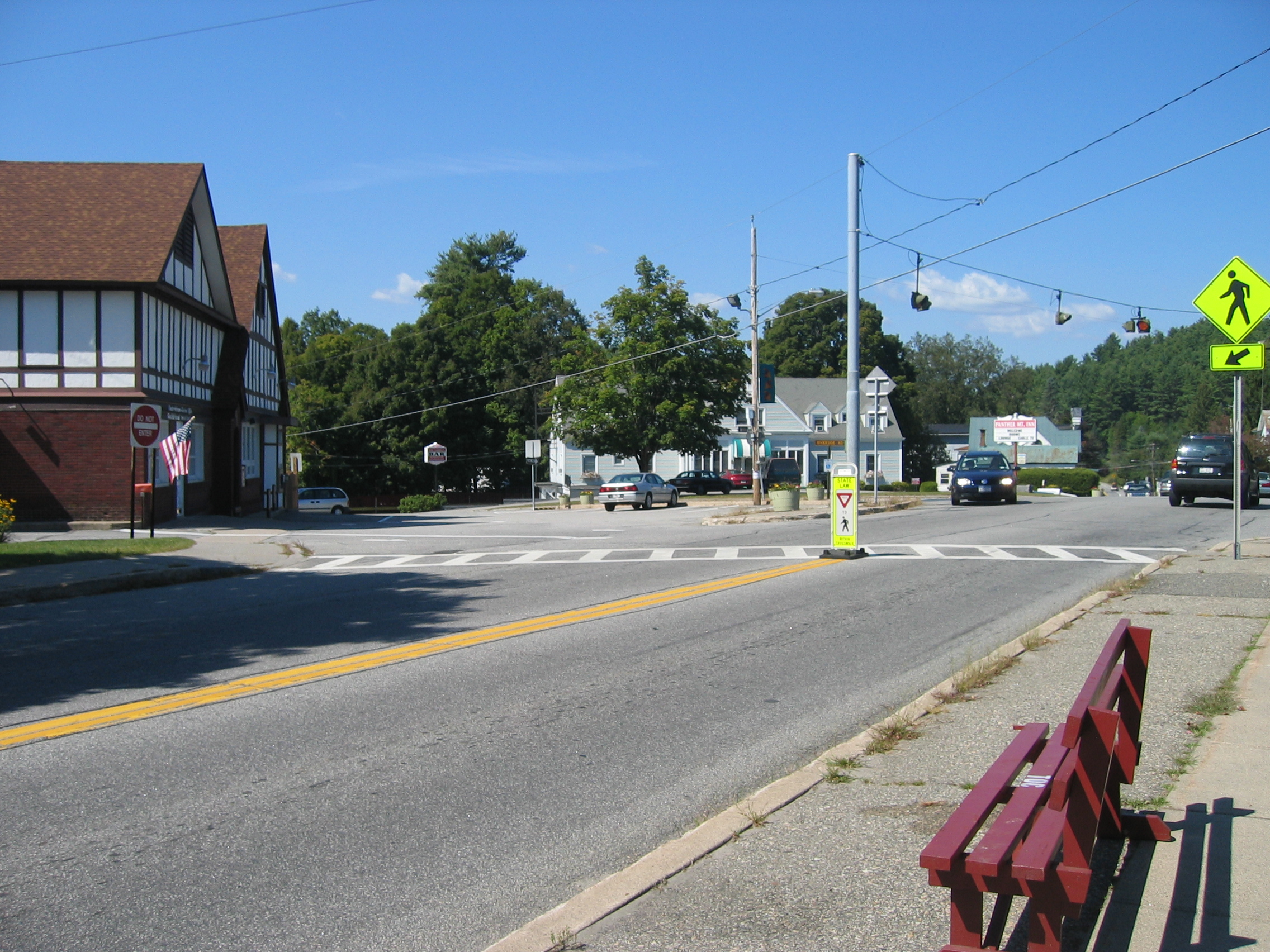
Hamlet of Chestertown in Chester, typical for the area.

=== Larger Settlements ===
#	Location	Population	Type	Area
1	†Glens Falls	14,830	City	Greater Glens Falls
2	Glens Falls North	9,530	CDP	Greater Glens Falls
3	West Glens Falls	9,473	CDP	Greater Glens Falls
4	Warrensburg	3,045	CDP	Adirondack Park
5	Lake Luzerne	1,336	CDP	South
6	Lake George	1008	Village	Adirondack Park
7	Chestertown	586	CDP	Adirondack Park
8	Pottersville	359	CDP	Adirondack Park
-	Bolton Landing	518	CDP	Adirondack Park
-	North Creek	562	CDP	Adirondack Park

=== Towns ===
- Bolton
- Chester
- Hague
- Horicon
- Johnsburg
- Lake George
- Lake Luzerne
- Queensbury (county seat)
- Stony Creek
- Thurman
- Warrensburg

=== Hamlets ===
- Brant Lake
- East Lake George
- Kattskill Bay
- North River
- Oneida Corners
- Riparius
- Silver Bay
- Wevertown
- Pottersville
- Cleverdale

== See also ==
- List of counties in New York
- National Register of Historic Places listings in Warren County, New York
