= Allen Tucker =

American painter

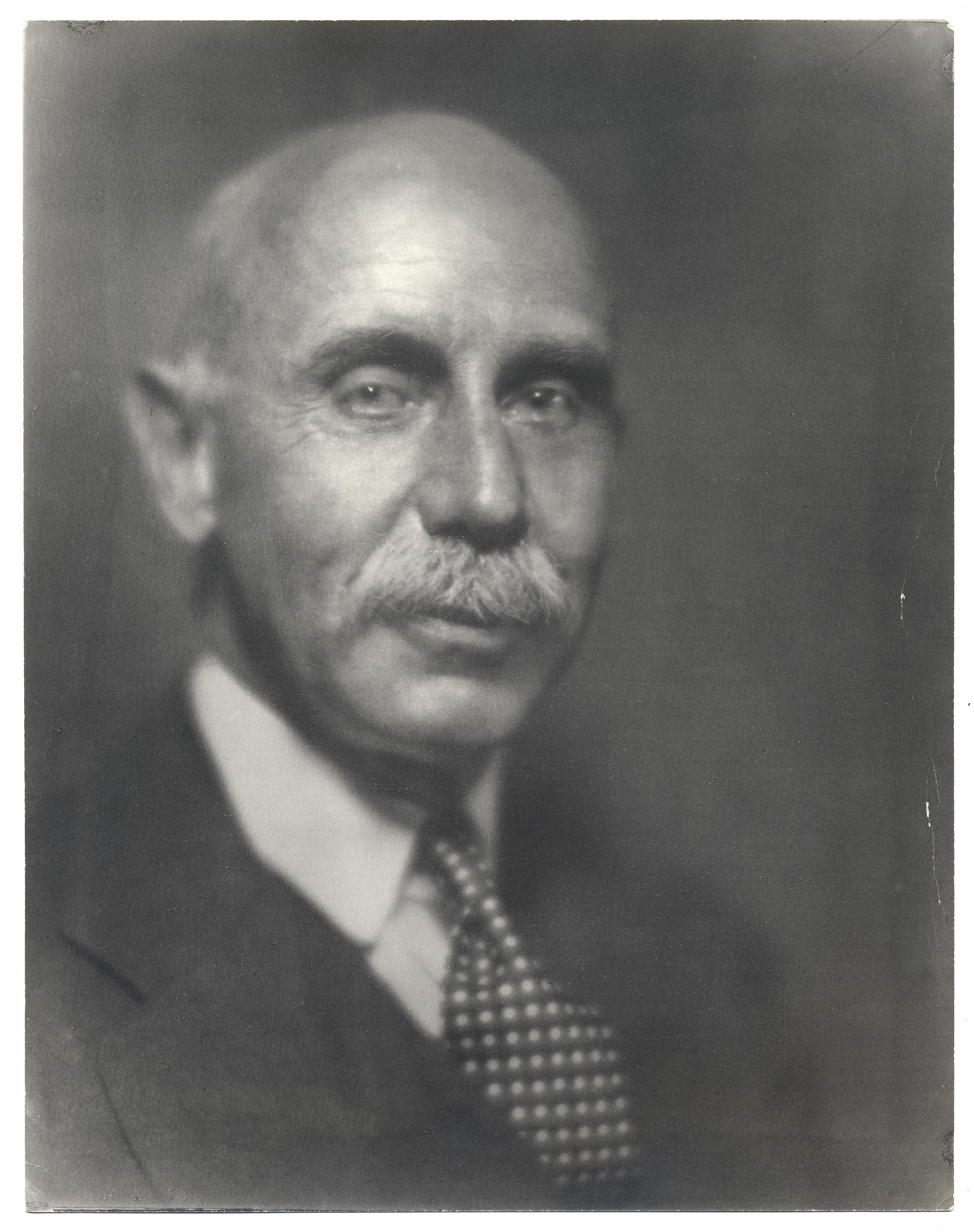
- Born: 1866; Brooklyn, New York
- Died: 1939 (aged 72–73)
- Known for: landscapes

Allen Tucker (1866–1939) was an American artist.

== Biography ==
He was born in Brooklyn, New York in 1866 and graduated from the School of Mines of Columbia University in 1887 with a degree in architecture and worked as a draftsman at McIlvaine and Tucker.

In 1908, he exhibited with Robert Henri, George Luks, George Bellows and others, contemporary with The Eight. Tucker was active in organizing the 1910 first exhibit of the Independents, and was responsible for the catalog of the Armory Show of 1913. One of his landscapes appeared on the postcard announcement.

In World War I, Tucker served in the American Ambulance Service in France. From 1921 through 1926, he served as an instructor at the Art Students League of New York where he became a close friend of Wilhelmina Weber Furlong and her husband Thomas Furlong the couple held administrative and executive positions at the league during his tenure as an instructor.

His work appears in many major American museums and collections, including the Frye Art Museum, the Delaware Art Museum, the Brooklyn Museum, the University of Michigan Museum of Art, the Whitney Museum of American Art, the Philadelphia Museum of Art, and the Metropolitan Museum of Art.
