= Alice Van Vechten Brown =

American art historian

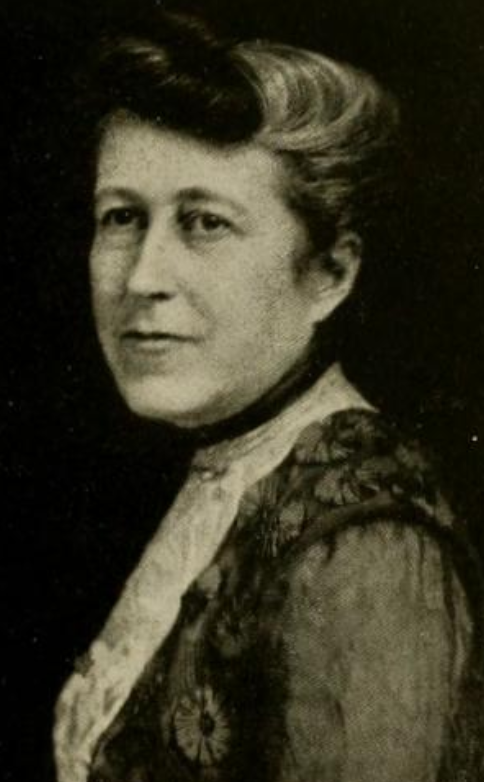
- Alice Van Vechten Brown, from a 1915 publication
- Born: June 7, 1862; Hanover, New Hampshire, US
- Died: October 16, 1949 (aged 87); Middletown, New Jersey, US
- Occupations: College professor, art historian

Alice Van Vechten Brown (June 7, 1862 – October 16, 1949) was an art educator and historian, notable for the creation of the first courses in museum training (1911) and modern art (1927) in the United States. The modern art course was taught by Alfred H. Barr, Jr., who would later claim the departmental headings he developed for the Museum of Modern Art were merely "the subject headings of the Wellesley course".

The daughter of a minister on faculty at Dartmouth College, she initially pursued a career as an artist, studying with the Art Students League of New York with Abbot H. Thayer, until an illness in the family forced her return home. She exhibited at the Salon des Artistes Indépendants in Paris. After her return, she took a job at Wellesley College running the Farnsworth Museum and heading up the art department. Charged with redesigning Wellesley's art history program, she moved the program from a study of photos and textbooks to a more active format involving laboratory methods. In the Wellesley program students learned artistic techniques to better understand the history of art.

With William Rankin, she was the author of A Short History of Italian Painting (1914).

She died October 16, 1949, aged 87, in Middletown, New Jersey.
