= Marcella Sembrich Opera Museum =

- U.S. National Register of Historic Places
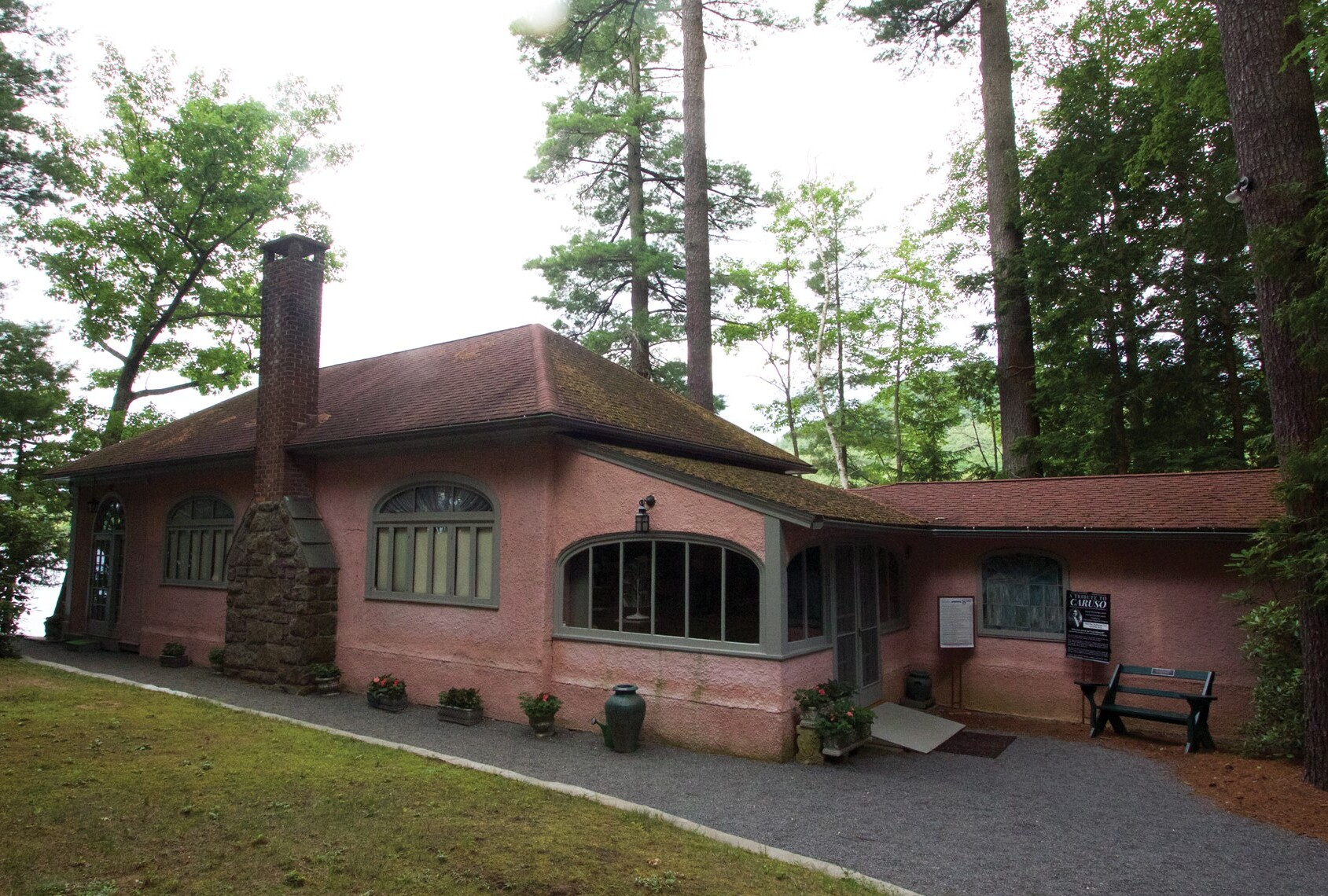

- Location within New York Location within the United States
- Location: 4800 Lake Shore Dr., Bolton Landing, New York
- Coordinates: 43°32′52″N 73°39′40″W
- Area: 4.8 acres (1.9 ha)
- Built: 1922
- Architect: Mannix, Arthur
- Architectural style: Mission/Spanish Revival
- NRHP reference No.: 02000799
- Added to NRHP: July 19, 2002

Marcella Sembrich Opera Museum, also known as The Sembrich and the Marcella Sembrich Memorial Studio, is a historic teaching studio located at Bolton Landing, Warren County, New York. It was built in 1922-24 as a teaching studio for New York Metropolitan Opera diva Marcella Sembrich (1858-1935). The studio building is a one-story, rectangular, stucco walled wood-frame building with a hipped roof and glassed in porches in the Spanish Revival style. Additional contributing features on the property are a bathhouse, curator's cottage, a lookout, stone retaining walls along the shoreline, stone walls, three piers flanking the entrance, wrought iron fencing and entrance gate, and landscape features. The property was converted to a museum shortly after the death of Marcella Sembrich in 1935.

The Sembrich hosts summer concerts, lectures, films and performances.

It was added to the National Register of Historic Places in 2002.

== See also ==
- List of music museums
