= Thomas Furlong (artist) =

American painter

Tomás (Tomas) Furlong
- Born: February 28 1886; St. Louis, Missouri
- Died: 1952; Bolton Landing, New York
- Education: Art Students League
- Known for: Painting, muralist
- Movement: Modern art, realism, impressionism
- Patrons: Oliver Gould Jennings Hyde Collection, Bolton Museum, Weber Furlong Foundation, Studio 98

Tomás (Tomas) Furlong (1886–1952) was an American artist and teacher.

== Biography ==
Furlong was a member of the executive Board of Control of the Art Students League and, beginning in 1927, an art instructor at New York University. He was married to Wilhelmina Weber Furlong. In the American modern art movement, his significant circle of friends and acquaintances included John Graham, Willem de Kooning, David Smith, Dorothy Dehner, Jean Charolot, Alexander Calder, Rockwell and Sally Kent, Thomas Hart Benton, Allen Tucker, Max Weber, Kimon Nicolaides, and many others. Tomás Furlong lived and worked in New York, City and shared a gallery with his wife Wilhelmina Weber Furlong. He was a realist and an accomplished muralist.
