= Matt Finley =

American musician

Matt Finley (born August 17, 1951, in New York City) is an American flugelhorn player and composer of Brazilian jazz.

Finley grew up performing in resorts in Bolton Landing and Lake George (New York), graduated from Phillips Academy and Union College where he studied composition with Edgar Curtis, Director of the Albany Symphony Orchestra. After obtaining a master's degree from the College of Saint Rose, he performed for seven years with Grammy Award-winning baritone saxophonist Nick Brignola. A multi-instrumentalist, Matt performs on flugelhorn, trumpet, soprano sax and flute. He is a retired professor of computer information systems and was academic dean at Dutchess Community College in Poughkeepsie, New York, where he earned the Chancellor's Award for Excellence in Professional Service granted by the State University of New York.

He has been a member of the American Federation of Musicians since 1972, and is the leader of Rio JAZZ, a Brazilian jazz concert sextet formed in 1988. Matt has performed with Nick Brignola, Kenny Blake, Brad Upton, Dave Holland, Glen Moore, Joel Rosenblatt, Mark Egan, Pete Levin, Terry Silverlight and many others. He is married to singer/songwriter Denise Jordan Finley and lives in Pine Plains, NY and Bolton Landing, NY.

== Discography ==
As a leader and composer:

- 'Brazilian Wish' (Kingsmill Music, 2006) with Romero Lubambo, Warren Bernhardt, Mark Egan, Joel Rosenblatt, David Finck, Jon Werking, Jeff Ciampa, David Mann, Jeff Siegel, Tomas Martin Lopez, Dan Levine, Barry Danielian.

As a sideman and arranger:

- 'On the Beat Path' (Bongotoms Music, 2010) with Bill O'Connell, Tomas Martin Lopez, Ruben Rodriguez, Joel Rosenblatt, Jimmy Branly, Ivan Renta, Bill McBirnie. Matt composed eight of the twelve compositions.
- 'Solstice' (Dome Island Publishing, 2010) with Denise Jordan Finley, Daniel Pagdon, Danny Gottlieb, Clifford Carter
- 'Eyes on the Horizon' (Barbara Martin Music, 2010) with Barbara Martin, Robert Redd, Steven Wolf, Chuck Redd
- 'The Way Back Home' (Music Without Walls Productions, 2009) with Sharon Klein, Ross Rice, Ken Veltz, Glen Velez, Karl Alweiler, Brian Mellick, Mark Dann
- 'Hauntress' (Dome Island Publishing, 2007) with Denise Jordan Finley, Daniel Pagdon
