= John D. Graham =

American painter (1887–1961)

- Born: Ivan Gratianovitch Dombrowsky; 8 January 1887 [O.S. 27 December 1886] Kyiv, Ukraine
- Died: 27 June 1961 (aged 74) (Note: Sources on birth date conflict and Graham may have been born in 1886, 1887 or 1888); London, England
- Education: Art Students League
- Known for: Painting
- Movement: Modern art, Abstract art
- Spouses: Ebrenia Ignatevnia Makavelia, Vera Aleksandrovna, Elinor Gibson, Constance Wellman, Marianne Schapira Strate
- Children: 4
- Patrons: Katherine S. Dreier, Duncan Phillips (art collector)

John D. Graham (8 January 1887 [O.S. 27 December 1886], Kyiv, Ukraine – June 27, 1961, London, England) was a Ukrainian–born American modernist and figurative painter, art collector, and a mentor of modernist artists in New York City.

Born Ivan Gratianovitch Dombrowsky in Kyiv, he immigrated to New York in 1920. He studied painting for the first time in his 30s, becoming deeply interested in modernism. In addition to gaining attention for his own work, he championed the new movement as a collector and curator. He was a mentor to a younger generation of American artists, who developed the style of Abstract Expressionism in the New York area. In the 1940s and 1950s, Graham developed a new figurative style derived from classical masters, which he first showed in paintings and drawings of Russian soldiers. He died in London, England.

== Early life and career ==
Dombrovsky was born into an aristocratic family of Szlachta descent to parents Gratian-Ignatius Dombrovsky and Youzefa Dombrovsky (née Brezinska). He received a classical education and graduated from the St. Vladimir University (University of Kyiv) in 1913 with a degree in law. At some point during or shortly after his studies he married his first wife, Ebrenia (a.k.a. Catherine) Ignatevnia Makavelia, and had two children, Cyril and Maria. He went on to serve as a cavalry officer under Czar Nicholas II during World War I in the Circassian Regiment of the Russian Imperial Army. For his efforts in the war, he earned the Saint George's Cross.

After the execution of Czar Nicholas II and his family in 1918 by the Bolsheviks during the Russian Revolution, Dombrovsky was briefly imprisoned due to his noble class. He fled for a time to his mother's native Poland, which gained independence from the Russian Empire for a time after WWI. There he lived in Warsaw. He returned to fight in the Crimea with "the Whites", counter-revolutionaries, but decided to leave when the resistance collapsed.

== Immigration to the United States ==
In 1920, Dombrovsky immigrated to the United States with his second wife, Vera Aleksandrovna, and their son Nicholas. They settled in New York City. He began calling himself John (Ivan in English) in the United States, and had his name officially changed to John D. Graham upon becoming a United States citizen in 1927.

== Artistic career ==
Still under the name Dombrovsky (also spelled Dabrowsky), John began to study painting for the first time at the Art Students League of New York. There he also briefly assisted painter John F. Sloan, known as one of the Ashcan School. Dombrovsky soon attracted attention for his art.

In 1925 he relocated to Baltimore with his third wife, artist Elinor Gibson, whom he met at the Art Students League. They had a son, David Graham. The son later married Patricia Thompson, and died in Windermere, Florida. David Graham had gone to Europe to retrieve the remainder of his father's work upon the latter’s death. Patricia Thompson Graham later gave numerous works by his father to the Museum of Modern Art in New York. Other of Graham's relatively small collection of remaining works are in her sisters Kathryn and Jean's portfolios.

Mysteria 2 (1927), The Phillips Collection, Washington, D.C.

While in Baltimore, Graham joined a group called The Modernists. He served as their secretary and exhibited in their gallery. In this period, in addition to painting, Graham established himself as an art connoisseur and collector. He most notably established a collection of African art for Vanity Fair editor Frank Crowninshield. Graham himself also collected traditional African art, and eventually developed part of his studio at 57 Greenwich Avenue into what he called the Primitive Arts Gallery. He was greatly interested in developing knowledge of advances and changes in the art world, and kept in touch with what was taking place in Europe as well as the US.

Beginning in the 1930s, Graham became associated with the New York School as an artist and impresario. In that decade, he was painting in the abstract, post-cubist style of Pablo Picasso, who exerted wide leadership from Paris. Graham was a close friend with artists Wilhelmina Weber Furlong and her husband Thomas Furlong of the Art Students League.

Graham and Elinor Gibson were divorced in 1934, and she kept custody of their son David.

That year Graham met American Constance Wellman in Paris; they married in New York City in 1936 and lived in Brooklyn Heights. They were near other artists Adolph Gottlieb, David Smith, and Dorothy Dehner. Wellman was instrumental in editing Graham's book System and Dialectics of Art, which he published in 1937. Graham and Wellman worked for Hilla Rebay in 1938, helping her execute the first exhibition of the Museum of Non-Objective Painting, which later developed to become the Solomon R. Guggenheim Museum. Along with many others, Graham and his wife struggled financially during the Great Depression. They moved to Mexico for its lower cost of living, and continued to live there on and off. Wellman and Graham separated in August 1942, dividing their assets equally. Wellman initiated subsequent divorce proceedings, on the grounds of "extreme cruelty, mental in nature" committed by Graham. The divorce was finalized in the state of Nevada on July 16, 1945.

During the 1940s Graham married for the fifth time, to Marianne Schapira Strate. She had a grown daughter, Ileana Sonnabend, who was then married to Leo Castelli. They both became influential in the New York art world and were known as independent gallery owners and dealers.

Graham served as a mentor to younger artists such as Jackson Pollock, Richard Pousette-Dart, Willem de Kooning, and Arshile Gorky. He introduced Ileana and Leo Castelli to his artist friends in the New York art world. He was also considered influential to Lee Krasner (Pollock's wife and an artist in her own right), David Smith, Dorothy Dehner, and Mark Rothko. Graham claimed to have befriended Picasso and many other important European modernists while living in Paris and in Russia. He often entertained and lectured the younger American artists in New York City about modernist ideas. He was frequently the bearer of radical new insights into art and creativity.

In 1942 Graham curated a group show at the McMillen Gallery that exhibited work by Jackson Pollock (in his first exhibition in New York City), Lee Krasner, Willem de Kooning, and Stuart Davis. He showed them with work by well-established European artists: Pablo Picasso, Henri Matisse, Georges Braque, Pierre Bonnard, and Amedeo Modigliani.

Along with Stuart Davis and Hans Hofmann, Graham is considered a mentor for the younger American artists above, who comprised many of the Abstract expressionist generation of American painters and sculptors. He was the author of System and Dialectics of Art (1937), a treatise on art, modernism and the avant-garde. It was an enormously influential text during the 1940s and supported the modernist movement.

During this period and into the 1950s, Graham also continued to paint, developing a "unique figurative style" derived from classical forms; he was especially influenced by the works of Raphael, Leonardo da Vinci, Nicolas Poussin, and Jean-Auguste-Dominique Ingres. He signed these paintings with "Ioannus", the Latin form of John and Ivan. Among his first works in this style were paintings and drawings of Russian soldiers completed about 1943, drawn from his own experience in the imperial army during World War I.

== Death and legacy ==
Graham died of generalized reticulum cell sarcoma in London on June 27, 1961.

After his death, Graham's art of his last two decades was the subject of increasing scholarly and market interest. In 1968, MOMA circulated a traveling exhibition of his works from this period, John D. Graham/Paintings and Drawings.
