= Oneida Corners, New York =

Oneida Corners
- hamlet
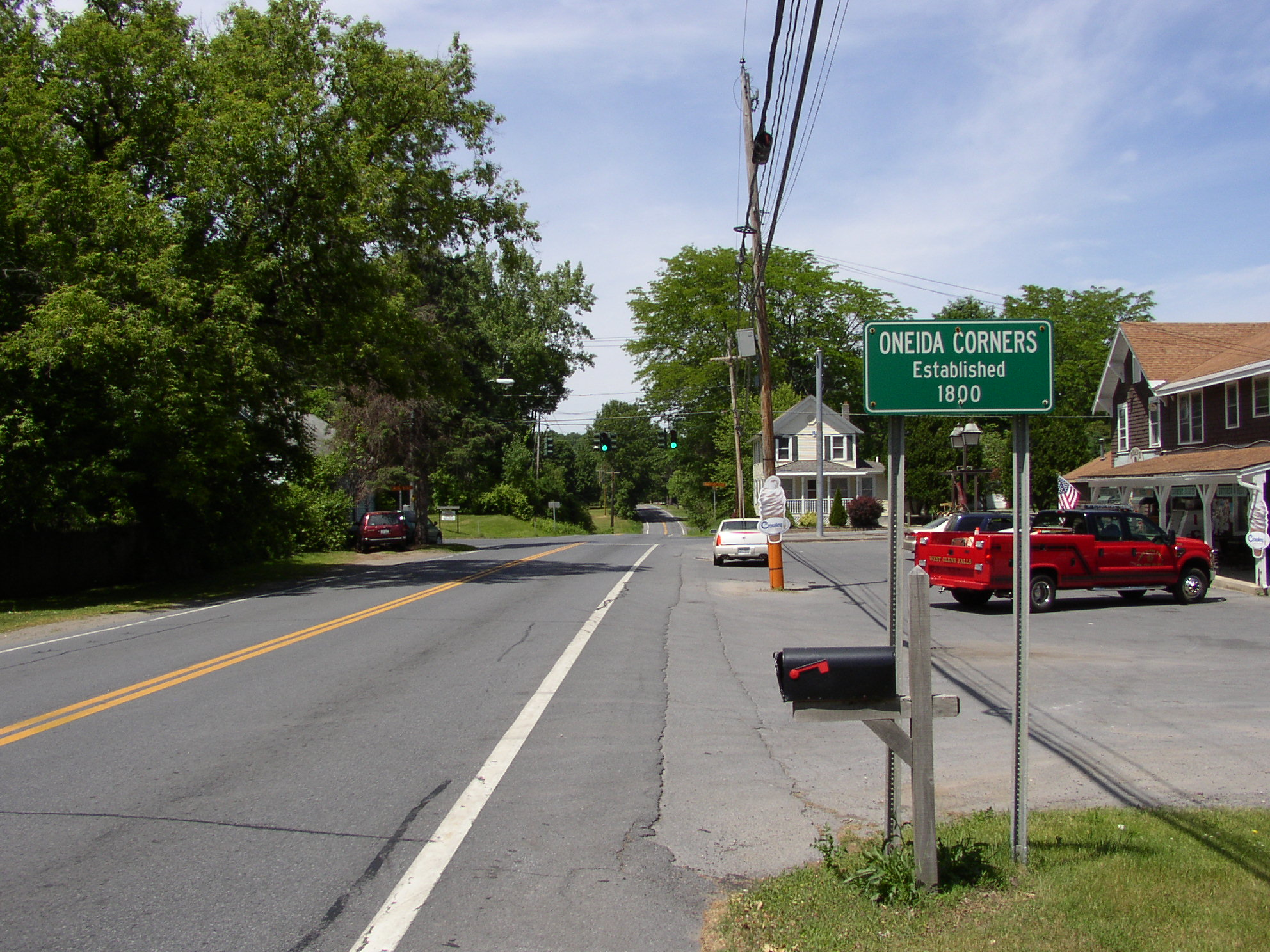
- Sign along New York State Route 9L indicating Oneida Corners.

- Location within the state of New York
- Coordinates: 43°22′31″N 73°37′44″W
- Country: United States
- State: New York
- County: Warren
- Town: Queensbury
- unincorporated: c. 1800
- Elevation: 376 ft (115 m)
- Time zone: UTC-5 (Eastern (EST))
  - Summer (DST): UTC-4 (EDT)
- Area code: 518

Oneida Corners is a hamlet within the town of Queensbury in Warren County in the U.S. state of New York.

== Geography ==
Oneida Corners is situated at the intersection of New York State Route 9L (Ridge Road), extending west along County Route 54 (Sunnyside Road) and east along County Route 39 (Sunnyside Road East).

== History ==
Around the time of the American Revolutionary War, the hamlet was a prominent settlement featuring two inns, three shops, a lumber business, mechanic shops, and a church. Court was held at least once weekly in the hamlet. Shortly before the war, an Oneida Indian by the name of Thomas Hammond ran a thriving business at the corner. His establishment being a frame of reference, the area came to be known as "the Oneidas" — and later as Oneida Corners — around 1800.
