= Wilhelmina Weber Furlong =

German American artist and teacher (1878–1962)

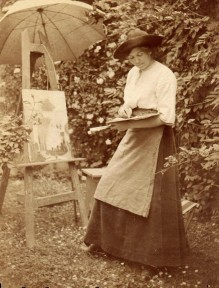
- Weber Furlong 1898 in Paris
- Born: November 24, 1878; St. Louis, Missouri
- Died: May 25, 1962 (aged 83); Glens Falls, New York
- Education: Art Students League
- Known for: Painting
- Movement: Modern art, abstract art, Fauvism, Impressionism, Post-Impressionism, Expressionism, Cubism
- Spouse: Tomás Furlong (artist)
- Patrons: Gertrude Stein, Etta Cone, Claribel Cone, Oliver Gould Jennings, Hyde Collection Museum, Tang Museum, Bolton Museum, Weber Furlong Foundation, Studio 98, Skidmore College
- Website: www.weberfurlong.org

Wilhelmina Weber Furlong (1878–1962) was a German American artist and teacher.

Among America's earliest avant-garde modernist painters, Weber Furlong pioneered modern impressionistic and modern expressionistic still life painting at the turn of the twentieth century's American modernist movement.

She is considered by some the first female modernist painter. Furlong's path reflects similar struggles of women artists during the late 1800s and early 1900s who found themselves subjugated to the tastes of realist instructors who opposed both modernism in art and women artists.

== Biography ==
Weber Furlong's long and active artistic career spanned 1892 to 1962, during which time she thrived as a modernist artist working in St. Louis, Mexico City, New York City, and Paris. Beginning in 1892, Weber Furlong was instructed by artists including Emil Carlsen, William Merritt Chase, and Edmund H. Wuerpel of the St. Louis School of Fine Arts.

She was in Paris from 1897 to 1906, where she attended the Salon d'Automne for three years and became acquainted with Pablo Picasso, Paul Cézanne, and others who exhibited at the Paris Salon.

From 1906 to 1913, Weber Furlong painted in Mexico City before moving to New York City where she lived and worked until 1947. While residing in New York, Weber Furlong worked in the rural retreats of Glens Falls, New York, and Bolton Landing, New York, where she hosted fellow artists at her Golden Heart Farm from 1952 to 1962.

In America, Weber Furlong's significant circle of friends and acquaintances includes John Graham, Willem de Kooning, David Smith, Dorothy Dehner, Jean Charlot, Edward Hopper, Alexander Calder, Rockwell and Sally Kent, Thomas Hart Benton, Allen Tucker, Max Weber, Kimon Nicolaides, and many others. As a student, she was associated with the Art Students League as a young woman prior to 1900 and in 1913 began a serious role in the New York art scene at the Art Students League as a Secretary Treasurer and member of the Board of Control along with her husband, the artist Tomás Furlong (artist). She taught art for over 56 years in New York and she was active with the Whitney Studio Club during the formative years of the organization in New York City a fact revealed in the Studio Club archives. In 1923 Weber Furlong was exhibiting at the architectural league of New York.

== Legacy and honors ==
Weber Furlongs' close association in Bolton Landing, New York with the sculptor David Smith has had a lasting influence on the hamlet to this very day and she is known to be responsible for bringing him to the farm he purchased there with his wife sculptor and painter Dorothy Dehner. Weber Furlong's works are on permanent display at the Bolton Landing Museum.

The Hyde Collection in Glens Falls, New York has displayed the works of Wilhelmina Weber Furlong since 1966 where they hosted a major solo retrospective of the artist's work after her death in 1962. The Tang Museum at Skidmore College holds a work by Weber Furlong which has been exhibited regionally since 1952. In the early 1950s Skidmore College in Saratoga Springs, New York held solo exhibitions of the works of Weber Furlong for several years and she exhibited alongside the artist David Smith at the State Capital in Albany, New York. The Ft. Edward Art Center hosted a solo exhibition in May 1994.

Starting in late September 2012 through early April 2013, The International Woman's Foundation in Marfa, Texas held a major retrospective of the works of Weber Furlong featuring over 75 unseen works and private belongings of the artist including her Victorian easel. The one woman show was held at the Iconic Building 98 studio galleries along with a lecture by Professor Emeritus James K. Kettlewell, retired curator of the Hyde Collection.

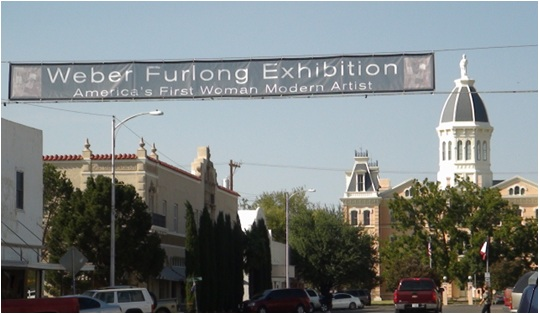
Marfa, Texas Chinati Weekend, 2012, Marfa, Texas

In Spring of 2012, Wilhelmina Weber Furlong became the subject of a documentary film based on the biography on the life of the popular early American woman modernist. A permanent display of the work of Wilhelmina Weber Furlong is at the Bolton Landing, New York town history museum.

On August 7, 2012 the Crandall Public Library in Glens Falls, New York hosted a documentary film crew and lecture on Wilhelmina Weber Furlong featuring James K. Kettlewell, Professor Emeritus at Skidmore College and retired curator of the Hyde Collection, where they displayed one of Wilhelmina Weber Furlong's lost works.

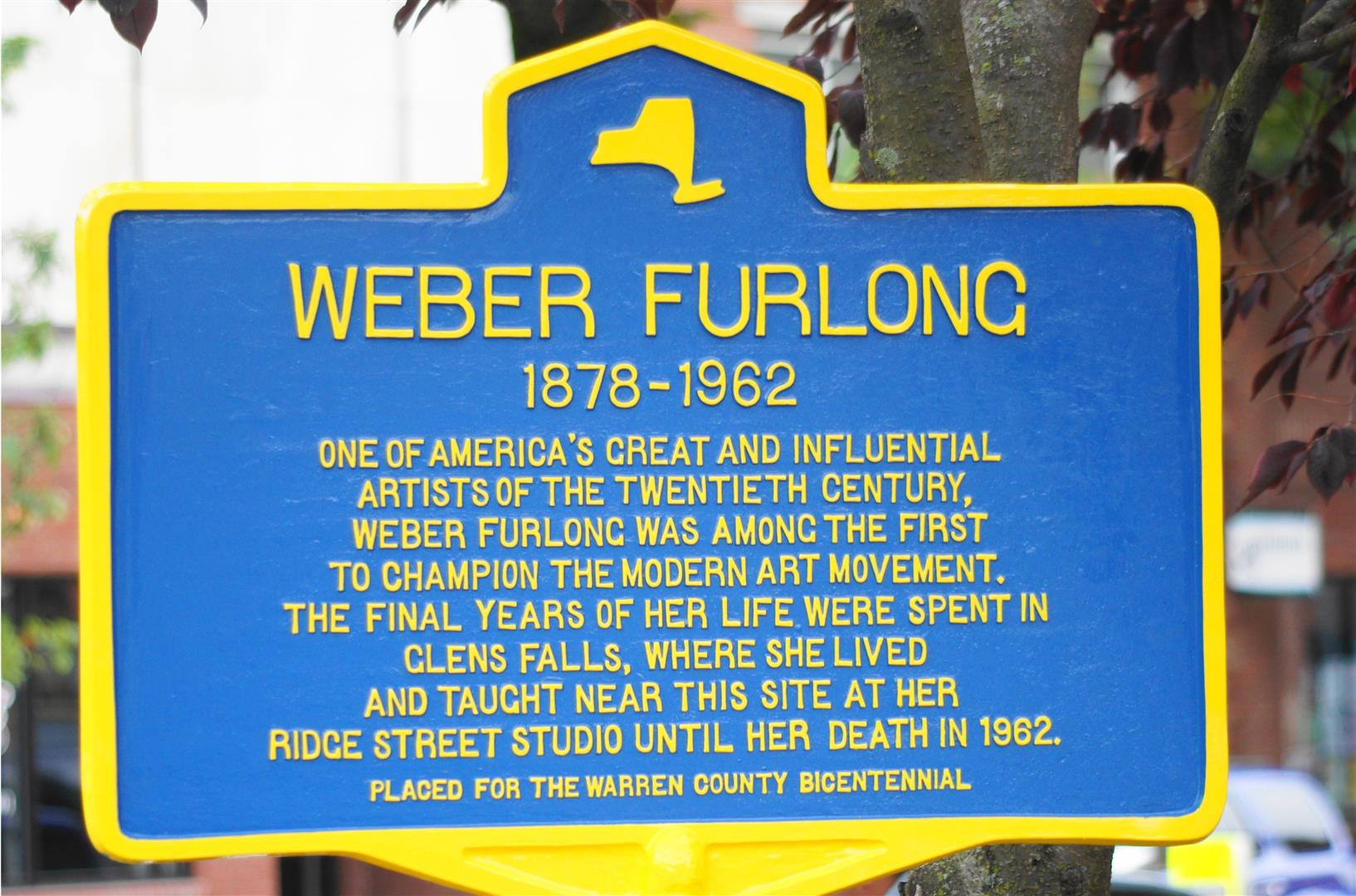
New York State Historic Marker located at City Hall in Glens Falls, New York

On July 23, 2013 the City Glens Falls, New York Common Council approved a resolution to place a New York State historical marker in downtown Glens Falls near City Hall. The resolution stated: "Weber Furlong (1878–1962) One of America's great and influential artists of the twentieth century, Weber Furlong was among the first to champion the Modern art movement. The final years of her life were spent in Glens Falls, where she lived and taught near this site at her Ridge Street studio until her death in 1962. Placed for the Warren County Bicentennial."

2019 Lake George, New York "Two Centuries of Art from Bolton Landing" Bolton Historical Society Museum. Landscapes Lost and Found.

2019 Dublin, Ireland Weber Furlong Her Life. Her Art. Her Legacy. The exhibition presented by Clint Weber, Director and Curator of The Weber Furlong Collection of Modern Art; Mona Blocker Garcia of the International Woman’s Foundation and artist Martin De Porres Wright, in association with the Irish Georgian Society. Knight of Glin Exhibition Room, City Assembly House, South William Street. Dublin, Ireland.

2022 Manhattan New York, The Art Students League of New York. Proudly presented To Live is to Paint: Wilhelmina Weber Furlong, Dorothy Dehner and American Modernism July 21 – August 23, 2022 Phyllis Harriman Mason Gallery. Wilhelmina Weber Furlong, Dorothy Dehner and American Modernism, curated by the League’s 2022 guest curator, Jillian Russo PhD. To Live is to Paint follows Furlong’s and Dehner’s artistic influences from their extensive travels to their close friendships throughout the 1920s and 1930s.

2022 Austin, Texas Prizer arts and Letters community organization and gallery. Wilhelmina Weber Furlong. Struggled to be taken seriously as an artist, both because of her gender and because of resistance to the modernist movement. She persisted, stating that, “To live is to paint.
