= Bolton Landing, New York =

Bolton Landing
- hamlet & CDP
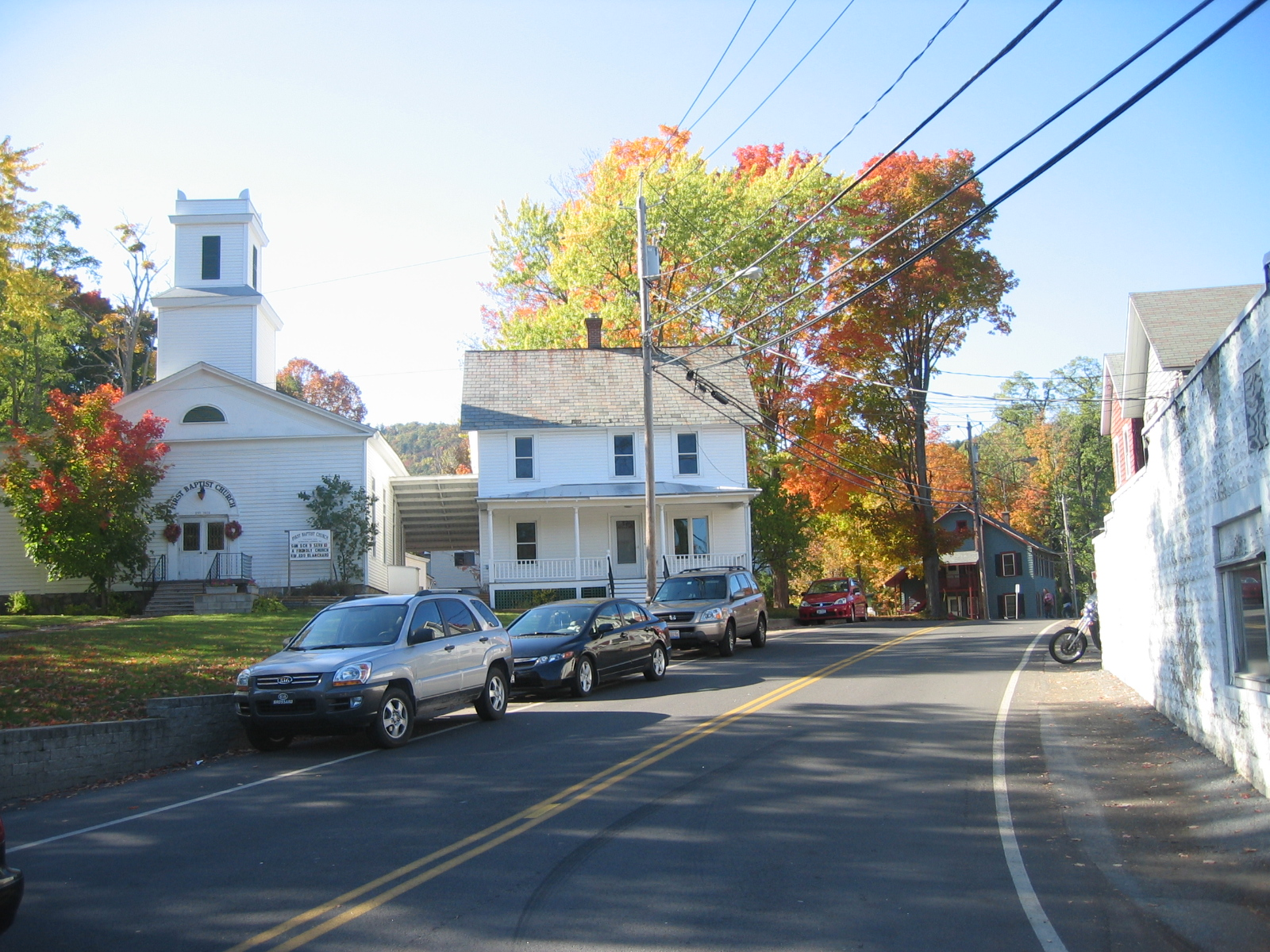

- Location of Bolton Landing in New York
- Coordinates: 43°33′26″N 73°39′17″W
- Country: United States
- State: New York
- County: Warren
- Elevation: 361 ft (110 m)
- ZIP code: 12814
- GNIS ID: 944411

Bolton Landing is a hamlet and census-designated places in the town of Bolton in Warren County, New York. It is located on Lake George in the Adirondack Mountains. It is a common tourist destination and the closest town to the State Park lands and islands of the Lake George Narrows. The hamlet's most notable structure is The Sagamore Hotel, a renovated Victorian-era hotel. The population at the time of the 2020 Census was 518.

== History ==
The community was founded in 1799, and was a stop off point for logging vessels on Lake George.

The Marcella Sembrich Opera Museum and Sagamore Hotel Complex are listed on the National Register of Historic Places.

== Geography ==
Bolton Landing is ten miles north of Lake George village on the west side of Lake George in the town of Bolton. The closest city is Glens Falls, south of Lake George village. New York Route 9N passes through the community.

There are four public beaches, some of which are adjacent to public docks.

== Culture ==
Home of the Bolton Landing Barbershop Quartet Festival for 14 years, the international harmony singing event drew crowds and visitors from around the world and was featured on several television shows, including an hour long special in Japan. The festivals popularity reached its peak in 1999, as hundreds of barbershop enthusiasts, along with their friends and families packed into the small town of Bolton Landing for the annual Labor Day Barbershop Quartet competitions. The festival, originally started by Bolton native Andy Pratt, ended in 2002.

The Marcella Sembrich Opera Museum at Bolton Landing on the shore of Lake George commemorates the internationally known Polish soprano Marcella Sembrich (1858–1935), whose favorite composers included Vincenzo Bellini and Gaetano Donizetti. In addition to her career in Europe, Sembrich had more than 450 performances at the New York Metropolitan Opera. Her lakeside summer mansion was opened as a museum in 1937 and is listed in the National Register of Historic Places.

Every year since 1989, the Bolton Recreation Commission's summer free concert series in Roger's Memorial Park has been anchored by Bolton native and summer resident Matt Finley performing with his band, Rio Jazz.

Since 2005, Bolton Landing has been home to the Lake George Theater Lab, a theater company devoted to new American plays and adaptations. Bolton Landing was also the home of sculptor David Smith, and is where he did a large percentage of his work. Smith was introduced to the hamlet through Wilhelmina Weber Furlong, the early American avant-garde modernist painter who pioneered the modernist movement in Bolton Landing, New York at Golden Heart Farm.

== Demographics ==
Historical population
Census	Pop.	Note	%±
2010	513		—
2020	518		1.0%

== Notable places in Bolton Landing ==
Bolton Landing comprises several notable locations such as: the Bolton Landing Marina, Newphers Deli and convenience store, the veterans memorial, multiple tourist beaches in and around town, the golf course, the Sagamore Hotel, and Bolton townhall.

== Parking in Bolton landing ==
Finding parking in Bolton Landing can be a challenge, especially during the summer months when tourists are most active. When it comes to finding parking in the town it is advised that you first check near the townhall as it has the largest free parking area in town other than the Tops parking lot. The town hall parking lot also features EV charging at low cost.
