= Art Students League of New York =

Art school in Manhattan, New York

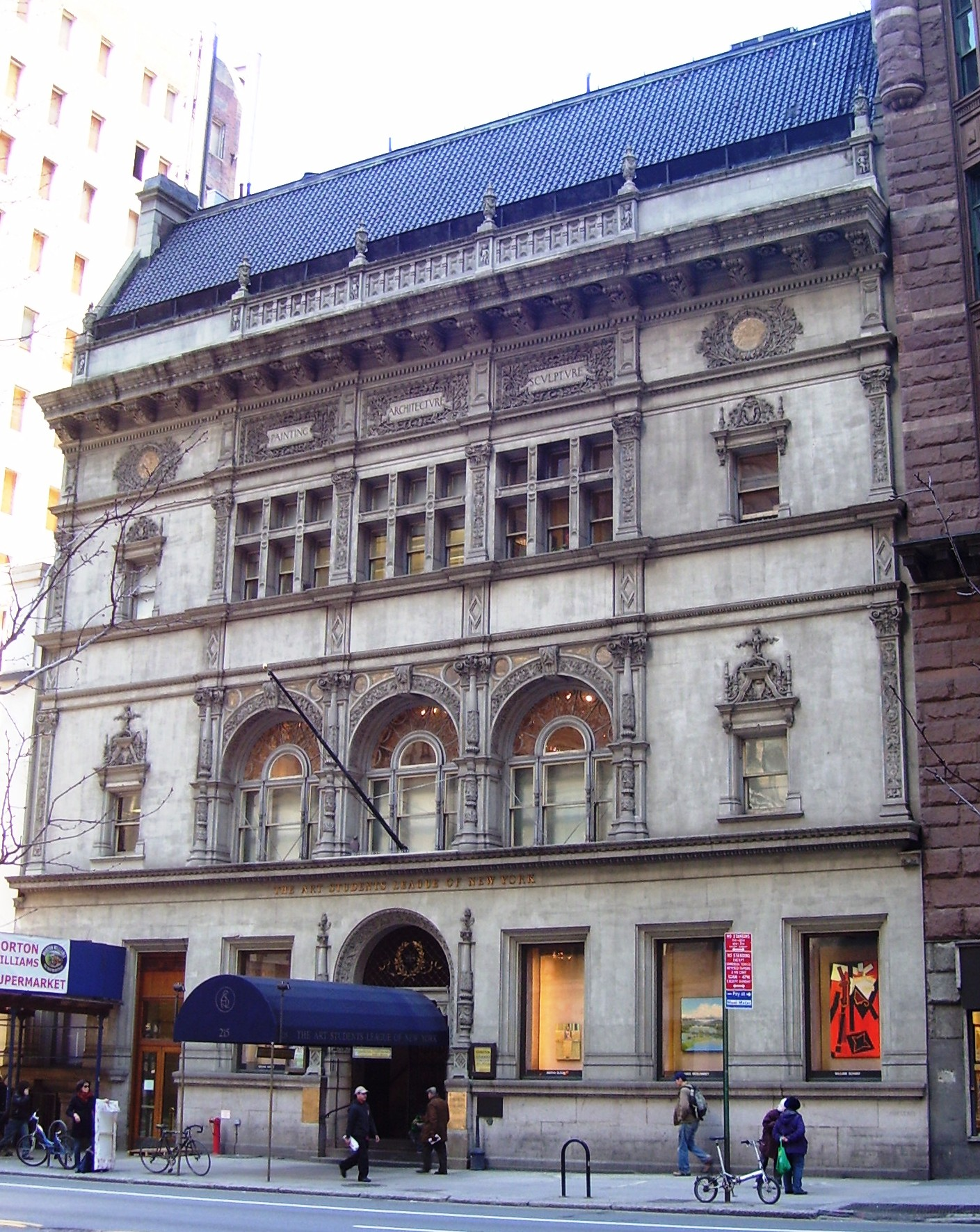
The American Fine Arts Society Building at 215 West 57th Street

The Art Students League of New York is located in the American Fine Arts Society building at 215 West 57th Street (Manhattan) in Manhattan, New York City since 1892. As one of the oldest art schools in America, the League is known for the informal attitude that pervades its ateliers. Although artists may study full-time, or, as in the case of many historic alumni and staff, over the course a lifetime, there have never been any degree programs or grades. From the 19th century to the present, the League has counted among its attendees and instructors many historically important artists, and contributed to numerous influential schools and movements in the art world. The school's motto Nulla Dies Sine Linea or "No Day Without a Line" is traditionally attributed to the Greek painter Apelles by the historian Pliny the Elder, who recorded that Apelles would not let a day pass without at least drawing a line to practice his art.

The League participated in the founding of the American Fine Arts Society (AFAS) in 1889, together with the Society of American Artists and the Architectural League, among others. The American Fine Arts Building at 215 West 57th Street is designed in the French Renaissance style by one of the founders of the AFAS, architect Henry Hardenbergh (in collaboration with W.C. Hunting & J.C. Jacobsen). The building is a designated New York City Landmark and is listed on the National Register of Historic Places.

== History ==
=== 19th century ===
Founded in 1875, the League's creation came about in response to both an anticipated gap in the art instruction program of classes at New York's National Academy of Design for that year, and to longer-term desires for more variety and flexibility in education for artists than it was felt the Academy provided. The breakaway group of students included many women, and was originally housed in rented rooms at 16th Street and Fifth Avenue. When the Academy resumed a more typical but liberalized program in 1877, there was some feeling that the League had served its purpose, but its students voted to continue its program, and it was incorporated the following year. Influential board members from this formative period included painter Thomas Eakins and sculptor Augustus Saint-Gaudens. Membership continued to increase, forcing the League to relocate to increasingly larger spaces.

The painter Edith Dimock, a student from 1895 to 1899, described her classes at the Art Students League:

In a room innocent of ventilation, the job was to draw Venus (just the head) and her colleagues. We were not allowed to hitch bodies to the heads——yet. The dead white plaster of Paris was a perfect inducer of eye-strain, and was called "The Antique". One was supposed to work from "The Antique" for two years. The advantage of "The Antique" was that all these gods and athletes were such excellent models: there never was the twitch of an iron-bound muscle. Venus never batted her hard-boiled egg eye, and the Discus-thrower never wearied. They were also cheap models and did not have to be paid union rates.

In the late 1890s and early 1900s, an increasing number of women artists came to study and work at the League many of them taking on key roles. Among them was Wilhelmina Weber Furlong, accompanied by her husband Thomas Furlong. The avant-garde couple served the league in executive and administrative roles and as student members throughout the American modernism movement. Alice Van Vechten Brown, who would later develop some of the first art programs in American higher education, also studied with the league until prolonged family illness sent her home.

In his official biography, My Adventures as an Illustrator, Norman Rockwell recounted his time studying at the school as a young man, providing insight into its operation in the early 1900s.

=== 20th century ===
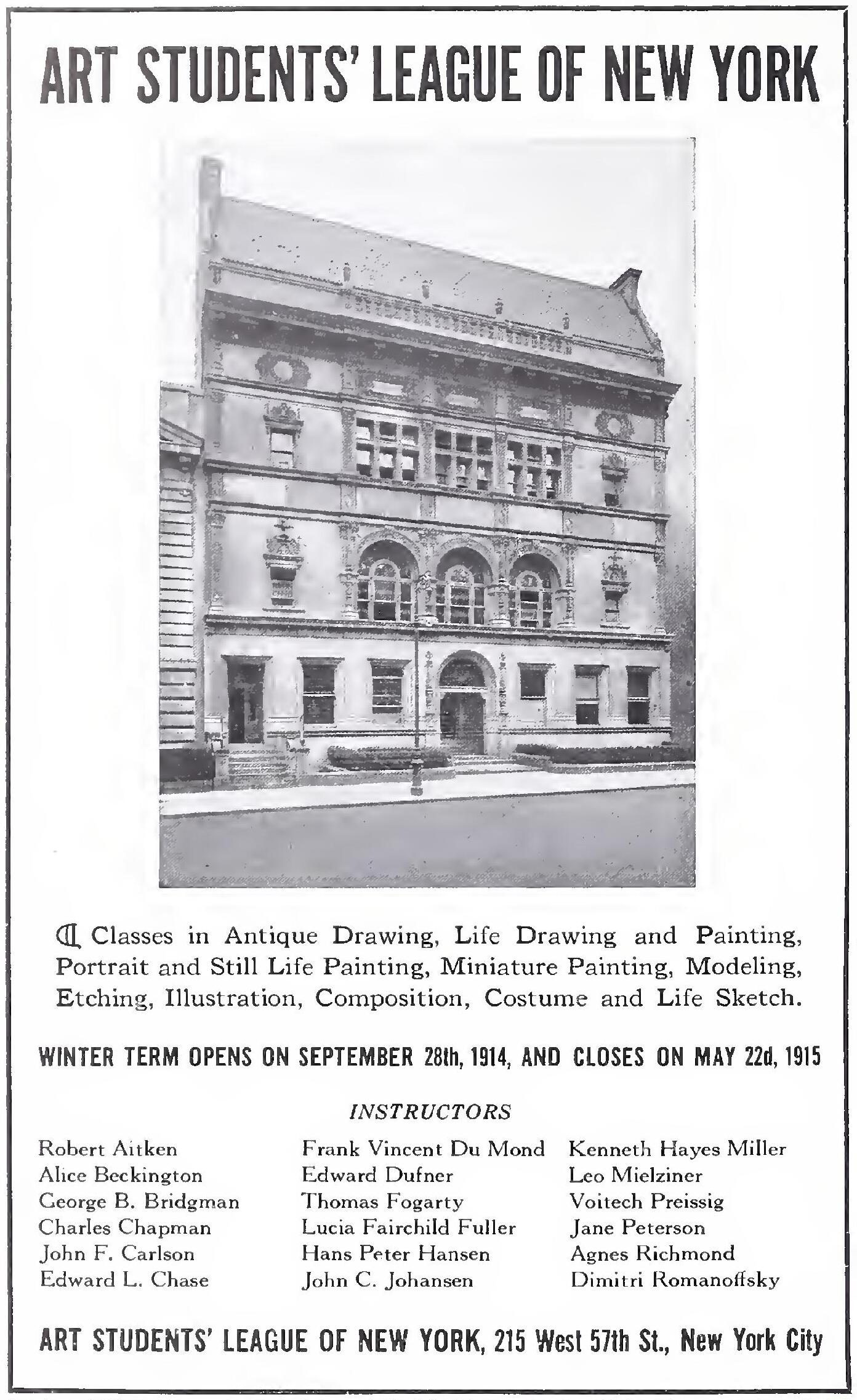
Advertisement in The International Studio (magazine) of 1914

The League's popularity persisted into the 1920s and 1930s under the hand of instructors like painter Thomas Hart Benton, who counted among his students there the young Jackson Pollock and other avant-garde artists who would rise to prominence in the 1940s. In 1925 to celebrate their golden jubilee (fifty years), the League organized an exhibition which included the work of members, students and instructors. Gertrude Vanderbilt Whitney gave a reception at which Charles Dana Gibson was toastmaster.

Between 1942 and 1943, many of the League's students joined the armed forces to fight in World War II, and the League's enrollment decreased from 1,000 to 400, putting it in danger of closing in mid-1943. In response, five hundred artists donated $15,000, just enough to keep the League from closing. In the years after World War II, the G.I. Bill played an important role in the continuing history of the League by enabling returning veterans to attend classes. The League continued to be a formative influence on innovative artists, being an early stop in the careers of Abstract expressionists, Pop Artists and scores of others including Lee Bontecou, Helen Frankenthaler, Joseph Glasco, Al Held, Eva Hesse, Roy Lichtenstein, Donald Judd, Knox Martin, Robert Rauschenberg, James Rosenquist, Cy Twombly, and many others vitally active in the art world.

In 1968, Lisa M. Specht was elected first female president of the League. The League's unique importance in the larger art world dwindled somewhat during the 1960s, partially because of higher academia's emergence as an important presence in contemporary art education, and partially due to a shift in the art world towards minimalism, photography, conceptual art, and a more impersonal and indirect approach to art making.

=== 21st century ===
As of 2010, the League continues to attract a wide variety of artists, and its focus on art made by hand, both figurative and abstract, remains strong. Its continued significance has largely been in the continuation of its original mission, which is to give access to art classes and studio access to all comers regardless of their means or technical background. The League publishes an online journal of writing on art-related topics, called LINEA.

== Other facilities ==
From 1906 until 1922, and again after the end of World War II from 1947 until 1979, the League operated a summer school of painting at Woodstock, New York. In 1995, the League's facilities expanded to include the Vytlacil campus in Sparkill, New York, named after and based upon a gift of the property and studio of former instructor Vaclav Vytlacil.

== Notable instructors and lecturers ==
Since its inception, the Art Students League has employed notable professional artists as instructors and lecturers. Most engagements have been for a year or two, and some, like those of sculptor George Grey Barnard, were quite brief.

Others have taught for decades, notably: Frank DuMond and George Bridgman, who taught anatomy for artists and life drawing classes for some 45 years, reportedly to 70,000 students. Bridgman's successor was Robert Beverly Hale. Other longtime instructors included the painters Frank Mason (DuMond's successor, over 50 years), Kenneth Hayes Miller (40 years) from 1911 until 1951, sculptor Nathaniel Kaz (50 years), Peter Golfinopoulos (over 40 years), Knox Martin (over 45 years), Ronnie Landfield (over 30 years), Martha Bloom (over 30 years) and the sculptors William Zorach (30 years), and Jose De Creeft, Will Barnet (50 years) from the 1930s to the 1990s, and Bruce Dorfman, who is the longest continually-teaching instructor in the League's history (over 60 years).

== See also ==
- National Academy of Design
- Society of American Artists
- Ten American Painters
- List of art schools
- Atelier Method
