= Podmoky =

Podmoky may refer to places in the Czech Republic:

- Podmoky (Havlíčkův Brod District), a municipality and village in the Vysočina Region
- Podmoky (Nymburk District), a municipality and village in the Central Bohemian Region
- Podmoky, a village and part of Krásná Hora nad Vltavou in the Central Bohemian Region

== See also ==
- Podmokly (disambiguation)
