= I. Rice Pereira =

American abstract artist, poet and philosopher (1902–1971)

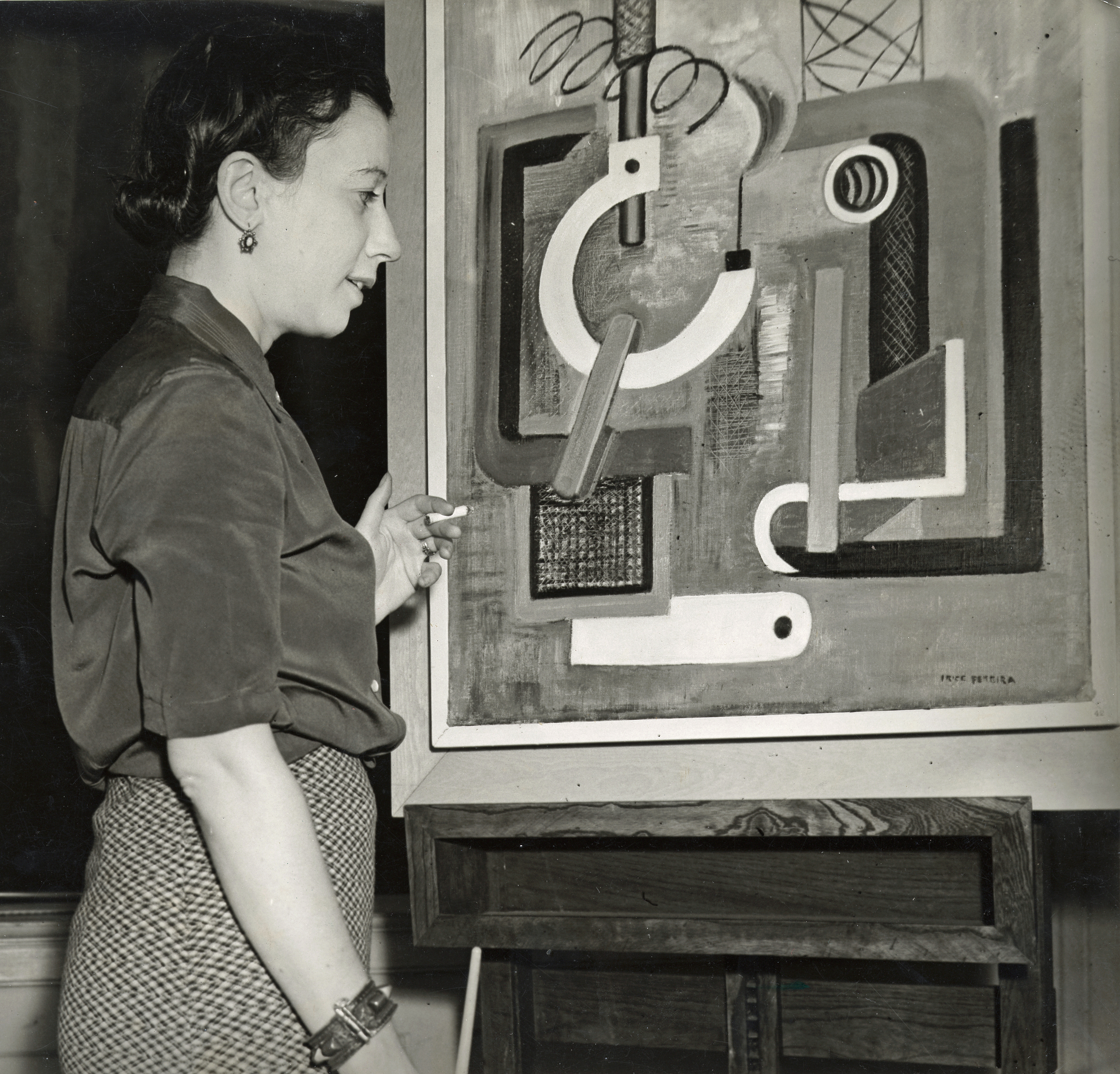
- Pereira, 1938
- Born: Irene M. Rice; August 5, 1902; Chelsea, Suffolk County, Massachusetts, US
- Died: January 11, 1971 (aged 68); Marbella, Spain
- Education: Art Students League of New York; Traphagen School of Fashion
- Occupations: Artist; poet; philosopher
- Movement: Bauhaus
- Spouse(s): Humberto Pereira (m. 1929; div. 1938) George Wellington Brown Jr (m. 1942; div. 1950) George Reavey (m. 1950; div. 1959)
- Relatives: Juanita Guccione (sister)
- Website: Official website

Irene Rice Pereira (née Rice; August 5, 1902 – January 11, 1971), known professionally as I. Rice Pereira, was an American abstract artist, poet and philosopher who played a major role in the development of modernism in the United States. Pereira is known for her work in the genres of geometric abstraction, abstract expressionism and lyrical abstraction, as well as her use of the principles of the Bauhaus school. Her paintings and writings were significantly influenced by the complex intellectual currents of the 20th century.

== Early life ==
Irene M. Rice was born August 5, 1902^{α} in Chelsea, Massachusetts to Emery Rice^{β} and Hilda Rice (née Vanderbiet). Pereira's father, a baker, was born in Poland and immigrated to the United States as a child. Pereira's maternal grandfather was born in Vienna, and her maternal grandmother was born to a Polish Jewish family in Poznań.

Pereira was the eldest of four siblings, and was the older sister of the painter Juanita Guccione (née Anita Rice). She spent her childhood in Great Barrington, Massachusetts, where she spent time reading and writing poetry. After her father died in 1918 she and her family moved to Brooklyn, New York. In 1922 she began working as a stenographer in an accountant's office to help support her family in the wake of her father's death. She briefly attended courses in fashion design at the Traphagen School of Fashion and night courses in literature at New York University, and began taking evening art classes at Manhattan's Washington Irving High School. She immersed herself in the bohemian world of Greenwich Village and had a brief affair with the poet and novelist Maxwell Bodenheim.

== Beginnings as an artist ==
In 1927, she enrolled in night art classes at the Art Students League in New York City. Among her instructors at the Art Students League were Jan Matulka and Richard Lahey. In her 1929 class Matulka provided Pereira with her first exposure to the artistic principles of the European avant-garde that would shape her work; most notably those of the Bauhaus, Cubism, and Constructivism (art). In 1931, she traveled to Europe and North Africa to further her painting studies, attending sessions at the Académie Moderne and studying with Amédée Ozenfant in Paris. She also spent time in Switzerland and Italy.

After returning to New York in 1933 she studied briefly with Hans Hofmann at the Art Students League. Her friends and colleagues were Burgoyne Diller, Dorothy Dehner, David Smith, Hilla Rebay, Arshile Gorky, John D. Graham, and Frederick Kiesler.

== The Design Laboratory ==
In 1935, Pereira helped found the Design Laboratory, a cooperative school of industrial design established under the auspices of the Works Progress Administration. The curriculum of the Design Laboratory was similar to that of the Bauhaus. All students were required to take a basic course that included an introduction to chemistry, physics, and art materials. Students experimented with materials in laboratories in order to understand their physical properties. There was an emphasis on social considerations, and students were taught the social implications of technological developments alongside classes in art, music, and literature. Pereira taught classes in painting, composition, and design synthesis.

She continued teaching at the Design Laboratory when it lost its financial support from the Works Progress Administration on June 27 of 1937. On July 1, 1937 the Design Laboratory became part of the FAECT School, located at 114 E. 16th St. New York. When classes resumed on September 27 of 1937 the school was known as The Laboratory School of Industrial Design. She resigned her position in October 1939.

== Mid and later years ==
Pereira painted throughout her life. Her paintings first gained recognition in the early 1930s, when she exhibited at the ACA Galleries and the Whitney Museum of American Art in New York. With the showcase at the Whitney, she became one of the first women (along with Loren MacIver and Georgia O'Keeffe) to be given a retrospective at a major New York museum. In the late 1930s, she started to move away from realistic work toward abstraction and experimented with painting on layered glass. In 1943, Pereira was included in Peggy Guggenheim's show Exhibition by 31 Women at the Art of This Century gallery in New York. In 1946, Pereira was included in the Museum of Modern Art's exhibition 1946:Fourteen Americans.

During the latter part of her career, Pereira rejected abstract expressionism and experienced difficulties with gallery owners and museum directors. She believed that art and literature were being swallowed up in "a chaotic void of mindlessness." Eventually, she left New York permanently and moved to Spain. She died of emphysema on January 11, 1971, in Marbella, Spain.

== Style ==
Boat Composite by I. Rice Pereira, 1932, Whitney Museum of American Art

Abstraction by I. Rice Pereira, 1940, Honolulu Museum of Art

Pereira was interested in exploring the role of the artist in society, believing artists to be on a par with industrialists. She created "machine paintings" that incorporated images of technological components, including ship's ventilators, generators, and funnels, as well as hinges, levers, and gears. Boat Composite from 1932, in the collection of the Whitney Museum of American Art is an example of her "machine paintings".

Pereira began to explore abstraction in the late 1930s and her work included fewer references to machines. She became known for the geometric and rectilinear paintings created during this period. Abstraction from 1940, in the collection of the Honolulu Museum of Art, demonstrates her approach to geometric abstraction. She was interested in finding a way to bring light into her work, and began to incorporate materials such as glass, plastic, gold leaf, and other reflective materials into her paintings. She experimented with radium paint, layers of painted glass, and paint on parchment.

In a 1950 statement, she said "My philosophy is the reality of light and space; an ever flowing--never-ceasing--continuity, unfettered by man made machinery, weight and external likenesses. I use geometric symbols because they represent structural essences and contain infinite possibilities of change and dynamics."

Pereira signed her work as "I. Rice Pereira," which caused many people to assume that she was a man.

Cataloging of her works can be problematic as she frequently left works untitled and reused titles.

== Personal life ==
On January 8, 1929, Pereira married Humberto Pereira, a commercial artist. The couple later divorced on January 28, 1938.

On September 26, 1942 Pereira married George Wellington Brown Jr (1901–1962) a photographic technician at Curtiss-Wright and member of the United States Air Force. Brown and Pereira separated in the summer of 1949 and divorced the following year in Florida.

In August 1949, Pereira meet George Reavey, an Irish-Russian surrealist poet, literary agent, publisher, and translator. On September 9, 1950 Perieira and Reavey married in London. Pereira left Reavey on December 13, 1955 and the couple divorced on July 19, 1959.

== Writings ==
Pereira worked prolifically as a writer, but she never received the same acclaim in this area as she did in painting. She published her first article in 1944, titled An Abstract Painter on Abstract Art. Her writings included topics such as structure, time, optics, and space. Her self-published book The Lapis discussed her dreams about the philosopher's stone. The original manuscript of The Lapis, 1954-1955, is housed at Houghton Library, Harvard University, and was a gift of Mrs. Irene Rice Pereira in 1958. The Lapis was republished in 1957 for a limited 1000 book run. She also wrote poetry and in 1968 she became an Honorary Poet Laureate of the United Poets' Laureate International, which is headquartered in the Philippines. She published her last work, The Poetic of the Form on Space, Light and the Infinite in 1969.

Published writings by Pereira include: Light and the New Reality (1951), The Transformation of Nothing (1952), The Paradox of Space (1952), The Nature of Space (1956), The Lapis (1957), Crystal of the Rose (1959), Space, Light and the Infinite (1961), The Simultaneous 'Ever-Coming To Be' (1961), The Infinite Versus the Finite (1962), The Transcendental Formal Logic of the Infinite (1966), and The Poetics of the Form of Space, Light and the Infinite (1968).

== Collections ==
The Boca Raton Museum of Art, the Brooklyn Museum, the Hirshhorn Museum and Sculpture Garden, the Honolulu Museum of Art, the National Gallery of Art (Washington D.C.), The Phillips Collection (Washington D.C.), the Smithsonian American Art Museum, the University of Iowa Museum of Art, the Baltimore Museum of Art (Baltimore, Maryland), the Metropolitan Museum of Art (New York City), the Addison Gallery of American Art (Andover, Massachusetts), the Museum of Modern Art (New York City), the Dallas Museum of Art (Dallas, Texas), the Munson-Williams-Proctor Institute (Utica, New York), the Frances Lehman Loeb Art Center (Poughkeepsie, New York), the Whitney Museum of American Art(New York City), and the Philadelphia Museum of Art (Philadelphia, Pennsylvania) are among the public collections holding work by I. Rice Pereira.

== Art works ==
Listed Chronologically:

- (1932) Boat Composite Whitney Museum of American Art
- (1932) Untitled (Boats at Cape Cod) Smithsonian American Art Museum
- (1936) Sketch for Machine Composition #2 Smithsonian American Art Museum
- (1937) Machine Composition #2 Smithsonian American Art Museum
- (c.1938) Abstract Composition Whitney Museum of American Art
- (c.1938) Abstract Composition(II) Whitney Museum of American Art
- (1939) White Rectangles, Number 3 Metropolitan Museum of Art
- (1939) Abstract, Rose Art Museum at Brandeis University
- (1939-1940) Red Form Baltimore Museum of Art (Note: Pereira, Irene Rice. "Red Form". Baltimore Museum of Art.)
- (1940) Abstraction Honolulu Museum of Art
- (1940) Shadows with Painting Museum of Modern Art
- (1940) Three White Squares Private Collection
- (c. 1940) Untitled (Two Triangles) Philadelphia Museum of Art
- (c. 1940) Transparent Plants Rose Art Museum at Brandeis University
- (1941) White Lines Metropolitan Museum of Art
- (1942) Red, Yellow, and Blue Baltimore Museum of Art (Note: Pereira, Irene Rice. "Red, Yellow, and Blue". Baltimore Museum of Art.)
- (1942) White Lines Museum of Modern Art
- (1944) Green Depth Metropolitan Museum of Art
- (1945) Rose Planes Walker Art Center
- (1945) Quadrangles in Two Planes Art Institute of Chicago
- (1946) Transfluent Lines National Gallery of Art
- (1946) Transversion The Phillips Collection
- (1948) Composition Walker Art Center
- (1948) Oblique Progression Whitney Museum of American Art
- (1949) Vacillating Progression Munson-Williams-Proctor Art Institute (Note: Pereira, Irene Rice. "Vacillating Progression". Munson-Williams-Proctor Institute.)
- (1950) Bright Depths Hirshhorn Museum and Sculpture Garden
- (1950) Green Mass National Gallery of Art
- (1951) You Whitney Museum of American Art
- (1951) Evaporating Night Dallas Museum of Art
- (1951) Two Becomes One Hirshhorn Museum and Sculpture Garden
- (1952) Shooting Stars Metropolitan Museum of Art
- (1952) Daybreak Metropolitan Museum of Art
- (1952) Somewhere Today Brooklyn Museum
- (1953) Zenith National Gallery of Art
- (1953) Mecca Smithsonian American Art Museum
- (1953) Roselit Day Smithsonian American Art Museum
- (1954) Threshold of Eternity Hirshhorn Museum and Sculpture Garden
- (1954) Heart of Light Whitney Museum of American Art
- (1955) Landscape of the Absolute Whitney Museum of American Art
- (1959) Efflorescence Of Space Hirshhorn Museum and Sculpture Garden
- (1960) Omega Baltimore Museum of Art (Note: Pereira, Irene Rice. "Omega". Baltimore Museum of Art.)
- (1961) The Celestial Gate Sways on the Ringing Swells Smithsonian American Art Museum
- (1964) Light Extending Itself Brooklyn Museum
- (No Date) Heart of Flame Smithsonian American Art Museum
- Plates from The Lapis, 1954. This book is held in the collections of many museums and universities, including; the Baltimore Museum of Art, the Metropolitan Museum of Art, the National Gallery of Art, the Philadelphia Museum of Art, the Museum of Modern Art, the Yale University Library, the Houghton Library of Harvard University, and others.
- (1954) Version No 2, 12/25/54, Image from Dream, 11/29/54 National Gallery of Art
- (1954) II. The Lapis in a Vertical Position, Man - God, Soul - Spirit National Gallery of Art
- (1954) III. Vertical View of the Lapis from Above, Mediaeval Image of the World-View National Gallery of Art
- (1954) IV. Renaissance Image of the World-View National Gallery of Art
- (1954) V. The Image in Perspective National Gallery of Art

== Notes ==
^α Rice often cited her birth year as 1907 and appears on some legal documents.

^β Also known as Emanuel Rice.
