= Podmokly =

Podmokly may refer to places in the Czech Republic:

- Podmokly (Klatovy District), a municipality and village in the Plzeň Region
- Podmokly (Rokycany District), a municipality and village in the Plzeň Region
- Podmokly, a village and part of Úněšov in the Plzeň Region
- Děčín IV-Podmokly, a part of Děčín in the Ústí nad Labem Region

== See also ==
- Podmoky (disambiguation)
