= Jan Matulka =

Czech-American artist (1890–1972)

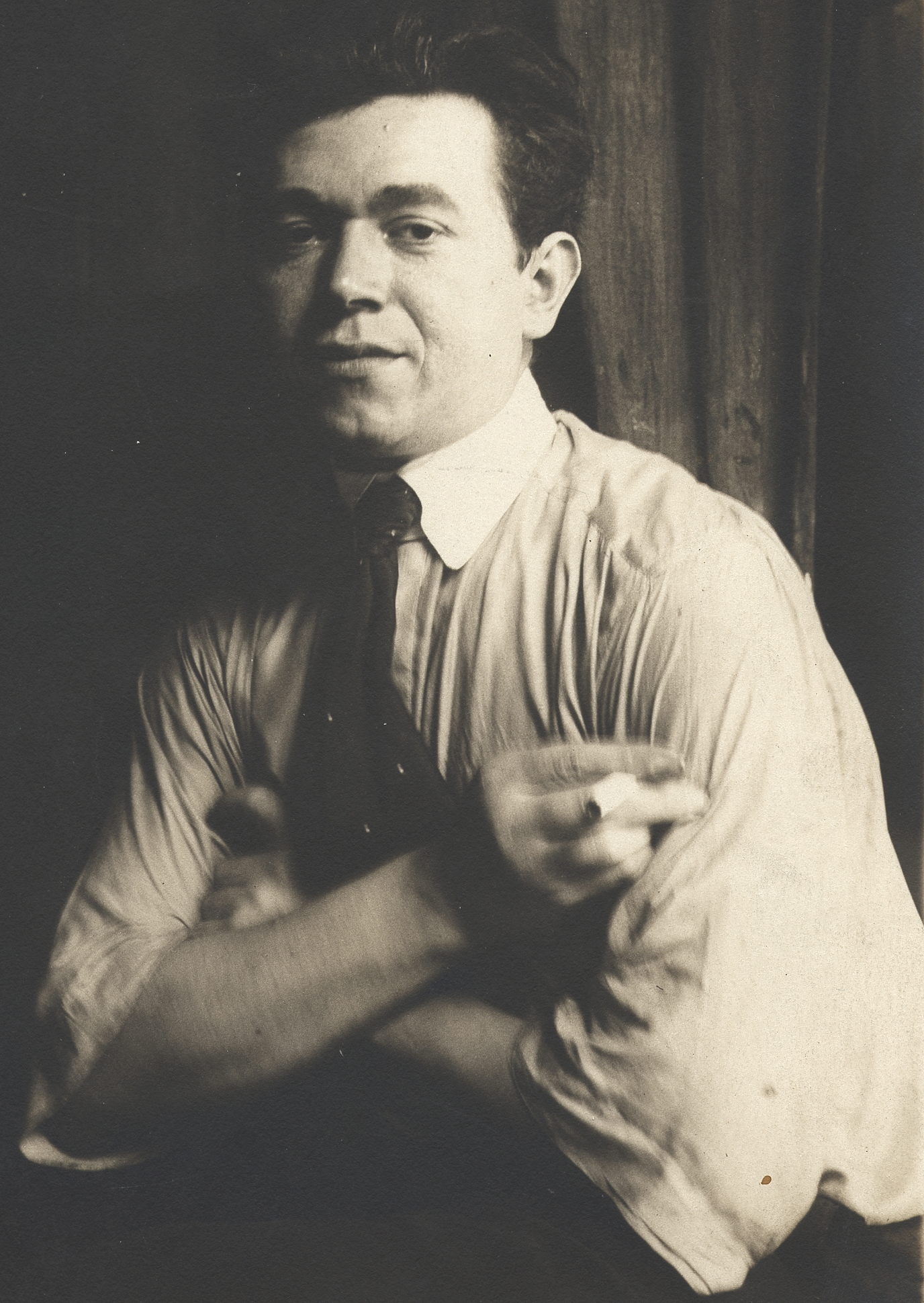
- Matulka c. 1920
- Born: 7 November 1890; Vlachovo Březí, Austria-Hungary
- Died: 25 June 1972 (aged 81); New York City, US
- Resting place: Flushing Cemetery, Flushing, Queens
- Education: National Academy of Design
- Known for: painting
- Movement: Modernism
- Spouse: Lída Matulka
- Awards: Joseph Pulitzer National Traveling Scholarship; 1917
- Patrons: Katherine Sophie Dreier

Jan Matulka (7 November 1890 – 25 June 1972) was a Czech-American modern artist originally from Bohemia. Matulka's style ranged from Abstract expressionism to landscapes, sometimes in the same day. He has directly influenced artists like Dorothy Dehner, Francis Criss, Burgoyne Diller, I. Rice Pereira, and David Smith.

== Early life ==
Matulka was born on 7 November 1890 in Vlachovo Březí, Bohemia, then part of Austria-Hungary and now part of the Czech Republic. In 1907 Jan, his parents Maria and John, and his five younger sisters moved to the Bronx. Soon after John separated from Jan's mother and left the family alone and with little money.

In 1908 Jan Matulka began studying at the National Academy of Design in New York City. Upon graduation in 1917 Matulka met Ludmila "Lída" Jiroušková who would on 1 May 1918 become his wife. Lída Matulka worked for the New York Public Library as the head of the Czechoslovak literature section and helped connect her husband to the larger cultural community.

Between 1917 and 1918 Matulka traveled around the United States and the Caribbean as the first recipient of the Joseph Pulitzer National Traveling Scholarship, painting as he went. While in the Southwest he became one of the first modern artists to portray the Hopi snake rain dance.

== Work ==
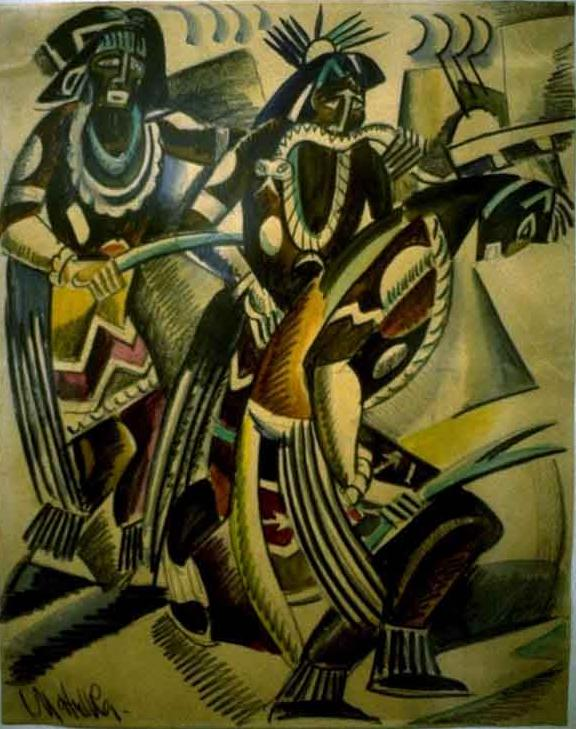
Jan Matulka, Hopi Snake Dance #2 (1918)

In 1919 Matulka illustrated Czechoslovak Fairy Tales with writer Parker Fillmore and published by Hippocrene Books. In 1920 the pair compiled a second book, The Shoemaker's Apron, published by Harcourt Brace & Company

The next few years Jan and Lida traveled to Czechoslovakia to visit the old family farm, as well as to Germany and France. Matulka found inspiration in the scenery of Tŭri Pôle village, a place that fueled many more paintings over the years. Jan established a studio in Paris and would over-winter there while Lida returned to New York City each October. In Paris he was acquaintances with Gertrude Stein, André Lhote, Jean Lurçat, Josef Šíma, Václav Vytlačil, and Albert Gleizes.

In the 1920s Matulka maintained both his studios, frequently traveling to and fro from Paris to New York City. Around the middle of the decade Matulka began painting stark and jazzy cityscapes. This by no means meant he limited himself to that style, as he was also painting landscapes in Cape Ann, as well as Abstract pieces.

Katherine Sophie Dreier became his patron briefly from 1925 to 1926, which came to a premature end mainly due to petty disagreements and Matulka's general lack of social grace, ranging from tardiness to tantrums. In November 1926 he started to contribute illustrations to The New Masses.

In 1927, Matulka began an association with the Frank K. M. Rehn Gallery. The clientele of the gallery wanted more conservative and representational works so Matulka complied because he needed the income. Again, this did not prevent him from painting in other styles for other outlets. In 1928 he began drawing from the model when he started meeting with the Society of Independent Artists, while contributing illustrations to the socialist Dělník Kalendar.

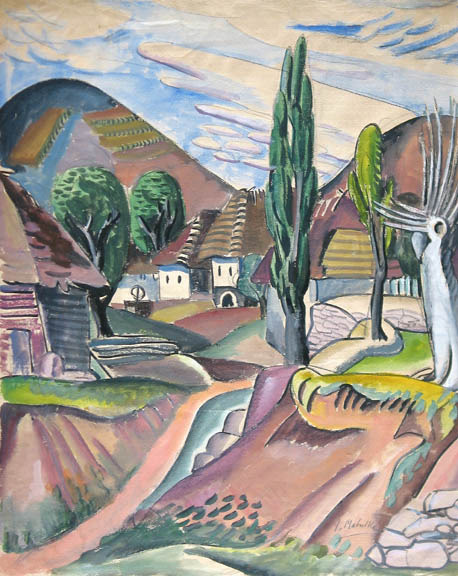
Jan Matulka, Tŭri Pôle Landscape (1921)

With help from Max Weber and Václav Vytlačil Matulka landed a teaching job at the Art Students League of New York, his first salaried position. Being the only modernist faculty member, his classes were quite popular. His students include Dorothy Dehner, Francis Criss, Burgoyne Diller, I. Rice Pereira, David Smith, Jacob Burck, and Esther Shemitz. The lattermost would later state that Matulka was the greatest influence on his work. Matulka was pushed out of his position at the Art Students League by conservative factions in 1931, but with encouragement from students he continued teaching a private class, which later disbanded in 1932. Matulka continued teaching one-on-one classes for a time after that.

Personal and global financial woes soon prevented Matulka from traveling annually to Paris. In 1928 he sublet his studio there to jazz painter Stuart Davis. Later Josef Šíma sublet it, taking it over completely from Matulka in 1934. Šíma stored all Matulka's paintings and other works left in the studio, eventually transporting them to his own house in Fontainebleau, where these things did not survive World War II.

From 1934 until it ended in 1935 Matulka became one of the few abstract painters to join the Public Works of Art Project, giving him a taste for murals and public art. Immediately afterward he joined the Federal Art Project and also worked on the Williamsburg Houses, eventually completing two murals, both of which were eventually destroyed or painted over.

== Isolation and death ==
In 1936 Matulka helped found the American Abstract Artists, but refused to join the group. His emotional state continued to decline, even more so when his sister Barbara killed herself on 5 July. By the time his association with the Federal Art Project ended in 1939 he had become even more socially and emotionally isolated. He continued painting more and more experimental works.

Over the next few decades Matulka received much acclaim from his exhibitions, but remained relatively withdrawn from society. As age caught up with him, he suffered from many health issues, including deafness. Matulka died 25 June 1972 in New York City.

== Exhibitions ==
- June 1920: Société Anonyme, New Jersey (group show with Patrick Henry Bruce, James Daugherty, and Van Everen)
- 1924: Salon des Indépendants, Paris
- 1924: Exhibition of American Art, Paris
- 1924: Neue Galerie, New York City (two-person show with James Ormsbee Chapin)
- 1925: Artist's Gallery cooperative, New York City (solo)
- 1926: Art Center, New York City (solo)
- 1926: Brooklyn Museum, Brooklyn, New York (group show)
- 1927: Frank K. M. Rehn Gallery, New York City (two-person show with Hayley Lever)
- 1929: Columbia University, New York City (solo)
- 1929: Frank K. M. Rehn Gallery, New York City (solo)
- 1930: Frank K. M. Rehn Gallery, New York City (solo)
- 1931 or 1932: Art Students League of New York, New York City (group show with Stuart Davis, John D. Graham, and Arshile Gorky)
- Spring 1932: Montclair Art Museum, Montclair, New Jersey
- 1933: Frank K. M. Rehn Gallery, New York City (solo)
- 1936: Museum of Modern Art, New York City (group)
- 1942: Macy's, New York City (group show with Adolph Gottlieb, Mark Rothko, Carl Holty, John D. Graham, and Arshile Gorky)
- 1944: ACA Galleries, New York City (solo)
- 1965: Zabriske Gallery, New York City (solo)
- 1979: Whitney Museum of American Art, New York City (solo)
- 21 November 1980 – 8 February 1981: Smithsonian American Art Museum, Washington, D.C. (solo)
- 21 September – 14 November 1982: Solomon R. Guggenheim Museum, New York City (solo)
- 1989: Robert Schoelkopf Gallery, New York City (solo)
- 1992: James Graham & Sons, New York City (two-person show with Václav Vytlačil)
- 1995: Thomas McCormick Gallery, Chicago (solo)
- 1999: Richard York Gallery, New York City
- - 7 April 2002: National Academy Museum and School, New York City (group show with Stuart Davis, Arthur Dove, Georgia O'Keeffe, Robert Motherwell, Ellsworth Kelly, Ilya Bolotowsky, Carl Holty, Willem de Kooning, Robert Rauschenberg, and others)
- 18 September 2004 – 16 January 2005: Montclair Art Museum, Montclair, New Jersey
- 1 March – 1 May 2005: Greenville County Museum of Art, Greenville, South Carolina
- 18 June – 24 July 2005: Lowe Art Museum, Coral Gables, Florida
- 9 July – 27 August 2005: Thomas McCormick Gallery, Chicago
- 27 August – 27 November 2005: Georgia Museum of Art, Athens, Georgia
- 14 January – 19 March 2006: Avampato Discovery Museum, Charleston, West Virginia
- 9 April – 11 June 2006: Butler Institute of American Art, Youngstown, Ohio
- 10 June – 9 September 2006: Cape Ann Historical Museum, Gloucester, Massachusetts
- 6 July – 19 August 2007: Arkansas Arts Center, Little Rock, Arkansas
- 15 December 2007 – 3 February 2008: Lowe Art Museum, Coral Gables, Florida (group show with many artists from Art Students League of New York)
- 10 April – 7 September 2008: British Museum, London (group show, The American Scene: Prints from Hopper to Pollock)
- 28 February – 19 April 2009: Djanogly Art Gallery, Nottingham (group show, The American Scene: Prints from Hopper to Pollock)
- 2 May – 31 August 2009: Brighton Museum & Art Gallery, Brighton (group show, The American Scene: Prints from Hopper to Pollock)
- 19 September – 13 December 2009: Whitworth Art Gallery, Manchester (group show, The American Scene: Prints from Hopper to Pollock)
- 19 March – 22 August 2009: Jersey City Museum, Jersey City, New Jersey (group show with Louis Lozowick, Riva Helfond, Elsie Driggs, and Victoria Hutson Huntley)
- 12 August -–18 October 2009: Centre de Cultura Contemporània de Barcelona, Barcelona (group show with Man Ray, Miguel Covarrubias, and many others)
- 29 July – 16 October 2011: Academy Art Museum, Easton, Maryland (Modernist Inclinations: The Art of Jan Matulka)

== Selected bibliography as illustrator ==
- Fillmore, Parker; Jan Matulka (1919). Czechoslovak fairy tales, retold by Parker Fillmore; with illustrations and decorations by Jan Matulka. W. Collins, Sons & Co.
- Fillmore, Parker; Jan Matulka (1920). The Shoemaker's Apron: A Second Book Of Czechoslovak Fairy Tales And Folk Tales. Harcourt Brace & Company. ISBN 978-0-548-98371-3.
- Van Roosbroeck, Gustave Leopold; Jan Matulka (1929). Grotesques. Living Art.
- Fillmore, Parker; Jan Matulka (November 1998). Czech, Moravian and Slovak Fairy Tales. Hippocrene Books. ISBN 978-0-7818-0714-2.
