= Juanita Guccione =

American painter (1904–1999)

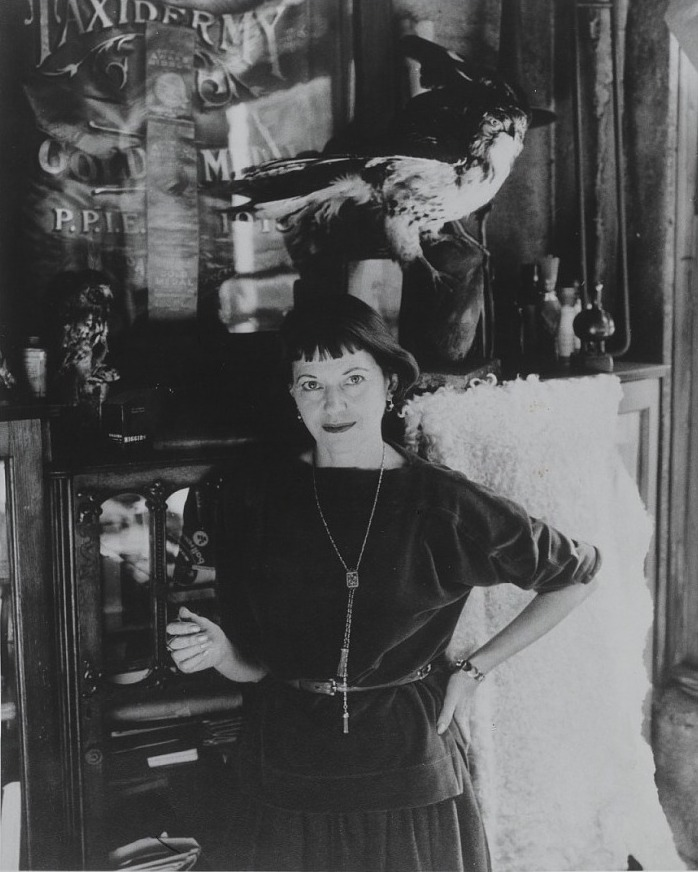
- Guccione in 1967
- Born: Anita Rice; June 20, 1904; Chelsea, Massachusetts, U.S.
- Died: December 18, 1999 (aged 95); New York City, U.S.
- Other names: Nita Rice, Juanita Rice, Juanita Mabrouk, Juanita Rice Marbrook, Juanita Rice Guccione
- Education: Pratt Institute, Art Students League of New York
- Movement: Cubist, realist, Surrealist
- Spouse: Dominick J. Guccione (m. 1943–1959; death)
- Partner: Ben Aissa Mabrouk
- Children: Djelloul Marbrook
- Relatives: Irene Rice Pereira (sister)

Juanita Rice Marbrook Guccione (née Anita Rice; June 20, 1904 – December 18, 1999) was an American painter, and taxidermist.

During the 1930s she changed her name from Anita to Nita, and then later to Juanita Rice. She had used her partners last name Mabrouk, but later Americanized his name to Marbrook, and lastly she remarried in 1943 and used the surname Guccione.

== Biography ==
Anita Rice was her name at birth, she was born on June 20, 1904, in Chelsea, Massachusetts. Rice was the second oldest, and had three siblings including Irene Rice Pereira. She was raised in Pittsfield, Great Barrington, and Brooklyn. When she was young, she worked as a fashion model in New York City.

She studied at Pratt Institute, followed by study at the Art Students League of New York, and later with Hans Hofmann from the mid-1930s to 1944. During the early 1930s she lived among the Ouled Naïl people in eastern Algeria, where she met Ben Aissa Mabrouk. Together with Ben Aissa Mabrouk, they had a child, Djelloul Marbrook born in 1934.

She was married to Dominick J. Guccione in 1943, a noted Woodstock taxidermist and that marriage ended with his death in 1959. After his death, she took over his taxidermy business, and moved to New York City where she did a lot of taxidermy-based interior decor such as animal skin rugs.

Guccione had held solo art exhibitions of her paintings in New York City, Woodstock, Washington D.C., Paris, Algeria and in India. In 1946 and 1947, her work was part of the Carnegie Prize exhibitions, Painting in the United States. In 2019, her work was in a postmortem exhibition, Juanita Guccione: Otherwhere at the Napa Valley Museum in Yountville.

Algeria acquired many of Guccione's pieces for their Museum of Fine Arts but roughly 700 pieces of her work remain in her son's possession which is a key reason she is largely unknown today.

Several of her 1940s paintings feature stiff-looking birds and animals that came from her husbands taxidermy shop.

== Exhibitions ==
- 2025: Juanita Guccione: A Divine Gamble, Lincoln Glenn Gallery, New York City, New York
- 2019: Juanita Guccione: Otherwhere, Napa Valley Museum, Yountville, California
- 2007: For the People: American Mural Drawings of the 1930s and 1940s, Frances Lehman Loeb Art Center, Vassar College, Poughkeepsie, New York
- 2001: Manhattan Sisters: I. Rice Pereira, Juanita Guccione, Fletcher Gallery, Woodstock, New York
- 1975: Juanita Guccione: Surrealist Paintings, Zarre Gallery, New York City, New York
- 1946: Painting in the United States, Carnegie Prize, New York City, New York
- 1947: Painting in the United States, Carnegie Prize, New York City, New York
