= Samuel M. Kootz =

American art dealer (1898–1982)

Samuel M. Kootz (23 August 1898 – 7 August 1982) was a New York City art dealer and author whose Kootz Gallery was one of the first to champion Abstract Expressionist painting.

Between 1945 and 1966, in galleries on 57th Street or Madison Avenue, this "tall, genial southerner" represented avant-garde American and European artists. In the 1930s and early forties, while working in advertising and the fabric industry, Kootz had found time to write about modern art. In two books and letters to the New York Times he decried realistic American regionalism and European-inspired abstraction while urging American artists to create a new form of expressive abstract art. His gallery became a proving ground for his aesthetic ideas. In 1947 he gained renown by holding the first American exhibition of wartime Picassos. He purchased the Picassos by flying to Paris in late 1946, introducing himself to Picasso and convincing him that sales of his work would help to support the Kootz Gallery's inventive young artists : William Baziotes, Romare Bearden, Byron Browne, Adolph Gottlieb, Carl Holty, and Robert Motherwell. Over the years Kootz continued to buy paintings directly from Picasso. Kootz also exhibited work by Georges Braque, Fernand Léger, James Brooks, Giorgio Cavallon, Arshile Gorky, David Hare, Hans Hofmann, Ibram Lassaw, Herbert Ferber, Raymond Parker, William Ronald, Tony Rosenthal, Conrad Marca-Relli, Georges Mathieu, Emil Schumacher, Pierre Soulages, Kumi Sugaï, Zao Wou Ki, and others. In 1962, the eminent critic Clement Greenberg praised Kootz by comparing him favorably to other dealers. While Greenberg considered some dealers to be successful "financially and artistically" and a few others to be "dedicated and creative," Kootz was the only one to whom he could ascribe all of those attributes.

== Early years ==
Samuel Melvin Kootz was born on August 23, 1898, in Portsmouth, Virginia. He received a Bachelor of Law degree from the University of Virginia in 1921 and practiced law for a year. While attending college he spent many weekends in New York City, observing modern art in its most advanced art galleries, especially those run by Alfred Stieglitz and Charles Daniel. Between 1919 and 1921 he became acquainted with progressive artists, including Peter Blume, Charles Demuth, Preston Dickinson, Carl Holty, Yasuo Kuniyoshi, John Marin, and Max Weber. Kootz moved to New York in 1923, pursuing a career in advertising while involving himself in the city's art world. During this period he began to purchase art. For instance, in fall 1928 he bought Peter Blume's The Bridge for $600. from the Daniel Gallery.

== Proselytizing for Modern Art ==
Beginning in 1930 and continuing into the 1940s with books, articles, forceful letters to the New York Times and other activities, Kootz urged artists to sever their dependence on Europe, to drop the search for typically “American” art, and to find original, gutsy forms of expression. His first book, Modern American Painters (1930) offers critiques of Blume, Demuth, Dickinson, Arthur Dove, Kuniyoshi, Marin, Georgia O'Keeffe, Charles Sheeler, Maurice Sterne, Max Weber, and brief descriptions of seven others, including Walt Kuhn and Niles Spencer. To publicize that book, Kootz organized his first exhibition "Twenty Modern American Pictures" at Demotte Galleries, 25 E 78 Street, New York, in March 1931. Its brief catalogue, with an introduction by Kootz, shows that the exhibition comprised many, but not all, of the painters in his book. Kootz reached a broader audience in December 1931, when his article in the art section of the New York Times criticizing chauvinistic attitudes toward American art raised strong reactions and weeks of responses.

In the 1930s Kootz showed an interest in modern photography by writing articles about Sheeler and Edward Steichen (see Kootz bibliography). When he left advertising in 1934 to become a silk converter he commissioned Stuart Davis, Kuniyoshi, and Dove to create fabric designs. Working for his own firm, Samuel M. Kootz Associates, he created photographic designs for fabric during 1935-36.

- 25 September 1937, Sam Kootz and Jane Stix Ogden were married at Sheeler's home in Ridgefield Connecticut.
- 10 August 1941: As war was raging in Europe, Kootz told New York Times readers that “the future of painting lies in America.” In a letter so provocative that the Times termed it a “bombshell,” Kootz accused artists of suffering from "rigor mortis" and challenged them to seek new, original means of expression. Readers responded for months.
- January 1942 : Kootz organized exhibition of 179 contemporary American paintings" by 72 artists, in Macy’s department store.
- 1943: New Frontiers in American Painting, Kootz's second art book, presents an historical analysis and critique of contemporary American Art, expanding on ideas presented in the "bombshell" letter which it reprints. Kootz encourages artists to be a part of their time and ponders the "ultimate potential" of Abstraction ane Expressionism. Text and illustrations cover work by Byron Browne, Paul Burlin, Ralston Crawford, Adolph Gottlieb, John Graham, Carl Holty, Bernard Karfiol, Karl Knaths, Jack Levine, George L.K. Morris, Walter Quirt, Abraham Rattner, as well as more established artists, Peter Blume, Stuart Davis, Hartley, Kuniyoshi, Marin, Sheeler, Niles Spencer, and others.
- "One Man's Choice," an exhibition organized by Kootz at Edith Halpert's Downtown Gallery, included 16 painters from New Frontiers.
- Because of his growing eminence and expertise, Kootz was elected to the Board of the Municipal Art Society and to the Advisory Board of The Museum of Modern Art in 1943.
- 1943 & 1944: Publication of two mystery novels based on his knowledge of the New York art world (see bibliography)
- December 1945: Kootz's play, Home is the Hunter, presented at the American Negro Theater in Harlem, was mentioned in Eleanor Roosevelt's newspaper column, "My Day".

== The Kootz Gallery: 1945-1966 ==
After declaring (in New Frontiers) that "the duty of the gallery and museum" was to give artists "a chance to be seen" Kootz decided to "open a gallery and sponsor exactly what I felt was the future of American painting." To show that his would be "an international gallery interested in quality," Kootz began with an exhibition of Fernand Léger, held in temporary quarters, in April 1945.

=== 15 East 57 Street ===
- July 1945: The Kootz Gallery formally opened at 15 East 57 Street, representing Baziotes, Bearden, Browne, Gottlieb, Carl Holty, and Motherwell.
- 1945-1946 In addition to solo exhibitions by his artists, Kootz showed gouaches by Alexander Calder in fall 1945, and theme exhibitions such as "The Big Top" (March 1946), "Modern American Paintings from the Collection of Mr. & Mrs. Roy Neuberger" (April–May 1946), "Building a Modern Collection" (May–June 1946), and "Homage to Jazz" (Dec. 1946).
- December 1946: Kootz flew to Paris, called on Picasso, and convinced the artist to sell him paintings to help support the young painters in his gallery. The New York Times called his achievement a "brilliant coup."
- 27 January 1947: Kootz Gallery opened the first exhibition of Picasso's wartime work in the United States. The exhibition was a sellout; it attracted a large audience and was widely covered by the press.
- 1947 Kootz sent work by his gallery artists to "Introduction a la Peinture Moderne Americaine" at Galerie Maeght, Paris, with a catalogue statement by Harold Rosenberg
- Fall 1947 Hans Hofmann joins gallery, first exhibition at Kootz: Nov.-Dec. 1947
- September 1947 "Women" exhibition featuring paintings by Picasso, Braque and gallery artists followed by "Women: A Collaboration of Artists and Writers," a catalogue designed by Paul Rand, with original essays by Tennessee Williams, William Carlos Williams, Jean-Paul Sartre, and others.
- January–February 1948, Picasso exhibition
- September 1949 "The Intrasubjectives" Exhibition, featuring works by William Baziotes, Willem de Kooning, Arshile Gorky, Adolph Gottlieb, Morris Graves, Hans Hofmann, Robert Burns Motherwell, Jackson Pollock, Ad Reinhardt, Mark Rothko, Mark Tobey, and B. W. Tomlin, with a "catalogue" designed by Baziotes, Gottlieb and Hofmann.

=== Dealing Privately ===
In 1948 Kootz closed the gallery to deal privately as Picasso's "world agent" from an apartment at 470 Park Avenue. When that situation proved uncongenial and unsatisfactory he resumed operating a public gallery.

=== 600 Madison Avenue ===
In 1949 Kootz reopened the gallery at 600 Madison Avenue. Highlights of this era include:

- September–October 1949: The Intrasubjectives, exhibition and catalogue, for which Kootz chose artists he considered "the leaders of the movement" now known as Abstract Expressionism—artists who were trying to show their "personal reactions to paint, to new forms, to ideas that had no relation to reality." It included work by Willem de Kooning, Gorky, Morris Graves, Jackson Pollock, Ad Reinhardt, Mark Rothko, Mark Tobey and Bradley Walker Tomlin, in addition to the Gallery's artists.
- February–March 1950: "Black on White Paintings by European and American Artists" included DeKooning, Dubuffet, Picasso, Tobey, Tomlin and gallery artists
- March–April 1950: "Selected Paintings by the late Arshile Gorky"
- April–May 1950: "Talent 1950," an exhibition of unrecognized upcoming artists selected by Clement Greenberg and the scholar/critic Meyer Schapiro, included Elaine de Kooning, Franz Kline, Larry Rivers, and Esteban Vicente. It has been called a "signal event" of the era.
- October 1950: "The Muralist and the Modern Architect" Marcel Breuer and Hans Hofmann.
- October 1951: "Art for a Synagogue"
- March–April 1954 Mathieu and Soulages joined the Gallery roster
- mid 1950s Gottlieb and Motherwell left gallery because of Kootz's growing interest in European artists.
- March–April 1956 "Paintings and Sculpture by Picasso" featured works from 1932–1949

=== 1018 Madison Avenue ===
Following a "real upsurge of buying American painting" that had begun in the fall of 1955, the gallery moved to larger quarters at 1018 Madison Avenue in September 1956. The Gallery's opening exhibitions featured Pierre Soulages, Georges Mathieu and Hans Hofmann, as well as "Art for Two Synagogues" with sculptures by Ferber & Lassaw.

- 1958: "Picasso--5 Masterworks"
- Between 1956 and 1959 Kootz held one man exhibitions by gallery artists including Ferber, Hare, Philippe Hosiasson, Lassaw, Marca-Relli, Mathieu, Ronald, Gérard Schneider, Emil Schumacher, Soulages, Sugai and Zao Wou-Ki.

=== 655 Madison Avenue ===
As artists painted increasingly large paintings Kootz had felt cramped at 1018 Madison Avenue.

- October 1959 the gallery moved to a much larger space on the second floor of 655 Madison Avenue.
- Starting with the opening exhibition of paintings by Ronald, the gallery held one-man exhibitions of gallery artists, with the exception of "16 Artists --American and European," in May–June 1960
- April–May 1962: the Ringling Museum of Art in Sarasota, Florida, held the exhibition, "Artists of the Kootz Gallery." The event included a talk by Kootz concerning "The Inception of Abstract Expressionism--A Dealer's Point of View"
- Fall 1963: Museum of Modern Art holds major Hans Hofmann retrospective
- October 1965: In a poster announcing "Picasso, 14 paintings," Kootz wrote that the paintings showed "a continuity of Picasso's generosity in permitting Sam Kootz to make personal sections since 1946."
- In about 1964, Kootz had "almost lost interest in the gallery business" because he felt he had accomplished what he had set out to do in making Abstract Expressionism a success, and the challenge was gone. Kootz fulfilled his promise to Hans Hofmann to keep the gallery open until that artist's death, which occurred on 17 February 1966. The Kootz Gallery closed on 9 April 1966, at the conclusion of Parker's exhibition.

== Retirement ==
- In retirement Kootz enjoyed looking at paintings and purchasing some. He had written a memoir, "Reflections of an Art Dealer" which was slated for publication by Random House. However, in spring 1968 he decided not to release it, saying "I think I'll just sit on it for a year or two." (The memoir was never published.)
- Jane Kootz died on 15 March 1970
- In 1972 Kootz married Dr. Joyce Lowinson, a psychiatrist with specialties in drug addiction and pain management.
- 7 August 1982: Kootz died from cancer

== Publications by Samuel M. Kootz ==
=== Books ===
- Modern American Painters. New York: Brewer & Warren Inc., 1930 OCLC 1329404.
- New Frontiers in American Painting. New York: Architectural Book Publishing Co., Inc., Distributed by Hastings House Publishers, 1943.
- Puzzle in Paint. New York: Crown Publishers, 1943.
- Puzzle in Petticoats. New York: Crown Publishers, 1944.

=== Play ===
- Home is the Hunter, a play in three acts. 1945.

=== Selected articles ===
- “Ford Plant photos of Charles Sheeler,” Creative Art 8, April 1931, 264-267.
- "Preston Dickinson,Creative Art, May 1931
- Edward Steichen Creative Art 10 May 1932

== Bibliography ==
- Ashton, Dore. The New York School: A Cultural Reckoning. New York and London: Penguin Books, 1979. ISBN 0-14-005263-1.
- Divay, Gaby, ed. The 1949 "Intrasubjectives Exhibition" Catalogue, designed by William Baziotes, Adolph Gottlieb, and Hans Hofmann, with texts by Harold Rosenberg & Samuel M. Kootz. e-Edition. Winnipeg: University of Manitoba Archives, 2009.
- Gilot, Francoise and Carlton Lake, Life with Picasso, with an introduction by Tim Hilton. London: Virago Press, 1990. ISBN 1-85381-233-1.
- Guilbaut, Serge. How New York Stole the Idea of Modern Art: Abstract Expressionism, Freedom, and the Cold War. Chicago and London: University of Chicago Press, 1983. ISBN 0-226-31039-6 (ppbk).
- Goldstein, Malcolm. Landscape with Figures: A History of Art Dealing in the United States. New York and Oxford: Oxford University Press, 2000. ISBN 0-19-513673-X.
- Greenberg, Clement. "Samuel Kootz, Art Dealer," in Ringling Museum of Art Bulletin (I,4), April 1962, n.p.
- Lee Hall, Betty Parsons: Artist, dealer, collector. New York: Harry N. Abrams, 1991. ISBN 0-8109-3712-3.
- Mattison, Robert Saltonstall. Robert Motherwell: The Formative Years. Ann Arbor and London: UMI Research Press, 1987. ISBN 0-8357-1983-9 (pbk.).
- Perl, Jed. New Art City, New York: Alfred A. Knopf, 2005. ISBN 1-4000-4131-7(hc).
- Robson, A. Deirdre. Prestige, Profit, and Pleasure: The Market for Modern Art in New York in the 1940s and 1950s. New York & London,: Garland Publishing, 1995. ISBN 0-8153-1364-0.
- Sandler, Irving. The Triumph of American Painting: A History of Abstract Expressionism. New York, Hagerstown, San Francisco, London: Harper & Row, 1988. ISBN 0-06-430075-7.
