= Vaclav Vytlacil =

American painter and sculptor (1892–1984)

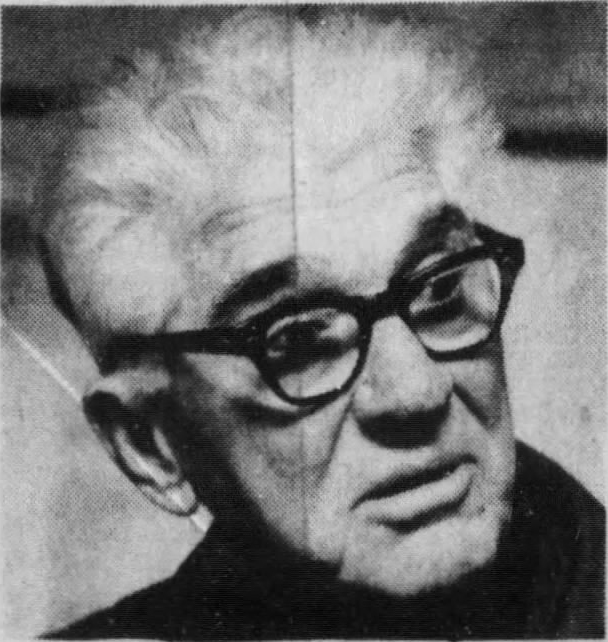
- Born: November 1, 1892; New York City
- Died: January 5, 1984 (aged 91); New York City
- Occupation: Painter, printmaker

Vaclav Vytlacil (November 2, 1892 – January 5, 1984) was an American artist and art instructor. He was among the earliest and most influential advocates of Hans Hofmann's teachings in the United States.

== Life ==
Vaclav "Vyt" Vytlacil was born in Manhattan on 2 November 1892 to Czech immigrants from Podmoky. At an early age he moved with his parents to Chicago. In 1906, he began studies at the Art Institute of Chicago, returning to New York on a scholarship to the Art Students League in 1913. While there, he studied under portraitist John C. Johansen. Vytlacil left the League to take a teaching position at the Minneapolis School of Art. He also spent time in Europe, working as an assistant to Hans Hofmann and studying the Cubist movement.

During the late 1930s and early 1940s, Vytlacil taught at a variety of places, including the Art Students League of New York City, Queens College in New York, Black Mountain College in North Carolina, the California College of Arts and Crafts in Oakland, California (now California College of the Arts), and other art schools. In 1946, he rejoined the faculty of the Art Students League and remained there until his retirement in 1978. He successfully helped get his acquaintance Jan Matulka a job at Art Students League of New York. Among his students were artists such as Louise Bourgeois, Willem de Kooning, Knox Martin, Frank O'Cain, Robert Rauschenberg, James Rosenquist, Cy Twombly, and Tony Smith among others.

He was also known for being one of the founders of the American Abstract Artists group. He died in New York City, on January 5, 1984. After his death, his daughter Anne bequeathed his estate in Rockland County to The Art Students League of New York City.

== Legacy ==
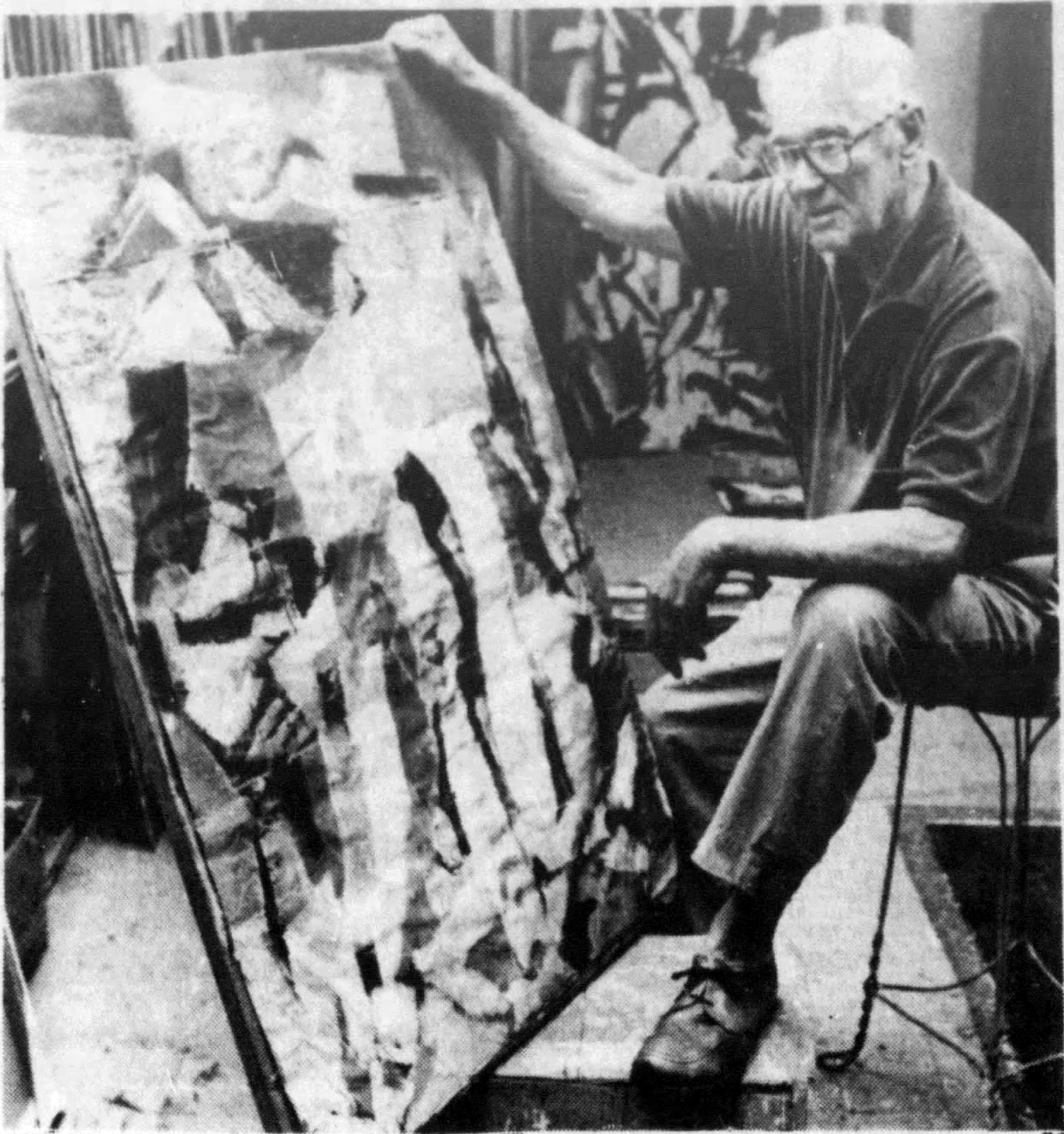
Vaclav Vytlacil in his studio, 1979

He has been ranked alongside top modernist painters including Pablo Picasso, Henri Matisse, Georges Braque, Ben Shahn, and others by a variety of critics, including Howard Devree of the New York Times.

Vytlacil's artworks are in the collections of many museums, including The Museum of Modern Art, The Whitney Museum of American Art, the Smithsonian American Art Museum, and The Metropolitan Museum of Art. Among his pupils was the sculptor Dorothy Rieber Joralemon. His student Frank O'Cain continues to teach painting, design and color composition according to Vytlacil's theoretical principals at the Art Students League of New York.
