= Djelloul Marbrook =

American poet (1934–2024)

Djelloul Marbrook, also known as Del Mabrouk (August 12, 1934 – November 23, 2024), was an American-Algerian contemporary poet, writer, and photographer.

== Biography ==
Djelloul Marbrook was born on August 12, 1934, in Algiers, Algeria, to parents Juanita Guccione (née Rice) and Ben Aissa ben Mabrouk. Marbook's father was Algerian and he moved with only his mother to New York City when he was a young child. He was raised by his extended family, primarily by his grandmother and aunts. Marbook grew up in Brooklyn, West Islip, and Manhattan. He attended Dwight Preparatory School, and Columbia University.

Marbook worked as a soda jerk, newspaper vendor, messenger, theater and nightclub concessionaire, and served in the United States Navy and as a Merchant Marine before beginning his newspaper career. Marbrook learned photography in the United States Navy and became a reporter-photographer. Marbrook was married to Wanda Ratliff from 1955 to 1963, which ended in divorce. He was also married to Marilyn Hackett Marbrook.

=== Career ===
He was a reporter for The Providence Journal and an editor for the Elmira Star-Gazette, The Baltimore Sun, Winston-Salem Journal and Sentinel, The Washington Star, and Media News newspapers in northeast Ohio, and Passaic and Paterson, New Jersey. His poems, essays, and short stories have appeared in a number of journals.

== Published works ==
=== Books ===
- Marbrook, Djelloul (2008). Far from Algiers: Poems. Issue 14 of Wick Poetry Series. Ohio: Kent State University Press. ISBN 9780873389877. winner of the 2007 Stan and Tom Wick Poetry Prize, and the 2010 International Book Award in poetry, explores the poet's feelings of not belonging to family or country.
- Marbrook, Djelloul (2010). Brushstrokes and Glances: Poems. Maine: Deerbrook Editions. ISBN 9780982810019.
- Marbrook, Djelloul (2012). Saraceno. Bliss Plot Press. ISBN 978-0-9718908-8-6.
- Brash Ice (2014, Leaky Boot Press)
- Mean Bastards Making Nice (2014, Leaky Book Press)
- Riding Thermals to Winter Grounds (2017, Leaky Boot Press)
- A Warding Circle: New York stories (2017, Leaky Boot Press)
- Air Tea with Dolores (2017, Leaky Boot Press)
- Making Room: Baltimore stories (2017, Leaky Boot Press)
- Nothing True Has a Name (2017, Leaky Boot Press)
- Even Now the Embers (2017, Leaky Boot Press)
- Other Risks Include (2017, Leaky Boot Press)
- The Seas Are Dolphin's Tears, (2018 Leaky Boot Press)
- Light Piercing Water trilogy (2018, Leaky Boot Press)
  - Book 1, Guest Boy
  - Book 2, Crowds of One
  - Book 3, The Gold Factory
- Songs in the O of Not (2019, Leaky Boot Press)
- The Loneliness of Shape (2019, Leaky Boot Press)
- Suffer the Children: Sailing Her Navel (poems) & Ludilon (novella) (2019, Leaky Boot Press)
- Lying Like Presidents, New & Selected Poems, 2001–2019 (2020, Leaky Boot Press)
- The Yellow Suitcase, New Poems | ISBN 978-1965784235 | Pierian Springs Press, 2025

== Awards ==
- Far from Algiers (2008, Kent State University Press) won the 2007 Stan and Tom Wick Poetry Prize and the 2010 International Book Award in poetry.
- "Artists Hill", an excerpt from Crowds of One, Book 2 in the Guest Boy trilogy, won the 2008 Literal Latté fiction prize.
