= Vlachovo Březí =

- Town
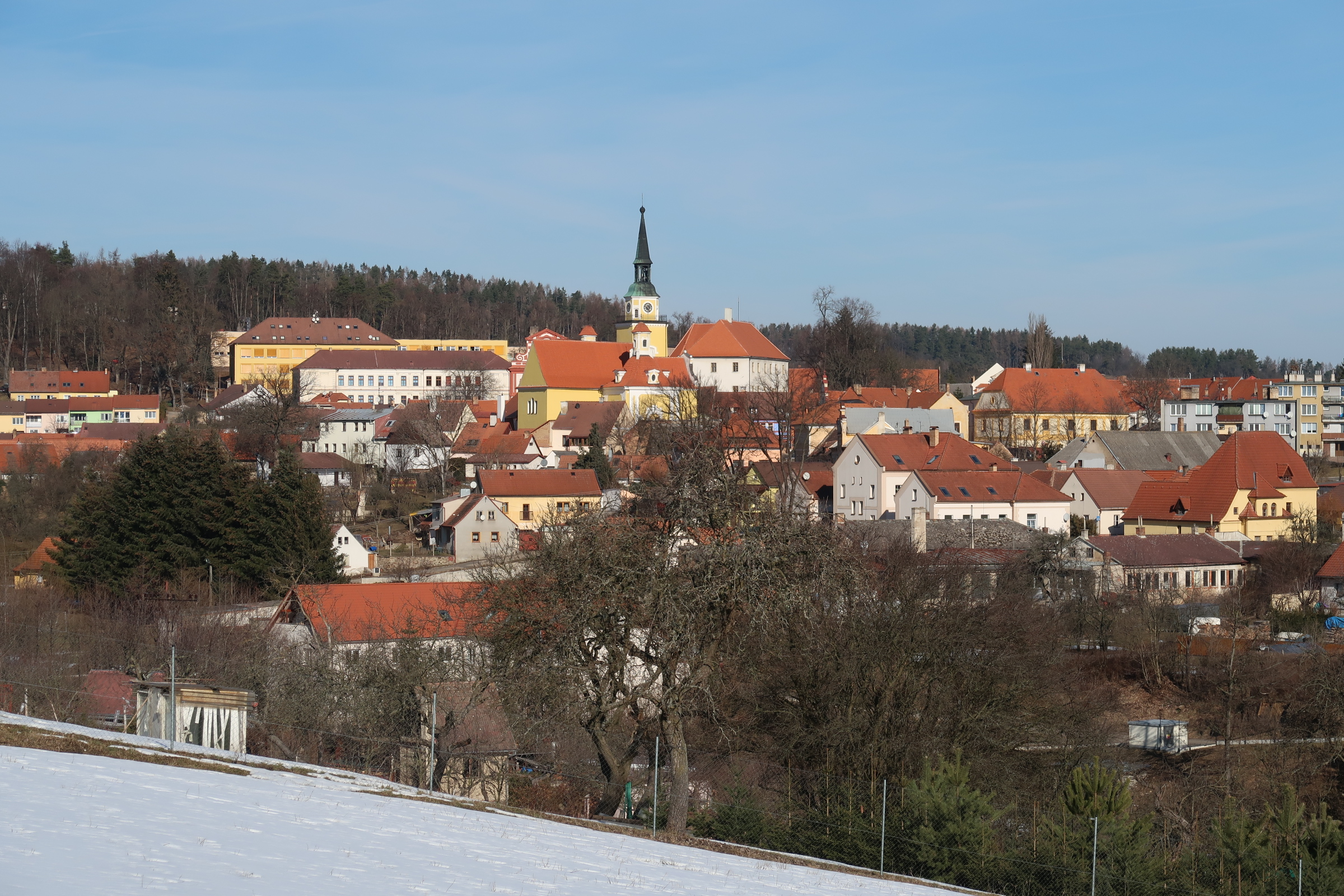
- Vlachovo Březí seen from the southwest

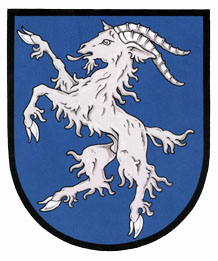
- Coat of arms

- Location in the Czech Republic
- Coordinates: 49°4′53″N 13°57′30″E
- Country: Czech Republic
- Region: South Bohemian
- District: Prachatice
- First mentioned: 1274

Area
  - Total: 19.97 km^{2} (7.71 sq mi)
- Elevation: 525 m (1,722 ft)

Population (2026-01-01)
  - Total: 1,738
  - Density: 87.03/km^{2} (225.4/sq mi)
- Time zone: UTC+1 (CET)
  - Summer (DST): UTC+2 (CEST)
- Postal code: 384 22
- Website: www.vlachovobrezi.cz

Vlachovo Březí (Czech pronunciation: [ˈvlaxovo ˈbr̝ɛziː]; German: Wällisch Birken, Wällischbirken) is a town in Prachatice District in the South Bohemian Region of the Czech Republic. It has about 1,700 inhabitants. The town is located on the stream Libotyňský potok in the Bohemian Forest Foothills.

Vlachovo Březí was founded in the 13th century at the latest and became a town in 1868. The historic town centre is well preserved and is protected as an urban monument zone. The main landmarks of the town are the Church of the Annunciation and the Vlachovo Březí Castle.

== Administrative division ==
Vlachovo Březí consists of eight municipal parts (in brackets population according to the 2021 census):

- Vlachovo Březí (1,553)
- Chocholatá Lhota (22)
- Dachov (23)
- Dolní Kožlí (31)
- Doubrava (3)
- Horní Kožlí (20)
- Mojkov (19)
- Uhřice (37)

== Etymology ==
The name Březí is derived from the Czech word bříza (i.e. 'birch') and referred to the forest that was around the settlement. The suffix Vlachovo (meaning Vlach's) refers to Knight Vladislav Vlach Malovec, who owned the settlement.

== Geography ==
Vlachovo Březí is located about 7 kilometres (4 mi) north of Prachatice and 38 km (24 mi) northwest of České Budějovice. It lies in the Bohemian Forest Foothills. The highest point is the hill Běleč at 923 m (3,028 ft) above sea level. The stream Libotyňský potok flows through the town. The stream and its nameless tributary supply a system of fishponds around the town.

== History ==
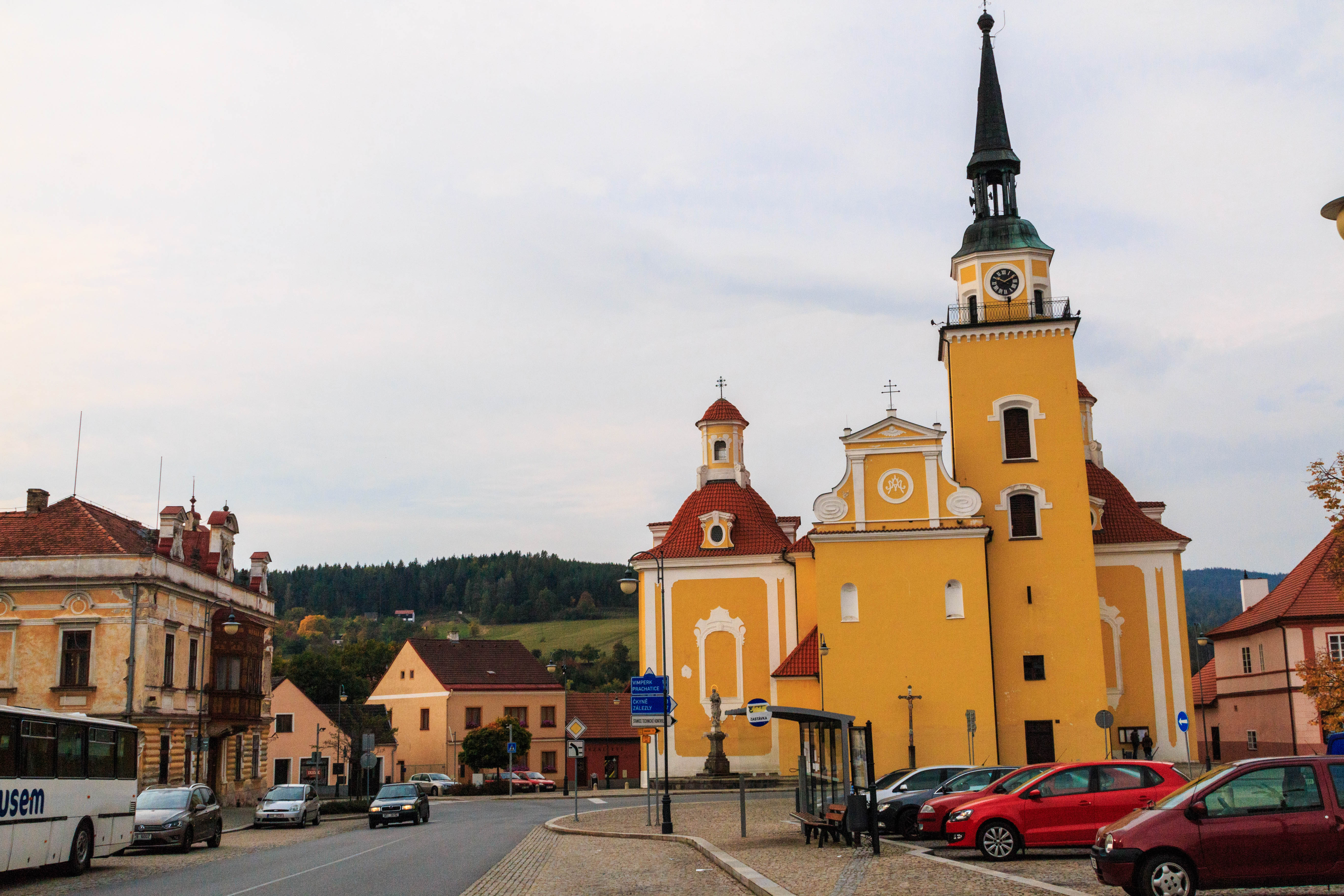
Town square with the Church of the Annunciation

The first written mention of Vlachovo Březí is from 1274, then called just Březí. In the first half of the 15th century, Březí was owned by the Malovec family and was renamed Vlachovo Březí after Vladislav Vlach Malovec. In 1538, the settlement was promoted to a market town by Emperor Ferdinand I and received its coat of arms. From the second half of the 17th century, the cloth making flourished, and local products were also exported abroad. Prosperity started population growth. In 1868, Vlachovo Březí was promoted to a town by Emperor Franz Joseph I.

== Demographics ==
Historical population

Year	Pop.	±%
1869	3,157	—
1880	3,124	−1.0%
1890	2,826	−9.5%
1900	2,660	−5.9%
1910	2,658	−0.1%

Year	Pop.	±%
1921	2,575	−3.1%
1930	2,364	−8.2%
1950	1,661	−29.7%
1961	1,701	+2.4%
1970	1,616	−5.0%

Year	Pop.	±%
1980	1,574	−2.6%
1991	1,629	+3.5%
2001	1,668	+2.4%
2011	1,651	−1.0%
2021	1,708	+3.5%

Source: Censuses

== Transport ==
There are no railways or major roads passing through the municipal territory.

== Sights ==
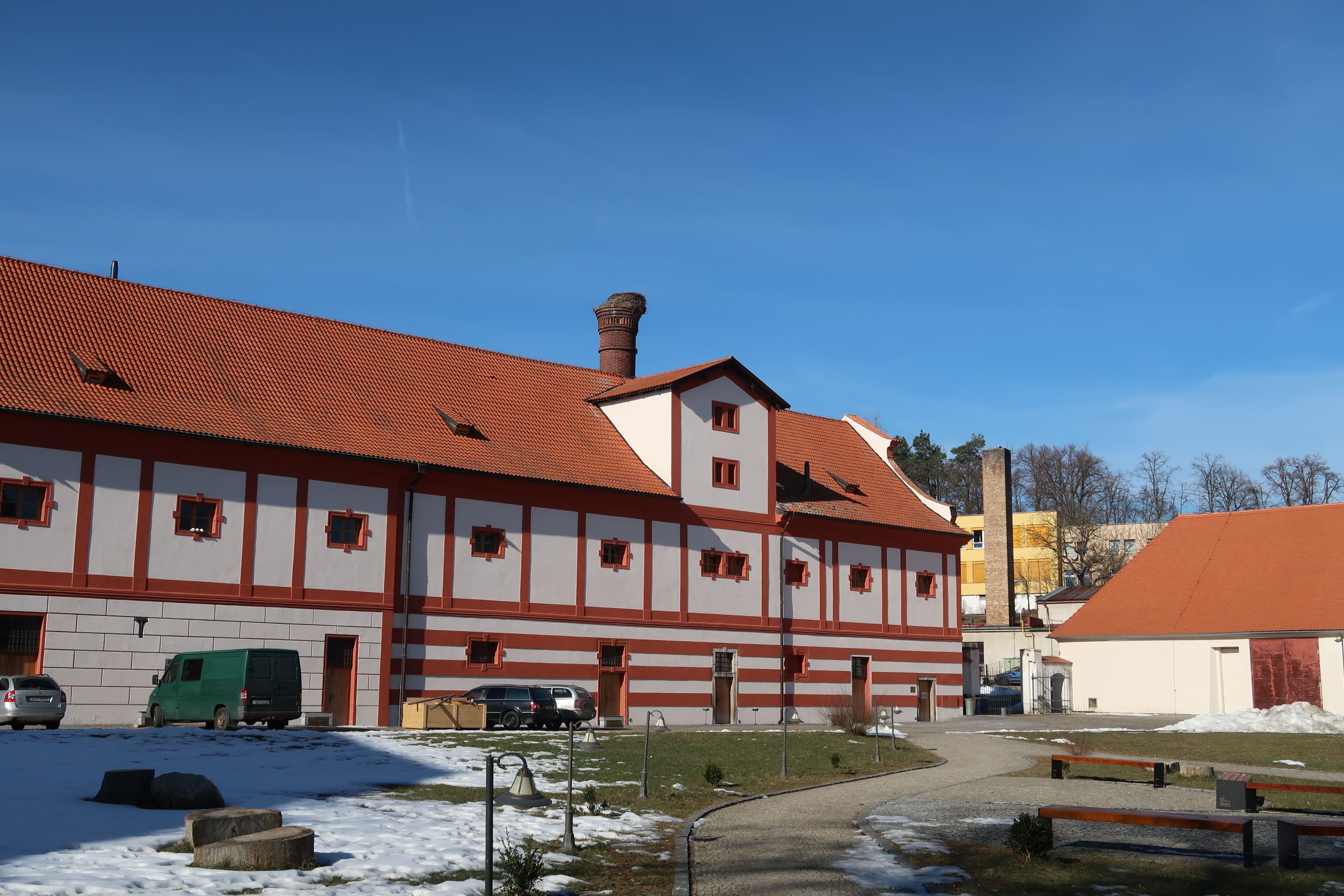
The Manor Brewery building with the castle courtyard

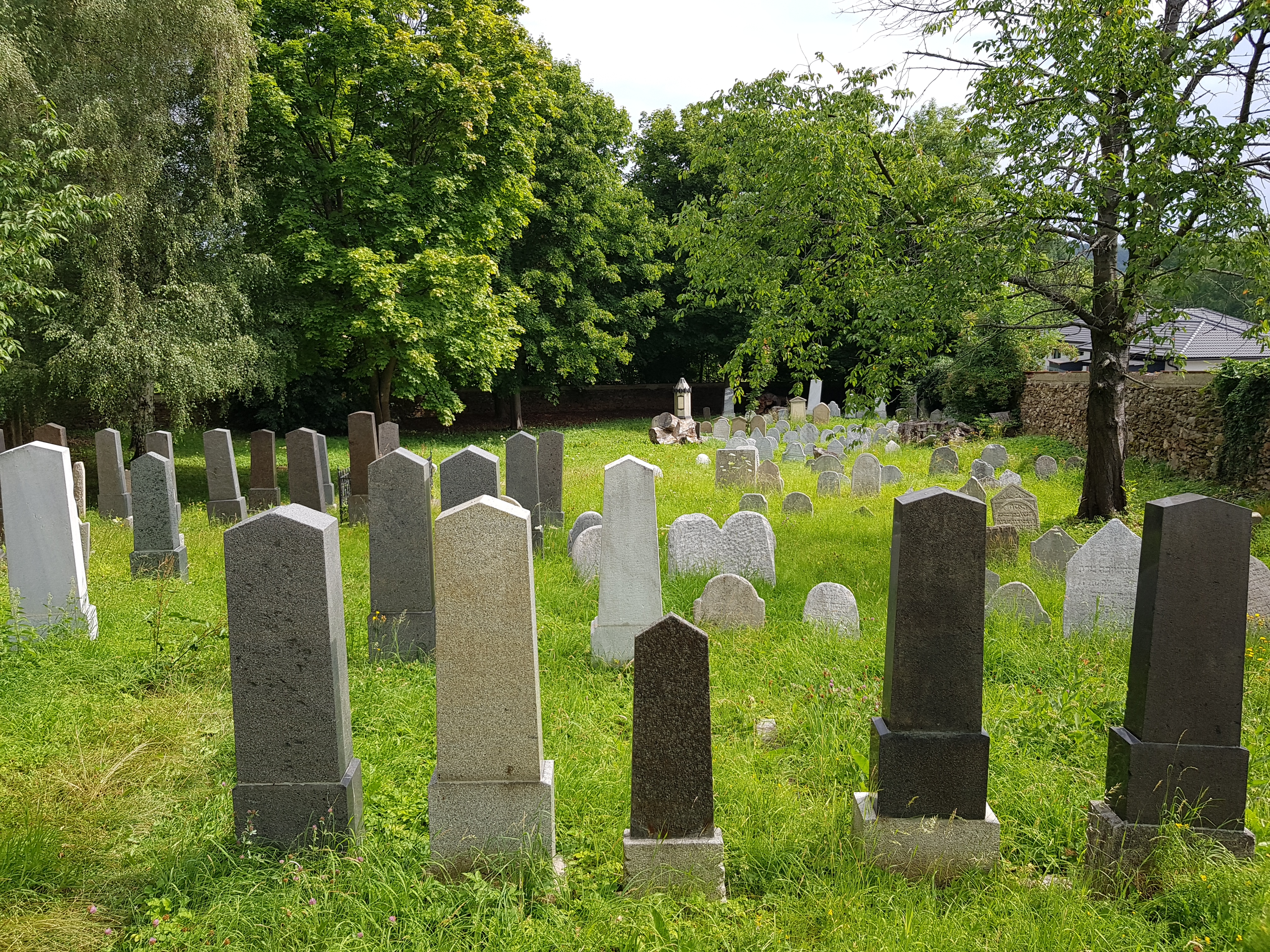
Jewish cemetery

Vlachovo Březí Castle was originally a medieval fortress, rebuilt into a Renaissance castle in 1561. In 1698, it was rebuilt into its current early Baroque form. Today it is unused and the premises are offered for rent.

The first mention of a brewery in Vlachovo Březí is from 1623. The Manor Brewery in its current form was founded around 1670 and its capacity caused the gradual demise of breweries in the surrounding villages. The Baroque brewery building with distinctive gables was built in the 18th century and forms the western wing of the castle complex. The beer brewing continued until 1924. In 2014–2015, the valuable building was repaired and now it is owned by the town. The beer brewing was renewed in 2017.

The original Church of the Annunciation was first mentioned in 1359, when it was built in the Romanesque style. In 1659–1669, the church was completely rebuilt in the Baroque style, in which form it still stands today. The side chapel was added in 1735 and the tower was modified to its present form in 1865. The chancel, estimated to have been built in the 13th century, has been preserved from the original church.

The Chapel of the Holy Spirit is located on a hill above the town. It is an octagonal Baroque building. It was built in the 18th century on the site of an older chapel from 1661. The path to the chapel is lined with Stations of the Cross.

The presence of the Jewish community is commemorated by a well-preserved Jewish cemetery. First mentioned in 1692, it was probably founded in the mid-17th century and was extended several times in the 18th and 19th centuries. There are about 200 preserved tombstones and the oldest readable tombstone dates from 1729.

== Notable people ==
- Joseph Drechsler (1782–1852), Austrian organist and composer
- Jakub Bursa (1813–1884), architect; died here
- Karel Traxler (1866–1936), chess master
- Jan Matulka (1890–1972), Czech-American modern artist

== Twin towns – sister cities ==
Vlachovo Březí is twinned with:

- Sankt Oswald-Riedlhütte, Germany
