= Turie Pole =

- Village
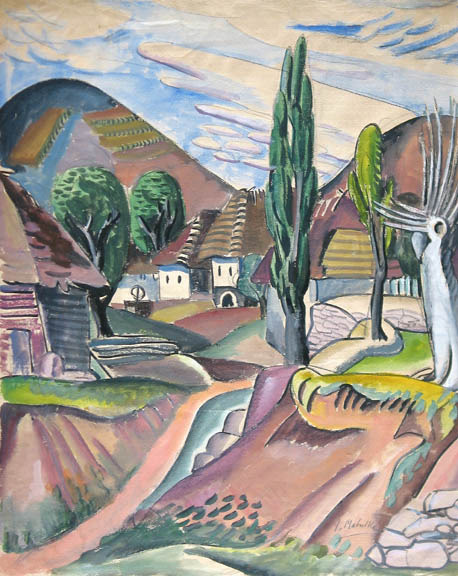
- Jan Matulka - Tŭri Pôle Landscape (c1921)

- Former location of Turie Pole in Slovakia
- Coordinates: 48°24′N 19°20′E
- Country: Slovakia
- Region: Banská Bystrica Region
- District: Zvolen
- Time zone: UTC+1
  - Summer (DST): UTC+2

Turie Pole (Hungarian: Túrmező) was a village of the Zvolen District in the modern-day Banská Bystrica Region of Slovakia. It was founded in 1337. In 1951, the people of Tŭri Pôle were forcibly displaced as part of the establishment of the Lešť unincorporated area, which has since then served as a military training area.

Painter Jan Matulka often visited and made many paintings of the landscape and scenery. One of the paintings records the name of the village under the intentional stylistic variation Tŭri Pôle.
