= Bušanovice =

- Municipality
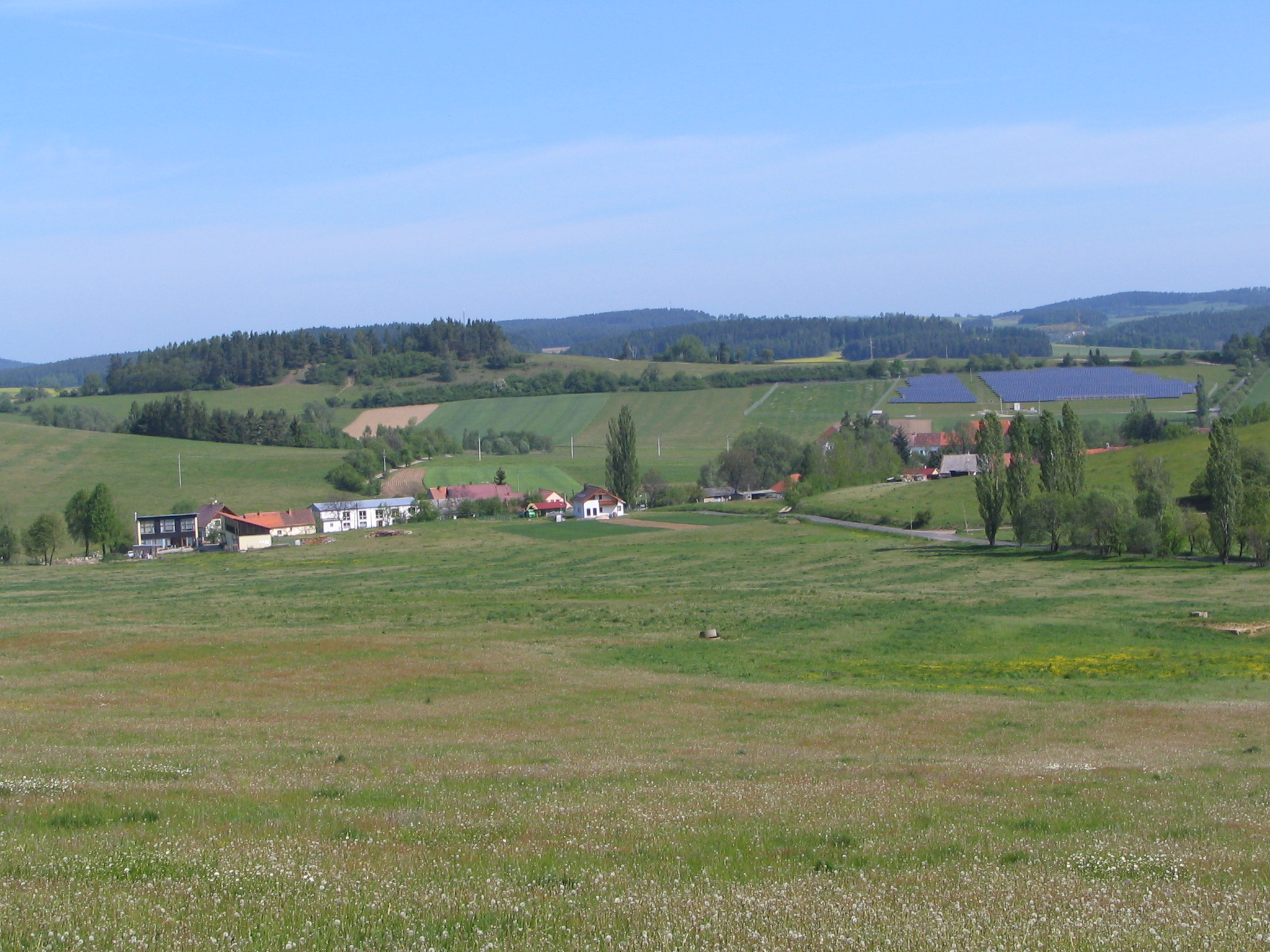
- View from the south

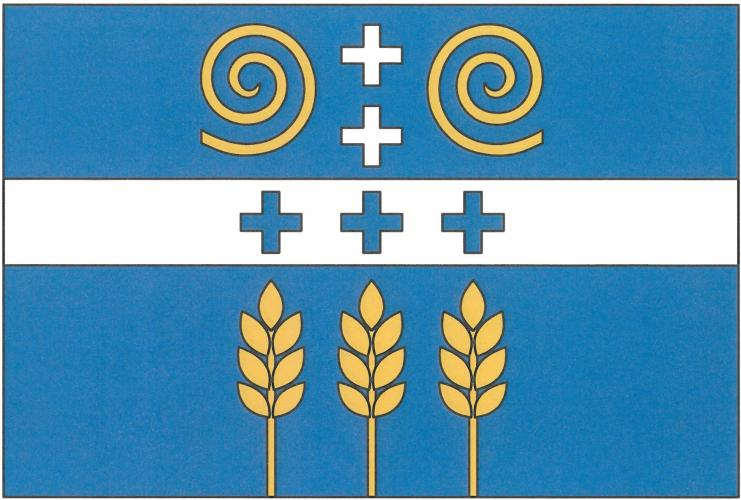
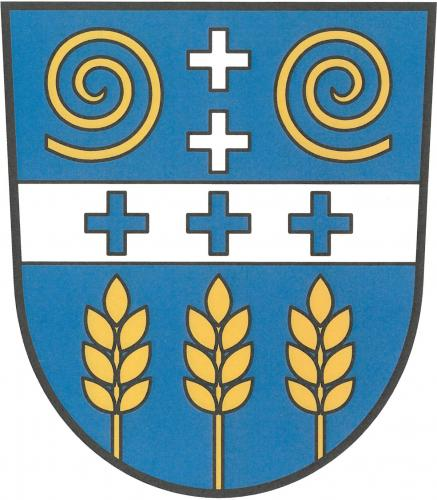
- Flag Coat of arms

- Location in the Czech Republic
- Coordinates: 49°6′56″N 13°56′5″E
- Country: Czech Republic
- Region: South Bohemian
- District: Prachatice
- First mentioned: 1314

Area
  - Total: 9.73 km^{2} (3.76 sq mi)
- Elevation: 540 m (1,770 ft)

Population (2026-01-01)
  - Total: 267
  - Density: 27.4/km^{2} (71.1/sq mi)
- Time zone: UTC+1 (CET)
  - Summer (DST): UTC+2 (CEST)
- Postal code: 384 22
- Website: www.busanovice.cz

Bušanovice is a municipality and village in Prachatice District in the South Bohemian Region of the Czech Republic. It has about 300 inhabitants.

== Administrative division ==
Bušanovice consists of five municipal parts (in brackets population according to the 2021 census):

- Bušanovice (86)
- Beneda (13)
- Dolní Nakvasovice (73)
- Horní Nakvasovice (47)
- Želibořice (41)

== Etymology ==
The name Bušanovice is derived from the surname Bušan, meaning "the village of Bušan's people".

== Geography ==
Bušanovice is located about 12 kilometres (7 mi) north of Prachatice and 42 km (26 mi) northwest of České Budějovice. It lies in the Bohemian Forest Foothills. The highest point is the hill Uhřice at 822 m (2,697 ft) above sea level.

== History ==
The first written mention of Bušanovice is from 1314. It was founded as one of the old free royal settlements in the area. In 1490 it was first listed as part of the Hluboká estate. In 1552, it was acquired by William of Rosenberg.

== Demographics ==
Historical population

Year	Pop.	±%
1869	580	—
1880	644	+11.0%
1890	642	−0.3%
1900	636	−0.9%
1910	693	+9.0%

Year	Pop.	±%
1921	655	−5.5%
1930	611	−6.7%
1950	457	−25.2%
1961	387	−15.3%
1970	306	−20.9%

Year	Pop.	±%
1980	265	−13.4%
1991	246	−7.2%
2001	259	+5.3%
2011	222	−14.3%
2021	260	+17.1%

Source: Censuses

== Transport ==
There are no railways or major roads passing through the municipality.

== Sights ==
The main landmark of Bušanovice is the Chapel of the Virgin Mary from the second half of the 18th century.

== Notable people ==
- Jakub Bursa (1813–1884), architect
