= Jakub Bursa =

Czech architect, folk artist and builder (1813–1884)

Jakub Bursa (21 July 1813 in Dolní Nekvasovice – 19 August 1884 in Vlachovo Březí) was a Czech architect, folk artist and builder of Bohemian Rustic Baroque architecture. He decorated many gables of houses in Southern Bohemia in the style of the so-called rural South Bohemian Baroque. The last known date of his work is 1861; details of the last 23 years of his life are unknown.

== Bibliography ==
- Fibich, Ondřej; Hájek, Pavel; Müller, Jan; Řandová, Ivana; Skalický, Karel; Štorková, Jana (2015). Jakub Bursa a jihočeská venkovská architektura [Jakub Bursa and South Bohemian Rural Architecture] (in Czech). České Budějovice: National Heritage Institute. ISBN 978-80-85033-59-5.
