= Carl Holty =

German-American painter

- Holty with one of his paintings, ca. 1950, unidentified photographer. Carl Holty papers, Archives of American Art, Smithsonian Institution
- Born: Carl Robert Holty; June 21, 1900; Freiburg, Germany
- Died: March 22, 1973 (aged 72); New York, New York, United States
- Known for: Painting
- Movement: Abstract
- Awards: 2010 Wisconsin Visual Art Lifetime Achievement Award

Carl Robert Holty (1900–1973) was a German-born American abstract painter. Raised in Wisconsin, he was the first major abstract painter to gain notoriety from the state. Harold Rosenberg described Holty as "a figure of our art history," known for his use of color, shape and form.

== Personal life and education ==
Carl Holty was born in 1900 in Freiburg, Germany. His parents, Americans, lived in Freiburg while his father, a doctor, studied specialty medicine since 1899. His father was German, gaining citizenship in the United States in 1906. Shortly after his birth, the family moved back to Milwaukee, Wisconsin, where they lived in the German district with his grandparents. The Holty family then moved to the countryside near Green Bay where his father practiced medicine, before returning to Milwaukee around 1906. Holty's grandfather introduced him to art by taking him to visit local art galleries. Around the age of twelve, Holty began taking lessons with a local German painter. As a teenager, he started drawing cartoons and became interested in poster art. He attended University School of Milwaukee, graduating high school within two and a half years. Holty attended Marquette University as a pre-med student. Eventually he decided to attend art school. That summer he enrolled at the Art Institute of Chicago, eventually attending classes at the Parsons School of Design. He returned to Milwaukee in 1923 and opened a portrait painting studio.

In 1925 Holty married and honeymooned in Europe, living there for the next ten years, first in Munich and then Switzerland. In Switzerland Mrs. Holty sought treatment for her tuberculosis, dying in 1930. He moved to Paris that year, before returning to the United States in 1935 and living in New York City. In New York he remarried Elizabeth and they had a daughter Antonia. He taught at Brooklyn College from 1950 until 1970. During that time he also was a visiting instructor at the Art Students League, Washington University in St. Louis, and University of Louisville. Upon his retirement from Brooklyn College he was awarded the title of professor emeritus. Holty died on March 22, 1973, in New York City.

== Artistic career ==
Bread and Fruit, oil on Masonite painting by Carl Holty, 1948, private collection

In 1926, while living in Munich, Holty originally planned to attend the Royal Academy, only to train under Hans Hofmann. Hofmann's ideas about space, color, and shape would transform Holty's work, with Holty's work becoming more abstract as time went on.

"No one had ever talked to me about conceptual drawing, about knowing what I'm looking at from the point of view of my tactile knowledge as well as my visual knowledge. Hofmann did. And the world opened up just like that."
- Carl Holty on Hans Hofmann's influence

From 1930 to 1935 he lived in Paris, exhibiting his work to good reception. There he met Robert Delaunay and joined Delaunay's group Abstration-Création as their second American member. His work was published in the group's magazine and became associated with Cubism and Neo-Plasticism. His Paris works have been compared to the paintings of Juan Gris and Pablo Picasso's Synthetic Cubism.

Upon returning to the United States, he found artist representation in New York City and became involved, once again, with Hans Hofmann and Vaclav Vytlacil as well as Stuart Davis, whom he had known in Paris. Vytlacil invited Holty to participate in discussions which led to the formation of the American Abstract Artists, which Holty would eventually come to chair, retaining his membership until 1944. During this time, he moved away from Cubism and started to experiment with Biomorphism. In the 1930s he used tape to give strong edges to forms, also reworking and overpainting sections, as seen in his work Gridiron (1943–1944). Between 1945 and 1948 he was represented by the Samuel M. Kootz Gallery. He continued to explore shapes and form, and by the 1960s contours had disappeared from his work, being replaced with subtle toned-down colors.

Holty served as artist in residence at the University of Georgia, University of Florida, University of California at Berkeley, University of Wisconsin and the Corcoran School of Art. He also wrote a book, with Romare Bearden, titled The Painter's Mind, published in 1969.

=== Legacy and reception ===
Untitled, oil on Masonite painting by Carl Holty, c.1942, private collection

In 1977 the Carl Holty Papers were donated to the Archives of American Art by Charles Byrne. On his role as a Wisconsin artist, Andrew Stevens stated in 1995 that "Holty's zeal for non-objective art was more closely identified with the younger group of American painters in the East. His artworks including his prints are among the first by a Wisconsin artist to come to grips with the tide of abstract art that spread from Europe to America at the beginning of the 20th century."

== Selected works ==
- Gridiron, 1943–1944; Smithsonian American Art Museum
- Untitled, 1939; Amon Carter Museum
- Untitled, 1950; Kemper Art Museum
- Untitled, series, 1951; Brooklyn Museum

== Notable exhibitions ==
- Carl Holty: The World Seen and Sensed, 1980–81; Milwaukee Art Museum
- Annual Exhibition of Contemporary Painting, 1945; Whitney Museum of American Art
- American Painting Today, 1950; Metropolitan Museum of Art
- Abstract Painting and Sculpture in America, 1951; Museum of Modern Art
- Contemporary American Painting and Sculpture, 1963; Krannert Art Museum
