= Podmokly (Klatovy District) =

- Municipality
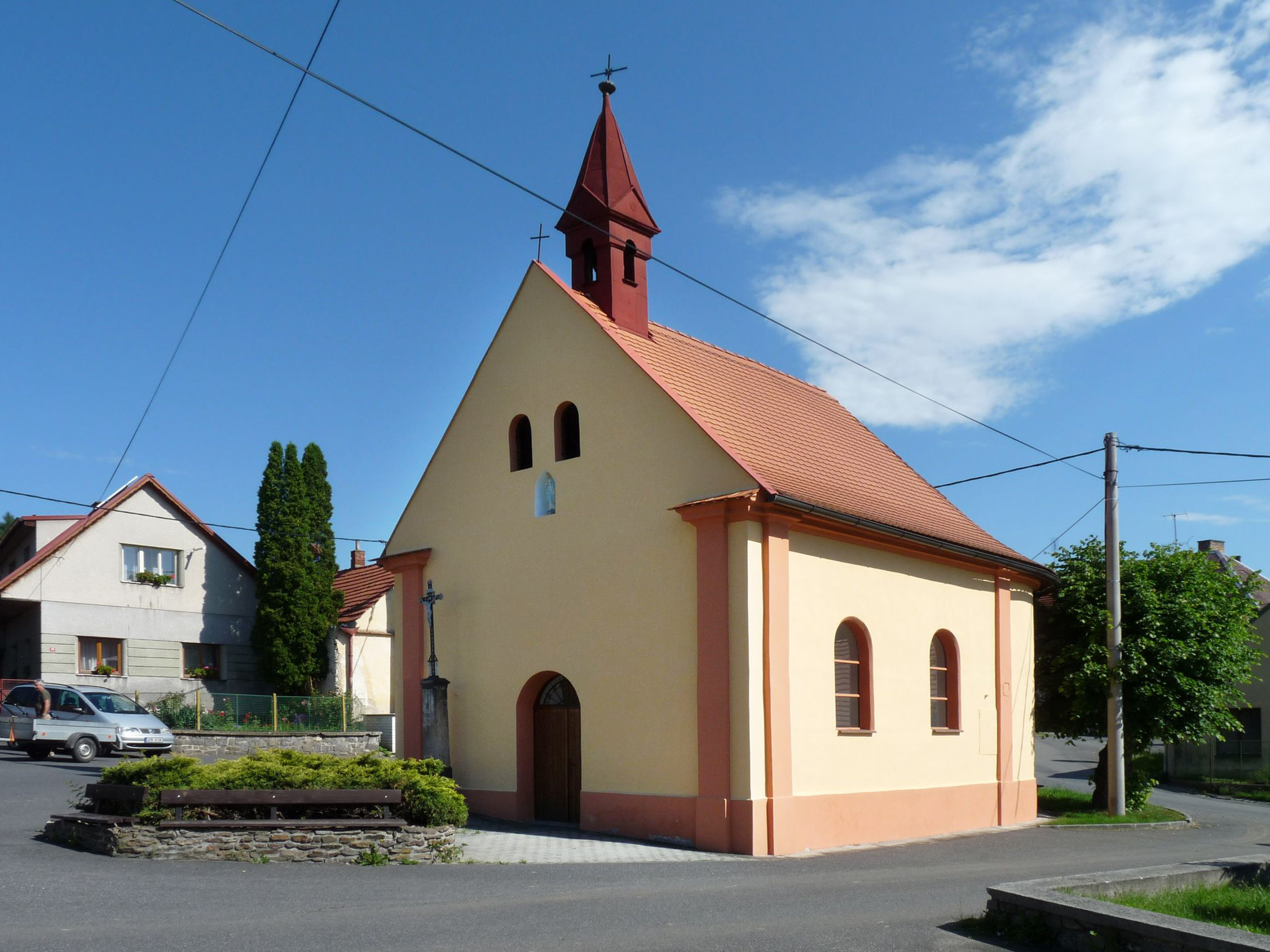
- Chapel in the centre of Podmokly

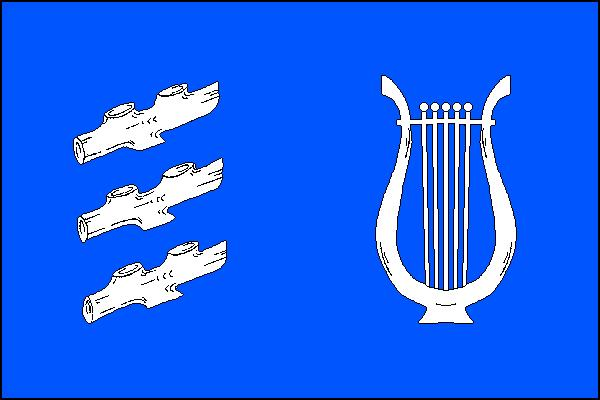
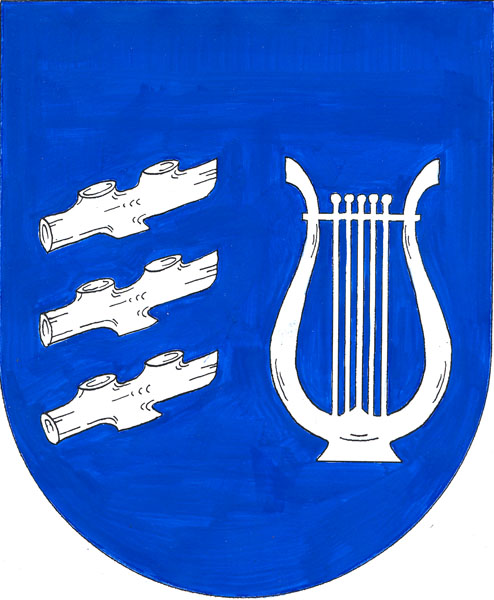
- Flag Coat of arms

- Location in the Czech Republic
- Coordinates: 49°13′49″N 13°34′41″E
- Country: Czech Republic
- Region: Plzeň
- District: Klatovy
- First mentioned: 1045

Area
  - Total: 5.27 km^{2} (2.03 sq mi)
- Elevation: 505 m (1,657 ft)

Population (2026-01-01)
  - Total: 153
  - Density: 29.0/km^{2} (75.2/sq mi)
- Time zone: UTC+1 (CET)
  - Summer (DST): UTC+2 (CEST)
- Postal code: 342 01
- Website: www.podmokly.cz

Podmokly is a municipality and village in Klatovy District in the Plzeň Region of the Czech Republic. It has about 200 inhabitants.

== Etymology ==
The name is derived from the old Czech word podmoklý (i.e. 'waterlogged'), meaning 'a settlement of people living in waterlogged houses'.

== Geography ==
Podmokly is located about 27 kilometres (17 mi) southeast of Klatovy and 57 km (35 mi) south of Plzeň. It lies in the Bohemian Forest Foothills. The highest point is at 647 m (2,123 ft) above sea level. The stream Podmokelský potok flows through the town.

== History ==
The first written mention of Podmokly is from 1045, when Duke Bretislav I donated the village to the Břevnov Monastery. Until the end of the 19th century, Podmokly had a large Jewish community.

== Demographics ==
Historical population

Year	Pop.	±%
1869	432	—
1880	390	−9.7%
1890	381	−2.3%
1900	377	−1.0%
1910	372	−1.3%

Year	Pop.	±%
1921	403	+8.3%
1930	378	−6.2%
1950	274	−27.5%
1961	277	+1.1%
1970	228	−17.7%

Year	Pop.	±%
1980	191	−16.2%
1991	179	−6.3%
2001	180	+0.6%
2011	169	−6.1%
2021	126	−25.4%

Source: Censuses

== Transport ==
There are no railways or major roads passing through the municipality.

== Sights ==
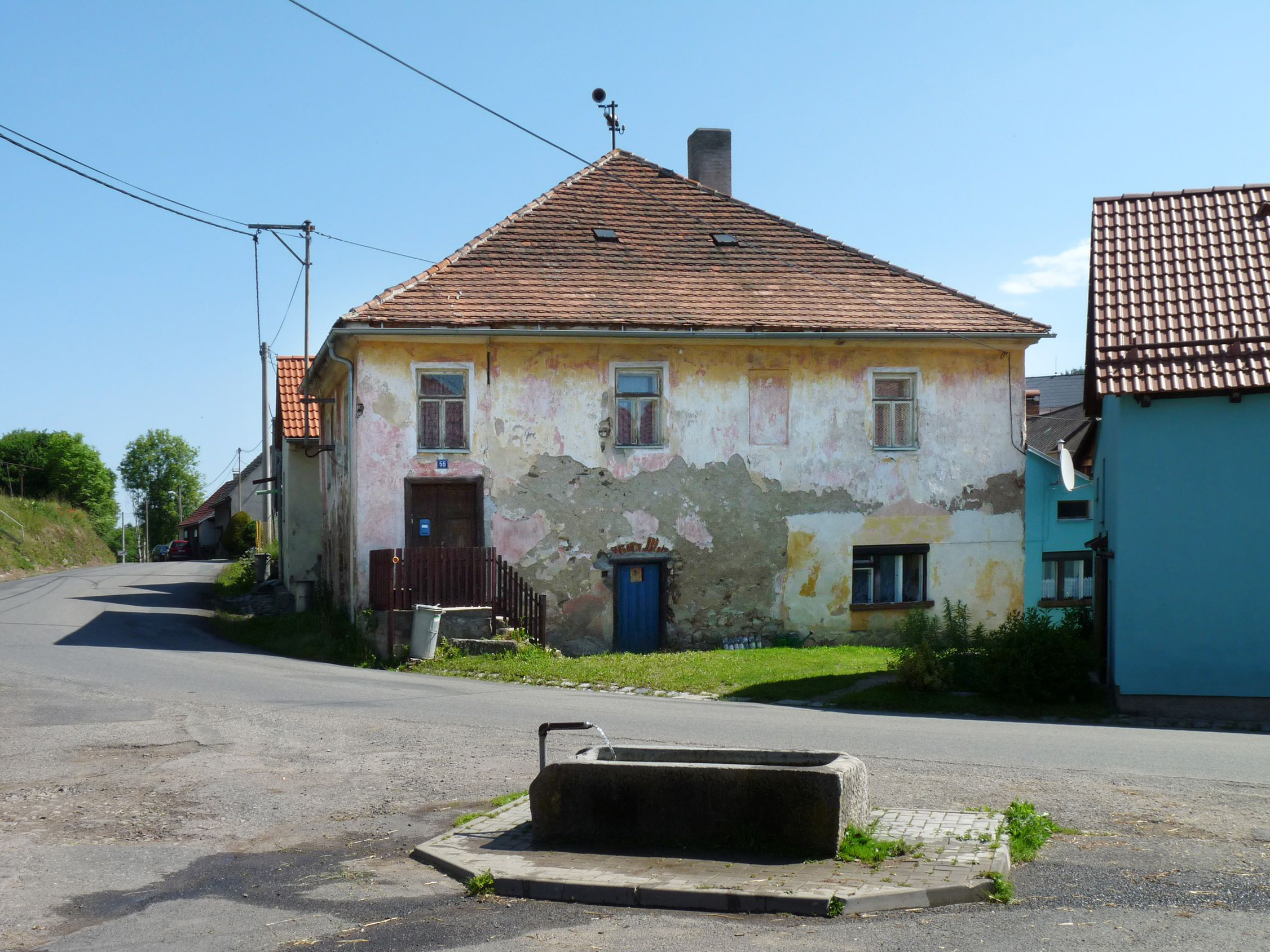
Former synagogue

The only protected cultural monument in the municipality is the former synagogue. It is a small rural synagogue rebuilt into its current form after a fire in the second half of the 19th century. It has partially preserved original interiors. In the western part of the municipality, outside the built-up area, there is a Jewish cemetery.

The main landmark of Podmokly is a Baroque chapel from the 18th century.
