= Burgoyne Diller =

American abstract painter (1906–1965)

- Born: January 13, 1906; New York City, US
- Died: January 30, 1965 (aged 59); New York City, US
- Known for: Painting
- Movement: Abstract art

Burgoyne A. Diller (January 13, 1906 – January 30, 1965) was an American abstract painter. Many of his best-known works are characterized by orthogonal geometric forms that reflect his strong interest in the De Stijl movement and the work of Piet Mondrian in particular. Overall, his Geometric abstraction and non-objective style also owe much to his study with Hans Hofmann at the Art Students League of New York. He was a founding member of the American Abstract Artists. Diller's abstract work has sometimes been termed "constructivist". He also did figurative and representational works early in his career working as a muralist for the New York City Federal Arts Project.

== Life ==
Diller was born in The Bronx, New York in 1906 to Andrew Diller, a violinist and conductor, and Mary Burgoyne. His father died in 1908, while Diller was just three years old. His mother would then marry an engineer named Adrian Adney. In 1919 he and his new family moved to Battle Creek, Michigan. When he was a child, he once had an illness that caused him to miss a year of school. During this period, he began to draw. This was his first exposure to the world of art and he exhibited a natural talent for it. Diller attended Battle Creek High School and Michigan State University. He graduated from Michigan State University in 1927 and moved to Buffalo, New York, where he lived with his maternal grandfather.

In Buffalo, Diller worked many odd jobs before landing a steady position as a janitor. At this time, he began to sell a few of his artworks and eventually this income allowed him to move to New York City where he began studying at the Art Students League in 1929. He enjoyed success and recognition at the League and was awarded a scholarship job at the school's bookstore. Diller ended up leaving the Art Students League in 1933 and took up a position with the Works Progress Administration (WPA). However, in 1941 Diller, along with other WPA supervisors, was suspended from the WPA due to an alleged Communist infiltration of the WPA. After an investigation, no evidence was found to incriminate Diller and he was soon reinstated. In 1943 Diller enlisted in the U.S. Navy and was assigned to the Training Aids Development Center. There he invented a hand-held Morse code training device that led to three million of the devices being created. He was awarded a patent for the invention in 1945. He was released from active duty after World War II in November 1945 as a lieutenant (junior grade) and remained in the naval reserve until 1954, retiring with the rank of lieutenant. During his time in active duty, he stopped creating art altogether. However, once the war ended, he took up art once again. In 1946 Diller was hired as an assistant professor at Brooklyn College and was soon promoted to a full-time position. He was granted tenure at the college in 1949. He remained on the faculty until his death in 1965.

In 1930 Diller married Sarah "Sally" Bernadette Conboy, who worked in the classified department of The New York Times. "Her steady income helped the couple maintain a modest lifestyle throughout the Depression." By the early 1950s, Diller began creating art at a very inconsistent rate due to "mounting personal problems, excessive alcohol consumption, and a sense of rejection by an art world dominated by Abstract Expressionists." In 1959, Diller's studio flooded and none of the artwork he had stored in his basement could be salvaged. Contributing to the problems in his life was Sally's own alcoholism which led to her death in 1954 of cirrhosis of the liver, just months after she had retired from The New York Times. They never had any children. That same summer, while visiting his mother and stepfather in Michigan, Diller met Grace Kelso LaCrone who had just separated from her husband. Once her divorce was finalized, she and Diller married in 1955. They too never had any children together. In his later years, Diller moved to Atlantic Highlands, New Jersey, where his home and studio were both near the shore. By 1965 Diller's health had seriously declined after years of smoking and alcohol abuse. He died that very year at the age of 59 due to complications of heart disease and pulmonary edema while at the French Hospital in Manhattan.

== Style ==
"A pioneer of American modernism, Burgoyne Diller devoted his career to the exploration of geometric abstraction in paintings, drawings, collages, and sculptures."

"For Diller, abstraction was the ideal realm of harmony, stability and order in which every form and spatial interval could be controlled and measured." "His style began with forms of modernism, including cubism, Kandinsky's abstraction, constructivism, and other European models." "He simplified his palette to the bold colors and black and white of neoplasticism and reduced his visual vocabulary to squares and rectangles." "Diller developed a highly personal language based on three major compositional themes. These themes, which he labeled “First,” “Second,” and “Third,” explored the picture plane in relation to forms in movement and forms in constant opposition." "By 1934 Diller had likely become the earliest American exponent of Mondrian's type of geometrical abstraction." "In the early 1940s, he began creating wall-mounted wood constructions, and during the 1950s and 1960s his sculptures developed into the large-scale, free-standing, formica works for which he is well known."

The Sullivan Goss Art Gallery notes the following about Diller's style: "Composed predominantly of squares and rectangles and accented with primary colors against a solid white background, Diller's mature abstract paintings are the result of his explorations of pure color and form. Diller's austere work recalls the stinging isolation of the lives of all Americans of the Depression era, and possibly his own. However, the well-planned geometric nature of his paintings reveals his desire for a reconstructed world prevailing over the seemingly hopeless situation in the United States during the Depression."

== Projects ==
In 1934, Diller served as Supervisor for Mural Painting for the Temporary Emergency Relief Administration (TERA). The following year TERA was replaced by the Federal Art Project (FAP) but Diller kept his position as supervisor. He held this position until 1940. During his tenure at the WPA, "Diller championed abstract art and oversaw the execution of more than 200 public murals, most of which were completed as part of this large undertaking". "In the late 1930s, he supervised the artwork for the Williamsburg Housing Project in Brooklyn, New York (1937-1939). Among the principal artists Diller selected for this project were Jan Matulka, Stuart Davis, and Paul Kelpe, who were all permitted to execute their own designs." Other artists who had the support of Diller for projects as part of the Federal Art Project were Arshile Gorky, Ilya Bolotowsky, Jackson Pollock, and Willem de Kooning. Some of the major abstract murals supervised by Diller during this time include those at the Newark Airport by Gorky and the Williamsburg Housing Project by Bolotowsky. "With the entry of the United States into World War II, areas of the WPA were transferred to the War Service division, and from 1941 until 1943, Diller directed the New York City War Service Art Project."

Another major project involving Diller was the formation of the American Abstract Artists in 1937. This group was devoted to the support and propagation of abstract art in the United States. However, Diller's administrative duties to the Federal Art Project kept him from being an active member of the group and in 1940, he dropped out. He would eventually rejoin in 1947.

== Views ==
On the subject of art itself, Diller has said that he "always had the feeling that art really develops through a kind of general activity. You can have your isolated geniuses, but it's always been somehow or other a product of a kind of ferment."

Diller felt that artists, as a whole, were greatly under-appreciated in American society. He understood the struggles of being an artist in the early 20th century. In an interview with Harlan Phillips, Diller noted "one thing that certainly characterized [art during his lifetime] was lack of work, lack of money just to get the necessities of life. I mean, you learned to eat practically nothing so you could buy a tube of paint, and so on and so forth. You had a little part time job, or you'd pick up all sorts of crazy things in order to exist. It seemed to be true of all the artists."

As an abstract artist himself, Diller was a strong proponent for the form. He felt that compared to other artists, abstract artists struggled the most to gain publicity in the American art world. Diller said "if you happened to be concerned at all about the contemporary movements in art [during his life], which then, of course, were Cubism and so on, why there was absolutely no place to show your work... we had this problem again with abstract painting. Where would you show it? You were terribly fortunate to be shown any place, which is really, you know, the thing that brought the American Abstract Artists into being, so that cooperatively they might be able to finance a place to have a show once a year and that sort of thing. It was a very necessary thing."

== Influences ==
Diller found inspiration in the work of Russian Constructivist Kazimir Malevich and in the work of the De Stijl artists Piet Mondrian and Theo van Doesburg. Diller also was greatly influenced by his teachers in the Art Students League Hans Hofmann and Jan Matulka. Hofmann, in particular, was so influential in Diller's life that when Diller had his solo exhibition at the Contemporary Arts Museum (Houston) in New York City, he had Hofmann write the introduction for the catalogue.

== Critical reception ==
During Diller's lifetime, abstract art was not very popular. Abstract artists struggled to gain any form of publicity. Diller noted "your so-called big institutions...were supposed to have done so much for the artists, you know, in the past, the Museum of Modern Art, and so on - - I don't think they had a prohibition against showing American abstract painters, but they didn't show them. They showed very, very few of them."

Although Diller had numerous exhibitions before and after World War II, his work attracted very little public attention and it was not until the last few years of his life that he was generally acknowledged as one of the best American abstract artists of his generation.

In a review of the Burgoyne Diller exhibit in the Paula Cooper Gallery in November 2001, art critic Donald Kuspit said the following about Diller's attempt to replicate the stylings of his idol Mondrian: "[Diller] was the first American to take Mondrian as his model. Already in the 1930s he was producing works with a geometric sophistication similar to that of the Dutch artist. But Diller never quite got Mondrian's metaphysical point, nor did his work have Mondrian's restraint, his determination to make less count for more, expressively and cognitively. Diller's abstractions, on the contrary, tend to be overloaded and acrobatic: the more angles and rectangles, the better. Such feats of skill and busyness are beside the point of Mondrian's idealism."

On the topic of Diller's own art, Kuspit said: "What saves the drawings and collages from being historical curiosities, brilliantly academic abstractions, as it were, is the heightening of the contrast between the planes and the eventual reduction of their number. This occurs under the influence not of Mondrian but of Malevich. Again and again we see Diller grandly setting up a central square adumbrated by lesser geometrical entities. The result is often reminiscent of Josef Albers's homages to the square, which in fact were contemporary with Diller's drawings and collages. One wonders who was looking over whose shoulder, or whether they were simply on the same wavelength. Diller's geometry seems more spirited and less redundant than Albers's--more Malevichean. One dark square with various agitated rectangles in it seems to recall Malevich's aerodynamic phase, and one blue square with a white-and-yellow rectangular strip above brings the final puritan, transcendental phase of Supremati to mind. If Diller is more playful than Albers, however, he's more nervous than Malevich. The nervousness shows up in the pencil lines that often appear as gestural background. Sometimes delicate, sometimes urgent, and always somber, they add a note of tentativeness to the work, which somehow saves the geometry from sterility. They give it a lively aura, suggesting that it may be secretly alive, and might even have a personality, at least latently."

== Legacy ==
"Burgoyne Diller's work testifies not only to his versatility as an artist, but also to his unique ability to personalize the international language of Neo-Plasticism and instill his simplified geometric compositions with emotion, spirituality, and a sense of the heroic.” "Diller will always be remembered as one of the most significant artists devoted to geometric abstraction, and a true pioneer of American modernism."

Philip Larson notes that "Diller's work serves as a vital link between American abstraction of the 1930s and minimalism of the 1950s and 1960s epitomized by artists Donald Judd, Ellsworth Kelly and Myron Stout."

After his death, he left behind a significant body of work that includes paintings, drawings, collages, and sculptures. Over the years his work has been exhibited internationally, most notably by the Whitney Museum of American Art in 1990. His work is represented in numerous museum collections including the Art Institute of Chicago, the Solomon R. Guggenheim Museum, the Metropolitan Museum of Art, and the Museum of Modern Art.

== Collections ==
- Hirshhorn Museum and Sculpture Garden (Washington, DC)
- Hyde Collection (Glens Falls, NY)
- Metropolitan Museum of Art (New York)
- National Gallery of Art (Washington, DC)
- Whitney Museum of American Art (New York)

== References and sources ==
=== Sources ===
- Barbara Haskell; Burgoyne Diller; Whitney Museum of American Art. Burgoyne Diller (New York : Whitney Museum of American Art, 1990) ISBN 0-87427-071-5; ISBN 978-0-87427-071-6
- Walker Art Center; Dallas Museum of Fine Arts; Pasadena Art Museum. Burgoyne Diller, an American constructivist: paintings, sculptures, drawings. Exhibition, Walker Art Center, 12 Dec. 1971 - 16 Jan. 1972; Dallas Museum of Fine Arts, 16 Feb. - 26 Mar. 1972; Pasadena Art Museum, 9 May - 2 July 1972. (Minneapolis, 1971) OCLC 38719365
