= Dorothy Dehner =

American painter and sculptor (1901–1994)

- Born: 23 December 1901; Cleveland, Ohio, US
- Died: 22 September 1994 (aged 92); New York City, US
- Education: Skidmore College, Art Students League, Atelier 17
- Known for: sculpture, painting, drawing
- Notable work: Life on the Farm; Star Cage; Gateway
- Movement: Abstract Expressionism

Dorothy Dehner (1901–1994) was an American painter and sculptor.

== Early life ==
Dorothy Dehner was born on December 23, 1901, in Cleveland, Ohio. Her father was a pharmacist and her mother was a passionate suffragette. When Dehner was ten years old, her father died and her two aunts, Flo and Cora, moved in. Cora aroused Dehner's curiosity about foreign culture with extravagant tales of her travels abroad. Cora's tales would later provide the inspiration for Dehner's solo trip to Europe in 1925.

In 1915, as a result of her mother's declining health, the family of four moved to Pasadena, California, where Dehner actively studied theater at the Pasadena Playhouse. Dehner experienced heavy emotional loss over the next two years in which both her sister and mother died. In 1918, she moved to California to pursue her acting career and attended classes at the Pasadena Playhouse. In 1922, she pursued studies in theater at the University of California Los Angeles, but dropped out after one year to explore a stage career in New York. While in New York, she studied at the American Academy of Dramatic Arts and starred in some off-Broadway productions. Despite her moderate success as an actress, Dehner felt her expression was stifled by the theater. She was, to an extent, dictated by director, script, and venue.

=== Europe 1925 ===
Following her brief stint with theater, Dehner decided to adventure to Paris to seek new inspiration. She traveled alone as not to be hindered by any travel companions. Her first stop was Florence, Italy, where she absorbed much of Italy's historic architecture. Following a quick stop in Switzerland, she flew to Paris where she was heavily influenced by Cubism, Fauvism, and Constructivism. She was particularly taken with works by Picasso and committed herself to drawing throughout her year of travel. The 1925 Art Deco show in Paris particularly overwhelmed her. Upon her return to the United States, Dehner enrolled at the Art Students League and briefly studied sculpture. However, she found the teaching methods overly conventional and ended up setting sculpture aside and focusing on drawing, under the instruction of Jan Matulka, Kenneth Hayes Miller, John Graham and Kimon Nicolaides. It was here she met David Smith.

== Life on the farm ==
Dehner married Smith on Christmas Eve, 1927. Smith and Dehner bought a farm in Bolton Landing in upstate New York in 1929 and spent much of their married life there. To sustain themselves during the Depression, both Smith and Dehner took on commercial jobs. However, as a result of some family land holdings, Dehner received an annual check for $2,000, which helped support them financially and allowed Smith to focus on his art. In 1931, they dropped everything and took a nine-month trip to St. Thomas in the Virgin Islands. Here, without the distractions of modern life, Dehner was able to focus on her painting. She primarily focused on her still life art. Her subject matter consisted of mostly natural forms, such as shells and aquatic life, while her style remained heavily cubist. Indeed, her work during this time was heavily influenced by the abstraction taught by Matulka at the Art Students League.

=== Europe 1935-36 ===
After a brief sojourn back home in New York, Dehner returned to Europe in 1935 on an extensive tour with Smith. There, John D. Graham took Dehner and Smith all around Paris exposing them to modernist art as well as African sculpture. Following their stay in Paris, in which they were immersed in avant-garde art, particularly in influences of Surrealism and Cubism, Dehner and Smith toured Greece. Dehner entrenched herself in the culture and traditional sculpture of Greece. The sketches she made while in Greece served as the foundational designs for later sculpture based on that trip. The titles of these sculptures, such as Minotaur and Demeter's Harrow reveal clear Greek influence. Despite their avant-garde influences, works of Dehner during this period reflect a focus on naturalism and a desire to depict direct observations. Her work during this trip to Europe highlights the vast range of technique Dehner possessed.

However her second trip to Europe with Smith did more than expose her to the modern and historical art of the continent. While in Europe, Dehner also found reinforcement for her leftist political views. Dehner and Smith both began to link their style of art with their particular political agenda. Many of the Smith's photographs from their travels are of refugee settlements, which were typically epicenters of communist beliefs. The couple acted on this leftward leaning ideology and went on a tour of the Soviet Union in June 1936. In Russia they reunited with Graham and his wife, who focused their attention on the art of Russia and the link between modernist techniques and leftist political messages.

=== Return to Bolton Landing ===
On July 9, 1936, the couple returned to New York. In the spring of 1940 the couple made their permanent residence in Bolton Landing. Dehner was constrained in her artwork both by the stress of farm life and by the often aggressive mood swings of Smith. As a result of the pressure Dehner was put under, she was unable to pursue her passion for sculpture until after their divorce. One outburst on Smith's part caused Dehner to flee Bolton Landing in 1945. After Smith went after her and brought her back to the farm, their relationship remained particularly fragile. She rejected the increased abstraction Smith advocated, as evidenced in her Life on the Farm series of drawings. Some interpret this series as a simple representation of idyllic American farm life but others see it as a commentary on American social life through a Marxist lens. Although the messages of her Life on the Farm series may not be crystal clear, it was evident that during the late 1940s, Dehner underwent serious mental turmoil. She produced many provocative works that expressed this mental fatigue, such as her "Damnation Series" and "Dances of Death."

In 1948, Dehner held a solo exhibition at Skidmore College which was well received. As a result, her confidence rose. Following this well-received exhibition, she read Ernst Haeckel's Kunst formen der Nature, a book of biological prints, and proceeded to incorporate these organismal forms into her artwork. This return to naturalistic forms is reminiscent of her still life from her time in the Virgin Islands. However, reading Haeckel's work marked a progression to more consistent abstraction in Dehner's work. Smith was heavily influenced by her 1948 watercolor Star Cage and eventually made a sculpture one year later of the same name. Dehner had suggested a collaborative work but Smith refused and later denied his sculpture had any connection to Dehner's watercolor. Dehner also embraced other forms of personal expression and possessed a gift for writing. Because of her lingual acuity, Smith asked her to name many of his works. Her interest in writing culminated in her becoming a published poet later in life. In 1950, Smith had another rage-fueled outburst and Dehner left permanently. The couple divorced in 1951. Despite the dramatic ups and downs of their marriage, the twenty three years Dehner spent with Smith contributed to the formation of her own distinct style.

== Later life and sculpture ==
Jacob's Ladder I, bronze of 1957, in the Hirshhorn Museum and Sculpture Garden

Following her divorce from Smith, Dehner earned a degree from Skidmore and began teaching at Barnard College, among other schools. Although an extremely busy and stressful time for Dehner, the two years following her divorce proved vital to her career for she finally felt free to pursue her artistic passions. During this time she experimented with new mediums, engraving and print making, with Stanley William Hayter at Atelier 17. She made intaglio prints at Atelier 17 from 1952, and that same year, had her first solo exhibit at the Rose Fried Gallery. She continued at Atelier 17 until it moved to Paris in 1955, then worked at Pratt Graphics Center until 1960. She was also a member of the Society of American Graphic Artists.

While at Atelier, Dehner learned wax sculpting techniques from a fellow student and in 1955 gained enough confidence to pursue casting her wax sculptures in bronze. This shift from drawing and painting to sculpture marked not only a shift in primary medium but also an end to a period of particular psychological distress. Over the next twenty years her reputation as a sculptor would skyrocket and she would hold exhibitions at the prestigious Willard Gallery in 1957, 1959, 1960, 1963, 1970, and 1973. Dehner's medium eventually shifted from cast metal to wood in 1970s, and eventually Cor-Ten and black painted steel in the 1980s. Despite the change in material, many elements remained iconic in her works, and they retained the same overall composition of form.

Dehner's belief in the communicative power of sculpture caused her to highlight contour over mass. She chose to construct her works from varying parts, a distinctly Constructivist quality. Dehner's sculptures emphasized line and plane over volume and exhibited an assembled as opposed to modeled quality. Despite being abstract, her sculptures are constantly reminiscent of the natural world, invoking both totemic presences and references to the assumption of a landscape.

Her work "Rites at Sal Safaeni Number 2" (1958) was included in "Recent Sculpture USA", a 1959-1960 US travelling exhibition that was presented at the Museum of Modern Art, New York, the Denver Art Museum, Denver, Los Angeles County Museum of Art, Los Angeles, City Art Museum (now Saint Louis Art Museum), St. Louis, and the Museum of Fine Arts, Boston. Dehner's sculptures were also on display at the 1960 Paris exhibition "Aspects of American Culture." Like many of the other works included, hers were primarily distinguished by their improvisation. In 1965, The Jewish Museum in New York City put on a retrospective exhibit of Dehner's sculpture. This achievement is miraculous considering that she only began sculpture a decade earlier. In 1966 she had a solo exhibition, "Dorothy Dehner: Recent Bronzes." It was held in Willard Gallery, New York City. Dehner began experimenting with wood sculpture in 1974, following the death of her second husband. Much of Dehner's sculpture can be identified by its totemic qualities and emphasis on Constructivist principles. Additionally, it differs uniquely from Smith's work in its medium and construction. Much of Smith's sculpture employed welding as a construction technique, which Dehner did not embrace. In 1981 she took her sculpture to the next level, literally, and experimented with massive steel sculptures. She received a Lifetime Achievement Award in 1983 from the Women's Caucus for Art. In 1988 Dehner had solo exhibitions featuring her large welded pieces at Twining Fine Art, New York, and at Muhlenberg College, Allentown, Pennsylvania. This was the first time in her life that Dehner had a generous personal income. By 1991 Dehner had lost nearly all of her vision and stopped sculpting. By 1990, however, Dehner was working with fabricators who helped transform some of her earlier drawings into sculptures such as the painted aluminium wall piece. After a prominent career in art, Dehner was found dead in a stairwell outside her apartment in Manhattan on September 22, 1994, at the age of ninety-two. The Cleveland Museum of Art honored Dehner with a retrospective in 1995.
