= Podmoky (Havlíčkův Brod District) =

- Municipality
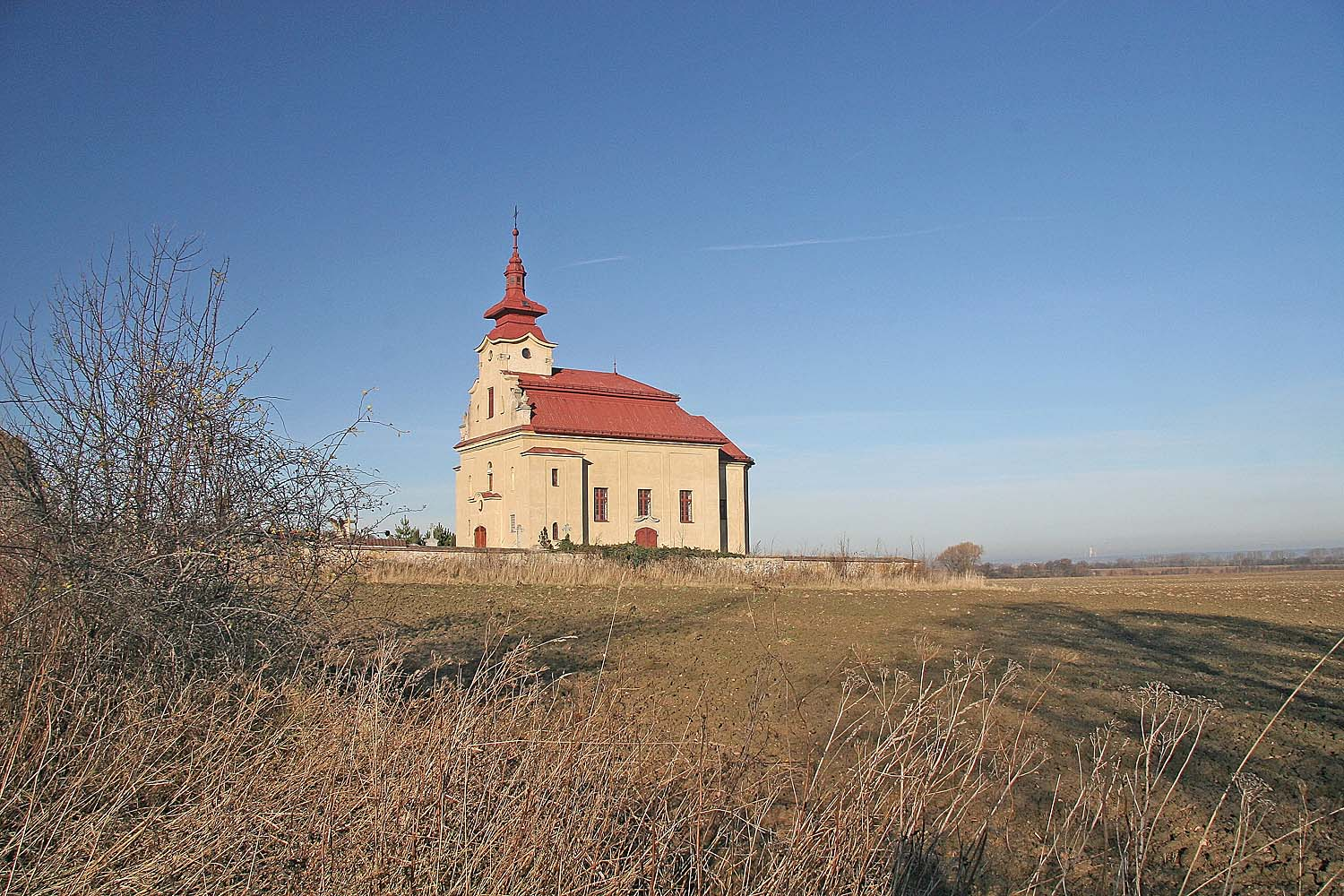
- Church of Saint Bartholomew

- Location in the Czech Republic
- Coordinates: 49°49′49″N 15°26′20″E
- Country: Czech Republic
- Region: Vysočina
- District: Havlíčkův Brod
- First mentioned: 1360

Area
  - Total: 9.70 km^{2} (3.75 sq mi)
- Elevation: 340 m (1,120 ft)

Population (2026-01-01)
  - Total: 156
  - Density: 16.1/km^{2} (41.7/sq mi)
- Time zone: UTC+1 (CET)
  - Summer (DST): UTC+2 (CEST)
- Postal code: 582 82
- Website: www.obecpodmoky.cz

Podmoky is a municipality and village in Havlíčkův Brod District in the Vysočina Region of the Czech Republic. It has about 200 inhabitants.

Podmoky lies approximately 27 kilometres (17 mi) north of Havlíčkův Brod, 49 km (30 mi) north of Jihlava, and 79 km (49 mi) east of Prague.

== Demographics ==
Historical population
Year	Pop.	±%
1869	470	—
1880	546	+16.2%
1890	497	−9.0%
1900	493	−0.8%
1910	542	+9.9%
1921	551	+1.7%
1930	485	−12.0%
1950	342	−29.5%
1961	303	−11.4%
1970	249	−17.8%
1980	202	−18.9%
1991	139	−31.2%
2001	100	−28.1%
2011	113	+13.0%
2021	123	+8.8%
Source: Censuses
