= Podmoky (Nymburk District) =

- Municipality
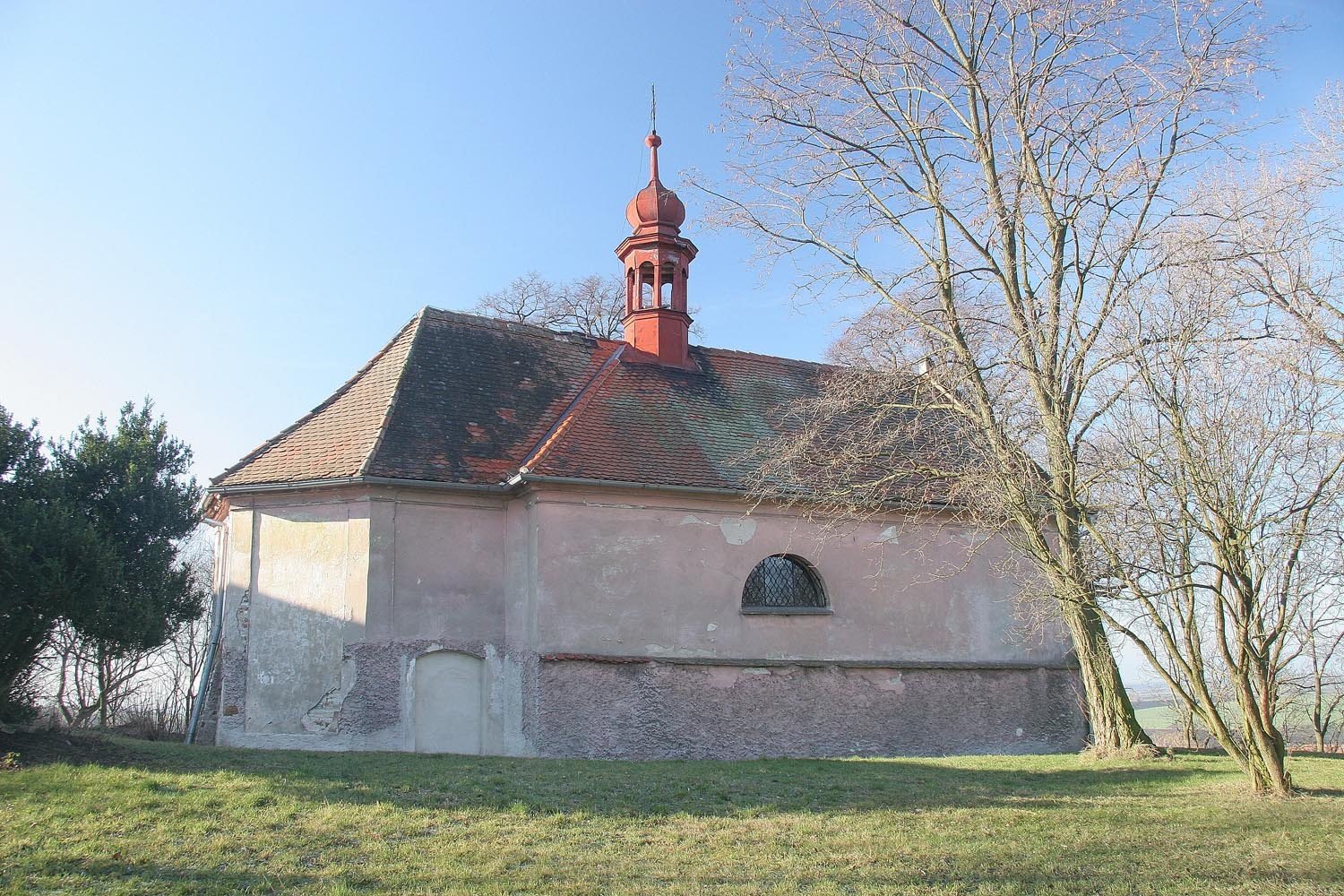
- Church of Saint Bartholomew

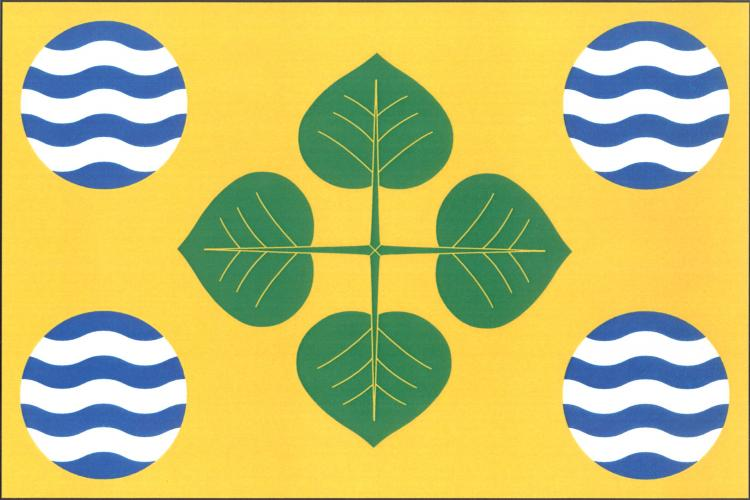
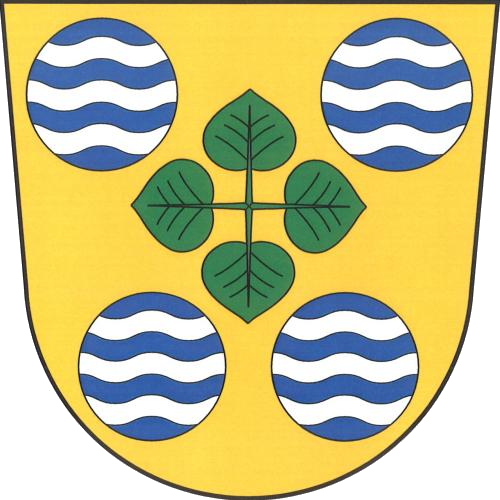
- Flag Coat of arms

- Location in the Czech Republic
- Coordinates: 50°11′29″N 15°13′56″E
- Country: Czech Republic
- Region: Central Bohemian
- District: Nymburk
- First mentioned: 1305

Area
  - Total: 8.48 km^{2} (3.27 sq mi)
- Elevation: 219 m (719 ft)

Population (2026-01-01)
  - Total: 200
  - Density: 24/km^{2} (61/sq mi)
- Time zone: UTC+1 (CET)
  - Summer (DST): UTC+2 (CEST)
- Postal code: 289 04
- Website: www.podmoky.cz

Podmoky is a municipality and village in Nymburk District in the Central Bohemian Region of the Czech Republic. It has about 200 inhabitants.

== Demographics ==
Historical population
Year	Pop.	±%
1869	429	—
1880	500	+16.6%
1890	479	−4.2%
1900	521	+8.8%
1910	590	+13.2%
1921	579	−1.9%
1930	525	−9.3%
1950	340	−35.2%
1961	253	−25.6%
1970	231	−8.7%
1980	211	−8.7%
1991	185	−12.3%
2001	166	−10.3%
2011	183	+10.2%
2021	201	+9.8%
Source: Censuses
