= 1952 in art =

This is a list of events in art from the year 1952.

== Events ==
- August 29 – Composer John Cage's 4′33″, during which the performer does not play, premieres in Maverick Concert Hall, Woodstock, New York.
- Eight younger British artists (Robert Adams, Kenneth Armitage, Reg Butler, Lynn Chadwick, Geoffrey Clarke, Bernard Meadows, Eduardo Paolozzi and William Turnbull) are represented in the "New Aspects of British Sculpture" exhibition at the Venice Biennale which Herbert Read describes as the "Geometry of Fear". Britain also displays paintings by Graham Sutherland and Edward Wadsworth.
- Louis le Brocquy's 1951 painting A Family sparks controversy in Ireland when a group of art patrons offer to present it to the Dublin Municipal Gallery and it is rejected by the Art Advisory Committee on the grounds of incompetence.
- Henri Cartier-Bresson's photographic collection Images à la sauvette is published by Tériade in Paris.
- Publication of Un Art Autre, by Michel Tapié.

== Awards ==
- Archibald Prize: William Dargie – Mr Essington Lewis, CH
- Prix Puvis de Chavannes – Tristan Klingsor

== Works ==
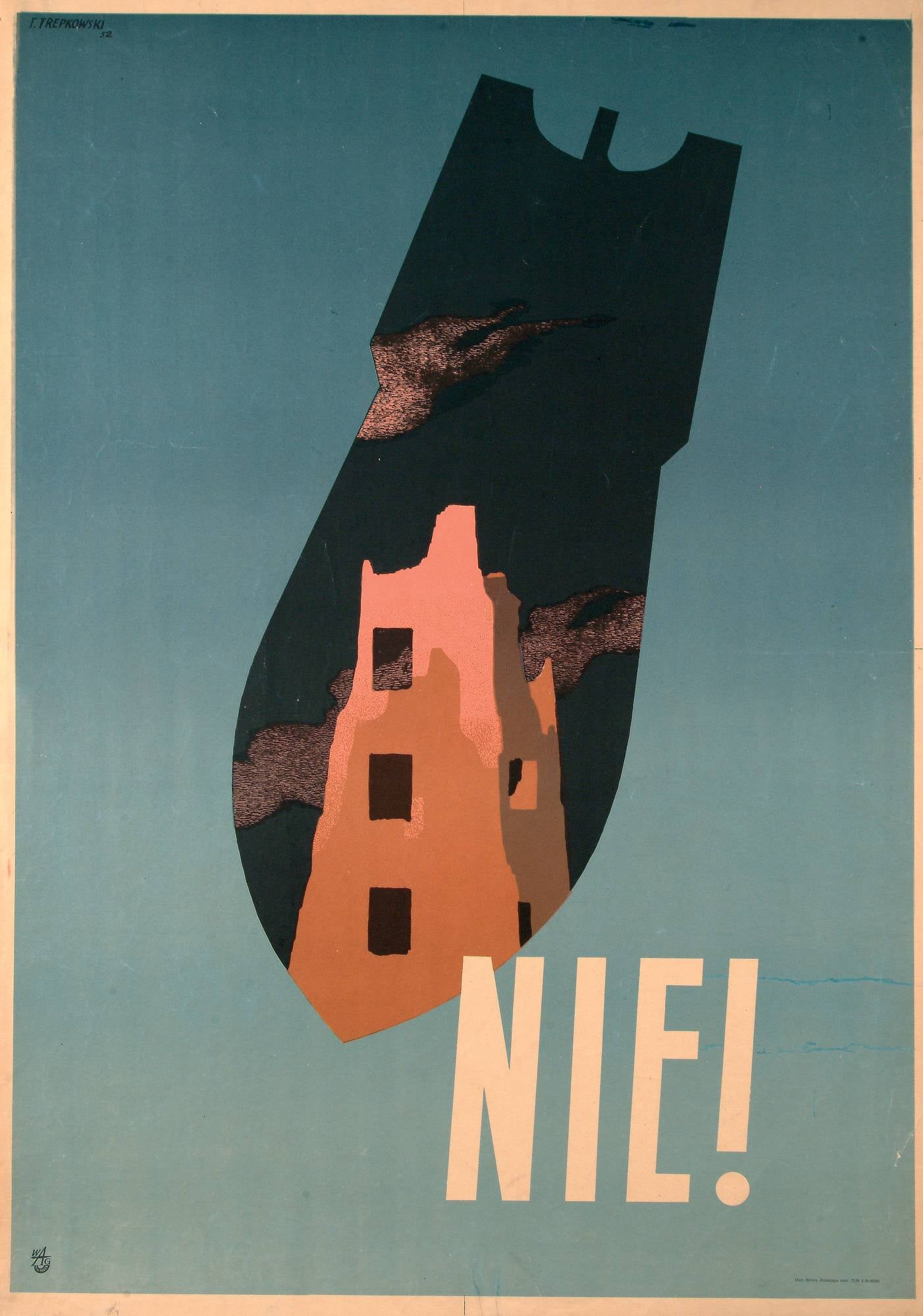
Tadeusz Trepkowski – Nie!

- Michael Andrews – A Man who Suddenly Fell Over
- Francis Bacon
  - Figure in a landscape
  - Study for Crouching Nude
- Salvador Dalí – Galatea of the Spheres
- Nicolas de Stael - Le Parc des Princes
- Dwight D. Eisenhower – Field Marshal Bernard Montgomery
- M. C. Escher
  - Gravitation
  - Puddle
- Helen Frankenthaler – Mountains and Sea
- Lucian Freud – Girl In Bed
- Elisabeth Frink – Bird
- Willem de Kooning – Woman I
- Henri Laurens – L'Amphion (sculpture, University City of Caracas)
- René Magritte – The Listening Room
- Henri Matisse – cutouts
  - series of Blue Nudes, e.g., Blue Nude I, Blue Nude II
  - Black Leaf on Green Background
  - La Négresse
  - The Sorrows of the King
- John Minton – The Death of Nelson
- Henry Moore – King and Queen (bronze)
- Jackson Pollock – Blue Poles
- Germaine Richier - The Devil with Claws
- Kay Sage – On the Contrary
- David Smith – Agricola I (sculpture)
- Tom Stefopoulos – Lovejoy Columns in Portland, Oregon, pre-exiasiting structures painted by
- Dorothea Tanning – The Friend's Room
- Tadeusz Trepkowski – Nie! (propaganda poster)

== Exhibitions ==
- September 25 – November 9 – Jacob Epstein retrospective, Tate Gallery, London
- Exhibition of forgeries, Stedelijk Museum Amsterdam

== Births ==
- March 18 – Sally Robinson, English-born Australian painter
- May 23 – Martin Parr, English documentary colour photographer (d. 2025)
- July 15 – Darryl Pottorf, Aamerican artist
- August 13 – Herb Ritts, American photographer (d. 2002)
- October 20 – Derek Ridgers, English portrait and street culture photographer
- November 15 – Blek le Rat (Xavier Prou), French stencil graffiti artist
- November 22 – Corno (Joanne Corneau), Canadian post-pop painter (d. 2016)
- date unknown
  - Graham Forsythe, Northern Irish/Canadian painter
  - Duncan Hannah, American painter (d. 2022)
  - Mona Hatoum, Lebanese-born Palestinian multimedia artist
  - James Little, American painter
  - Daniel Meadows, English photographer
  - Ian Rank-Broadley, English sculptor

== Deaths ==
- March 3 – Howard Chandler Christy, American painter and illustrator (b. 1873)
- April 9 – Caroline Risque, American sculptor and painter (b. 1883)
- May 5 – Alberto Savinio, Italian writer and painter (b. 1891)
- May 6 – Oswald Birley (b. 1880)
- June 9 – Alice Austen, American photographer (b. 1866)
- August 16 – Lydia Field Emmet, American painter (b. 1866)
- October 15 – Katharine Adams, English bookbinder (b. 1862)
- December 15 – Goscombe John, Welsh sculptor (b. 1860)
- date unknown:
  - Arthur Beecher Carles, American Modernist painter (b. 1882)
  - William Lee Hankey, English painter and illustrator (b. 1869)
  - Nicolas Sursock, Lebanese art collector (b. 1875)

== See also ==
- 1952 in fine arts of the Soviet Union
