= Cubi XII =

Sculpture by David Smith

- Artist: David Smith
- Year: 1963
- Type: sculpture
- Dimensions: 278.1 cm × 120 cm × 66 cm (109 1/2 in × 49 in × 26 in)
- Location: Hirshhorn Museum and Sculpture Garden; Washington, D.C.; 38.888333°N 77.023056°W
- Owner: Hirshhorn Museum

Cubi XII is an abstract sculpture by David Smith.

Constructed of stainless steel, completed on April 7 1963, it was purchased from his estate by the Hirshhorn Museum and Sculpture Garden in 1968.

It is a part of the Cubi series. He used the shiny finish to contrast with the landscape. The circular grind marks change in varying lighting conditions.

== See also ==
- List of public art in Washington, D.C., Ward 2
