= Blue Nude =

Blue Nude may refer to:

- Blue Nude (Souvenir de Biskra) by Matisse
- Blue Nudes, a series of blue painted paper cutouts executed in 1952 by Matisse
- Blue Nude (Picasso) by Picasso, painted during his blue period
- Blue Nude (Bonnard) by Pierre Bonnard
- "Blue Nude", a song by Babylon Zoo
