= Cubi =

Group of sculptures by David Smith

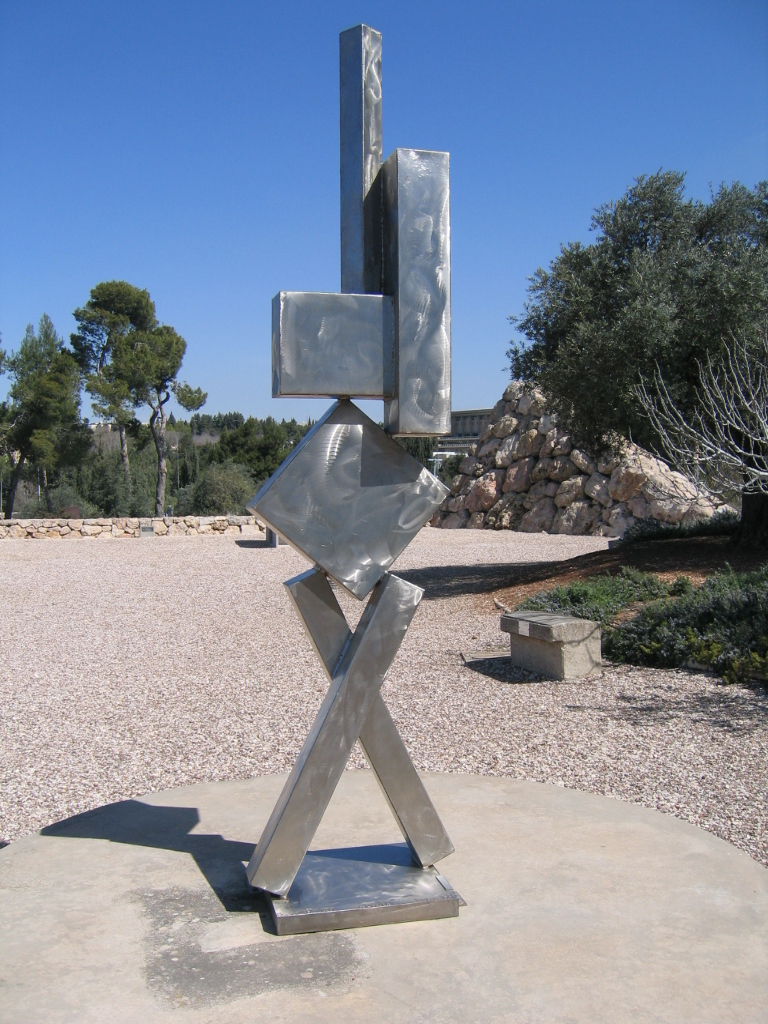
CUBI VI (1963), Israel Museum, Jerusalem.

The Cubi series is a group of stainless steel sculptures built from cubes, rectangular solids and cylinders with spheroidal or flat endcaps. These pieces are among the last works completed by the sculptor David Smith. The artist died in a car accident on May 23, 1965, soon after the completion of Cubi XXVIII, which may or may not have been the last sculpture he intended to create in this series. The Cubis are among Smith's final experiments in his progression toward a more simplified, abstract form of expression. As an example of modernism, these are representative of the monumental works in industrial materials that characterized much of the sculpture from this period.

Although the Cubis are abstract works composed of geometric shapes, they are ambiguously figural. For example, the pictured Cubi VI appears to be standing on a pair of crossed legs. Like many of the abstract expressionists, Smith possessed the ability to easily switch between an abstract and figurative style of working. His process also involved going back and forth between the different stages of development within a certain style or serial group, as suggested by the Cubis. These sculptures were not completed in the order in which they are numbered, as revealed by the inscriptions (see below) that Smith welded onto the base of each.

Today, the majority of the Cubi works are part of well-known museum collections around the world, including the Museum of Modern Art in New York, the Tate Modern in London and the Art Institute of Chicago. In 2005, Cubi XXVIII was sold at Sotheby's for $23.8 million, breaking a record for the most expensive piece of contemporary art ever sold at auction. "This exceedingly rare work was the pinnacle of a four-decade career," said Tobias Meyer, Sotheby's worldwide head of contemporary art and the auctioneer for the evening.

- Cubi I March 4, 1963
- Cubi II October 25, 1962
- Cubi III November 10, 1961
- Cubi IV January 17, 1963
- Cubi V January 16, 1963
- Cubi VI March 21, 1963
- Cubi VII March 28, 1963
- Cubi VIII December 24, 1962
- Cubi IX October 26, 1961
- Cubi X April 4,1963
- Cubi XI March 30, 1963
- Cubi XII April 7, 1963
- Cubi XIII March 25, 1963
- Cubi XIV September 25, 1963
- Cubi XV September 27, 1963
- Cubi XVI November 4, 1963
- Cubi XVII December 4, 1963
- Cubi XVIII February 14, 1964
- Cubi XIX February 20, 1964
- Cubi XX February 20, 1964
- Cubi XXI April 4, 1964
- Cubi XXII June 5, 1964
- Cubi XXIII November 30, 1964
- Cubi XXIV December 8, 1964
- Cubi XXV January 9, 1965
- Cubi XXVI January 12, 1965
- Cubi XXVII March 5, 1965
- Cubi XXVIII May 5, 1965
