= Glenkiln Sculpture Park =

Sculpture landscape in Scotland

Coordinates: 55.083779°N 3.819945°W

Glenkiln Sculpture Park was a sculpture landscape in the historic county of Kirkcudbrightshire in Dumfries and Galloway, south-west Scotland.

It comprised six sculptures placed in a moorland setting around Glenkiln Reservoir. The sculptures were located around 4 kilometres (2.5 mi) north-west of Shawhead, and 12 kilometres (7.5 mi) west of the town of Dumfries.

Between 1951 and 1976, local landowner Sir William "Tony" Keswick (grandson of William Keswick) assembled a collection of works by Auguste Rodin, Henry Moore, and Jacob Epstein Keswick worked with the artists in siting their works in a natural landscape, and commissioned works.

In 1995 the King and Queen sculpture was vandalised but was later restored.In 2013, the Standing Figure was stolen. Following that, all the sculptures except Glenkiln Cross were removed for security reasons on police advice.

The sculptures formerly on show are:

- Saint John the Baptist (1878) by Auguste Rodin
- Visitation (1926) by Jacob Epstein
- Standing Figure (1950) by Henry Moore
- King and Queen (1952–53) by Henry Moore
- Upright Motive No. 1: Glenkiln Cross (1955–56) by Henry Moore
- Two Piece Reclining Figure No.1 (1959) by Henry Moore

There is also a memorial to commemorate the diamond wedding of Sir William and Lady Keswick and another to Peter Fleming the travel writer and adventurer, friend of the Keswicks, who used to shoot on the estate.

== Gallery ==
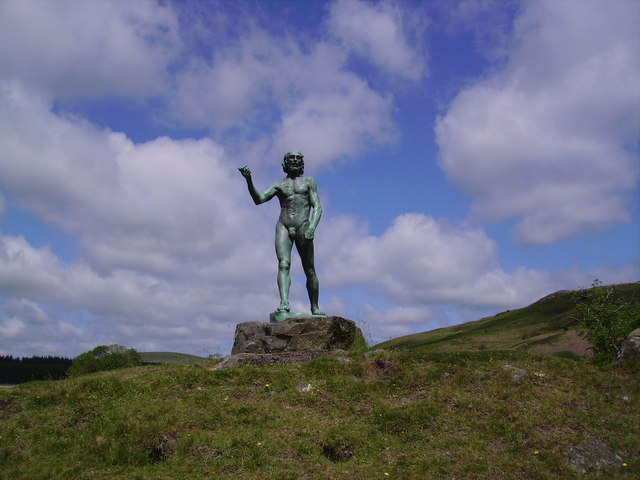
John the Baptist

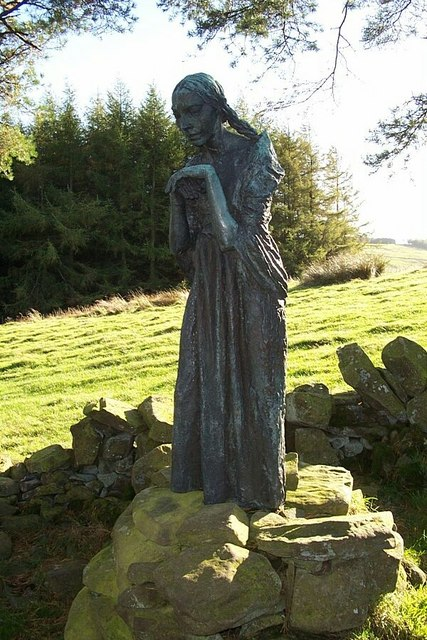
Visitation

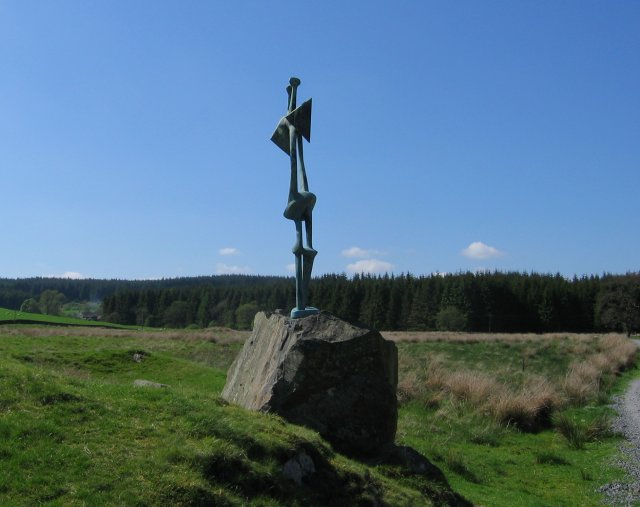
Standing Figure

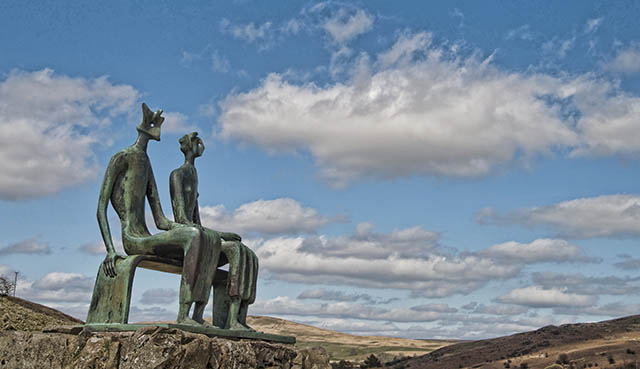
King and Queen

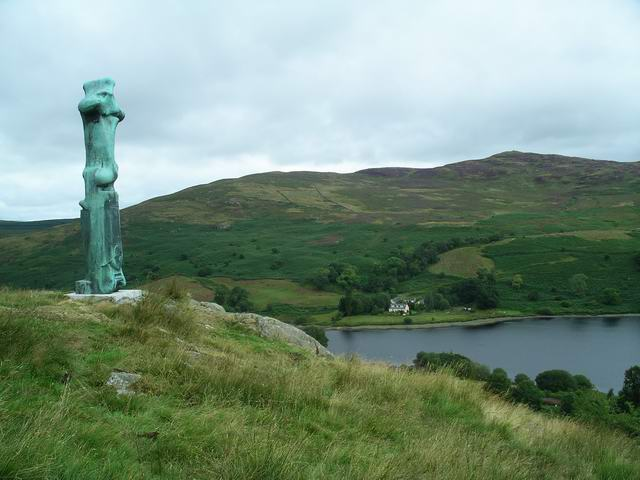
Glenkiln Cross

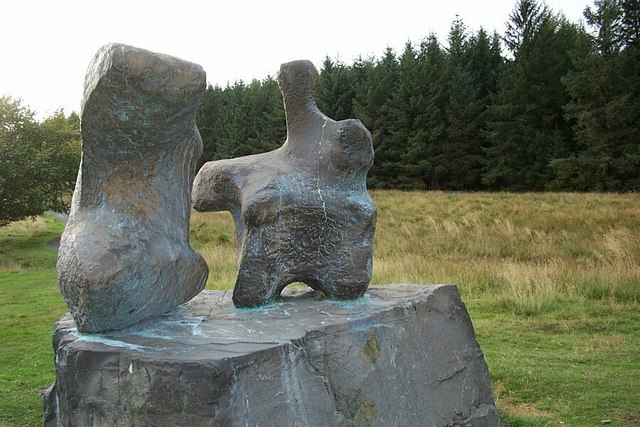
Two Piece Reclining Figure No.1
