= Study for Crouching Nude =

1952 painting by Francis Bacon

- Artist: Francis Bacon
- Year: 1952
- Type: Oil on canvas
- Dimensions: 198 cm × 137 cm (78 in × 54 in)
- Location: Detroit Institute of Arts, Detroit

Study for Crouching Nude is an oil painting on canvas by the Irish-born artist Francis Bacon. It was painted in the spring of 1952 and shows a perched figure whose form was likely derived from Eadweard Muybridge's Man Performing a Standing Jump. The painting was first displayed – in place of Study for Portrait (1949) – at Recent Trends in Realist Painting (organized by Robert Melville and David Sylvester) at the Institute of Contemporary Arts, London, from July to August 1952. It is held at the Detroit Institute of Arts.

== See also ==
- List of paintings by Francis Bacon
- 1952 in art
