= Cubi XXVI =

Sculpture by David Smith

- Artist: David Smith
- Year: 1965
- Type: sculpture
- Dimensions: 303.5 cm × 383.5 cm × 65.7 cm (119 1/2 in × 151 in × 25 7/8 in)
- Location: National Gallery of Art Sculpture Garden; Washington, D.C.; 38.890792°N 77.023092°W
- Owner: National Gallery of Art

Cubi XXVI is an abstract sculpture by David Smith, in the National Gallery of Art Sculpture Garden in Washington, D.C., US.

Constructed of stainless steel on January 12, 1965, it was purchased in 1978. It was on loan to the White House. The sculpture is a part of Smith's Cubi series.

== See also ==
- List of public art in Washington, D.C., Ward 2
