= King and Queen (sculpture) =

Sculpture series by Henry Moore

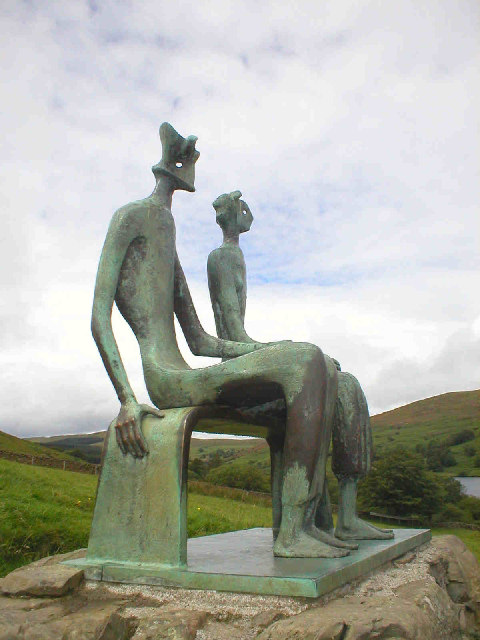
- At Glenkiln, Scotland (now removed from public view)
- Artist: Henry Moore
- Year: 1952
- Catalogue: LH 350
- Medium: Bronze
- Dimensions: 164 cm × 138.5 cm × 84.5 cm (65 in × 54.5 in × 33.3 in)

King and Queen (LH 350) is a bronze sculpture by Henry Moore, designed in 1952. It depicts two figures, one male and one female, seated beside each other on a bench, both facing slightly to the left. It is Moore's only sculpture depicting a single pair of adult figures. Moore's records suggest it was originally known as Two Seated Figures.

Ten bronze casts of the 27 centimetres (11 in) high maquette were cast in 1952. Five bronze casts of the 164 centimetres (65 in) high full-size sculpture were made in 1953, with one further cast in 1957 and another in the 1980s, creating an edition of "5 +2" (five for sale, and two artist's copies). Examples are held by the Middelheim Open Air Sculpture Museum, Glenkiln Sculpture Park (now removed from public view), Hirshhorn Museum and Sculpture Garden, Norton Simon Museum, Tate Gallery, MOA Museum of Art, and the Henry Moore Foundation.

== Maquettes ==
According to Moore speaking years later, the work was inspired by double statues of male and female figures from Ancient Egypt, and by fairy tales read to his daughter Mary. Art critics have suggested links with the accession of Elizabeth II in 1952, and have identified a strikingly similar photograph of Moore and his wife Irina seated beside each other c.1952, in which Moore has one hand clenched in his lap and the other on the arm of the sofa, and Irina sits beside him with her fingers interlaced.

It was based on preliminary drawings of seated figures from the late 1940s. Inspiration came to Moore from playing with pieces of wax which became an initial maquette in 1952. He first created a bearded head with a crown which became the "king" figure, then the female "queen" and the bench. The king had a clenched fist, and the feet lack detail. The maquette had a narrow squared frame behind the figures, defining the space, recalling similar frames used by Alberto Giacometti for example in his The Nose and The Cage, and the frames used repeatedly in the paintings of Francis Bacon, such as his Three Studies of the Male Back. The 27 centimetres (11 in) high maquette was later cast in an edition of ten bronzes (LH 348). Examples were sold at Sotheby's in 2001 for £531,500, at Christie's in 2010 for over US$2.8m, and at Sotheby's in 2016 for £1.1m.

A copy of the maquette was made in plaster, but only fragments survive. It was used to scale up the sculpture to a full-size plaster working model, Maquette for King and Queen 1952–3. Anthony Caro made a three quarter size terracotta model of the queen figure, which was cast in bronze in an edition of five, as Seated Figure 1952–3 (LH 345). In this work, the hands are ill defined, and the head does not have the crown-like looping feature.

== Description ==
The full size sculpture is 165 centimetres (65 in) high. It depicts two figures, one male and one female, seated beside each other on a bench, both facing slightly to the left.

The male figure to the left is slightly taller and broader, and sits slightly further back. It has two angular jawlines that reach forward towards a prominent chin, where it meets a third line marking the nose, with excavated cheeks and eyehole pierced between the nose ridge. There is a semi-circular loop adornment on top of the head, like a crown. The figure has narrow arms, with one hand one in the figure's lap and the other resting on the bench. The broad, flattened torso has few features and it is probably clothed. The legs are mostly covered by a folded tunic, with ankles and bare feet visible, feet resting on the ground. The hollowed concave back of the figure is incised with vertical lines recalling a backbone.

The female figure to the right is in a similar seated pose. It has a similar flattened face with pierced eyehole but no prominent jawline. There are incised eyelashes around the hole on the left side of the face. Bumps at the back of the head suggests a piled up arrangement of hair, and a loop over the head suggests a diadem or tiara. The figure has a similar flattened body, but with two domed breasts. Its thin arms lead to hands clasped on the figure's lap. It is also wearing a tunic, with pleats that cover most of the legs except the feet.

Moore paid special attention to hands in the final model, to give it additional interest for the viewer. He used the hands of his wife Irina and his six year old daughter Mary, and others, as models . Moore's assistant Alan Ingham modelled for the feet of the king figure. The head of the queen figure was remodelled three times before Moore was satisfied. In the final work, Moore left out the square frame behind the figures in the maquette: he said it made them look like they were goalkeepers at a soccer game.

== Casts ==
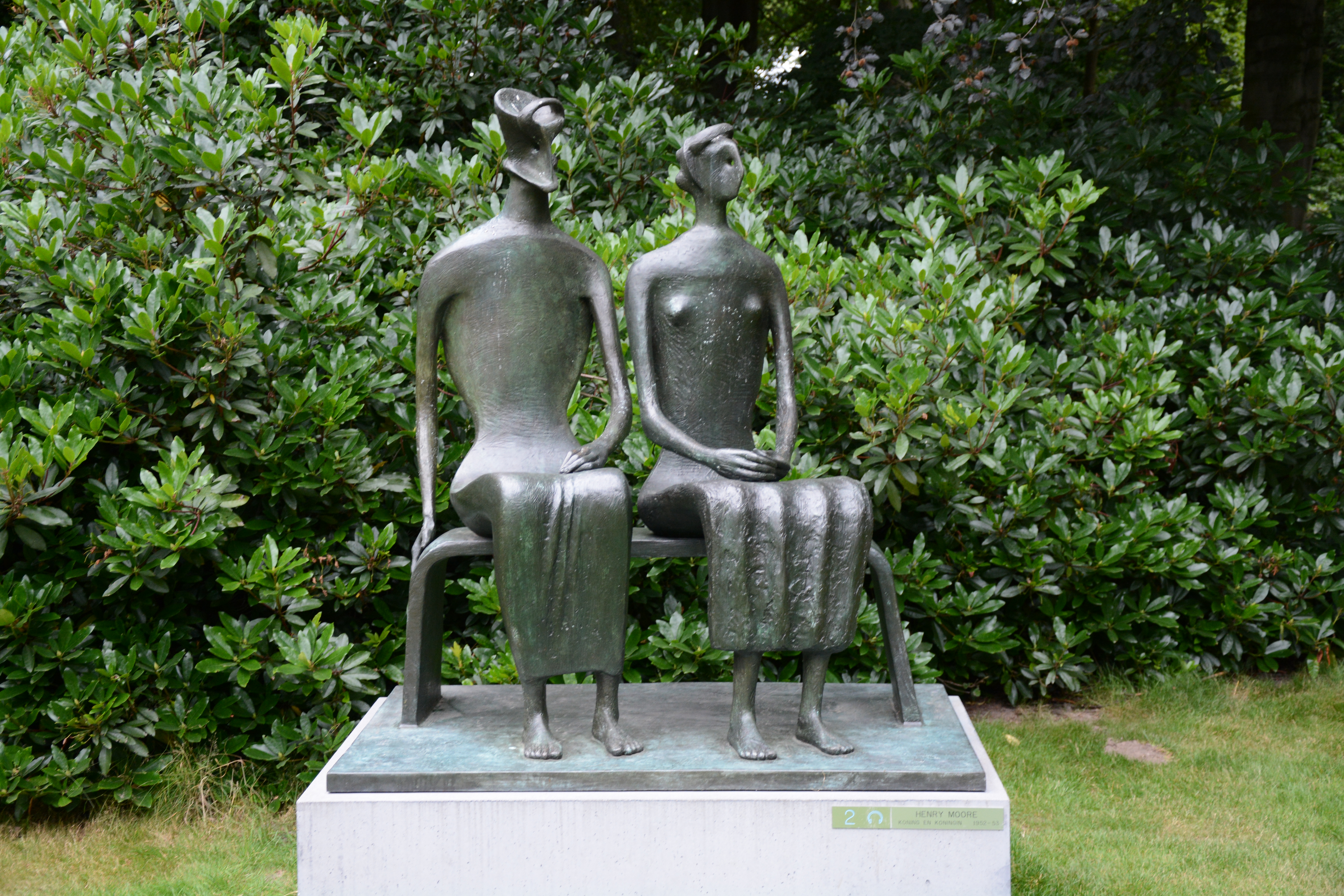
Cast 1, Middelheim Open Air Sculpture Museum

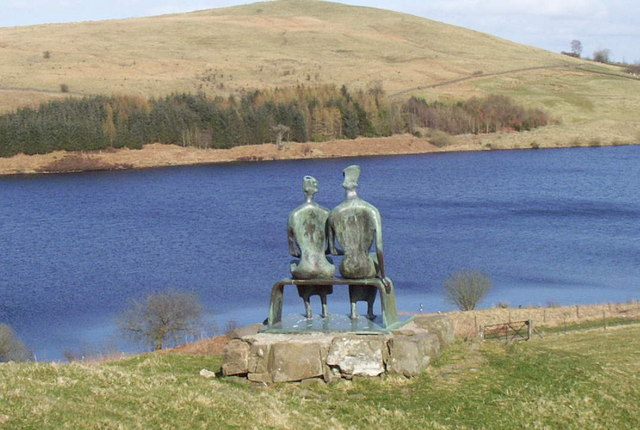
Cast 2, Glenkiln Sculpture Park

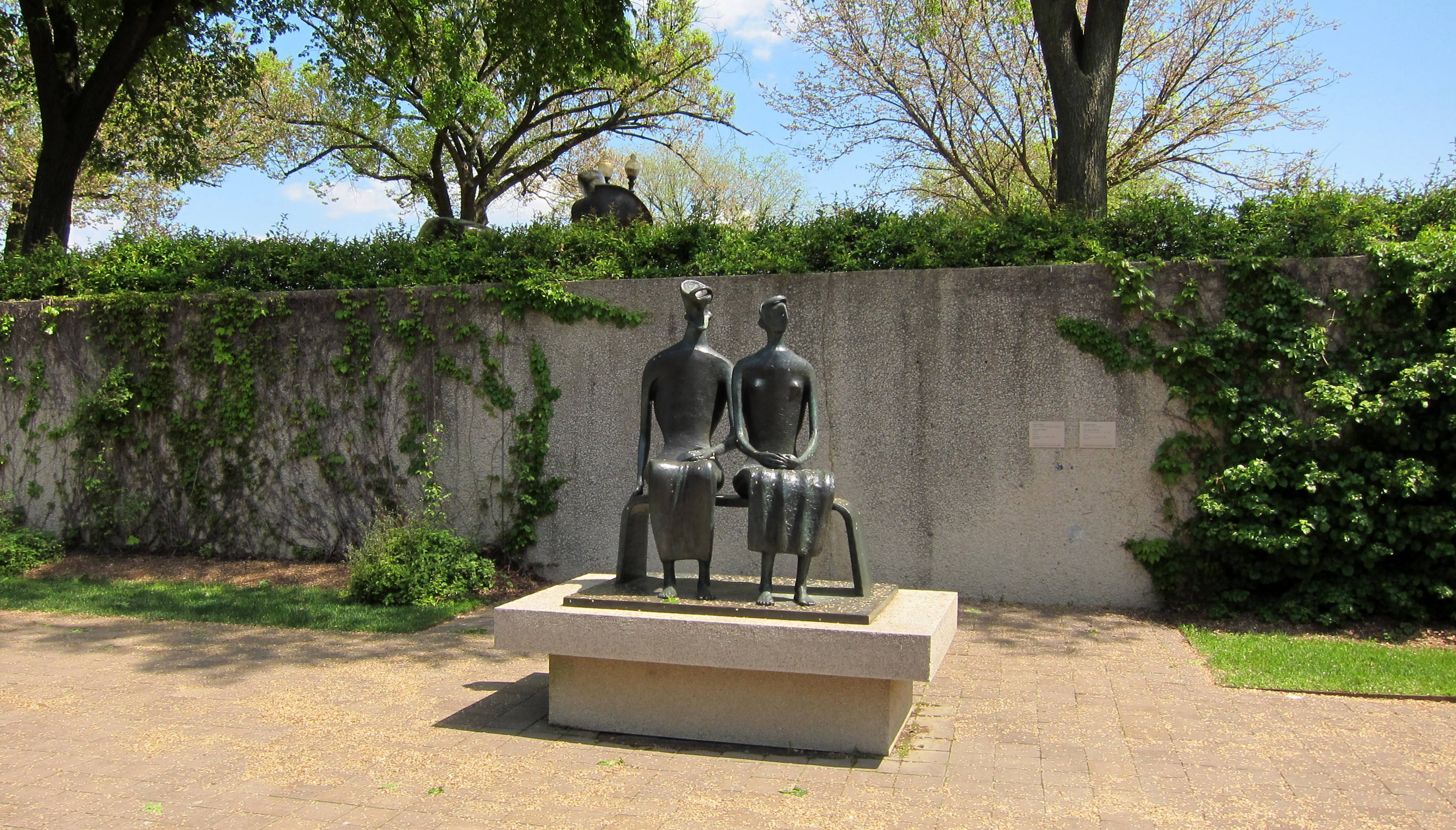
Cast 3, Hirshhorn Museum and Sculpture Garden

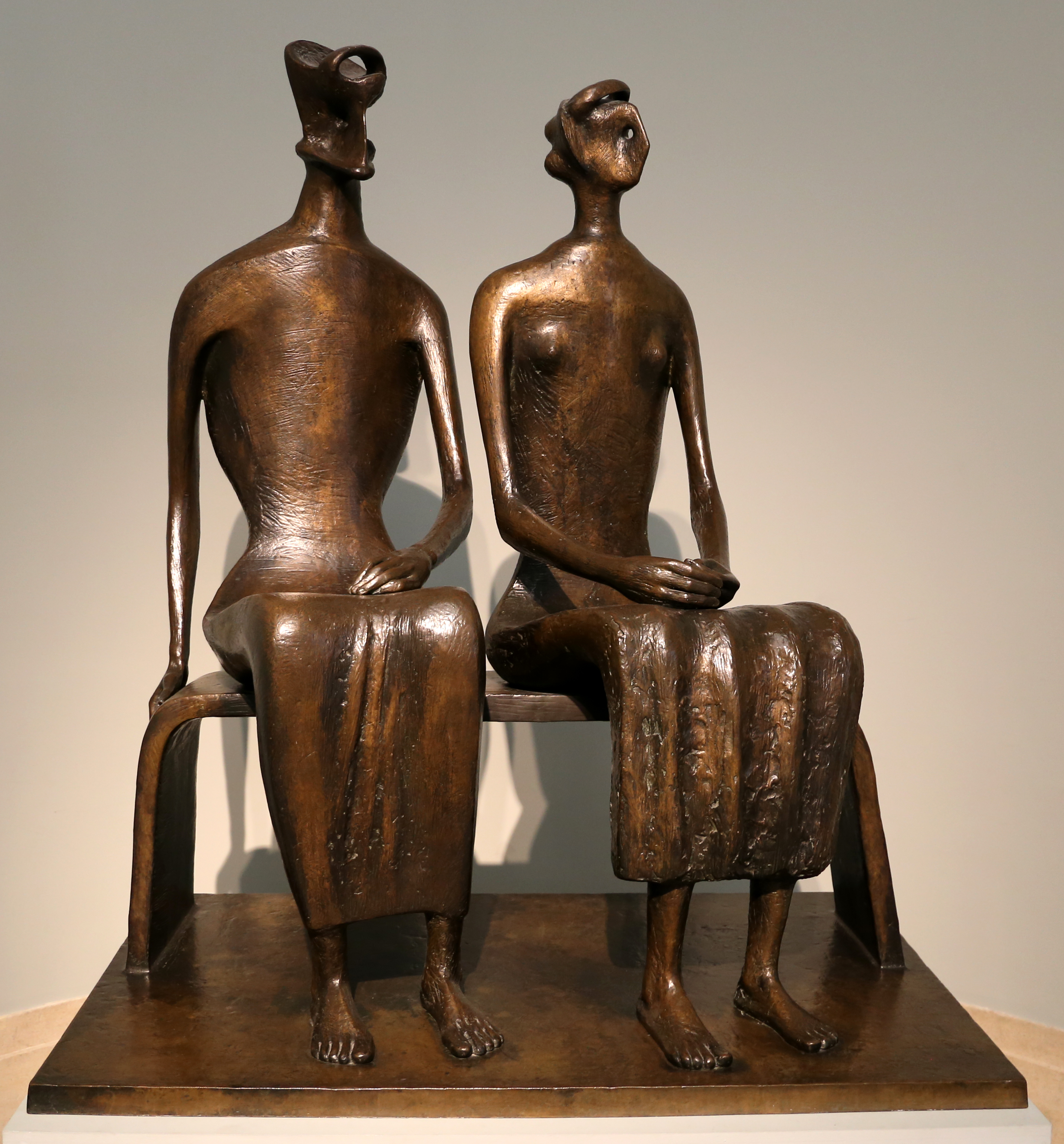
Cast 5, Tate Britain

Moore completed a full-size model in plaster in 1953, and it was cast at the Art Bronze Foundry in London, using the lost wax technique to create pieces that were then welded together, to create an edition of 4+1 (four for sale, and one artist's copy). A fifth numbered cast and second artist's copy were cast later.

The first full-size cast of the sculpture was exhibited at the Second Biennial for Sculpture at Middelheim Park in Antwerp in 1953. It was bought by the city of Antwerp for the Middelheim Open Air Sculpture Museum, where it remains. It measures 170 by 150 by 95 centimetres (67 in × 59 in × 37 in).

The second cast was bought by Sir William Keswick in 1954 and installed on his estate at Glenkiln in Kirkcudbrightshire, on a rock outcrop looking over Glenkiln Loch. It was formerly part of the Glenkiln Sculpture Park. This cast was decapitated in 1995 but later restored.

A third cast was exhibited at the Curt Valentin Gallery in New York, was bought by Joseph H. Hirshhorn, and is now in the Hirshhorn Museum and Sculpture Garden in Washington, D.C.

A fourth cast was exhibited at the Leicester Galleries in London in February 1954, to mixed reviews, some disliking the mixture of figurative and abstract elements. It was described by Robert Melville in 1954 as "Moore's finest achievement since the war, and probably the most graceful of all his works". It was bought by newspaper editor David Astor, and displayed at his home in St John's Wood, until sold to the Norton Simon Museum of Art in Pasadena in 1976.

A fifth cast was made for the Tate Gallery in 1957, acquired using funds donated by Associated Rediffusion, delivered in early 1959. It measures 163.5 by 138.5 by 84.5 centimetres (64.4 in × 54.5 in × 33.3 in)

The original artist's copy (cast 0) is now in the collection of the MOA Museum of Art in Atami, Japan. A second artist's copy, cast 00, was created in the 1980s for the Henry Moore Foundation, and is displayed at Perry Green, Hertfordshire.

== See also ==
- 1952 in art
- List of sculptures by Henry Moore
