= Ronald Grimshaw =

British artist

Ronald Grimshaw (1905–1982) was an artist. He was born in Oswaldtwistle, Lancashire and trained at the Royal College of Art, studying stained glass. He also worked with pottery. He taught at Bolton College of Art and Lancaster School of Art where he worked until his retirement. Many of Grimshaw's talented students went to the Royal College of Art. Some of his students included actor Frankie Vaughan, performer John Waite, sculptor Geoffrey Clarke, painter Audrey Pilkington and photographer Geoffrey Ireland.

His body of work consists of many oil paintings and smaller gouache paintings. His style was influenced by Piet Mondrian, Matisse and Picasso. The oil paintings depict abstract landscapes using pointillist techniques. The gouache paintings depict abstract portraits of faces and dancers.

He wrote the novel Bitter Harvest, in the late 1930s. He also wrote poetry.
