= Cubi XI =

Sculpture by David Smith

- Artist: David Smith
- Year: 1963
- Type: sculpture
- Dimensions: 230 cm × 74 cm × 97 cm (92 in × 29 in × 38 in)
- Location: National Gallery of Art Sculpture Garden; Washington, D.C.; 38.891389°N 77.023056°W
- Owner: National Gallery of Art

Cubi XI is an abstract sculpture by David Smith. It is a part of the Cubi series of sculptures.

Constructed in 1963, it was installed on April 21, 1964, at 1875 Connecticut Avenue, N.W. near Sheridan Circle. It is in the National Gallery of Art Sculpture Garden.

== See also ==
- List of public art in Washington, D.C., Ward 2
