= Upright Motive No. 1: Glenkiln Cross =

Sculpture series by Henry Moore

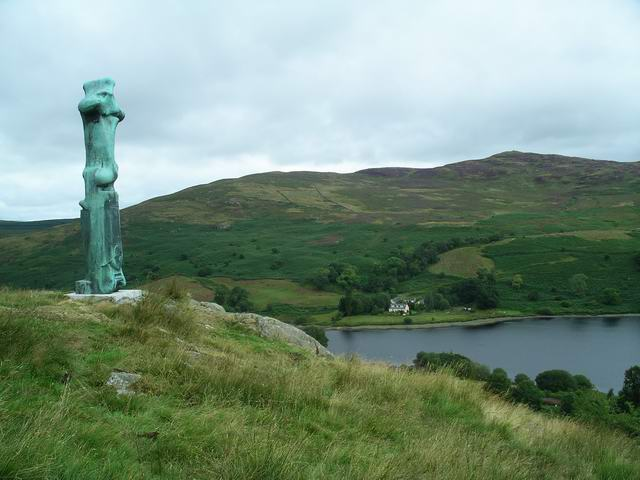
- Sculpture near Glenkiln reservoir
- Artist: Henry Moore
- Year: 1955–56
- Catalogue: LH 377
- Type: Bronze
- Dimensions: 333.7 cm × 97.5 cm × 97 cm (131 3/8 in × 38 3/8 in × 38 in)

Upright Motive No. 1: Glenkiln Cross (LH 377) is a bronze sculpture by Henry Moore, cast in a number of copies in 1955–56. It was the first of a series of narrow vertical sculptures by Moore, who compared them to totem poles.

== Edition ==
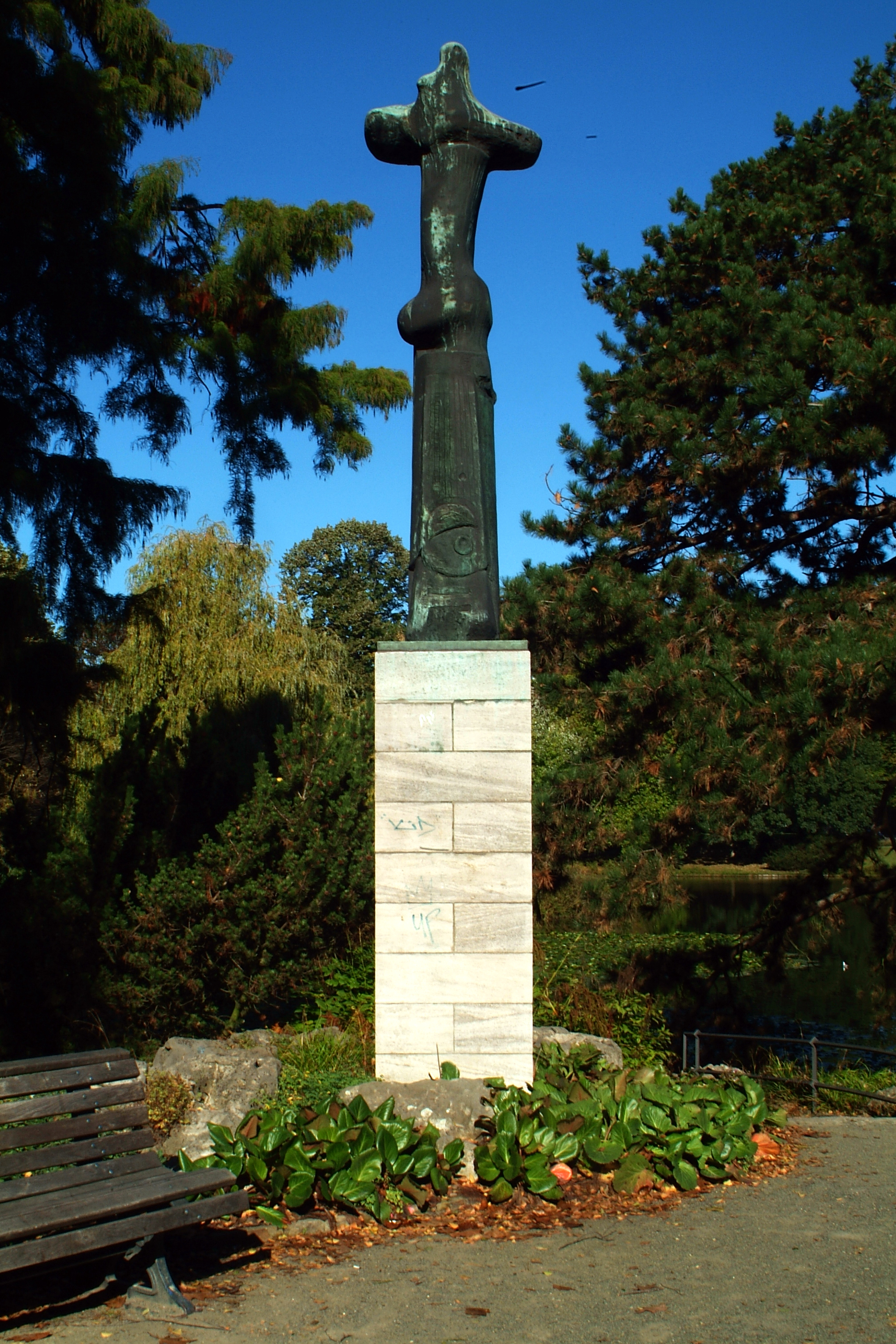
Glenkiln Scottish Cross, Maschpark, Hannover 1960

There are versions in Glenkiln Sculpture Park, in Galloway, Scotland, from where it takes its name, the Kroller-Muller Museum in Otterlo in the Netherlands, the Amon Carter Museum in Fort Worth, Texas, and the Hirshhorn Museum and Sculpture Garden in Washington, D.C. Some of these are mounted in a row with others of the "Upright Motive" series, as at Otterlo and Fort Worth; three in a row producing a reminiscence of the three crosses in the Crucifixion of Jesus.

== History ==
Moore described how the original idea came from a commission for an Olivetti building in Milan, where he "visited the site and a lone Lombardy poplar growing behind the building convinced me that a vertical work would act as the correct counterfoil to the horizontal rhythm of the building. This idea grew ultimately into the 'Upright Motifs'." Between 1951 and 1976, Sir William Keswick, who owned the Glenkiln estate, bought and arranged works by Henry Moore, Jacob Epstein, and Auguste Rodin, creating the world's first collection of sculpture in a landscape setting, Glenkiln Sculpture Park. Moore and Keswick installed the first cast of the cross on a hilltop, where they saw a shepherd and his flock; Moore said "From a distance it looks rather like one of the old Celtic crosses."

== Gallery ==
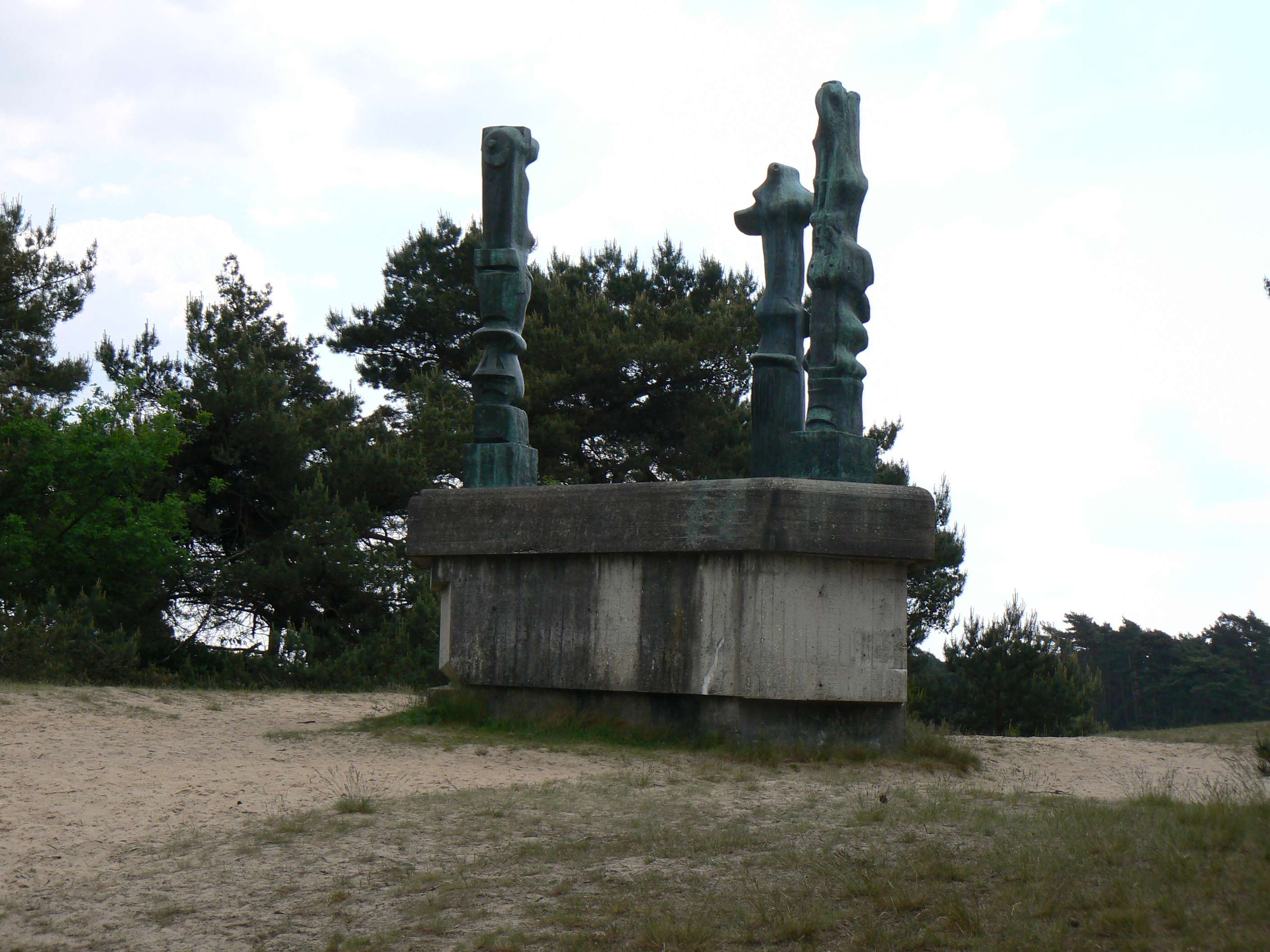
Three of the Upright Motives in Otterlo; No. 1 in the middle

Left side, Washington

Right side, Washington

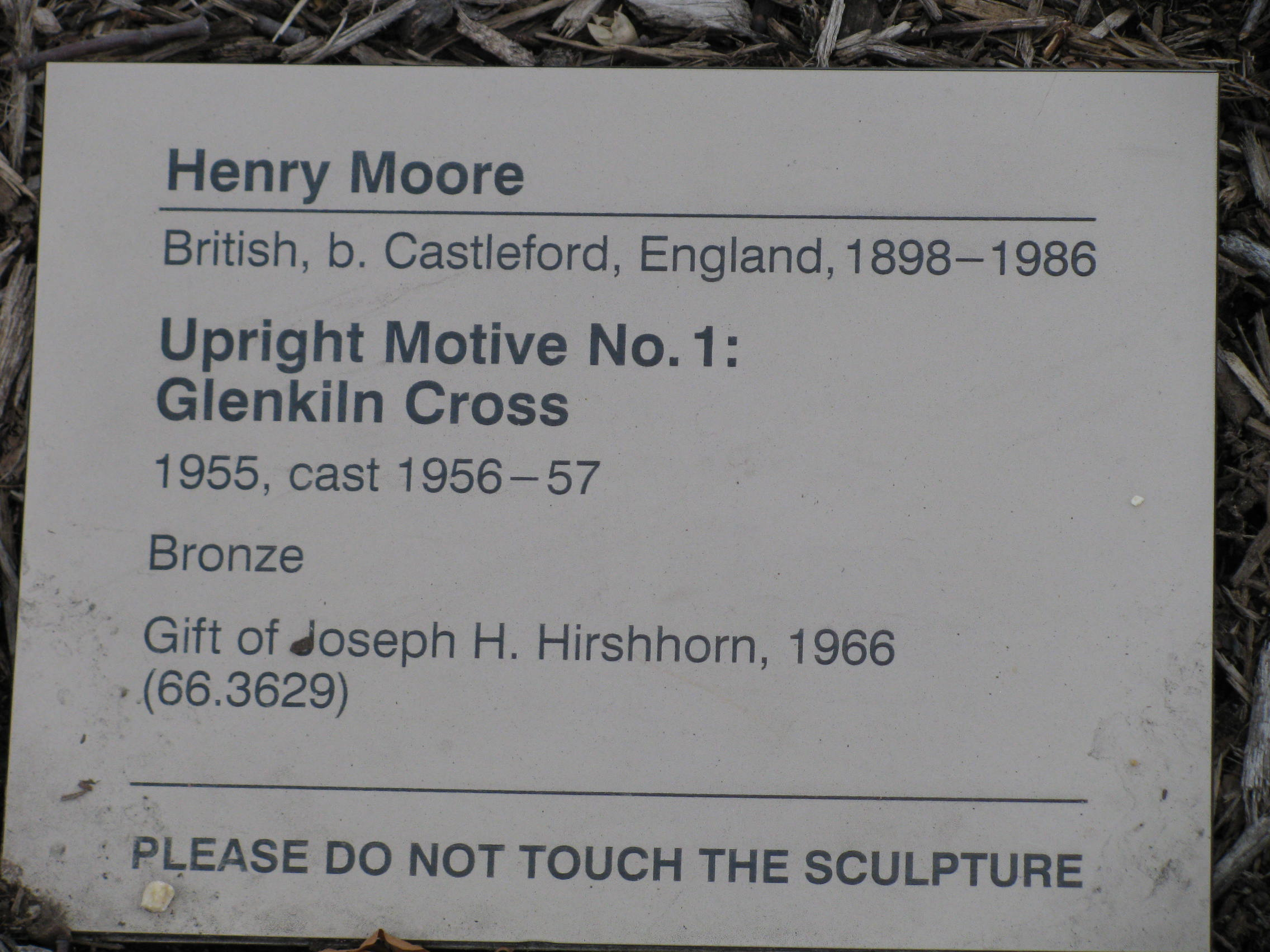
title card in Washington

== See also ==
- List of sculptures by Henry Moore
- List of public art in Washington, D.C., Ward 2
