= Geoffrey Ireland =

British photographer (1923–2016)

Thomas "Geoffrey" Ireland (4 April 1923 – 19 July 2016) was a British photographer and writer. He studied at the Lancaster School of Art under Ronald Grimshaw and then at the Royal College of Art, where in 1953 he was appointed the tutor for graphic design. He later became Head of Photography at the Central School of Art and Design. He died on 19 July 2016.

His photographic work included studies of many sculptors such as Jacob Epstein held in the National Portrait Gallery and his works are also included in the Tate collections.
