= Cubi XV =

Sculpture by David Smith

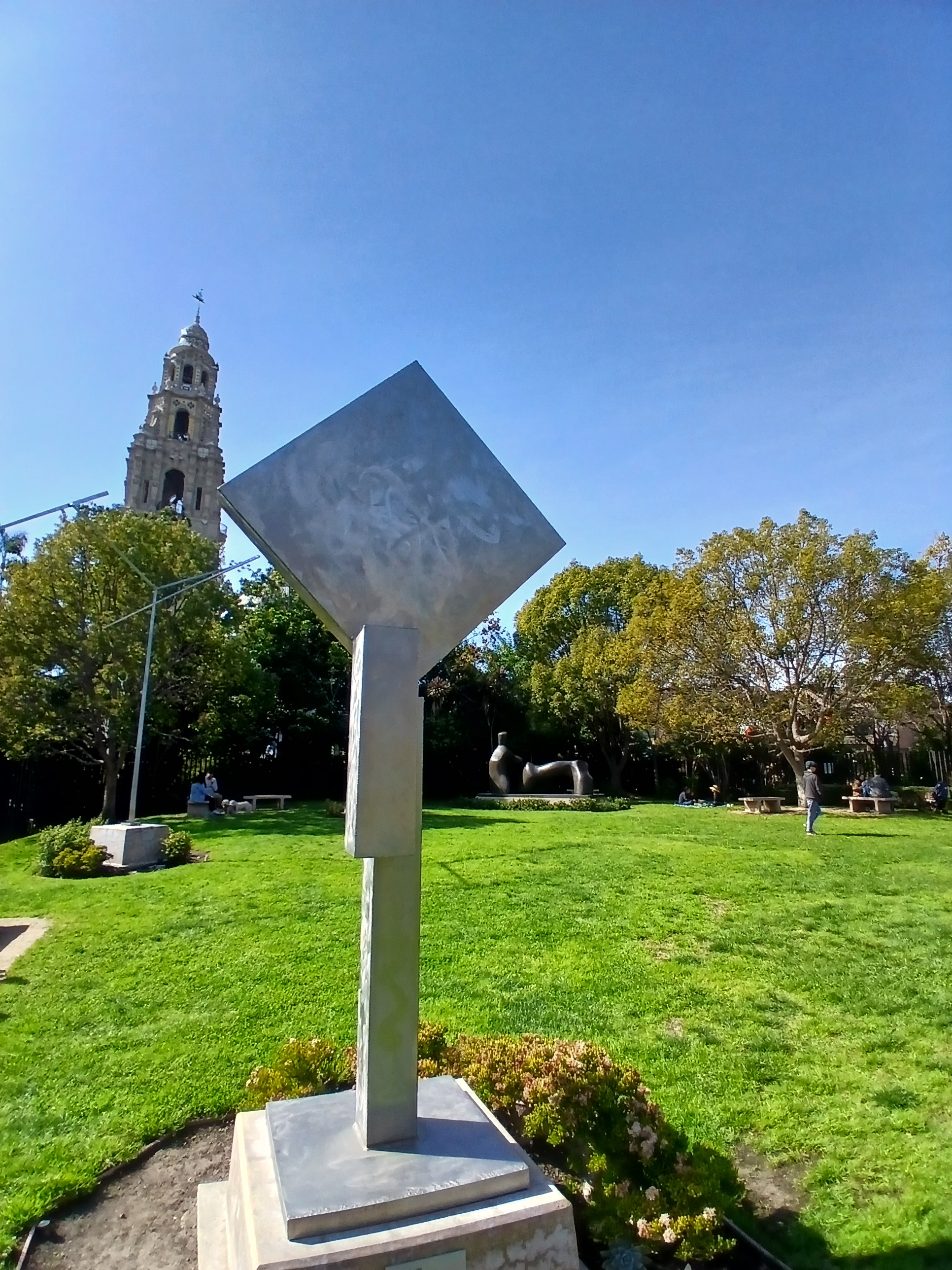
- Artist: David Smith
- Completion date: circa 1963-64
- Medium: Stainless steel sculpture
- Location: San Diego Museum of Art, May S. Marcy Sculpture Court & Garden, San Diego, California, U.S.; 32°43′54.2″N 117°9′5.3″W

Cubi XV is an abstract stainless steel sculpture by David Smith. It is part of collection of the San Diego Museum of Art, and installed in Balboa Park's May S. Marcy Sculpture Garden. The statue is part of Smith's Cubi series.

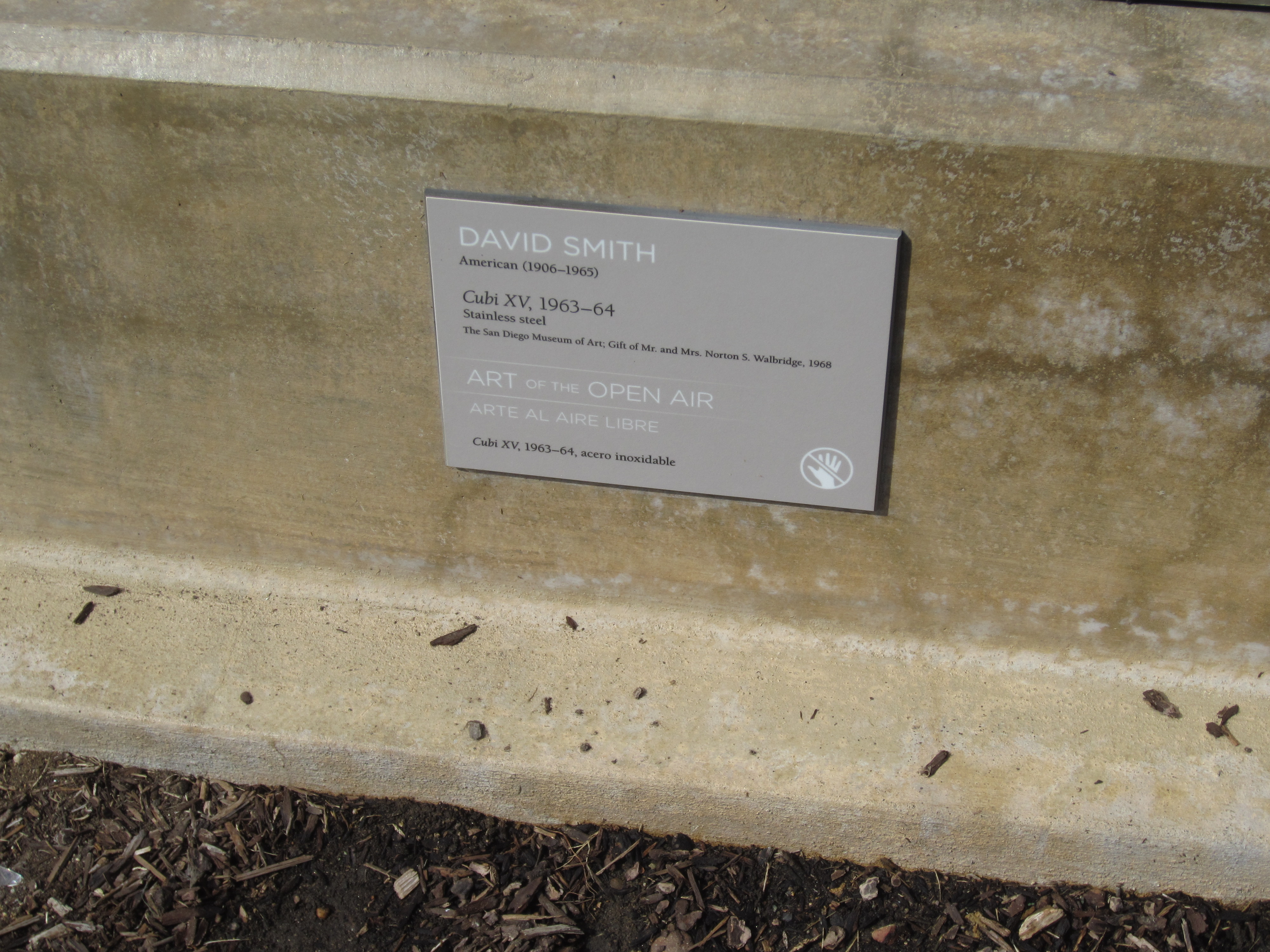
