= Cubi VII =

Sculpture by David Smith

- View facing west in Art Institute of Chicago North Garden

- Location in Chicago
- Artist: David Smith
- Year: 1963
- Type: Stainless Steel
- Location: Art Institute of Chicago (outdoor), Chicago, Illinois; 41.88059°N 87.62394°W

Cubi VII is a sculpture by David Smith in the Art Institute of Chicago North Stanley McCormick Memorial Court (a.k.a. North Garden) north of the Art Institute of Chicago Building in the Loop community area of Chicago, Illinois.

It is a stainless steel work of art created in 1963 and part of the Cubi series of stainless steel works housed around the world.

== See also ==
- List of public art in Chicago
