= Agricola I =

Sculpture by David Smith

- Artist: David Smith
- Year: 1952
- Type: Painted steel
- Dimensions: 1.87 m × 1.4 m × 0.61 m (6.15 ft × 4.6 ft × 2 ft)
- Location: Hirshhorn Museum and Sculpture Garden; Washington, D.C.; 38.889167°N 77.023056°W
- Owner: Hirshhorn Museum

Agricola I is a 1952 abstract sculpture by American artist David Smith. The artwork is located on the grounds at and in the collection of the Hirshhorn Museum and Sculpture Garden in Washington, D.C., United States. The word "agricola" means "farmer" in Latin. This work is the first in the Agricola series by Smith.

== Description ==
Agricola I is a painted steel sculpture made of old farm machinery which have been assembled to appear as a farmer holding a tool in each hand.

== Acquisition ==
The sculpture was originally purchased in 1962 from Park International in New York City. In 1966 the Hirshhorn Museum's namesake, Joseph H. Hirshhorn gave the work to the museum.

== Further information ==
The Agricola series includes other works utilizing old farm equipment. The series of sixteen sculptures, made between 1950 and 1957, represent Smith's concern with farming in upper New York State where he lived.

=== Mercury ===
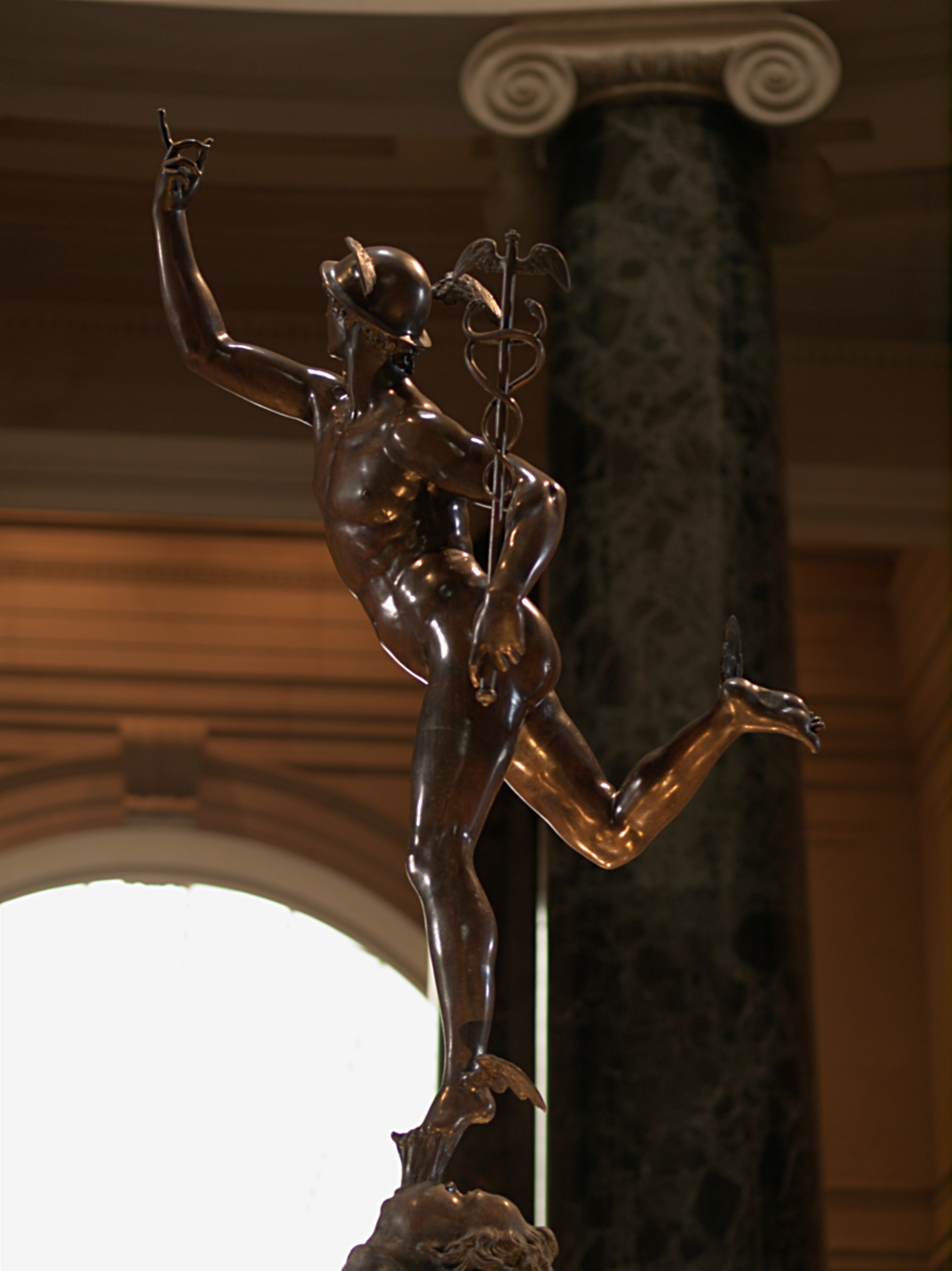
Mercury in the collection of the National Gallery of Art

The sculpture has been described by curators at the National Gallery of Art as "making a direct reference" to Mercury as attributed to Adrian de Vries and "that this Mercury variation is not an isolated instance in Smith's career," referring to other works such as Circles, Wagons and Sentinels by Smith, which are all variations upon work by another artist. Deemed a "parody" by The Washington Post, in the catalog of the National Gallery's 1982-1983 exhibition, "David Smith," Agricola is renamed "Mercury variant" for the duration of the publication. In 1982, NGA curator E.A. Carmean Jr., stated that the Hirshhorn's Agricola I was a must have for NGA if the work was ever to be deaccessioned. Art historian and critic Rosalind Krauss describes Agricola I as being "a hieratic image, rigid, frontal, and planar to the point of existing almost solely as a silhouette; whereas Mercury is a Mannerist work of combined elegance and muscularity..." She also points out that Mercury has nothing to do with the agricultural theme of Agricola I.

=== Reception ===
Art historian Sam Hunter described the Agricola series as "an abrasive, unadorned art brut of laconic gesture, almost no discernible style, and yet of an extraordinary lyric intensity." The Independent stated that the Agricola series depicts "primitive figures seem on their way to work the land, but it is hard to tell where the farmers end and where their tools begin." In a 1982 review of the National Gallery exhibition, The New York Times called the Agricola series "elegantly wrought" and as "giving everyday forms a metaphorical unity,"

== Exhibition history ==
- David Smith, 1982–1983, National Gallery of Art, Washington, D.C.
- Sculpture from Washington Collections, 1996–1997, White House, Washington, D.C.

== See also ==
- List of public art in Washington, D.C., Ward 2
