= Geoffrey Clarke =

British sculptor (1924–2014)

Geoffrey Cyril Petts Clarke RA (28 November 1924 – 30 October 2014) was a British sculptor of ecclesiastical art and maker of stained glass.

== Life and work ==
Clarke was a student of Ronald Grimshaw and attended the Royal College of Art in 1948 after serving in the RAF. He received the silver medal at the Milan Triennale for a collaboration with the furniture designer, Robin Day. He was part of a group of artists including Lynn Chadwick, Reg Butler and Kenneth Armitage who in 1952 was exhibited in the British Pavilion at the Venice Biennale. They were described by art critic Herbert Read as "the geometry of fear sculptors". He was commissioned to create the cross of nails for Coventry Cathedral and also worked on three of the nave windows between 1957 and 1962. In 1965 he had a retrospective at The Redfern Gallery, London and his work is also held at the Tate Gallery. Clarke was made a Royal Academician in 1975.

He was the subject of the Shell Film Unit film Cast in a New Mould.

== Illustrations of works ==
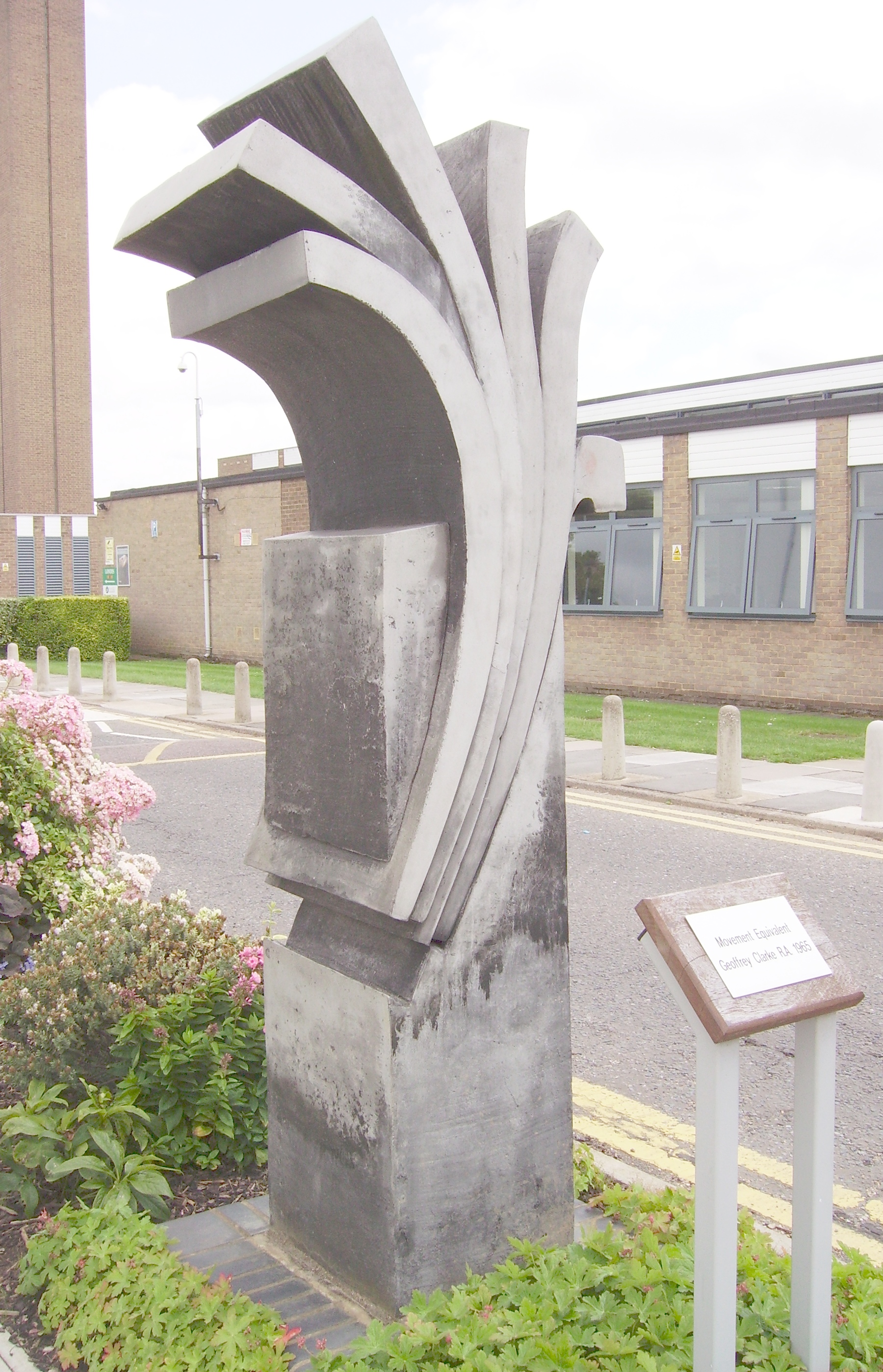
Movement Equivalent On display on the Bedford campus of the University of Bedfordshire.

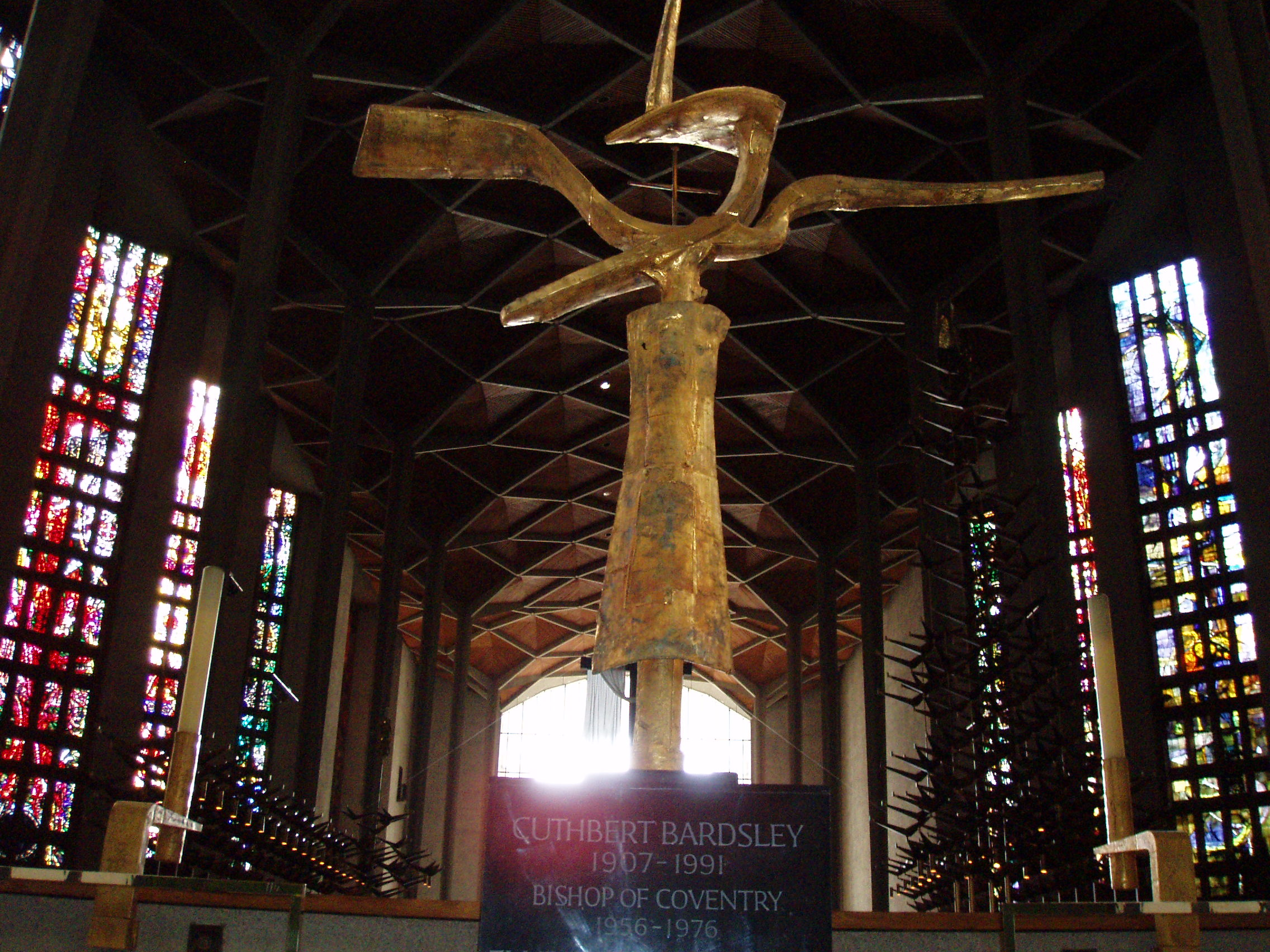
Cuthbert Bardsley Cross at Coventry Cathedral, 1962.

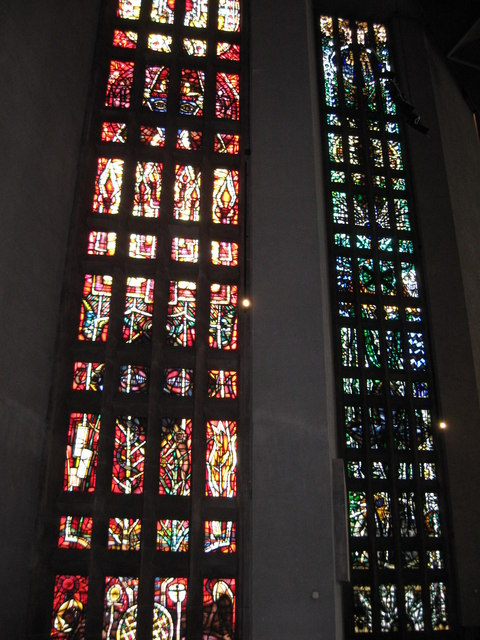
Stained-glass windows at Coventry Cathedral.

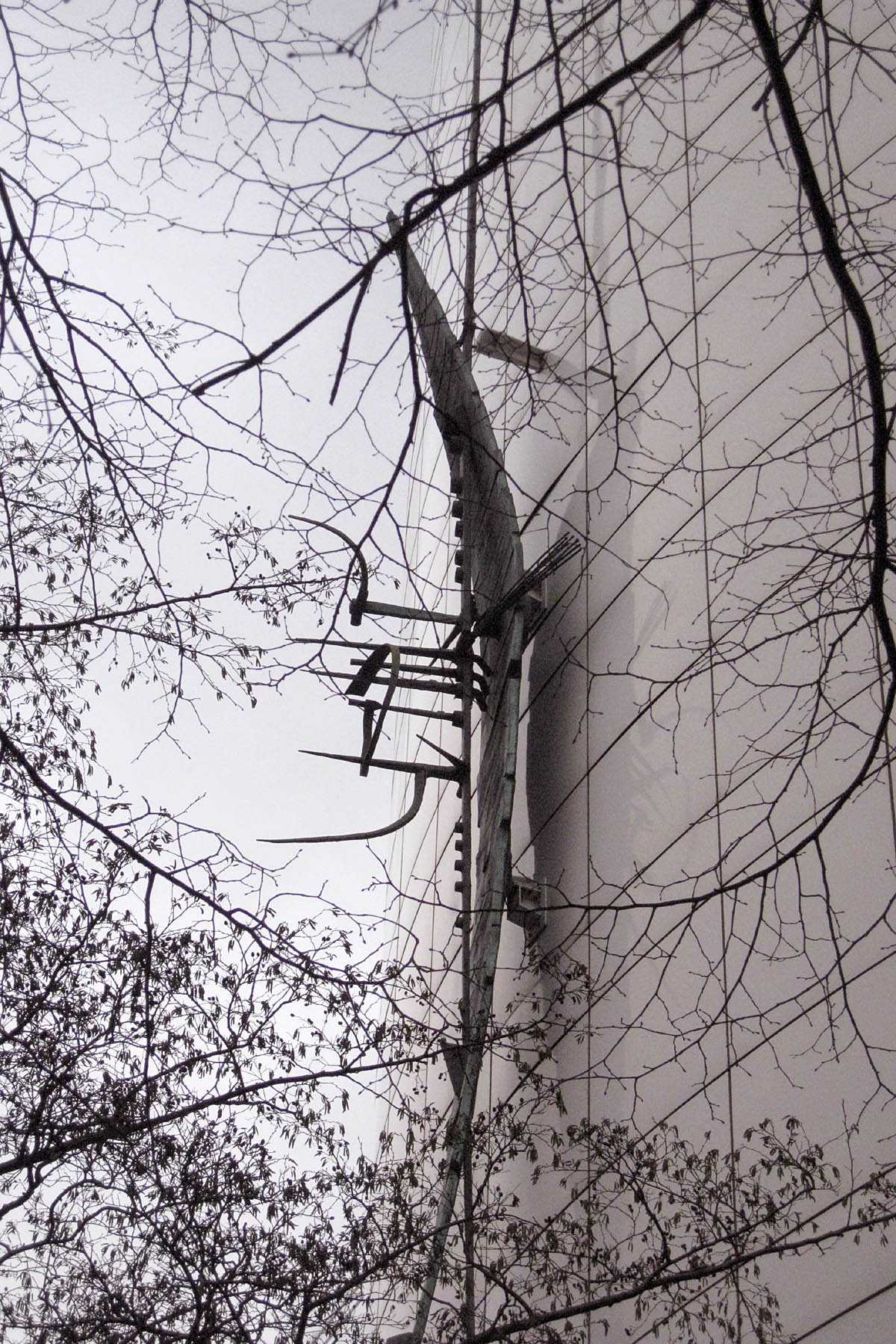
Orion House (formerly Thorn House), St Martin's Lane, London. 1960.

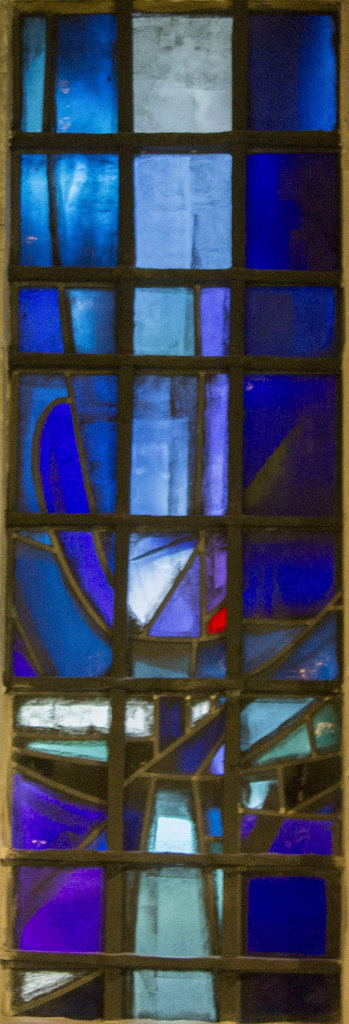
Lincoln Cathedral stained-glass window

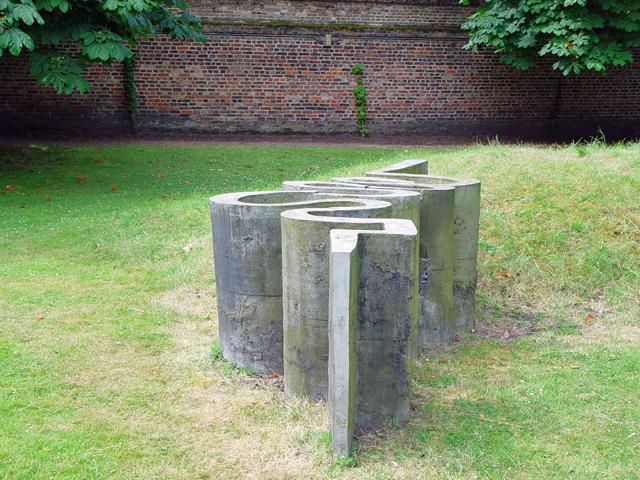
A Snake In The Orchard, Jesus College, Cambridge

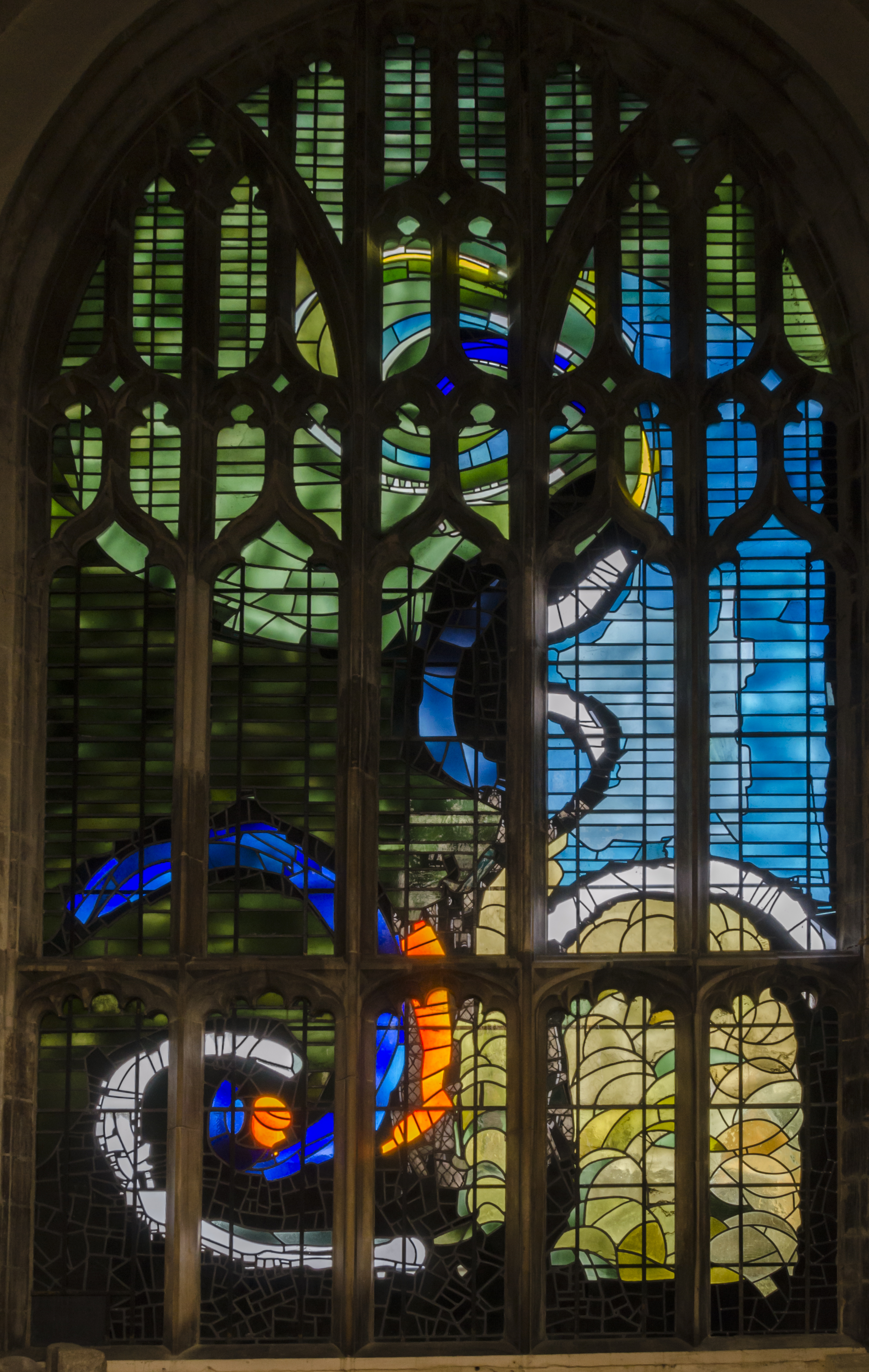
Stained-glass window at King's Lynn Minster, Norfolk.

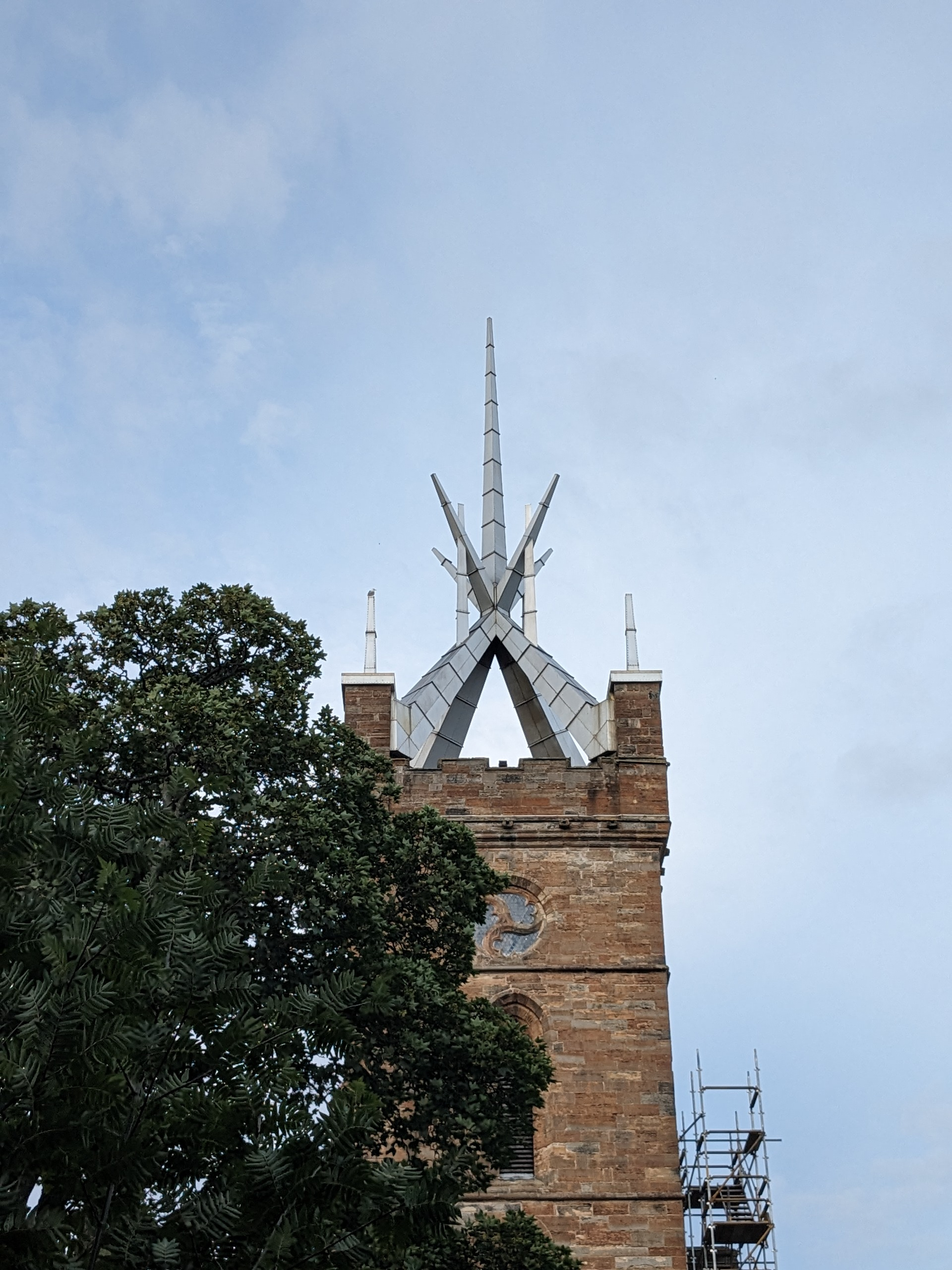
The Crown of Thorns spire, St Michael's Parish Church, Linlithgow, 1964

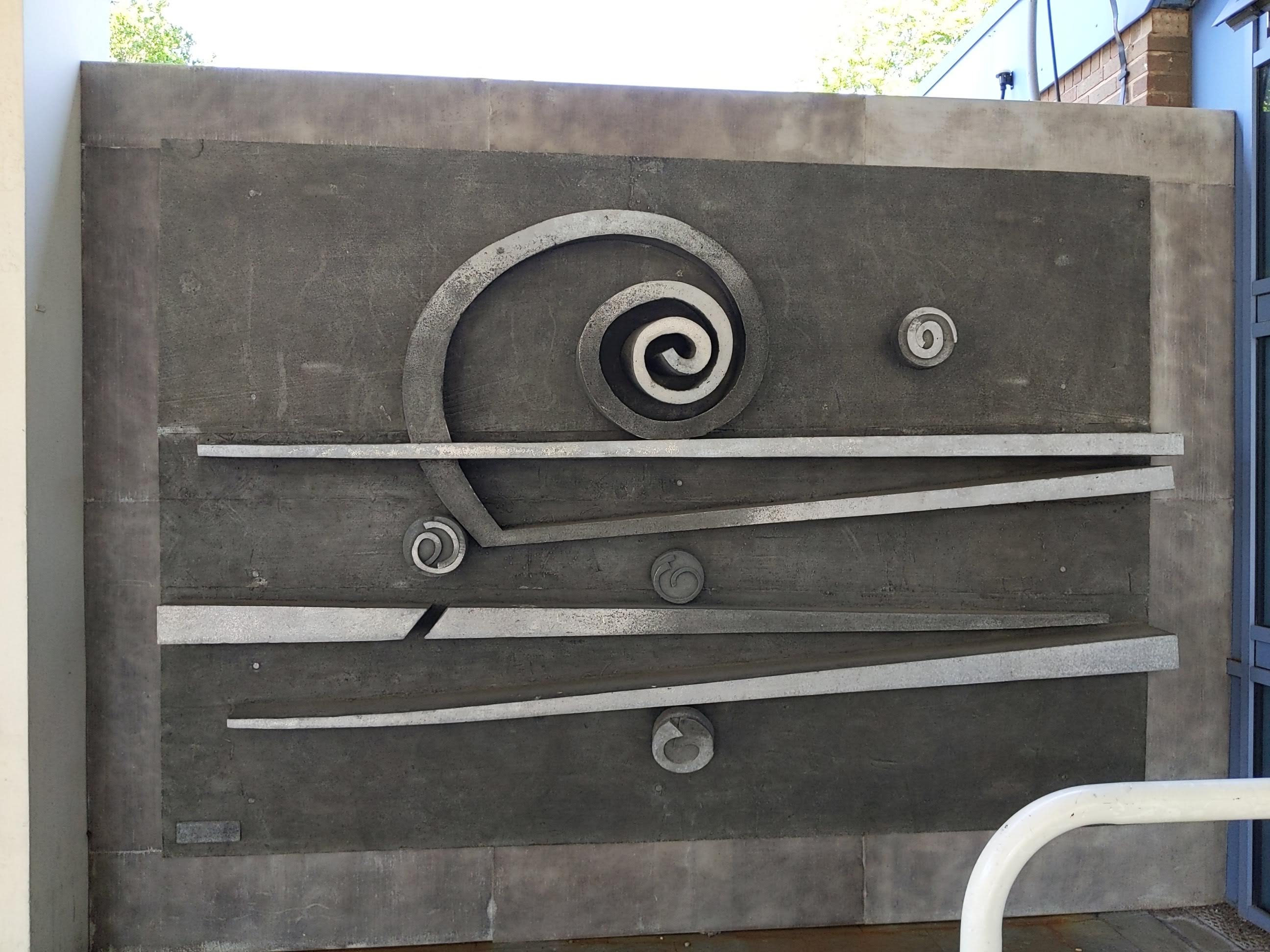
Relief (‘Bubble Chamber Tracks’), University of Liverpool, 1968
