= Tobias Meyer =

German-Austrian art dealer and auctioneer (born 1963)

- Born: 1962 or 1963 (age 62–63) near Frankfurt, Germany
- Education: University of Vienna
- Occupation: Art dealer
- Spouse: Mark Fletcher

Tobias Meyer (born 1962/1963) is a German-born, New York-based art dealer.

== Early life ==
Meyer was born near Frankfurt, Germany, and earned a degree from the University of Vienna in 1988.

== Career ==
Meyer started work for Christie's in London as a junior cataloguer. He joined Sotheby's in 1992 running its contemporary art department in London. He was Sotheby's chief auctioneer and worldwide head of contemporary art from 1997 until his departure in November 2013.

In 2014, The Guardian named him in their "Movers and makers: the most powerful people in the art world".

In 2016, Meyer became a member of the visiting committee for European Sculpture and Decorative Arts of The Metropolitan Museum of Art, New York.

In October 2017, The New York Times reported that Meyer has been named sole representative of and advisor to the family of the late publishing magnate Samuel Irving Newhouse Jr. on all matters relating to his art collection.

== Personal life ==
In 2011, he married art advisor Mark Fletcher, and they live in New York City and New Milford, Connecticut. Their weekend house in New Milford sits on a 54-acre site and was designed by Daniel Libeskind.
