= Corno (artist) =

Canadian artist

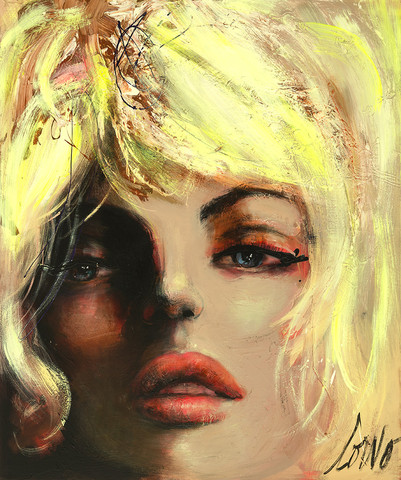
Blond Face, Corno, 72 by 60 inches (180 cm × 150 cm)

Joanne Corneau (22 November 1952 – 21 December 2016), better known by the pseudonym Corno, was a Canadian artist from the Saguenay region of Quebec. She achieved international recognition for her large-scale paintings of women's faces and bodies in a "post-pop" style.

== Early life ==
Corno was born in Chicoutimi, Canada, and enjoyed drawing and sketching from a young age. She moved to Montreal in the early 1970s and studied for a Bachelor's degree of Fine Arts at the Université du Québec à Montréal.

== Career ==
Corno held her first exhibition at the Clarence Gagnon Gallery in Montreal and also exhibited in Toronto, Calgary, Ottawa and Vancouver. In 1986, she presented her work at the Quebec Pavilion at Expo 86 in Vancouver. During this period she was represented by the Yves Laroche Gallery in Montreal.

In the 1980s, Corno moved to the United States, exhibiting at the Morgan Gallery in Boston and the University of San Diego. In 1991, she settled in New York, with few contacts and limited English language skills. Her works were initially hung in a friend's hairdressing salon until her work was noticed and she was invited to join group exhibitions; she was also selected as the featured artist at the Steuben Glass Gallery. In the late 1990s Corno was invited to join the Opera Gallery, a network of several contemporary art galleries located worldwide. As a result, her work was shown in New York, London, Paris, Venice, Monaco, Hong Kong, Singapore, Seoul and Dubai.

Corno participated in the Massive Media Techno-Graffiti Event in New York in 2005. Her works were projected onto the façades of buildings on Columbus Circle and Union Square. She was also interviewed for the documentary The Art of the Nude, which premiered at the International Festival of Films on Art. It later aired on Bravo!, Art-TV, France 5 and CBC Television. In the same year, Corno was the featured artist at the international fashion event "The Train", which catered to fashionistas, designers, diplomats, curators and celebrities. She created a 45-foot (14 m) mural for the event.

In 2006, Corno opened her own art gallery in Montreal, AKA Gallery, representing her work exclusively. Earlier that year, she was Cirque du Soleil's guest artist at the premiere of Alegria in London's Royal Albert Hall. Her paintings were exhibited in the VIP room and in the Roof Gardens. Other works were exhibited at London's Opera Gallery. During that same year, Corno took part in two other exhibitions: one at Left Coast Gallery in Los Angeles and the other at Hong Kong's Opera Gallery. The following year, Corno was the guest of honour at the launching of the Fido Spot in Toronto. Her works were projected onto the largest state of the art outdoor digital projector system in Canada. In June, her work was featured at Luminato Festival, Toronto's Festival of Arts and Creativity. She also began exhibiting her works at the Thompson Landry Gallery of Toronto.

Several shows took place in 2008 at Opera Galleries in Hong Kong, New York and Paris. She also took part in a group exhibition titled "Made in NY". The year after, Corno exhibited at Singapore's Opera Gallery followed by her first solo exhibition at Dubai's Opera Gallery. During this period, she was also chosen as the Invited Artist by the International Jazz Festival of Montreal. As the festival celebrated its 30th anniversary, which coincided with the 30th anniversary of Corno's artistic career, she created a painting Face For Jazz which was unveiled in mid-June at the opening of the festival's new art gallery in Montreal. Corno published a book, Cornographie (2010), an account of her arrival and life in New York City and a documentary, Corno (2012), was made about her and her work. In 2015, Corno participated in a fund-raising event for Maisonneuve-Rosemont Hospital in which she painted male nudes in front of an audience.

== Style and influences ==
Corno painted large-scale works of female faces and bodies; her style was considered "post-pop" and neo-expressionist, showing similarities to the work of Andy Warhol. She harmonized abstract with figurative and used bold textures, movement and colors. Corno stated that she was inspired by artists Renoir, Toulouse-Lautrec and Julian Schnabel and also by the variety of art she experienced in daily life, such as food, music, photography, cinema, billboards and travel.

== Death ==
In 2016, Corno travelled to Mexico to seek medical treatment for throat cancer. She died there on 21 December 2016.
