= On the Contrary =

1952 painting by Kay Sage

- Artist: Kay Sage
- Year: 1952
- Medium: Oil on canvas
- Dimensions: 90.2 cm × 70.5 cm (35 1/2 in × 27 3/4 in)
- Location: Walker Art Center; Minneapolis, Minnesota

On The Contrary is an oil on canvas painting by Kay Sage, painted in 1952. It is housed in the Walker Art Center in Minneapolis, Minnesota.
