= Darryl Pottorf =

American artist (born 1952)

- Born: 1952 (age 73–74); Cincinnati, Ohio, united States
- Known for: Painting sculpture
- Website: Official website

Darryl Pottorf (born July 16, 1952, in Cincinnati, Ohio) is an American visual artist.

He grew up in the suburbs of Cincinnati. He studied art, dance, and art history at the University of South Florida from which he received a BA. Pottorf then studied in Florence, Italy for four years through a special program organized by Florida State University. During this period he also worked as a research assistant to Fred Licht for his book Goya and The Modern Tradition and participated in an archeological dig concentrated upon Etruscan artifacts.

Pottorf who was at first Robert Rauschenberg's studio assistant, became for the last twenty-five years of the assemblage practitioner, guiding light of neo-dada, Pop art precursor's life-partner as well as his sometimes artistic collaborator. He also owned a print company with Rauschenberg.

From March 13 until May 18, 2008, Pottorf's work was the subject of a solo exhibition at the Institut Valencià d'Art Modern (IVAN), curated by Barbara Rose and Consuelo Cisar, in Valencia, Spain. From April 8 to July 15, 2017, Potorff's work was on view in the solo exhibition "Unerased Journeys: A Survey of Works by Darryl Pottorf" at the Museum of Outdoor Arts in Englewood, Colorado. In June 2026 a solo exhibition of his work was mounted at Stirner Modern in Easton, Pennsylvania.

Pottorf's work is included in the permanent collection of the National Gallery of Art in Washington DC.
