= David Smith (sculptor) =

American sculptor and painter

- Born: Roland David Smith; March 9, 1906; Decatur, Indiana, US
- Died: May 23, 1965 (aged 59); South Shaftsbury, Vermont, US
- Known for: Sculpture
- Notable work: Helmholtzian Landscape (1946); Hudson River Landscape (1951); Tanktotem I (1952); Agricola V (1952); Voltri VI (1962); Cubi VI (1963)
- Movement: Abstract expressionism, Modernist

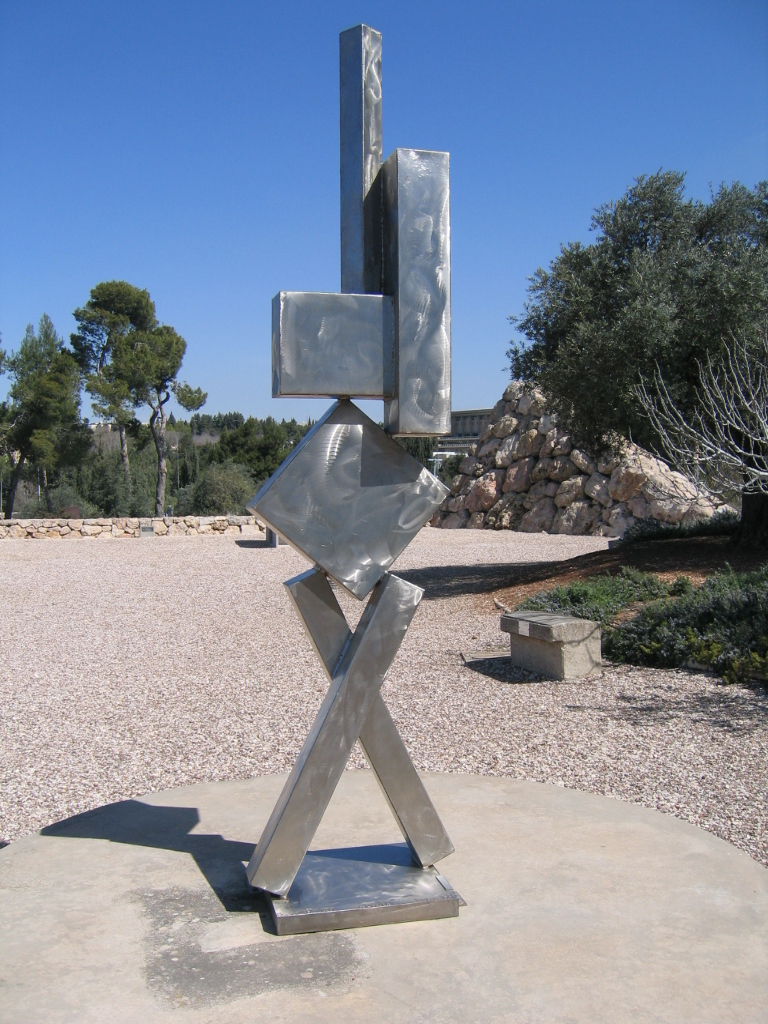
CUBI VI (1963), Israel Museum, Jerusalem

Roland David Smith (March 9, 1906 – May 23, 1965) was an American abstract expressionist sculptor and painter, best known for creating large steel abstract geometric sculptures.

== Early life ==
Roland David Smith was born on March 9, 1906, in Decatur, Indiana, and moved to Paulding, Ohio, in 1921, where he attended high school. His mother was a school teacher and a devout Methodist; his father was a telephone engineer and part-time inventor, who fostered a reverence for machinery in Smith.

From 1924 to 1925, he attended Ohio University in Athens (one year) and the University of Notre Dame, which he left after two weeks because there were no art courses. In between, Smith took a summer job working on the assembly line of the Studebaker automobile factory in South Bend, Indiana. He then briefly studied art and poetry at George Washington University in Washington, D.C.

Moving to New York in 1926, he met Dorothy Dehner (to whom he was married from 1927 to 1952) and, on her advice, joined her painting studies at the Art Students League of New York. Among his teachers were the American painter John Sloan and the Czech modernist painter Jan Matulka, who had studied with Hans Hofmann. Matulka introduced Smith to the work of Picasso, Mondrian, Kandinsky, and the Russian Constructivists. In 1929, Smith met John D. Graham, who later introduced him to the welded-steel sculpture of Pablo Picasso and Julio González.

== History ==
=== Early work ===
Smith's early friendship with painters such as Adolph Gottlieb and Milton Avery was reinforced during the Depression of the 1930s, when he participated in the Works Progress Administration's Federal Art Project in New York. Through the Russian émigré artist John D. Graham, Smith met avant-garde artists such as Stuart Davis, Arshile Gorky and Willem de Kooning. He also discovered the welded sculptures of Julio González and Picasso, which led to an increasing interest in combining painting and construction.

In the Virgin Islands in 1931–32, Smith made his first sculpture from pieces of coral. In 1932, he installed a forge and anvil in his studio at the farm in Bolton Landing that he and Dehner had bought a few years earlier. Smith started by making three-dimensional objects from wood, wire, coral, soldered metal and other found materials but soon graduated to using an oxyacetylene torch to weld metal heads, which are probably the first welded metal sculptures ever made in the United States. A single work may consist of several materials, differentiated by varied patinas and polychromy.

Early Smith: Ancient Household of 1945, bronze, in the Hirshhorn Museum and Sculpture Garden

In 1940, the Smiths distanced themselves from the New York art scene and moved permanently to Bolton Landing near Lake George in Upstate New York. At Bolton Landing, he ran his studio like a factory, stocked with large amounts of raw material. The artist would put his sculptures in what is referred to as an upper and lower field, and sometimes he would put them in rows, "as if they were farm crops".

During World War II, Smith worked as a welder for the American Locomotive Company, Schenectady, NY assembling locomotives and M7 tanks. He taught at Sarah Lawrence College.

=== After 1945 ===
After the war, with the additional skills that he had acquired, Smith released his pent-up energy and ideas in a burst of creation between 1945 and 1946. His output soared and he went about perfecting his own, very personal symbolism.

Traditionally, metal sculpture meant bronze casts, which artisans produced using a mold made by the artist. Smith, however, made his sculptures from scratch, welding together pieces of steel and other metals with his torch, in much the same way that a painter applied paint to a canvas; his sculptures are almost always unique works.

Smith, who often said, "I belong with the painters", made sculptures of subjects that had never before been shown in three dimensions. He made sculptural landscapes (e.g. Hudson River Landscape), still life sculptures (e.g. Head as Still Life) and even a sculpture of a page of writing (The Letter). Perhaps his most revolutionary concept was that the only difference between painting and sculpture was the addition of a third dimension; he declared that the sculptor's "conception is as free as a that of the painter. His wealth of response is as great as his draftsmanship."

Smith was awarded the prestigious Guggenheim Fellowship in 1950, which was renewed the following year. Freed from financial constraints, he made more and larger pieces, and for the first time was able to afford to make whole sculptures in stainless steel. He also began his practice of making sculptures in series, the first of which were the Agricolas of 1951–59. He steadily gained recognition, lecturing at universities and participating in symposia. He separated from Dehner in 1950, with divorce in 1952. During his time as a visiting artist at Indiana University, Bloomington, in 1955 and 1956, Smith produced the Forgings, a series of eleven industrially forged steel sculptures. To create the Forgings, he cut, plugged, flattened, pinched and bent each steel bar, later polishing, rusting, painting, lacquering or waxing its surface.

Beginning in the mid-1950s, Smith explored the technique of burnishing his stainless steel sculptures with a sander, a technique that would find its fullest expression in his Cubi series (1961–65). The scale of his works continued to increase – Tanktotem III of 1953 is 7' tall; Zig I from 1961 is 8'; and 5 Ciarcs from 1963 is almost 13' tall. Finally, in the late 1950s Smith began using spray paint – then still a new medium – to create stenciled shapes out of negative space, in works closely tied to his late-career turn toward geometric planes and solids.

His family was also getting bigger; he remarried and had two daughters, Rebecca (born 1954) and Candida (born 1955). He named quite a few of his later works in honor of his children (e.g., Bec-Dida Day, 1963, Rebecca Circle, 1961, Hi Candida, 1965).

The February 1960 issue of Arts magazine was devoted to Smith's work; later that year he had his first West Coast exhibition, a solo show at the Everett Ellin Gallery in Los Angeles. The following year he rejected a third-place award at the Carnegie International, saying "the awards system in our day is archaic".

In 1962, Gian Carlo Menotti invited Smith to make sculptures for the Festival dei Due Mondi in Spoleto. Given open access to an abandoned steel mill and provided with a group of assistants, he produced an amazing 27 pieces in 30 days. Not yet finished with the themes he developed, he had tons of steel shipped from Italy to Bolton Landing, and over the next 18 months he made another 25 sculptures known as the Voltri-Bolton series.

== Works ==
=== Major works ===
==== Cubi series ====
Between 1961 and 1965 Smith produced the Cubi series of 28 stainless-steel sculptures. The series was his last and remains his best known.

In 2005, Cubi XXVIII was sold to Los Angeles philanthropist Eli Broad at Sotheby's for $23.8 million, breaking a record for the most expensive piece of contemporary art ever sold at auction.

=== Paintings and drawings ===
Untitled (Green Linear Nude) by David Smith, c. 1964, Honolulu Museum of Art

Even though he's primarily known as a sculptor, Smith painted and drew throughout his life. By 1953, he was producing between 300 and 400 drawings a year. His subjects encompassed the figure and landscape, as well as gestural, almost calligraphic marks made with egg yolk, Chinese ink and brushes and, in the late 1950s, the "sprays". He usually signed his drawings with the ancient Greek letters delta and sigma, meant to stand for his initials. In the winter of 1963–64, he began a series known as the "Last Nudes". The paintings in this series are essentially drawings of nudes on canvas. He drew with enamel paint squeezed from syringes or bottles onto a canvas spread onto the floor. Untitled (Green Linear Nude) is painted in a metallic olive green enamel, and exemplifies the artist's late action paintings.

==== Other works ====
Prior to the Cubis, Smith gained widespread attention for his sculptures often described as "drawings in space". He was originally trained as a painter and draftsman, and sculptures such as Hudson River Landscape (1950) and The Letter (both 1950) blurred the distinctions between sculpture and painting. These works make use of delicate tracery rather than solid form, with a two-dimensional appearance that contradicts the traditional idea of sculpture in the round.

As with many artists from the Modernist period, including Jackson Pollock and Mark Rothko, much of Smith's early work was heavily influenced by Surrealism. Some of the best examples are seen in the Medals for Dishonor, a series of bronze reliefs that speak out against the atrocities of war. Images from these medals are strange, nightmarish, and often violent. His own descriptions give a vivid picture of the medals and strongly express condemnation of these acts, such as this statement about Propaganda for War (1939–40):

The rape of the mind by machines of death – the Hand of God points to atrocities. Atop the curly bull the red cross nurse blows the clarinet. The horse is dead in this bullfight arena – the bull is docile, can be ridden.

== Gallery of works ==
Image	Title	Year	Material
	Widow's Lament	1942–43	Bronze, steel; wood base, paint
	Home of the Welder	1945	Steel, bronze
	Big Diamond	1952	Steel, paint
	Voltri XV	1962	Steel
	Saw Head	1963	Cast iron, steel, bronze, paint
	Cubi XII	1963	Stainless steel
	Cubi XIII	1963	Stainless steel
	Cubi XV	1963	Stainless steel
	Cubi XI	1963	Stainless Steel
	Cubi VII	1963	Stainless Steel
	Cubi XXVI	1965	Stainless Steel

== Acclaim ==
Smith was invited to lecture and to teach throughout much of his artistic career. Exhibitions of his work frequently received praise from the critical press. His sculpture Blue Construction was selected for exhibition at the 1939 New York World's Fair. In 1941, he was selected to participate in the Whitney Annual at the Whitney Museum of American Art. He was awarded the John Simon Guggenheim Memorial Fellowship in 1950 and again in 1951. His work was included in the United States' presentations at the first São Paulo Bienal in 1951 and at the fifth São Paulo Bienal in 1959, and at the Venice Biennale in 1954 and 1958. In 1954 he served as a delegate to UNESCO's First International Congress of Plastic Arts. Arts Magazine devoted a special issue to Smith in 1960. In 1961 the Carnegie International awarded Smith the third prize for sculpture, but Smith rejected it on the principle that museums should support artists through acquisitions rather than cash prizes. In 1962, Smith was invited to travel to Italy to make one or two sculptures for the Festival dei Due mondi di Spoleto; he instead made twenty-seven sculptures in one month. In 1964, Smith received the annual Brandeis Creative Arts Award and he was included in Documenta III in Kassel, Germany. In February 1965, President Lyndon B. Johnson appointed Smith to the first National Council on the Arts.

== Exhibitions ==
Smith's sculpture, paintings, and drawings have been featured in hundreds of monographic and group exhibitions around the world. His first public showing was in 1930 in the Print Club of Philadelphia's annual exhibition of block prints. His first one-person exhibition was held in 1938 at Marian Willard's East River Gallery. Smith's work has been included in numerous international fairs and exhibitions including the 1939 and 1964 New York World's Fairs; Documenta, the Festival dei Due Mondi in Spoleto, Italy; the São Paulo Art Biennal; and the Venice Biennale.

Following Smith's death in 1965, memorial exhibitions were organized by the Los Angeles County Museum of Art, Harvard University Art Museums, and The Museum of Modern Art. Retrospective exhibitions have been held at the Solomon R. Guggenheim Museum, Storm King Art Center, the Hirshhorn Museum and Sculpture Garden, the Contemporary Sculpture Center, Sezon Museum of Modern Art, Tokyo and other Japanese museums, and Yorkshire Sculpture Park. A traveling centennial exhibition was organized in 2006–07 at the Solomon R. Guggenheim Museum, the Centre Georges Pompidou, and Tate Modern.

=== Select solo exhibitions ===
- New York, East River Gallery. David Smith: Steel Sculpture. January 19 – February 5, 1938. Checklist.
- New York, Willard Gallery. Medals for Dishonor. November 5–23, 1940. Exhibition catalogue.
- New York, Buchholz Gallery and Willard Gallery. The Sculpture of David Smith. January 2–26, 1946. Exhibition catalogue.
- New York, Willard Gallery and Kleemann Galleries. David Smith: Sculpture and Drawing. April 1–26, 1952. Exhibition catalogue.
- New York, Kootz Gallery, in association with Willard Gallery. David Smith: New Sculpture. January 26 – February 14, 1953. Exhibition catalogue.
- New York, The Museum of Modern Art. David Smith. September 10 – October 20, 1957. Exhibition catalogue.
- New York, French & Company. David Smith: Paintings and Drawings. September 16 – October 10, 1959. Exhibition catalogue.
- New York, Fine Arts Associates. David Smith: Recent Sculpture. October 10–28, 1961. Exhibition catalogue.
- Pittsburgh, PA, Carnegie Institute, Department of Fine Arts. One-Man Exhibitions Honoring Seven Artists in the 1961 Pittsburgh International: David Smith. October 27, 1961 – January 7, 1962. Exhibition catalogue.
- New York, Marlborough-Gerson Gallery. David Smith. October 15 – November 16, 1964. Exhibition catalogue.
- Otterlo, The Netherlands, Rijksmuseum Kröller-Müller. David Smith: 1906–1965. May 15 – July 17, 1966. Organized by the International Council, The Museum of Modern Art, New York. Exhibition catalogue for all venues. Traveled to: London, Tate Gallery, August 18 – September 25, 1966; Basel, Switzerland, Kunsthalle, as David Smith: Skulpturen, October 25 – November 23, 1966; Nuremberg, Germany, Kunsthalle Nürnberg, as David Smith: Skulpturen, January 14 – February 20, 1967; Duisburg, Germany, Wilhelm-Lehmbruck-Museum, as David Smith: Skulpturen, April 15 – May 28, 1967.
- Cambridge, MA, Harvard University, Fogg Art Museum. David Smith 1906–1965: A Retrospective Exhibition. September 28 – November 15, 1966. Exhibition catalogue. Traveled to: Washington, DC, Washington Gallery of Modern Art, January 6 – February 27, 1967.
- New York, Solomon R. Guggenheim Museum. David Smith. March 29 – May 11, 1969. Exhibition catalogue. Traveled to: Dallas, Dallas Museum of Fine Arts, June 25 – September 1, 1969; Washington, DC, Corcoran Gallery, October 17 – December 7, 1969.
- Stuttgart, West Germany, Staatsgalerie Stuttgart. David Smith: Zeichnungen. January 31 – February 29, 1976. Exhibition catalogue. Traveled to: Berlin, Nationalgalerie Berlin, Staatliche Museen Preussischer Kulturbesitz, March 16 – May 2, 1976; Duisburg, West Germany, Wilhelm-Lehmbruck-Museum der Stadt Duisburg, August 28–(date unknown), 1976.
- Mountainville, NY, Storm King Art Center. David Smith Exhibition. May 12 – October 31, 1976. Exhibition catalogue.
- New York, Whitney Museum of American Art. David Smith: The Drawings. December 4, 1979 – February 24, 1980. Exhibition catalogue. Traveled to: London, Serpentine Gallery, as Sculpture and Drawings, May 3 – June 8, 1980; Detroit, Detroit Institute of Arts, February 1 – March 15, 1981; Berkeley, CA, University of California, Berkeley Art Museum, September 9 – November 1, 1981.
- Washington, DC, Hirshhorn Museum and Sculpture Garden. David Smith: Painter, Sculptor, Draftsman. November 4, 1982 – January 2, 1983. Exhibition catalogue. Traveled to: San Antonio, TX, San Antonio Museum of Art, March 27 – June 4, 1983.
- Washington, DC, National Gallery of Art. David Smith: Seven Major Themes. November 7, 1982 – April 24, 1983. Exhibition catalogue.
- Düsseldorf, Kunstsammlung Nordrhein-Westfalen. David Smith: Skulpturen, Zeichnungen. March 14 – April 27, 1986. Exhibition catalogue. Traveled to: Frankfurt, Städtische Galerie im Städelschen Kunstinstitut, June 19 – September 28, 1986; London, Whitechapel Art Gallery, November 7, 1986 – January 4, 1987.
- Tokyo, Sezon Museum of Art. David Smith. April 14 – May 30, 1994. Organized by the Sezon Museum of Art and the International Sculpture Center, Washington, DC. Exhibition catalogue. Traveled to: Shizuoka, Japan, Shizuoka Prefectural Museum of Art, June 7 – July 17, 1994; Shiga, Japan, Museum of Modern Art, July 26 – September 25, 1994; Sakura, Japan, Kawamura Memorial Museum of Art, October 5 – November 20, 1994.
- New York, Matthew Marks Gallery. David Smith: Medals for Dishonor, 1937–1940. November 29, 1994 – January 28, 1995. Checklist.
- Mountainville, NY, Storm King Art Center. The Fields of David Smith, Part I. May 19 – November 16, 1997. Exhibition catalogue. Part II, May 18 – November 15, 1998; Part III, May 17 – November 15, 1999.
- New York, Matthew Marks Gallery. David Smith: Photographs, 1931–1965. March 7 – April 8, 1998. Exhibition catalogue. Traveled to: San Francisco, Fraenkel Gallery, April 30 – May 17, 1998.
- New York, Metropolitan Museum of Art. David Smith on the Roof. May 16 – November 15, 2000.
- Paris, École Nationale Supérieure des Beaux-Arts. Dessins de David Smith: un choix d'Alain Kirili. March 18 – April 27, 2003. Exhibition catalogue.
- Valencia, Spain, Institut Valencià d'Art Modern, Centre Julio González. David Smith, Draughtsman. Between Eros and Thanatos. July 15 – September 26, 2004. Exhibition catalogue.
- New York, Solomon R. Guggenheim Museum. David Smith: A Centennial. February 3 – May 14, 2006. Exhibition catalogue. Traveled to: London, Tate Modern, November 1, 2006 – January 21, 2007.
- Los Angeles, Los Angeles County Museum of Art. David Smith: Cubes and Anarchy. April 3 – July 24, 2011. Exhibition catalogue. Traveled to: New York, Whitney Museum of American Art, October 6, 2011 – January 8, 2012; Columbus, OH, Wexner Center for the Arts, January 28 – April 15, 2012.
- Zurich, Galerie Gmurzynska. David Smith: Points of Power. June 9 – August 31, 2012. Exhibition catalogue.
- Williamstown, MA, Clark Art Institute. Raw Color: The Circles of David Smith. July 4 – October 19, 2014. Exhibition catalogue.
- Mountainville, NY, Storm King Art Center. David Smith: The White Sculptures. May 13 – November 12, 2017. Exhibition catalogue.
- New York, Hauser & Wirth. David Smith: Origins & Innovations. November 13 – December 23, 2017. Exhibition catalogue.
- Wakefield, UK, Yorkshire Sculpture Park. David Smith: Sculpture 1932–1965. June 22, 2019 – January 5, 2020. Exhibition catalogue.
- New York, Hauser & Wirth. No One Thing. David Smith, Late Sculptures. February 1 – April 13, 2024.
- Grand Rapids, MI, Frederik Meijer Gardens & Sculpture Park. David Smith: The Nature of Sculpture. September 23, 2024 – March 2, 2025. Exhibition catalogue.

== Death ==
Smith died in a car crash near Bennington, Vermont on May 23, 1965. He was 59 years old.

== Select publications ==
- Suzanne Ramljak, et al. David Smith: The Nature of Sculpture. Exh. cat. Grand Rapids: Frederik Meijer Gardens & Sculpture Park; Munich: Hirmer, 2024.
- Jennifer Field. Songs of the Horizon: David Smith, Music, and Dance. Exh. cat. Glens Falls, NY: The Hyde Collection, 2023.
- Michael Brenson. David Smith: The Art and Life of a Transformational Sculptor. New York: Farrar, Straus and Giroux, 2022.
- Christopher J. Lyon, ed., Susan J. Cooke, research ed. David Smith Sculpture: A Catalogue Raisonné, 1932–1965. New York: The Estate of David Smith, 2021.
- Clare Lilley, et al. David Smith, Sculpture 1932–1965. Exh. cat. Wakefield: Yorkshire Sculpture Park, 2019.
- Susan J. Cooke, ed. David Smith: Collected Writings, Lectures, and Interviews. Oakland: University of California Press, 2018.
- Peter Stevens and Edith Devaney. David Smith: Origins & Innovations. Exh. cat. New York: Hauser & Wirth, 2017.
- Sarah Hamill. David Smith in Two Dimensions: Photography and the Matter of Sculpture. Oakland: University of California Press, 2015.
- David Breslin, ed. Raw Color: The Circles of David Smith. Exh. cat. Williamstown, Mass.: Sterling and Francine Clark Art Institute, 2014.
- Carol S. Eliel, ed. David Smith: Cubes and Anarchy. Exh. cat. Los Angeles: Los Angeles County Museum of Art, 2011.
- Peter Stevens. David Smith: Sprays. Exh. cat. New York: Gagosian Gallery, 2008.
- Carmen Giménez. David Smith: A Centennial. Exh. cat. New York: Solomon R. Guggenheim Museum, 2006.
- Candida N. Smith, Irving Sandler, et al. The Fields of David Smith. Exh. cat. New York: Thames and Hudson, 1998.
- Dore Ashton and Michael Brenson. David Smith: Medals for Dishonor. Exh. cat. New York: Independent Curators Incorporated, 1996.
- Trinkett Clark. The Drawings of David Smith. Exh. cat. Washington, DC: International Exhibitions Foundation, 1985.
- Karen Wilkin. David Smith. New York: Abbeville Press, 1984.
- Edward F. Fry and Miranda McClintic. David Smith: Painter, Sculptor, Draftsman. New York: George Braziller, in assoc. with the Hirshhorn Museum and Sculpture Garden, Smithsonian Institution, 1983.
- E.A. Carmean Jr. David Smith. Exh. cat. Washington, DC: National Gallery of Art, 1982.
- Rosalind E. Krauss. Terminal Iron Works. The Sculpture of David Smith. Cambridge, Mass. and London: The MIT Press, 1979.
- Cleve Gray, ed. David Smith by David Smith. New York, Chicago, San Francisco: Holt, Rinehart and Winston, 1968.

== See also ==
- Welded sculpture
- Bolton Landing
- Cubi
- Art Students League of New York
- Storm King Art Center
