= Blue Nudes =

Lithographs by Henri Matisse

Blue Nude II
- Artist: Henri Matisse
- Year: 1952
- Type: Gouache-painted paper cut-outs stuck to paper mounted on canvas
- Dimensions: 116.2 cm × 88.9 cm (45.7 in × 35 in)
- Location: Musée National d'Art Moderne; Paris

The Blue Nudes is a series of collages, and related color lithographs, by Henri Matisse, made from paper cut-outs depicting nude figures in various positions. Restricted by his physical condition after his surgery for stomach cancer, Matisse began creating art by cutting and painting sheets of paper by hand; these Matisse viewed as independent artworks in their own right. The Blue Nudes refers also to the editioned multiples based on the cut-outs. Matisse supervised the creation of these lithographs until his death in 1954.

Blue Nude IV, the first of the four nudes, took a notebook of studies and two weeks' work of cutting-and-arranging before the resulting artefact satisfied him. In the event, Matisse finally arrived at his favorite pose, for all four works—intertwining legs and an arm stretching behind the neck. The posture of the nude woman is like the posture of a number of seated nudes made in the first years of the 1920s, ultimately, the posture derives from the reposed figures of Le bonheur de vivre. The second in the series, Blue Nude II, was completed in 1952.

Despite the flatness of paper, the cut-outs reflect Matisse's earlier sculptures in their tangible, relief-like quality, especially the sense of volume created by the overlapping of the cut-outs. Blue Nude I, in particular, can be compared with sculptures such as La Serpentine, from 1909.

The color blue signified distance and volume to Matisse. Frustrated in his attempts to successfully marry dominant and contrasting tones, the artist was moved to use solid slabs of single color early in his career, a technique that became known as Fauvism. The painted gouache cut-outs that compose the Blue Nudes were inspired by Matisse's collection of African sculpture and his visit to Tahiti, in 1930. He required another twenty years and a post-operative period of incapacity, before Matisse synthesized those African and Polynesian influences into this seminal series.

After his death, the works were printed in a special 1956 issue of Verve, entitled "Les Dernières Œuvres de Matisse", though only the ones finished before his death bear his signature. The series was later shown at the Museum of Modern Art (MoMA) from October 2014 to February 2015 as part of the exhibition Henri Matisse: The Cut-Outs.

== See also ==
- List of works by Henri Matisse
