= Canyon (Rauschenberg) =

Combine painting by Robert Rauschenberg

- Artist: Robert Rauschenberg
- Year: 1959
- Type: Oil, pencil, paper, metal, photograph, fabric, wood, canvas, buttons, mirror, taxidermied eagle, cardboard, pillow, paint tube and other materials.
- Location: Museum of Modern Art; New York

Canyon is a 1959 artwork by American artist Robert Rauschenberg. The piece is one of his most celebrated and best known works, and is one of his Combines. Rauschenberg coined the phrase Combine in 1954 to describe his artworks that incorporate elements of both sculpture and painting. Canyon includes a taxidermied golden eagle and a pillow, along with other sculptural elements mounted on a painted and collaged canvas.

Canyon was subject to an ownership controversy after the death of its owner, Ileana Sonnabend. This was due to the work’s inclusion of an endangered species: the taxidermied golden eagle. According to U.S. law, Canyon could never be sold because of the 1940 Bald and Golden Eagle Protection Act and the 1918 Migratory Bird Treaty Act. The prohibition of its sale ultimately resulted in the work’s donation to the Museum of Modern Art in 2012.

== Materials ==
Between 1954 and 1965, Rauschenberg created Combine paintings which often involved affixing sculptural elements to more typical painted canvases. Some Combines are wall-mounted while others are free-standing. In Canyon, elements such as photographic images, fragments of clothing, and newspaper clippings are affixed to the surface either by paint, with string, or by other means. Other examples of such paintings are Reservoir (1961) and Monogram (1955–59).

Canyon features a taxidermied golden eagle, a pillow attached with string, a paint tube, and various textiles. The eagle was given to Rauschenberg by Sari Dienes, which she presumed formerly belonged to her neighbor who was a Rough Rider. Dienes found the golden eagle on the street among her recently deceased neighbor's discarded belongings.

== Ownership history ==
The painting was originally owned by Ileana Sonnabend, a gallerist and collector, until her death. She was a friend and dealer of Rauschenberg, and considered Canyon to be one of her favorite works by the artist. Sonnabend's heirs had little choice but to donate the piece after the IRS established the piece's value at $65 million and charged the Sonnabends $29.2 million in taxes to keep it. However, due to the golden eagle attached to the canvas, the sale of the painting would have been a felony; as such, the estate's appraisers placed a value of $0 on the painting. Due to these complications, the heirs decided to donate the work to MoMA.

Before entering MoMA’s collection, Canyon was displayed intermittently at The Metropolitan Museum of Art, due to an earlier conflict between Sonnabend and the United States Fish and Wildlife Service over the piece. This clash led Sonnabend to display the work publicly in order to keep it in her possession. Although MoMA ultimately received the work, the Met attempted to persuade Sonnabend's family to donate the piece to their institution.

Canyon has been part of MoMA's permanent collection since 2012. After the work was accessioned, an exhibition celebrating both it and Sonnabend, entitled Ileana Sonnabend: Ambassador for the New, was held at MoMA.

== Analysis ==
Canyon, one of Rauschenberg's best known Combines, has been the subject of art historical debate revolving around the validity of reading Rauschenberg's work iconographically. The historian Kenneth Bendiner famously proposed Canyon as a playful recreation of a 1635 Rembrandt painting depicting a scene from Greek mythology, The Rape of Ganymede. He interpreted the suspended pillow in the Combine as Ganymede's buttocks and the stuffed golden eagle as the form assumed by Ganymede's abductor, the Greek god Zeus. Other art historians, such as Branden Joseph, have argued that searching for iconography in Rauschenberg's Combines is useless because meaning can be made to exist anywhere.

More recent interpretations of Canyon reconsider the work in postmodern terms. The art historian Yve-Alain Bois points out that Rauschenberg’s art's "lack of center" is a statement in itself, and the infinite permutations of meaning that can result highlight the subjectivity of art reception that postmodernism explores. Bois also considers the search for iconographic meaning in Rauschenberg's work misguided because it is too limiting.

== In popular culture ==
The painting is featured in Eugene Lim's 2017 novel Dear Cyborgs.
