= Reserve =

Reserve or reserves may refer to:

== Places ==
- Reserve, Kansas, a US city
- Reserve, Louisiana, a census-designated place in St. John the Baptist Parish
- Reserve, Montana, a census-designated place in Sheridan County
- Reserve, New Mexico, a US village
- Reserve, Wisconsin, a census-designated place in the town of Couderay
- Reserve Mines, a community in Cape Breton Regional Municipality, Nova Scotia, Canada

== Auctions ==
- Auction reserve, a minimum amount of money bid required for a sale, e.g., in an English auction
- No-reserve auction (NR), also known as an absolute auction, an auction in which the item for sale will be sold regardless of price
- Reserve price, the underlying concept

== Economics and finance ==
- Reserve (accounting), any part of shareholders' equity, except for basic share capital
- Actuarial reserves, a liability equal to the present value of the future expected cash flows of a contingent event
- Bank reserves, holdings of deposits in central banks plus currency that is physically held in bank vaults
- Foreign-exchange reserves, the foreign currency deposits held by central banks and monetary authorities
  - Reserve currency, a currency which is held in significant quantities as part of foreign exchange reserves
- Mineral reserve, natural resources that are economically recoverable
- Official gold reserves, gold held by central banks as a store of value
- Reserve study, a long-term capital budget planning tool

== Land management ==
- Game reserve, land set aside for maintenance of wildlife, for tourism or hunting
- Indian reserve, a tract of land reserved for the use and benefit of a group of North American Indians
  - Indian colony, the concept in the United States
  - Indian reservation, equivalent concept in the United States
  - Indian reserve, equivalent concept in Canada
  - Urban Indian reserve, equivalent concept in Canada
- Nature reserve, a protected area of importance for wildlife, flora, fauna or features of geological or other special interest
- Open space reserve, an area of protected or conserved land or water on which development is indefinitely set aside

== Military ==
- Military reserve, military units not initially committed to battle
- Military reserve force, a military organization composed of citizens who combine a military role with a civilian career
- Reserve fleet, a collection of partially or fully decommissioned naval vessels not currently needed.
- HMS Reserve, ships of the English Royal Navy

== Sports ==
- Reserve (sport), a player not in the starting lineup
- Injured reserve list, a list of injured players temporarily unable to play
- Reserve clause, part of a player contract in North American professional sports
- Reserve team, the second team fielded by a sports club

== Other uses ==
- Aboriginal reserve, historical government-run settlement in Australia
- Course reserve, library materials reserved for particular users
- Dynamic reserve, the set of metabolites that an organism can use for metabolic purposes
- Fuel reserve, an extra fuel tank, or extra fuel in the main fuel tank
- Injury Reserve, an Arizona hip hop trio formed in 2013
- Reserve Police Officers, auxiliary police officers
- Reserve power, a power that may be exercised by the head of state without the approval of another branch of the government
- Reserve wine, a wine that is specially designated
- Reserved, a Polish clothing store chain
- Stockpile, a reserve of bulk materials for future use

== See also ==
- Hold
- Layaway
- Native Reserve (disambiguation)
- Preserve (disambiguation)
- Reserva (disambiguation)
- Reservation (disambiguation)
- Reservoir (disambiguation)
- Western Reserve (disambiguation)
