= Reserva (disambiguation) =

Reserva may refer to:

- Reserve Wine

== Places ==
- Reserva, Paraná, Brazil
- Reserva do Cabaçal, Mato Grosso, Brazil
- Reserva do Iguaçu, Paraná, Brazil
- Reserva (Buenos Aires), Argentina

== See also ==
- Reserve (disambiguation)
- Reservation (disambiguation)
