= USS Orange =

Tacoma-class patrol frigate

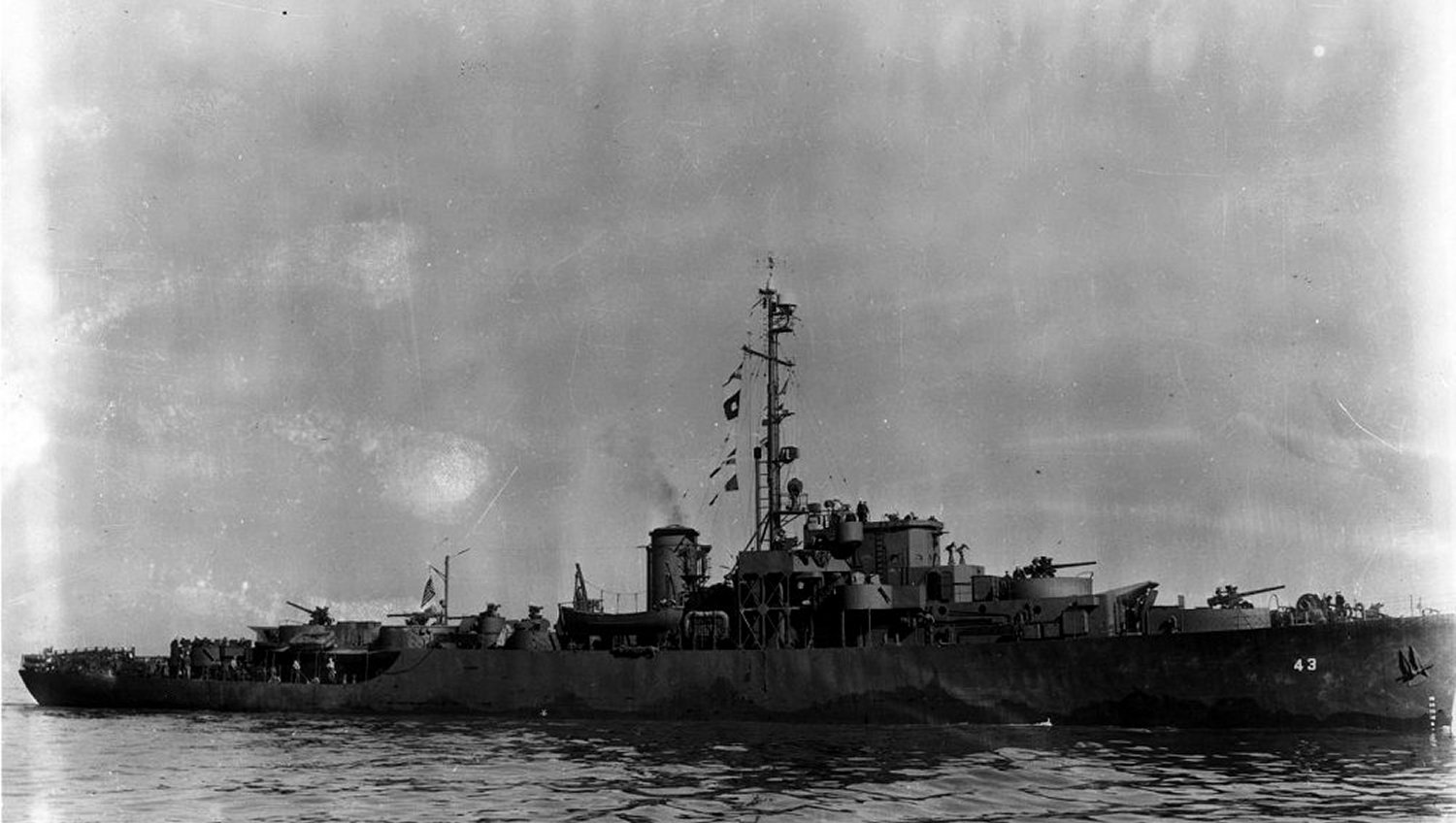

History

United States
- Name: Orange
- Namesake: City of Orange, Texas
- Builder: Consolidated Steel Corporation, Wilmington, Los Angeles
- Laid down: 7 July 1943
- Launched: 6 August 1943
- Commissioned: 1 January 1944
- Decommissioned: 28 October 1946
- Stricken: 23 April 1947
- Honors and awards: 2 × battle stars (World War II)
- Fate: Sold for scrapping, May 1948

General characteristics
- Class & type: Tacoma-class frigate
- Displacement: 1,430 long tons (1,453 t) light; 2,415 long tons (2,454 t) full
- Length: 303 ft 11 in (92.63 m)
- Beam: 37 ft 6 in (11.43 m)
- Draft: 13 ft 8 in (4.17 m)
- Propulsion: 2 × 5,500 shp (4,101 kW) turbines; 3 boilers; 2 shafts
- Speed: 20 knots (37 km/h; 23 mph)
- Complement: 190
- Armament: 3 × 3"/50 dual purpose guns (3x1); 4 x 40 mm guns (2×2); 9 × 20 mm guns (9×1); 1 × Hedgehog anti-submarine mortar; 8 × Y-gun depth charge projectors; 2 × Depth charge tracks

USS Orange (PF-43), a Tacoma-class frigate, was the only ship of the United States Navy to be named for Orange, Texas.

== Construction ==
Orange (PF-43) was originally authorized as PG-151; reclassified PF–43 on 15 April 1943; laid down by the Consolidated Steel Corporation, Wilmington Yard, Los Angeles, California on 7 July 1943; launched 6 August 1943; sponsored by Mrs. Rufus S. Manley of Orange, Texas; commissioned 1 January 1944.

== Service history ==
After shakedown, Orange began her tour of Pacific duty as a fire support and anti-submarine vessel. On 2 June 1944, only five months after commissioning, she participated in her initial engagement at New Guinea. At one stage of the action she closed to within 1,500 yards (1,400 m) of a beach west of the Tor River to shell enemy installations, with the aid of an Army spotter.

Three days later, Orange, with an Army liaison officer on board, shelled supply dumps located along a road between Arami Village and the mouth of the Orai River. A field of floating wreckage hampered her progress as she again closed the shoreline, but she carried out her mission leaving many fires burning in the target area.

Between fire support missions, Orange conducted antisubmarine patrols to protect the heavy flow of supply shipping which supported the landings. On 27 July, while conducting such a patrol, she was directed to embark three Army officers for a scouting party which had been operating behind enemy lines near Sarmi Point. Through radio contact it was learned that the scouting team had encountered a number of Japanese, patrols and that they might have difficulty in getting out. The frigate groped its way around the point, and with all guns manned, closed the shore and dispatched a motor launch with a landing party. Directed with the assistance of an observation plane, the launch moved in and was met by a rubber raft containing the scout group and two Japanese captives. The captives were forward members of one of the enemy patrols.

On 6 September, Orange proceeded to Napido for a scheduled assault landing there. At dawn on the 7th she engaged in shore bombardment to soften the landing area. By the first of December Orange was at Leyte with an ASW screening unit escorting HMS Reserve which had a damaged vessel in tow. As the unit was transiting Surigao Strait on 5 December it came under attack by a lone Japanese plane which was repelled by Orange's fire. On the 6th, she kept several more enemy planes at bay by detecting them early and putting up a stream of fire that made their pilots decide to seek an easier target.

Orange carried out similar missions until February 1945 when she returned to the U.S. for availability at Mare Island Navy Yard. She was then assigned to the West Coast Sound School and was participating in training exercises when the war ended.

On 1 December 1945, Orange went back into the yards and had her guns replaced by an intricate array of meteorological equipment. Thus fitted out, Orange reported to Commander Hawaiian Sea Frontier for duty as a weather station vessel off Pearl Harbor. She served in this capacity until she decommissioned 28 October 1946 at Bremerton, Washington. Struck from the U.S. Naval Register on 23 April 1947, Orange was sold 17 September 1947 to the Alaska Junk Co., of Seattle, Washington, and scrapped in May 1948.

Orange earned two battle stars for service in World War II.
