= Reservoir (Rauschenberg) =

Painting by Robert Rauschenberg

- Artist: Robert Rauschenberg
- Year: 1961
- Type: Oil, pencil, fabric, wood, and metal on canvas with two electric clocks, rubber tread wheel, and spoked wheel rim
- Dimensions: 217.2 cm × 158.7 cm (85.5 in × 62.5 in)
- Location: Smithsonian American Art Museum; Washington, D.C.

Reservoir is a painting by American artist Robert Rauschenberg, from 1961. It is held at the Smithsonian American Art Museum, in Washington, D.C..

== Description ==
The work is one of his combine, which incorporate both two- and three-dimensional found, non-art materials, using objects the artist collected from the streets of his lower Manhattan neighborhood.

According to the museum, the artwork incorporates a length of wood, two clocks, and two cast-off wheels which evoke the always changing and surprising contrasts of everyday experience. The seemingly spontaneous arrangement of objects and the quick, gestural brushstrokes evoke the legacy of abstract expressionism. The two clocks record the time he started making the artwork and the moment he considered it finished.
