= Combine painting =

Artwork incorporating both painting and sculpture

A combine painting or Combine is an artwork that incorporates elements of both painting and sculpture. Items attached to paintings might include three-dimensional everyday objects such as clothing or furniture, as well as printed matter including photographs or newspaper clippings.

The term is most closely associated with the artwork of American artist Robert Rauschenberg (1925–2008) who coined the phrase Combine to describe his own artworks that explore the boundary between art and the everyday world. By placing them in the context of art, he endowed a new significance to ordinary objects. These cross-medium creations challenged the doctrine of medium specificity mentioned by modernist art critic Clement Greenberg.

American artist Frank Stella created a large body of paintings in the late 1950s that recall the Combines of Robert Rauschenberg. In these works, Stella juxtaposed a wide variety of surfaces and materials, a process which led to Stella's later sculpture of the 21st century.

== Rauschenberg's Combines ==
The reception of Rauschenberg’s Combines has been varied throughout their history. Paul Schimmel of the Los Angeles Museum of Contemporary Art described Rauschenberg's Combine paintings as "some of the most influential, poetic and revolutionary works in the history of American art." They have also been called "ramshackle hybrids between painting and sculpture, stage prop and three-dimensional scrap-book assemblage" by The Guardian's critic Adrian Searle.

In 2006, the Museum of Contemporary Art, Los Angeles in association with the Metropolitan Museum of Art presented Robert Rauschenberg: Combines, an exhibition of over 65 of his works. It was shown at the Metropolitan Museum of Art from December 20, 2005–April 2, 2006, and at the Museum of Contemporary Art, Los Angeles, May 21, 2006–September 4, 2006.

In reviews of the 2019 Whitney Biennial, critics highlighted Robert Rauschenberg as precedent for many of the contemporary artworks included. Artist Xaviera Simmons, however, pointed out that these critics did not go far enough to look into Rauschenberg's own precedents; she pointed to African American artists working with found objects in the Southern United States — a likely example for Rauschenberg who was raised in Port Arthur, Texas. In The Art Newspaper, Simmons wrote, “To mention the overarching theme of this iteration of the Whitney Biennial as linked to Robert Rauschenberg’s legacy, for example, without breaking down his connection as a Texan and his probable viewing of the assemblages he must have seen by Black American artists—descendants of slavery—in the rural South is actually preposterous. It does us all an educational disservice and disconnects a lineage and an impetus that is home-grown American. The wonder of Rauschenberg more than likely would not exist without the trauma of the American, disenfranchised rural landscape.”

In his own work, the artist Jasper Johns used similar techniques as those seen in Rauschenberg’s Combines. For example, in a painting, titled Fool’s House (1964), Johns affixed a broom onto his canvas. This possible inspiration from Rauschenberg was likely due to the close artistic and romantic relationship between the two artists. They met for the first time in 1953. Early on, to support their artistic careers, they collaborated on commercial projects, such as window displays for upscale retailers including Tiffany's and Bonwit Teller in Manhattan. As they both progressed in their artistic practices, they had studios in the same building and shared ideas about art and life on a daily basis from 1954 to 1961.

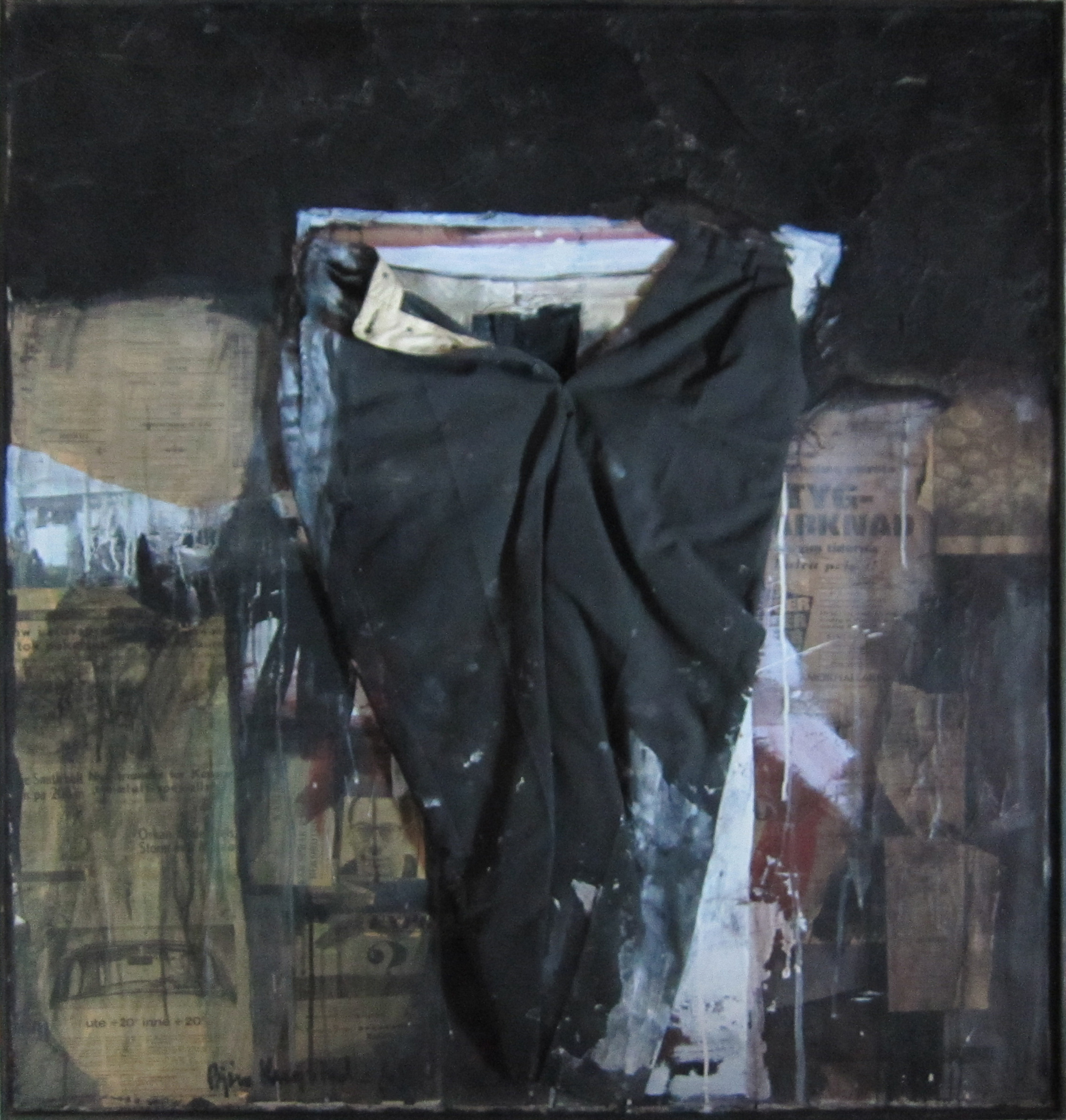
Buksa mi (My Pants), a 1968 Combine by Norwegian artist Bjørn Krogstad

Examples of Rauschenberg's Combine paintings include Bed (1955), Canyon (1959), and the free-standing Monogram (1955–1959). Critic John Perreault wrote "The Combines are both painting and sculpture–or, some purists would say, neither." Perreault praised the works for being memorable, photogenic, and able to "stick in the mind" as well as "surprise and keep on surprising."

Rauschenberg went as far as to incorporate taxidermied animals, including birds, onto some of his Combines. For example, his 1955 work Satellite features a stuffed pheasant "patrolling its top edge." Additionally, his work Canyon (1959) includes a golden eagle affixed to its front. In another work, Odalisk (1955/1958), Rauschenberg included a stuffed rooster.

His Combine Broadcast, which features three concealed radios behind the painting, was called a "melange of paint, grids, newspaper clips and fabric snippets" by Grace Glueck of the New York Times.

The prevailing theme of Rauschenberg's Combine paintings, according to Edmund Burke Feldman, is "nonmeaning, the absurd, or antiart." In this regard the Combine paintings relate to the succeeding Pop art and the much earlier predecessor: the Dada Movement of the early 1900s. Rauschenberg himself said "I don't want a painting to be just an expression of my personality. I feel it ought to be much better than that … I’ve always felt as though, whatever I’ve used and whatever I’ve done, the method was always closer to a collaboration with materials than to any kind of conscious manipulation and control."

Moira Roth links the Combines to Marcel Duchamp's attitude in art, saying that the perceived density of the content, and the integration of mass media elements is a facade born out of the alienation and indifference experienced by the artist during the McCarthy Period. Jonathan Katz says that underneath the impersonal and inexpressive appearance of Rauschenberg’s art is a hidden homosexual code that can unlock some of the significance of the work.

== Exponential increase in value ==
In the early 1960s, Rauschenberg's Combines sold from $400 to $7,500. In 1999, the Museum of Modern Art, which had balked at buying Rauschenberg's work decades earlier, spent $12 million to buy his Factum II, made in 1957. Rauschenberg's Rebus was valued in 1991 at $7.3 million. This three-panel work created in 1955 that takes its name from the Latin for a "puzzle of images and words", it "builds a narrative from seemingly nonsensical sequences of found images and abstract elements," according to The New York Times. MoMA bought Rebus in 2005. In 2008, The New York Times' art critic Roberta Smith, who described Combines as "multimedia hybrids", wrote that MoMA was "Rauschenberg Central" because they own around 330 of his works, more than the Whitney Museum of American Art who now owns only 81. In 2012, Canyon was donated to MoMA by the children of Ileana Sonnabend as part of an IRS settlement that valued the work at $65 million. The highest recorded selling price for a Combine was for Johanson’s Painting (1961) which sold for $18 million in 2015.

== Canyon (1959) ==
Canyon, 1959 Combine: oil, pencil, paper, fabric, metal, cardboard box, printed paper, printed reproductions, photograph, wood, paint tube, and mirror on canvas with oil on taxidermied eagle, string, and pillow Robert Rauschenberg 207.6 × 177.8 × 61 cm

Canyon, one of Rauschenberg's best known Combines, has been the subject of art-historical debate revolving around the validity of reading Rauschenberg's work iconographically. The historian Kenneth Bendiner famously proposed Canyon as a playful recreation of a 1635 Rembrandt painting depicting a scene from Greek mythology, The Rape of Ganymede. He interpreted the suspended pillow in the Combine as Ganymede's buttocks and the stuffed golden eagle as the form assumed by Ganymede’s abductor, the Greek god Zeus. Other art historians, such as Branden Joseph, have argued that searching for iconography in Rauschenberg's Combines is useless because it can be made to exist anywhere.

More recent interpretations of Canyon reconsider the work in postmodern terms. The art historian Yve-Alain Bois points out that Rauschenberg's art's "lack of center" is a statement in itself, and the infinite permutations of meaning that can result highlight the subjectivity of art reception that postmodernism explores. Bois also considers the search for iconographic meaning in Rauschenberg's work misguided because it is too limiting.

== See also ==
- Paul Kelpe
- Assemblage
- Mixed media
