= Reservoir (disambiguation) =

A reservoir is an artificial lake.

Reservoir may also refer to:

== Arts and entertainment ==
- Reservoir (Fanfarlo album), 2009
- Reservoir (Gordi album), 2017
- Reservoir (EP), by Fionn Regan, 2003
- Reservoir (Rauschenberg), a 1961 painting by Robert Rauschenberg
- The Reservoir, 2025 play by Jake Brasch

== Business ==
- Reservoir Media, a U.S. music rights company
- Reservoir Records, a U.S. record label

== Places ==
- Reservoir, Victoria, Australia, a suburb of Melbourne
  - Reservoir railway station
- Reservoir, Western Australia, Australia, a suburb of Perth
- Reservoir station (MBTA), Boston, Massachusetts, US, a light-rail stop
- Reservoir, Pennsylvania, a census-designated place
- Reservoir, Providence, Rhode Island, US, a neighborhood

== Science and technology ==
- Coolant reservoir, which captures overflow of coolant
- Natural reservoir, an alternative or passive host for a disease
  - Fomite, any inanimate object or substance capable of carrying infectious organisms
- Petroleum reservoir, a subsurface pool of hydrocarbons
- Ommaya reservoir, a neurosurgical catheter
- Thermal reservoir, an effectively infinite pool of thermal energy at a given, constant temperature
- Thermodynamic reservoir, a type of thermodynamic instrument
