= Paul Kelpe =

German-born American abstract painter (1902–1985)

- Self-portrait, c. 1930
- Born: January 15, 1902; Minden, Westphalia, German Empire
- Died: December 8, 1985 (aged 83); Austin, Texas, United States
- Known for: Painting
- Movement: Abstract art, Combine painting

Paul Kelpe (/ˈkɛlpi/; January 15, 1902 – December 8, 1985) was a German-born American abstract painter. His constructions integrating found objects into paintings were the first such works created in the United States and he painted two of the five Williamsburg murals, the first abstract murals in the United States. In addition to his mural work for various American government projects, he was an innovative independent painter and university art professor. He was a pioneer of American abstract art, including his work in Chicago during a period in which abstracts were not well accepted or appreciated.

== Germany ==
Paul Kelpe was born in Minden, Germany on January 15, 1902. After viewing an exhibit of abstract art, Kelpe, who had previously wanted to become a musician, decided instead to pursue a career as a painter. In 1919 he attended the Academy of Arts in Hanover, studying art history and architecture. His artistic training in Germany included studies with Wassily Kandinsky and László Moholy-Nagy, and he encountered art by other modernists including Kurt Schwitters, Naum Gabo, and El Lissitzky. He became familiar with prominent European modernist movements of the time such as Suprematism and Constructivism. Schwitters in particular proved to be a major influence, but Kelpe, eschewing what he viewed as Schwitters' disorderly style, created neater works, meticulously painting geometric shapes without noticeable brushstrokes. His work of this period depicted hard-edged planes and shapes which overlapped and interpenetrated, and he conceived of his paintings as an "organization of forms, not objects of nature". Kelpe said that his parents were not pleased with these abstractions, and they sent him to the United States, hoping that might help to set him on the correct artistic path.

== Early years in the United States ==
He left Germany for the United States in 1925, staying in New Jersey and New York City. During this period, he integrated found objects into his paintings, resulting in works containing two- and three-dimensional elements. Kelpe was the first artist to create such combine paintings in the United States. His constructions "show a keen formal understanding and playful wit". In the early 1930s he moved on from this assemblage technique; rather than incorporating physical objects into his works, he instead began painting mechanical parts such as wheels and gears into his abstractions. A reviewer noted that Kelpe's "hard-edged geometric paintings ... celebrate the harmony of man and machine".

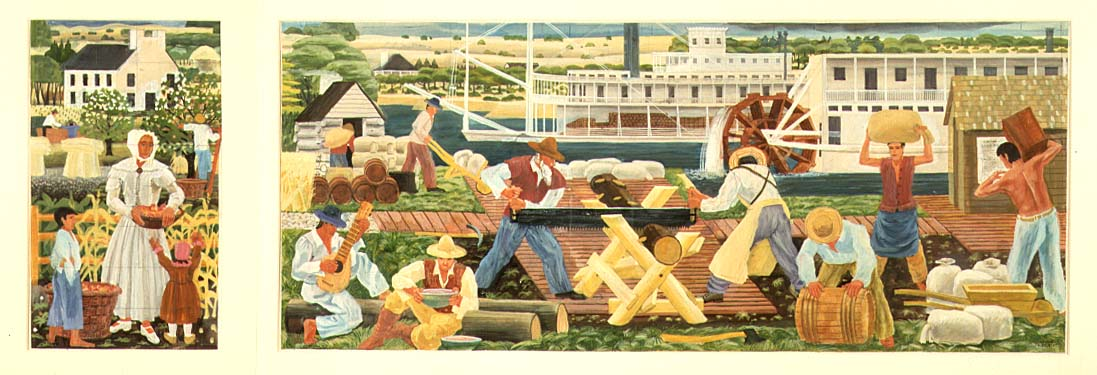
History of Southern Illinois

In 1930 he moved to Chicago, where he was employed by the Public Works of Art Project and as a Federal Art Project muralist. Kelpe was seen as a bit of an anomaly because of his commitment to abstract art while the Chicago art scene was still firmly centered on Realism. He was the only abstract artist covered in a 1932 book detailing modern art in Chicago. Kelpe's first solo show was in 1931 or 1932 at Chicago's Little Gallery. He wrote that this was "the first time that any one-man shows of abstract art took place in Chicago."

He began work in 1934 painting murals for the Chicago branch of the Public Works of Art Project. As this project was largely concerned with American scene painting and was not open to abstract art, Kelpe included representational images such as buildings and wheels in his designs. His images, products of his imagination rather than any real world industrial site, incorporated a balance of shapes in various sizes and colors. He depicted the American factory as "a Bauhaus-inspired arrangement of geometric machinery". In spite of his efforts to conform to the representational requirements of the job, his mural compositions still received criticism because they were too abstract.

In 1935 Kelpe worked for the Federal Art Project. He created a representational American scene mural for the Southern Illinois University library, History of Southern Illinois, depicting the area's industrial, agricultural, and commercial history.

== Later years ==
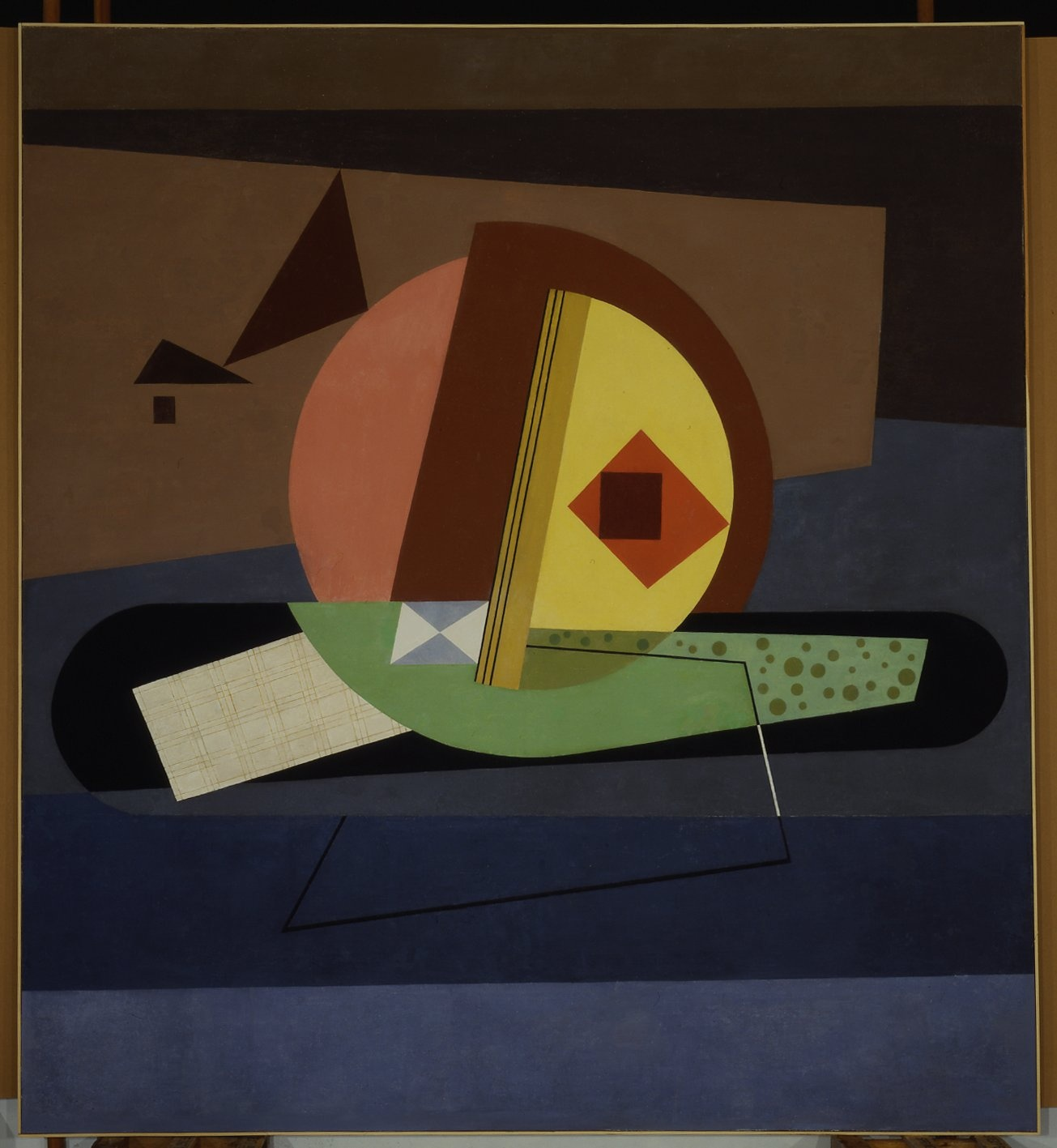
Untitled left panel from the Williamsburg Housing Project murals

Feeling stifled by the attitudes so strongly favoring realist art, and desiring an atmosphere which would be more accepting of his abstract sensibilities, Kelpe relocated to New York in about 1935. He gained American citizenship the next year.

In 1936–1937, Kelpe painted two large abstract murals for Brooklyn's Williamsburg Housing Project after being hired by Burgoyne Diller for the New York City Works Progress Administration Mural Program of the Federal Art Project. Diller had selected the artists to participate in the Williamsburg mural project. In addition to Kelpe's two murals, Ilya Bolotowsky, Albert Swinden and Balcomb Greene each created one.

Kelpe's detailed murals, which include various geometric shapes such as triangles, rectangles, trapezoids, and circles, differ from the others in the project by their unique color juxtapositions, their striped, gridded, or bubbled patterns, and their sculpture-like structures. A critic for New York magazine writes that Kelpe's work "looks best of all; his allegiance to Synthetic Cubism may have weighted favor against him at the time, but now his pair of canvases seem masterly in their subtle balance of oranges and greens, and their purely abstract hints of Picassoid guitars – real jazz-age exuberance." The murals, owned by the New York City Housing Authority, are on loan to the Brooklyn Museum.

These five paintings were the first abstract murals anywhere in the United States, and they're considered to be some of the most significant. Art historians have praised the murals as "extremely important artworks, quite courageous and extraordinary ... painted in the most radical style you could get at the time", "key to American art between the wars", and "national treasures".

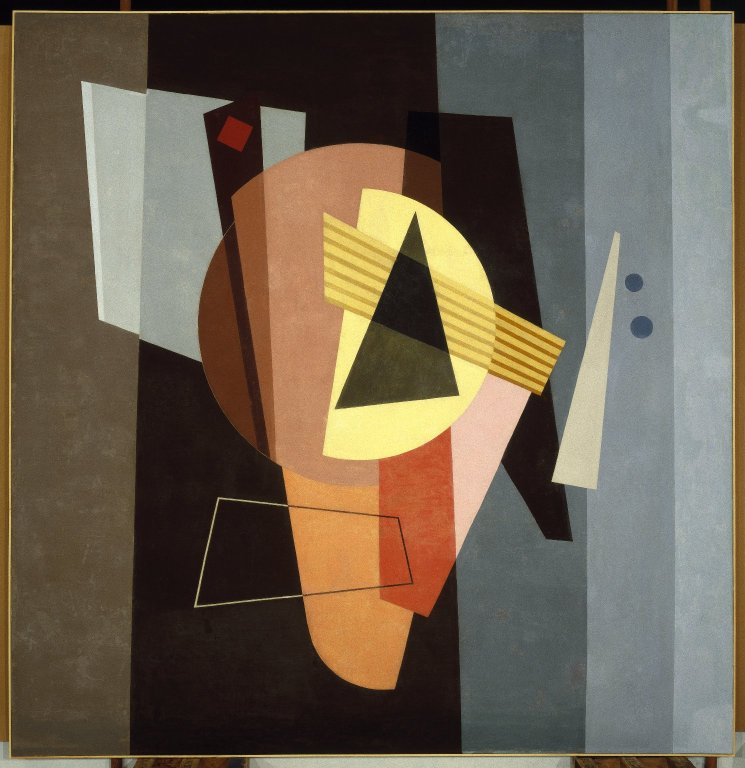
Untitled right panel from the Williamsburg Housing Project murals

Kelpe was one of the founders of the American Abstract Artists, and he was the secretary of the organization from 1936 to 1939, and its treasurer from 1939 to 1940. He was an active participant in their exhibitions, but was a controversial member. Although the group sought to engender acceptance of abstract art by the public, critics within the ranks of the organization disapproved of Kelpe's "spatial illusionism", whereby his geometric shapes appeared to float in three-dimensional space. Most members of the group favored flat Mondrian-like grids. Kelpe's resignation was requested because they felt that his paintings which included representational elements with perspectival depth were not abstract enough. The abstractionists in New York generally did not use axial layering as did Kelpe. The inspiration for his technique may be traced back to his exposure while still a student in Germany to the Russian and German Constructivists such as Kandinsky, Lissitzky, and Schwitters.

Kelpe resumed his academic education, studying art history at the University of Chicago. He earned a master's degree in 1948 and a doctorate in 1957. He later became a professor, teaching art and art history for many years at various colleges and universities. Starting in the 1950s, his creations featured crystal-like shapes and more elaborate changes in perspective. He experienced financial hardship in the 1950s, writing that his circumstances were hopeless, and that he couldn't afford to both pay the rent and purchase food.

Kelpe said of his work, "I compose my paintings of form and color, like a musician composes music with rhythm and sound." In light of his musical inclinations, his art has been compared to innovative music of his time, such as Edgard Varèse's chamber music.

Kelpe's elaborate abstract painting techniques are reminiscent of those used in Purism and Orphism. The artistic movements which inspired him included Constructivism, Cubism, and Geometric abstraction. Kelpe has been referred to as "one of the key figures of Constructivist abstraction in America".

In 1969 he retired from his work as a professor, living in Austin, Texas, where he was able to devote his time to the pursuit of painting. He died in Austin on December 8, 1985.

== Collections ==
Public collections containing Kelpe's work include:

- Art Institute of Chicago (Chicago, Illinois)
- Ball State University Museum of Art (Muncie, Indiana)
- Baltimore Museum of Art (Baltimore, Maryland)
- Brooklyn Museum (Brooklyn, New York)
- Chazen Museum of Art (Madison, Wisconsin)
- Detroit Institute of Arts (Detroit, Michigan)
- Hirshhorn Museum and Sculpture Garden (Washington, DC)
- Howard University Gallery of Art (Washington, DC)
- Kresge Art Museum, Michigan State University (East Lansing, Michigan)
- Los Angeles County Museum of Art (Los Angeles, California)
- Museum of Modern Art (New York City)
- Naples Museum of Art (Naples, Florida)
- Newark Museum (Newark, New Jersey)
- Smithsonian American Art Museum (Washington, DC)
- Spurlock Museum, University of Illinois (Urbana, Illinois)
- University Art Gallery, Indiana State University (Terre Haute, Indiana)
- Weisman Art Museum (Minneapolis, Minnesota)
- Whitney Museum of American Art (New York City)
