= Eugene Lim (novelist) =

American novelist

- Born: 1974 (age 51–52)
- Education: Stanford University
- Occupations: Novelist; Publisher; Librarian
- Writing career
- Years active: 2008–present
- Notable awards: Dos Passos Prize
- Website: www.eugenelim.com

Eugene Lim is an American novelist, publisher, and librarian. He has published four novels since 2008, and his writings have appeared in The New Yorker, The Believer, The Baffler, Granta, Triple Canopy, The Denver Quarterly, The Brooklyn Rail, and others. Lim is the founder and publisher of Ellipsis Press. He works as a librarian at Hunter College High School in New York City.

== Early life ==
Lim grew up in a small town in Ohio and attended Stanford University where he studied under the novelist and poet Gilbert Sorrentino. Lim has described growing up as a Korean American in the Midwest and experiencing a sense of cultural distance from both Korea and mainstream American identity. In a 2017 interview with Farrar, Straus and Giroux, he reflected on questions of assimilation and referred to himself as "helplessly American". Hua Hsu's profile of Lim in The New Yorker notes that his fiction draws in part on the experience of Asian American boyhood in a small town in Ohio.

He briefly worked in publishing after college before going back to school to become a librarian. Lim founded Ellipsis Press in 2008, a small press that publishes several works a year.

== Career ==
Reviewers have noted Lim's experimental approach to form and his interest in contemporary political and technological life. Hua Hsu, profiling Lim in The New Yorker, said "[Lim's] writing is confident and tranquil; he has a knack for making everyday life seem strange . . . There's an intoxicating, whimsical energy on every page." Novelist Dennis Cooper described Lim as "adventurous with form and style."

Lim's first novel, Fog & Car was published by Ellipsis Press in 2008, and was reissued by Coffee House Press in 2024. The Strangers was published by Black Square Editions in 2014. Farrar, Straus, Giroux released Dear Cyborgs in 2017. Chris Kraus selected this novel in her year-end list for BOMB Magazine: "A Bolano-esque labyrinth of shaggy dog stories flow through the narrator, describing the existential and physical conditions of a present in which it's easier to imagine the end of the world than the end of capitalism, but it's written in calm and succinct, elegant prose." Jonathan Lethem said that the novel "blew me away with its deceptively blithe mixture of cryptic humor, philosophical ingenuity, and genuine political yearning. It made me think of Robert Bolano and Tom McCarthy." Lim's fourth novel, Search History, came out through Coffee House Press in 2021. A review in the Chicago Review of Books noted that the novel addresses questions of thought and connection mediated through the internet. Space Bar is forthcoming from Doubleday.

Lim was awarded the 2025 John Dos Passos Prize, given to "a talented American writer who experiments with form, explores a range of voices and merits further recognition." Announcing the award, David Magill, chair of the English department at Longwood University cited Lim's formal innovation and prose style. Lim is an editor at large for the literary journal Harp & Altar. Lim started a Substack in January 2026 titled Imagine Cassandra Happy, publishing new fiction.

== Bibliography ==
- Fog & Car, New York: Ellipsis Press, 2008. ISBN 9780963753601. Reissued Minneapolis, MN: Coffee House Press, 2024. ISBN 9781566896931
- The Harp & Altar Anthology. Editor, with Keith Newton. New York: Harp & Altar, 2010. ISBN 9780963753649
- The Strangers, New York: Black Square Editions, 2014. ISBN 9780986005022
- Dear Cyborgs, New York: FSG Originals, 2017. ISBN 9780374537111
- Search History, Minneapolis, MN: Coffee House Press, 2021. ISBN 9781566896177
- Space Bar, New York: Doubleday. Forthcoming.
