= Dear Cyborgs =

Novel by Eugene Lim

- First edition
- Author: Eugene Lim
- Publisher: FSG Originals
- Publication date: June 6, 2017
- Pages: 176
- Preceded by: The Strangers (2013)
- Followed by: Search History (2021)

Dear Cyborgs is a 2017 novel with elements of speculative fiction by American writer Eugene Lim. Lim wrote two other novels before Dear Cyborgs, which include Fog and Car (2008) and The Strangers (2013).

== Development ==
Lim wrote the novel before the 2016 presidential election. He nevertheless wrote it in "a state of despair" due to climate change and economic inequality, which he refers to as two “slow apocalypses”.

Lim has said that he believes "...superheroes are the central mythology of our collective global era" on their inclusion in the novel.

=== Influences ===
A number of works influenced Lim while writing Dear Cyborgs. Tan Lin's Insomnia and the Aunt and Yongsoo Park's Boy Genius both influenced the novel's plot as existing works that subvert tropes in Asian American assimilation plots. Robert Creeley's The Island and Eileen Myles’ Inferno—both "poet's novels"—influenced Lim's authorial presence.

== Setting ==
The novel alternates between several settings, including a "white-bread suburban" town in Ohio during the 1980s, and New York City circa 2011, during a fictionalized version of Occupy Wall Street. Lim grew up in small-town Ohio, and later moved to New York.

== Publication history ==
FSG Originals, an imprint of Farrar, Straus and Giroux, published the novel in 2017.

== Reception ==
Critics gave Dear Cyborgs mostly positive reviews. The novel was a Literary Hub staff favorite book of 2017, one of Vol. 1 Brooklyn's Favorite Fiction Books of 2017, and chosen by BOMB Magazine as a one of their "Looking Back on 2017: Literature" selections.

Writer Hua Hsu praised the book, stating in The New Yorker: "...his writing is confident and tranquil; he has a knack for making everyday life seem strange—or, in the case of "Dear Cyborgs," for making revolution seem like the most natural thing possible."
