= Robert Rauschenberg =

American painter and graphic artist (1925–2008)

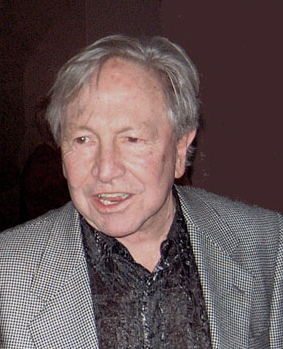
- Rauschenberg in 1999
- Born: Milton Ernest Rauschenberg; October 22, 1925; Port Arthur, Texas, U.S.
- Died: May 12, 2008 (aged 82); Captiva, Florida, U.S.
- Education: Kansas City Art Institute; Académie Julian; Black Mountain College; Art Students League of New York
- Known for: Assemblage
- Notable work: Canyon (1959); Monogram (1959)
- Movement: Neo-Dada, Abstract expressionism, Pop art
- Spouse: Susan Weil (m. 1950; div. 1953)
- Awards: Leonardo da Vinci World Award of Arts (1995); Praemium Imperiale (1998)

Milton Ernest "Robert" or "Bob" Rauschenberg (October 22, 1925 – May 12, 2008) was an American painter and multi-media artist, whose work has been associated with numerous mid-20th century art movements including the New York School, Conceptual Art, Pop art, and Neo-Dada. Rauschenberg is well known for his Combines (1954–1964), a group of artworks which incorporated everyday objects as art materials and which blurred the distinctions between painting and sculpture. Rauschenberg was primarily a painter and a sculptor, but he also worked with photography, printmaking, papermaking and performance.

Rauschenberg received numerous awards during his nearly 60-year artistic career. Among the most prominent were the International Grand Prize in Painting at the 32nd Venice Biennale in 1964 and the National Medal of Arts in 1993.

Rauschenberg lived and worked in New York City and on Captiva Island, Florida, until his death on May 12, 2008.

== Early life and education ==
Rauschenberg was born Milton Ernest Rauschenberg in Port Arthur, Texas, the son of Dora Carolina (née Matson) and Ernest R. Rauschenberg. His father was of German and his mother of Dutch descent. Rauschenberg incorrectly claimed that his paternal grandmother Tina “Tiny” Jane Howard was Cherokee. His father worked for Gulf States Utilities, a light and power company. His parents were Fundamentalist Christians. He had a younger sister named Janet Begneaud.

At 18, Rauschenberg was admitted to the University of Texas at Austin where he began studying pharmacology, but he dropped out shortly after due to the difficulty of the coursework—not realizing at this point that he was dyslexic—and because of his unwillingness to dissect a frog in biology class. He was drafted into the United States Navy in 1944. Based in California, he served as a neuropsychiatric technician in a Navy hospital until his discharge in 1945 or 1946.

Rauschenberg subsequently studied at the Kansas City Art Institute and the Académie Julian in Paris, France, where he met fellow art student Susan Weil. At that time he also changed his name from Milton to Robert. In 1948 Rauschenberg joined Weil in enrolling at Black Mountain College in North Carolina.

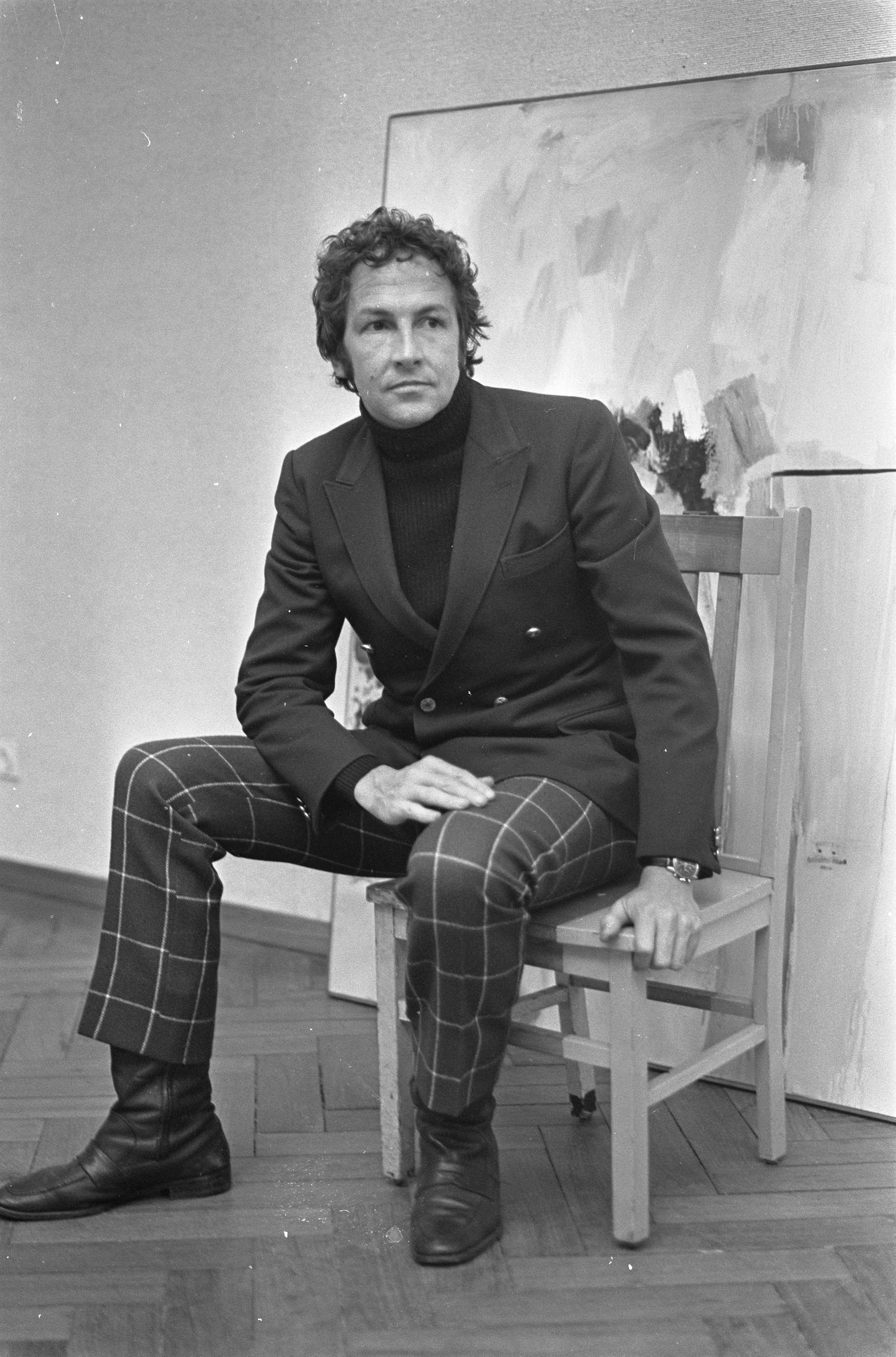
Rauschenberg at the Stedelijk Museum Amsterdam, February 1968

At Black Mountain, Rauschenberg sought out Josef Albers, a founder of the Bauhaus in Germany, whom he had read about in an August 1948 issue of Time magazine. He hoped that Albers' rigorous teaching methods might curb his habitual sloppiness. Albers' preliminary design courses relied on strict discipline that did not allow for any "uninfluenced experimentation."

Rauschenberg became, in his own words, "Albers' dunce, the outstanding example of what he was not talking about". Although Rauschenberg considered Albers his most important teacher, he found a more compatible sensibility in John Cage, an established composer of avant-garde music. Like Rauschenberg, Cage had moved away from the teachings of his instructor, Arnold Schoenberg, in favor of a more experimentalist approach to music. Cage provided Rauschenberg with much-needed support and encouragement during the early years of his career, and the two remained friends and artistic collaborators for decades to follow.

From 1949 to 1952 Rauschenberg studied with Vaclav Vytlacil and Morris Kantor at the Art Students League of New York, where he met fellow artists Knox Martin and Cy Twombly.

== Personal life ==
Rauschenberg married Susan Weil in the summer of 1950 at the Weil family home in Outer Island, Connecticut. Their only child, Christopher, was born July 16, 1951. The two separated in June 1952 and divorced in 1953. Thereafter, Rauschenberg had romantic relationships with fellow artists Cy Twombly and Jasper Johns, poet John Giorno, among others. His partner for the last 25 years of his life was artist Darryl Pottorf, his former assistant.

In the 1970s he moved into NoHo in Manhattan in New York City.

Rauschenberg purchased the Beach House, his first property on Captiva Island, on July 26, 1968. However, the property did not become his permanent residence until the fall of 1970.

== Death ==
Rauschenberg died of heart failure on May 12, 2008, on Captiva Island, Florida.

== Work ==
Rauschenberg's approach was sometimes called "Neo-Dadaist," a label he shared with the painter Jasper Johns. Rauschenberg famously stated that "painting relates to both art and life," and he wanted to work "in the gap between the two." Like many of his Dadaist predecessors, Rauschenberg questioned the distinction between art objects and everyday objects, and his use of readymade materials reprised the intellectual issues raised by Marcel Duchamp's Fountain (1917). Duchamp's Dadaist influence can also be observed in Jasper Johns' paintings of targets, numerals, and flags, which were familiar cultural symbols: "things the mind already knows."

At Black Mountain College, Rauschenberg experimented with a variety of artistic mediums including printmaking, drawing, photography, painting, sculpture, and theatre; his works often featured some combination of these. He created his Night Blooming paintings (1951) at Black Mountain by pressing pebbles and gravel into black pigment on canvas. In the very same year he made full body blueprints in collaboration with Susan Weil in his New York apartment, which "they hope to turn [...] into screen and wallpaper designs".

From the fall of 1952 to the spring of 1953, Rauschenberg traveled in Italy and North Africa with his fellow artist and partner Cy Twombly. There, he created collages and small sculptures, including the Scatole Personali and Feticci Personali, out of found materials. He exhibited them at galleries in Rome and Florence. To Rauschenberg's surprise, a number of the works sold; many that did not he threw into the river Arno, following the suggestion of an art critic who reviewed his show.

Upon his return to New York City in 1953, Rauschenberg began creating sculpture with found materials from his Lower Manhattan neighborhood, such as scrap metal, wood, and twine. Throughout the 1950s, Rauschenberg supported himself by designing storefront window displays for Tiffany & Co. and Bonwit Teller, first with Susan Weil and later in partnership with Jasper Johns under the pseudonym Matson Jones.

Untitled (1963), oil, silkscreen, metal, and plastic on canvas

In a famously cited incident of 1953, Rauschenberg requested a drawing from the Abstract Expressionist painter Willem de Kooning for the express purpose of erasing it as an artistic statement. This conceptual work, titled Erased de Kooning Drawing, was executed with the elder artist's consent.

In 1961, Rauschenberg explored a similar conceptual approach by presenting an idea as the artwork itself. He was invited to participate in an exhibition at the Galerie Iris Clert in Paris, where artists were to present portraits of Clert, the gallery owner. Rauschenberg's submission consisted of a telegram declaring "This is a portrait of Iris Clert if I say so."

By 1962, Rauschenberg's paintings were beginning to incorporate not only found objects but found images as well. After a visit to Andy Warhol's studio that year, Rauschenberg began using a silkscreen process, usually reserved for commercial means of reproduction, to transfer photographs to canvas. The silkscreen paintings made between 1962 and 1964 led critics to identify Rauschenberg's work with Pop art.

During this period Rauschenberg created Barge, a 32 foot long silkscreen and oil work created predominantly over a 24 hour period. Images recognizable in the work include trucks, spacecraft, text and parts of Diego Velázquez’s Rokeby Venus, among others.

Rauschenberg had experimented with technology in his artworks since the making of his early Combines in the mid-1950s, where he sometimes used working radios, clocks, and electric fans as sculptural materials. He later explored his interest in technology while working with Bell Laboratories research scientist Billy Klüver. Together they realized some of Rauschenberg's most ambitious technology-based experiments, such as Soundings (1968), a light installation which responded to ambient sound. In 1966, Klüver and Rauschenberg officially launched Experiments in Art and Technology (E.A.T.), a non-profit organization established to promote collaborations between artists and engineers.

In 1969, NASA invited Rauschenberg to witness the launch of Apollo 11. In response to this landmark event, Rauschenberg created his Stoned Moon Series of lithographs. This involved combining diagrams and other images from NASA's archives with his own drawings and handwritten text.

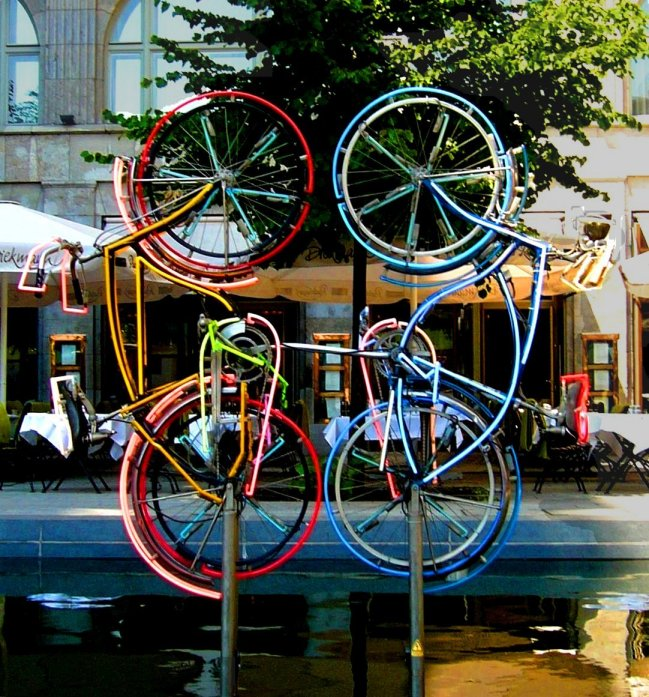
Riding Bikes (1998) in Berlin

From 1970, Rauschenberg worked from his home and studio in Captiva, Florida. The first works he created in his new studio were Cardboards (1971–72) and Early Egyptians (1973–74), for which he relied on locally sourced materials such as cardboard and sand. Where his previous works had often highlighted urban imagery and materials, Rauschenberg now favored the effect of natural fibers found in fabric and paper. He printed on textiles using his solvent-transfer technique to make the Hoarfrost (1974–76) and Spread (1975–82) series; the latter featured large stretches of collaged fabric on wood panels. Rauschenberg created his Jammer (1975–76) series using colorful fabrics inspired by his trip to Ahmedabad, India, a city famous for its textiles. The imageless simplicity of the Jammer series is a striking contrast with the image-filled Hoarfrosts and the grittiness of his earliest works made in New York City.

International travel became a central part of Rauschenberg's artistic process after 1975. In 1984, Rauschenberg announced the start of his Rauschenberg Overseas Culture Interchange (ROCI) at the United Nations. Almost entirely funded by the artist, the ROCI project consisted of a seven-year tour to ten countries around the world. Rauschenberg took photographs in each location and made artworks inspired by the cultures he visited. The resulting works were displayed in a local exhibition in each country. Rauschenberg often donated an artwork to a local cultural institution.

Beginning in the mid-1980s, Rauschenberg focused on silkscreening imagery onto a variety of differently treated metals, such as steel and mirrored aluminum. He created many series of so-called "metal paintings," including: Borealis (1988–92), Urban Bourbons (1988–1996), Phantoms (1991), and Night Shades (1991). In addition, throughout the 1990s, Rauschenberg continued to utilize new materials while still working with more rudimentary techniques. As part of his engagement with the latest technological innovations, in his late painting series he transferred digital inkjet photographic images to a variety of painting supports. For his Arcadian Retreats (1996) he transferred imagery to wet fresco. His Love Hotel [Anagram (A Pun)] from 1998, and made out of vegetable dye transfer on polylaminate, is included in the permanent collection of the Pérez Art Museum Miami, in Florida, the artist's home state for nearly forty years. In keeping with his commitment to the environment, Rauschenberg used biodegradable dyes and pigments, and water rather than chemicals in the transfer process.

=== The White Paintings, black paintings, and Red Paintings ===
In 1951 Rauschenberg created his White Painting series in the tradition of monochromatic painting established by Kazimir Malevich, who reduced painting to its most essential qualities for an experience of aesthetic purity and infinity. The White Paintings were shown at Eleanor Ward's Stable Gallery in New York in fall 1953. Rauschenberg used everyday white house paint and paint rollers to create smooth, unembellished surfaces which at first appear as blank canvas. Instead of perceiving them to be without content, however, John Cage described the White Paintings as "airports for the lights, shadows and particles"; surfaces which reflected delicate atmospheric changes in the room. Rauschenberg himself said that they were affected by ambient conditions, "so you could almost tell how many people are in the room." Like the White Paintings, the black paintings of 1951–1953 were executed on multiple panels and were predominantly single color works. Rauschenberg applied matte and glossy black paint to textured grounds of newspaper on canvas, occasionally allowing the newspaper to remain visible.

By 1953 Rauschenberg had moved from the White Painting and black painting series to the heightened expressionism of his Red Painting series. He regarded red as "the most difficult color" with which to paint, and accepted the challenge by dripping, pasting, and squeezing layers of red pigment directly onto canvas grounds that included patterned fabric, newspaper, wood, and nails. The complex material surfaces of the Red Paintings were forerunners of Rauschenberg's well-known Combine series (1954-1964).

=== Combines ===
Bed (1955) at the Museum of Modern Art in 2022

Rauschenberg collected discarded objects on the streets of New York City and brought them back to his studio where he integrated them into his work. He claimed he "wanted something other than what I could make myself and I wanted to use the surprise and the collectiveness and the generosity of finding surprises. [...] So the object itself was changed by its context and therefore it became a new thing."

Rauschenberg's comment concerning the gap between art and life provides the departure point for an understanding of his contributions as an artist. He saw the potential beauty in almost anything; he once said, "I really feel sorry for people who think things like soap dishes or mirrors or Coke bottles are ugly, because they're surrounded by things like that all day long, and it must make them miserable." His Combine series endowed everyday objects with a new significance by bringing them into the context of fine art alongside traditional painting materials. The Combines eliminated the boundaries between art and sculpture so that both were present in a single work of art. While "Combines" technically refers to Rauschenberg's work from 1954 to 1964, Rauschenberg continued to utilize everyday objects such as clothing, newspaper, urban debris, and cardboard throughout his artistic career.

Canyon (1959), Combine painting

His transitional pieces that led to the creation of Combines were Charlene (1954) and Collection (1954/1955), where he collaged objects such as scarves, electric light bulbs, mirrors, and comic strips. Although Rauschenberg had implemented newspapers and patterned textiles in his black paintings and Red Paintings, in the Combines he gave everyday objects a prominence equal to that of traditional painting materials. Considered one of the first of the Combines, Bed (1955) was created by smearing red paint across a well-worn quilt, sheet, and pillow. The work was hung vertically on the wall like a traditional painting. Because of the intimate connections of the materials to the artist's own life, Bed is often considered to be a self-portrait and a direct imprint of Rauschenberg's interior consciousness. Some critics suggested the work could be read as a symbol for violence and rape, but Rauschenberg described Bed as "one of the friendliest pictures I've ever painted." Among his most famous Combines are those that incorporate taxidermied animals, such as Monogram (1955–1959) which includes a stuffed angora goat, and Canyon (1959), which features a stuffed golden eagle. Although the eagle was salvaged from the trash, Canyon drew government ire due to the 1940 Bald and Golden Eagle Protection Act.

Critics originally viewed the Combines in terms of their formal qualities: color, texture, and composition. The formalist view of the 1960s was later refuted by critic Leo Steinberg, who said that each Combine was "a receptor surface on which objects are scattered, on which data is entered." According to Steinberg, the horizontality of what he called Rauschenberg's "flatbed picture plane" had replaced the traditional verticality of painting, and subsequently allowed for the uniquely material-bound surfaces of Rauschenberg's work.

In 2006, the Museum of Contemporary Art, Los Angeles in association with the Metropolitan Museum of Art presented Robert Rauschenberg: Combines, an exhibition of over 65 of his works. It was shown at the Metropolitan Museum of Art from December 20, 2005 – April 2, 2006, and at the Museum of Contemporary Art, Los Angeles, May 21, 2006 – September 4, 2006.

=== Performance and dance ===
Rauschenberg began exploring his interest in dance after moving to New York in the early 1950s. He was first exposed to avant-garde dance and performance art at Black Mountain College, where he participated in John Cage's Theatre Piece No. 1 (1952), often considered the first Happening. He began designing sets, lighting, and costumes for Merce Cunningham and Paul Taylor. In the early 1960s he was involved in the radical dance-theater experiments at Judson Memorial Church in Greenwich Village, and he choreographed his first performance, Pelican (1963), for the Judson Dance Theater in May 1963. Rauschenberg was close friends with Cunningham-affiliated dancers including Carolyn Brown, Viola Farber, and Steve Paxton, all of whom featured in his choreographed works. Rauschenberg's full-time connection to the Merce Cunningham Dance Company ended following its 1964 world tour. In 1966, Rauschenberg created the Open Score performance for part of 9 Evenings: Theatre and Engineering at the 69th Regiment Armory, New York. The series was instrumental in the formation of Experiments in Art and Technology (E.A.T.).

In 1977 Rauschenberg, Cunningham, and Cage reconnected as collaborators for the first time in thirteen years to create Travelogue (1977), for which Rauschenberg contributed the costume and set designs. Rauschenberg did not choreograph his own works after 1967, but he continued to collaborate with other choreographers, including Trisha Brown, for the remainder of his artistic career.

=== Commissions ===
Throughout his career, Rauschenberg designed numerous posters in support of causes that were important to him. In 1965, when Life magazine commissioned him to visualize a modern Inferno, he did not hesitate to vent his rage at the Vietnam War and other contemporary sociopolitical issues, including racial violence, neo-Nazism, political assassinations, and ecological disaster.

In 1969 the Metropolitan Museum of Art in New York City commissioned Rauschenberg to create a piece in honor of its centennial. He learned that the museum's original goals were detailed in a certificate from 1870 and created his 'Centennial Certificate' based on that object, with images of some of the best-known pieces in the museum and the signatures of the board at that time. Copies of the Centennial Certificate exist in numerous museums and private collections.

On December 30, 1979, the Miami Herald printed 650,000 copies of Tropic, its Sunday magazine, with a cover designed by Rauschenberg. In 1983, he won a Grammy Award for his album design of Talking Heads' album Speaking in Tongues. In 1986 Rauschenberg was commissioned by BMW to paint a full size BMW 635 CSi for the sixth installment of the famed BMW Art Car Project. Rauschenberg's car was the first in the project to feature reproductions of works from the Metropolitan Museum of Art, New York, as well as his own photographs.

In 1998, the Vatican commissioned a work by Rauschenberg in honor of the Jubilee year 2000 to be displayed in the Padre Pio Liturgical Hall, San Giovanni Rotondo, Italy. Working around the theme of the Last Judgement, Rauschenberg created The Happy Apocalypse (1999), a twenty-foot-long maquette. It was ultimately rejected by the Vatican on the grounds that Rauschenberg's depiction of God as a satellite dish was an inappropriate theological reference.

=== Exhibitions ===
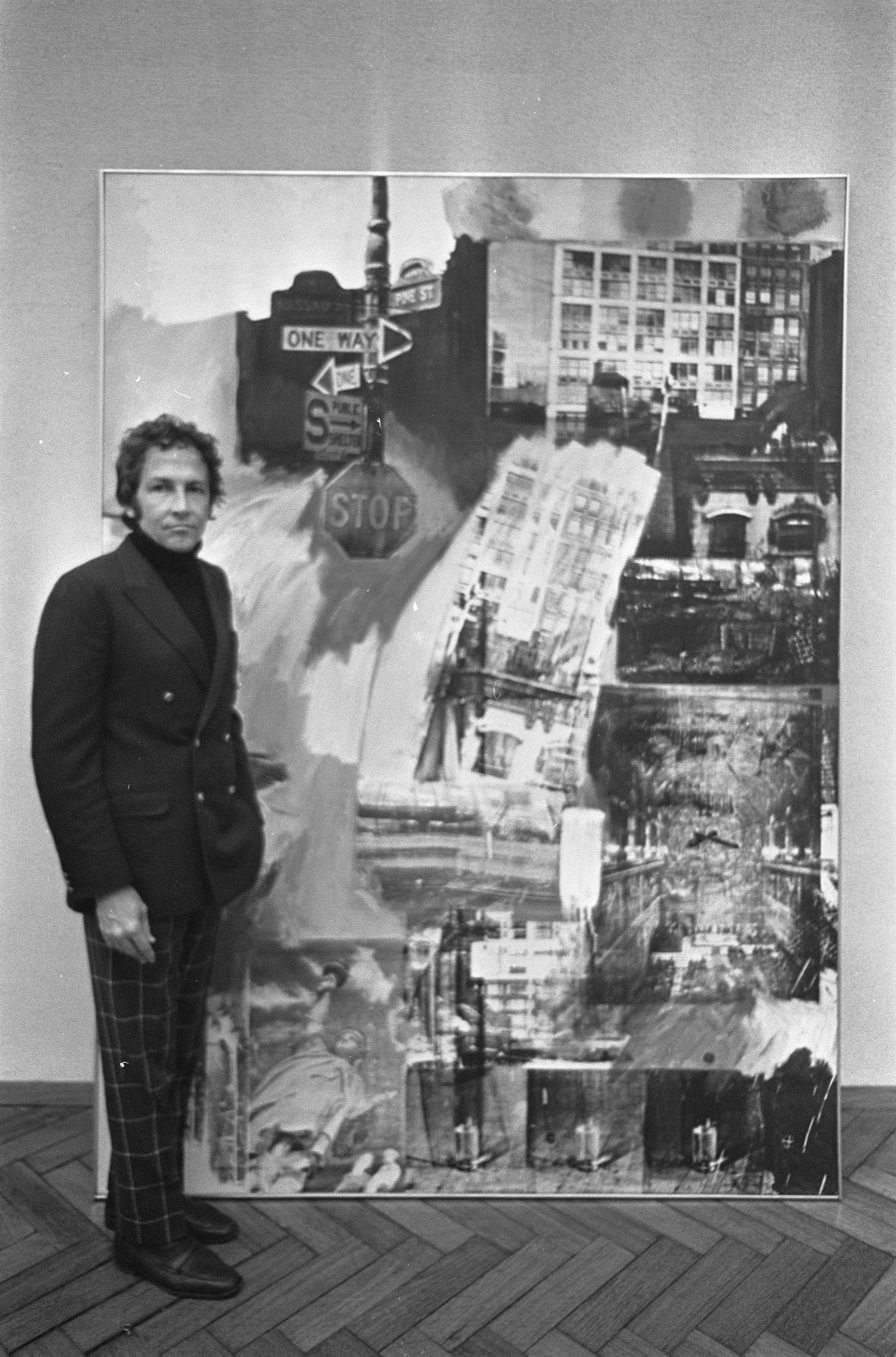
Rauschenberg with Estate (1963) at the Stedelijk Museum Amsterdam, February 1968

Rauschenberg had his first solo exhibition at the Betty Parsons Gallery in spring 1951. In 1953, while in Italy, he was noted by Irene Brin and Gaspero del Corso and they organized his first European exhibition in their famous gallery in Rome. In 1953, Eleanor Ward invited Rauschenberg to participate in a joint exhibition with Cy Twombly at the Stable Gallery. In his second solo exhibition in New York at the Charles Egan Gallery in 1954, Rauschenberg presented his Red Paintings (1953–1953) and Combines (1954–1964). Leo Castelli mounted a solo exhibition of Rauschenberg's Combines in 1958. The only sale was an acquisition by Castelli himself of Bed (1955), now in the collection of the Museum of Modern Art, New York.

Rauschenberg's first career retrospective was organized by the Jewish Museum, New York, in 1963. In 1964 he became one of the first American artists to win the International Grand Prize in Painting at the Venice Biennale (James Whistler and Mark Tobey had previously won painting prizes in 1895 and 1958 respectively). A mid-career retrospective was organized by the National Collection of Fine Arts (now the Smithsonian American Art Museum), Washington, D.C., and traveled throughout the United States between 1976 and 1978.

In the 1990s a retrospective was held at the Solomon R. Guggenheim Museum, New York (1997), which traveled to museums in Houston, Cologne, and Bilbao through 1999. An exhibition of Combines was presented at the Metropolitan Museum of Art, New York (2005; traveled to Museum of Contemporary Art, Los Angeles, Centre Georges Pompidou, Paris, and Moderna Museet, Stockholm, through 2007). Rauschenberg's first posthumous retrospective was mounted at Tate Modern (2016; traveled to Museum of Modern Art, New York, and San Francisco Museum of Modern Art through 2017).

Further exhibitions include: Robert Rauschenberg: Jammers, Gagosian Gallery, London (2013); Robert Rauschenberg: The Fulton Street Studio, 1953–54, Craig F. Starr Associates (2014); A Visual Lexicon, Leo Castelli Gallery (2014); Robert Rauschenberg: Works on Metal, Gagosian Gallery, Beverly Hills (2014); Rauschenberg in China, Ullens Center for Contemporary Art, Beijing (2016); Robert Rauschenberg, DE SARTHE, Hong Kong (2016); and Rauschenberg: The 1/4 Mile at the Los Angeles County Museum of Art (2018–2019).

From June 27, 2025 - February 15, 2026, the Virginia Museum of Fine Arts exhibited Robert Rauschenberg: Cardbirds. The works were created in 1971 “from photographic and mechanical transfers as well as relief printing. His prints were designed to look like actual flattened cardboard boxes, replete with labels and stickers.”

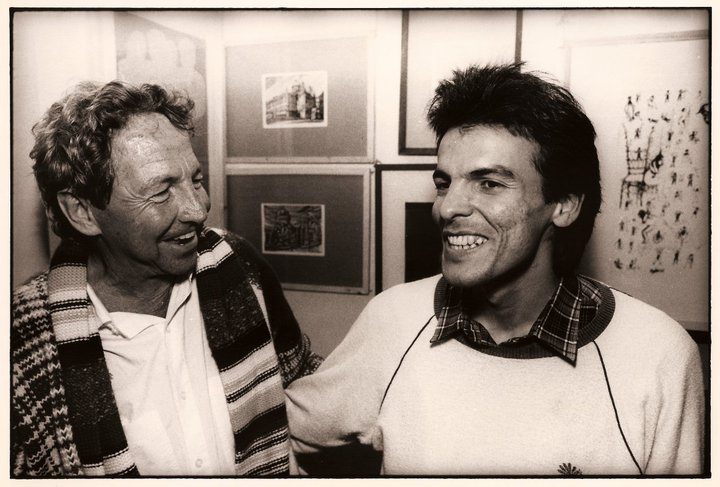
Rauschenberg and artist José Bernal at the René Portocarrero Serigraphy Workshop in Havana, 1988

To celebrate the centenary of Rauschenberg’s birth, the Solomon R. Guggenheim Museum will host Robert Rauschenberg: Life Can’t Be Stopped featuring seminal works including Barge, a 32 foot long silkscreen he made mostly over the course of one day. The exhibition runs October 10, 2025 – April 5, 2026, and includes loans from the Robert Rauschenberg Foundation. It is one of several exhibits celebrating the centenary including Robert Rauschenberg: Fabric Works of the 1970s at the Menil Collection, Robert Rauschenberg: The Use of Images at the Fundación Juan March, and Five Friends: John Cage, Merce Cunningham, Jasper Johns, Robert Rauschenberg, Cy Twombly at the Museum Brandhorst and Museum Ludwig.

From September 9 – April 11, 2026, the Grey Art Museum displayed Handle with Care: Robert Rauschenberg's Ecological Conscience, an exhibit that examine Rauschenberg’s belief that “…artists have both the imperative and power to promote responsible stewardship of the planet.”

From September 12, 2025 – April 19, 2026, Museum of the City of New York exhibited Robert Rauschenberg’s New York: Pictures From the Real World, one of several exhibits celebrating the centennial of Rauschenberg’s birth.

=== Art market ===
In the early 1970s, Rauschenberg lobbied U.S. Congress to pass a bill that would compensate artists when their work is resold on the secondary market. Rauschenberg took up his fight for artist resale royalties (droit de suite) after the taxi baron Robert Scull sold part of his collection of Abstract Expressionist and Pop art works for $2.2 million. Scull had originally purchased Rauschenberg's paintings Thaw (1958) and Double Feature (1959) for $900 and $2,500 respectively; roughly a decade later Scull sold the pieces for $85,000 and $90,000 in a 1973 auction at Sotheby Parke Bernet in New York.

Rauschenberg's lobbying efforts were rewarded in 1976 when California governor Jerry Brown signed into law the California Resale Royalty Act of 1976. The artist continued to pursue nationwide resale royalties legislation following the California victory.

In 2010 Studio Painting (1960‑61), one of Rauschenberg's Combines originally estimated at $6 million to $9 million, was bought from the collection of Michael Crichton for $11 million at Christie's, New York. In 2019, Christie's sold the silkscreen painting Buffalo II (1964) for $88.8 million, shattering the artist's previous record.

== Legacy ==
Rauschenberg believed strongly in the power of art as a catalyst for social change. The Rauschenberg Overseas Culture Interchange (ROCI) began in 1984 as an effort to spark international dialogue and enhance cultural understanding through artistic expression. A ROCI exhibition went on view at the National Gallery of Art, D.C., in 1991, concluding a ten-country tour: Mexico, Chile, Venezuela, China, Tibet, Japan, Cuba, U.S.S.R., Germany, and Malaysia.

In 1970, Rauschenberg created a program called Change, Inc., to award one-time emergency grants of up to $1,000 to visual artists based on financial need. In 1990, Rauschenberg created the Robert Rauschenberg Foundation (RRF) to promote awareness of the causes he cared about, such as world peace, the environment and humanitarian issues. In 1986, Rauschenberg received the Golden Plate Award of the American Academy of Achievement. He was awarded the National Medal of Arts by President Bill Clinton in 1993. In 2000, Rauschenberg was honored with amfAR's Award of Excellence for Artistic Contributions to the Fight Against AIDS.

RRF today owns many works by Rauschenberg from every period of his career. In 2011, the foundation presented The Private Collection of Robert Rauschenberg in collaboration with Gagosian Gallery, featuring selections from Rauschenberg's personal art collection. Proceeds from the exhibition helped fund the foundation's philanthropic activities. Also in 2011, the foundation launched its "Artist as Activist" project and invited artist Shepard Fairey to focus on an issue of his choice. The editioned work he made was sold to raise funds for the Coalition for the Homeless. RRF continues to support emerging artists and arts organizations with grants and philanthropic collaborations each year. The RRF has several residency programs that take place at the foundation's headquarters in New York and at the late artist's property in Captiva Island, Florida.

In 2013, Dale Eisinger of Complex ranked Open Score (1966) seventh in his list of the all-time greatest performance art works.

The Bob Rauschenberg Gallery at Florida SouthWestern State College was renamed in 2004 (from The Gallery of Fine Art, founded 1979) in Rauschenberg's honor and with his blessing.

== See also ==
- Combine painting
