= HMS Reserve =

HMS Reserve includes the following ships:

- English ship Reserve (1650)
- HMS Reserve (1704)

== See also ==
- Reserve (disambiguation)
