= Reservation =

Reservation may refer to:

== Places ==
Types of places:

- Indian reservation, in the United States
- Military base, often called reservations
- Nature reserve

== Government and law ==
- Reservation (law), a caveat to a treaty
- Reservation in India, a government policy imposing reserved caste quotas for affirmative action
- Disallowance and reservation, a constitutional power in several Commonwealth nations

== Arts, entertainment, and media ==
- Reservation (mixtape), a mixtape by Angel Haze
- "Reservations", a song by Spoon from their album A Series of Sneaks
- "Reservations", a song by Wilco from their album Yankee Hotel Foxtrot

== Other uses ==
- Reserved sacrament or Reservation of the Sacrament, a Christian religious practice
- Table reservation, for restaurant seating
- Computer reservation system, for travel and accommodations

== See also ==
- Reserve (disambiguation)
- Indian reserve, in Canada
- Indigenous territory (disambiguation)
