= Native reserve =

Native reserve or Reserve may refer to:

== Places ==
=== Australia ===
- Aboriginal reserve
- Indigenous Protected Area

=== Canada ===
- Urban Indian reserve/Réserve indienne urbaine
- Indian reserve

=== New Zealand ===
- Native Reserves, areas formerly designated for Māori people
- (see also Te Puni Kōkiri (Ministry of Māori Development))

=== South Africa ===
- Bantustans, originally created as native reserves by the British government

=== United States ===
- Hawaiian home land
- Indian reservation
- Indian colony
- List of Alaska Native tribal entities

=== Israel ===
- Gaza Strip
- West Bank

== See also ==
- Homeland
- Apartheid in South Africa
