= Monogram (artwork) =

Work by Robert Rauschenberg

- Artist: Robert Rauschenberg
- Year: 1955–1959
- Type: Oil, paper, fabric, printed reproductions, metal, wood, rubber shoe-heel, and tennis ball on two conjoined canvases with oil on taxidermied Angora goat with brass plaque and rubber tire on wood platform mounted on four casters.
- Location: Moderna Museet, Stockholm

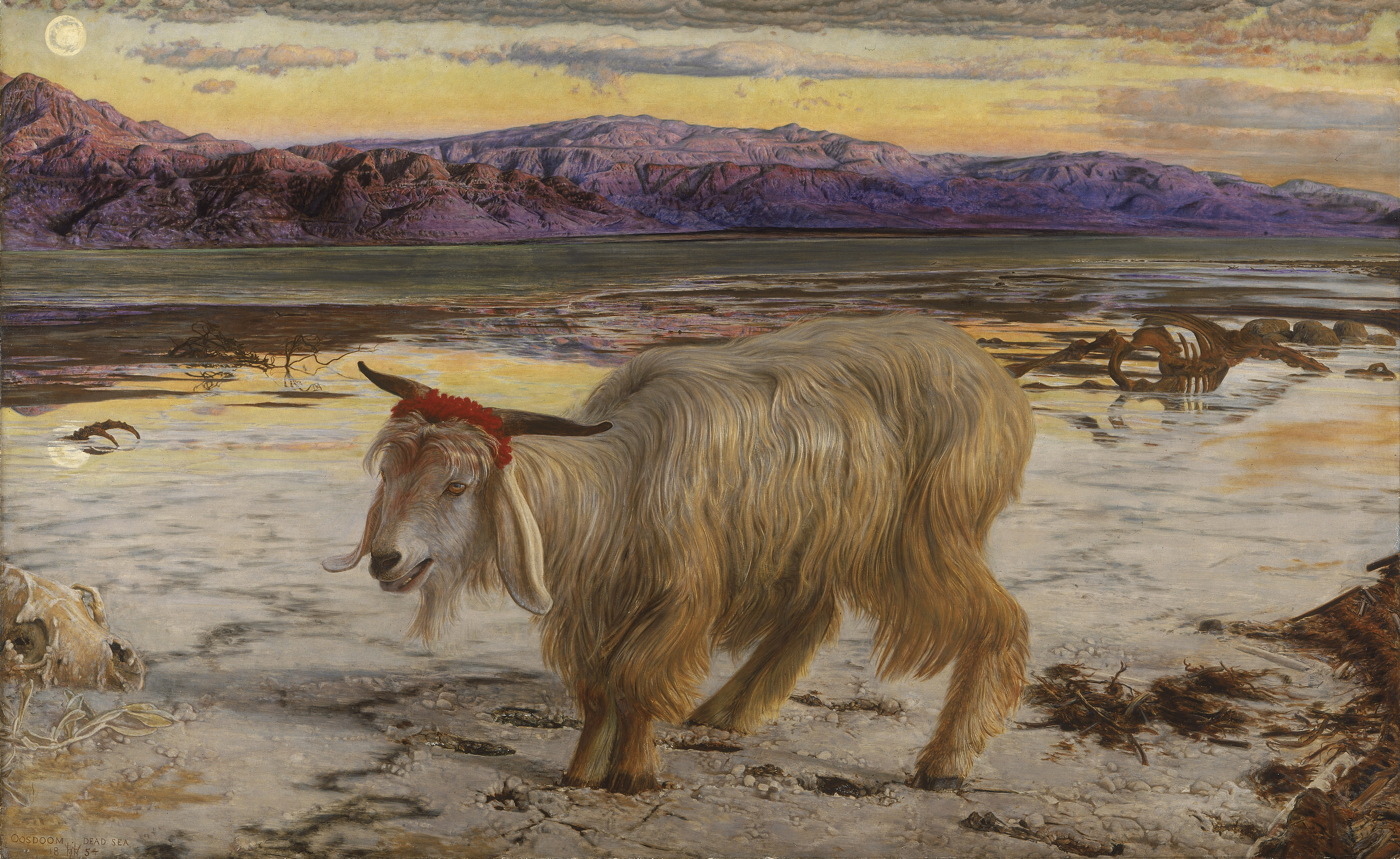
The Scapegoat, William Holman Hunt, 1854–1856, oil on canvas

Monogram is a combine by American artist Robert Rauschenberg, made between 1955 and 1959. It consists of a stuffed Angora goat with its midsection passing through an automobile tire. Critic Jorg von Uthmann described it in the Huffington Post as Rauschenberg's most famous work. In 1965, Pontus Hultén purchased the artwork for the collection of the Moderna Museet in Stockholm.

== History ==
Rauschenberg created a series of artworks between 1954 and 1964 that merge aspects of both traditional painting and sculpture. He coined the term “Combine” to describe this new artistic category. Monogram typifies the idea of the Combine as a free-standing sculptural artwork that also incorporates a painted canvas.

The artist first saw the stuffed Angora goat in the window of a secondhand furniture store at Seventh Avenue in New York. He bought it for $15 which was all of the money that he had on him at the time. Over the next four years (1955–1959), Monogram evolved through three different stages, which are documented in several studies and photographs. The title came from the union of the goat and tire, which reminded the artist of the interweaving letters in a monogram.

== Monogram’s multiple forms ==
From 1955 to 1959, Monogram took on three different incarnations. In the first iteration (1955–1956), the goat was poised on a shelf that was connected to a wall-mounted painting that later became Rhyme (1956). According to Calvin Tomkins, this version was eventually altered because Rauschenberg was dissatisfied that the goat could only be viewed from one side.

Robert Rauschenberg by the first form of Monogram

In 1956, Rauschenberg reconstructed Monogram. In this second state, the goat was encircled by a tire with its tread repainted white and was standing on a narrow wooden platform with a vertical extension at its posterior. In this second state of Monogram, one side of the vertical panel is painted and collaged. Rauschenberg was unsatisfied with this version, as he felt that the goat appeared to be pulling the painting.

Robert Rauschenberg by the second form of Monogram

In the third and final incarnation of Monogram (1959), following the suggestion of Jasper Johns, Rauschenberg placed a square panel on casters on the floor and centered the goat, as if in a pasture.

== Analysis ==
Rauschenberg insisted throughout his career that he carefully avoided creating closed systems of meaning when making his artwork. "If I see any superficial subconscious relationships that I'm familiar with—cliches of associations—I change the picture." Rather, he insisted that meaning resides within each viewer and their individual direct experience of the elements combined in the work: "A stuffed goat is special in the way that a stuffed goat is special."

Art historian Graham Smith, summarizing his review of Rauschenberg's statements on Monogram, concludes: "Rauschenberg himself never suggested that the goat in Monogram was anything other than a goat or that the tyre was anything more than a tyre."

Any search for a fixed unitary meaning in a work like Monogram operates in contradiction to Rauschenberg's stated intentions. Yet dozens of readings have been proposed by authors mining the elements of the artist's biography, the iconographic history of the objects contained in the work, as well as aesthetic and philosophical implications of the manner in which they have been combined.

Kenneth Bendiner has interpreted the work as "a specific re-working" of the Pre-Raphaelite painter William Holman Hunt’s The Scapegoat. This work depicts a goat awaiting sacrifice in order to erase the blame of the Israelites in the Old Testament. As such, Bendiner reads the goat as a Christ figure, with the tire around his waist symbolizing Christ's burden of man's sins.

This reading has also been linked with a biographical anecdote involving a pet goat that Rauschenberg had as a child. He recounted coming home from school one day to find that his father had slaughtered the goat.

Art critic Catherine Craft said of the work: "Not surprisingly, Monogram shocked contemporary viewers. Still, there is also a strangely poignant beauty to its acquiescent, eternally patient goat. Some observers have associated it with an animal awaiting sacrifice. Nevertheless, with its horns and long, shimmering coat it also recalls the Feticci Personali Rauschenberg made in Italy." (Feticci Personali is a series of hanging 'fetish' assemblages of animal fur, rope, wood and various small objects, referencing handmade totemic sculptures worshipped for magical powers or believed to be inhabited by a spirit.)

Critic Robert Hughes ignited controversy by insisting that the work referenced homoerotic themes and subtext, saying, "One looks at it remembering that the goat is an archetypal symbol of lust, so Monogram is the most powerful image of anal intercourse ever to emerge from the rank psychological depths of modern art. Yet it is innocent, too, and sweet, and (with its cascading ringlets) weirdly dandified: a hippy goat, a few years before the 1960s. Fifty years after its creation, it remains one of the great, complex emblems of modernity, as unforgettable (in its way) as the flank of Cézanne's mountain, the cubist kitchen table or the wailing woman in Guernica."

Although this oft-quoted reading generated a great deal of attention, it is by no means definitive. Responding to the controversy, critic Leo Steinberg said:

This is strong and seductive prose...Yet I find the proposed reading too reductive to persuade. In place of an ever-astonishing incongruity, we are given the notion of a close fit. For what Rosalind Krauss calls, 'An uncontainable network of associations,' we are offered one overwhelmingly single meaning, making the work and its motivations—as Rauschenberg put it on an earlier occasion—'too simple,' too single-minded. The thrill generated in Rauschenberg's work of the fifties by the unpredictable, the perilously uncontrolled, the indeterminate connotation, has been replaced by one naughtiness—excitement of a different order.

It is worth noting that Hughes's reading is the only interpretation of Monogram that Robert Rauschenberg took pains to specifically disavow. Meanwhile, critic Arthur Danto wrote:

Utterly familiar as tires and goats are - so familiar that they could be images in an alphabet book for children (T is for tire, G is for goat) - no one had ever seen a goat wreathed with a tire before, as in Rauschenberg's signature work Monogram. Who could say what it meant? The goat is, to be sure, a sacrificial animal, so it is entirely thinkable that it would be wreathed with laurel when led to the altar. Monogram is an exceedingly evocative and at the same time a very funny work. Who knows what Rauschenberg was thinking? All one knows is that nothing like it had been seen in the entire history of art, and that goat and tire had identities so strong as to counteract any tendency to think of them as other than what they were....the power and absurdity of the combination suggests that his gifts of adjunction surpassed entirely his—our—capacity to interpret."
