= The Rape of Ganymede (Rembrandt) =

Painting by Rembrandt

Rape of Ganymede
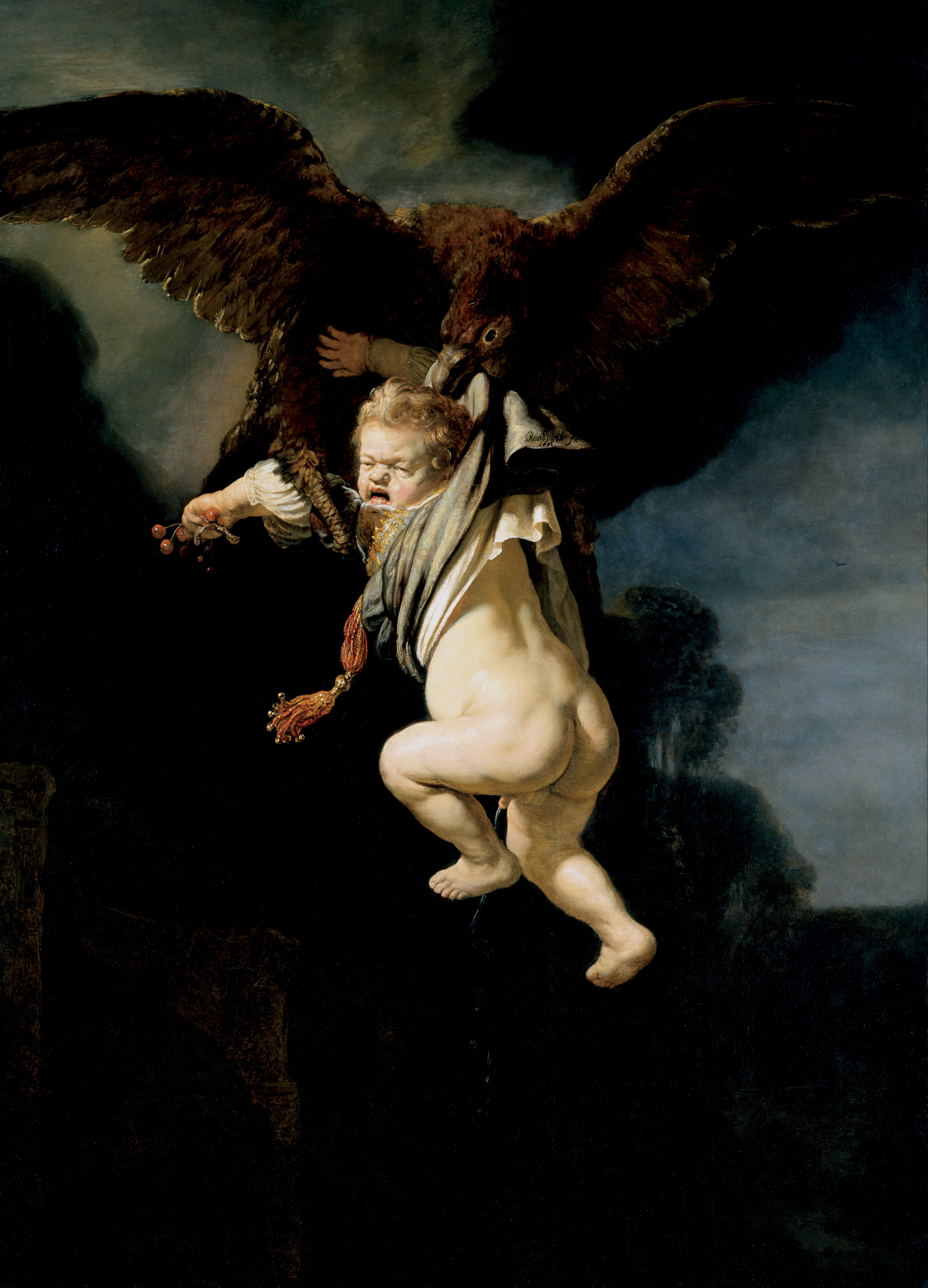
- Artist: Rembrandt
- Year: 1635
- Catalogue: Rembrandt Research Project, A Corpus of Rembrandt Paintings VI: #137
- Medium: Oil on panel
- Dimensions: 177 cm × 130 cm (70 in × 51 in)
- Location: Gemäldegalerie Alte Meister, Dresden

The Rape of Ganymede (also called The Abduction of Ganymede) is an oil painting of 1635 by the Dutch Golden Age painter Rembrandt, depicting the myth of Ganymede. It is in the collection of the Gemäldegalerie Alte Meister in Dresden since 1751.

== Painting ==
This painting was documented by Hofstede de Groot in 1915, who wrote:

207. THE RAPE OF GANYMEDE. Sm. 197; Bode 79; Dut. 106; Wb. 70; B-HdG. 197. The eagle of Zeus, seen in front with out-stretched wings, rises towards the heavens. He holds with his beak the clothing, and with his talons the left arm, of the fair curly-haired boy, who, turned sharply to the left and almost seen from the back, faces round to the spectator as if crying loudly, and with his right hand tries to repulse the bird. His light blue dress and shirt are pulled up by the eagle's claws so as to expose the whole of the boy's lower limbs. On the left the corner of a scarf with a tassel flaps in the wind. The boy, who in his fright makes water, holds cherries in his left hand. Bright light falls from the left full on the boy. The sombre background contains on the left at foot some clumps of trees, before which in the foreground are the pinnacles of a building. Full length, life size. Signed at top on the hem of the shirt, "Rembrandt ft. 1635"; oak panel, 68 1/2 inches by 52 inches. A drawing showing a sketch for the picture is in the Dresden Print-room; reproduced by Lippmann, No. 136. Engraved by C. G. Schultze, by A. Cardon in Reveil, by L. Noel in "The Dresden Gallery." Mentioned by Vosmaer, pp. 154, etc., 507; by Bode, pp. 439, 568; by Dutuit, p. 28; by Michel, pp. 221, etc., 553 [170-71, 438]. Sales. Amsterdam, April 26, 1716 (Hoet, i. 191), No. 33 (175 florins). W. van Velthuyzen, Rotterdam, April 15, 1751, No. 46. Bought in the same year at Hamburg through Heinecken for Dresden. In the Dresden Gallery, 1908 catalogue, No. 1558.

Hofstede de Groot did not comment on the theme of this painting at all, though Smith before him found it highly unusual when he wrote:

197. The Rape of Ganymede. If the picture (for the present description is taken from a print) be really by Rembrandt, his intention must have been to burlesque the mythological subject above stated, for he has represented the beautiful Ganymede as a great lubberly child, with a blubbering grimace of countenance, sprawling, with extended arms, in the talons and beak of the eagle Jupiter. The bird has seized him by his unclassical raiments, the weight of his fat body has drawn his clothes up to his shoulders, and left his lower extremities in a state of nudity, and is thus bearing him through the murky air to Olympus. Engraved by A. Cardon. 6 ft. 3 in. by 2 ft. 8 in.—C. Now in the Dresden Gallery.

== Interpretation ==
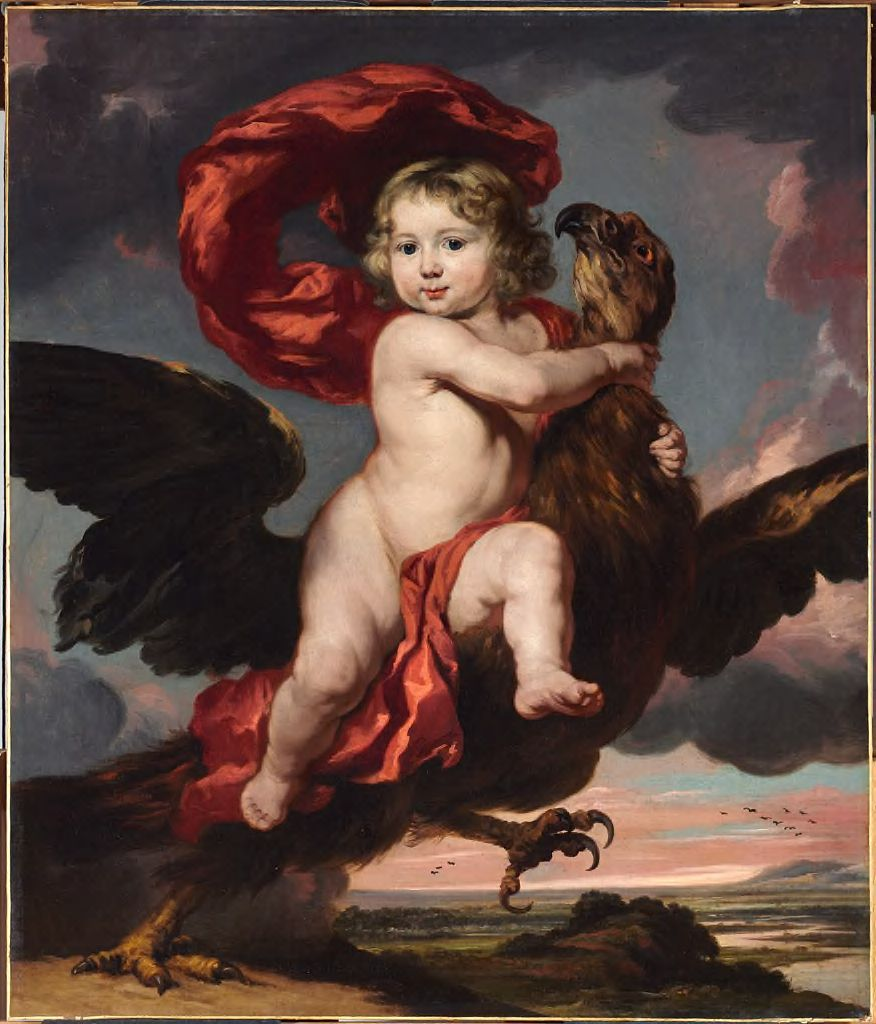
George de Vicq as Ganymede, by Nicolaes Maes, 1681, Fogg Art Museum

Rembrandt's depiction of the reluctant Ganymede should be seen not in the Renaissance context of the homo-erotic catamite theme, but in a relatively new Protestant Baroque interpretation of Ganymede as a beloved child "abducted from life too soon". In the 1670s the painter Nicolaes Maes even made a whole series of paintings of Ganymedes that are considered deathbed portraits of children.

== Related images ==
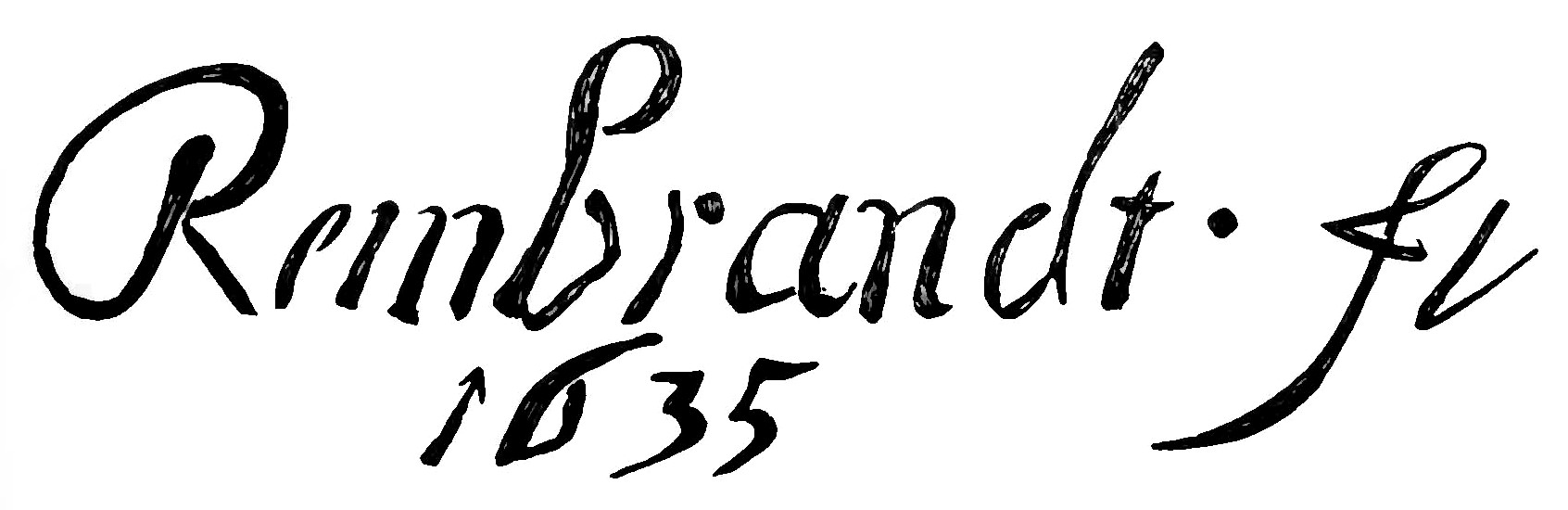
Signature and date as copied from the hem of the boy's shirt by Karl Woermann in his 1887 Dresden catalog

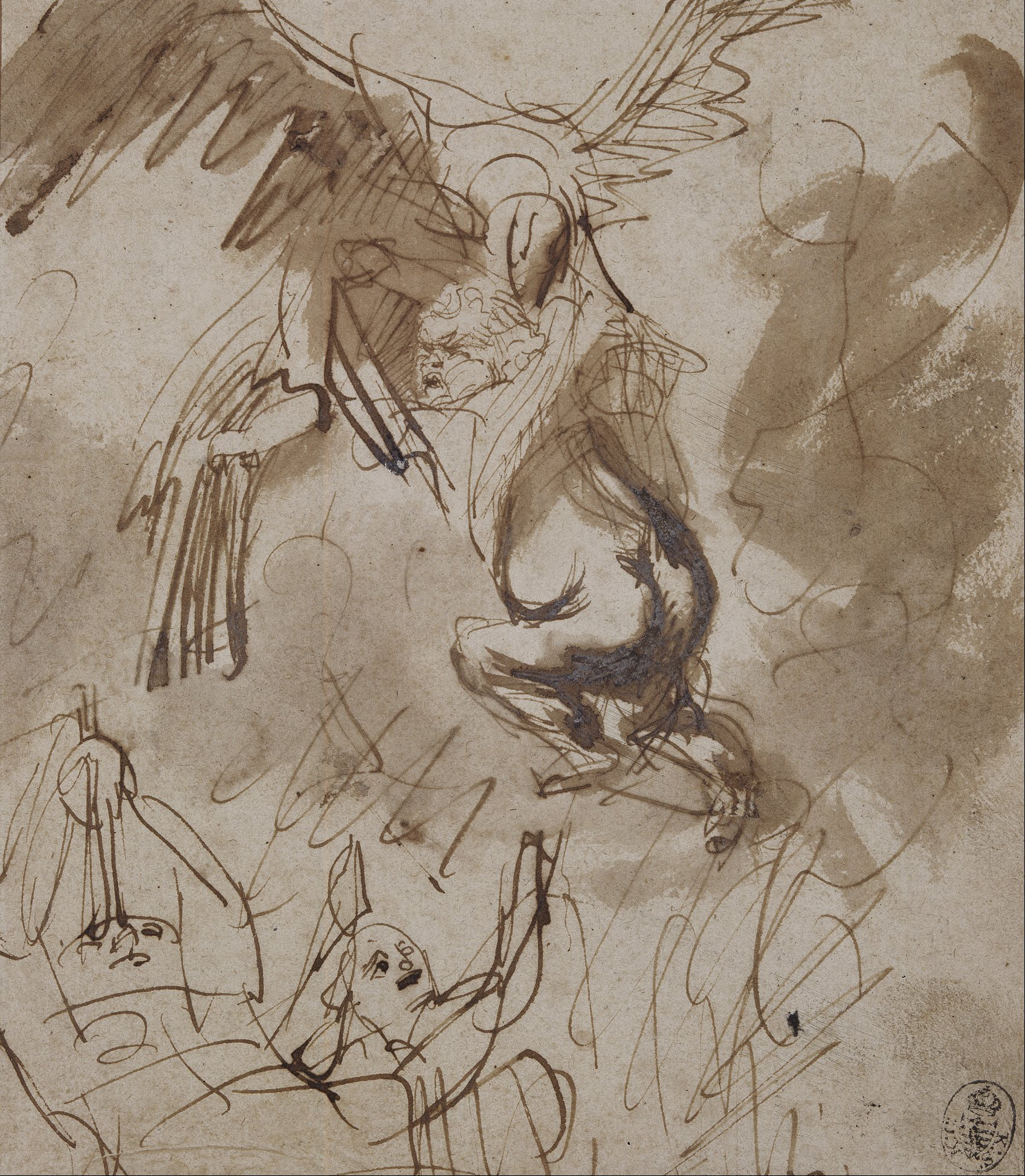
A preparatory sketch by Rembrandt in the Kupferstich-Kabinett, Staatliche Kunstsammlungen Dresden

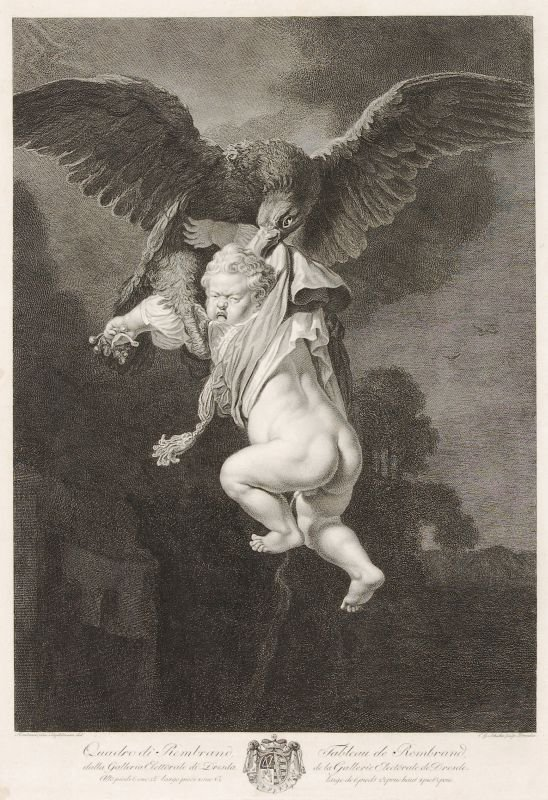
Die Entführung des Ganymed, by Christian Gottfried Schultze, c. 1780 (mentioned by Hofstede de Groot)

An inventory, made on 17 February 1671, of the estate of Catharina van der Pluym, widow of Willem Schilperoort and aunt of Rembrandt's great-nephew and pupil Karel van der Pluym, mentions "een stuck van Ganimedes – f7.- "

== See also ==
- List of paintings by Rembrandt

== Sources ==
- The rape of Ganymede in the RKD's Rembrandt Database
- Ganymede in the eagle's clutches in the Staatliche Kunstsammlungen Dresden
- Ganymed in den Fängen des Adlers in the Marburg Picture Index
- Ganymed in den Fängen des Adlers in the Karl Woermann 1887 catalog on the German Wikisource
