= Eleanor de Laittre =

American artist

- Born: April 3, 1911
- Died: January 9, 1998 (aged 86)
- Education: Boston Museum School; the George Luks Studio; student of George Luks and John Sloan
- Style: Abstract art

Eleanor de Laittre (April 3, 1911 – January 9, 1998) was an American visual artist and an early proponent of abstract, cubist-inspired, and largely non-objective art. During a period when representational art was the norm in the United States, she adhered to a style that was based on her study of paintings by Pablo Picasso, Joan Miró, Paul Klee, and Raoul Dufy. She was a member of American Abstract Artists, a group that flourished during the late 1930s and throughout the 1940s and that included among its members Josef Albers, Ilya Bolotowsky, Werner Drewes, Suzy Frelinghuysen, A.E. Gallatin, Adolph Gottlieb, László Moholy-Nagy, George L.K. Morris, and Ad Reinhardt. In 1939 de Laittre was recognized for her skill in handling the design of a painting she had placed in a group exhibition and was praised in general for her subtle handling of color. Critical appraisal of her work remained positive in the 1940s and early 1950s and toward the end of her career she was honored as one of the best-known artists among those who strove to overcome resistance to abstract art in America.

== Early life and education ==
Following study at a private school in Minneapolis and a boarding school in Washington, D.C., de Laittre entered Smith College as a freshman in 1929. A year later, having become interested in making art, she left Smith to enroll in life and drawing classes at the School of the Museum of Fine Arts, Boston. In 1932 she moved to New York in order to study with George Luks and, after he died in the fall of 1933, with John Sloan at George Luks's studio. Despite this firm grounding in traditional American realism, de Laittre was drawn to an abstract style and looked to French modernism for inspiration. A reviewer found her first exhibited paintings to "betray a fondness" for the style of Paul Cézanne. In 1989 she told an interviewer she that early in her career she had experimented with form in the style of Modigliani, then looked to paintings by Miró and Klee for help in developing a modernist technique, and finally learned simplicity and calligraphic clarity through study of Raoul Dufy.

During the years of the Great Depression, when young artists, particularly female artists, were finding it difficult to attract the attention of gallery owners, de Laittre was able to show her work frequently in New York galleries. In 1933 she participated in two group shows. The first contained paintings by students of the George Luks studio where de Laittre had studied. A reviewer noted that none of the works on display were blatantly imitative and some showed a distinctive approach and methods. Regarding the second exhibition, at the Midtown Gallery, Howard Devree, an art critic of The New York Times, called attention to the quality of her handling of light in a painting of hers called "Aquarium." Regarding a group exhibition in 1934 at the Montross Gallery, that paper's other critic, Edward Alden Jewell, said she "doubtless needs not to be reminded that her work is academic French modernism," which, to him, was not praise. Regarding this show another critic noticed that her work was being repeatedly seen and, indeed, she was included in a second group show that year, this one at the Uptown Gallery. There she was grouped with other young artists including Milton Avery, Oronzo Gasparo, Adolph Gottlieb, Louis Harris, Helen West Heller, Pino Janni, Pietro Lazzari, Mark Rothko, Vincent Spagna, and Geri Pine, as "American expressionists" "who, we are told, have elected to carry on the languishing labors of the École de Paris."

Eleanor de Laittre, "Portrait of a Young Girl," 1939, 17.5 by 16 inches (440 mm × 410 mm), oil on board

In 1934 de Laittre moved to Chicago to marry her first husband, Merrill Shepard. While living there she continued to paint and to participate in annual exhibitions at the Art Institute of Chicago. Eleanor Jewett, the Chicago Tribune's art critic of the time, gave the 1938 show a scathing review. Conforming to a view then common in the United States about the value of abstract art, she gave mock praise to the artists' reckless expressionism and extreme efforts to convey "the intangible" to the viewer. She told her readers, "In the exhibition, you will find repeatedly that the pictures are stirring in you the feeling that you can do as well." She singled out de Laittre's "Holiday for Hats" as "completely fantastic".

Jewett's point of view was not shared by New York critics who continued to see high quality and a growing maturity in de Laittre's work. In 1939 she was given her first solo exhibition. Reviewing this show, at the Contemporary Arts Gallery, the critic for The New York Times praised her sense of design and the good taste she showed in her use of simple colors of low key. All the same, he said it was an "interesting first show, but somewhat tentative in character". The painting, "Portrait of a Young Girl," exhibits qualities cited by the critic.

== Mature style ==
Eleanore de Laittre, "Squares," 1946, 33 by 10 inches (840 mm × 250 mm), oil on canvas

De Laittre returned to New York in 1940 when her husband began graduate studies at Columbia University. She continued to participate in group and solo exhibitions. After receiving his degree in 1943 her husband served as a naval officer in the Pacific Theater and during that time he and she divorced. He returned to Chicago while she remained in New York. At this time de Laittre became a member of American Abstract Artists, a group that had formed a few years earlier to promote and exhibit non-representational art. Speaking for the group, George L.K. Morris argued for acceptance of a "living and expressive" art, acting "through combinations of form and color and line without representing definite objects" and he defended the group's "international" style, evolved out of European modernism, against those who considered it to be un-American.

De Laittre's work first appeared in the group's fifth annual exhibition held at the Riverside Museum in February 1941. Of it Edward Alden Jewell wrote, "Non-objectivity remains the special pursuit of these artists, and non-objectivity means just that: no object, as we look upon object in the world about us. It is a matter of lines and planes and volumes—abstract shapes and forms arranged in a pattern." Along with de Laittre's paintings, the show included works by Fernand Léger and Piet Mondrian and group members, including Josef Albers, Ilya Bolotowsky, Giorgio Cavallon, Arthur N. Christie, Werner Drewes, Suzy Frelinghuysen, A.E. Gallatin, Fritz Glarner, Balcomb Greene, Gertrude Greene, Hananiah Harari, Lee Krasner, Ibram Lassaw, George McNeil, László Moholy-Nagy, George L.K. Morris, Alice Mason, I. Rice Pereira, Ad Reinhardt, Louis Schanker, Charles Green Shaw, Esphyr Slobodkina, Albert Swinden, Robert Jay Wolff, and Jean Xceron.

In the early 1940s de Laittre, Fannie Hillsmith, and Charlotte Cushman would get together to discuss their work. Like de Laittre, Hillsmith had attended the Boston Museum School in the early 1930s and had subsequently moved to New York. Trained by William Zorach and Yasuo Kuniyoshi at the Art Students League, she had cultivated a cubist style reminiscent of Picasso, Miró, and Juan Gris. Cushman had graduated from Smith College when de Laittre was a first-year student there. The two had attended classes at the Boston Museum School together and had moved to New York at the same time. Cushman returned to Boston the following year but rejoined de Laittre in New York in 1940. By then her style, like Hillsmith's was abstract but representational. Although strongly influenced by European modernism, particularly cubism, each established her own individual style. In the late 1930s Cushman had studied sculpture at the Art Students League and in the early 1940s de Laittre took up this medium as well. She took as her instructor Ibram Lassaw, a fellow member of the American Abstract Artists group, and learned from him the techniques of welding steel into complex and highly refined constructions. Her style in this medium was surrealist in the manner of David Hare.

During about 15 years following her return to New York de Laittre showed her paintings frequently with American Abstract Artists and in other shows. Edward Alden Jewell singled out one of her paintings in the sixth exhibition of American Abstract Artists, noting that it had a hint of representation and showed excellent design. A solo exhibition at Chicago's Paul Theobald Gallery drew criticism once again from the Chicago Tribune, this time associating her with Klee, Picasso, and Braque as members of the "surrealist clan". In 1943 she showed at the Puma Gallery, New York, and the critic for The New York Times noted influence of Klee and Picasso (together with Miro rather than Braque). He said her work was not entirely non-objective and that it showed a distinctly personal style. During the 1940s and 1950s critics of The New York Times frequently noted her work with approval and in 1950 said she was one of the best-known American contemporary abstractionists. Her painting, "Squares," of 1946 shows the non-representational style of painting that she exhibited with the American Abstract Artists group.

== Later life and work ==
Eleanor de Laittre, untitled painting, 1949, oil on linen mounted on fiberboard, 12 3/8 by 10 5/8 inches (310 mm × 270 mm), Smithsonian American Art Museum

The New York gallery exhibitions of the 1940s and early 1950s were a high point in de Laittre's career. Thereafter, she continued making sculpture and paintings and in 1989 she appeared in an exhibition at the National Museum of American Art in Washington, D.C. (now the Smithsonian American Art Museum). Called "American Abstraction 1930-1945," the show honored a group of "courageous and talented painters and sculptors", who, a critic said, were unjustly forgotten for their efforts to establish abstract art in the United States "a generation before it finally took hold". This critic pointed to de Laittre's untiled abstract painting of 1949 as being "reminiscent of surrealism but still au courant in the present day".

== Family and personal life ==
Eleanor de Laittre was born in Minneapolis on April 3, 1911. She came from a family whose prosperity stemmed from the business acumen of her grandfather, John De Laittre. He was a lumberman who had come to the forests of Minnesota from Ellsworth, Maine, by way of the California gold fields of the early 1850s. As well as lumbering, he succeeded in manufacturing, flour milling, and banking. He served a term as mayor of St. Paul in the late 1870s and at the time of his death in 1912 was president of the Farmers and Mechanics Savings Bank. Her father, Karl De Laittre, was a lumberman, banker, state legislator, and president of the Minneapolis City Council. He was born in 1874 in Minneapolis and died there in 1957. Her mother, Rosamond Kimball Little DeLaittre (1886-1983), came from Salem, Massachusetts. Her siblings were John, Karl Jr., and Rosamond.

De Laittre attended Northrop Collegiate School in Minneapolis, ca. 1925-1927 and the Madeira School, then in Washington, D.C. She entered Smith College in 1929, but left before graduation to study art, first at the Boston Museum School and then, beginning in 1932, in the studio of George Luks in New York.

On September 29, 1934, de Laittre married Merrill Shepard in Minneapolis. Shepard was born in Winnipeg, Canada, on March 30, 1905, and died in Palisades, New York on January 8, 1986. He lived most of his life in Chicago where he practiced law and was a civic leader. During World War II he served as a naval officer and helped draft the peace treaty with Japan. De Laittre and Shepard lived in Chicago from 1934 to 1940. A news item from this time says they held parties in their apartment which they funded by auctioning paintings made earlier the day of the party by de Laittre and artist acquaintances.

From 1940 to 1943 they lived in New York where Shepard pursued a master's degree at Columbia University. In 1949 he married British actress Brenda Forbes and resumed his law practice in Chicago. At some point between 1941 and the date of his remarriage, Shepard and de Laittre divorced. There were no children from either of Shepard's marriages.

After her divorce from Shepard, de Laittre married Anthony Brown. Born in Brooklyn in 1900, he was a theatrical producer and director best known for producing and staging the play "Tobacco Road which ran on Broadway for a record 3,180 performances. The couple resided in New York. In 1950 they bought a 150-year-old farmhouse with 65 acres of land in Marlboro, Vermont. There, de Laittre made herself a studio where she could paint and construct her welded-steel sculptures. They remained married until his death in Connecticut in 1960. They had no children.

Some time after Brown's death de Laittre married a retired executive with the Standard Oil Company, Paul F. Lienau. He was born in 1902 in Oelwein, Iowa. They lived in Santa Barbara, California, and de Laittre was again widowed when he died in 1984. They had no children.

Following Lienau's death, de Laittre married Robert MacMillan, an author and retired editor at the New Yorker magazine. He was born in 1910 and resided during his working career in New York. He died in 1991 in Santa Barbara, California. MacMillan had previously been married to Cecile Gilmore, a journalist and author of romantic fiction stories and novels. When young, both MacMillan and Gilmore had worked as writers and editors for New York newspapers.

As a professional artist de Laittre used her maiden name. The family name is rendered two ways, most often as "de Laittre," but sometimes as "DeLaittre." News accounts occasionally refer to her by her married names, either using her husband's full name (as in Mrs. Merrill Shepard) or using her own name (e.g., Eleanor de Laittre Brown or Eleanor D. Brown).

== Exhibitions ==
- 1933 Group exhibition, Midtown Gallery, New York
- 1933 Group exhibition, Contemporary Arts Galleries, New York
- 1934 Group exhibition, Montross Gallery, New York
- 1934 Group exhibition, Uptown Gallery of the Continental Club, New York
- 1938 Group exhibition, Art Institute, Chicago
- 1939 Solo exhibition, Contemporary Arts Galleries, New York
- 1941 Group exhibition, American Abstract Artists, Riverside Museum, New York
- 1942 Group exhibition, American Abstract Artists, American Fine Arts Building, New York
- 1942 Solo exhibition, Paul Theobald Gallery, Chicago
- 1943 Solo exhibition, Puma Gallery, New York
- 1943 Group exhibition, Puma Gallery, New York
- 1943 Group exhibition, American-British Art Center, New York
- 1944 Group exhibition, American Abstract Artists, Mortimer Brandt Gallery, New York
- 1945 Group exhibition, American Abstract Artists, Riverside Museum, New York
- 1946 Group exhibition, American Abstract Artists, American-British Art Center, New York
- 1947 Group exhibition, American Abstract Artists, Riverside Museum, New York
- 1950 Group exhibition, Hacker Gallery and Bookshop, New York
- 1952 Group exhibition, American Abstract Artists, New Gallery, New York
- 1952 Group exhibition, Federation of Modern Painters and Sculptors annual, National Arts Club, New York
- 1953 Group exhibition, American Abstract Artists Equity Association, New York
- 1954 Group exhibition, American Abstract Artists, Riverside Museum, New York
- 1956 Group exhibition, American Abstract Artists, Riverside Museum, New York
- 1982 Group exhibition, Diamond Gallery, New York
- 1984 Duo exhibition, Martin Diamond Fine Arts, New York
- 1989 Group exhibition, National Museum of American Art, Washington, D.C.
- 1999 Group exhibition, David Findlay Jr. Inc., New York

== Web Gallery ==
  - Eleanor de Laittre- random artworks
