= Albert Swinden =

American abstract painter

- Born: 1901; Birmingham, England
- Died: 1961 (aged 59–60); New York City, New York, United States
- Known for: Painting
- Movement: Geometric abstraction; Neoplasticism

Albert Swinden (1901–1961) was an English-born American abstract painter. He was one of the founders of the American Abstract Artists, and he created significant murals as part of the Federal Art Project.

== Life ==
Albert Swinden was born in Birmingham, England in 1901. When he was seven, he moved with his family to Canada, and in 1919 he immigrated to the United States. He lived in Chicago, where he studied for about a year and a half at the Art Institute. He then relocated to New York City, where his art education continued briefly at the National Academy of Design. He soon changed schools again, to the Art Students League, which he attended from 1930 to 1934. He studied with Hans Hofmann and gained an appreciation for Synthetic Cubism and Neoplasticism. According to painter and printmaker George McNeil, Swinden "could have influenced Hofmann ... He was working with very, very simple planes, not in this sort of Cubistic manner. Swinden was working synthetically at this time." While still a student, Swinden began teaching at the Art Students League, in 1932.

Swinden married Rebecca Palter (1912–1998), from New York. Their daughter, Alice Swinden Carter, also became an artist. Carter, who attended the School of the Museum of Fine Arts, Boston, received an award from the Institute of Contemporary Art, Boston for her large sculptures.

== Work ==
Swinden was hired for the Federal Art Project (FAP) of the Works Progress Administration (WPA), and he is best known for the murals which he painted as part of that project.

In 1935, New York City Mayor Fiorello La Guardia attended the opening of the inaugural exhibit at the Federal Art Project Gallery, accompanied by Audrey McMahon, New York regional director for the Works Progress Administration/Federal Art Project. Among the works on display was Abstraction, a sketch by Swinden; it was the design for a mural planned for the College of the City of New York. A newspaper account described it as consisting of "brightly colored T-squares, triangles and rulers in horizontal, vertical and diagonal positions". La Guardia asked what it was, and upon being told it was a mural design, he said he didn't know what it depicted. Someone joked that it could be a map of Manhattan. The displeased mayor stated that "if that's art, I belong to Tammany Hall." (Tammany Hall, which the Republican mayor referenced, was the New York Democratic Party political society.) Fearing that the mayor's negative attitude could jeopardize the future of abstract art within the Federal Art Project, McMahon dispatched an assistant to summon an artist who could speak to the mayor in defense of abstraction. The assistant returned with Arshile Gorky.

Swinden played an important role in the founding of the American Abstract Artists. In 1935, he met with three friends, Rosalind Bengelsdorf, her future husband Byron Browne, and Ibram Lassaw, with the goal of exhibiting together. The group grew and started meeting in Swinden's studio, which adjoined those of Balcomb and Gertrude Greene. The A.A.A. evolved in 1937 out of these meetings among twenty-two artists.

One of the artists attending those meetings was painter John Opper, who said in an interview that Swinden was very quiet, shy, and inhibited. He also said that Swinden was one of the best painters in the group. "His paintings were very powerful, very strong. You would think he would be one of those robust persons like Gorky, for instance. But he was the opposite of Gorky. He was very withdrawn." Around this time, Swinden may have painted abstracts exclusively. But later, according to Irving Sandler, "it was sort of a mixture between figurative and geometric abstraction. It was a kind of hard-edge figure towards the end."

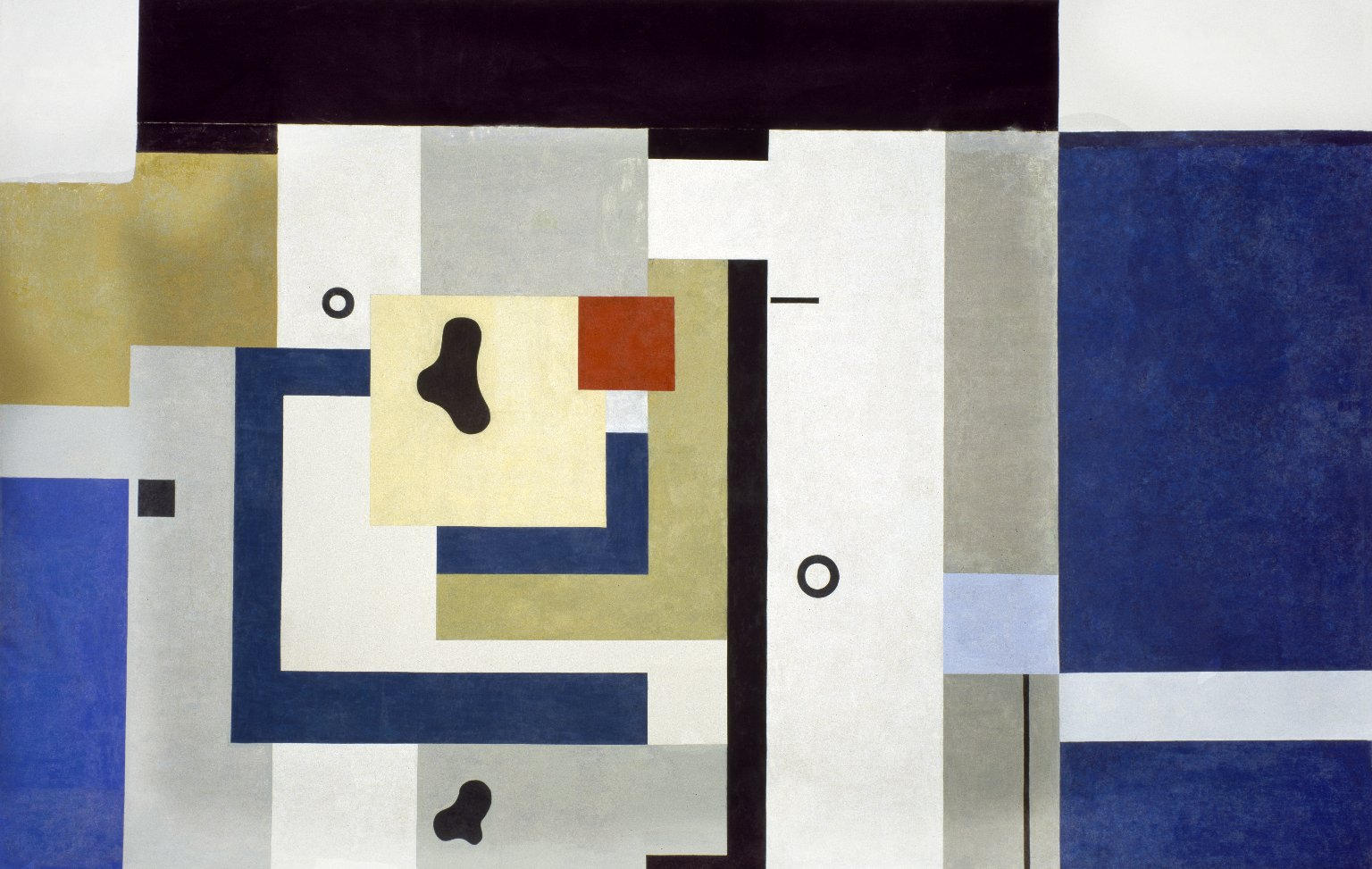
Untitled, from the Williamsburg Housing Project Murals

Burgoyne Diller selected Swinden to create a mural for Brooklyn's Williamsburg Housing Project. The other artists chosen for this project were Paul Kelpe, who painted two murals, and Ilya Bolotowsky and Balcomb Greene, each of whom created one. The murals were commissioned in 1936 by the Mural Division of the WPA/FAP in New York. Diller headed the Mural Division.

Swinden's large – 9.31 by 14.36 feet (2.84 m × 4.38 m) – untitled abstract mural has been described as a "carefully balanced, disciplined composition of rectangular shapes punctuated by occasional biomorphic forms". He was not able to execute the mural exactly as he had originally conceptualized, due to constraints of the installation space; for example, the unpainted upper corners which were inserted during restoration are where structural beams were present at the Williamsburg site. The black strip at the top and the broken blue one on the right were probably also changes made due to requirements of using the particular space.

The murals, owned by the New York City Housing Authority, are on loan to the Brooklyn Museum. These five paintings were the first abstract murals anywhere in the United States, and they're considered to be some of the most significant. Art historians have praised the murals as "extremely important artworks, quite courageous and extraordinary ... painted in the most radical style you could get at the time", "key to American art between the wars", and "national treasures".

Among the other murals he created was one for the 1939 New York World's Fair.

Although he did not often write about his art, a short essay of his was published in the American Abstract Artists Yearbook of 1938. This yearbook featured, among other things, essays such as Swinden's which expounded on theories and practices of abstract art. In his essay, "On Simplification", Swinden wrote: "We are moved not only by particular, or individual forms, but by the relationships between the particular forms and their significance as a unity."

A 1940 fire at Swinden's studio destroyed the majority of his early work. His mural for the Williamsburg Project, which had been painted over and considered lost before being rediscovered and restored, is a rare and very significant painting from the period before the fire.

In a 1942 review of the American Abstract Artists' sixth annual exhibition, influential art critic Clement Greenberg wrote that among the "geometricians", Swinden "shows as much promise perhaps in his single unsuccessful painting as the others in their successful ones."

Although he was respected by the prominent artists he associated with, had his paintings exhibited in many group shows (including such prestigious venues as the Museum of Modern Art, the Solomon R. Guggenheim Museum and the Whitney Museum of American Art), and created significant murals, he was not able to promote his art in a commercially successful way. Instead, he often had to work in other capacities, supporting himself as an engineering draftsman or a textile designer.

He died in 1961 in New York City. In 1962, a retrospective exhibit of his work was mounted at New York's Graham Gallery. Swinden left behind a relatively small oeuvre of "calmly classical visions".

== Collections ==
Museums with Swinden's work in their permanent collections include:

- Brooklyn Museum
- Carnegie Museum of Art, Pittsburgh, Pennsylvania
- Fogg Museum, Cambridge, Massachusetts
- Museum of Fine Arts, Boston
- New Jersey State Museum, Trenton, New Jersey
- Sheldon Museum of Art, Lincoln, Nebraska
- Smithsonian American Art Museum, Washington, D.C.
- Whitney Museum of American Art, New York City
