= John Opper =

American painter

- Born: John Samuel Opper; October 29, 1908; Chicago, Illinois
- Died: October 4, 1994 (aged 85); New York City, New York
- Resting place: Green River Cemetery

John Opper (1908–1994) was an American painter who transitioned from semi-abstract paintings in the late 1930s to fully abstract ones in the 1950s. He became known for his handling of color and in particular his ability to create dramatic intensity on the picture plane by means of juxtaposed, more-or-less rectangular areas of color. He was associated with the abstract expressionist movement and frequently showed in galleries that specialized in abstract expressionist art. Late in life, he described his style by what it was not. He said, "The whole is the sum of its parts. That's what my school of abstract art is about, a school that evolved from nature, not conceptual, not geometric, not hard-edged. It's only art."

== Early life and training ==
Opper was born in Chicago, Illinois, and raised in Cleveland, Ohio. He became interested in drawing at a young age. While in high school he took art classes and enrolled in a correspondence art course. In his senior year he attended classes at the Cleveland Museum of Art. Graduating about 1926 he briefly studied at the Cleveland School of Art and there encountered the artists Henry Keller, as an instructor, and Clarence Carter, as a fellow student. He spent the following year in Chicago taking classes at the Art Institute and subsequently returned to Cleveland where he enrolled at Western Reserve University, graduating in 1932. Two years later he spent a summer in Gloucester, Massachusetts. (Note: In about 1930 modernist artist, Ernest Thurn, established a summer art school in Gloucester. In 1933 Thurn invited Hans Hofmann to teach for a session. Returning again the next summer, Hofmann taught in the session which Opper attended. Later that year he set up his own school in Manhattan.) There, he met Hans Hofmann, who was teaching at the Thurn School of Art. Hofmann influenced his approach to art, although not as an instructor. (Note: In a casual meeting, Hofmann said he had a good sense of color and should try to paint in a less academic style.) In 1934 Opper moved to Manhattan and a year later began to work in the studio that Hofmann had set up as the School of Fine Arts on East 57th Street. (Note: "year later,""1934," "School) There he met modernist painters who sought Hofmann's guidance and began to develop his own modernist style. (Note: The other painters he met at Hofmann's school included including Byron Browne, Rosalind Bengelsdorf, George McNeil, Mercedes Carles, Giorgio Cavallon, and Wilfrid Zogbaum.)

== Career in art ==
In 1936 Opper became a founding member of American Abstract Artists, a group formed by New York artists to promote and exhibit a style of art that was then derided by critics and shunned by collectors. In 1937 the influential critic, Edward Alden Jewell, called this effort a "revolt against literary subject-paintings" and said that the great majority of paintings in a current exhibition were simply "objects." (Note: "objects," "influential") The same year, after a brief attempt to support himself as an art instructor, Opper joined the Federal Art Project in Manhattan as an easel artist and remained for three years. He later said that the project was a lifesaver for impoverished artists, particularly abstract artists such as himself. At the same time, he joined the Artists Union and became business manager of its journal, Art Front. (Note: The Artists Union was an offshoot of the New York John Reed Club. It arose as a Depression-era effort by city artists to obtain government funded work the great number of them who were unemployed. The Federal Art Project itself and its unusually generous wages and working conditions resulted largely from this effort. The union was radical in its social views and combative in its methods.Art Front was the public face of its radicalism and pugnacity.) Within the year, Opper left the Artists Union and joined the American Artists' Congress. (Note: The American Artists' Congress was a nation-wide organization to help artists cope with the effects of the Great Depression and to show common cause with other organizations in opposition to fascism and threat of war. Like the Artists Union it was an offshoot of the John Reed Clubs. However it was more moderate than the union both in its objectives and its actions. Membership was limited to "artists of standing" as determined by the executive committee. It held group exhibitions in New York and other major cities. Unwillingly tangled in international politics, particularly with respect to the Soviet invasion of Finland in 1939, the group lost its impetus and gradually declined.) He grew disenchanted with this organization, in turn, and left it after submitting work to two of its group exhibitions. By his account, during these two years his work was both semi-abstract and anti-war.

Opper was given his first solo exhibition at the Artists Gallery in 1937. (Note: Founded by Hugh S. Stix in 1936 and run by Frederica Beer, the Artists Gallery was supported by donations and charged no fees on artists' sales.) The water colors and temperas he showed drew favorable comment from Howard Devree, critic for the New York Times, who said his realist and semi-abstract landscapes were vigorous, germane, and expressive and from Jerome Klein of the New York Post, who commended Opper's "sparkling brilliance and unfailing vivacity." (Note: "Devree," "Klein") Before leaving the Artists' Congress he helped organize its fourth annual exhibition in 1940. Entitled "Art in a Democracy," the show featured artists across the country who worked in the Federal Art Project. Writing in the New York Times, Edward Alden Jewell said it was "cluttered with shrillness and posturing and ineptitude," but A. Z. Kruse of the Brooklyn Eagle wrote that he was overwhelmed by its overall high quality, saying "there are too many noteworthy contributions to permit of enumeration and evaluation." (Note: "Times," "Eagle") The Congress was then torn by dissension and on its last legs. Opper had come to the conclusion that he could not create art as a means of correcting society's ills. He later said, "I was torn between the needs of the society and the needs of the war on one hand, and on the other hand what I felt were aesthetic needs of painting. So finally the only solution that I was able to make for myself was to begin to separate the two. I was quite active socially, as much as I could be. And as far as my paintings were concerned I began to abstract from nature and work very abstractly."

He took on war-related work between 1942 and 1945 and produced less art than he had in the 1930s. Nonetheless, he contributed to group exhibitions during this time and in 1942 was given another well-received solo exhibition at the Artists Gallery. Although he spent most of the post-war period in teaching positions outside New York, he was able both to continue painting and to show the works he made. In 1947, the curator of modern painting at the Art Institute of Chicago, Katharine Kuh, took one of his paintings for a show called "Abstract and Surrealist American Art." Presenting a cross-section of modernist American painting and sculpture, the exhibition uncovered an abstractionist movement that was then beginning to gain momentum, particularly in New York. (Note: In putting together the show, Kuh and co-curator Frederick S. Sweet spent months crisscrossing the country to select works that fairly represented the maturity toward which the abstractionist movement was then striving. On one of her trips she traveled to Laramie, Wyoming, where Opper was teaching, in order to examine and select a painting of his for the exhibition.) In 1953 Opper participated in a group show held at a New York commercial gallery and in 1955 he was the last of a series of abstract expressionist artists to be given solo exhibitions at the Egan Gallery. (Note: Charles Egan operated his gallery for a decade following the close of World War II. He gave Willem de Kooning his first solo exhibition in 1948 and, over the years, showed many of the abstract expressionist artists of the time.) In reviewing the show, a critic said Opper's painting "exemplified with gusto the leading contemporary abstract trends in its brushfuls of richly stirred color applied in shaggy strokes and sharp accents."

From the beginning of the 1960s until the beginning of the 1990s, Opper showed frequently in solo exhibitions and in group shows. In 1961 and 1962 he was given solo exhibitions at the Stable Gallery, leading one critic to note "abstract seas of luminous color" in his paintings and another to lament the inadequacy of language to convey the paintings' visual impact. (Note: The Stable Gallery opened in a former stable in Manhattan in 1953. It became known for a series of controversial exhibitions, called "Stable Annuals," in which the work of contemporary American artists such as Jackson Pollock, Willem de Kooning, Robert Indiana, Robert Motherwell, and Robert Rauschenberg. Its owner, Eleanor Ward, closed the gallery in 1970 out of dissatisfaction with the commercialism of the Manhattan art scene.) In 1966 Opper began an association with the Grace Borgenicht Gallery which lasted into the 1990s. (Note: The Borgenicht Gallery opened in Manhattan in 1951 aiming to exhibit works by contemporary artists. At first it represented American painters such as Milton Avery, Stuart Davis, Leonard Baskin and Ilya Bolotowsky, and later added artists from outside the U.S. including José de Rivera and Jean Arp. Its owner was artist, Grace Borgenicht Brandt (1915-2001). The gallery closed in 1995.) Many of his appearances in that gallery were solo exhibitions that were reviewed by critics of the New York Times (1966, Grace Glueck; 1968 and 1971, John Canaday; and 1973, 1974 and 1979 Hilton Kramer). In 1978 the Montclair Art Museum paired Opper's paintings with those of another abstract expressionist, James Brooks, in a show that a Times critic called "outstanding." In 1989, 1990, and 1997 his work appeared in retrospective exhibitions at the Cleveland Institute of Art and in galleries in Sarasota, Florida, and East Hampton, Long Island.

=== Artistic style and critical reception ===
During the 1930s and 1940s Opper painted mainly on paper in water-colors and gouache. He also used oil on canvas and made some lithographic prints. During the 1950s oils predominate and thereafter acrylics on canvas or paper. His works are mostly easel-size or, if larger, small enough to be painted from a stationary position. As one critic said, "Like de Kooning, Opper preferred to work within his arm's reach."

His early training gave him excellent technical facility. An able draftsman, he could create realistic depictions of natural subjects, particularly still lifes. However, he did not enjoy the work and, after seeing semi-abstract and abstract works by European artists and after meeting with American artists who were experimenting along these lines, he expanded his range and began to make semi-abstractions. In a 1968 oral history interview he said paintings by Paul Cézanne and Milton Avery impressed him, but he found greatest influence in work by Henri Matisse and John Marin. Following Marin, he began to make works on paper, particularly seascapes and landscapes. His response to Matisse was more complicated. In a 1990 interview he said, "Here were these marvelous paintings, so simple a child could do them. What an amazing thing that is! Simplicity is the hardest thing in the world to do. All you leave is the guts. You take everything else out."

During the time he worked in the Federal Art Project, he tried his hand at social realism, taking a lead from artists such as José Clemente Orozco, but, as noted above, after a year or so came to believe that making art and acting to correct societal injustice were two separate matters.

John Opper, Untitled, oil on canvas, 1935, 24 x 18 inches. Smithsonian Art Museum

John Opper, Untitled, mixed media on paper mounted on board, 1950, 25 1/2 x 20 inches

Among the artists he met in the Artists Union there were several who shared Opper's doubts concerning social realism. Balcomb Greene, who, in 1936 became the first chairman of American Abstract Artists, provided one such influence in the direction of abstractionism. As Opper put it, "he was one of the first to argue that there is probably something in art besides the image that you show." Another motivation for his transition to abstractionism came from his feeling for color. During the time that his work was still representational, the reviews he received in New York newspapers noted his facility in handling color. (Note: See for example, Edward Alden Jewel in the Times, Jerome Klein in the Post, Howard Devree in the Times, and an anonymous critic in the Post) He later explained that some of his motivation for abandoning representation came partly from his feeling for color. In 1968 he said, "the more I became aware of color and design the more I came in conflict with the object that I was painting. So it soon became a problem either I let the color go — and keep the composition as it should be, naturalistically or representationally — or I should take freedom with color and design."

As he began to work in an abstractionist style Opper began to see a division between artists who took a more rational, carefully planned approach to their work and ones whose work was more intuitive. As he saw it, on the one side were the geometric abstractionists who tended to show the influence of Picasso and who made neat and clean, clearly defined art, and on the other side were those who tended to show the influence of Matisse and who made art in a freer, looser style, showing greater warmth.

At the end of the 1930s Opper was making a transition from representational to semi-abstract paintings. His transition from semi- to pure abstraction was slowed during three years that he spent making technical drawings for a marine architectural firm during the Second World War. Nonetheless, he continued to exhibit during these years and was becoming known for his oils in addition to the water colors.

John Opper, YRG 20, acrylic on canvas, c. 1970, 28 x 28 inches

When Opper took a teaching job in North Carolina following the war, he was able to spend more time painting and his style shifted from semi-abstract to fully abstract. In the 1960s, looking back on this period, he said, his painting had "more abstract expressionism in it than anything." At the end of the 1940s, a move to Wyoming for another teaching position, led him to work, he later said, in "a kind of abstract style from nature." He went on to explain, "You could only recognize it as from nature in the sense that there was a form that was maybe a mountain, a big shape." During a subsequent move to another teaching position, this time in Alabama, he later said he was working in highly simplified forms that he saw as "close to Matisse in quality."

He was of two minds about these extended periods of time he spent away from the emerging abstract expressionist art scene in Manhattan. He missed the productive ambiance that he experienced when he mixed socially with other experimental artists, but on the other hand he was uncomfortable with the competition for recognition in that environment. He later reported that he "wasn't a natural self-promoter. And I thought I'd be sore as hell to be on that scene."

John Opper, Untitled, acrylic on Arches France paper, 1976, 30 3/8 × 22 3/8 inches. Estate of John Opper

John Opper, Untitled, acrylic on canvas, 1981, 44 x 44 inches

As his work became more abstract, he changed his palette. Where before he had used colors that appear in nature, he began to juxtapose bright, intense colors against one another. In the early 1970s a critic noted that the focus of Opper's paintings was "the optical pleasure of pure color." Where his earlier abstractions had conveyed a sense of space, his paintings from the early 1950s onward used areas of color to effect a two-dimensional means of creating dramatic intensity on the picture plane. Of this approach to his work Opper said: "I was trying to paint a painting where you would not be aware of the painterliness, you would not be aware of the unusual – anything about that painting except the painting. And this is I think the absence of anything that had a flair or that showed a certain kind of competency of technique." One critic referred to Opper's use of "peninsular shapes that reach out into abstract seas of luminous color."

In 1978 David L. Shirley, writing in the New York Times, called attention to the rigor and visual control evident in Opper's work and said "he distilled his visual vocabulary to the simplest common denominator, with forms carefully locked into a tight relationship with one another." Ten years earlier, in an oral history session with Irving Sandler, Opper commented on the effort that underlay this rigor and control. He said ""I think after all any mature painter — and I hope I am one — doesn’t show the agonies that he goes through any more than you do in your writing. But, you know, it doesn’t come easy. But it has to look as though it came easy." This is not to say that Opper made careful plans before beginning a painting. He did not start even with an idea, but rather made a beginning and responded to his instincts about the painting as it progressed. In 1990 he said: "I start and as it changes, I change. As it demands, I try to fulfill it. If you're very sensitive to what you're doing, if one area doesn't work, it's because some other area doesn't work. The whole is the sum of its parts. That's what my school of abstract art is about, a school that evolved from nature, not conceptual, not geometric, not hard-edged. It's only art."

== Career in teaching ==
At age 24, when his studies at Western Reserve were coming to an end, Opper got a job as a part-time art instructor at Karamu House, a Cleveland settlement house school. Having moved to Manhattan he obtained a similar job at a school for delinquents. At the close of World War II he spent a year teaching at the University of North Carolina Woman's College in Greensboro (now the University of North Carolina at Greensboro). Between 1945 and 1947 he taught at the University of Wyoming; and between 1947 and 1949 at the University of Alabama.

From 1949 to 1952 he taught at Teachers College, Columbia University, while he studied for a doctor of education degree at the university. Concurrently, he taught evening classes at Pratt Institute. In the summer of 1952 he returned to North Carolina as an artist-in-residence at the Burnsville School of Fine Arts, a college campus of the Woman's College UNC, located in the mountains. That fall he moved back to Woman's College UNC in Greensboro as an associate professor. From 1957 until he retired in 1974, he was a professor of art at New York University.

Notable students of Opper included painter Lee Hall.

== Personal life and family ==
Opper's birth name was John Samuel Opper. He was born on October 29, 1908, in Chicago, Illinois, to Joseph (or Joe) Opper (1885-1947) and his wife Mary Milstein Opper (1887-1968). Both parents were born in Kiev, Ukraine. Opper had one brother, Leon Jay Opper (1918-1992) and three sisters, Ann Opper Waldman (1906-1997), Carrie Opper Cohen (1910-1967), and Sylvia Opper Brandt (1916-1999). In 1934 Opper married Estelle Rita Hausman in Manhattan. They remained married until their deaths 60 years later. She had been born in Cleveland, Ohio, in 1910, and like him, died in 1994. They had one daughter, Jane Opper, and one son, Joseph Opper.

Between 1941 and 1945 Opper worked for a marine architectural company making pipe system drawings of PT boats.

After retiring from NYU in 1974 Opper spent summers in Amagansett, Long Island, and the colder months in Greenwich Village. Beginning in 1989 he spent most of the year in Sarasota, Florida, while continuing to spend summers on Long Island.

Opper died in New York City on October 4, 1994, and is buried in East Hampton's Green River Cemetery.

== Public museum collections ==
- Blanton Museum of Art, The University of Texas at Austin, Texas
- The Cleveland Museum of Art, Cleveland, Ohio
- Grey Art Gallery, New York University, New York, New York
- The Metropolitan Museum of Art, New York, New York
- Milwaukee Art Museum, Milwaukee, Wisconsin
- Museum of Modern Art, New York, New York
- Parrish Art Museum, Watermill, New York
- Smithsonian American Art Museum, Washington DC
- Weatherspoon Art Museum, University of North Carolina, Greensboro, North Carolina
- Whitney Museum of American Art, New York, New York
