= Harry Holtzman =

American artist

- Holtzman, New York City, 1941
- Born: June 8, 1912; New York, New York
- Died: September 25, 1987 (aged 75); Lyme, Connecticut
- Known for: Painting
- Movement: Abstract Art
- Spouse: Elizabeth McManus Holtzman

Harry Holtzman (June 8, 1912 – September 25, 1987) was an American artist and founding member of the American Abstract Artists group.

== Early life ==
At the age of fourteen, Holtzman visited the Société Anonyme’s 1926 “International Exhibition of Modern Art” at the Brooklyn Museum and developed an early interest in advanced art with the guidance and encouragement of a high school teacher.

At sixteen, in 1928, he began attending the Art Students League of New York and became an active participant in League activities, serving as a monitor and contributing to the quarterly magazine. At a membership meeting in early 1932, Holtzman’s remarks against the xenophobia of the League’s director were instrumental in carrying a membership vote that brought George Grosz and Hans Hofmann to teach at the League. At the close of this meeting, Burgoyne Diller, a Hofmann protégé, taken by Holtzman’s independence of mind, introduced himself, beginning an important lasting relationship. (1)(5)(8)(9)

In this period and working directly from the nude Harry Holtzman produced a wide corpus of drawings that reveals a progressive evolution towards abstraction, expressing his clearly understanding of the Cézanne's lesson.(1)(3)

Step by step his work, using his own words, become " absolutely pure, very much in a kind of expressionist so called abstract expressionism vene" (3) Harry Holtzman was part of the first exhibition of abstract art organized at the Art Student League, with B.Diller, Albert Swinden, Albert Wilkenson. (1)

From 1933 the Abstract research of the artist evolves then into a series of rectilinear works, basically an independent abstraction from external objects, an important work of this period is 'Dynamic Equilibrium of Movement and Contromovement'(#661 Estate of Harry Holtzman).

An untitled gouache painting of the same year (# 606 Estate of Harry Holtzman) shows the carried on argument with Diller over whether circular forms could be integrated into a grid arrangement without seeming to be indiscreet and arbitrary, from this discussion Harry Holtzman decided they could not. (9)(11)

By January 1934, Holtzman recalls,

“...in my completely independent development I’d struck in a direction, which without knowing it, was taking me in a direction similar to Mondrian. One day Diller was seeing some works in my studio... He asked me if I had seen the recently opened Museum of Living Art (A.E. Gallatin’s collection at the New York University library on Washington Square. I hadn’t. I went. This was the first clue I had to Mondrian’s perception, the two paintings that Gallatin had acquired...” (3)

In the ensuing months, Holtzman

“became obsessed with not only the paintings of Mondrian, but with the idea that the man had to think certain things about historical transformation, the values and functions of art. I really had to go to Europe to speak with him.” (3)

By the end of November, Holtzman had raised enough money to pay for passage to France. In mid-December he introduced himself to Mondrian in the Dutch artist’s Paris studio. Despite a language barrier and an age difference of forty years, the two men became good friends during the four months of Holtzman’s stay in Paris.

When Holtzman returned to New York City in 1935, he joined the WPA Federal Art project, but was first assigned to write for the public relations department, since his art was considered too extreme for public placement. When Diller was promoted as managing supervisor of the Mural Division in New York, he appointed Holtzman as his assistant supervisor in charge of the abstract mural painters. In 1936 Holtzman was instrumental in bringing together the nucleus of painters and sculptors who established the American Abstract Artists in 1937. Although he opposed the group’s emphasis on exhibitions, and the attempts of certain influential members to exclude all but “pure-abstractionists”, Holtzman maintained an active role for several years, serving as secretary in 1938 and again in 1940 and arranged for the three-week AAA exhibition and its educational component at the American Art Today Building of the New York World’s Fair in 1940, directed by Holger Cahill.

== New York during WWII ==
During the German Blitz of London in 1940, Holtzman arranged for Mondrian to come to New York, where he arrived that October. Holtzman rented an apartment-studio for him, and during the next three and a half years he was one of Mondrian’s most intimate associates. (1)(2)

Of a painting construction (Sculpture 1941) by Harry Holtzman now in the collection of the Yale University Art Gallery, Piet Mondrian commented: “In the present three dimensional works of H.H. (Harry Holtzman) the picture moves still more from the wall into our surrounding space. In this way the painting more literally annihilates the three dimensional volume.” (letter to Harry Holtzman 6 1 1942 cited by Daniel Abadie in the catalogue 'Paris New York Paris', Paris Musee National d'Art Moderne Centre Georges Pompidou 1977) (2)(4) The piece, included in the "Spring Salon for Young Artists" (18 May - 26 June 1943) at the Art of This Century gallery in New York, was also shown in the Maya Deren's film "Witch's Cradle" filmed at the AoTC during the August 1943.

Holtzman was associated with the Atelier 17 printmaking studio.

According to Nancy J. Troy Holtzman's sculptures are akin to works by European and American artists who sought to apply Mondrian's principle of Neoplasticism into the three dimensions. Cesar Domela, Jean Gorin, B Diller, worked out from the painted surface but still adhering to that surface for their overall concept. Harry Holtzman set out in a new direction by working in the round. (4)

As executor of Mondrian’s Estate, Holtzman continued his involvement with Mondrian’s art and in 1983 he co-edited a volume of Mondrian’s complete essays. (1)(8)

== Post-war ==
In 1947, Holtzman became a faculty member of the Institute for General Semantics, where he taught with Alfred Korzybski until 1954. Later he edited the journal Trans/Formation: Arts, Communications, Environment. (1)

Since 1957, Harry Holtzman, visited the Asian continent documenting its life and culture and gathering an important photographic documentation, relevant both from the artistic and ethnographic point of view. Some of his best photographs relating to the Village Gods of South India were selected by Stella Kramrisch for the catalogue and exhibition "Unknown India ritual art in tribe and village" (Philadelphia Museum of Fine Art 1968). The Museum of Modern Art of New York included in 1962 some of his photographs of Le Corbusier's Villa Shodhan in the circulating exhibition: The Twentieth Century House. (1)

The evolution of the artistic research of Harry Holtzman of these decades led him to illustrate semanticim's theory of the interrelation of symbolization and perception in some of his works. The result of this long research was a series of "open reliefs": free standing structures painted to stimulate the visual interchange between the rectilinear solids and the voids as they were shaped by the solids, representing in their interaction the movement and space in viable experience. (1)(9)(11)(15)(16)

These final works were exhibited in public for the first time three years after the death of Harry Holtzman, in 1990 at the Washburn Gallery of New York. (12)

For many years he participated in the conferences of the National Committee on Art Education of The Museum of Modern Art, and from 1950 to 1975 he was a faculty member of the art department at Brooklyn College, City University of New York. (1)

Holtzman lived and worked in Lyme, Connecticut. He is survived by his three triplet children, Madalena Holtzman, Jackie Holtzman and Jason Holtzman. (10)

== Legacy ==
Selected works of the Artist are present in the permanent collections of the Whitney Museum of American Art, New York (Square volume with green, 1936); San Francisco Museum of Modern Art (Horizontal Volume, 1938-1946) ; Carnegie Museum of Art, Pittsburgh (Sculpture I, 1940; Lateral Volume No. 1, 1939-40); Société Anonyme Yale University Art Gallery (Sculpture 1941–1942; Lateral Volume No. 2, 1940); Florence Griswold Museum, Old Lyme, CT; Beineke Rare Book and Manuscript Library Yale University, New Haven, CT.

In 2013, the Florence Griswold Museum in Old Lyme, Connecticut presented "Harry Holtzman and American Abstraction", a retrospective of Holtzman's work divided into three periods: Early Abstractions (1928–1934), Pure Plastic Painting (1934–1950), and The First Paintings in History (1950–1987). (13)(14)

In 2014 Harry Holtzman and George L.K. Morris, founding members of the American Abstract Artists are paired in an intimate 2-man exhibit, curated by Kinney Frelinghuysen and Madalena Holtzman, and designed to evoke an informal conversation between the two artists. George L.K. Morris Harry Holtzman Pioneers of American Modernism: Points of Contact. Essays by T. Kinney Frelinghuysen, Madalena Holtzman, Wietse Coppes. Catalogue published on the occasion of the exhibition from June 26 to October 12, 2014, at the Frelinghuysen Morris House and Studio, Lenox, Massachusetts. This exhibition marks also the beginning of a collaboration between the Estates of George L.K. Morris and Harry Holtzman, with support of the RKD - Netherlands Institute for Art History. The collaboration aims at sharing, editing and exhibiting new historical materials related and connected to the world of abstract art of the seminal period of the 1930s and 1940s in Europe and in the US. For this reason in this first show will be present also the works of other European protagonists of the time like Jean Hélion, Cesar Domela, and Ben Nicholson. A project, that duly enlarged and in the details curated will be evolving into a wider exhibition initiative.

3 Interviews: Thelonious Monk/T.S. Monk, Nicholas Fox Weber, Joop Joosten, by Harry Holtzman and Madalena Holtzman, edited by Wietse Coppes Rkd Netherlands Institute for Art History 2014 provide more insight into the seminal period of the early abstraction in Europe and USA.

In 2014 the Mondrian-edition-project of the RKD - Netherlands Institute for Art History encompasses the scientific, multi-lingual edition of all the correspondence and theoretical and literary writings by the Dutch artist Piet Mondrian (1872–1944). The first part of the project (2014–2015) will focus on the correspondence with his friend Harry Holtzman (1912–1987). This work, in collaboration with Madalena Holtzman will be published in 2015, along with Mondrians manuscript 'The Necessity of A New Teaching in Art, Architecture and Industrie'.

== From-MOMA show-’95-’96-catalogue ==
- 1939: After England declares war on September 3, 1939, Mondrian flees his studio in Hampstead and stays with Ben Nicolson and Barbara Hepworth in Cornwall, where they have just fled. Holtzman writes from New York insisting that he come, sending money and promising to find lodgings.
- 1940: June 26, Dutch passport stamped with exemption from military service and permission to leave the country.
- August: with Holtzman’s help, he receives an American visa. As soon as Mondrian gets a place in the Dutch immigration quota, he packs his paintings and sends them to America.
- September 9: two days after the blitz begins, a bomb hits the other side of Parkhill Road several houses away, breaking his windows and thus forcing him to leave. For the rest of the time he lives at the Ormonde Hotel in London.
- September 13: writes farewell letters to Nicholson, Hepworth, and Winfred Nicholson.
- September 21: boards ship in Liverpool, but does not leave until two days later because of the blitz.
- October 3, 1940: Mondrian arrives in New York: Holtzman is waiting on the pier and takes him to the Beekman tower on east 49th St., where Mondrian spends his first few days. Knowing his passion for jazz, Holtzman almost immediately plays some recordings of boogie-woogie music, a rhythmically propulsive form of piano blues then enjoying a popular revival, which Mondrian, Holtzman will recall, finds “Enormous, enormous”.

Holtzman takes Mondrian to his summer home in the Berkshires to recuperate from the journey, then finds him an apartment on the third floor of 353 East 56th st., on the corner of first ave. Holtzman will pay the rent and buy him a bed and after Mondrian resists for several months, a record player.

p.2-hh-new art-new-life:

p.5-6-hh-new-art-new-life:bottom… In New York, unless I was away from the city, we saw each other almost every day to discuss our work and ideas. It was also my privilege to help Mondrian put his writing into “correct” English.

Although I have no direct knowledge, early photos and self-portraits of Holtzman show him as somewhat romantic in appearance, then dapper, energetic, proud and lively. Mondrian was among the first in Europe to write about the importance to modern culture of black American jazz and its dances, which he thoroughly enjoyed until the end of his life. In Paris he had a large collection of jazz discs. On the night Mondrian arrived in New York, I introduced him to the boogie-woogie piano music of Ammons, Johnson, and Lewis. His response was immediate, he clasped his hands together with obvious pleasure, “Enormous! Enormous!” he repeated. He often went with me and others to enjoy what he called a “dancing party.” Nobody has ever written more brilliantly about the symbolic ambiance of the night club. (“Jazz and Neoplastic”,1927).

1944:

Dines with Holtzman on 19 January. The two have lately been discussing plans for an ideal nightclub."
