= Emily Mason (painter) =

American painter and printmaker (1932–2019)

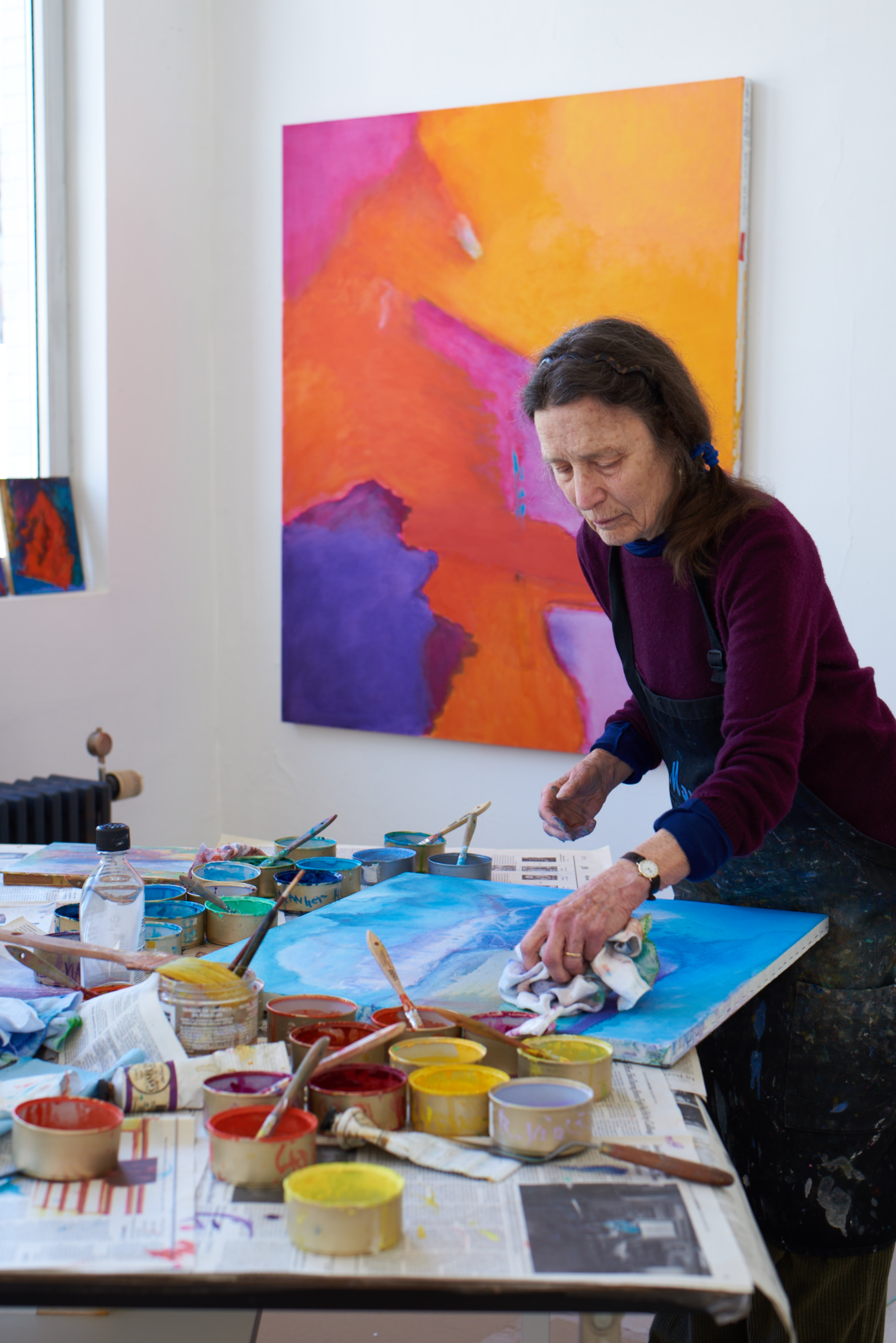
- Mason working in her Manhattan Studio in front of her painting Up River, 2016.
- Born: January 12, 1932; Greenwich Village, New York City, US
- Died: December 10, 2019 (aged 87); Brattleboro, Vermont, US
- Education: High School of Music & Art; Bennington College; Cooper Union for the Advancement of Science and Art
- Known for: Abstract painting
- Movement: Abstract Expressionism, Color Field painting, Lyrical Abstraction
- Spouse(s): Wolf Kahn, m. 1957

Emily Mason (January 12, 1932 – December 10, 2019) was an American abstract painter and printmaker. Mason developed her individual approach to the Abstract Expressionist and color field painting traditions with her veils of color and spontaneous gestural mark. Mason was born and raised in New York City, where she lived and worked until her death.

== Early life ==
Emily Mason was born in Greenwich Village, New York City, in 1932 to Alice Trumbull Mason and Warwood Edwin Mason. Her mother was a founder of the American Abstract Artists. Her father was sea captain for American Export Lines. She attended the High School of Music & Art from 1946 to 1950, then she attended Bennington College from 1950 to 1952. In 1952, Mason transferred from Bennington College to the Cooper Union for the Advancement of Science and Art, where she was graduated in 1955.

In 1956, Mason was awarded a Fulbright grant to study in Italy. Before moving there, she met fellow painter Wolf Kahn, who later joined her in Venice. They married on March 2, 1957, at the municipal building near the Rialto Bridge, witnessed by strangers and friends including filmmaker Tinto Brass. Her work earned her a second year of the Fulbright grant, which they spent between Venice and Rome, visiting other artists including Gretna Campbell, Louis Finkelstein, and Lee Bontecou.

In late 1958, the couple returned to New York, where Mason gave birth to their first daughter Cecily in 1959. In 1963, the family returned to Italy. Their daughter Melany was born in Rome in 1964. In 1968, the couple bought a farm in Brattleboro, Vermont, where Mason would spend her summers painting. In an interview with magazine Western Art & Architecture, Mason explained: "It is important to balance city life with experiencing nature. Winter in the city is the time for the fermentation of ideas. Summer is my time to carry them out."

== Career ==
Mason's career began to flourish in the 1960s. She was awarded her first solo exhibition in 1960 at the Area Gallery in New York City.

In 1979, she was invited by artist Sanford Wurmfeld to teach painting at Hunter College, where she worked for the next three decades.

In The Brooklyn Rail, publisher Phong Bui describes Mason's position between abstract expressionism and color field painting, noting: "She was interested in neither the former's existential angst nor the latter's use of absorbed color pigments on raw canvas (she paints on primed canvases). By allowing painterly gestures to coexist with thin, poured layers in a wide range of colors in all manner of hues and saturations, Mason is able to amplify her colors—which are infused with forms that derive from both memory and free association with concrete surroundings in nature—while embracing their complex tonalities."

In 2023, Mason's work saw a revival culminating in a retrospective show of the earlier works in her long career with an exhibition titled “The Thunder Hurried Slow: Emily Mason Paintings, 1968–1979” at Miles McEnery Gallery in New York .

== Collections ==
- Bennington Museum, Bennington, VT
- National Academy Museum, New York, NY
- New Britain Museum of American Art, New Britain, CT
- Springfield Museum, Springfield, MA
- University of New Mexico Art Museum, Albuquerque, NM
- Washington County Museum of Art, Hagerstown, MD
- Wheaton College, Norton, MA
