= Zogbaum =

Zogbaum is a surname. Notable people with the surname include:

- Rufus Fairchild Zogbaum (1849–1925), American illustrator, journalist, and writer
- Wilfrid Zogbaum (1915–1965), American painter and sculptor
