= Green River Cemetery =

In Springs, NY, US

Coordinates: 41.011463°N 72.14968°W

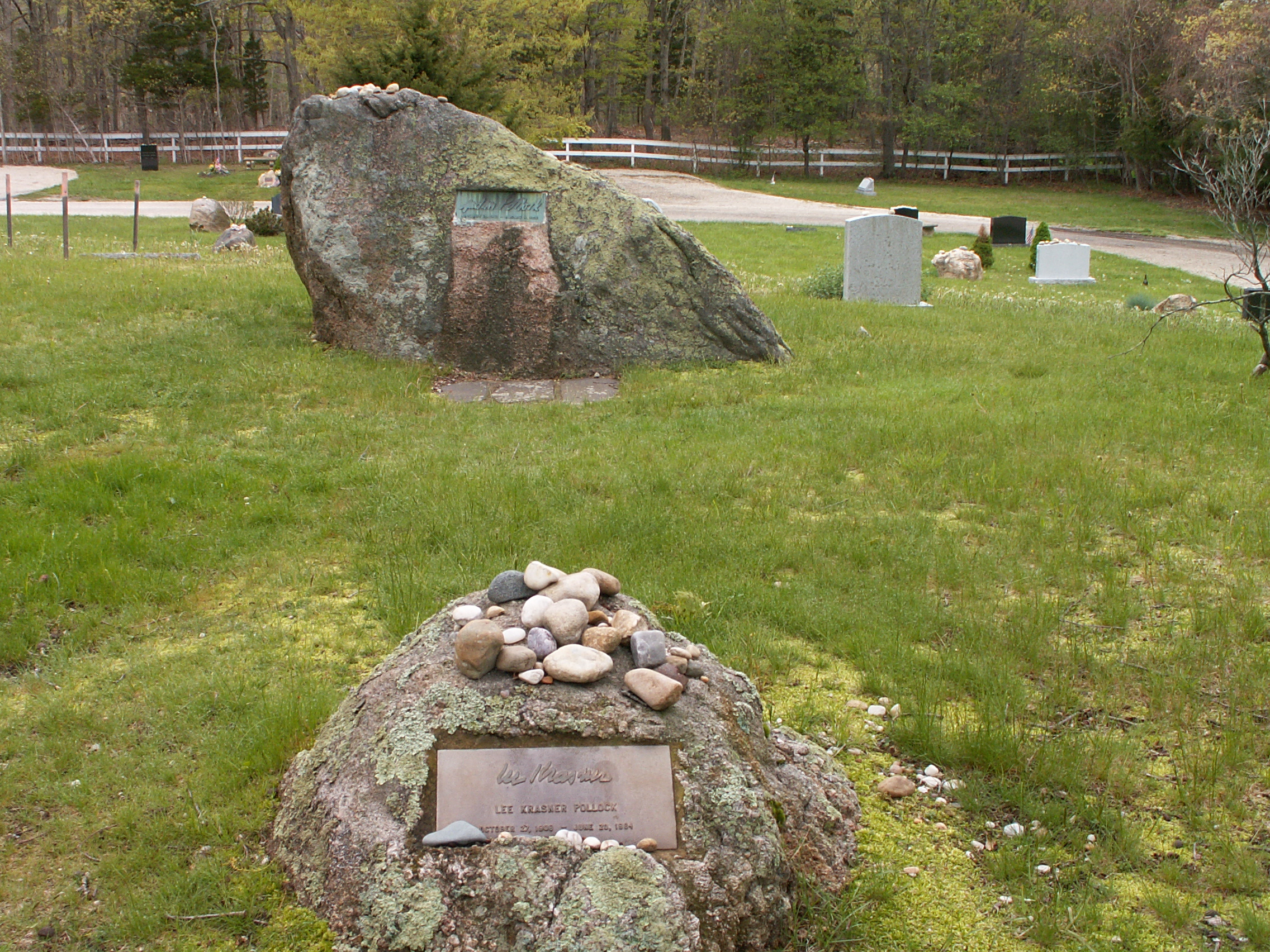
Jackson Pollock has a large headstone, while his wife Lee Krasner has the smaller stone at Green River Cemetery

Green River Cemetery is a cemetery in the hamlet of Springs, New York, within the Town of East Hampton.

The cemetery was originally intended for the blue collar local families (called Bonackers) of the Springs neighborhood who supported the ocean mansions in East Hampton (village), New York. Families with long histories in the region are interred there, including the Millers, Kings, Bennetts, and Talmages.

However, after Jackson Pollock was buried on a hill there in 1956, it became famous as the artists' and writers' cemetery. Headstones have become works of art.

Despite its name, there are no rivers near the cemetery.

== Notable burials ==
- Vernon Berg, III (1951-1999) – artist and gay activist
- Peter Boyle (1935–2006) – actor
- James Brooks (painter) (1906–1992) – abstract painter
- Dan Christensen (1942–2007) – artist
- Fred Coe (1914–1979) – television producer of The Philco Television Playhouse
- Stuart Davis (painter) (1892[94?]–1964) – cubist artist
- Elaine de Kooning (1918–1989) – artist and wife of abstract expressionist Willem de Kooning, who is not buried there
- Jimmy Ernst (1920–1984) – artist and son of Max Ernst
- Pierre Franey (1921–1996) – chef and newspaper columnist
- John Ferren (1905–1970) – abstract artist and painter
- Rae Ferren (1929–2016) – impressionist artist and painter
- Perle Fine (1905–1988) – artist
- Henry Geldzahler (1935–1994) – art historian, critic, museum curator and NYC Commissioner of Cultural Affairs
- Charles Gwathmey (1938–2009) – architect
- J.B. Handelsman (1922–2007) – cartoonist
- Lee Krasner (1908–1984) – artist and wife of Jackson Pollock
- Ibram Lassaw (1913–2003) – abstract sculptor
- William S. Lieberman (1923–2005) – Museum of Modern Art curator
- A.J. Liebling (1904–1963) – newspaper columnist
- Alan Manson (1919–2002) – actor
- Gary McFarland (1933–1971) – musician, composer, leader, music producer
- Kyle R. Morris (1818–1979) – artist
- Hilda Morley (1916–1998) – poet
- Frank O'Hara (1926–1966) – poet
- John Opper (1908–1994) – abstract painter
- Alfonso A. Ossorio (1916–1990) – artist (half his ashes are here)
- Alan J. Pakula (1928–1998) – film producer of To Kill a Mockingbird, film director of Klute and All the President's Men
- Philip Pavia (1911–2005) – artist
- Jackson Pollock (1912–1956) – abstract expressionist painter and husband of Lee Krasner
- Abraham Rattner (1895–1978) – painter
- Ad Reinhardt (1913–1967) – abstract painter
- Harold Rosenberg (1906–1978) – art critic
- Steven J. Ross (1927–1992) – CEO who engineered the merger of Time-Warner
- Jean Stafford (1915–1979) – Pulitzer Prize–winning writer
- Ted Stamm (1944–1984) – American minimalist and conceptual artist
- William Steinberg (1899-1978) German-American Orchestra conductor
- Stan Vanderbeek (1927–1983) – underground film maker
- Hannah Wilke (1940–1993) – painter, sculptor and photographer
- Stefan Wolpe (1902–1972) – composer
- Jan Yoors (1922–1977) – artist and writer
