= Arthur N. Christie =

American artist

- Born: 1891; Jersey City, New Jersey
- Died: 1980 (aged 88–89); New York, New York
- Known for: Painting
- Movement: Abstract Expressionism

Arthur N. Christie also known as A. N. Christie (1891-1980) was an American painter and founding member of the American Abstract Artists.

== Biography ==
Christie was born in 1891 in Jersey City, New Jersey. He studied at the Pratt Institute, and the American Artists School. He was a cofounder of the American Abstract Artists in 1936. He died in 1980

Christie's work is included in the collections of the Museum of Modern Art, the National Gallery of Art, the Smithsonian American Art Museum, and the Whitney Museum of American Art. His papers are in the Archives of American Art at Smithsonian Institution.
