= Frederick Kann =

American artist (1886–1965)

- Born: May 25, 1884; Gablonz, Czechoslovakia
- Died: July 6, 1965 (aged 79); Los Angeles, California
- Known for: Painting, Educator
- Movement: Abstract Expressionism

Frederick Kann (1886–1965) was an American painter and founding member of the American Abstract Artists.

== Biography ==
Kann was born on May 25, 1884, in Gablonz, Bohemia (then in the Austro-Hungarian Empire). He studied at the Czech Technical University in Prague, the Academy of Fine Arts, Prague and the Academy of Fine Arts, Munich. In 1910 he immigrated to the United States, working for the next eighteen years as a commercial artist in New York. He became a naturalized U.S. citizen the same year. He then moved to Paris, returning to the United States in 1936 to begin his teaching career at the Kansas City Art Institute.

He was a cofounder of the American Abstract Artists in 1936. In 1939, his work was included in the Galerie Charpentier's exhibition Realites Nouvelles Renaissance Plastique.

In 1943, Kann moved to Los Angeles. There he worked to promote Abstract artists' work by establishing the Circle Gallery, and co-found the Modern Institute of Art. In 1953 he started the Kann Institute of Art.

He died on July 6, 1965, in Los Angeles, California.
