= Agnes Lyall =

American artist (1908–2013)

Agnes Earl Lyall (February 25, 1908 - September 14, 2013) was an American artist. She helped found the American Abstract Artists in 1936. Her work is included in the collections of the Whitney Museum of American Art, the Metropolitan Museum of Art, the Smithsonian American Art Museum, the Brooklyn Museum, the Yale University Art Gallery, the Carnegie Museum of Art, the National Gallery of Art and the Museum of Modern Art, New York. She was also exhibited at the Riverside Museum.

During World War II, the Office of Strategic Services (OSS) selected her to receive training in Japanese at Columbia University. She became an American Council of Learned Societies Grantee/Fellow in the Intensive Language Program in 1942, decoding Japanese messages intercepted from enemy ship communications.

Lyall died at her home in Lake Hill, New York at the age of 105.

== Education ==
Lyall graduated with a BA in Art from Smith College in 1930, and MA in Art from Columbia University. She spent some time in Europe traveling and studying art and returned to New York City.
