= Wilfrid Zogbaum =

American sculptor

Wilfrid "Zog" Zogbaum (1915 – January 7, 1965) was an American painter, sculptor, and educator. He was also a commercial photographer in the late 1940s, and started a sculpture studio in Montauk.

== Life ==
Wilfrid Zogbaum was born in 1915 in Newport, Rhode Island. Zogbaum's father was Admiral Rufus F. Zogbaum, Jr., and his grandfather was painter Rufus Fairchild Zogbaum.

He studied art at the Rhode Island School of Design for two summers. Followed by study at Yale School of Fine Arts (now Yale School of Art), under John Sloan, and Hans Hoffman. Giorgio Cavallon and George McNeil were the class aids in Hoffman's class. He was a founding member of American Abstract Artists in 1937. In 1937, Zogbaum was awarded a Guggenheim Fellowship to studied in Europe. While in Europe he met Ben Nicholson, Naum Gabo and László Moholy-Nagy, Fernand Léger and Wassily Kandinsky.

He served as a photographer in the U.S. Army Signal Corps during World War II. He was an associate professor at University of California, Berkeley (U.C. Berkeley) in 1957 and 1961–1962.

Zogbaum's work has been exhibited in a number of galleries, including the Anita Shapolsky Gallery in New York City, Manny Silverman Gallery in Los Angeles, and Michael Rosenfeld Gallery in New York City. His papers are held at the Archives of American Art.
