= Hananiah Harari =

American painter

- Born: Richard Falk Goldman; August 29, 1912; Rochester, New York
- Died: July 19, 2000 (aged 87); Hawthorne, New York
- Education: Syracuse University
- Known for: Painting

Hananiah Harari (August 29, 1912 – July 19, 2000) was an American painter and illustrator.

== Life ==
Harari was born Richard (Dick) Falk Goldman, in Rochester, New York. He studied at the Syracuse University School of Fine Arts. He went to Paris in the 1930s, where he studied with Fernand Léger from 1932 to 1934; he also studied with Marcel Gromaire and André Lhote. Following a visit to Palestine, he returned to the United States in 1935.

He helped found the American Abstract Artists in 1937. Some of his works of this period record his reaction as a Jew to the rise of Fascism in Europe; an example is The Dictators (1938, oil and collage on canvas; now in the Jewish Museum, New York). His first New York exhibition was in 1939, at Mercury Gallery. He worked in both a semi-abstract style, and a precise realist style; inspired by the work of William Michael Harnett, he painted many trompe-l'œil still lifes. Several silkscreens from this period are in the Metropolitan Museum of Art and in the Yale University Collection.

In the 1940s he produced artwork for the covers of magazines, including Fortune. He also contributed cartoons to The New Masses, which led to his being blacklisted in the 1950s during the McCarthy era. Using his gifts for Realism, he became a successful portrait painter affiliated with Portraits, Inc. One of his portraits is in the National Portrait Gallery in Washington D.C. Harari taught at the School of Visual Arts in Manhattan from 1974 to 1990, and at the Art Students League from 1984 to 1999, where most of his classes were filled to capacity. He stopped teaching when he could no longer see. With the Reagan presidency, his political leanings became increasingly conservative. A patriot to the end, and per his request, his coffin was draped with the American flag. He was elected into the National Academy of Design in 1990 as an Associate member and became a full Academician in 1994.

In 1997 a traveling retrospective of his work was mounted at the Montclair Art Museum in New Jersey. He died in Hawthorne, New York in 2000.

Harari's work is included in the collections of the Metropolitan Museum of Art, the Museum of Modern Art, the National Gallery of Art, the Smithsonian American Art Museum, and the Whitney Museum of American Art.
