= Alice Mason (artist) =

American painter

Alice Trumbull Mason
- Mason in her studio, 1954
- Born: Alice Bradford Trumbull; 1904; Litchfield, Connecticut, US
- Died: 1971 (aged 66–67); New York City, US
- Known for: Painting Printmaking
- Movement: Architectural Abstraction, Biomorphic Abstraction, American Abstraction
- Children: Emily Mason

Alice Trumbull Mason (1904–1971) was an American artist, writer, and a founding member of the American Abstract Artists group (AAA) in New York City. Mason was recognized as a pioneer of American Abstract Art.

== Early life ==
Mason was born Alice Bradford Trumbull in Litchfield, Connecticut in 1904, descended from 18th-Century Revolutionary War painter John Trumbull through her father. She travelled throughout Europe when she was young. Beginning in 1921, she studied art in Rome, attending the British Academy in 1923.

She settled in New York by 1927 and was influenced by early abstract artist Arshile Gorky. She also studied with Charles Webster Hawthorne at the National Academy of Design in New York where she befriended artists Esphyr Slobodkina and Ilya Bolotowsky. While her earlier works were biomorphic or pure abstraction, her knowledge of Byzantine architecture later infused her compositions with an architectural dimension. She continued her studies at the Grand Central Art Galleries until 1931. She later wrote that she became devoted to abstraction in 1929, "[A]fter happily painting these realistic things, I said to myself, 'What do I really know?' I knew the shape of my canvas and the use of my colors and I was completely joyful not to be governed by representing things anymore."

== Career and later life ==
Mason married Warwood Mason, a sea captain, in 1930. They had two children; a son, Jonathan "Jo" Mason (1933-1958), and a daughter Emily Mason (1932–2019), who also became an abstract painter.

Alice Trumbull Mason took up poetry and corresponded with Gertrude Stein before resuming her painting in 1934. She helped found the American Abstract Artists in 1936, serving as treasurer, secretary, and then president. She took part in a MoMA demonstration. In the 1940s she began working at the Atelier 17 where she created etchings and woodcuts.

Mason's first solo exhibition of her work in New York was in 1942 at The Museum of Living Art. Mason exhibited widely over the next few decades in group exhibitions. Many subsequent solo-exhibitions would follow, including Rose Fried Gallery (Pinacotheca) in 1949 and 1951, and Firehouse Gallery, Nassau Community College in 1957.

After the death of her son in 1958, Mason struggled with depression and alcoholism. During one stay at a rehabilitation clinic, she met and befriended Richard ("Dick") Bellamy, who would later exhibit her at Hansa Gallery in 1959. Mason painted her last work in 1969.

== Death and legacy ==
From insufficient recognition in her lifetime, often reserved for her male contemporaries, Mason would say, "I'll be famous when I'm dead." Mason remained quite active until her last years of life, exhibiting frequently in gallery shows and having institutions, like the Whitney and Brooklyn Museum, acquire her work.

In 1958, the body of Mason's son Jo was found in Puget Sound in Washington, after he had been missing for five months. After the death of her son, Mason struggled with depression and alcoholism. After multiple attempts at rehabilitation, she died in New York City in 1971.

Two years after her death, the Whitney Museum of American Art hosted a retrospective exhibition of her works. Her work is included in many museum and public collections, including the Hirshhorn Museum, the Newark Museum, the Metropolitan Museum of Art, the Museum of Modern Art, and the Rhode Island School of Design Museum.

The Emily Mason and Alice Trumbull Mason Foundation was established in 2019, stewarding the legacies of Mason and her daughter, Emily. In May 2020, Rizzoli published the first comprehensive introduction to Mason's remarkable life and career, "Alice Trumbull Mason: A Pioneer of Abstraction." This monograph details Mason's artistic process, painting style, activism, printmaking, poetry, and letters.

== Artistic style ==
Mason's intimate and experimental abstractions began in a biomorphic style and became increasingly geometric over time. She called what became her signature style "architectural abstraction," which she said was about "painting a positive, architectural construction […] It is building and not destroying." As New York Times critic Holland Cotter observed, Mason's paintings show how "rigorous, stimulating, and accessible" abstraction can be.

In 2020, Roberta Smith of The New York Times wrote of Mason's trajectory, "The forms on her small canvases mutated with unusual variety and momentum between the biomorphic and geometric (the latter ultimately won out). In other words, the initial influence of Kandinsky (and also Joan Miró) gave way to that of Piet Mondrian, on whose legacy she built with an originality that few other American painters have equaled."
