= American Abstract Artists =

Artist association

- Abbreviation: AAA
- Formation: January 29, 1937; 89 years ago
- Type: Arts organization
- Tax ID no.: 84-4920801 (EIN)
- Purpose: Exhibition of abstract art
- Headquarters: New York City, United States
- Region served: United States
- Official language: English
- Website: americanabstractartists.org

American Abstract Artists (AAA) was founded in 1937 in New York City, to promote and foster public understanding of abstract art. American Abstract Artists exhibitions, publications, and lectures helped to establish the organization as a major forum for the exchange and discussion of ideas, and for presenting abstract art to a broader public. The American Abstract Artists group contributed to the development and acceptance of abstract art in the United States and has a historic role in its avant-garde. It is one of the few artists' organizations to survive from the Great Depression and continue into the 21st century.

== History ==
=== Founding and early activities ===
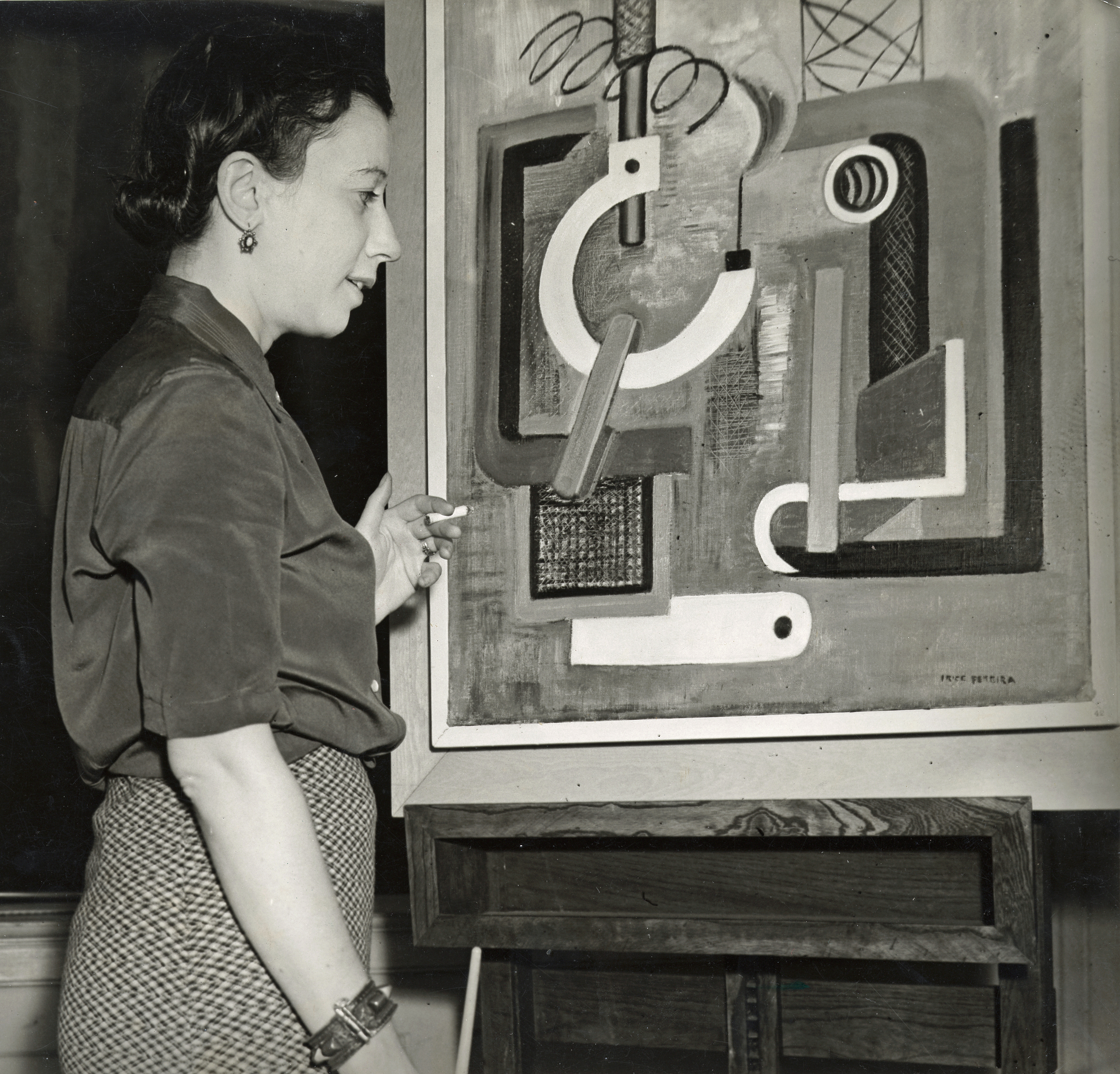
Irene Rice Pereira with a painting, 1938. I. Rice Pereira was an early member of American Abstract Artists.

In the 1930s a group of American painters founded The American Abstract Artists (AAA) with the aim of developing a new approach to painting characterized by shapes and primary colors. Within the initial circle of the AAA was also a small cohort of wealthy abstract artists from New York, known as the Park Avenue Cubists, who combined Constructivist and Cubist principles into their paintings. During the 1930s, abstract art was viewed with critical opposition and there was little support from art galleries and museums. The American Abstract Artists group was established as a forum for discussion and debate of abstract art and to provide exhibition opportunities when few other possibilities existed. In late 1935 and early 1936 a small group of artists, who would become founding members of AAA, had sporadic informal meetings in their studios about exhibiting abstract art. This culminated in November 1936 at a larger meeting in Harry Holtzman's loft where he was seeking support for an abstract artist cooperative and workshop but the idea was not accepted among the attendees. However Holtzman's organization of the November meeting was crucial in bringing together many of the painters and sculptors who would establish AAA the following year. On January 15, 1937 the artists met and decided they would create a group named American Abstract Artists. The American Abstract Artists General Prospectus was issued in January 29, 1937 founding the organization. It outlined the purpose of AAA and the importance of exhibitions in promoting the growth and acceptance of abstract art in the United States.

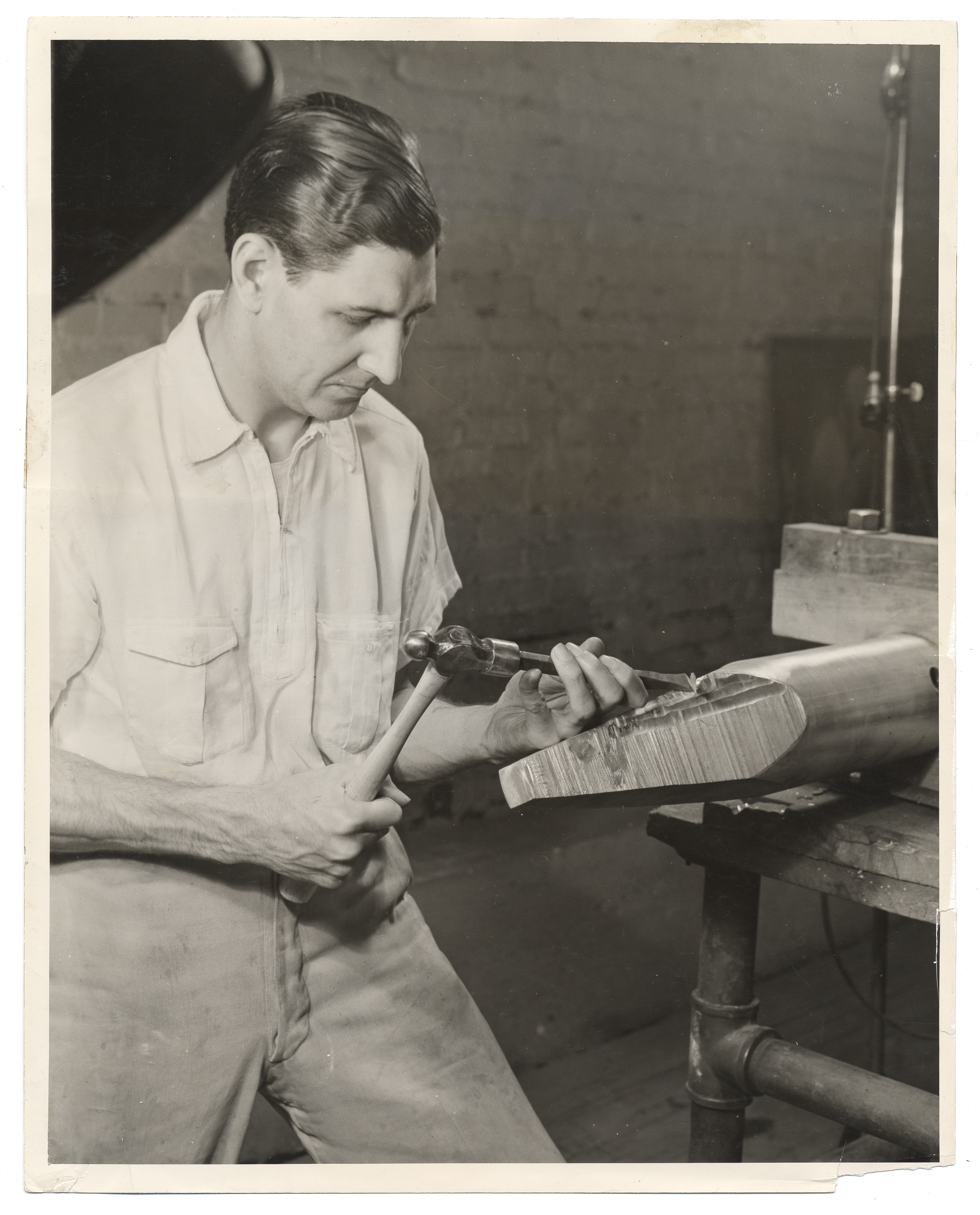
José Ruiz de Rivera, 1937. The sculptor was an early American Abstract Artists member.

Under the heading General Purpose, the American Abstract Artists General Prospectus (1937) says "Our purpose is to unite American 'abstract' artists, (1) to bring before the public their individual works, (2) to foster public appreciation of this direction and painting and sculpture, (3) to afford each artist the opportunity of developing his own work by becoming familiar with the efforts of others, by recognizing differences as well as those elements he may have in common with them." The prospectus also proposes "that the most direct approach to our objective is the exhibition of our work." The American artists that embraced abstraction in the face of prevailing styles of realism and who banded together in New York to form AAA in 1937, sought to educate the American public about abstract art, promote solidarity among abstract artists, and explore new exhibition possibilities.

American Abstract Artists General Prospectus grouped members into two tiers: Membership and Associate Membership. Associate Members did not exhibit but were sympathetic to the organizations goals. As an example of how the membership process worked, Charmion von Wiegand became an associate member of the American Abstract Artists in 1941 at AAA Founder Carl Holty's recommendation, then a full member in 1947, began exhibiting with AAA in 1948, and was its president from 1951 to 1953. The prospectus did not place limitations upon its members showing with other groups. Other 1930s Depression Era artist run organizations included AAA members: Sculptors Guild (Louise Bourgeois, Ibram Lassaw, José Ruiz de Rivera, Louis Schanker, Wilfrid Zogbaum), The Ten also known as The Ten Whitney Dissenters (Ilya Bolotowsky, Louis Schanker, Karl Knaths, Ralph Rosenberg), Artists Union (Byron Browne, Balcomb Greene, Gertrude Greene, Ibram Lassaw, Michael Loew) and American Artists' Congress (Ilya Bolotowsky, Byron Browne, Werner Drewes, Carl Holty, Irene Rice Pereira).

AAA held its inaugural exhibition in 1937 at the Squibb Gallery in New York City. This was the most extensive and widely attended exhibition of American abstract painting outside of a museum during the 1930s. Two years earlier the Whitney Museum of American Art held an exhibit, "Abstract Painting in America," from February 12 - March 22, 1935, with 65 abstract artists working in the United States including future AAA founders and members Byron Browne, Werner Drewes, Balcomb Greene, Karl Knaths, Irene Rice Pereira, and Louis Schanker. The majority of AAA worked in either a Cubist inspired idiom, a geometric style with biomorphic forms or Neoplasticism, and the group officially rejected Expressionism and Surrealism. Ibram Lassaw was the only sculptor to be represented in the first AAA exhibit. For the 1937 exhibition AAA produced its first print portfolio of original zinc plate lithographs, instead of documenting the exhibit with a catalog. George L. K. Morris, an exhibitor and founding member of the AAA, purchased 10 pieces from the show. Morris had established the Gallery of Living Art in 1927, a public collection of modern art in New York City. Future exhibitions and publications would establish AAA as a major forum for the discussion and presentation of new abstract and non-objective art. Over the next few years Morris and his wife Suzy Frelinghuysen, who joined AAA, collected artwork by 25 members of the American Abstract Artists group.

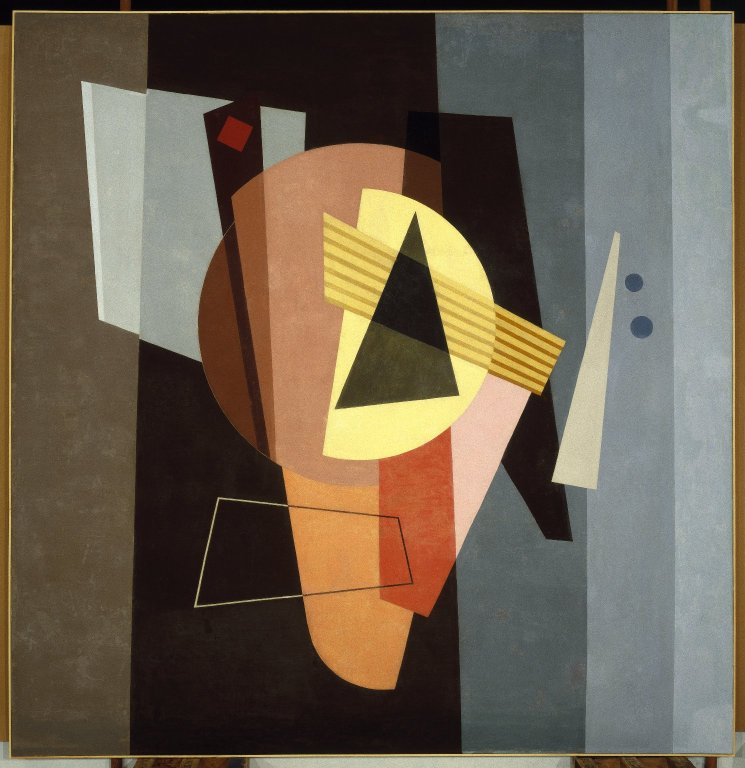
Paul Kelpe, Untitled, From the Williamsburg Housing Project Murals, 1938. Brooklyn Museum (L1990.1.3). Paul Kelpe was a founding member of American Abstract Artists.

=== Communism and political tensions in AAA ===
There was extensive hostile criticism of AAA exhibits in New York City newspapers and art magazines of the time. The most influential critics dismissed American abstract art as too European and therefore "un-American", a term that meant suspected of having communist ties. The Communist Party in the United States and USSR viewed art as a weapon in class struggle and fascism. Radicalization of the unemployed American artist became a major factor in the life of New Deal artists, especially in New York City. Radical artists had been joining the Communist Party for years and forming their own organizations. In the 1930s American Abstract Artists was divided on political grounds with disagreements among Communist Party members who demanded AAA advocate political positions. Some artists who joined AAA were interested in Trotskyism, and there was turbulence between the group's Trotskyist and Stalinist members. Lee Krasner's beliefs as a Trotskyite landed her in jail where she met AAA founding member Mercedes Carles Matter, through her Lee Krasner joined the AAA. AAA founders Balcomb and Gertrude Greene were heavily involved in political activism to promote mainstream acceptance of abstract art within the anti-Stalinist left. Communists opposed fascism, believed in the idea that art was a weapon in the war against it and "abstract art was seen as a threat to the rise of fascism and Nazism in Europe." American Abstract Artists declared for its annual in March 1942 that it is a "privilege and necessity" to make and exhibit abstract art as an affront to fascism. The National Socialists forced Bauhaus teachers, including Josef Albers and László Moholy-Nagy, to expatriate from Germany and immigrate to the United States where they continued teaching and influenced a group of artists in New York City who formed the American Abstract Artists, which Albers and Moholy-Nagy joined.

Artist run organizations like the Artists Union and American Artists' Congress, which included AAA members, were involved with the Communist Party USA. Art Front was a magazine published by the Artists Union in New York. The first two Artists Union presidents would become American Abstract Artists founders and future AAA founding and early members were Editors-in-Chief and on the Business Staff of Art Front. Art Front had a proletariat political viewpoint where the artist was a worker "like a machinist, bricklayer or cobbler in the industrial sphere." "National Organization" was permanent feature of the magazine for "organizing artists groups on an economic basis" as a labor movement. The argument of class struggle was that the government should eliminate the dependence of American artists (the worker or proletariat) from the caprice of private patronage (the bourgeoisie). In an Art Front review of AAA's first exhibit Jacob Kainen wrote that dictates of the market conspired against abstract artists in the United States and it is natural they band together in mutual defense. Artists organized as cultural workers used militant trade union tactics like picketing and confrontations with the police which contributed to their solidarity. On December 1, 1936 the Artists Union held a sit-in turned riot at the Federal Art Project offices where the police arrested 219 artists protesting WPA layoffs. American Abstract Artists would do the same issuing its own publications in protest and demonstrate as well. Lee Krasner as a board member of the Artists Union worked with American Abstract Artists to fight for fair pay of artists' work.

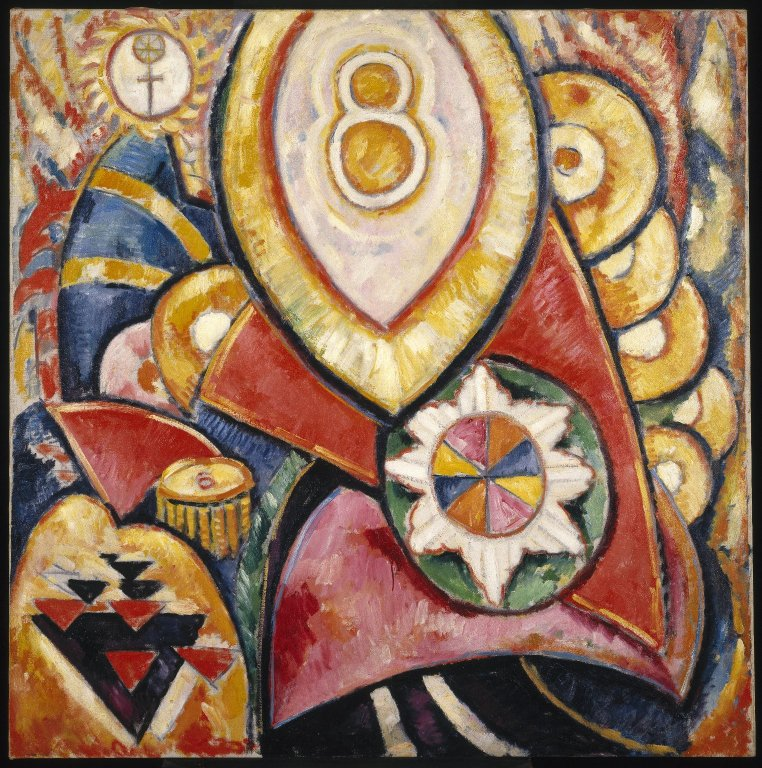
Marsden Hartley (American, 1877–1943). Painting No. 48, 1913. Brooklyn Museum

=== Critical reception and institutional opposition ===
American abstract art was struggling to win acceptance and AAA personified this. The 1938 Yearbook addressed criticisms levied against abstract art by the press and public. It also featured essays related to principles behind and the practice of making abstract art. In 1940, AAA printed a broadside titled "How Modern is the Museum of Modern Art?" which was handed out at their protest of the Italian Masters exhibit in front of MoMA. AAA questioned MoMA's stated commitment to modern and contemporary art when it was actually exhibiting Italian Renaissance artwork. At the time the Museum of Modern Art also had a policy of featuring European abstraction while endorsing American regionalism and scene painting. This policy helped entrench the notion that abstraction was foreign to the American experience. Esphyr Slobodkina, a founding member and future president of the American Abstract Artists Group, described the Museum of Modern Art as a shameful display of "snobbish discrimination" that preferred to exhibit "gilt-edged, 100% secure, thoroughly documented and world renowned exponents of foreign abstract art." However, out of the fifty-two AAA members listed on the broadside distributed at the MoMA protest, eighteen had exhibited at the Museum of Modern Art including George L.K. Morris who had been a member of the museum's board of advisors.

In 1940 AAA also produced a 12-page pamphlet: "The Art Critics – ! How Do They Serve the Public? What Do They Say? How Much Do They Know? Let's Look at the Record." The AAA publication quoted critics, highlighting misstatements and contradictions in the press. The pamphlet excoriated notable New York Herald Tribune critic Royal Cortissoz for his rigid loyalty to traditionalism, his patent distaste for abstract and modern art, and generally for what the pamphlet regarded as his "resistance to knowledge". It also characterized the aesthetic vacillations of Thomas Craven, critic of the New York American, as opportunistic. In 1936, Craven labeled Picasso's work "Bohemian infantilism". The ensuing years would see a growing public appreciation for abstract art until, in 1939, the critic made an about-face and lauded Picasso for his "unrivaled inventiveness". The pamphlet applauded Henry McBride of the New York Sun and Robert Coates of The New Yorker for their critical efforts regarding abstract art. "The Art Critics" showed the lack of knowledge the critics from New York City newspapers and art publications had about developments in 20th-century art. Controversy persisted and in a 1979 New York Times exhibition review Hilton Kramer asserted that "The truth is, a group like the American Abstract Artists no longer has any serious function to perform, and its continued existence is little more than an act of nostalgia... Surely it is time to disband."

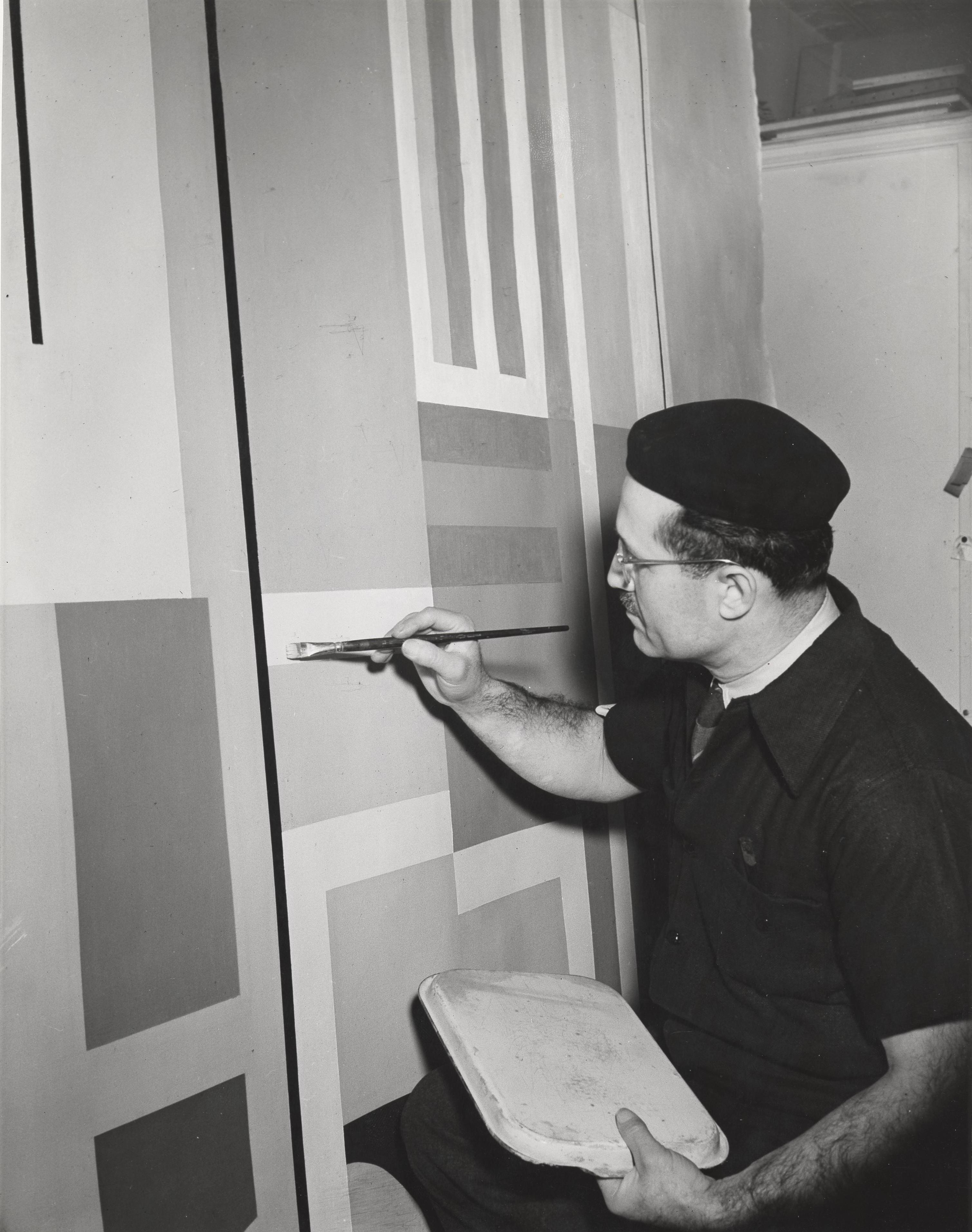
Jean Xceron painting, 1942. Jean Xceron was an early member of American Abstract Artists.

The picketing, broadside and brochure in 1940 were a game of positioning the organization in opposition to an art institution and established critics as part of a self-conscious process to legitimizing an avant-garde. AAA combated prevailing hostile attitudes toward abstraction and prepared the way for its acceptance after World War II. AAA was a precursor to abstract expressionism by helping abstract art discover its identity in the United States. However American Abstract Artists included many but did not represent all early American artists working abstractly such as those in Stieglitz Group like Arthur Dove, Marsden Hartley and John Marin. Marin was credited with influencing Abstract Expressionists. San Francisco Bay Area Abstract Expressionists were also not in AAA like Clyfford Still, Jay DeFeo and Frank Lobdell. In the 1940s Clyfford Still was teaching at California School of Fine Arts, later renamed San Francisco Art Institute. He had his first museum show at the San Francisco Museum of Fine Arts in 1943.

During the 1920s and 1930s many European artist immigrants settled in New York and joined AAA: Josef Albers, Ilya Bolotowsky, Giorgio Cavallon, Fritz Glarner, Ibram Lassaw, Fernand Léger, László Moholy-Nagy, and Piet Mondrian and Hans Richter. Jean Xceron was in the inner circle of Abstraction-Création, moved to New York City in 1937 and joined American Abstract Artists who welcomed him as a leading Parisian artist. This created a paradox for the group, AAA secured prestige by increasing the group's international character with its European expatriate modern masters but was then seen as not "American" enough to represent the United States. The exhibitions, organization and its strict geometrical style no longer functioned as an avant-garde influence in New York City. During the early 1940s the New York School gained momentum and throughout the mid-1940s and 1950s Abstract Expressionism dominated the American avant-garde. The AAA was influential for a few years, from 1937 to 1940, setting the trend at the moment before the center of the art world shifted from Paris to New York after World War II. Though some members of American Abstract Artists rose to fame and international recognition in the following decades, the membership represented the interwar generation with all the doubts and inner turmoil of that time. As an egalitarian artist run organization, AAA was serious about its professional goal of gaining acceptance of abstraction but applied minimal standards in selecting applicants based on the quality of their work for membership. Founding member Alice Trumbull Mason wrote in a letter to the AAA membership dated May 23, 1944: "it has become apparent that, as public interest in abstract art has increased the members have shown less and less interest in furthering the aims for which the group was founded. This year indeed many, as far as the group is concerned, have ceased to function entirely." Carl Holty recommended the group disband as AAA had served its purpose which was to show abstract artists who were not being shown. By the spring of 1947 only 14 out of 39 founding members remained to take part in the AAA 11th annual exhibit at the Riverside Museum. In the fall of 1949 The Club became the major forum for discussion of the avant-garde and abstraction in New York City, which included some of the AAA members. American Abstract Artists continued its mandate as an advocate for abstract art.

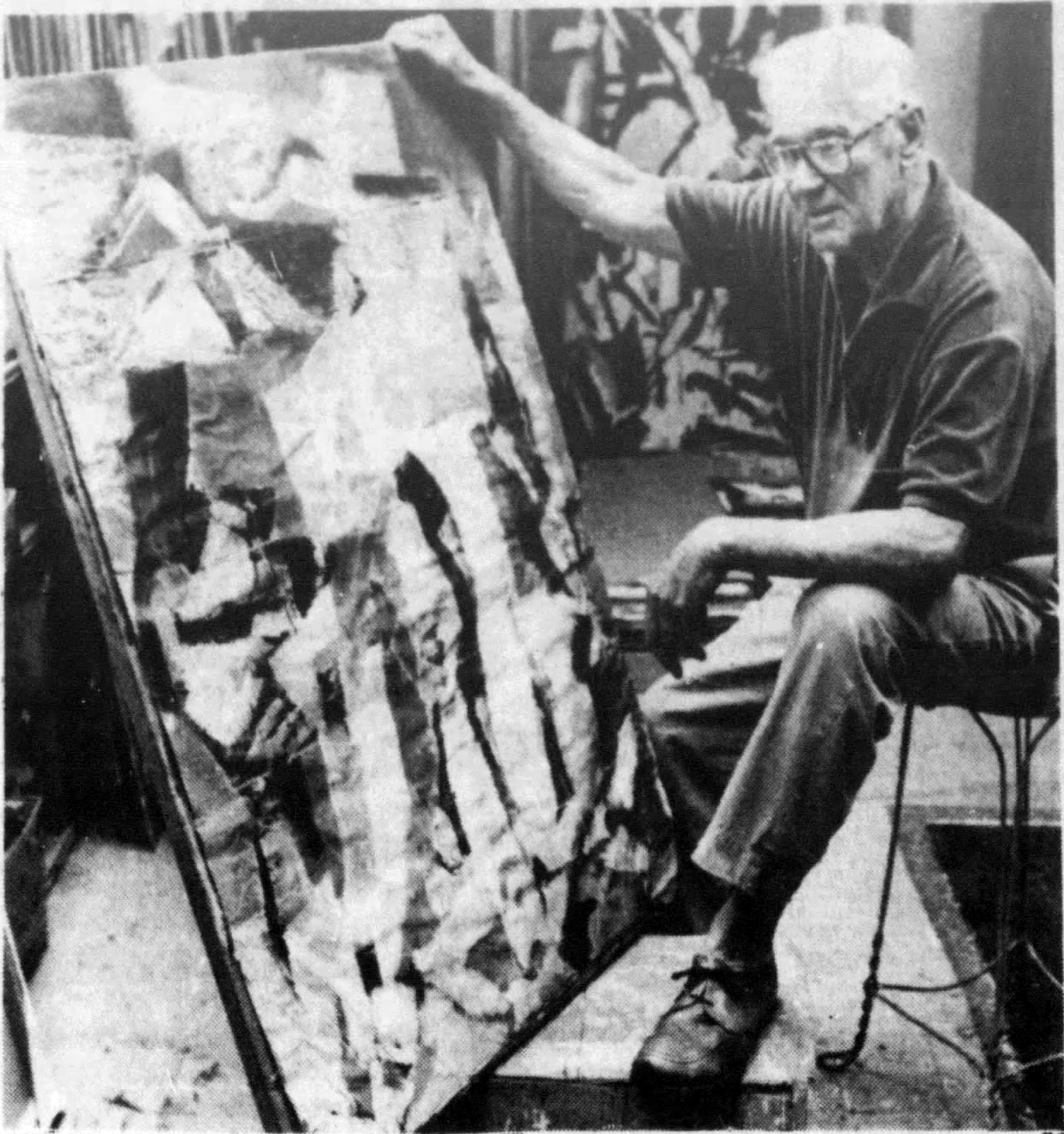
Vaclav Vytlacil in 1979. He was a founding member of AAA.

Women have had been active and essential to the history of AAA. By working in abstraction, female AAA members rejected the dominant realism of the time, which often reinforced subject matter identified as feminine or appropriate for women painters like scenes of mothers and children. The organization was notably inclusive of women, treating them as equals at a time when women were rarely afforded such status elsewhere. Female members served as officers and on committees, wrote for publications, and organized programs. Founding member Gertrude Greene organized the group's first exhibition at Squibb Gallery in 1937. Esphyr Slobodkina, also a founder, was the organization's first secretary, later president and treasurer. Of AAA's 15 presidents, 6 have been women. The group's membership has been a nearly equal divide between men and women. Both male and female members shared a common goal, advocating for abstract art.

American Abstract Artists was one of a number of Great Depression Era artist run organizations in the United States, others included Artists Union, American Artists' Congress, American Artists School, John Reed Club, The Ten, Federation of Modern Painters and Sculptors, Harlem Artists Guild, Sculptors Guild, Artists' Committee of Action and Unemployed Artists Group. Early members included Josef Albers, Willem de Kooning, Lee Krasner, Jackson Pollock, David Smith, John Ferren, I. Rice Pereira, Ad Reinhardt and Clement Greenberg. Ferren, a California native, was one of the few AAA members to reach artistic maturity in Paris.

== American Abstract Artists today ==
American Abstract Artists still exists today despite never disbanding. The association was most active from 1936 to 1941. AAA was founded during a very political time but is no longer politically engaged and doesn't host annual membership exhibitions any more. American Abstract Artists was originally founded as an exhibition society to promote American abstract art, when abstraction was perceived as avant-garde. Ninety years later, abstraction is widely accepted as a legitimate art form, and is displayed in hotels and bank lobbies all over the United States. Today AAA is exclusively a membership organization focused on periodic exhibitions of their past history, some of which have been Blurring Boundaries: The Women Of AAA, 1936–present, a 2018-2023 traveling show; Trespassing: in honor of Werner Drewes and 80 years of American Abstract Artists, 2016 (Drewes a founding member); To Leo: A Tribute from American Abstract Artists, 2014 (50 year anniversary of Leo Rabkin as AAA President); and American Abstract Artists: Tribute to Esphyr Slobodkina, 2008 (a founding member); as well as member presentations and AAA website Member Profiles.

In a 2019 interview AAA affirmed that the key to its future is diversity, equity and inclusion in demographics, artistic disciplines and expanding with satellite chapters in other regions outside of New York City. Contemporary scholarship has argued that longstanding Native American abstract traditions were marginalized in dominant histories of American modernism, prompting broader reassessments of early American abstract art movements. In its early years, the American Abstract Artists embodied European diaspora, but today its historically fixed name does not reflect the Latin American, Muslim, and hemispheric diasporas shaping contemporary abstraction in the United States. Currently the group consists of an aging primarily white membership, and the necessity of attracting younger abstract artists and artists of color is important to the organization's survival. Traditionally, American Abstract Artists has always been a New York based group rarely opening its circle to artists beyond New York City.

To date the organization has produced over 75 exhibitions of its membership in museums and galleries across the United States. AAA has published 5 Journals, in addition to brochures, books, catalogs, and has hosted critical panels and symposia. AAA distributes its published materials internationally to cultural organizations. The most recent journal Past/Present: American Abstract Artists Members Honor Their Predecessors is a nostalgic look back where "current members were asked to write about a deceased member they admired or who had influenced them" examining their personal history. American Abstract Artists has produced print portfolios by its membership. AAA print portfolios are in the collections of the Whitney Museum of American Art, Museum of Modern Art, Tate in London, and the Archives of American Art.

== Founding members ==
Several different versions of the founding of American Abstract Artists exist. Each early member remembers a different story about the events preceding the founding of American Abstract Artists. In the beginning they weren't sure if they should be an informal discussion group concerned with the problems in their work, an exhibition society or a group focused on teaching. At one early meeting George McNeil was tasked with making a list of forty present and future members so the group could procure all four floors of the Municipal Art Gallery in New York City to exhibit. Failing to reach the required number of names he was authorized to use fictitious ones. Arshile Gorky attended early meetings and was instrumental in founding the AAA but never formally joined the organization.

The idea for the organization was conceived in 1934 when Katherine Sophie Dreier, who founded the Society of Independent Artists with Marcel Duchamp, Man Ray and others, contacted Burgoyne Diller about forming a group of abstract artists for an exhibition and to produce portfolio of their work. A group assembled and would become the American Abstract Artists with its first exhibit in 1937 accompanied by the AAA 1937 portfolio of lithographs.

"Exhibition of American Abstract Painting" also known as "Abstract Painting in America" opened at the Whitney Museum of American Art in February 12, 1935. The exhibition assessed the commitment of American artists to abstraction, and traced the development of abstract painting in the United States during the early 20th century. It was first major museum exhibit to explore the role of abstraction in American art and was a pivotal moment that brought about discussions on the validity of abstract art. Many artists felt marginalized compared to their figurative counterparts. The exhibition inspired a coalition of artists to meet at Ibram Lassaw's studio, including Burgoyne Diller, Gertrude Greene, Harry Holtzman, and Byron Browne. They exchanged views about exhibiting and the creation of a school for modern art. The idea for the school was abandoned, but the idea of an exhibition group took hold. They would form the American Abstract Artists group to continue the discussion started by the Whitney Museum and promote abstract art through exhibitions.

In 1935, four friends, Rosalind Bengelsdorf, Byron Browne, Albert Swinden, and Ibram Lassaw, met in Bengelsdorf's 230 Wooster Street studio to discuss organizing an exhibit of abstract artists they knew in New York City which would become the inaugural AAA exhibition at Squibb Galleries.

Rosalind Bengelsdorf's account lists 9 founders detailed as a "small group of abstract artists who met at Ibram Lassaw's studio at 232 Wooster Street, New York, early in 1936. The gathering consisted roughly of Byron Browne, Gertrude and Balcomb Greene, Harry Holtzman, George McNeil, Albert Swiden, Lassaw, Burgoyne Diller, and myself. It was on this occasion we decided to form a cooperative exhibition society. Therefore this association became the first actual meeting of the American Abstract Artists, and we were, in fact, its founders."

The AAA General Prospectus from January 29, 1937 lists 28 artists: "The present membership (January, 1937) of American Abstract Artists consists of the following names: George McNeil, Jeanne Carles, A. N. Christie, C. R. Holty, Harry Holtzman, Marie Kennedy, Ray Kaiser, W. M. Zogbaum, Ibram Lassaw, Gertrude Peter Greene, Byron Browne, Rosalind Bengelsdorf, George L. K. Morris, Vaclav Vyrlacil, Paul Kelpe, Balcomb Greene, R. D. Turnbull, Frederick J. Whiteman, John Opper, Albert Swinden, lIya Bolotowsky, George Cavallon, Leo Lances, Alice Mason, Esphyr Slobodkina, Werner Drewes, Richard Taylor, Josef Albers." This published membership list of 28 artists existed months before the list for the first exhibit in April 1937 with 39 founding members, showing a discrepancy or another version of the founding. Some accounts list these 28 artists as the charter or founding members of American Abstract Artists.

The following artists, considered American Abstract Artists founding members, participated in the first AAA exhibit in 1937 or were listed in the Present Membership in American Abstract Artists General Prospectus from January 1937.

- Josef Albers
- Rosalind Bengelsdorf
- Ilya Bolotowsky
- Harry Bowden
- Byron Browne
- Jeanne Carles (also called Mercedes Carles, later Mercedes Matter)
- Giorgio Cavallon
- Arthur N. Christie
- Anna Cohen
- Burgoyne Diller
- Werner Drewes
- Herzl Emanuel
- Robert Foster
- Balcomb Greene
- Gertrude Greene
- Hananiah Harari
- Carl Holty
- Harry Holtzman
- Ray Kaiser
- Frederick Kann
- Paul Kelpe
- Marie Kennedy
- Leo Lances
- Ibram Lassaw
- Agnes Lyall
- Alice Trumbull Mason
- Mercedes Matter (formerly Jeanne Carles)
- George McNeil
- George L. K. Morris
- John Opper
- Ralph Rosenborg
- Louis Schanker
- Charles Green Shaw
- Esphyr Slobodkina
- David Smith
- Albert Swinden
- Richard Taylor
- Rupert D. Turnbull
- Vaclav Vytlacil
- Rudolph Weisenborn
- Frederick J. Whiteman
- Wilfrid Zogbaum

== Geometric style ==
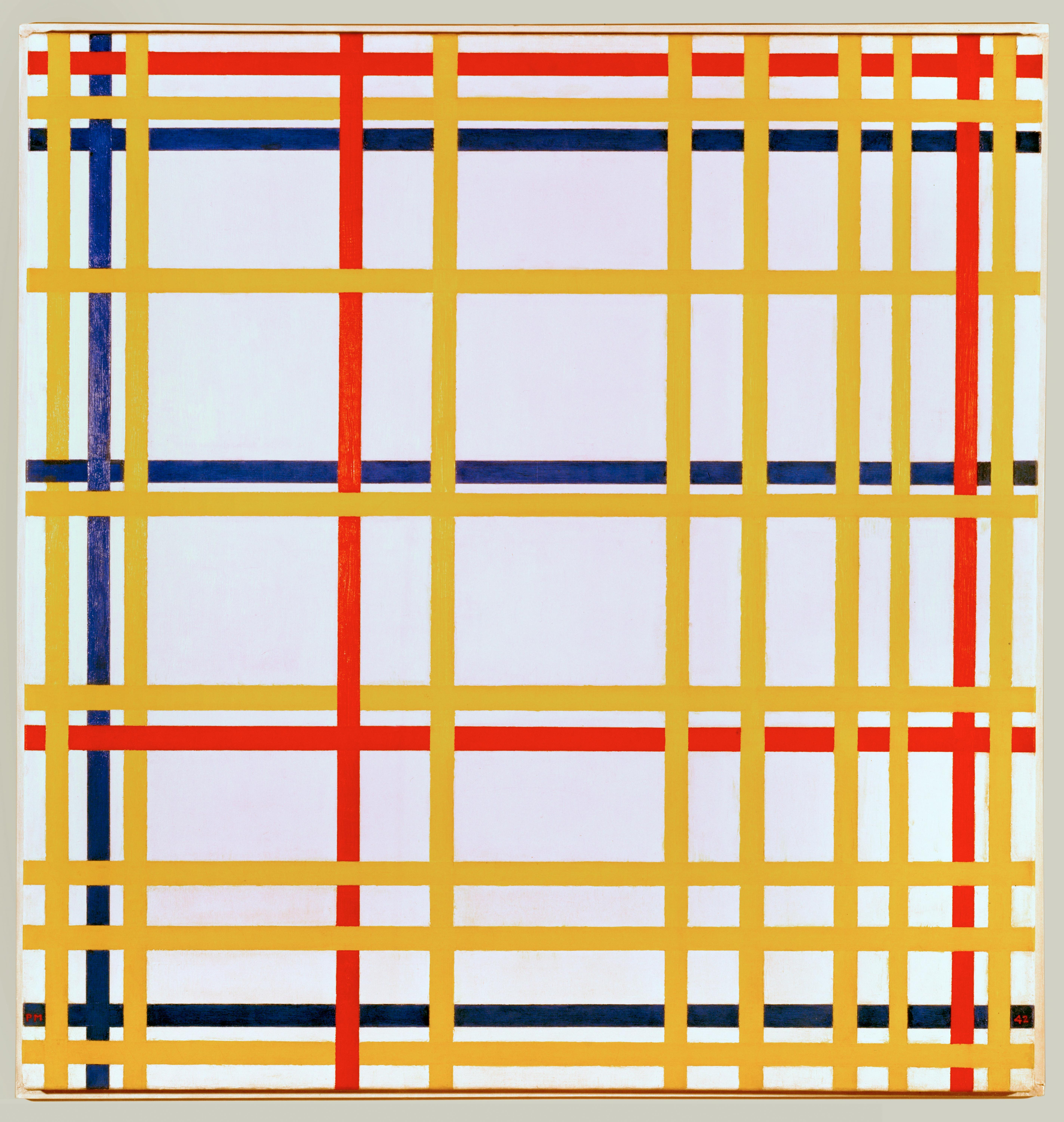
Piet Mondrian, New York City I, 1942

In the 1930s, Paris was the center of geometric abstraction that came out of Synthetic Cubism, Cercle et Carré, and Abstraction-Création. The start of World War II caused the focus of geometric abstraction to shift to New York City and the American Abstract Artists group. At its founding in 1937 AAA was tolerant and diverse in the types of abstract artwork created by the membership: biomorphic, cubist, and geometric. There was debate that AAA should have a definitive definition of abstract art but the membership could never agree. Instead the group focused on the difference between abstraction based on observation of the natural world and non-objective work which used non-referential invented forms generally involving geometric abstraction.

American Abstract Artists gathered originally to organize a group show. They would continue to meet and debate ideas about art, specifically the merits of pure abstraction opposed to abstraction based on subject matter. After 1937 the consensus among the membership was that imagery and the expression of things in a painting detracted from the idea that the painting was an object in itself. Opinions of how much subject matter and imagery were acceptable resulted in further acrimonious debates, and factions formed within the group. Many applicants for membership were rejected because their paintings were not abstract enough.

The geometric faction influenced the membership's work and the organization's policies, and by the late 1930s the AAA was a bastion of geometric abstraction. In a review in The New Yorker of the 1939 Annual Exhibit, Robert Coates said "the trend of the group is toward the purest of 'pure' abstraction, in which all recognizable symbols are abandoned in favor of strict geometric form." For the 1939 AAA Annual Exhibit, expressionist abstract art was eliminated by the exhibition committee during the selection and hanging of work for the show, a change from the group's original character and policies. In a Smithsonian Archives of American Art interview Ad Reinhardt discusses censorship in American Abstract Artists exhibits during the late 1930s when some members insisted on strict purity and urged that painters like Irene Rice Pereira, Louis Schanker and Byron Browne not be shown in the AAA exhibitions describing their shapes as gimmickry. Founder Jeanne Carles paintings took a different direction in abstraction from the group as well. Her work was reproduced in the 1938 Yearbook but she was excluded from the 1939 Yearbook even though she was listed as a member in the publication.

Piet Mondrian had a strong influence on the membership and Ilya Bolotowsky, Harry Holtzman, Burgoyne Diller, Alice Trumbull Mason and Charmion von Wiegand incorporated Mondrian's Neoplasticism into their painting further embeding AAA's aesthetic in geometric abstraction. The push for a geometric aesthetic continued with Paul Kelpe who was a founder, secretary, treasurer, and a controversial member. He was asked to resign his membership because his abstract shapes, inspired by Wassily Kandinsky and El Lissitzky, appeared to float illusionistically in three-dimensional space making his paintings too representational for the AAA. During the 1940s some members left the cooperative, including founders Rosalind Bengelsdorf and Ray Kaiser, because the organization abandoned a broad interpretation of abstraction for strict geometry.

The AAA helped abstract art gain acceptance among critics and audiences in the United States but only embraced a certain type of abstraction, work with a dynamic geometric clarity. AAA's members based their ideology and visual language on European modern art, specifically Cubism, Neoplasticism, and Constructivism. Clement Greenberg stated in 'American Type' Painting that Abstract Expressionism was the first manifestation of American art to draw serious attention in the United States and Europe, attacking the expendable conventions of art and influencing the avant-garde. With the popularity of abstract expressionism after World War II there was a dichotomy between geometric and gestural abstraction, which the group saw as American Abstract Artists vs. Abstract Expressionists. AAA preceded but ignored the rise of the "New York School" of Abstract Expressionism. The group remained separate from it, promoting pure geometric abstraction within AAA's ranks, and set itself apart from discussions about and reactions against Abstract Expressionism which included Post-Painterly Abstraction in the 1960s. The American Abstract Artists worked to develop a utopian vision of universal harmony using geometry and nonobjective art based on order and stability, free from references to the real world.
