= Jean Xceron =

Greek-American painter

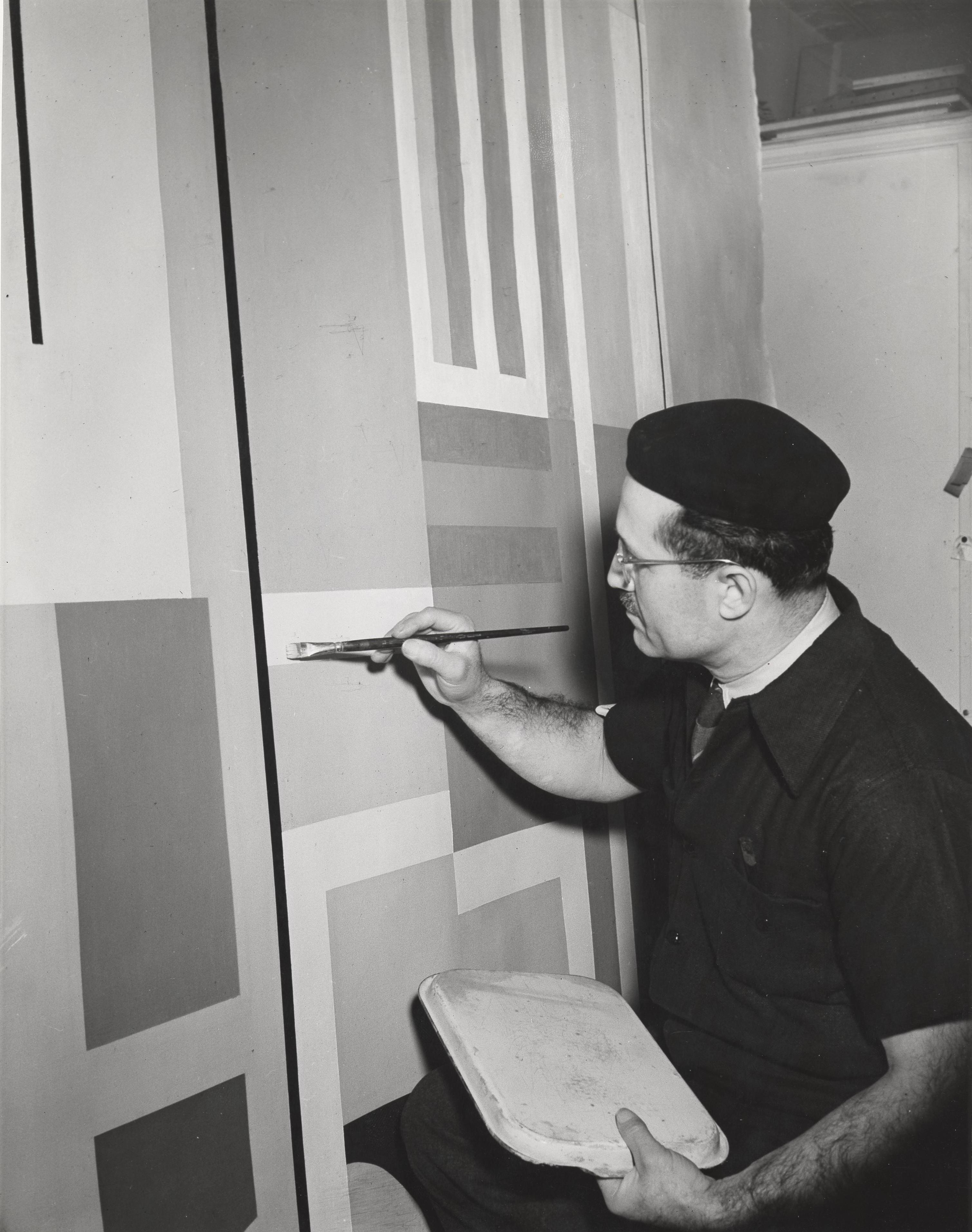
- Xceron working on a piece for the Federal Art Project, c. 1942, from the Archives of American Art
- Born: 1890; Isaris Village, Peloponese, Greece
- Died: 1967; New York, New York
- Known for: Painting
- Movement: Non-objective

Jean Xceron (1890–1967) was an American abstract painter of Greek origin born in a small village called Isaris, located in the Peloponese. He immigrated to the United States in 1904 and studied at the Corcoran School of Art. He worked at the Guggenheim Museum as a security guard for 28 years from 1939 to his death. He is described as a "pioneer of non-objective painting" by the Smithsonian Archives of American Art. His works are in the collections of the Smithsonian American Art Museum and the Hirshhorn Museum and Sculpture Garden.
