= Gertrude Greene =

American sculptor and painter

- Born: 1904; New York City, New York, United States
- Died: November 25, 1956 (aged 51–52); New York City, United States
- Education: Leonardo da Vinci Art School
- Known for: Painting; Sculpture
- Movement: Abstract

Gertrude Glass Greene (1904 – November 25, 1956) was an abstract sculptor and painter from New York City. Gertrude and her husband, artist Balcomb Greene, were heavily involved in political activism to promote mainstream acceptance of abstract art. They were founding members of the American Abstract Artists organization.

== Family life ==
Gertrude Glass was the daughter of Siegfried and Berta Glass who owned a department store in Brooklyn, New York. After completing high school, Gertrude went to evening sculpture classes at the Leonardo da Vinci Art School in New York City where she met other students who were interested in the new abstract style of art.

Glass married Balcomb Greene in 1926 after he graduated from Syracuse University, and traveled with him to Vienna, Austria, where he pursued graduate studies in psychology. The couple moved back to New York in 1927 where Balcomb attended Columbia University to study for a master's degree in English literature, while she continued study sculpture. Balcomb moved to Hanover, New Hampshire where he taught literature from 1928 to 1931 at Dartmouth College. Initially, Gertrude joined Balcomb in New Hampshire where she had a sculpture studio. But she preferred living in New York so left New Hampshire without Balcomb. After he quit teaching at Dartmouth, the couple traveled to Paris, France, for a year where for the only time during their marriage they shared a studio.

== Artist ==
Greene was one of the earliest American artists, possibly the first, to produce non-objective relief sculptures in the early 1930s. She synthesized Cubist and Russian Constructivists themes into her work. By the 1940s, her work showed her interest in Mondrian and Neo-Plasticism. She produced her last sculpture in 1946 and for the rest of life she concentrated on abstract painting. Nonetheless, her paintings never completely lost a "sense of architectural structure".

Grace Borgenicht Gallery had the first solo exhibition of her work in 1951, and another was held at the Bertha Schaefer Gallery in 1955. A painting of Greene's was chosen for the cover of Arts Magazine in April 1982, which featured an article about Greene's paintings, written by Jacqueline Moss. There was a retrospective of her work at ACA Gallery in 1982. Greene's work can be found in the permanent collections of the Museum of Modern Art in New York, the Brooklyn Museum, the Philadelphia Museum of Art, and the Berkshire Museum. In 2016 her biography was included in the exhibition catalogue Women of Abstract Expressionism organized by the Denver Art Museum.

== Political activism ==
Greene supported many liberal political causes affecting artists. She "encouraged the formation of WPA programs to help struggling artists" and was "an active member of the Federation of Painters and Sculptors, the Artists' Union, and a founding member of American Abstract Artists." Gertrude worked as a gallery attendant at the AAA's first annual exhibition, and was the group's first paid employee. The Greenes were active with the AAA committees, and worked to gain acceptance of abstract art by picketing museums that did not feature works of abstract artist. Lee Krasner called Greene an "up front" person and said she was one of the most active members of the AAA.

== Death ==
Her health rapidly deteriorated and on November 25, 1956, Gertrude died at a New York City hospital of cancer.
