= Ibram Lassaw =

American sculptor and abstract artist

- Ibram Lassaw and Charles C. Withers, 1955 Sep 13 / unidentified photographer. American Federation of Arts records, Archives of American Art, Smithsonian Institution.
- Born: May 4, 1913; Alexandria, Eyalet of Egypt
- Died: December 30, 2003 (aged 90)
- Education: Clay Club, City College of New York, Beaux-Arts Institute of Design
- Known for: Sculpture
- Movement: Abstract expressionism

Ibram Lassaw (May 4, 1913 – December 30, 2003) was an Egyptian-born American sculptor of Russian heritage, known for non-objective construction in brazed metals.

== Early life and education ==
Lassaw was born on May 4, 1913, in Alexandria, Egypt, of Russian Jewish émigré parents. He moved to the United States in 1921, and the family settled in Brooklyn, New York. He became a United States citizen in 1928.

He first studied sculpture in 1926 at the Clay Club (now SculptureCenter) with Dorothea H. Denslow, and later at the Beaux-Arts Institute of Design in New York. He made abstract paintings and drawings influenced by Kandinsky, Sophie Taeuber-Arp, and other artists. He also attended the City College of New York.

== Career ==
Influenced by his study of art history and readings in European art magazines, Lassaw began to make sculpture in the late 1920s. He was among the "small group of artists committed themselves to abstract art during the 1930s." In his work, Ibram Lassaw "replaced the monolithic solidity of cast metal with open-space constructions obtained by welding."

During the mid-1930s, Lassaw worked briefly for the Public Works of Art Project cleaning sculptural monuments around New York City. He subsequently joined the WPA as a teacher and sculptor until he was drafted into the army in 1942. Lassaw's contribution to the advancement of sculptural abstraction went beyond mere formal innovation; his promotion of modernist styles during the 1930s did much to insure the growth of abstract art in the United States. He was one of the founding members of the American Abstract Artists group in 1937, and served as president of the American Abstract Artists organization from 1946 to 1949.

Lassaw is a sculptor who was a part of the New York School of Abstract expressionism during the 1940s and 1950s. Jackson Pollock, Lee Krasner, James Brooks, John Ferren, Willem de Kooning, and several other artists like Lassaw spent summers on the south fork of Long Island. Lassaw spent summers on Long Island from 1955 until he moved there permanently in 1963.

== See also ==
- Abstract expressionism
- New York School

== Sources ==
- John Lynch, Metal sculpture; new forms, new techniques p. 99; p. 135
- Scultura in America (Roma : Edizioni della cometa, 1990.) p. 73–82
- 200 years of American sculpture (New York: David R. Godine in association with the Whitney Museum of American Art, ©1976.) p. 181; p. 183; p. 184; p. 286
