= Balcomb Greene =

American painter

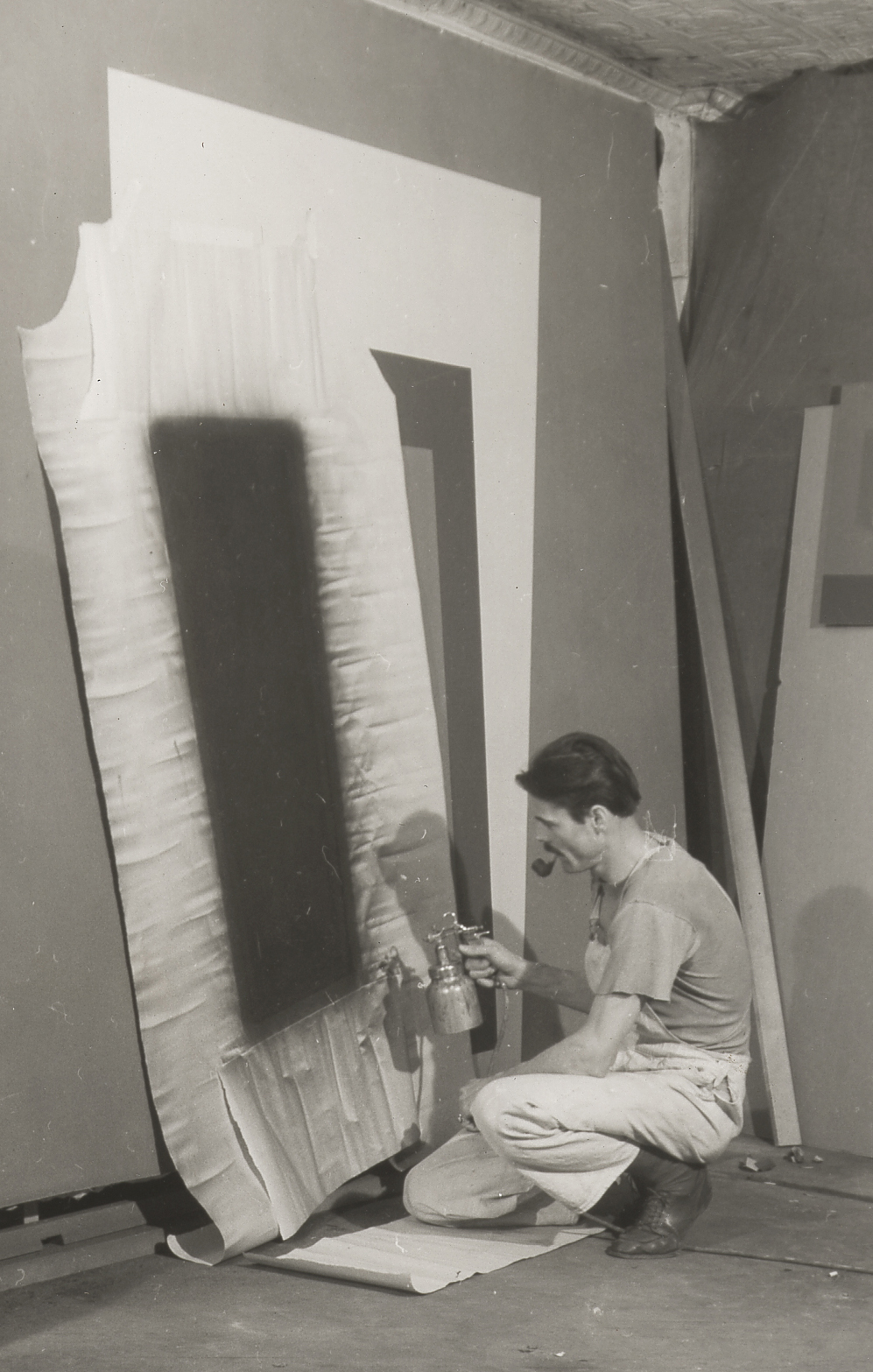
- Greene in 1939
- Born: May 22, 1904; Millville, New York, U.S.
- Died: November 12, 1990 (aged 86); Montauk Point, New York, U.S.
- Known for: Abstract artist, Abstract expressionist and artist of New York Figurative Expressionism

Balcomb Greene (1904–1990) was an American artist and teacher. He and his wife, artist Gertrude Glass Greene, were heavily involved in political activism to promote mainstream acceptance of abstract art and were founding members of the American Abstract Artists organization. His early style was completely non-objective. Juan Gris and Piet Mondrian as well as Pablo Picasso and Henri Matisse influenced his early style. From the 1940s his work "opened out to the light and space of natural form." He painted landscapes and figure. "He discerned the pain of a man, and hewed to it integrally from beginning to end…. In his study of the figure he did not stress anatomical shape but rather its intuitive, often conflicting spirit."

Balcomb Greene contributed to modernist cause through his writings: "It is actually the artist, and only he, who is equipped for approaching the individual directly. The abstract artist can approach man through the most immediate of aesthetic experiences, touching below consciousness and the veneer of attitudes, contacting the whole ego rather than the ego on the defensive."

== Biography ==
Balcomb (John Wesley) Greene was born on May 22, 1904, Millville, New York.

He studied from 1922 to 1926 at Syracuse University, where he received his BA degree. In 1927 he studied English literature at Columbia University. Greene taught English literature at Dartmouth College from 1928 to 1931. In 1931 he went to Paris and studied art at the Académie de la Grande Chaumière.

Soon after his return to New York in 1933, he realized that his true interest was painting. He started "to work for the Emily Francis Contemporary Gallery, a non-profit organization that showed particular interest in American artists and had exhibited the work of Bradley Walker Tomlin and Mark Tobey." In 1935 he became the first president of the Artists Union and in 1936 the first chairman of the American Abstract Artists (AAA). In the late 1930s he was employed by the New York mural division of the Federal Art Project (WPA), and completed abstract murals for the Williamsburg Houses (Brooklyn Museum, on long-term loan from the New York City Housing Authority) and the Public Health Building of the 1939 New York World's Fair (destroyed). Also in 1939 and 1941 he was re-elected as chairman of American Abstract Artists, but resigned from that organization in 1942, when he began a career as a professor of art history and aesthetics.

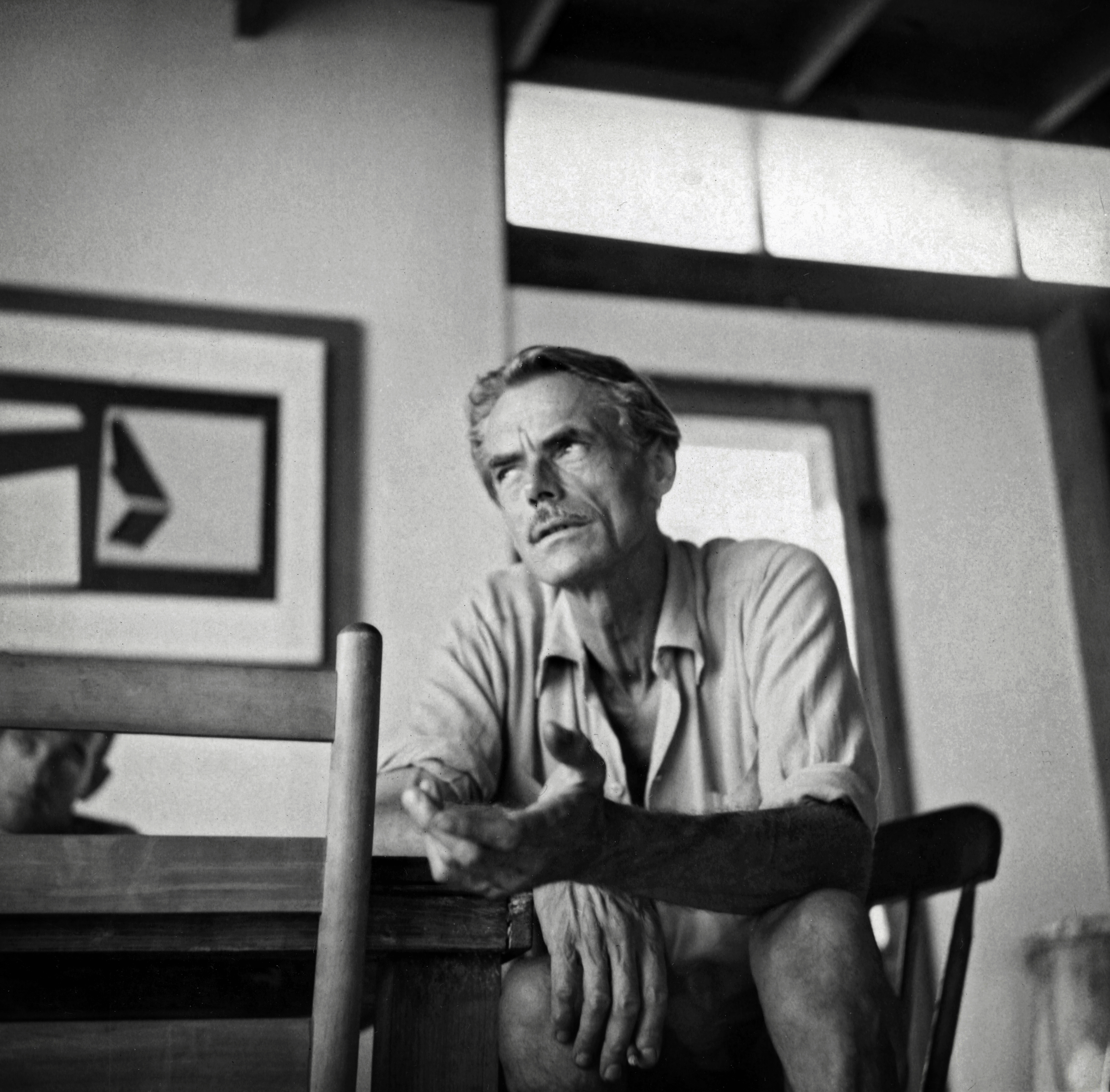
Artist Balcomb Greene at his Montauk, Long Island home, September 1957, in conversation with Philip Pearlstein and others (not shown) by Stuart Talcroft. Digital image by Colin Talcroft © 2024

After receiving his master's degree in art history (New York University, 1943), Greene taught at Carnegie Institute of Technology, Pittsburgh, while also continuing to pursue a career as an artist. Gertrude Greene stayed in New York, and the couple shared a studio on Montauk, Long Island, during summer breaks. Greene worked alone to pursue his solitary style but at the same time, he was familiar with the Abstract Expressionist movement. He wrote in Art News, "The Fourth Illusions, or Hunger for Genius" "A picture is painted of modern art that arranges all participants into movements, like well-behaved Englishmen in clubs." In spite of his conviction, he agreed to participate in the invitational New York Painting and Sculpture Annuals organized by the New York School artists in 1954, 1955 and 1957. In 1972 he was elected into the National Academy of Design as an Associate member.

Greene granted interviews to Jacqueline Moss, who was researching his wife for her master's thesis, published in 1980.

Balcomb Greene died November 12, 1990, in Montauk Point, New York.

== Selected solo exhibitions ==
His first solo shows were in Paris in 1937, and at J. B. Newmann's New Art Circle, in New York, in 1947. From 1950 to 1961 he exhibited annually at Bertha Schaefer Gallery, New York, where his 1950, 1955, and 1956 exhibitions were nominated by Art News as among the year's ten best. He exhibited at the American University, Washington, D.C. In 1961 Balcomb Greene had a retrospective exhibition at the Whitney Museum of American Art, New York City in 1961. The same year had solo exhibitions at the Everhart Museum, Scranton, Pennsylvania; at the Carnegie Institute in Pittsburgh, Pennsylvania; at Mount Holyoke College, South Hadley, Massachusetts; Bowdoin College, Brunswick, Minnesota; University of Massachusetts, Amherst; Munson-Williams-Proctor Institute Utica, New York. He continued to have one man shows at the Saidenberg Gallery in New York from 1962 to 1968. He had several other solo exhibitions: Feingarten Gallery, Los Angeles, in 1963 and 1964. He had solo exhibitions in 1965 at the University Gallery, University of Florida. Gainesville and at the Tampa Art Institute, Tampa, Florida. He had solo shows in 1966 at the Phoenix Art Museum, Phoenix, Arizona and at the Main Street Galleries, Chicago. He had solo exhibitions at the Adele Bednarz Galleries, in Los Angeles from 1966 to 1969 and also in 1971. 1972 and 1974. From 1967 to 1969 Balcomb Greene had solo shows at the Brenson Galleries, in Bal Harbour, Florida. From 1974 to 1977 he had solo exhibitions at the Harmon Gallery in Naples, Florida and in 1977 also had a solo exhibition at the ACA Galleries, in New York City.

Balcomb Greene in 1976 was given the Altman First Prize in Figure Painting and the same year he became the member of the National Institute of Arts and Letters.

== Artworks in public collections ==
- Ball State University (formerly Teachers College), Muncie, Indiana;
- Baltimore Museum of Art, Baltimore, Maryland;
- Brooklyn Museum, Brooklyn;
- Carnegie Institute of Technology, Pittsburgh;
- Cleveland Museum of Art, Cleveland;
- The Art Institute of Chicago, Chicago;
- Corcoran Gallery of Art, Washington, D.C.;
- Guild Hall, East Hampton, New York;
- Wadsworth Atheneum. Hartford, Connecticut;
- Museum of Fine Arts, Houston;
- Indianapolis Museum of Art, Indianapolis;
- University of North Carolina;
- Massachusetts Institute of Technology, Cambridge, Massachusetts;
- Metropolitan Museum of Art, New York;
- Museum of Modern Art, New York;
- Metropolitan Life Insurance;
- University of Miami, Miami, Florida;
- National Museum of American Art, Washington, D.C.;
- University of Nebraska–Lincoln;
- University of North Carolina;
- Joslyn Art Museum, Omaha, Nebraska
- Pennsylvania Academy of the Fine Arts, Philadelphia;
- Norton Simon Museum, Pasadena, California;
- Portland Art Museum, Portland, Oregon;
- Neuberger Museum, Purchase, New York;
- Solomon R. Guggenheim Museum, New York;
- Parrish Museum, Southampton, New York;
- University of Texas;
- Vassar College, Poughkeepsie;
- University of Virginia, Richmond, Virginia;
- Whitney Museum of American Art, New York;
- Walker Art Center, Minneapolis
- Butler Institute of American Art, Youngstown, Ohio.
- Boca Museum of Art, Boca Raton, Florida.

== See also ==
- Art movement
- Abstract expressionism
- New York School
- Action painting
- Expressionism
