= Giorgio Cavallon =

Italian-American painter

- Born: March 3, 1904; Sorico, Italy
- Died: December 22, 1989 (aged 85); New York City, New York, United States
- Known for: Painting
- Movement: Abstract expressionism;

Giorgio Cavallon (March 3, 1904 – December 22, 1989) was a founding member of the American Abstract Artists and a pioneer Abstract Expressionist.

== Biography ==
Giorgio Cavallon was born March 3, 1904, in Sorio, a hamlet of the municipality of Gambellara near Vicenza Italy and immigrated to the US in 1920. He became a US citizen in 1929.

In 1926, Cavallon studied at the National Academy of Design, New York City. In 1927 and 1928, he studied with Charles Hawthorne, Provincetown, Massachusetts, and from 1934, he studied during the evening with Hans Hofmann's School of Fine Art.

== Career ==
In 1934, Cavallon was employed in the Works Progress Administration/Federal Art Project (WPA/FAP) Easel & Mural Division as Arshile Gorky's assistant.

In 1936, Cavallon joined other like-minded artists in founding the American Abstract Artists group. This major movement of abstract art in America began in the 1930s with a strong direction toward an emphasis in structural quality in art. Juan Gris statement sums up the movement:

Artists have thought to produce a poetic effect with a beautiful model or beautiful subjects. We on the other hand believe that we can produce it with beautiful elements, for those of the intellect are certainly the most beautiful. By the end of the 1940s Giorgio Cavallon connected to the early generation of New York School Abstract Expressionist artists whose artistic innovation by the 1950s had been recognized across the Atlantic, including Paris.

In 1949, Cavallon joined the "Artists' Club" located at 39 East 8th Street. He was chosen by his fellow artists to show in the Ninth Street Show held on May 21-June 10, 1951. The show was located at 60 East 9th Street on the first floor and the basement of a building which was about to be demolished.

The artists celebrated not only the appearance of the dealers, collectors and museum people on the 9th Street, and the consequent exposure of their work but they celebrated the creation and the strength of a living community of significant dimensions.

He participated from 1951 to 1957 in the invitational New York Painting and Sculpture Annuals including the Ninth Street Show. He was among the 24 out of a total 256 New York School artists who was included in all the Annuals. These Annuals were important because the participants were chosen by the artists themselves.

Cavallon died on December 22, 1989, at New York Hospital. He was 85 years old and lived in Manhattan.

== Selected solo exhibitions ==
- 1932: Bottega d'Arte, Venice, Italy
- 1934: A.C.A. Gallery, New York City
- 1940: Eight Street Playhouse Gallery, New York City
- 1946, 1948: Eagen Gallery, New York City
- 1957: Stable Gallery, New York City
- 1963: Kootz Gallery, New York City
- 1964: Weatherspoon Gallery, University of North Carolina at Greensboro, North Carolina
- 1971, 1976: A.M. Sachs Gallery, New York City
- 1977: Neuberger Museum, Purchase, New York City
- 1977, 1981, 1986: Gruenebaum Gallery, New York City
- 1989: Paintings from the 1960s, Jason McCoy, Inc., New York City
- 1989: Manny Silverman Gallery, Los Angeles, California
- 1990: A Retrospective View, William Benton Museum of Art, University of Connecticut, Storrs, Connecticut

== Selected public collections ==
- Albright-Knox Art Gallery, Buffalo, New York
- Chase Manhattan Bank, New York City, New York
- Fogg Museum, Harvard University Art Museums, Cambridge, Massachusetts
- Grey Art Gallery, New York University, Manhattan, New York
- Rhode Island School of Design, Providence, Rhode Island
- Prudential Insurance Company of America, Newark, New Jersey
- Singer Manufacturing Co., New York City, New York
- The Bank of New York, New York City, New York
- Museum of Modern Art, New York City, New York
- The Solomon R. Guggenheim Museum, New York City, New York
- Whitney Museum of American Art, New York City, New York
- University Art Museum, Berkeley, California

== External links for images ==
- Giorgio Cavallon on artnet
- American Abstract Artists

== See also ==
- Art movement
- Abstract Imagists
- Abstract expressionism
- New York School
- Action painting
- Ninth Street Show
