= It is. A Magazine for Abstract Art =

Limited edition abstract arts magazine

- Editor: Philip Pavia
- Categories: Fine arts periodical
- Frequency: irregular
- Format: All but one issue is four-color, heavily illustrated paperback, with writing from contributing artists
- Circulation: Limited edition: No more than 8,000 per issue
- Publisher: Second Half Publishing
- Founder: Philip Pavia
- Founded: 1958
- First issue: Spring 1958
- Final issue Number: Autumn 1965; Issue No. 6
- Based in: New York City
- Language: English

It is. A Magazine for Abstract Art (Spring 1958 – Autumn 1965) was an influential limited edition fine arts magazine that only published six issues in its seven years of existence. Founded by the abstract expressionist sculptor Philip Pavia, the magazine's contributors included a who's who of some of the 20th century's most important artists. Although it primarily focused on painters and sculptors like Willem de Kooning, Franz Kline, Helen Frankenthaler, Jackson Pollock and Isamu Noguchi, it also published artists of other kinds, like musician John Cage and poet Allen Ginsberg. Collectively, the magazines served to catalyze, and catalogue, the contemporaneous life cycle of abstract expressionist thought, from creation to mature expression. Reference to the magazine appears in the archives of Picasso, Motherwell and André Breton, as well as collector Peggy Guggenheim, critic Clement Greenberg and nearly two dozen others.

== History ==
=== The Founder ===
The London Times described Pavia as a "[s]culptor and champion of Abstract Expressionism who did much to shift the epicentre of Modernism from Paris to New York," citing an anecdote about Pavia telling fellow artists in 1949 that the second half of the century would belong to New York. Pavia would go on to organize the New York art community in the spirit of French salons, but in practice as an extension of the Federal Art Project, which he later described as an important training ground for the group that pioneered abstract expressionism:

Imagine thousands of artists in all forty-eight states getting paid to work as artists. They really learned how to paint during the program even though everyone was doing all kinds of things; making caricatures, cartoons, illustrations—it didn’t matter. That was the point: they were practicing, training themselves, so that when Abstract Expressionism came around they were ready. If it weren’t for the WPA we wouldn’t have had artists coming together like that. When the war was over in 1945, all of a sudden it was a different story.

=== The Club ===
Pavia's first independent American-style salon was known as "The Club" (1949–1955). Participants included Willem de Kooning, Franz Kline, Ibram Lassaw and others. Later, Pavia created a more formal structure for it, so it would serve as an intellectual and social forum for artists to debate and define abstract expressionism. Lectures by luminaries like Joseph Campbell, John Cage and Hannah Arendt, and bi-weekly discussions nurtured artists’ theories. Dislike of French Surrealist influence and challenges to the validity of formalist arguments were common. In 1951, Pavia initiated annual exhibitions with the 9th Street Art Exhibition.

=== The Magazine ===
In 1956, Pavia resigned from the club, and within two years he had published the first edition of the magazine, with the help of his wife painter and former ARTnews critic Natalie Edgar. Their vision was to create a magazine by artists for artists; the goal was to provide a forum to explore ideas in art, while actively championing both emerging and established artists. Pavia served as designer, editor, and "partisan publisher," and also wrote commentary, under the pen name P.G. Pavia. In addition to publishing original writing on art in multiple formats (reviews, essays, transcripts, commentaries) and reproductions of work by some of the leading artists and thinkers of the 20th century, the magazine also published the definitive account of mid-century sculpture in New York, which Pavia and Edgar later collected in a separate book.

Although author and critic Gwen Allen, in Artists' Magazines: An Alternative Space for Art, simply describes the magazine as "important," the series served to catalyze, and catalogue, the creation and mature expression of abstract expressionist thought in the U.S. Contributors included some of the 20th century's most important abstract expressionist artists, including Barnett Newman, Hans Hofman, Marc Rothko, Arshile Gorky, Philip Guston, and many others in the New York School, along with Jackson Pollock and other key figures in action painting and art critic Harold Rosenberg whose influential essay "The American Action Painters" drew on Pavia's earlier in-person "Club" meetings. But it also included artists of other kinds, including composer John Cage writing "A Lecture on Something," Allen Ginsberg writing on "Abstraction in Poetry," and Pavia, advocating for neglected forms of art in a contrarian vein. In an open letter to Leslie Katz in 1959, the then new publisher of Arts Magazine, he wrote: "I am begging you to give the representational artist a better deal. The neglected representational and near-abstract artists, not the abstractionists, need a champion these days."

The post-war production of significant writing by artists on art, both in Paris and New York was common to the period, but Pavia's efforts attracted a broader range of participants, and his magazine's mission was more ambitious: It featured all, or nearly all, of the painters and sculptors — so-called Irascibles — who boycotted the Metropolitan Museum of Art's upcoming "monster exhibition" because of the jury's rejection of "advanced art." Their protest got them photographed for Life Magazine and, later, published by Pavia, along with all the many schools of abstract expressionism: action painting, color field, lyrical abstraction, tachisme, Nuagisme and so on. In keeping with that eclecticism, Pavia also published "[c]ritical writing, manifestos and statements by fellow artists ... printed alongside reproductions of new work. The periodical was structured as an artists’ archive for abstract expressionism during the mature phase of the movement." Although budgetary constraints meant very few copies of the magazine were ever printed: For the first five issues only 2000, and for the final issue four times that, enthusiastic artists helped distribute the magazine to other artists throughout North America and Europe. By 1965, however, the "magazine ceased publication due to financial difficulties."

== Influence ==
- Nigel Whiteley in Art and Pluralism: Lawrence Alloway's Cultural Criticism describes how Pavia's magazine, which Alloway described as "required reading for anybody interested in knowing what time it was," directly inspired Alloway to create his own avant-garde magazine Number, in 1959.
- All of the famed action painters — Pollock, Philip Guston, Michael Goldberg, Norman Bluhm, Helen Frankenthaler — appeared in the magazine, and first formulated their ideas there: "In a symposium in all over painting published in the second issue ... Martin James summarized ... the 'assumptions, content, and consequences'"of action painting, which he called "a meaningful integration of plastic solutions and attitudes to the world," characterized by "immediacy"and "conviction," rather than a fixed truth.
- Art critic Harold Rosenberg’s influential essay “'The American Action Painters'” (1952) evolved from Club panels convened by Pavia on “problems” of Abstract Expressionism," and he also contributed writing on similar topics in the magazine.
- In 1959, Yves Gaucher (1934-2000), one of Canada's leading abstract artists began exploring America's contemporary art scene through regular visits to New York and regular reading of Pavia's magazine.
- Nearly two dozen celebrated arts figures with archives at the Archives of American Art, the Getty Research Institute and the Stanford University Libraries refer to Pavia's magazine, including Picasso, Robert Motherwell, André Breton, Peggy Guggenheim, Clement Greenberg and several others.

== Content ==
=== Issue No. 1 (Spring 1958) ===
Though brief, the 32-page inaugural edition was printed on paper roughly the size of a typewritten page, so big enough to showcase large pieces of sculpture or single paintings. Content included such mid-century greats as Landis Lewitin, Michael Lakakis, Reubin Nakian, Philip Guston, William de Kooning, Ad Reinholt, Ernie Briggs, Enrico Donati, John Ferren, Robert Goodnough, Raoul Hague, David Hare, Carl Holty, Angelo Ippolito, Franz Kline, Elaine de Kooning, Al Kotin, Ibram Lassaw, Mercedes Matter, Constantino Nivola, Ray Parker, Milton Resnick, James Rosati, Ludwig Sander, David Slivka, George Spaventa, Estaban Vincente, Alfred Duhrssen, Jack Tworkov and Wilfrid Zogbaum. The commentary in the introductory issue also included text by Hubert Crehan, Michael Goldberg, Nicholas Marsicano, E.A. Navaretta, Ad Reinhardt, Ruthven Todd and Pavia.

=== Issue No. 2 (Autumn 1958) ===
This 80-page edition included text by John Asher, Morton Feldman, John Ferren, Aristodimos Kaldis, Piet Mondrian, E.A. Navaretta, Fairfield Porter and statements, cahier and art by George Cavallon, Jack Tworkov, Peter Agostini, James Brooks, Norman Bluhm, among many others, along with it an array of commentary, spanning reviews, opinions, letters to the editor, transcripts, essays and statements. The cover art for this issue is believed to be by Willem de Kooning.

=== Issue No. 3 (Winter-Spring 1959) ===
This was the sole edition with sewn binding. The 80-page third edition featured a series of essays: Hubert Crehan's "A Little Room for Feeling"; Sidney Geist's "Face Front"; Allen Ginsberg's "Abstraction in Poetry"; Elaine de Kooning's "Editor of a Hearsay Panel"; Merle Marsicano's "Thoughts on Dance"; Mercedes Matter's "Drawing"; George McNeil's "Spontaneity"; John Stephan and May Natalie Tabak's respective book reviews, and Pavia's "Manifesto-In-Progress III." The cover art for this issue is by Robert Motherwell.

=== Issue No. 4 (Autumn 1959) ===
William Baziotes created the cover art for this 80-page issue, which also included artists statements by Peter Agostini, Mary Bonnell, Peter Busa, Alfred Jensen, Elaine de Kooning, Albert Kotin, Adja Yunkers, among others. Cahiers by Robert Goldwater, and Jack Tworkov. Essays included: Andre Breton's "A Catalogue Foreword"; Hans Hofmann's "Space and Pictorial Life"; Harry Holtzman's "The Sickness... the Hero"; Ad Reinhardt's "Seven Quotes"; and "Manifesto IV" by P.G. Pavia. Artists' reproductions included work by Nicholas Carone, Arshile Gorky, Philip Guston, Emil Hess, Aristodimos Kaldis, Allan Kaprow, Frederick J. Kiesler, Franz Kline, Ibram Lassaw, Alice Mason, Mark Rothko, and numerous others.

=== Issue No. 5 (Spring 1960) ===
This 85-page issue included commentary, artist's statements and cahier by Pavia, Norman Bluhm, Hoseki Shin'ichi, Paul Jenkins, Lester Johnson, William Littlefield, Harold Rosenberg, Alfred Russell, Jon Schueler, Jack Tworkow, Robert Vaughan, and several others. Reproductions included work by Larry Rivers, Milton Resnick, Will Barnet, Ronald Bladen, Seymour Boardman, Charles Cajori, John Chamberlain, Enrico Donati, Edward Dugmore, John Ferren, Helen Frankenthaler, Mathias Goeritz, Lee Mullican, Robert Rauschenberg, James Rosati, Alfred Russell, Salvatore Scarpitta, Jon Schueller, Estaban Vicente, Wilfrid Zogbaum and others.

=== Issue No. 6 (Autumn 1965) ===
The final edition of the magazine was 134 pages, and featured more than 90 plates and fold-out illustrations of New York sculptors at work, as well as the transcripts to the two-part "Waldorf Panels," held by "The Club" on February 17, 1965, and March 17, 1965. The panels were an invitation-only series on sculpture by sculptors, touching on "the status of found objects ... thoughts on spontaneity vs. design ... the expanding definition of sculpture ... [and] perspectives on Surrealism and Pop Art. Natalie Edgar, Isobel Grossman and John McMahon edited the transcripts. Pavia moderated the panels, which included: Herbert Ferber, Reuben Kadish, James Rosati, Bernard Rosenthal, Isamu Noguchi, Claes Oldenburg, George Segal, George Sugarman, James Wines. The 90 reproductions included work by Calvin Albert, Louise Bourgeois, Fritz Bultman, Nicolas Carone, Herbert Ferber, John Ferren, Peter Grippe, Elaine de Kooning, Robert Mallary, Enzio Martinelli, Louise Nevelson, Costantino Nivola, Savatore Scarpitta, Sahl Swarz among others.

== Public collections ==
- Brooklyn Public Library
- City University of New York (CUNY)
- Harvard Library
- Museu d'Art Contemporani de Barcelona
- Museu Nacional d'Art de Catalunya
- Museum of Modern Art (MOMA)
- The New School: New School Libraries & Archives
- New York Public Library System
- Pratt Institute Libraries
