= Natalie Edgar =

American painter (born 1932)

- Born: 1932 (age 93–94); New York City, United States
- Education: Brooklyn College, Columbia University
- Occupations: Painter, art critic, art historian
- Known for: Painting, expertise in abstract expressionism
- Style: Abstract expressionism
- Spouse: Philip Pavia
- Children: Luigi (b. 1968; d. 2012), Paul (b. 1971)

Natalie Edgar (born 1932) is an American abstract expressionist painter, a former critic for ARTnews, and a key writer and historian on the birth and development of abstract expressionism.

== Career ==
As a painter, Edgar has been classified as a "wom[a]n artist who broke the rules," and her lively, and often large, abstractions typically include a "mass of layered colors—with multiple glazes, opacities, broad areas laid down in washes" while "using dynamic strokes and contrasting tones [that] ... juxtapose[s] color with areas of vacant canvas." Her skill and interests built on early art training at Brooklyn College with Mark Rothko, Ad Reinhardt, Burgoyne Diller, Alfred Russell, Harry Holzman, Martin James, and a degree in art history from Columbia University. That background laid the groundwork for a life-long appreciation for abstraction, which spanned reviews for Isamu Noguchi, Norman Bluhm, Esteban Vicente and Franz Kline as well as a 1965 review on "The Satisfactions of Robert Motherwell" for ARTnews, in which she explained her thinking about abstraction this way:

The almost-star could be a starfish, two ovals suggest anatomy, an egg-shape might be an egg, a blot a cocoon, a rumpled paper bag evokes the many lives it passed through, an almost-arch strains to bend more or straighten out, almost-triangle yearns to be perfect. They assume the capability needed to reach their ideals at one extreme, or, at the other extreme, their freedom in abstract invention. From familiar shapes they are transfigured into dramatic images.

Edgar has written and collaborated on many long-form projects on the early history of Abstract Expressionism. Her book Club Without Walls documents the movement's birth and development at the 8th Street Club. Collaborative work with husband and sculptor Phillip Pavia, also on The Club, is now archived at Emory University's research libraries. Edgar has also served as a source for scholarly research on the movement's origins at MOMA and in interviews with author Mary Gabriel for Ninth Street Women, a book about five women painters who changed modern art.

== Solo exhibitions ==
- Natalie Edgar: From Above, Woodward Gallery, New York, NY, 2010.
- Watercolor Paper Edgar, Woodward Gallery, New York, NY, 2001.
- Natalie Edgar: New Works, Woodward Gallery, New York, NY, 1999.
- Disclosure, Woodward Gallery, New York, NY, 1997.
- Natalie Edgar, Abstract Paintings, Museo dei Bozzetti, Pietrasanta, Italy, 1993.

== Awards ==
- Pollock-Krasner Foundation Grant Recipient, 2010.

== Bibliography of Edgar's writings ==
- Philip Pavia, overview of career with 50 plates, introduction by Gerald Nordland, John Isaacs Books, 2009.
- Club Without Walls, Edited book of Selections from the Journal of Philip Pavia (ISBN 978-1-877675-64-5, Published by MidMarch Arts Press), 2007.
- Archives of the Club and It is Magazine, organized by Natalie Edgar, Woodruff Library, Emory University, Atlanta, GA, 2005.
- ARTnews, 1959–1973, staff writer. Articles on Isamu Noguchi, Norman Bluhm, Esteban Vicente, Robert Motherwell, the Spanish School, Peter Agostini, Louise Bourgois, Frederick Kiesler.
- Art/World, 1979-1980, contributor, articles on George Spaventa, Joseph Beuys, Robert Motherwell, Piero Dorazio, Milton Resnick, Franz Kline, Michael Heizer, Robert Ryman, Mary Miss.
- Fritz Glarner, 1966–1967, exhibition originated in San Francisco Museum of Art and traveled to Philadelphia Museum of Contemporary Art. Curated show and wrote catalogue.

== Personal life ==
Edgar was married to the abstract expressionist sculptor Philip Pavia. The couple had two sons: Their elder son Luigi died in 2012. Their younger son Paul is a sculptor.
