= Landès Lewitin =

American painter and theorist

- Born: Isaac Moussa Landes Lewitin; November 14, 1892
- Died: January 20, 1966 (aged 73)

Landès Lewitin (November 14, 1892 – 20 January 1966) was an American painter and theorist associated with the postwar New York School. Born in Cairo and trained in Paris, he became a founding member of The Club, a central discussion forum for artists involved in Abstract Expressionism. Known for his use of color, collage, and symbolism, Lewitin exhibited widely but remained philosophically independent of dominant art world trends.

== Early life and education ==
Lewitin was born in Cairo, Egypt, to Romanian-Jewish parents in 1892. He studied painting in Cairo and later in Paris, where he encountered early modernist and Symbolist influences. He emigrated to the United States in 1916, eventually settling in Greenwich Village, New York City. In 1928 he returned to Paris, until returning to New York at the outbreak of the war.

== Career ==
Lewitin was known for his richly colored paintings, intricate collages, and symbolic visual language. His experiments with surface included the use of tiny glass beads, combed pigments, and handwritten annotations. He produced numerous visual notebooks and diagrams related to color theory, myth, and perception.

He was represented during his career by the Egan Gallery in the 1940s, followed by the Rose Fried Gallery through the mid-1960s, and finally by the Royal Marks Gallery near the end of his life.

Lewitin participated in several significant group exhibitions, including:

- All of the Stable Gallery Annual Exhibitions of Painting and Sculpture (1953–1957)
- Sixteen Americans (1959–1960), Museum of Modern Art (MoMA)
- Hallmark Art Award exhibition (1960), Fifth Year Exhibition
- The Art of Assemblage (1961), MoMA
- Collage (1948), MoMA
- Abstract Expressionist New York (2010–2011), MoMA

His work was reviewed in major art journals, including multiple articles by critic Thomas B. Hess in Art News.

== The Club and intellectual influence ==
Lewitin was a founding figure of The Club, formed in 1949 by artists including Philip Pavia. He was the first name listed on the club’s 1952 charter membership list and was instrumental in shaping its intellectual direction. Artist Jeanne Patterson Miles later described him, along with Pavia, as "the backbone of the Club."

The Club hosted weekly discussions that brought together artists, critics, and curators, playing a key role in the development of postwar American modernism.

== Critical reception ==
Lewitin’s career remained somewhat apart from the commercial art market, but his peers and critics respected his theoretical contributions and symbolic approach. He was featured in symposiums in Art News, including "Is Today’s Artist With or Against the Past?" (1958) and "The Private Myth" (1961). In his 1960 review of Lewitin’s solo show at Rose Fried Gallery, Thomas Hess highlighted his inclusion in Sixteen Americans and reproduced his painting Juno.

== Selected works ==
Notable works by Lewitin include:

- Innocence in a Labyrinth (1940), cut-and-pasted photo-engravings, MoMA, object no. 6.1948
- Untitled (c. 1955–60), charcoal on paper, MoMA, object no. 418.1963
- Forget It (c. 1954), oil on canvas, recipient of Hallmark Art Award
- Knock Out (c. 1955–59), oil and glass on canvas, exhibited in Sixteen Americans; requested for acquisition by MoMA
- Only Now Counts (1955), oil and glass, featured in both Sixteen Americans and Art News plate reproduction
- Gift Bearers, reproduced in The Grand Eccentrics (1966), edited by Thomas Hess

== Legacy ==
Lewitin died in 1966 at age 73. In his obituary, critic Hilton Kramer noted the symbolic ambition of his work and his role within the intellectual art circles of New York. His widow, Alice Mizner Lewitin, was active in religious and cultural organizations and was honored by the French government for her contributions to Franco-American understanding.

His estate maintains an archive of paintings, collages, and notebooks, and a digitization project is underway.
