= Pat Passlof =

American abstract expressionist painter (1928–2011)

- Born: August 5, 1928; Brunswick, Georgia
- Died: November 13, 2011 (aged 83); New York, New York
- Known for: Painting
- Movement: Abstract Expressionism
- Spouse: Milton Resnick (1962–2004)

Pat Passlof (August 5, 1928 – November 3, 2011) was an American abstract expressionist painter.

== Biography ==
Passlof was born in Georgia in 1928 and grew up in New York City, where she attended Queens College, City University of New York. In the summer of 1948, she studied painting with Willem de Kooning at Black Mountain College and continued to study with him privately after they returned to New York. That fall, de Kooning introduced her to fellow painter Milton Resnick. She and Resnick began to live together in the mid-1950s and married in 1961.

Passlof was an integral member of the art scene in New York for six decades. Her life, career, and writing intersected with major touchstones: from "The Club" and the cooperatives on Tenth Street, to the famed Green Gallery, the feminist art movement, and generations of her students. Passlof's earliest work utilized the kinds of biomorphic forms explored by de Kooning and Gorky as well as the existentialist ideology that informed Abstract Expressionism. However, Passlof was always very individualistic and her work was constantly varied in terms of touch, form, and palette. She was never content to repeat herself. Her influences included her Chinese neighbors in lower Manhattan's Roosevelt Park, with whom she regularly practiced Tai Chi; a Roma family from whom she may have learned fortune-telling; and astrology.

In 1949, Passlof helped renovate the Eighth Street loft, which was the first location of "The (Artists') Club," attending every talk and panel. She considers this the basis of her art education, although she did complete her BFA at Cranbrook in 1951, before returning to her loft on Tenth Street. Noticing that many of her peers rarely spoke when they came to the club, she decided to organize an alternative "Wednesday Night Club," envisioning it as a kind of "junior club." The Wednesday evening sessions quickly became popular, leading the old guard to squelch it for fear of competition. In 1956, Passlof helped found the March Gallery, where she had two exhibitions and helped organize many shows of other artists, including Mark di Suvero's first exhibition. She designed a collection of artists' poetry called Pandemonium (1960).

In 1961 she had a solo exhibition at Dick Bellamy's Green Gallery, where she also participated in group shows. In the 1970s, Passlof became central to the organization “Women in the Arts,” reviewing panels and lectures for its magazine. She also wrote for Craft Horizons and occasionally contributed reviews to Arts Magazine.

In the 1960s and 1970s she exhibited with the Globe Gallery, the Feiner Gallery, and the Landmark Gallery.

She taught at Richmond College in Staten Island, New York from 1972 to 1983 and College of Staten Island from 1983 to 2010.

Passlof was the subject of a retrospective held at Black Mountain College Museum in 2011. Another retrospective of her work, curated by Karen Wilkin, was held at the Milton Resnick and Pat Passlof Foundation in 2020. Passlof's painting Untitled (c. 1950) was acquired by the Museum of Modern Art (MoMA), New York and included in its 2017 exhibition, "Making Space: Women Artists and Postwar Abstraction."

Passlof died of cancer on November 3, 2011, in New York City. She was 83. Her will stipulated that her (and her husband's) paintings and assets would be used to establish The Milton Resnick and Pat Passlof Foundation.

== Public Collections ==
- Black Mountain College Museum + Arts Center, Asheville, NC
- Corcoran Legacy Collection, Washington, D.C.
- Crystal Bridges Museum of American Art, Bentonville, AZ
- Maier Museum of Art, Lynchburg, VA
- Haggerty Museum of Art, Milwaukee, WI
- Milwaukee Art Museum, Milwaukee, WI
- Museum of Modern Art, New York, NY
- Roswell Museum, Roswell, NM
- Weatherspoon Art Gallery, Greensboro, NC
- The Whitney Museum, New York, NY

== Legacy ==
The Milton Resnick and Pat Passlof Foundation was established in 2015. In 2016 her biography was included in the exhibition catalogue Women of Abstract Expressionism organized by the Denver Art Museum. In 2021 she was the subject of an exhibition at Eric Firestone Gallery where her work is regularly exhibited. In 2023 her work was included in the exhibition Action, Gesture, Paint: Women Artists and Global Abstraction 1940-1970 at the Whitechapel Gallery in London.
