= Gabriel Laderman =

American painter (1929 - 2011)

- Born: December 26, 1929; Brooklyn, New York, US
- Died: March 10, 2011 (aged 81); Manhattan, New York, US
- Education: Brooklyn College, Hans Hofmann, Stanley William Hayter, Willem de Kooning, Alfred Russell
- Known for: Figurative art

Gabriel Laderman (December 26, 1929 – March 10, 2011) was a New York painter and an early and important exponent of the Figurative revival of the 1950s and 1960s.

He studied with a number of leading American painters, including Hans Hofmann, Willem de Kooning, and Mark Rothko.

== Biography ==
=== Education ===
In 1948 he began by doing the exercises in Paul Klee's Pedagogical Sketchbook, which at the time was available only in the original Bauhaus edition in German.

In the summer of 1949 he went to Provincetown and studied with Hans Hofmann. Since he already knew about abstract expressionist painting (Willem de Kooning had had his first show) he began painting in that tradition, informed with what Hofmann had taught about forming.

He met de Kooning that summer and began to show him his work in September of that year on a regular basis, while also attending Brooklyn College where he studied with Ad Reinhardt, Alfred Russell, Mark Rothko, Burgoyne Diller, Jimmy Ernst, Stanley William Hayter and Robert J. Wolff (the chairman of the department).

He also began to go to Hayter's Atelier 17, which he used as a shop for printing his engraved and etched plates.

About his Brooklyn College years, Laderman said:

"The school was a hot bed of abstract painting radicalism. One of the major buzzwords was for us to try to get "on the idea level." That meant having a pictorial idea which would generate work. It was clear that my teachers at Brooklyn and also both de Kooning and Hayter did not believe that they had to go through the motions of imitating recent radical art. They were going out on their own and inventing new art. All of them, though, believed that there were pictorial actions which guided art making and were required to validate the work. But those actions could be unheard of ones, or ideas imported from elsewhere and other forms. Russell had us not only drawing in the Natural History museum, but also highly touted the value of drawing parked cars, looking through the windows into the internal spaces, and those as seen in a second car through a first one. Reinhardt made a trip around the world and came back with slides of Islamic architecture, often severely symmetrical, but with Arabic calligraphy incised, which had no symmetry, since it was excerpted from the Koran. He also brought back slides of the interiors of Hindu and Buddhist temples that were so dark it was almost impossible to make out the figures. We understood his paintings, both because we could see their actions, and because he made his ideational sources clear through the images he showed in school and at his lectures. I also was one of the youngest members of the artist's club, which started while I was in college on the top floor of the building above Atelier 17. This was the abstract expressionist hangout, and it was where the members of the movement displayed their ideas and publicly disagreed with one another."

After graduating from Brooklyn, he spent a year as a graduate student in art history in the New York University Institute of Fine Arts. There, he studied Asian art and 14th century Italian art. Both traditions influenced his later work.

In 1955, after two years in the army, he went to Cornell University for his MFA, with an assistantship in painting. During his time there, he began to try to paint from nature with less distortion and invention.

=== Teaching ===
In 1957 he was appointed Instructor in art at SUNY, New Paltz. After two years at New Paltz he was offered a raise in rank, but chose to return to New York where he taught at Pratt Institute until 1967 when he began teaching at Queens College, CUNY.

From 1967 through 1996 he was artist in residence and lectured at many schools and museums, including Princeton University, Yale University, Bennington College, Philadelphia College of Art, Pennsylvania Academy, University of Pennsylvania, the Tyler School of Art, Moore College of Art, Boston University, The Boston Museum School, at the Museum of Fine Arts, Boston, Amherst College, Stanford University, Kansas City Art Institute, Art School of Surabaya, Art Center Jakarta, USIS centers in Japan in Tokyo, Nagoya, Sapporo and Fukuoka, Royal College of Art, Bangkok, Victorian College of Art, Melbourne; College Ballarat, Indiana University, Bloomington, Louisiana State University, Arizona State, American University, Skowhegan, Chautauqua, the Art Students League of New York, and the Yale-Norfolk School.

He retired from teaching in 1996 but continued to paint.

=== Paintings and exhibitions ===
His first exhibited painting, in 1949, was abstract expressionist, in the vein of de Kooning's work.

Starting with a show of engravings and intaglios at the Tanager Gallery in 1960 his work was painted from nature and always representational.

Starting in 1962, he exhibited with the Schoelkopf Gallery until the gallery was closed, due to the death of its proprietor.

Subsequently, he showed with Peter Tatistcheff.

His work, starting in the 1980s was usually of the figure including a number of major paintings with subject matter. The early subject matter paintings were all about crimes, and several were based on the Maigret series of detective novels by the Belgian author Georges Simenon, including the series "Murder and its Consequences", and his most famous painting "The House of Death and Life".

=== Death ===
Laderman died of heart failure at age 81, on March 10, 2011, in Manhattan.

== Selected museum exhibitions ==
- Whitney Museum of American Art
- Museum of Fine Arts, Boston
- Art Institute of Chicago
- Pennsylvania Academy of Fine Arts

== Awards and honors ==
- National Academy of Design — Altman Prize
- 1993 National Academy of Design — Thomas R. Proctor Prize
- 1992 Elected into the National Academy of Design
- 1990 Ingram-Merrill Award
- 1989 Rockefeller Foundation, Resident Artist at Bellagio
- 1988 Queens College Presidential Fellowship,
- 1988 Guggenheim Fellowship
- 1988 CUNY Research Foundation
- 1987 National Endowment for the Arts Senior Fellowship
- 1986 CUNY Research Award
- 1983 Ingram-Merrill Award
- 1982 National Endowment for the Arts Senior Fellowship, CUNY Research Award
- 1975 Dept. of the Interior — Bicentennial Landscape Commission, Ingram-Merrill Award
- 1973 CUNY Research Award
- 1962 Fulbright Award to Italy
- 1960 Yaddo Fellowship
- 1959 Yaddo Fellowship, Louis Comfort Tiffany Award

== Selected collections ==
- Andrew Dickson White Museum, Cornell University
- Archdiocese of Baton Rouge, Louisiana
- Brandeis University, Rose Art Museum
- Chicago Art Institute
- Chase Manhattan Bank
- Cleveland Museum of Art
- Davidson Collection
- Edmund P. Pillsbury
- Fidelity Bank, Philadelphia
- FMC Corporation, Chicago
- Malcolm Holtzman
- Glenn C. Janss Collection, Boise Art Museum
- Innes Collection, Charlottesville
- The Jalane and Richard Davidson Collection, Art Institute of Chicago
- Jane Livingston
- Mead Art Museum, Amherst, MA
- Montclair State College
- Museum of Fine Arts, Boston
- National Academy of Design, NYC
- National Gallery of Art, Washington, DC
- National Museum (Muzium Negara), Kuala Lumpur, Malaysia.
- National Museum of American Art, Smithsonian Institution, Washington, DC
- Robert Natkin
- Sierra Club
- Spurzem Collection
- Uris-Hilton Hotels
- Weatherspoon Gallery, NC
- William Bailey
