= Jon Schueler =

American painter (1916–1992)

- Jon Schueler, 1981 by Archie I. McLellan
- Born: September 12, 1916; Milwaukee, Wisconsin
- Died: August 5, 1992 (aged 75); New York City, New York
- Known for: Painting
- Movement: Abstract Expressionism, New York School
- Website: Jon Schueler Estate

Jon Schueler (September 12, 1916 – August 5, 1992) was an American painter known for his large-scale, abstract compositions which evoke nature. Recognized first as a second-generation Abstract Expressionist he lived in New York City and in Mallaig, Scotland, inspired by the dramatic skies over the Sound of Sleat. His work is included in international collections such as the Scottish National Gallery of Modern Art (Edinburgh), Whitney Museum of American Art (New York), and the National Gallery of Australia (Canberra).

In 1975 Whitney Museum of American Art director John I. H. Baur described Schueler's distinctive style: "We see his paintings one minute as clouds and sea and islands, the next as swirling arrangements of pure color and light. And they shift back and forth in our vision from one pole to the other, amassing richness from both." In 2006, at the time of solo exhibitions of his work in Edinburgh and New York, art reviewer Janet McKenzie wrote of "his remarkable commitment and development as a mature painter, abstract, yet inspired by natural phenomena." Schueler himself wrote: "When I speak of nature, I’m speaking of the sky, because in many ways the sky became nature to me. And when I think of the sky, I think of the Scottish sky over Mallaig."

== Life and career ==
Jon Schueler was born on September 12, 1916, in Milwaukee, Wisconsin. He attended the University of Wisconsin and graduated with a B.A. in Economics (1938) and a M.A. in English Literature (1940). He wrote briefly for the New Haven Evening Register before joining the US Army Air Corps in September 1941. As a B-17 navigator stationed in England, he flew missions over France and Germany. Hospitalized and then discharged from the Air Corps in 1944, Schueler moved to Los Angeles. In 1947 he taught English literature at the University of San Francisco and, increasingly interested in painting, enrolled under the G.I. Bill at the California School of Fine Arts (San Francisco Art Institute). From 1948-1951, he studied under such artists as Clyfford Still, Richard Diebenkorn, David Park, Hassel Smith, Edward Corbett, and met Mark Rothko. In 1951 he followed his friend and mentor Clyfford Still to New York City where he was introduced to Barnett Newman, Jackson Pollock, and Ad Reinhardt. Schueler's first solo exhibition was held at the Stable Gallery in 1954. A second solo show at the legendary Leo Castelli Gallery in 1957 drew favorable reviews in the New York Times and Life Magazine.

In September 1957, Schueler discovered the remote fishing village of Mallaig, Scotland. Inspired by the dramatic skies over the Sound of Sleat, he completed 45 paintings by March 1958 before traveling to Italy and France. In January 1959 Schueler returned to New York and exhibited at Leo Castelli Gallery and at the Stable Gallery in 1961 and 1963. During the 1960s he was an instructor at Yale University's Norfolk Summer School (1960, 1961), a visiting artist at both Yale University School of Art (1960-62) and the Maryland Institute (1963-67), and then Head of Graduate and Undergraduate Painting and Sculpture at the University of Illinois at Urbana-Champaign (1968-69). In 1970 he returned to Mallaig to live and periodically to accompany local fishermen out to sea. This experience brought into focus images of death, associated with the sea and sky, which had haunted him since the war. In 1971 he was interviewed by Films of Scotland for the film Jon Schueler: An Artist and His Vision (1972). He also developed friendships with poet Alastair Reid, artist Kenneth Dingwall, and art historian Magda Salvesen, who became "his muse and companion". In 1975 Schueler and Salvesen returned to New York for his solo exhibition at the Whitney Museum of American Art and joint exhibition with Mark Rothko and Milton Avery at the Cleveland Museum of Art. In 1976 he married Salvesen and remained in New York but continued to return to Mallaig to paint for three months each year. In 1981 Schueler painted in situ for six weeks during his solo exhibition The Search at Edinburgh University’s Talbot Rice Art Centre. Solo exhibitions of his work were also held in Edinburgh, Minneapolis, Kansas City, Chicago and, in New York, at the Katharina Rich Perlow Gallery in 1986, 1987, 1989, and 1991. On August 5, 1992, Schueler died in New York City.

Since his death, Schueler's work continues to be exhibited in public and private galleries in Scotland, Australia, and America. Schueler's memoir, edited by Magda Salvesen and Diane Cousineau, was published as The Sound of Sleat: A Painter’s Life by Picador USA in 1999. The monograph Jon Schueler: To the North with essays by Gerald Nordland and Richard Ingleby, was published by Merrell in 2002.

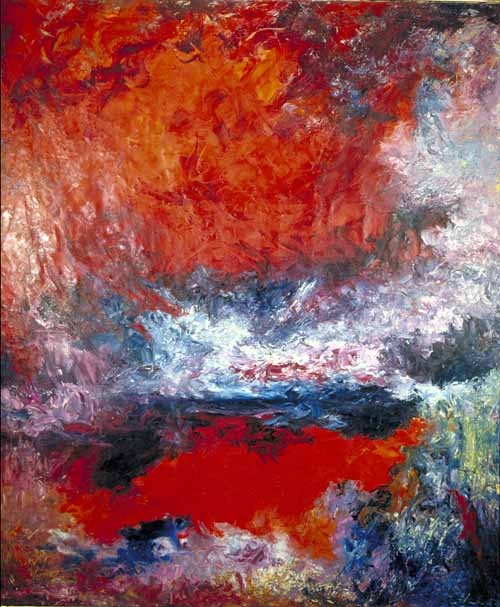
I Think of the Open Sea, 1958

== Style development ==
Schueler's early painting, exhibited at his 1954 Stable Gallery solo show, evoked nature's atmospheric and rhythmic force. By the time of Schueler's 1957 Leo Castelli Gallery exhibition, however "glimmers of fantasy sea and sky, storm and fog, sun and land," set his work apart from mainstream Abstract Expressionism. Like other artists searching "for the uniqueness of their souls on the canvas," Schueler traveled to Europe where he discovered his imagined landscapes in Mallaig, Scotland. Back in New York in 1959, his memories of Mallaig took on mystical significance as "dimly recognizable forms of real landscapes with glimpses of the horizon and receding distances." Writer B. H. Friedman recalled that his work, now painted with brushes rather than palette knives, "contained a luminosity and a glow of radiant light not found previously." In 1970 Schueler wrote that his painting "must be a search and a requiem" and his work began to reflect a "less tempestuous awareness of natural elements." Art reviewer Janet McKenzie noted the influence of J. M. W. Turner and a "more poetic and elemental meaning" in his work as his wartime memories receded. In 1975 Whitney Museum of American Art director John I. H. Baur praised Schueler's work: "They strike a more precarious balance between observation and abstract form than do most paintings that try to wed the two...." Schueler himself commented in 1984: "The abstract is real and the real is abstract." The palette in his later work varied from subtle and pale tones to vibrant, almost aggressive red, yellow, and black, which took on the fluidity or restlessness of ambient light. By the late 1980s, his paintings were rendered with increasingly loose brushstrokes, which at times recalled his early work.

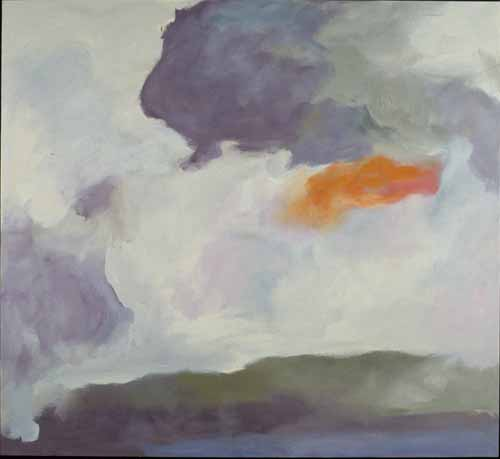
Grey Rain Over Silver Black, 1982

== Legacy ==
In 1999, Schueler's widow and curator of the Jon Schueler Estate, Magda Salvesen, oversaw the publication of his memoirs, The Sound of Sleat: A Painter's Life (Picador USA). Compiled by Salvesen and Diane Cousineau from his diaries and correspondence, the book was described in The Atlantic Monthly as follows: "It may be the best thing ever written about the workings of a painter's mind and eye." That year the DVD Jon Schueler: A Life in Painting, with excerpts from the 1972 Films of Scotland production, was also released. In 2012 Sabhal Mòr Ostaig, University of the Highlands and Islands established the Jon Schueler Visual Artist in Residence Scholarship. Each year the college hosts an artist for three months selected from some 1,400 international applications. In May 2016 Sabhal Mòr Ostaig presented the Jon Schueler Centenary Symposium An Linne: The Sound of Sleat: Echoes, Reflections, and Transfigurations and accompanying exhibition. Organized by Schueler scholar Lindsay Blair, the three-day symposium also featured speakers art historians Mary Ann Caw, and Duncan Macmillan, who curated Schueler's 1981 Talbot Rice Art Centre exhibition, as well as gallerist Richard Demarco, artist Kenneth Dingwall, and fisherman-artist Will Maclean. In 2025, the film Woman in the Sky, directed by Max Woertendyke was released, focused on Schueler's legacy and Salvesen's preservation of it.

== Collections ==
His work is in many public collections including the Scottish National Gallery of Modern Art (Edinburgh), Gallery of Modern Art (Glasgow), Aberdeen Art Gallery, Inverness Museum and Art Gallery, City Art Centre (Edinburgh), The McManus Galleries Art Gallery and Museum (Dundee), Mallaig Heritage Centre, Paisley Museum and Art Galleries, and at the National Gallery of Australia (Canberra). In the United States his work is in the Whitney Museum of American Art (New York), Addison Gallery of American Art (Andover MA), Cleveland Museum of Art, Baltimore Museum of Art, San Francisco Museum of Modern Art, Berkeley Art Museum, Crocker Art Museum (Sacramento CA), Detroit Institute of Arts, Minneapolis Institute of Arts, Frederick R. Weisman Art Museum (Minneapolis MN), Harwood Museum of Art (Taos NM), National Academy Museum and School (New York), and Ringling Museum of Art (Sarasota FL). His work is also included in the art collections of the University of Edinburgh and University of Stirling in Scotland, and in Yale University (New Haven CT), Union College (Schenectady NY), University of Wyoming (Laramie WY), Neuberger Museum of Art, State University of New York (Purchase NY), and Colby College Museum of Art (Waterville ME) in the United States.
