= John Ferren =

American artist and educator (1905 – 1970)

- Born: John Millard Ferren; October 17, 1905; Pendleton, Oregon, US
- Died: July 1, 1970 (aged 64); Southampton, New York, US
- Known for: Oil painting
- Movement: Abstract Expressionism
- Spouse(s): Laure Lourié (m. 1932; div. 1938) Inez Chatfield (m. 1941; div. 1948) Rae Tonkel (m. 1948)
- Children: Bran Ferren

John Millard Ferren (October 17, 1905 – July 1, 1970) was an American artist and educator. He was active from 1920 until 1970 in San Francisco, Paris and New York City.

== Early life ==
John Ferren was born in Pendleton, Oregon on October 17, 1905, on the Blackfoot Indian Reservation. His parents were Verna Zay (née Westfall) and James William Ferren, his father served in the Army and the family moved often. In 1911, the family settled down in San Francisco, California.

In 1925, he briefly attended the California School of Fine Arts (now known as San Francisco Art Institute). In his 20s, he apprenticed as a stonecutter in San Francisco and produced portrait busts.

== Career ==
=== Paris ===
In 1929, he traveled to New York City and Paris. While in Paris, Ferren attended classes at the Sorbonne, Académie de la Grande Chaumière, and Académie Ranson. Although for the most part not formally educated, preferring to develop his art through an adventurous life style, and interaction with other artists, he was known as an intellectual among his peers. He wrote many published articles on abstract art and art theory. His writing and artwork appears in three issues of the influential magazine; It is. A Magazine for Abstract Art (1958-1965). While in Paris, Ferren was part of the community of artists working in Europe in the 1920s and 30s, including Marcel Duchamp, Max Ernst, Hans Hofmann, Joaquín Torres-García, Alberto Giacometti, Henri Matisse, Joan Miró, Piet Mondrian, and Pablo Picasso. He became friendly with Picasso, who mentored him, and together they stretched the canvas for Picasso's large 1937 painting Guernica.

He briefly returned to the United States in 1930, returning to Paris soon after, where he remained until 1938. He was liked to the group Abstraction-Création. He was the only artist who was both an inner-circle member of the Parisian avant garde of the 1930s, and the New York School abstract expressionists of the 1940s and 1950s. Gertrude Stein, remarked of Ferren in her 1937 book Everybody's Autobiography: "He is the only American painter foreign painters in Paris consider a painter and whose painting interests them.

He worked at Atelier 17 with Stanley William Hayter, and learned about a nineteenth-century printing technique where the engraving plate is imprinted in wet plaster, and when dried, is then carved and painted.

=== New York ===
In 1938, he moved to New York City. He was a founding member (and later president) of The Club, a group of artists who were at the heart of the emerging New York School of abstract expressionism. He befriended Yun Gee, and through Gee, he became interested Taoism and Zen Buddhism.

He taught at the Brooklyn Museum Art School, starting in 1946. Additionally he taught at Cooper Union (1946), Queens College (1952–1970), ArtCenter College of Design, Pasadena, California, and the University of California, Los Angeles. During this time, he lived in a home and summer studio he designed and built in Brentwood, California.

In the 1950s, Ferren collaborated with Alfred Hitchcock. In the 1955 film The Trouble With Harry, the artworks of main character Sam Marlowe were painted by Ferren. In the 1958 film Vertigo, Ferren created the Jimmy Stewart nightmare sequence as well as the haunting, Portrait of Carlotta.

=== Beirut ===
Ferren was selected as the first US State Department's Artist in Residence, and spent one year ('63–'64) in Beirut, Lebanon with his family. They lived on the second floor of the famous Beirut landmark building The Pink House (sometimes Rose House) which also served as his studio. While in the Middle East he had several exhibitions, including at the American University of Beirut, and traveled throughout the region giving lectures on his work and on American Abstract Expressionism. His presence there was captured in an art project by painter Tom Young, in 2014–2015.

=== East Hampton ===
Ferren, along with friend and fellow painter Willem de Kooning, purchased adjacent land and a house, to which he added a studio, from sculptor Wilfrid Zogbaum in 1959. A few years after returning from Beirut, the Ferrens moved from New York City to live and paint full-time in East Hampton, however he also maintained a studio in New York at 147 Spring Street (sharing the building with Robert Wilson's Byrd Hoffman School of Byrds), as he was simultaneously a professor teaching color and painting, and serving as chairman of the art department for CUNY, Queens College. This was a very prolific period for them both, and the Ferren's remained active members of the East Hampton artist community, for the remainder of their lives. Both of their works can be seen as prominent parts of the Guild Hall Museum permanent collection[37], and on exhibit at the Smithsonian American Art Museum permanent collection, along with their son's Bran Ferren.

== Personal life ==
His first marriage was in 1932 to Laure Lourié (née Ortíz de Zarate), a French costume designer, which ended in divorce by 1938. His second marriage was in 1941, to Inez Ferren (née Chatfield), and ended in divorce by 1948.

While teaching at Brooklyn Museum Art School, he met Rae Tonkel, one of his students and an Impressionist painter. Ferren married Rae Ferren (née Tonkel) in 1949, when she was age 20 and he was age 44. Rae Ferren died on September 6, 2016. Their son, Bran Ferren, is a designer, technologist, inventor, and businessman.

== Death ==
Ferren died of cancer at the Southampton Hospital in Southampton, New York in 1970. He is buried at Green River Cemetery in East Hampton, New York.

== Museum permanent collections ==
His work is in various public museum collections including:

- Smithsonian American Art Museum, Washington DC
- Solomon R. Guggenheim Museum, New York City, New York
- The Museum of Modern Art, New York City, New York
- The Los Angeles County Museum of Art, Los Angeles, California
- The Whitney Museum of American Art, New York City, New York
- Peggy Guggenheim Collection in Venice, Italy
- The San Francisco Museum of Modern Art, San Francisco, California
- The High Museum of Art, Atlanta, Georgia
- The Detroit Institute of Arts, Detroit, Michigan
- Oklahoma City Museum of Art, Oklahoma City, Oklahoma
- Sheldon Museum of Art, Lincoln, Nebraska
- Indianapolis Museum of Art, Indianapolis, Indiana
- The Newberry Library, Chicago, Illinois
- Guild Hall of East Hampton, East Hampton, New York
- The Hirschhorn Museum & Sculpture Garden
- Pennsylvania Academy of Fine Arts, Philadelphia, Pennsylvania
- The Phillips Collection, Washington DC
- Blanton Museum of Art, Austin, Texas
- Davidson Art Center, Wesleyan University, Middletown, Connecticut
- Parrish Art Museum, Water Mill, New York
- Amon Carter Museum of American Art, Fort Worth, Texas
- John Raimondi Collection
- Newark Art Museum, Newark, New Jersey
- Neuberger Museum of Art, Purchase, New York
- The National Gallery of Art
- The Fine Arts Museum of San Francisco, San Francisco, California
- Weatherspoon Art Museum
- Albright-Knox Art Gallery, Buffalo, New York
- US Embassy, Paris, France
- Santa Barbara Museum of Art
- Islip Art Museum, Islip, New York
- Lowe Art Museum, Miami, Florida
- Yale University Art Gallery, New Haven, Connecticut

== Exhibitions ==
A list of select exhibitions by John Ferren.

- 1923-1930 – San Francisco Art Association, San Francisco, California
- 1932 – Los Angeles Art Association, San Francisco, California
- 1932 – Galerie Zak, Paris, France
- 1936 – Galerie Pierre, Paris, France
- 1936 – San Francisco Museum of Modern Art, San Francisco, California
- 1936 – Minneapolis Institute of Art, Minneapolis, Minnesota
- 1936–1938 – Pierre Matisse Gallery, New York City, New York
- 1937 – Arts Club of Chicago, Chicago Illinois
- 1939 – Pennsylvania Academy of Fine Arts, Pennsylvania
- 1940 – Pierre Loeb Galerie, Paris, France (3 shows)
- 1940 – The Corcoran Gallery, Washington, D.C.
- 1941 – Corcoran Gallery, Washington D.C.
- 1942 – Peggy Guggenheim's Art of This Century Gallery, New York City, New York
- 1946 – Detroit Institute of Art, Maryland
- 1947 – Art Institute of Chicago, Illinois
- 1947–1949 – Kleeman Gallery, New York City, New York
- 1950 – Museum of New Mexico, New Mexico
- 1951 – 9th Street Art Exhibition, New York City, New York
- 1951 – Whitney Museum of American Art, New York City, New York
- 1952 – Santa Barbara Museum of Art, Santa Barbara, California
- 1953 – Iolas Gallery, New York
- 1954–1958 – The Stable Gallery, New York City, New York (5 shows)
- 1955 – Norton Simon Museum, Pasadena, California
- 1955 – Whitney Museum of American Art, New York City, New York
- 1956 – Whitney Museum of American Art, New York City, New York
- 1956 – The Stable Gallery, New York
- 1957 – Arts Club of Chicago, Chicago Illinois
- 1957 – The Stable Gallery, New York
- 1958 – Provincetown Art Festival, Massachusetts
- 1961 – Abstract Expressionists and Imagists, Guggenheim Museum, New York City, New York
- 1964 – Post-painterly abstraction, Los Angeles County Museum of Art (LACMA), Los Angeles, California
- 1964-1966 – Pennsylvania Academy of Fine Arts, Pennsylvania
- 1965 – Post-painterly abstraction, Walker Art Center
- 1965 – Whitney Museum of American Art, New York City, New York
- 1965 – American Embassy Gallery, London
- 1967 – Allentown Art Museum, Allentown, Pennsylvania
- 1968 – Kornblee Gallery, New York City, New York
- 1969–1985 – A.M. Sachs Gallery, New York City, New York (11 solo shows)
- 1962–1969 – Roses Fried Gallery, New York City, New York (7 shows)
- 1979 – Graduate Center, City University of New York, New York City, New York
- 1985–2007 – Katharina Rich Perlow Gallery, New York City, New York (15 shows)
- 1986 – Hofstra University Museum of Art, Hempstead, New York
- 1993 – Parish Art Museum, Southampton, New York
- 1993 – State University of New York, Stonybrook, New York
- 1993 – Pollak-Krasner Study House, East Hampton, New York
- 1993 – Dallas Museum of Art, Dallas, Texas
- 1996 – Los Angeles County Museum of Art (LACMA), Los Angeles, California
- 1998 – Rose Fried Gallery, New York City, New York
- 1998 – Michael Rosenfeld Gallery, New York City, New York
- 2008 – Hollis Taggart Gallery, New York City, New York
- 2009 – Spanierman Modern Gallery, New York City, New York
- 2010-2011 – Museum of Modern Art, New York, NY
- 2013 – The Baker Museum, Naples, Florida
- 2015 – David Findlay Jr. Gallery, New York, New York
- 2017 – Eric Firestone Gallery, East Hampton, New York
- 2017 – Peyton Wright Gallery, Santa Fe, New Mexico
- 2021 – David Findlay Jr. Gallery, New York, New York
