= Ellen Murray =

American painter (1947–2025)

Ellen Murray (1947 – October 4, 2025) is an American watercolorist. Her name is sometimes given as Ellen Murray Meissinger.

Born in Raleigh, North Carolina, Murray studied at the University of North Carolina at Greensboro, receiving her bachelor of fine arts in 1969 and a Masters of Fine Arts in 1971. Peter Agostini was among her instructors. She began exhibiting her work in her home state while in graduate school, and has since shown pieces around the United States. She has received numerous awards, and is a member of the National Watercolor Society and the Watercolor USA Honor Society. She taught at Oklahoma State University beginning in 1971; in 1986 she took a position at Arizona State University, where she oversees one of the largest programs in the country dedicated to watercolor and other water-based media. She has collaborated with the ASU Library Map and Geospatial Hub to facilitate the student exhibition series, Creative Cartography. Murray married Lonnie Dean Meissinger in 1975, and the couple's son, Logan Don, was born in 1979; his toys have often served as subjects for his mother's work. She has also created larger-scale installation pieces, such as Deluge, memorializing the 1966 flood of the Arno.
