= Philip Pavia =

American artist

- Born: March 16, 1911; Bridgeport, Connecticut, US
- Died: April 13, 2005 (aged 94); New York City, US
- Education: Yale, Art Students League, Accademia delle Belle Arti
- Occupations: Sculptor. Founder of The Club (fine arts); Founder, editor and publisher of It is. A Magazine for Abstract Art
- Known for: Scatter sculpture
- Movement: Abstract expressionism
- Spouse: Natalie Edgar
- Children: Luigi (b. 1968; d. 2012), Paul (b. 1971)

Philip Pavia (1911-2005) was a culturally influential American artist of Italian descent, known for his scatter sculpture and figurative abstractions, and the debate he fostered among many of the 20th century's most important art thinkers. A founder of the New York School of Abstract Expressionism, he "did much to shift the epicenter of Modernism from Paris to New York," both as founding organizer of The Club and as founder, editor and publisher of the short-lived but influential art journal It Is: A Magazine for Abstract Art. Reference to the magazine appears in the archives of more than two dozen celebrated art figures, including Picasso, Peggy Guggenheim, and art critic Clement Greenberg. The Club is credited with inspiring art critic Harold Rosenberg’s influential essay “The American Action Painters" and the historic 9th Street Show.

== Sculpture ==
Pavia's spent two years studying architecture at Yale, before transferring to the Art Students League of New York in 1931 where he met life-long friend, fellow abstract expressionist Jackson Pollock. For the next few years, Pavia alternated between art studies in New York and traveling studies in Europe. In 1937, he finally settled in New York City permanently. Soon after, he was hired as WPA Federal Art Project artist, which he later described as an invaluable training ground for himself and for friends and contemporaries like Willem de Kooning, Landes Lewitin, Franz Kline, Jack Tworkov. The experience solidified their discipline and their dialogue, while also giving them ready access to others with a daily practice of making, and therefore thinking about, art.

By 1946, Pavia had started to show professionally, but he was, according to the Times, "something of a loner in his work, and arguably more of an original than some of his better-known contemporaries." As a result, Pavia's first major show was in the 1960s, and featured "tumbling blocks of coloured stone that echoed the effects de Kooning had achieved in his paintings, and which are perhaps," the Times underscored, "underrated for their originality."

In a 1971 article for the New York Times, Pavia explained his work this way:

I like to get light to come out of the stone — that's the beauty of it.... I try to carve so as to convey the feel of the light simmering up along the piece and down.... Color and light make the marble real, otherwise it looks just like a balustrade. When I'm finished, the three pieces should go around like a carousel, like one big shaft.

Best known for his large-scale abstract assemblages, Pavia also created figurative pieces. His most monumental work been installed on the grounds of several major public sites. In 1971, he was one of four chosen to help sculpt 10 pieces for New York City's first Sculpture Symposium at the Cooper Hewitt Museum of Design. In 1973, he showed a six-foot-tall bronze head of President Kennedy at the Metropolitan Museum of Art. Other major installations included the 10-foot-high marble abstraction Wind, Sand and Stars, installed at New York's Cloisters Museum, and the Ides of March, which stood on Sixth Avenue, outside of the New York Hilton, for nearly 25 years. The Times described the latter piece as "four large, rough-hewn diamond shapes whose edges appeared to follow the viewer wherever he walked." Pavia's marble scatter sculpture "East Pediment, Sun-up" was exhibited at the National Gallery of Art in Washington, D.C. in 1966, before traveling to the San Francisco Museum of Modern Art, the Solomon R. Guggenheim Museum and its permanent home at the UB Art Galleries in Buffalo, New York in 2020.

Pavia also created large-scale abstract figuration, including "imaginary portraits of many members of The Club" in 1982. John Russell, writing for the New York Times, describes them as "... remarkably ''like,'' without being merely descriptive, and when the light falls on their polished surfaces, the sitters really look like people who are growing old in the service of art." In Pavia's final show, in 2005, he exhibited "12 colossal terracotta heads, executed in a menacingly primitive style [that] drew comparisons with the work of Giacometti."

== The Club ==
Called an "outspoken avant-garde thinker" by the Boston Globe, Pavia founded The Club in 1948, envisioning regular debate among artists, writers and thinkers about issues in art during twice-weekly lectures, members-only panel conversations and other events. Established shortly after the war, The Club was, in part, a response by American artists intimidated by the modernists who had taken refuge in New York after the war: "[T]here were geniuses walking in the streets, you know. About 30 of them," Pavia told the New York Times in 2002. "They included Piet Mondrian, Max Ernst, Josef Albers, Marcel Breuer, Yves Tanguy, André Breton and Marcel Duchamp. Matisse came for a visit and everybody lined up to see him.... Eventually, the refugees moved uptown, and the Americans decided to take them on."

The first half of the century belonged to Paris. The next half century will be ours!

— Phillip Pavia ^{5}

"''The Club'' was a schoolhouse of sorts," writes Devin M. Brown, reviewing Pavia's Club archives, "but it was also a theater, a gallery space, and a dancehall.... [T]he collection demonstrates how various media constantly overlapped whether simply through discussion or in performance. Concerts, dances, and theatrical pieces were all hosted there. Poets, composers, painters, sculptors, filmmakers, and critics all rubbed elbows and argued with each other about aesthetics at The Club’s many panel discussions...." Over time, Pollock rejected surrealism and Jungian imagery, then de Kooning followed suit. After a series of Club lectures on expressionism and abstraction, ideas from both started to merge, and America's first major home-grown abstract art movement was on its way.

"There was just blood on the floor every night," Pavia said once, describing the art fights that would result from panel debates. Debate topics spanned both art and philosophy, and frequently included "non-members like Hannah Arendt, Joseph Campbell and John Cage," while bringing together abstractionists and expressionists, which helped lend currency to the term "abstract-expressionism." Artists like Elaine de Kooning, Willem de Kooning, Barnett Newman, Robert Motherwell, Landes Lewitin, Aristodimos Kaldis, and Leo Castelli would attend meetings too. Devin M. Brown also cites Club Without Walls: Selections from the Journals of Philip Pavia, when recalling Pavia's observation, “If it wasn’t for our persistent gatherings, I am sure we would have all become loners and faded away.”

== It is. A Magazine for Abstract Art ==
In 1956, Pavia resigned from The Club and, in the spring of 1958, published the first edition of the short-lived but influential art journal It is. A Magazine for Abstract Art, as another way to exchange ideas in the Arts. The magazine was used as a forum to discuss ideas of the day, and to champion both emerging artists, such as Allan Kaprow, Robert Rauschenberg, Helen Frankenthaler, and John Chamberlain and already established ones.

As a self-described "partisan publisher," Pavia also used it as a platform to advocate for neglected forms of art. For example, in 1959, in an open letter to Leslie Katz, the new publisher of Arts Magazine, he wrote:

I am begging you to give the representational artist a better deal. The neglected representational and near-abstract artists, not the abstractionists, need a champion these days.

Numerous high-profile artists supported the project, including Elaine de Kooning who spread word of the publication while serving as a judge on an art show and with local museums in New Mexico. Brooklyn Rail critic Phong Bui described the magazine's influence this way: "Although there were only six issues in its entirety — with a circulation of 2,000 in the first five and 8,000 copies in the last, which was solely devoted to sculpture — It is is considered to be an indispensable document of American art of that period."

== Interviews ==
- Bui, Phong. "The Club IT IS: A Conversation with Philip Pavia." Feb-March 2001: The Brooklyn Rail.
- De Antonio, Emile. "Painters Painting" (1973, 116 min).
- Hooten, Bruce. "Oral history interview with Philip Pavia, 1965 Jan. 19." Archives of American Art.
- Potter, Jeffrey. "Meet Your Neighbor." Springs, NY, 1989. LTV Public Access Archives, East Hampton, New York. (1989, 29 min).
- Tatge, Catherine. "Robert Motherwell & The New York School: Storming the Citadel." (1991, 55 min).

== Public Collections ==
- Albright-Knox Art Gallery
- Hofstra University Museum Outdoor Sculpture Collection
- National Academy of Design, The
- Metropolitan Museum of Art
- Museo dei Bozzetti (Pietrasanta, Italy)
- Museo della Scultura Contemporanea Matera (MUSMA, Italy )
- Renwick Gallery at the Smithsonian American Art Museum.
- Whitney Museum of American Art

== Awards and honors ==
- Honorary doctorate, Pennsylvania Academy of Painting and Sculpture, 1995
- Selected as one of the Artists of the Millennium for an exhibition at the United Nations, 1999
- Pollack-Krasner Foundation Grant, 2000
- Artists Equity Honoree, 2002
- Guggenheim Award for Sculpture, 2004

== Personal life ==
Pavia was married to the painter, art critic and writer Natalie Edgar. The couple had two sons: His elder son Luigi died in 2012. His younger son Paul is also a sculptor.
