= The Club (fine arts) =

- The 8th Street Club
- Abbreviation: The Club
- Named after: The NYC location of its meetings
- Predecessor: Inspired by French salons and the camaraderie and cross-influences of artists who had participated in the Federal Art Project
- Successor: The 23rd Street Workshop Club
- Formation: 1949
- Founder: Philip Pavia
- Founded at: New York City
- Dissolved: ca. 1970
- Type: Arts, culture and humanities club
- Purpose: To provide an organized contemporary fine arts forum for discussion, debate, lecture and performance
- Members: Mainly painters and sculptors, but also dancers, poets, musicians and writers, including art critics, art historians and other kinds of cultural thinkers

The Club (1949–1957 and 1959–1970) has been called "a schoolhouse of sorts ... as well as a theater, gallery space, and a dancehall...." Created by abstract expressionist sculptor Philip Pavia, The Club grew out of the informal gatherings among dozens of painters and sculptors who all had art studios in Lower Manhattan between 8th and 12th streets and First and Sixth Avenues during the late 1940s and early 1950s. Membership included many of New York's most important mid-century artists and thinkers, predominantly painters and sculptors like Willem de Kooning, Franz Kline, Peter Agostini, Isamu Noguchi, John Ferren, and Robert Motherwell, as well as nearly all the artists later called the New York School. But other celebrated artists, cultural figures and major 20th-century thinkers attended meetings, including philosopher Joseph Campbell, composer John Cage and political theorist Hannah Arendt. Structured to facilitate the growth and dissemination of ideas about art by artists for artists, especially abstract expressionist art, The Club lent New York's art scene the vitality and international influence Paris had long monopolized, and U.S. artists had long craved.

== Debating art ==
Called an "outspoken avant-garde thinker" by The Boston Globe, Pavia decided to organize regular gatherings of artists, writers and thinkers to socialize and discuss modern art in 1948. The result, inspired by the salons of Paris, the ethnic groups that then proliferated in Greenwich Village and a post-war desire for art that wasn't borrowed from Europe, was the 8th Street Club, known as "the Club," and its 1959–1970 successor group, also known as the "23rd Street Workshop Club." In 1958, Pavia extended the Club's work into a journal, with the short-lived but influential It is. A Magazine for Abstract Art.

Originally envisioned as a regular debate about issues in art during twice-weekly lectures, members-only panel conversations and other events, as the Club was also, in part, a response to American artists intimidated by the modernists who had taken refuge in New York after the war.

"[T]here were geniuses walking in the streets, you know. About 30 of them," Pavia told The New York Times in 2002. "They included Piet Mondrian, Max Ernst, Josef Albers, Marcel Breuer, Yves Tanguy, André Breton and Marcel Duchamp. Matisse came for a visit and everybody lined up to see him.... Eventually, [Pavia] says, the refugees moved uptown, and the Americans decided to take them on." First Pollock rejected surrealism and Jungian imagery, then de Kooning followed suit. After a series of Club lectures on expressionism and abstraction, ideas from both started to merge, and America's first major home-grown abstract art movement was on its way. Carolyn Kinder Carr, the Deputy Director of the National Gallery, explains the process this way:

Those associated with Abstract Expressionism were linked by their rejection of both social realism and geometric abstraction, two dominant strains in American art in the 1930s, and by their interest in aspects of European-based Cubism and Surrealism. For them, art was no longer about copying forms in nature but was the expression of intangible ideas and experiences. For some artists, such as Jackson Pollock, Willem de Kooning, and Franz Kline, the subject of art was autobiographical and emerged from the sheer act of making a painting. For others, among them Barnett Newman and Clyfford Still, the motivation was a search for the sublime. Yet for all, as Mark Rothko eloquently postulated, "art was not about an experience, but was itself the experience."

The New Yorker's Louis Menand makes another point entirely when he writes about the sheer quantity of "formal experimentation and theoretical ferment there was in New York art between 1952 (the year by which the Abstract Expressionists had established themselves) and 1965.... You can see these downtown artists attempting solve a problem inherent in the term 'Abstract Expressionism' itself", which he points out is an "oxymoron: if something is abstract, it can't express," which explains why "there arose a push-pull between abstract forms and figuration (the same thing was happening in Europe) that yielded a rich variety of original work."

== History ==
"The Club was a schoolhouse of sorts," writes Devin M. Brown, for Burnaway the online Atlanta-based arts magazine, after reviewing Pavia's Archive of Abstract and Expressionist Art at (MARBL), the Manuscript, Archives, and Rare Book Library at Emory University, which owns the collection, "but it was also a theater, a gallery space, and a dancehall.... [T]he collection demonstrates how various media constantly overlapped whether simply through discussion or in performance. Concerts, dances, and theatrical pieces were all hosted there. Poets, composers, painters, sculptors, filmmakers, and critics all rubbed elbows and argued with each other about aesthetics at the Club's many panel discussions...."

If it wasn't for our persistent gatherings, I am sure we would have all become loners and faded away.

— Phillip Pavia, "Club Without Walls: Selections from the Journals of Philip Pavia"

"Debates at the Club covered a variety of art- and philosophy-related topics, bringing in non-members like Hannah Arendt, Joseph Campbell and John Cage, among others," and bringing together Abstractionists and Expressionists, which helped lend currency to the term "Abstract-Expressionism." Art members included Elaine de Kooning, Willem de Kooning, Barnett Newman, Robert Motherwell, Landes Lewitin, Aristodimos Kaldis, and Leo Castelli. Brown cites Club Without Walls: Selections from the Journals of Philip Pavia, when recalling Pavia's observation, "If it wasn't for our persistent gatherings, I am sure we would have all become loners and faded away."

"The Club eventually organized formal Friday night lectures and panels featuring artists and thinkers who were invited by members and paid with a bottle of liquor, if they were paid at all," Louisa Winchell writes. "Those invited included philosopher Hannah Arendt, literary scholar Joseph Campbell, mathematical historian Jean Louis van Heijenoort, and composers Virgil Thomson and Morty Feldman.... The Club also hosted frequent rap-sessions and parties after exhibition openings. [Author Mary] Gabriel emphasizes the abundance of dancing that took place at the Club, quoting Philip Pavia: "Franz [Klein] and Joan [Mitchell] would dance 'until they rolled on the floor dancing horizontally.'" Morgan Falconer, writing for the blog at the Royal Academy of Arts, echos Winchell's description — and Pavia's emphasis on dancing: "By day the artists would work, by night they would frequent "The Club", their private talking-shop, or dance in someone's studio – the tango, the jitterbug, even the kazatsky, the Russian folk dance beloved by Communists and Russophiles in the 1930s."

"The 1950s were critical years for many of the artists involved, and the Club offered a grounding site which bolstered their connections to one another, their confidence, and their status in the broader society." Winchell continues. "However, by the time the Abstract Expressionist movement had become the heart of the New York art world and put New York at the center of the international art community, the organization itself was no longer sustainable.... By varying accounts, the Club ceased to exist by the late 1950s or early 1960s ... although it was a significant part of this pivotal time in New York and America's history."

== Community ==
Once informally known as the Downtown Group, many of the Club's artists were former Federal Art Project artists, including Philip Pavia, Bill de Kooning, Landes Lewitin, Franz Kline and Jack Tworkov. Several had also served in the military during World War II, and many of them had been "gathering in the Village since the late 1930s, and later at the Waldorf Cafeteria at the corner of Sixth Avenue and West 8th Street," until they found themselves unwelcome there and, like the many ethnic clubs that proliferated during that period, they sought a space of their own. This larger group included Conrad Marca-Relli, Franz Kline, Joop Sanders, Milton Resnick, Giorgio Cavallon, Ibram Lassaw, Lutz Sanders, James Brooks, Lewin Alcopley, Frederick Kiesler, John Ferren (who served as President in 1955)), and James Rosati." Helmed by Philip Pavia, they rented and repaired a loft at 39 East 8th Street, which was conveniently located at the center of the arts community near Cedar Tavern.

The Club officially opened in October of 1949. To celebrate the first idyllic months, the members organized a Christmas party for their families. In preparation, they covered the walls and ceilings with large collages, which they left in place for New Year's. The party that carried the Club into the new decade lasted three days. "This is the beginning of the next half century," Pavia declared. There was a sense of optimism, community, and artistic and intellectual revelry propelling the Club forward from the onset.

Club members eventually included all, or nearly all, of the New York School, as well as the painters and sculptors — so-called Irascibles — who boycotted an upcoming "monster exhibition" at the Metropolitan Museum of Art's because of the jury's rejection of "advanced art," which led to a group photo of the artists for Life Magazine by photographer Nina Leen. As abstract expressionism developed, Club membership also extended to numerous forms of it, including action painting, color field, lyrical abstraction, tachisme, color field, Nuagisme and so on. Lectures by luminaries like Joseph Campbell, John Cage and Hannah Arendt, and bi-weekly discussions nurtured artists' theories about art, culture and the artist's role in it. Dislike of French Surrealist influence and challenges to the validity of formalist arguments were common, but weekly discussions at the Club also led to the idea of organizing the 9th Street Art Exhibition as a launching pad.

=== Painters and sculptors ===
(Selection was limited by availability.)

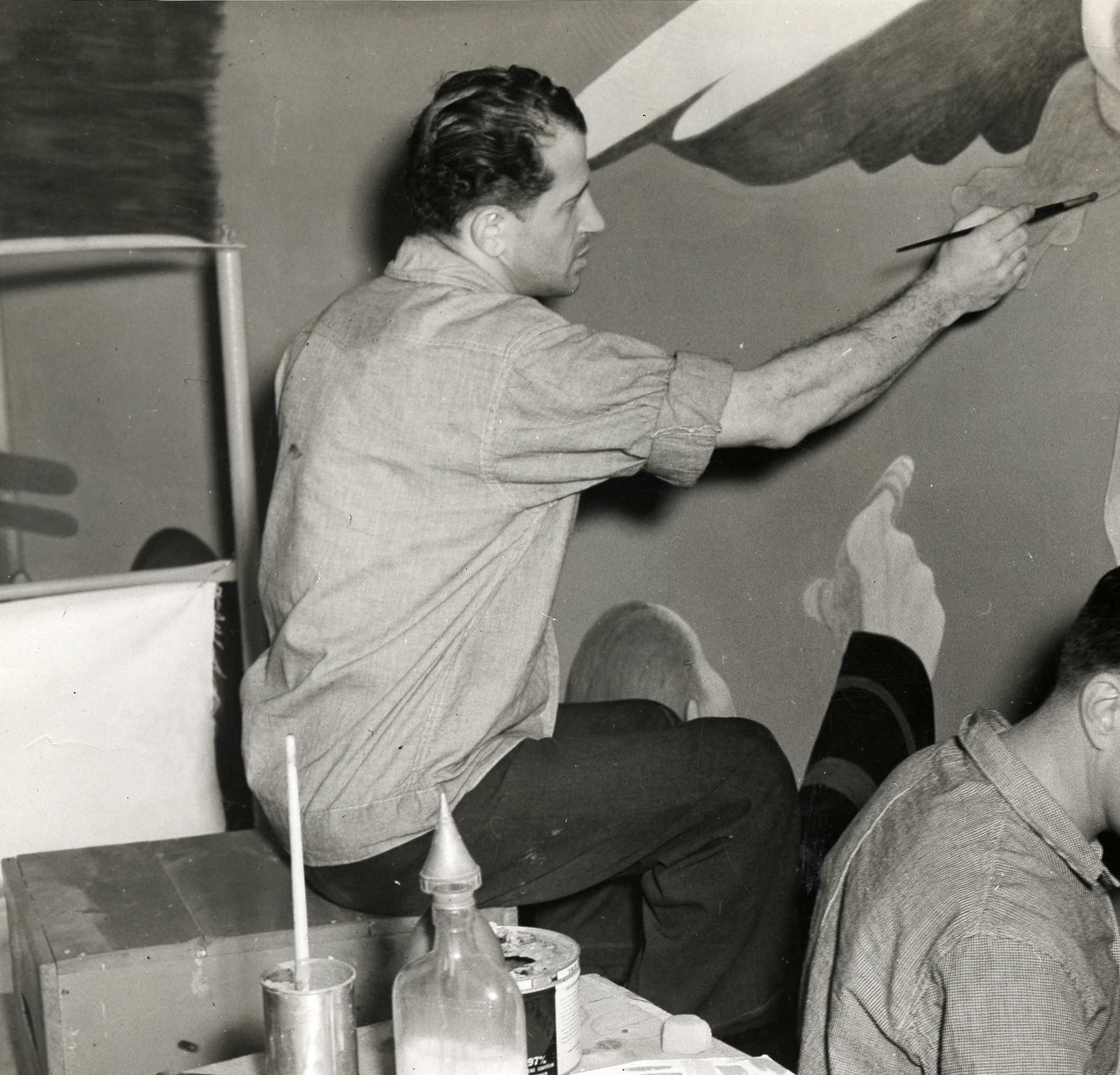
Painter James Brooks in 1940

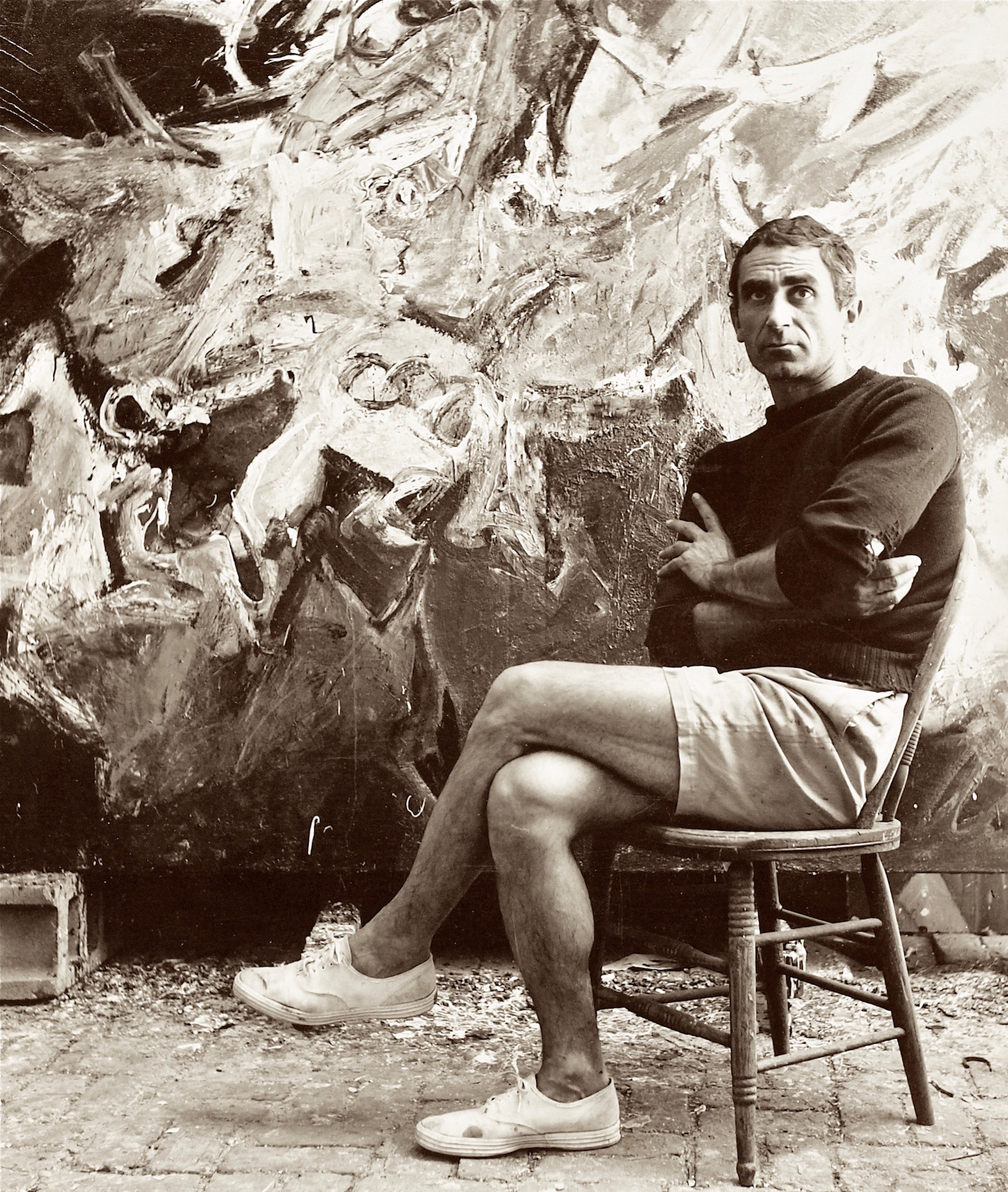
Painter Nicolas Carone in the late 1950s

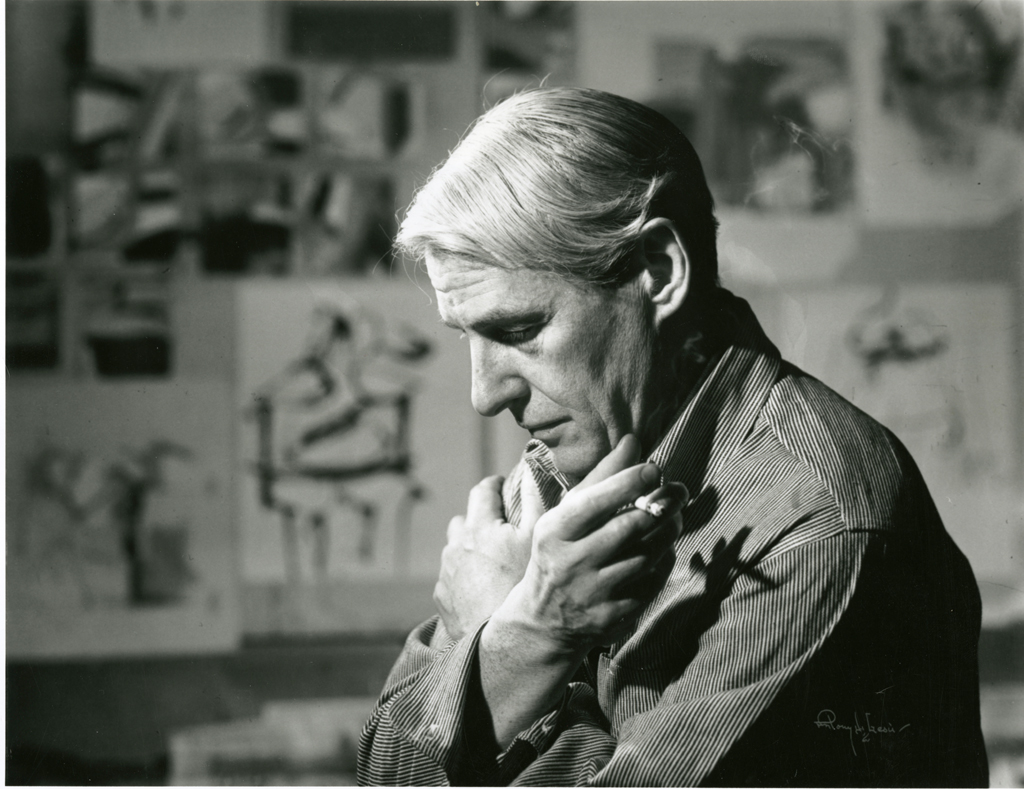
Painter and sculptor Willem de Kooning in 1961

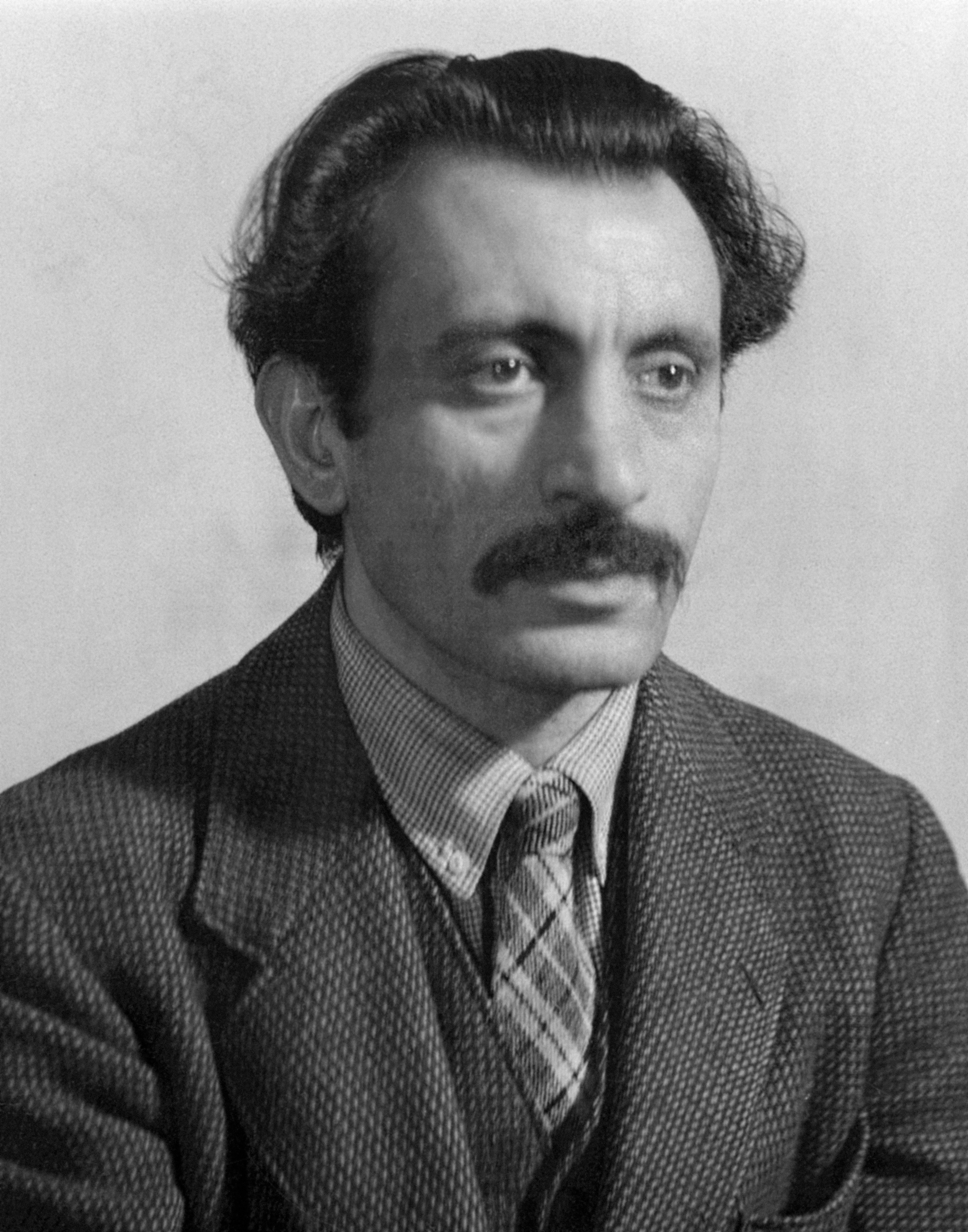
Painter Arshile Gorky in 1936

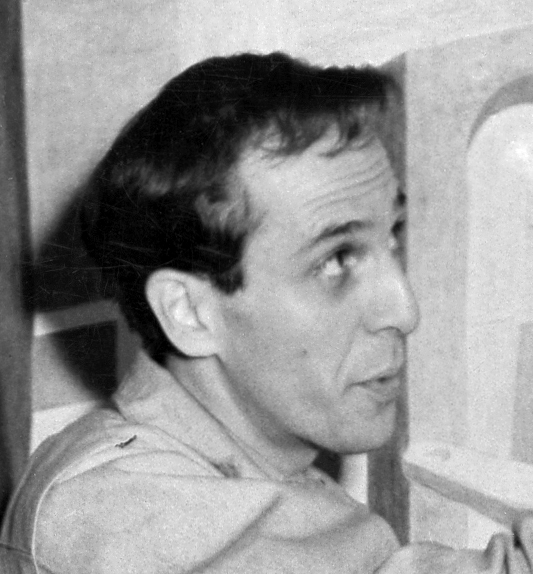
Painter Philip Guston in 1940

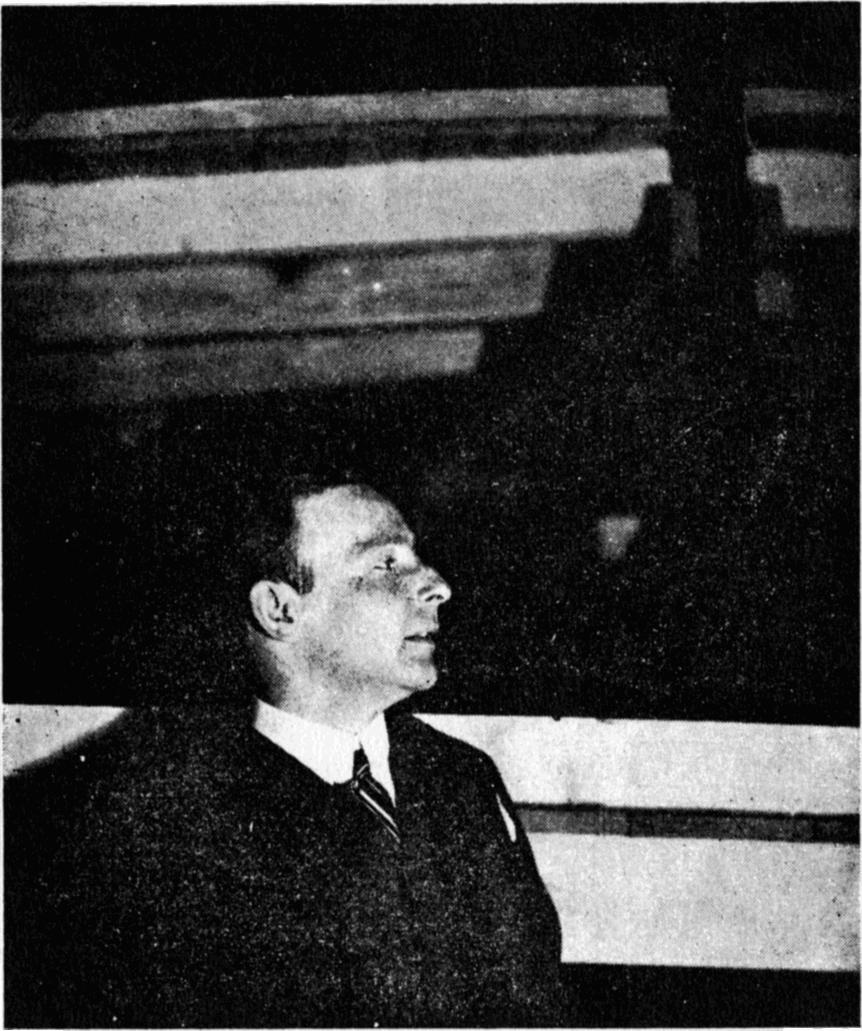
Sculptor Frederick John Kiesler in 1924

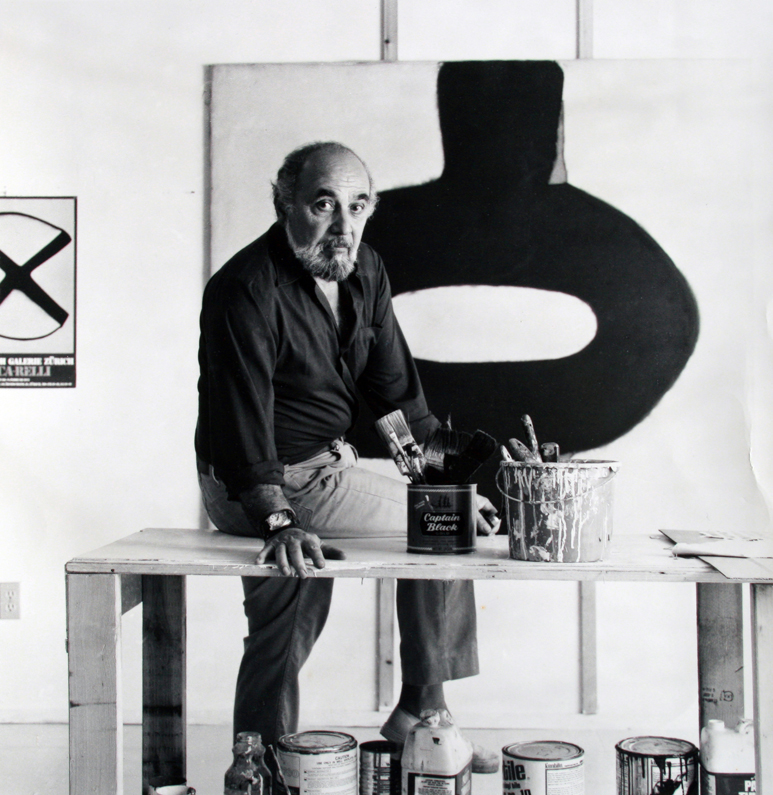
Painter Conrad Marca-Relli in 1982

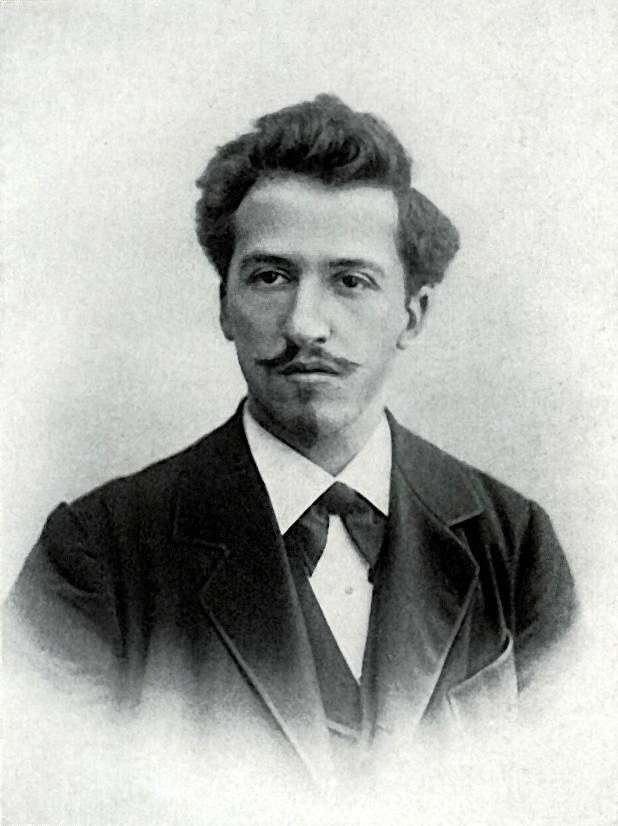
Painter Piet Mondrian in 1899

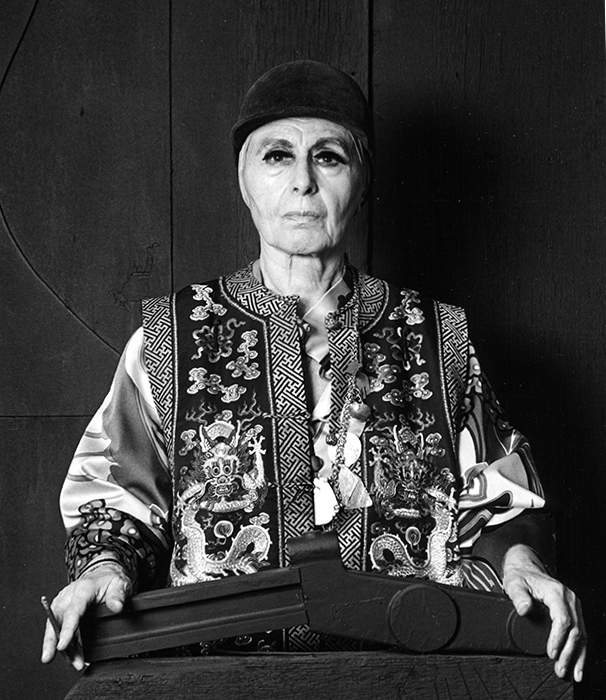
Sculptor Louise Nevelson in 1976

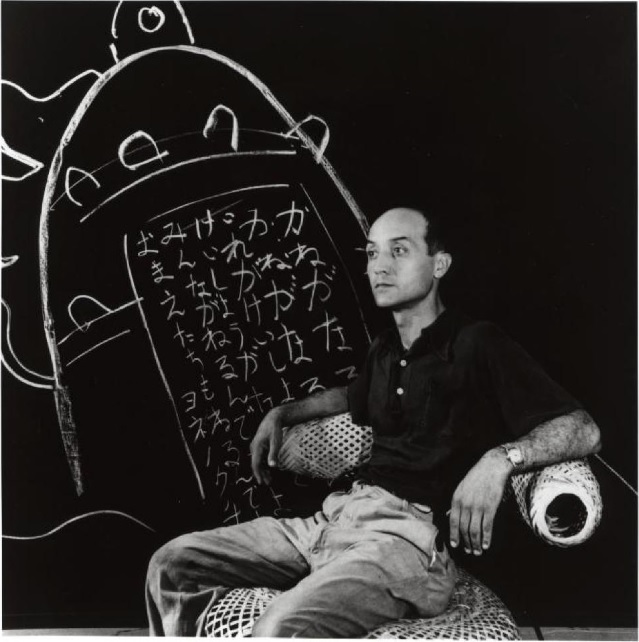
Sculptor-designer Isamu Noguchi in the 1940s

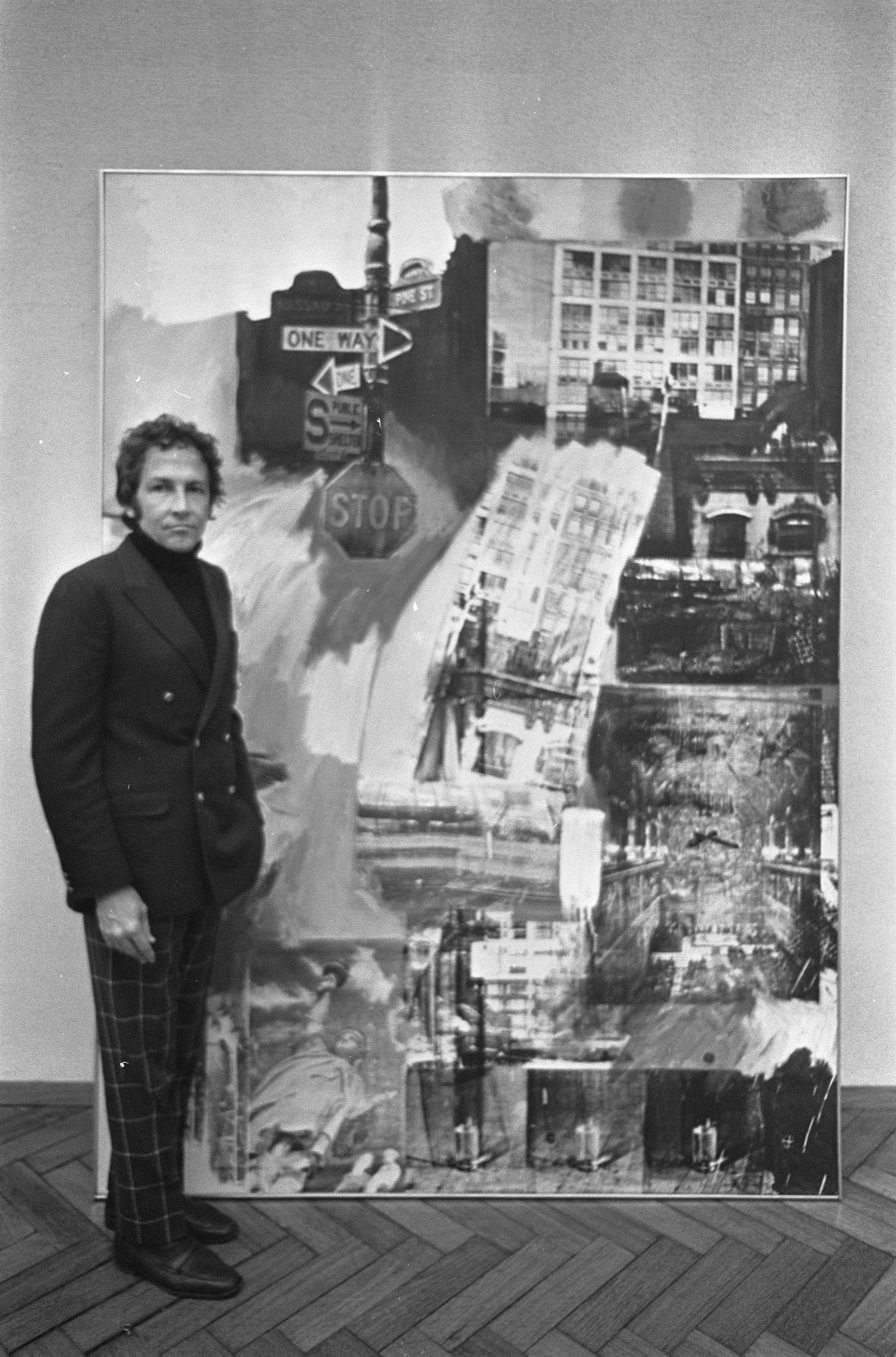
Graphic artist Robert Rauschenberg in 1968

=== Other contributors ===
(Selection was limited by availability.)

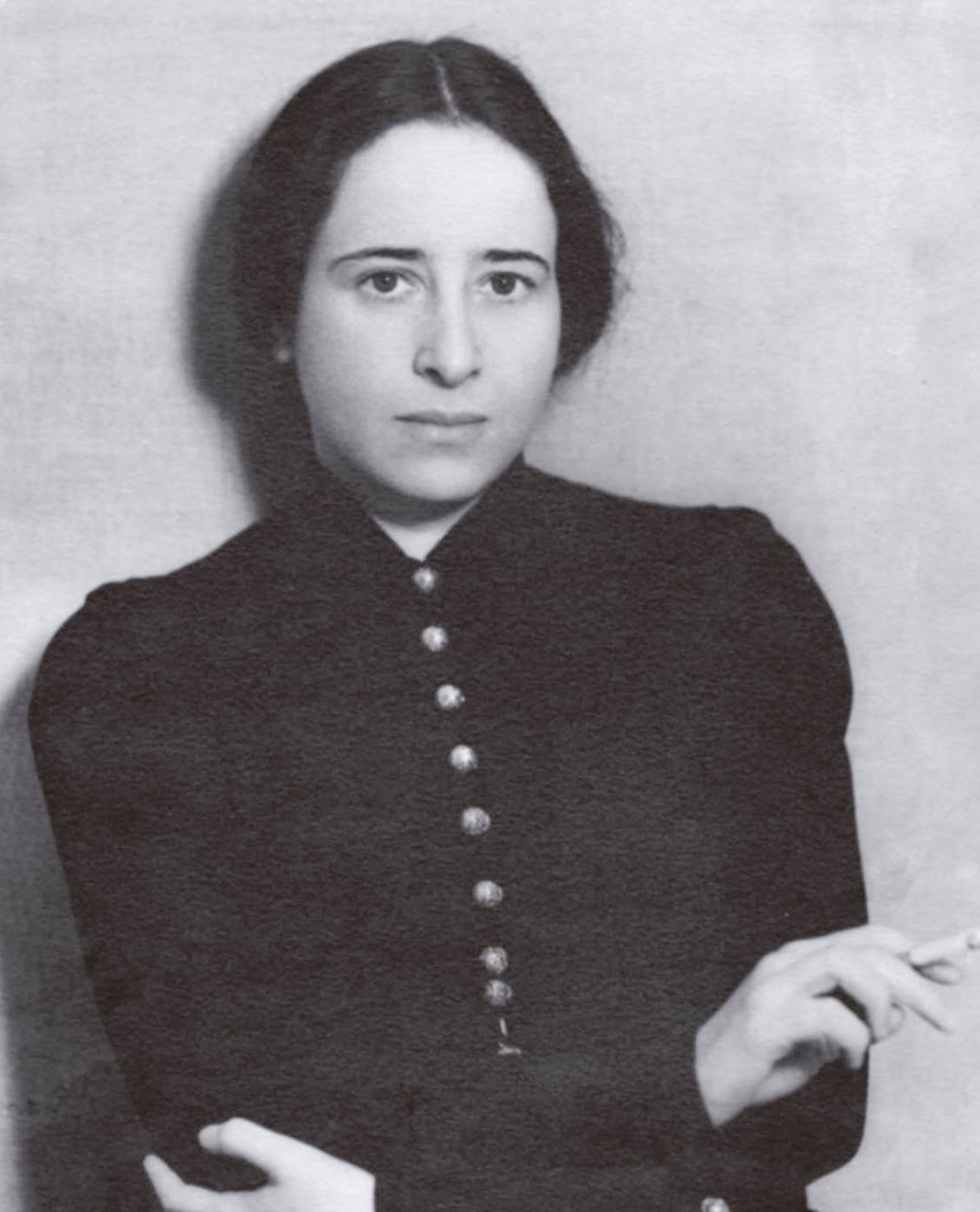
Political theorist Hannah Arendt in 1933

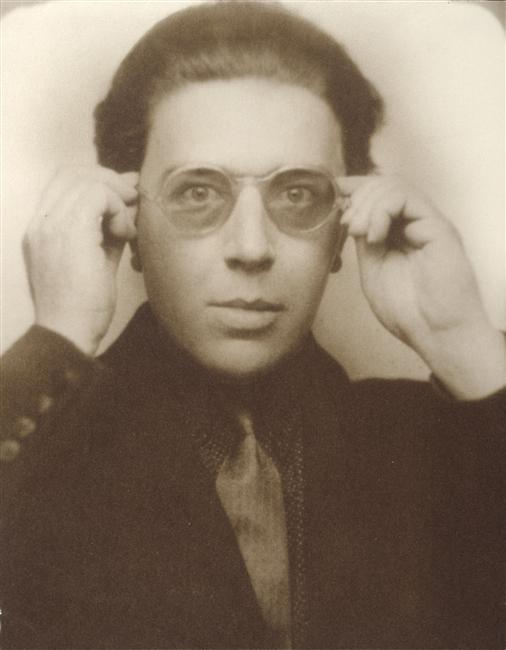
Poet and surrealist André Breton in 1924

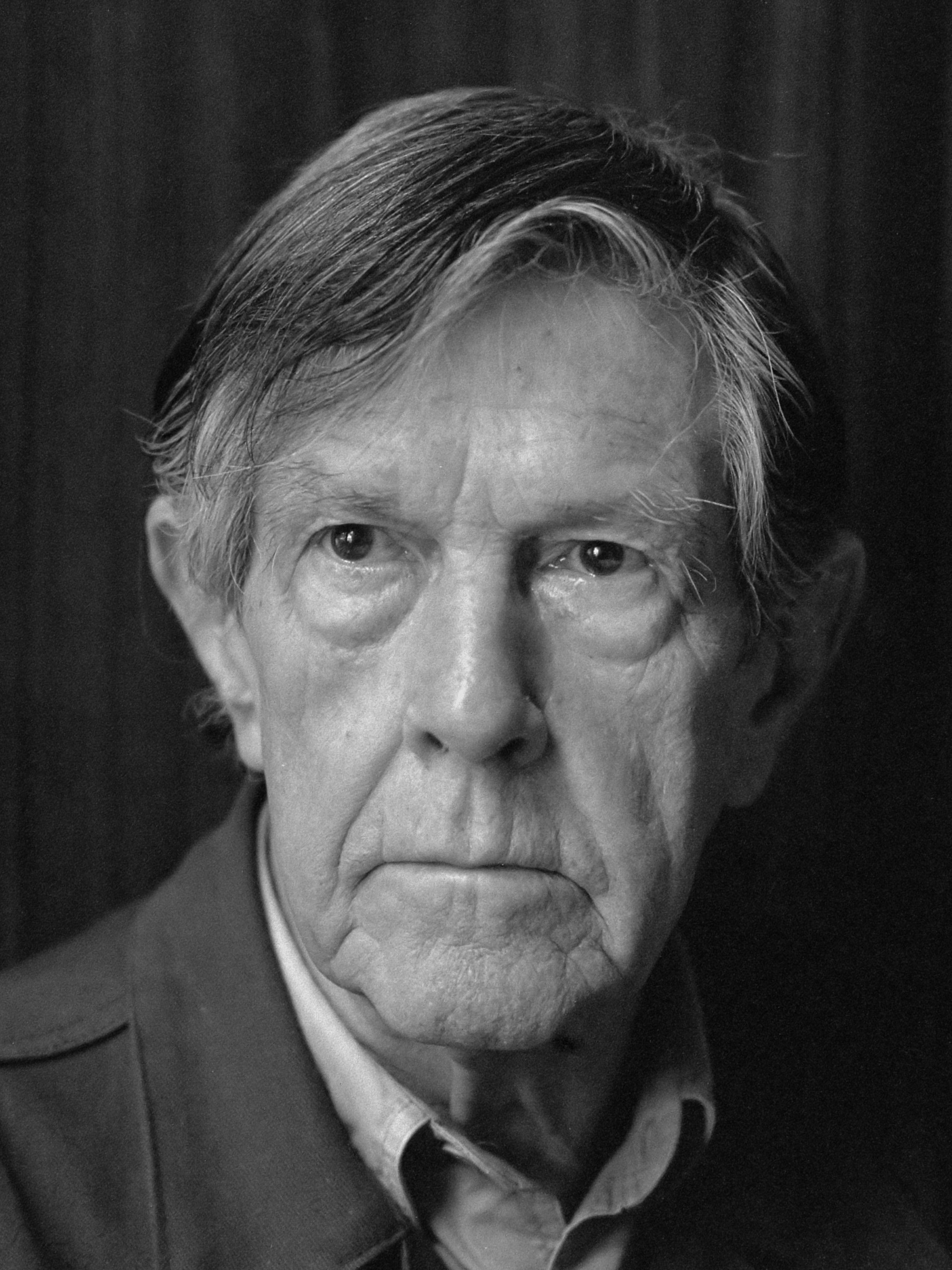
Composer John Cage in 1988

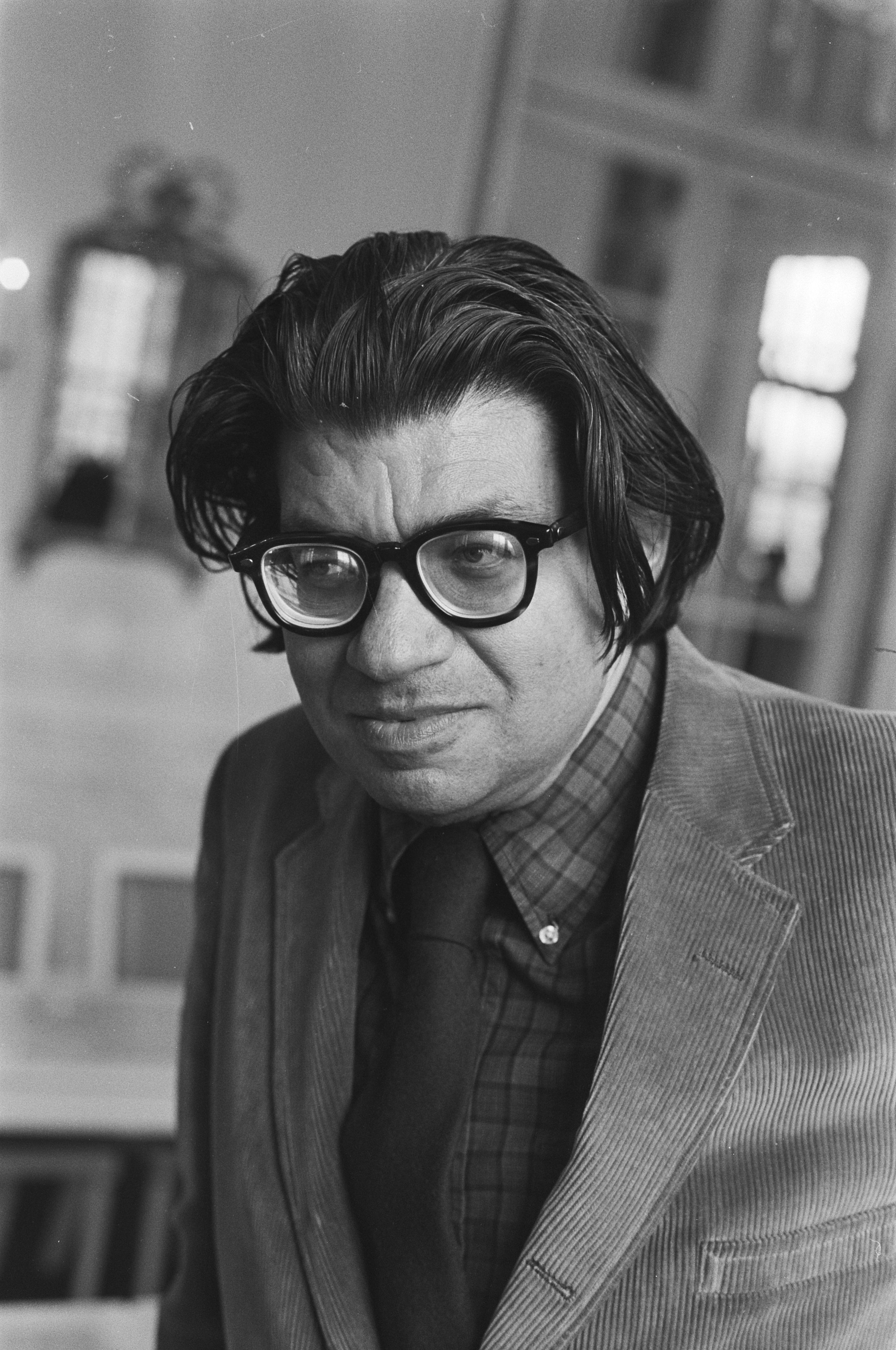
Composer Morton Feldman in 1976

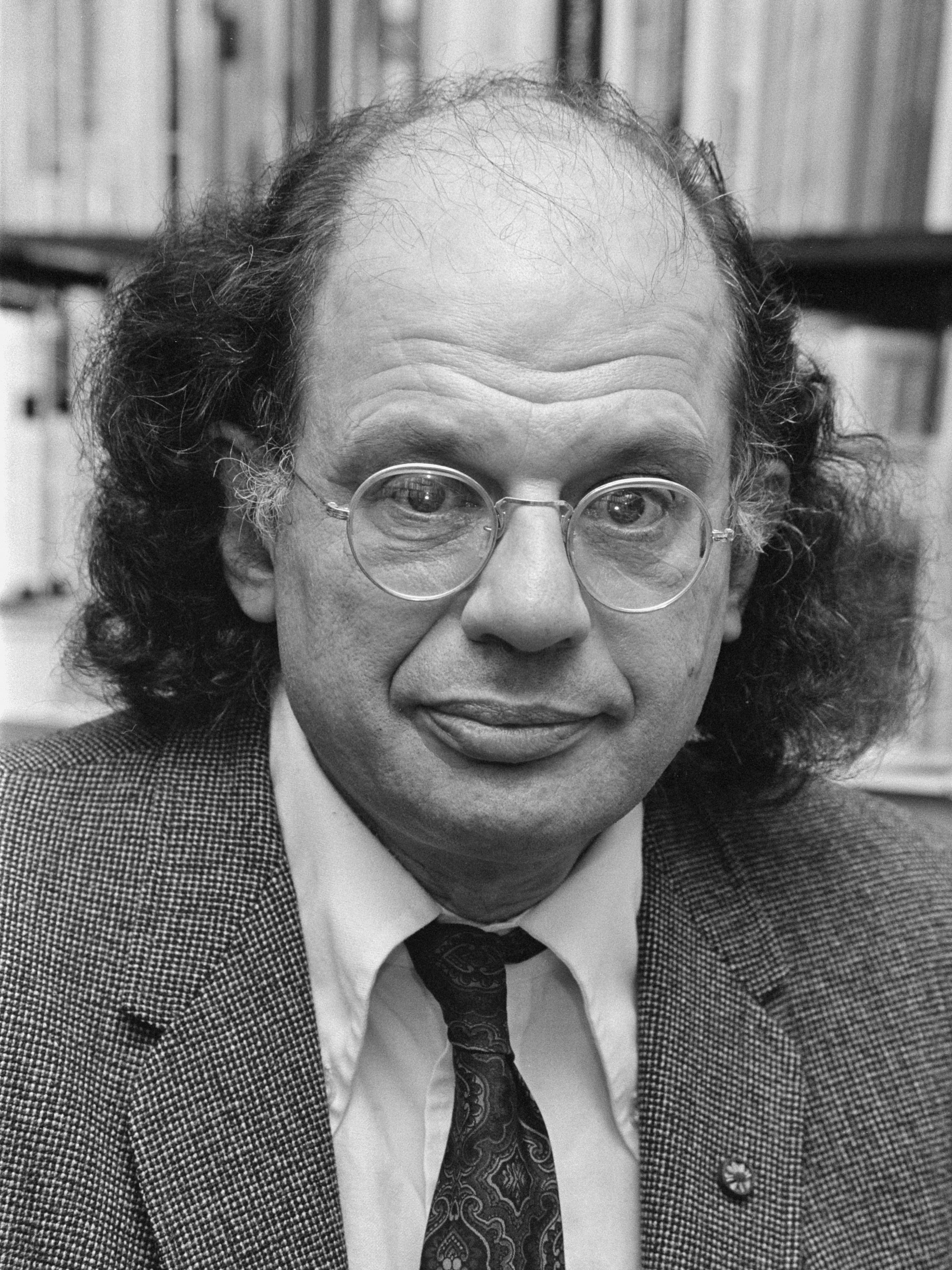
Poet Allen Ginsberg in 1979

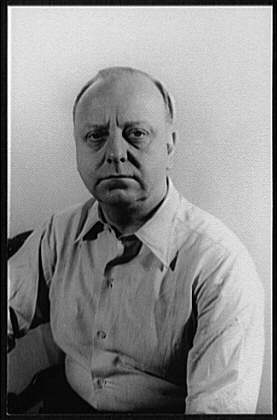
Writer Virgil Thomson in 1947

== Legacy ==
- Art critic Harold Rosenberg's influential essay "The American Action Painters" (1952) evolved from Club panels convened by Pavia on "problems" of Abstract Expressionism.
- The historic Ninth Street Show, which introduced the Western art world to the first American art movement with international influence was planned during weekly discussion groups at the Club.
- It is. A Magazine for Abstract Art, which Pavia founded as an alternate written and visual space for artists by artists was also inspired by the Club and all, or nearly all, of its contributors were Club members.
