= Milton Resnick =

American abstract painter (1917–2004)

- Untitled, c. 1990, acrylic painting on paper, private collection
- Born: January 7, 1917; Bratslav, Podolian Governorate, Russian Empire
- Died: March 12, 2004 (aged 87); New York City, U.S.
- Known for: Painting
- Movement: Abstract Expressionism
- Spouse: Pat Passlof
- Awards: Jimmy Ernst Award (1990)

Milton Resnick (January 7, 1917 – March 12, 2004) was an American artist noted for abstract paintings that coupled scale with density of incident. It was not uncommon for some of the largest paintings to weigh in excess of three hundred pounds, almost all of it pigment. He had a long and varied career, lasting about sixty-five years. He produced at least eight hundred canvases and eight thousand works on paper and board.

Both he and his wife Pat Passlof were active in the arts community as well as the poetry sphere. Resnick's poetry was later exhibited as a part of The Milton Resnick and Pat Passlof Foundation show "U+ME: Paintings and Poetry by Milton Resnick and Matthew Wong" (2023), which presented poems and paintings by Resnick and Wong to reflect the artists' visual and written dialogue.

Paintings held in public collections include: New Bride (1963), Smithsonian American Art Museum, Washington, D.C.; Mound (1961), National Gallery of Art, Washington, D.C.; Saturn (1976), National Gallery of Canada, Ottawa, Ontario; Elephant (1977), Milton Resnick and Pat Passlof Foundation, New York; Earth (1976), Museum of Modern Art, NYC; Wedding (1962), The Metropolitan Museum of Art, New York; Pink Fire (1971), National Gallery of Australia, Canberra; and Untitled (1982), Whitney Museum of American Art, New York. Many pictures of comparable quality are held in smaller public and private collections.

His remaining estate is held in trust by the Milton Resnick and Pat Passlof Foundation. In 2018, one year after the centenary of his birth, the Foundation opened his former residence and studio at 87 Eldridge Street in Manhattan as The Milton Resnick and Pat Passlof Foundation, a nonprofit public exhibition space showcasing his work alongside that of his wife Pat Passlof, other Abstract Expressionist painters, and contemporary abstractionists.

A biography of Milton Resnick (written by student/friend, painter, and critic Geoffrey Dorfman, who is also the author of the 2002 Resnick monograph Out of the Picture) — Milton Resnick: Painter in the Age of Painting — is forthcoming in September 2026.

== Childhood ==
Milton Resnick (né Reznik) was born of Jewish parentage in the village of Bratslav, now in Ukraine. His given name was Rachmiel. Both his parents came from wealthy families: the Rezniks were builders and the Mutchniks flour merchants. In the post-Revolution political turmoil of the Russian Civil War, Resnick's father abandoned his business and property in 1922 to emigrate to America along with his wife's family. They settled in Brooklyn, where Rachmiel (Milya for short) attended a public elementary school in which he received the anglicized name Milton. He would live there until 1934. In lieu of public high school, he attended the Hebrew Technical Institute on Manhattan's Lower East Side.

Disobeying his father, who had agreed to pay his tuition at the Pratt Institute, the boy dropped out and left home at seventeen to become an artist rather than an illustrator. In order to survive he first sold his blood, then worked at the American Artists School at 131 West 14th Street: doing odd jobs (running the elevator, modeling, and delivering messages) in exchange for tuition. In 1938 Resnick met Willem de Kooning, likely introduced to him by his erstwhile girlfriend, Elaine Fried. After leaving Resnick for de Kooning, Fried married the latter in 1943. Resnick enrolled in the Federal Art Project of the WPA and, though he was thrown off it in 1939, he became immersed in the art world after meeting many other artists on line for their FAP checks or at Stewart's Cafeteria, where they would congregate afterwards. In March 1941 he was drafted into the army; he served in Iceland, Normandy, Northern France, and the Rhineland. In 1945, at the age of twenty-eight, Resnick was finally discharged from the armed forces. Willem de Kooning had stored two of Resnick's paintings. The rest of his pre-war work was lost.

== Early years: Abstract expressionism ==
Resnick spent two years painting in Paris (August 1946 – 1948). His studio at 21 Rue de Seine was fortuitously located for engaging post-war French art. There he befriended the artist Wols, who lived next door. He also met Alberto Giacometti and Constantin Brancusi, among others, as well as gallerists/dealers Katia Granoff and Pierre Loeb. He observed Artaud, Matisse, Picasso, and Derain at close range. John D. Graham visited him there several times.

In 1949, Resnick was one of the founding members of the artists' club known simply as "The Club." It became the den of the community that was later named the Abstract Expressionist movement. Other founding members included Franz Kline, Willem de Kooning, Ad Reinhardt, and Jack Tworkov. "The Club" became a famous venue for intellectuals and luminaries like Dylan Thomas, Hannah Arendt, John Cage, Joseph Campbell, Buckminster Fuller, Paul Goodman, William Barrett, Edgar Varese, and the young Pierre Boulez. In 1951, Resnick participated in Leo Castelli's 9th Street Art Exhibition, the first of many organized group exhibitions of Abstract Expressionism in New York City.

After a 1949 debut exhibition at Charles Egan Gallery was cancelled due to a dispute over Egan's business practices, Resnick did not have a solo show until 1955. As a consequence, he was labeled a second generation Abstract Expressionist; his immersion in the Abstract Expressionist idiom directly after the war remained unacknowledged.

Resnick's public reputation increased through the late 1950s and early 1960s. With the new decade, his work — previously characterized by muscular, sometimes chunky interlocking forms that seemed to function as a byproduct of a generalized aggressive attack — began to be replaced with a less fraught, loose and dispersive handling of paint. His paintings simultaneously began to assume a massive size, the largest of which, Swan (1961) reached over 273 inches in length.

In 1961 he married Pat Passlof, an accomplished painter and former pupil of de Kooning. For the greater part of their 40+ year marriage, they lived separately but close to one other on Manhattan's Lower East Side.

== Maturity ==
Night, oil on canvas, 93 x 104 inches, 1977

With the rise of Pop Art and optical painting, not to mention Neo-Dada and Conceptualism, Resnick withdrew somewhat from the art world. Increasingly tending his own garden, he turned inward and began to produce — in complete disregard and perhaps defiance — the dense and rigorous all-over abstractions that would make his reputation. He was an indefatigable worker. These paintings often took months to accomplish before they were realized to his satisfaction.

In 1971, Resnick was selected as artist-in-residence at Roswell Museum and Art Center, New Mexico, where he had a solo exhibition. In the same year, he was awarded a significant exhibition ("Milton Resnick: Selected Large Paintings") featuring paintings from 1958 to 1970 at the Fort Worth Art Center Museum in Texas. "Selected Large Paintings" later traveled to the Milwaukee Art Center. In 1985, the Contemporary Arts Museum Houston mounted a retrospective exhibition ("Milton Resnick: Paintings 1945-1985"). He also taught during these years, serving in a visiting capacity at several universities, but never joined any faculty.

In 1976 he bought a synagogue on the Lower East Side, at 87 Eldridge Street — around the corner from a synagogue owned by Passloff, his wife — and lived and worked in it until his death in 2004.

== Later life ==
In the 1980s, he painted more than one hundred and forty small abstractions on stiff planks of cardboard along with many canvases. In 1986, he started to introduce into his pictures proto-human figures — often in a cruciform or slingshot gestalt — that were nearly interchangeable with his sign for a tree. Still, the paintings remained largely abstract in feeling and tone. No inviting space beckoned the viewer nor compromised the distinctive agitation of the surface that, along with a preference for mineralized color, would characterize much of Resnick's work in the last forty years of his life.

He also painted numerous strange hermetic insignias. The X, a sign of negation, frequently decomposed into two elbows that often didn't align properly. His attitude towards symmetry and order remained light-heartedly derisive. He always maintained that ideas and narratives were just grist for his mill: nothing more. Content had no significance to him other than to provide an occasion to paint. He didn't generate ideas but made use of them as subjects. As his debilitating arthritis made it impossible for to him to stand and work on canvas, much of his late work was painted on paper, often with acrylic or gouache. His written poetry became increasingly important to him in the last ten years of his life.

Milton Resnick committed suicide in March 2004.

His first posthumous solo show ("A Question of Seeing") was held at Cheim & Read, New York, in 2008. Further shows were held at Mana Contemporary, Jersey City, New Jersey (2014); Miguel Abreu Gallery, New York (2018); and The Milton Resnick and Pat Passlof Foundation, New York.

== Bibliography ==
- Works of the 1960s and 1970s: Frieze Masters, 2012, (New York: Cheim & Read, 2012.)
- Philip Larratt-Smith, The Elephant in the Room: Paintings from the 1960s to 1980s, (New York: Cheim & Read, 2011.) ISBN 978-0-98176-558-7.
- Nathan Kernan, Milton Resnick, A Question of Seeing, Paintings 1959–1963, (New York: Cheim & Read, 2008.) ISBN 978-0-97973-977-4.
- Geoffrey Dorfman, Out of the Picture, Milton Resnick and the New York School, (New York: Midmarch Arts Press, 2003.) ISBN 1-877675-47-4.
- Marika Herskovic, American Abstract Expressionism of the 1950s An Illustrated Survey, (New York: New York School Press, 2003.) ISBN 0-9677994-1-4. p. 282-285.
- Marika Herskovic, New York School Abstract Expressionists Artists Choice by Artists, (New York: New York School Press, 2000.) ISBN 0-9677994-0-6. p. 12; p. 16; p. 38; p. 302-305.
