= Alfred Russell (artist) =

American painter (1920–2007)

- Russell in the 1960s
- Born: May 27, 1920
- Died: September 22, 2007 (aged 87); New York, New York
- Known for: Painting

Alfred Russell (May 27, 1920 – September 22, 2007) was an artist who was a member of the early New York school of Abstract Expressionism. He exhibited in Paris and New York along with such well known painters as Willem de Kooning, Jackson Pollock, Ad Reinhardt and Mark Rothko. Later in life, Russell, disillusioned with abstraction, turned to figurative painting, with inspiration from the classical world.

Russell, active in abstract circles in New York until 1953, was regularly included in the Whitney Annual as well as being part of seven exhibits of Museum of Modern Art's "Abstract Painting and Sculpture in America". In New York he had three solo shows at the Peridot Gallery as well as being in early Abstract Expressionist group shows at the Sidney Janis Gallery, the Kootz Gallery and at the Galerie de France in Paris.

Russell caustically renounced avant-garde abstraction in a Symposium on the Human Figure in 1953. Thereafter, Russell painted mainly in classically and surrealistically figurative styles that still showed influence of abstractionism. His last New York exhibit was at the Tatischeff Gallery in 1979 as his later work was rarely exhibited. In addition to producing stylistically controversial work, after the 1950s, his latent anti-Semitism had become exposed and he had essentially destroyed any chance for a continuing career outside of academia.

Russell studied at the Art Student's League and earned a master's degree at Columbia University. He also studied printmaking at the Atelier 17 in both Paris and New York. Teaching at the M.F.A program at Brooklyn College from 1946 until 1976, when he retired, Russell influenced many younger artists in figurative painting including Gabriel Laderman.

Russell is represented in the collections of the Whitney Museum of American Art, the National Gallery of Art, the Brooklyn Museum, and the Detroit Institute of Arts.
