= Peter Agostini =

American sculptor (1913–1993)

- Born: February 14, 1913; Hell's Kitchen, New York City
- Died: March 28, 1993 (aged 80); Atlanta, Georgia
- Education: Leonardo da Vinci Art School (1935-1936), largely self-taught
- Known for: Sculpture
- Notable work: Plaster cast sculptures of everyday objects: beer cans, eggs, pillows, and balloons
- Style: Pop Art; New York School
- Movement: Expressionism
- Children: Diana Agostini Whelan, Celine November
- Elected: National Academy of Design, 1990

Peter Salvatore Agostini (1913-1993, some sources list middle name as Joseph) was an American sculptor, credited as a Pop Art pioneer of the 1960s, along with Andy Warhol and Claes Oldenburg. Associated with several New York School artists, including Franz Kline, Jackson Pollock, Arshile Gorky, Willem de Kooning and David Smith, Agostini did not classify himself as Pop. He also "never abandoned the traditional subjects of sculpture like the human head and figure, and particularly the horse." As a ghost artist, the equivalent of a ghostwriter, he redesigned Elsie the Cow for Borden in the early 1950s.

Frequently praised for his "extremely beautiful and often original" work, Agostini's identity as an artist was long considered a "puzzle." ARTNews editor Thomas B. Hess rebutted that opinion by noting that Agostini was “an artist with many arrows to his bow who is working in a period that likes the monolithic shaft.” Judith E. Stein in Art in America concurred, writing that "Agostini has always been his own man, an artist whose concern for pure esthetic values has never impeded his search for new sculptural forms or new techniques to achieve them."

In a 1975 review, the New York Times praised Agostini without reservation, describing him as "an artist who combines imagination, ability and humor in his plaster, bronze and terra cotta works," before explaining that:

Although his shapes may bulge, pinch or even atrophy, they assertively suggest the human condition, including its strengths and frailties and its virtues and vices. The works synthesize both a world of reality and one of fantasy, shuttling freely between the two. The sculptor is a protean talent, allowing his objects to assume many forms and to follow multiple stylistic directions. But for all the differences in the various sculptures, his hand is eminently recognizable.

Largely self-taught, Agostini's early influences included both Elie Nadelman and Alberto Giacometti, but the work he is best known for is characterized by a surreal, even humorous idiosyncratic style that molded "found art," from "'frozen life' pieces, such as clotheslines, pillows, and squeezed inner tubes as well as work that suggested more turbulent themes, such as hurricanes and 'action horses' in plaster." Describing his own work, Agostini emphasized feeling over form:

That is the prime thing—to generate “up”—leverage, elevation. The balloons rising, clothes on a line being picked up by the wind. The same with my horses. Whatever use they are, my horses are about flight, bursting out.

== Early life and education ==
His mother, Genevieve (Jennie) Vulicevic, died of influenza when he was four years old. His father, Salvatore Peter Agostini, owned an employment agency that went bankrupt because he extended credit during the Depression. Both Jennie and Salvatore had been born in Dalmatia, and Salvatore was an anarchist. Peter's stepmother didn't want to be bothered with children, so they were put in various homes. He remembered a French convent where he was called "petit Peirre." His brother Chris, whom he deemed the better artist, ran away from this home, and later died at age 22. Peter spent less than two years (1935-1936) at the tuition-free "New Deal" Leonardo da Vinci Art School where he became friends with artists George Spaventa and Nicholas Carone.

== Career ==
In 1939, Agostini joined the Works Progress Administration (WPA) Federal Art Project where he worked as both a mold-maker for other sculptors and as a mannequin-maker. Both jobs gave Agostini valuable experience with "'quick-setting plaster,' and helped him hit upon a way of casting directly from objects which bypassed the needed for modeling and emphasized the free, flowing properties of both the medium and the forms he chose."

In 1959, Agostini held his first one-man show at the Galerie Grimaud. In 1960, he began showing at the Stephen Radich Gallery and, over the next few years, was celebrated by Time and ArtNews and participated in the 1964 World’s Fair exhibition, alongside Roy Lichtenstein and Robert Mallary." That same year, Agostini was also a recipient of a Guggenheim Foundation Fellowship. In 1990, Agostini was elected a full member of the National Academy of Design. His work would go on to be exhibited in four Whitney Biennial shows and, by the end of his career, had participated in 25 solo shows and more than 100 group shows world-wide. He claimed that his artistic career amounted to looking for "the essence of woman," and he did an important show while at UNC-Greensboro with the title "Women."

Agostini taught sculpture and painting at multiple institutions, including the New York Studio School, Columbia University, the University of North Carolina at Greensboro, and the Parsons School of Design. Watercolorist Ellen Murray studied with Agostini.

== Galleries ==
A handful of the NYC-based galleries Agostini was associated with include:

- Cantor Fitzgerald Gallery
- Galerie Grimaud
- Stephen Radich Gallery
- Anita Shapolsky Gallery
- Olaf Clasen Gallery
- Salander O’Reilly Gallery
- Bernice Steinbaum Gallery
- Zabriskie Gallery

== Collections ==
Agostini's work has been collected by several notable institutions, including the:

- Solomon R. Guggenheim Museum, NYC
- Hirshhorn Museum and Sculpture Garden, Washington DC
- Metropolitan Museum of Art, NYC
- Museum of Modern Art (MoMA), NYC
- Wadsworth Athenaeum, Hartford, CT
- Walker Art Center, Minneapolis, Minnesota
- Whitney Museum of American Art, NYC

== Personal ==
He was married to the writer and actor Marina Herbert Agostini (stage name Marina Brian), until she died in 1961 of cancer. Her papers are in the Archives of American Art at the Smithsonian. She was the mother of their daughter, Diana Agostini Whelan of New York City. He has another daughter, Celine November, of New Jersey. Two other marriages are recorded for him, one with Dura Janna Zwart in 1940, and one with Phyll Agne in 1966.
