= Nicolas Carone =

American painter

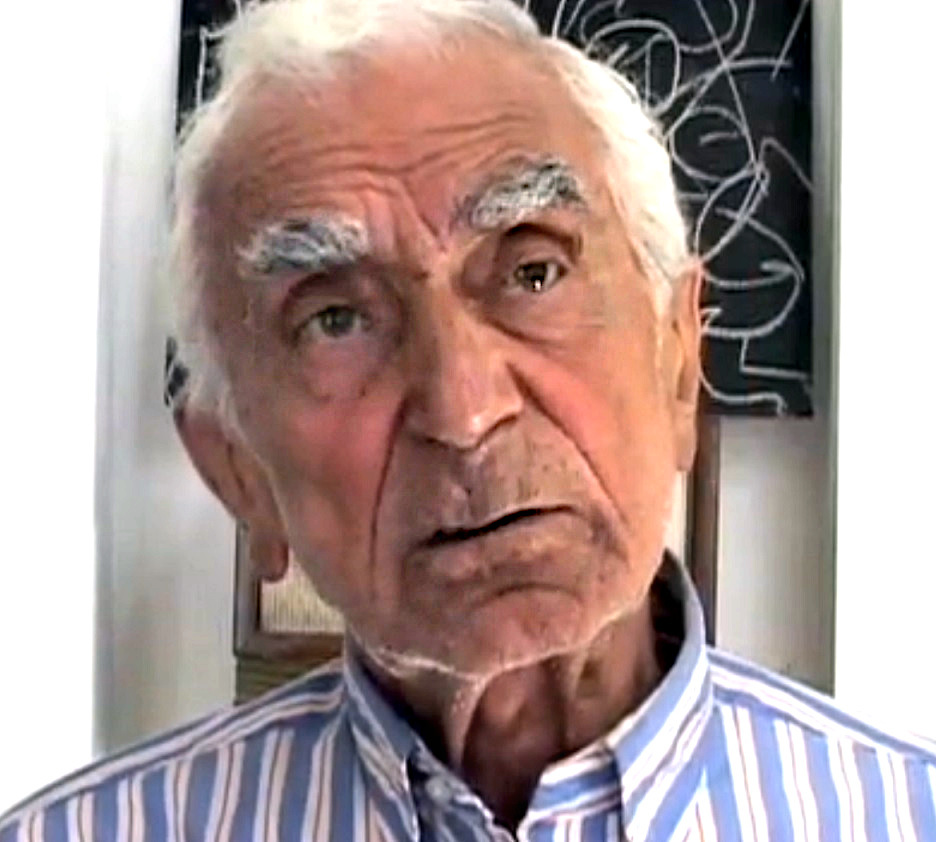
- Carone in Speaking Portraits (early 2000's)
- Born: June 4, 1917; New York City, United States
- Died: July 15, 2010 (aged 93); Hudson, New York United States
- Education: National Academy of Design, Art Students League of New York, Hans Hofmann School of Fine Arts, Rome Academy of Fine Arts
- Known for: painting
- Movement: Abstract expressionism
- Children: David Hart, Claude Carone, Christian Carone
- Awards: 1941 Prix de Rome; 1949 Fulbright Fellowship; Pollock-Krasner Foundation Lifetime Achievement Award

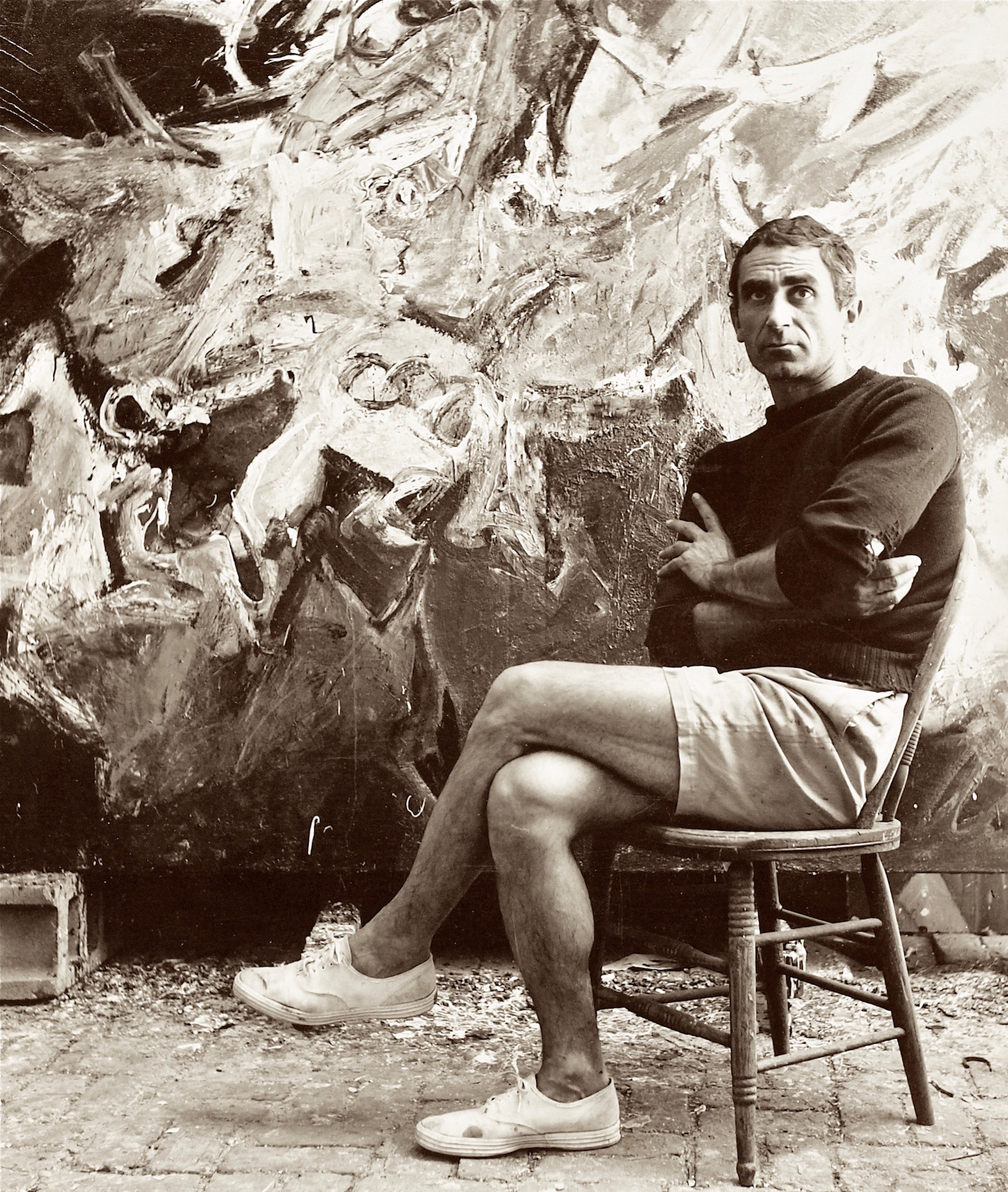
Nicolas Carone, sitting in his studio in East Hampton, NY, in the late 1950s, with his painting Nuptial Waters, 1957, behind him

Nicolas Carone (June 4, 1917 – July 15, 2010) belonged to the early generation of New York School Abstract Expressionist artists. Their artistic innovation by the 1950s had been recognized internationally, including in London and Paris. New York School Abstract Expressionism, represented by Jackson Pollock, Willem de Kooning, Franz Kline, Conrad Marca-Relli and others, became a leading art movement of the postwar era.

== Biography ==
Carone was born June 4, 1917, into an Italian-American family in New York City. They moved to Hoboken, New Jersey, where he grew up. He began formal art studies at the age of eleven at the Leonardo da Vinci School located at St. Mark's Church on E. 10th St. He studied at the National Academy of Design under Leon Kroll, Art Students League of New York, Hans Hofmann School of Fine Arts, and the Rome Academy of Fine Arts.

In 1941 he won the Rome Prize and in 1949 a Fulbright Fellowship. Both gave him an opportunity to study art in Italy. During his time in Italy after World War II, he came into personal contact with important Italian painters, particularly Giorgio Morandi.

After returning to the US, Carone continued to paint and exhibited works in the 9th Street Art Exhibition in 1951. Along with other first generation abstract expressionists, he also showed his work at the Stable Gallery. Carone was a part of the Abstract Expressionist movement, which relied heavily on Surrealism, poetry, and interpretations of Jungian psychology. He was a good friend of Jackson Pollock, a noted abstract painter. He was later interviewed by authors Steven Naifeh and Gregory White Smith for their biography, Jackson Pollock: An American Saga.

Nicolas Carone's work is in the collections of museums including the Whitney Museum of American Art, the Metropolitan Museum of Art, the Hirshhorn Museum and Sculpture Garden, the Baltimore Museum of Art, and the Mobile Museum of Art. Recent exhibits of his work were held at the Washburn Gallery in New York City from February 2 to March 31, 2012, and the Watson MacRae Gallery in South Florida from March 2 to April 3, 2010. His work was exhibited by a number of galleries, including at the Anita Shapolsky Gallery, Frumkin Gallery, Stable Gallery, and Staempfli Gallery.

Carone taught at universities including Yale University, Columbia University, Brandeis University, Cornell University, Cooper Union, School of Visual Arts, and Skowhegan School. He was a founding faculty member of the New York Studio School of Drawing, Painting and Sculpture, where he taught for 25 years. In 1988 he founded the International School of Art, located first in Todi, Italy and then in Nearby Montecastello. Carone was consulted by dealers, collectors and film makers regarding his expertise on Arshile Gorky and Pollock, including for the films Pollock, starring Ed Harris, and Who the *$&% Is Jackson Pollock?

He died July 15, 2010, at the age of 93.

== Sources ==
- Marika Herskovic, American Abstract and Figurative Expressionism Style Is Timely Art Is Timeless An Illustrated Survey With Artists' Statements, Artwork and Biographies. (New York School Press, 2009.) ISBN 978-0-9677994-2-1. p. 64–67
- Marika Herskovic, American Abstract Expressionism of the 1950s An Illustrated Survey, (New York School Press, 2003.) ISBN 0-9677994-1-4. p. 74–77
- Marika Herskovic, New York School Abstract Expressionists Artists Choice by Artists, (New York School Press, 2000.) ISBN 0-9677994-0-6. p. 8; p. 16; p. 19; p. 25; p. 36; p. 94–97
- Leja, Michael, "Reframing Abstract Expressionism: Subjectivity and Painting in the 1940s. Yale University Press. 1993. ISBN 0-300-07082-9
- Hilton Kramer, Nicolas Carone Shows He’s Still Unsurpassed On the Female Nude | The New York Observer Nov. 2005
- Nicolas Carone at the Lohin Geduld Gallery: list of exhibitions Nicolas Carone (American), 1917: Featured artist works, exhibitions and biography fromLohin Geduld Gallery
- Thomas Longhi, The Brooklyn Rail
