= Ad Reinhardt =

American painter and printmaker

- Reinhardt at work on one of his 60x60" Abstract Black Painting, circa 1960
- Born: Adolph Friedrich Reinhardt; December 24, 1913; Buffalo, New York, US
- Died: August 30, 1967 (aged 53); New York City, US
- Notable work: The Black Paintings
- Movement: Abstract Expressionism Minimal Art Geometric abstraction

Adolph Friedrich Reinhardt (December 24, 1913 – August 30, 1967) was an American abstract painter and art theorist active in New York City for more than three decades. As a theorist he wrote and lectured extensively on art and was a major influence on conceptual art, minimal art, and monochrome painting.

Most famous for his "black" or "ultimate" paintings, he claimed to be painting the "last paintings" that anyone can paint. He believed in a philosophy of art he called Art-as-Art and used his writing and satirical cartoons to advocate for abstract art and against what he described as "the disreputable practices of artists-as-artists".

He was a member of the American Abstract Artists (AAA) and part of the movement centered on the Betty Parsons Gallery that became known as Abstract Expressionism. He was also a member of The Club, the meeting place for the New York School abstract expressionist artists during the 1940s and 1950s.

== Background ==
Reinhardt was born in Buffalo, New York, and lived with his family in the Riverside section along the Niagara River. His cousin Otto and he were close, as well as the extended family, but work took his father to New York City. He later studied art history at Columbia College of Columbia University, where he was a close friend of Robert Lax and Thomas Merton. The three developed similar concepts of simplicity in different directions. Reinhardt considered himself a painter from a very early age and began winning prizes for painting in grade school and high school. Feeling that he had already acquired all the technical skills in high school he turned down scholarships at art schools and accepted a full scholarship at Columbia University which he attended from 1931 to 1935. Reinhardt studied under the art historian Meyer Schapiro. He took painting classes as an undergraduate at Columbia's Teachers College and after graduation began to study painting with Carl Holty and Francis Criss at the American Artists School, while simultaneously studying portraiture at the National Academy of Design under Karl Anderson.

Upon finishing college he was accredited as a painter by Burgoyne Diller, which allowed him to work from 1936 until 1940 for the WPA Federal Art Project, easel division. Sponsored by Holty he became a member of the American Abstract Artists group, with whom he exhibited for the next decade. Reinhardt described his association with the group as "one of the greatest things that ever happened to me". He participated in group exhibitions at the Peggy Guggenheim Gallery, and he had his first one-man show at the Artists Gallery in 1943. He then went on to be represented by Betty Parsons, exhibiting first at the Wakefield Bookshop, the Mortimer Brandt Gallery and then when Parsons opened her own gallery on 57th street. Reinhardt had regular solo exhibitions yearly at the Betty Parsons Gallery beginning in 1946. He was involved in the 1940 protest against MoMA, designing the leaflet that asked How modern is the Museum of Modern Art? His works were displayed regularly throughout the 1940s and 1950s at the Annual Exhibitions held at the Whitney Museum of American Art. He was also part of the protest against the Metropolitan Museum of Art in 1950 which became known as "The Irascibles."

Having completed his studies at the New York University Institute of Fine Arts, Reinhardt became a teacher at Brooklyn College in 1947 and taught there until his death from a heart attack in 1967. He also taught at the California School of Fine Arts in San Francisco, the University of Wyoming, Yale University and Hunter College, New York. He was survived by his wife Rita and their daughter Anna.

== Works ==
=== Paintings ===
Reinhardt's earliest exhibited paintings avoided representation, but show a steady progression away from objects and external reference. His work progressed from compositions of geometrical shapes in the 1940s to works in different shades of the same color (all red, all blue, all white) in the 1950s.

Reinhardt is best known for his so-called "black" paintings of the 1960s, which appear at first glance to be simply canvases painted black but are actually composed of black and nearly black shades. Among many other suggestions, these paintings ask if there can be such a thing as an absolute, even in black, which some viewers may not consider a color at all.

In 1967 he contributed one of 17 signed prints that made up the portfolio Artists and Writers Protest Against the War in Viet Nam organized by the group Artists and Writers Protest. Reinhardt's lithograph, known as "No War" from its first two words of text, shows both sides of an air mail post card addressed to "War Chief, Washington, D.C. U.S.A." with a list of 34 demands that includes "no napalm," "no bombing," "no poverty," "no art of war," and admonitions concerning art itself, "no art in war" and "no art on war." That same year, Reinhardt received a Guggenheim Fellowship for Fine Arts.

=== Writings ===
His writing includes comments on his own work and that of his contemporaries. His concise wit, sharp focus, and sense of abstraction make them interesting reading even for those who have not seen his paintings. Like his paintings, his writing remains controversial decades after its composition. Many of his writings are collected in Art as Art, edited by Barbara Rose, University of California Press, 1991.

=== Graphics ===
Reinhardt joined the staff of PM in 1942 and he worked full-time at this daily newspaper until 1947, with time out while drafted for active duty in the U.S. Navy. While at PM he produced several thousand cartoons and illustrations most notably the series of famous and widely reproduced How to Look at Art series. Reinhardt also illustrated the highly influential and controversial pamphlet Races of Mankind (1943) originally intended for distribution to the U.S. Army, but after being banned subsequently sold close to a million copies. He also illustrated a children's book A Good Man and His Good Wife. While attending Columbia University he designed many covers and illustrations for the humor magazine Jester and was its editor in his senior year (1934–35). In 1940 he was the designer of "The Chelsea Document", a public exhibition of five 4x8 foot panels. Other commercial art work was done "for such varied employers as the Brooklyn Dodgers, Glamour magazine, the CIO, Macy's, The New York Times, the National Council of American-Soviet Friendship, The Book and Magazine Guild, the American Jewish Labor Council, New Masses, the Saturday Evening Post, Ice Cream World, and Listen magazine. He illustrated many books such as Who's Who in the Zoo. Cartoons and illustrations were generally regarded as outside the canon of fine art in 1950s America, which was dominated by abstract painting. However, this aspect of Reinhardt’s oeuvre has garnered renewed interest in recent decades. In 2013, Robert Storr curated a dedicated room showcasing Reinhardt's cartoons at the David Zwirner Gallery in New York.

== Recent exhibitions ==
- The Guggenheim Museum has shown Reinhardt's Black Painting as part of their Imageless exhibition, which closed September 14, 2008.
- The Josef Albers Museum Quadrat in Bottrop, Germany showed Reinhardt's Last Paintings and earlier works along with works from Josef Albers (Hommage to the Square and other) from September 2010 to January 2011. Both worked at Yale University in 1952/53 when J. Albers offered Reinhardt a guest professorship.
- In the fall 2013, David Zwirner Gallery held a major exhibition of Reinhardt's black paintings, cartoons, and photographic slides, curated by Robert Storr. It was the first exhibition since Reinhardt's 1991 retrospective at MoMA to feature an entire room of black paintings (13 in all).
- Art vs. History, the first large scale exhibition in Europe focusing on Reinhardt's cartoons, comics and collages, was exhibited in Malmö Konsthall in June–September 2015 and in EMMA – Espoo Museum of Modern Art in March–April 2016.
- The Fundación Juan March Madrid exhibited Ad Reinhardt: Art Is Art and Everything Else Is Everything Else from October 15, 2021 – January 16, 2022. It was the first dedicated to Reinhardt in Spain and included "118 works: 47 paintings and drawings, and 71 books, magazines, newspapers, pamphlets and other documentary material." The exhibition was created in collaboration with the Ad Reinhardt Foundation and with the support of the Terra Foundation for American Art.

== Bibliography ==
- Lippard, Lucy R. Ad Reinhardt (Harry N. Abrams, 1981.) ISBN 0-8109-1554-5, ISBN 978-0-8109-1554-1
- Marika Herskovic, American Abstract Expressionism of the 1950s An Illustrated Survey, (New York School Press, 2003.) ISBN 0-9677994-1-4. p. 278–281
- Marika Herskovic, New York School Abstract Expressionists Artists Choice by Artists, (New York School Press, 2000.) ISBN 0-9677994-0-6. p. 16; p. 38; p. 298–301
- Busch, Julia M. (1974) A Decade of Sculpture: the New Media in the 1960s, The Art Alliance Press (Associated University Presses), ISBN 0-87982-007-1
- Müller-Yao, Marguerite Hui: Der Einfluß der Kunst der chinesischen Kalligraphie auf die westliche informelle Malerei, Diss. Bonn, Köln 1985. ISBN 3-88375-051-4
- Müller-Yao, Marguerite: Informelle Malerei und chinesische Kalligrafie, in: Informel, Begegnung und Wandel, (hrsg von Heinz Althöfer, Schriftenreihe des Museums am Ostwall; Bd. 2), Dortmund 2002, ISBN 3-611-01062-6
- Stratenschulte, Julian: Josef Albers Museum Opens Exhibition of the Last Paintings Made by Ad Reinhardt at artdaily.org
