= George McNeil (artist) =

American abstract expressionist painter

- Born: February 22, 1908; New York, New York
- Died: January 10, 1995 (aged 86); New York, New York
- Known for: Painting, Educator
- Movement: Abstract expressionism
- Spouse: Dora Tamler (m. 1936)

George McNeil (February 22, 1908 – January 11, 1995) was an American abstract expressionist painter.

== Biography ==
George J. McNeil was born in Queens, New York, on February 22, 1908, the youngest child of an Irish Catholic working-class family. He attended Brooklyn Tech High School and the Pratt Institute, which he left before gaining his degree. He then copied works at the Metropolitan Museum of Art and attended classes at the Art Students League, where he studied with Jan Matulka in 1931–32. From 1932 to 1936 he studied with Hans Hofmann, becoming Hofmann's monitor (assistant) and teaching a class in collage. In 1936 he became one of the founding members of the American Abstract Artists group and from 1935 worked in the Mural and Easel section of the Works Progress Administration Federal Art Project. In 1936 he married fellow Hofmann student Dora Tamler, with whom he had two children, Helen and James. During the late 1930s he traveled to Mexico and in 1940–41 he visited Cuba. During World War II he served in the US Navy from 1943 to 1946. He also gained an Ed.D from Columbia University. From the late 1940s he was deeply involved with the abstract expressionist movement, also known as the New York School of painting. Apart from 1946–48, when he lived and taught in Laramie, Wyoming, and 1956–57 when he taught at the University of California, Berkeley, George McNeil lived from the late 1940s until his death in Brooklyn. From 1948 to 1962 he spent his summers in the art colony of Provincetown, Mass. He died in New York on January 11, 1995.

== Paintings ==
From the Cubist-influenced compositions of his earlier Hofmann student years, McNeil moved to full abstraction by 1936. His early 1950s paintings were "both abstract and expressionist" with an active surface " very moving, full of feeling, emotional" displaying the "painterly touch" that was identified with the artists exhibiting at the Charles Egan Gallery. His paintings remained fully abstract until the early 1960s when figures and faces began to appear in the abstract field, particularly in the "Dancer" and "Bather" series. McNeil commented to art historian Irving Sandler in 1968:

my work has always had not a human figure image, but it always had a figural image. There always seems to be some kind of center image ... that is figural, or imagistic ... [The figure] is not only found: it's completely abstract. You see this is the whole thing: I'm not a figure painter at all. I'm an abstract painter where I hope that bringing in the figure brings in certain human or psychological connotations or associations.

From 1980, dynamic situations such as discos, New York City, football, street life or graffiti activate his paintings. His work is characterized by profound attention to color and complex abstract volumes. In the 1980s his work enjoyed a renaissance of attention and influence. From 1970 to 1991 McNeil made lithographs that he printed on his own press or at the Tamarind Institute, Albuquerque, NM, where he was invited four times in the 1980s.

== Participation and affiliations ==
When George McNeil was a student with Hans Hofmann, he was friends with fellow students Giorgio Cavallon, Ray "Buddha" Kayser (Eames), Perle Fine, William Freed, Lee Krasner, Mercedes Matter, John Opper and Lillian Orlowsky, sharing a studio with Krasner and her then partner Igor Pantuhoff; through Krasner he met Jackson Pollock. He was also friendly with Willem de Kooning, and Esteban Vicente. After serving as Hans Hofmann's monitor and translator (as Krasner recalled, "I really got George's version of what he thought Hofmann had said to me,") McNeil broke with Hofmann over the question of the validity of full abstraction and identified with the American Abstract Artists such as Rosalind Bengelsdorf, Giorgio Cavallon, Ibram Lassaw and others, exhibiting with them from 1936. His work for the Mural Section of the WPA was supervised by Burgoyne Diller and he was active in the Artists Union. At the New York World's Fair in 1939 he was one of five abstract artists who exhibited; Stuart Davis appointed him an alternate juror for the Committee of Selection.

Early in 1936 a small group of 9 abstract artists met at Ibram Lassaw's studio at 232 Wooster Street, New York: Rosalind Bengelsdorf, Byron Browne, Gertrude Greene, Balcomb Greene, Harry Holtzman, George McNeil, Albert Swiden, Ibram Lassaw and Burgoyne Diller. Here they decided to form a cooperative exhibition society. This association was the first actual meeting of the American Abstract Artists, and they were its founders.

During the 1950s George McNeil was associated with the other artists who exhibited at the Egan Gallery such as Willem de Kooning, Philip Guston, Franz Kline and Jack Tworkov, with Kline a close friend.

From 1950 he was a member of The Club, the contemporary artists' club at 39 East 8th Street, NY, founded in 1948. He exhibited in the first Ninth Street Show (9th Street Exhibition) in 1951 chosen by fellow artists and exhibited in five of the subsequent New York Painting and Sculpture Annuals at the Stable Gallery through 1956. His work appeared regularly in the Whitney Museum Exhibition (Whitney Annual) from the early 1950s to the mid-1960s. From the late 1950s, together with Charles Cajori, Mercedes Matter and Sidney Geist, he took part in the life drawing sessions which gave rise to the New York Studio School. From the early 1960s " his transition to Figurative Expressionism ... made him an obvious precursor for the Neo-Expressionist movement of the 1980s." His highly successful exhibits at the Gruenebaum Gallery, 1981–87, brought his work together with that of many of his fellow gestural abstractionists and friends such as Janice Biala, James Brooks, Giorgio Cavallon, Elaine de Kooning, Sonia Gechtoff and Grace Hartigan.

In 1968 McNeil was the recipient of a Guggenheim Fellowship. Honored by the American Academy of Arts and Letters in 1982, he was elected a member of the American Institute of Arts and Letters in 1989.

== Teaching ==
From 1946 to 1948 McNeil taught at the University of Wyoming. In 1948 he became Director of the Evening Art School at the Pratt Institute, where he hired several of his fellow New York School artists such as Philip Guston, Adolph Gottlieb, Franz Kline, Reuben Nakian, Milton Resnick, Jack Tworkov and others. He taught undergraduate art history and then painting in the M.F.A. program to 1981, and taught at the New York Studio School 1966–81. His teaching influenced generations of young artists including Robert Wilson, Thomas Nozkowski and Maxine Yalovitz-Blankenship. He also taught at Skowhegan and the Vermont Studio School.
