= Art Front =

'Art Front'
- Cover of the first edition, November 1934
- Editor: Herman Baron; Stuart Davis; Joseph Solman; Clarence Weinstock
- Categories: art and artists
- Frequency: in theory, monthly
- Publisher: Artists' Committee of Action; Artists Union
- Founded: 1934
- First issue: November 1934
- Final issue Number: December 1937; 25 (volume 3, number 8)
- Country: United States
- Based in: New York
- Language: English

Art Front was an American art magazine published by the Artists Union in New York, initially as a joint project with the Artists' Committee of Action. Twenty-five issues appeared between November 1934 and December 1937.

== History ==
The Artists' Committee of Action formed early in 1934 to protest the destruction by Nelson Rockefeller of Diego Rivera's mural Man at the Crossroads; Hugo Gellert, Stuart Davis, Zoltan Hecht and Lionel S. Reiss were among the leaders. In the autumn of 1934 Herman Baron, the director of the American Contemporary Art gallery, was asked to join them; he offered to publish a bulletin for the group, similar to those he had previously issued through his gallery. Gellert suggested to the Artists Union that they should collaborate on the project. The name Art Front was proposed by Herbert Kruckman.

The first issue appeared in November 1934. Baron was managing editor, with an editorial committee of sixteen, eight from each of the partner groups. Apart from Gellert, Davis and Hecht, those from the Artists' Committee of Action were Hilda Abel, Harold Baumbach, Abraham Harriton, Rosa Pringle and Jennings Tofel, while those from the Artists Union were Boris Gorelick, Katherine Gridley, Ethel Olenikov, Robert Jonas, Kruckman, Michael Loew, C. Mactarian and Max Spivak. Although initially a joint project of the two groups, the magazine was by no later than April 1935 describing itself as the official publication of the Artists Union; the logo of the Artists' Committee remained on the masthead until January 1935.

Stuart Davis replaced Baron as editor at some time before November 1935; he was replaced by Joseph Solman in March 1936, followed by Clarence Weinstock in January 1937. The last issue was published in December of that year.

== Content ==
The magazine contained illustrations of works of art, announcements of events involving the Artists' Union, items of news, reviews of art publications and shows, and articles on a wide range of topics by figures of the New York arts world of the time. Among these were the artists Gwendolyn Bennett, Stuart Davis, Fritz Eichenberg, Philip Evergood, Balcomb Greene, Jacob Kainen, Chet La More, Fernand Léger, Louis Lozowick, Isamu Noguchi, James Porter, Joseph Solman, Moses and Raphael Soyer, Charmion von Wiegand, Lynd Ward and Max Weber. Among the other contributors were Irwin Edman, F.D. Klingender, Elizabeth McCausland, William Phillips, Samuel Putnam, Kenneth Rexroth, Harold Rosenberg and Meyer Schapiro.
