= Sara Carles Johns =

American artist and fashion illustrator

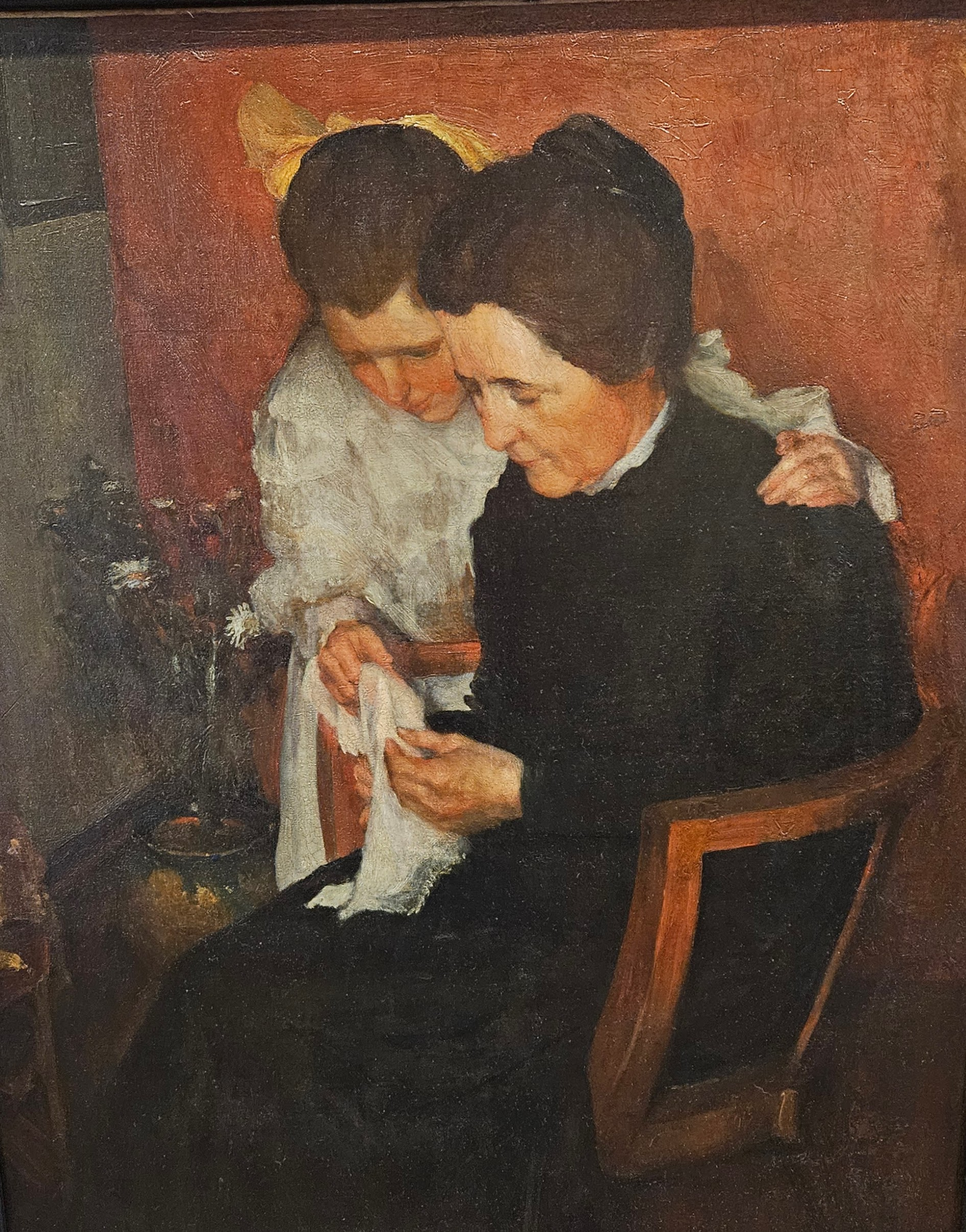
- Portrait of Carles (left) and her mother, c. 1907
- Born: January 1, 1894; Philadelphia, Pennsylvania, U.S.
- Died: August 21, 1965 (aged 71)
- Education: Pennsylvania Academy of the Fine Arts; Parsons School of Design
- Spouse: Craig Johns (m. 1926; died 1937)
- Children: 2
- Relatives: Arthur Beecher Carles (brother); Mercedes Matter (niece)

Sara Carles Johns (January 1, 1894 – August 21, 1965) was an American artist and fashion illustrator.

== Biography ==
Sara Carles attended the Pennsylvania Academy of the Fine Arts (PAFA) from 1916 to 1921. In May 1919, she won a Cresson Traveling Scholarship, enabling a summer and fall of travel in Europe in May 1919. In Paris, she took sketch classes at the Académie de la Grande Chaumière and embraced the work of Henri Matisse, Constantin Brâncuși, and Pierre Bonnard. She returned to Philadelphia in the fall of 1920.

Carles participated in the Exhibition of Paintings and Drawings Showing the Later Tendencies in Art shown at PAFA in 1921, along with Thomas Hart Benton, Joseph Stella and Alfred Stieglitz, contributing a work entitled Study. Her work was exhibited in PAFA's annual exhibitions: Nude in 1920, and In White in 1925. In 1923, one of her paintings was included in the 31 Exhibition at 1607 Walnut Street, Philadelphia. Others among the 31 artists included were Charles Demuth, Earl Horter, Carl Newman and Charles Sheeler. One of Carles' paintings from this period (ca. 1923), In White, was purchased by PAFA from its 1925 annual exhibition and is now in its permanent collection.

In the spring of 1925, Carles taught at the Barnes Foundation in Merion, Pennsylvania. She accompanied Mr. and Mrs. Albert Barnes along with a group of students in the summer/fall of that year as they toured the galleries and museums of Europe. Mr. Barnes organized a "class in the study of paintings" to be conducted by Carles in October 1925. He recommended that PAFA sponsor a similar class taught by Carles. In a letter to her at this time, he said "…you have any other painter in America skinned on what makes a painting a work of art…we're back of you with all powers."

In 1926, Carles married Percival Craig Johns, who had also trained as an artist at PAFA and worked as a freelance illustrator for N.W. Ayer & Son advertising company. They had two children, Craig and Adrian. After her husband died in 1937 at the age of 51, she was encouraged to move to New York City by her niece, Mercedes Matter (daughter of Arthur B. Carles), a painter and later founder of the New York Studio School of Drawing, Painting and Sculpture. With Mercedes, she traveled in the artistic circles of the New York School artists. She was friends with Elaine de Kooning and Willem de Kooning, Jackson Pollock, Lee Krasner and Hans Hoffman.

In 1939, her painting Madonna and Cloisters was exhibited in the 134th annual exhibition of paintings and sculpture at PAFA, under the name Sara Carles John (sic). Other artists represented included Isabel Bishop, Marsden Hartley, Reginald Marsh, Thomas Benton and Max Weber.

In order to support herself and her two children, Johns turned to fashion illustration. She studied graphic design at Parsons School of Design at The New School. There she met Alexey Brodovitch, the art director for Harper's Bazaar from 1934-1958, who was a class critic at Parsons from 1937-1938. Brodovitch began to commission work from her for Harper's Bazaar. Soon becoming a favorite of Brodovitch, she produced several covers as well as numerous spreads for the magazine over the next 20 years. She signed her work "SJohns". Johns also illustrated for Best & Co., Henri Bendel, Bergdorf Goodman, and through the Margaret Macy Advertising Agency, for several private clothing companies. At that time, many fashion illustrators became identified with certain brands; just as Rene Gruau's work was linked to Dior perfume or Crescendoe gloves, Johns' work was associated with Pringle of Scotland.

As a fashion illustrator, Johns became known for the use of collage, opaque gouache and a highly stylized approach. She specialized in a technique of fluid, Matisse-like drawings done in black wax pencil and overlaid with a collage effect of photographed fabrics or clear colored acetate. She drew from models, Lisa Fonssagrives, Judy Johnstone, Jackson Pollock's wife, Lee Krasner, and her daughter, Adrian. She would draw a series of sketches and, choosing the best one, would put it on a light box and trace over it, to further refine it.

Johns was a critic in fashion illustration at Parsons for the years 1944-45 and 1947-48. In 1948 she won the annual Fashion and Style Award from the Art Directors Club of New York for a cover illustration for Harper's Bazaar. Rosemary Torre, retired professor of fashion illustration at the Fashion Institute of Technology (FIT) wrote of Johns' work at Harper's Bazaar: "The artist Sara Johns brightened its pages for two decades with her concise, crisp, highly sophisticated drawings".. Johns' work is included in the Frances Neady Collection of original fashion illustrations at FIT.

Johns continued to illustrate and paint into the 1960s and died on August 21, 1965 in New York City. Her painting, In White was exhibited at PAFA in the 1996 show To Be Modern: American Encounters with Cezanne and Company.
