= Charles Cajori =

American painter

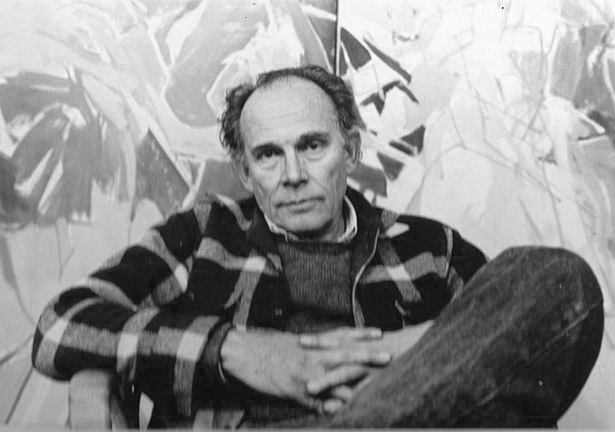
- Epistrophy II, 1998-2000, oil on linen, 60 x 44 inches Charles Cajori
- Born: Charles Cajori; March 9, 1921; Palo Alto, California
- Died: December 1, 2013 (aged 92); Watertown, Connecticut, United States
- Education: Cleveland Art School, Columbia University
- Known for: Painting, Drawing
- Movement: Abstract expressionism

Charles Florian Cajori (March 9, 1921 – December 1, 2013) was an abstract expressionist painter who, through his drawing, painting and teaching, made a significant contribution to the New York School of artists that emerged in the 1950s.

== Early life ==
Charles Cajori was born in Palo Alto, California, to Florian Cajori and Marion Huntington Haynes. They moved to Wayne, Pennsylvania, when Charles was one year old. Florian Cajori was a bio-chemist and taught in the medical school at the University of Pennsylvania. Marion was a pianist and educator who gave piano lessons and started a school inspired by John Dewey’s philosophy of inclusion and social reform.

Cajori went to school on the Main Line in the western suburbs of Philadelphia before enrolling in Colorado Springs Art Center in 1939 and the Cleveland Art School from 1940 to 1942. He was drafted in 1942, and spent four years in the US Air Force. Upon his discharge, he went to Columbia University on the G.I. Bill and studied there with Jack Heliker. He attended the Skowhegan School of Painting & Sculpture of in the summers of 1947 and 1948.

Early on Cajori discovered New York's downtown scene, and began attending the lively (and sometimes feisty) gatherings at the Cedar Tavern and the panels at the fabled Eighth Street Club. He became especially close to Willem de Kooning and Franz Kline, and in 1952 he joined with Lois Dodd, Angelo Ippolito, William King and Fred Mitchell to found the Tanager Gallery on East 10th St. The gallery was to become central to the lives of many of the contemporary working artists.

In 1950 he began his teaching career at Notre Dame University in Maryland, and by 1956 he was teaching at The Cooper Union. He was awarded a Fulbright Grant to Italy in 1959. After returning to the states, he resumed his life in New York. In 1959–60, he taught at the University of California at Berkeley, where he regularly joined Richard Diebenkorn and Elmer Bischoff in figure drawing sessions.

He met his wife, Barbara Grossman, at Cooper Union and they married in 1967. They had one child, Nicole Antonia born in 1969. In 1972 they moved to a rural farm house with land in Connecticut where they could both have large studios.

== Career ==
In the 1950s Cajori had solo exhibitions at the Tanager Gallery, Bertha Schaefer Gallery and the Oakland Art Museum. His work appeared in numerous group shows including annual and biennial shows at the Stable Gallery, the Whitney Museum, the Brooklyn Museum and the Corcoran Gallery of Art.

In 1964, joining with former students of Pratt Institute and several artists including Mercedes Matter, Sidney Geist, Georgio Spaventa, and Esteban Vicente, he founded the New York Studio School of Drawing, Painting and Sculpture. He was to teach at the school for the remainder of his active years. For 20 years he taught also at Queens College, and was a visiting artist at numerous other schools, including Yale University, Dartmouth College and Cornell University. He retired from full-time teaching in 1986 to devote his time to painting and drawing.

Cajori exhibited in New York City at the Howard Wise Gallery, Ingber Gallery, Lohin-Geduld Gallery, and at the Gross-McCleaf Gallery in Philadelphia as well as numerous colleges and universities, including Dartmouth College, American University, Cornell University, Wright State University, the New York Studio School, Central Connecticut State University, Cincinnati Art Academy, University of Texas at Austin, Bennington College, and the University of Washington at Seattle.

== Legacy ==
Cajori was recognized as an important second-generation Abstract Expressionist. His work was reviewed in all the major art journals and newspapers of the day.

The paintings of Cajori, with the exception of his early formative work, always revolved around the figure and the space. He keenly focused on the ideas about perception and the way we as humans are encompassed by the environment we found ourselves in. Thus the figure—always female, for Cajori—was activated by our vivid experience of occupying a section of life. All of his images were invented, using color and drawing to concretize this experience.

Cajori drew from the model all his life. He drew about once a week in his studio, hiring people with whom he often developed friendships. He exhibited those drawings along with the paintings and sometimes mixed-media inventions. He relished working large and could work on paintings over a long period of time, sometimes going back in to them long after declaring them "finished." He lived his life as an artist, preferring the studio to any other place.

In 2011, Cajori submitted a statement to E. Ashley Rooney for inclusion in his book on New England artists:

"First is the acknowledgment of chaos: its contradictions and wayward forces. Then the struggle for coherence. Not a coherence of illusion but one of time and space—of form. The mode of attack is improvisational, multileveled, and non-rational. The resulting structures may seem complete, but they contain a hint of another stage. New attacks are called for. Structures evolve endlessly."

Reviews of Cajori's work appeared in the New York Times, The New York Observer, Art News, Art in America, Arts Magazine, Art New England, Review, SoHo Weekly News, Art International, The New York Post, The Brooklyn Rail and artcritical.com, among many other publications.

Cajori's work is represented in numerous public collections, including the Metropolitan Museum of Art, the Hirshhorn Museum, the Whitney Museum, the Denver Art Museum, the Walker Art Center, the Weatherspoon Art Museum, the Arkansas Art Center, the Honolulu Art Academy and the National Academy of Design.

In addition to his Fulbright grant, Cajori was awarded a Distinction in the Arts by Yale University, a Longview Foundation Purchase Award, a Ford Foundation Purchase Award, several awards from the American Academy of Arts and Letters (the Jimmy Ernst Award, the Arts and Letters Award, and three Childe Hassam Purchase Awards), the Louis Comfort Tiffany Award, a National Endowment for the Arts Grant, several awards from the National Academy of Design (the Henry Ward Ranger Fund Purchase Award, the Ralph Fabri Prize, and four Benjamin Altman Prizes) and a Guggenheim Fellowship. In 1982 he was elected as an Academician of the National Academy of Design.
