= Herbert Matter =

American photographer and graphic designer (1907–1984)

- Matter in 1954
- Born: April 25, 1907; Engelberg, Obwalden, Switzerland
- Died: May 8, 1984 (aged 77); Southampton, New York, U.S.
- Education: École des Beaux-Arts (Geneva); Académie Moderne (Paris)
- Occupations: Graphic designer, photographer, professor
- Known for: Photomontage
- Spouse: Mercedes Matter (m. 1939)
- Relatives: Arthur Beecher Carles (father-in-law); Jordan Matter (grandson); Salish Matter (great granddaughter)
- Awards: AIGA medal (1983)

Herbert Robert Matter (April 25, 1907 – May 8, 1984) was a Swiss-born American photographer and graphic designer known for his pioneering use of photomontage in commercial art. Matter's innovative and experimental work helped shape the vocabulary of 20th-century graphic design.

== Biography ==
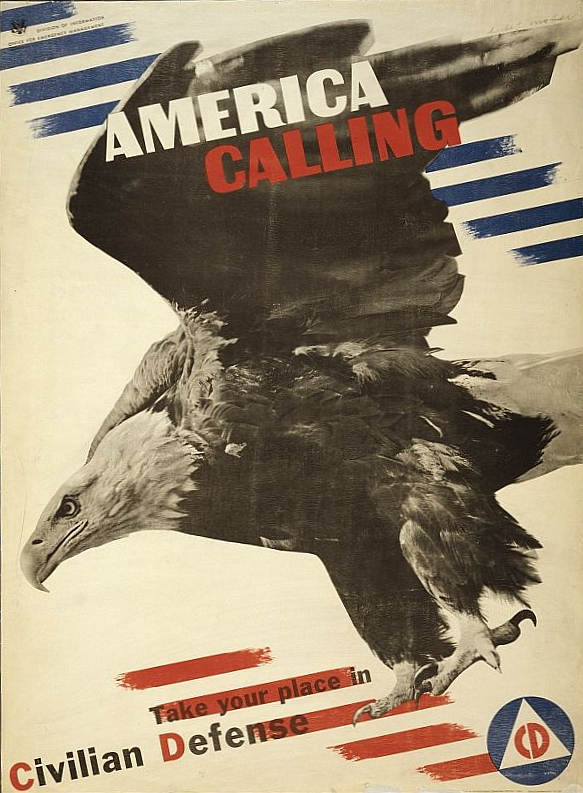
World War II-era poster for United States Civil Defense by Matter

Matter was born in Engelberg, Switzerland, to Robert Anton Matter (1879–1959) and Ida Anna Klara Matter (née Odermatt) (1882–1966). Matter studied painting at the École des Beaux-Arts in Geneva and at the Académie Moderne in Paris under the tutalge of Fernand Léger and Amédée Ozenfant. He worked with Adolphe Mouron Cassandre, Le Corbusier and Deberny & Peignot. In 1932, he returned to Zurich, where he designed posters for the Swiss National Tourist Office and Swiss resorts. The travel posters won instant international acclaim for his pioneering use of photomontage combined with typeface.

Matter went to the United States in 1936 and was hired by legendary art director Alexey Brodovitch. Work for Harper's Bazaar, Vogue and other magazines followed. In the 1940s, photographers, including Irving Penn, at Vogue's studios at 480 Lexington Avenue often used them for shooting the advertising work commissioned by outside clients. The practice was at first tolerated, but by 1950 it was banned on the grounds that it "has interfered with our own interests and has been a severe handicap to our editorial operations". In response, Matter and three other Condé Nast photographers—Serge Balkin, Constantin Joffé and Geoffrey Baker—left to establish Studio Enterprises Inc. in the former House & Garden studio on 37th Street (Penn stayed on but also left in 1952).

From 1946 to 1966, Matter was design consultant with Knoll Associates. He worked closely with Charles and Ray Eames. From 1952 to 1976, he was professor of photography at Yale University and from 1958 to 1968 he served as design consultant to the Solomon R. Guggenheim Museum in New York and the Museum of Fine Arts in Houston. He was elected to the New York Art Director's Club Hall of Fame in 1977, received a Guggenheim Fellowship in photography in 1980 and the 1983 AIGA medal from the American Institute of Graphic Arts. It was during this period that he was commissioned by Patrick B. McGinnis to design the famous livery of the New York, New Haven and Hartford Railroad as well as a new herald for the Boston and Maine Railroad.

As a photographer, Matter won acclaim for his purely visual approach. A master technician, he used every method available to achieve his vision of light, form and texture. Manipulation of the negative, retouching, cropping, enlarging and light drawing are some of the techniques he used to achieve the fresh form he sought in his still lifes, landscapes, nudes and portraits. As a filmmaker, he directed two films on his friend Alexander Calder: Sculptures and Constructions in 1944 and Works of Calder (with music by John Cage) for the Museum of Modern Art in 1950.

Logos of the New York, New Haven and Hartford Railroad (left) and the Boston and Maine Railroad by Matter

Matter and his wife, Mercedes, included as close friends painters Jackson Pollock and Willem de Kooning, fellow Swiss photographer Robert Frank, and Swiss sculptor and painter Alberto Giacometti. Matter's wife was the daughter of the American modernist painter Arthur Beecher Carles, and was herself the chief founder of the New York Studio School. Alex Matter, son of Herbert and Mercedes, was the filmmaker of The Drifter (1966). Herbert Matter's grandson is the American YouTuber, photographer, and filmmaker Jordan Matter.

"The absence of pomposity was characteristic of this guy", said another designer, Paul Rand, about Matter. His creative life was devoted to narrowing the gap between so-called fine and applied arts. Matter died on May 8, 1984, in Southampton, New York.

== Bibliography ==
- "Herbert Matter" in German, French and Italian in the online Historical Dictionary of Switzerland.
- Herbert Matter: Modernist Photography and Graphic Design (paperback) by Jeffrey Head. Design and typesetting by John Hill. Exhibition catalog published by Stanford University Libraries 2005.
- "History of Writing Non-Alphabetic Systems of Writing", Baseline International Typographics Magazine, no. 41, 2003, pp. 33–36 by Jeffrey Head
- "Herbert Matter: The Art of Photo-Graphics" by Kerry William Purcell, Baseline, No. 49, 2006
- "The Crafty Linotyper" (extract), by Kerry William Purcell. Eye, No. 55, 2005
- The Visual Language of Herbert Matter (2009), documentary film on the life and work of Matter
