= Vera White (artist) =

American artist

Vera McEntire White (1888–1966) was an American artist, art collector, and philanthropist. Her work is included in the collections of the Whitney Museum of American Art and the Philadelphia Museum of Art.

== Artist and art collector ==
In 1915 Vera McEntire married Samuel S. White, and the two went on to become art collectors and philanthropists to the art community. Their gift to the Philadelphia Art museum, gathered over 50 years, is known as the Samuel S. White III and Vera White Collection.

Arthur Beecher Carles painted a portrait of White in 1922. White was photographed by Man Ray in the early 1930s.^{: 74, 76}

White completed some paintings in oil, but she preferred to work in watercolors. She began showing her work in 1929, and held exhibitions in New York, London, Philadelphia, and Paris. Curator Henry G. Gardiner has suggested that White's own career as an artist explains their collection's interest in watercolors. Her work "develops in parallel form to the collection and to the influences around her."^{: 7}
