= Jordan Matter =

American photographer and internet celebrity (born 1966)

- Born: October 6, 1966 (age 60); New York City, U.S.
- Occupations: YouTuber; photographer
- Spouse: Lauren Matter
- Children: 2, including Salish
- Relatives: Herbert Matter (grandfather); Mercedes Matter (grandmother); Arthur Beecher Carles (great-grandfather)

Instagram information
- Page: Jordan Matter
- Years active: 2011–present
- Followers: 2.4 million

TikTok information
- Page: Jordan Matter
- Followers: 7.7 million

YouTube information
- Channel: Jordan Matter
- Years active: 2006–present
- Genres: Photography, challenges
- Subscribers: 38.3 million
- Views: 16 billion
- Last updated: October 18, 2026
- Website: www.jordanmatter.com

Jordan Matter (born October 6, 1966) is an American YouTuber and photographer. He produces content on the YouTube platform, primarily focusing on photography, dance, and vlogs. As of October 2026, Matter has over 38.3 million subscribers and over 16 billion views on his YouTube channel.

== Early life ==
Although Matter came from an artistic family—Herbert Matter, his grandfather, worked as a photographer, while his father worked as a filmmaker—he did not develop an interest in photography until after college.

== Career ==
=== YouTube career ===
Matter started his YouTube channel, "Jordan Matter," in 2006. He had 1.4 million subscribers in November 2018, which had increased to 13 million by October 2022. As of October 2026, his channel has over 38.3 million subscribers and more than 16 billion views. His online success has been attributed to his "10-Minute Photo Challenge" series, which he began filming during his photoshoots for his 2018 book, Born to Dance.

Matter has collaborated with several individuals and celebrities within the photography and dance world, including famous dancers like Maddie Ziegler and Jojo Siwa. He has also collaborated with Nidal Wonder and The Hype House.

Matter has received the Silver Play Button and Gold Play Button and the Diamond Creator Award awards from YouTube for surpassing 100,000, 1 million and 10 million subscribers.

=== Photography ===
Matter first gained attention while working on his dance photography series, "Dancers Among Us", in which he photographed professional dancers striking poses and performing in public locations. He began shooting for the series in 2014, after meeting Jeffrey Smith of the Paul Taylor Dance Company. Matter's photographs were published in 2012 in a book of the same name.

In 2013, following the completion of his Dancers Among Us series, Matter began photographing athletes in public, in a series titled "Athletes Among Us".

Two of Matter's photography books, Dancers Among Us (2012), and Born to Dance (2018), were New York Times Bestsellers.

An exhibit of his photos, entitled Dancers Among Us: Photographs by Jordan Matter, was on display at the Savina Museum of Contemporary Art in Seoul in 2013 and the Hudson River Museum in 2015.

=== Sincerely Yours ===
In September 2025, Jordan Matter launched the skincare brand Sincerely Yours with his daughter, Salish Matter, and beauty executive Julia Straus. Developed with dermatologists Mara Weinstein Velez, Robin Schaffran, and Longchuan Huang, the brand is aimed at teenagers with sensitive or developing skin and it is debuted exclusively at Sephora in the United States.

== Books ==
- Dancers Among Us (2012)
- Dancers After Dark
- Born to Dance (2018)

== Personal life ==
Matter lives in California with his wife, Lauren. They have two children, Hudson (born 2005) and Salish (born 2009), both of whom have their own channels with 2.22 million and 4.45 million subscribers respectively as of October 2026, whose videos he often appears in.
