= Byron Browne (artist) =

American artist (1907–1961)

- Born: George Byron Browne; June 26, 1907; Yonkers, New York
- Died: December 25, 1961 (aged 54); New York, New York
- Known for: Painting
- Movement: Abstract Art
- Spouse: Rosalind Bengelsdorf (m. 1940)

Byron Browne (1907–1961) was an American painter and founding member of the American Abstract Artists.

== Biography ==
Browne was born on June 26, 1907, in Yonkers, New York. He studied at the National Academy of Design from 1925 to 1928 with many well known artists including Charles Courtney Curran, Ivan Olinsky, Alice Murphy and Robert Aitkin. He was a member of the Artists Union. In 1935 Browne studied with the abstract expressionist painter and teacher Hans Hofmann. He created murals under the auspices of the Works Progress Administration for the Chronic Disease Hospital and the 1939 New York World's Fair. In 1940 he married fellow artist Rosalind Bengelsdorf. He taught painting at the Art Students League of New York from 1948 through 1959 and went on to teach at New York University. Near the end of his life Browne was very active in the Provincetown, Massachusetts art colony. He died on December 25, 1961, in New York City.

Browne's work is included in the collections of the Art Institute of Chicago, the Museum of Modern Art, the Philadelphia Museum of Art, the Smithsonian American Art Museum, and the Whitney Museum of American Art.

In 1936 he was one of the founding members of the American Abstract Artists. Rosalind Bengelsdorf gives an account of the founding of American Abstract Artists as a "small group of abstract artists who met at Ibram Lassaw's studio at 232 Wooster Street, New York, early in 1936. The gathering consisted roughly of Byron Browne, Gertrude and Balcomb Greene, Harry Holtzman, George McNeil, Albert Swiden, Lassaw, Burgoyne Diller, and myself. It was on this occasion we decided to form a cooperative exhibition society. Therefore this association became the first actual meeting of the American Abstract Artists, and we were, in fact, its founders."
