= Boris Gorelick =

American lithographer

Boris Gorelick (June 24, 1911-July 27, 1984) was an American printmaker and background artist.

== Biography ==
Gorelick was born in Russia and emigrated to the United States when he was a baby. When he was 10 years old, Gorelick attended drawing classes in Brooklyn taught by Peter Krasnow and was recognized for his ability to draw portraits. He studied art at the National Academy of Design, where he was a classmate of Lee Krasner, Bryon Browne, and Igor Pantuhoff.

Gorelick was a member of the Communist Party and helped to found the Artists Union with other Party members. He also served on the executive committee of the Artists' Congress Against War and Fascism in 1935. Gorelick was known primarily for his political prints, which incorporated Surrealist techniques. Many of his works reflected his left-wing politics, depicting workers and industrial scenes.

Gorelick later worked as a background artist for Warner Bros. In 1973, he worked on the animation for Star Trek: The Animated Series. In addition, he taught art classes for high school students at the Otis Art Institute.
