= Chet La More =

American artist

Chet Harmon La More
- Born: 1908; Dane County, Wisconsin
- Died: 1980 (aged 71–72); Ann Arbor, Michigan
- Known for: painter, printmaker, sculptor

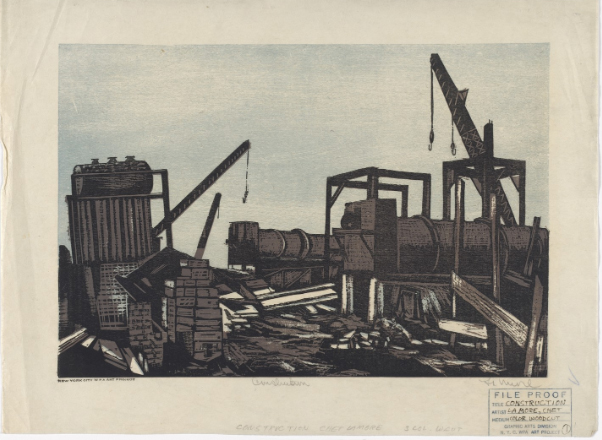
Construction, c. 1935–43

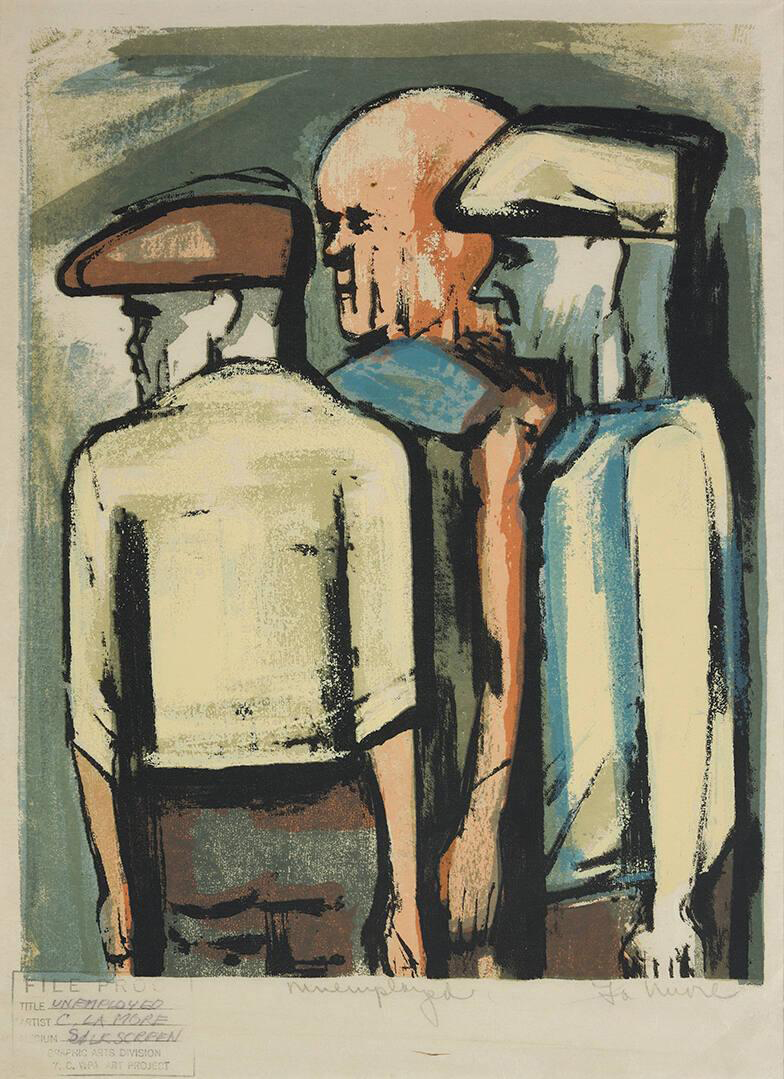
Unemployed, 1938

Chet La More (1908–1980) was an American artist.

== Biography ==
La More was born in 1908 in Dane County, Wisconsin. He studied at the Layton School of Art in Milwaukee and the University of Wisconsin. For a time he was the editor of the Baltimore Art Association magazine. In the 1930s he was an artist in the Works Progress Administration's Federal Art Project Graphic Arts Project. He was also a member of the National Coordinating Committee of the Artists Union.

In 1942, La More was located in Buffalo where he taught at the University of Buffalo. He then served in the armed forces in Europe during World War II. He returned to teaching at Buffalo before locating to Ann Arbor to teach at the University of Michigan in 1947. He taught at Michigan until his retirement in 1974.

La More's work was included in the 1944 Dallas Museum of Art exhibition of the National Serigraph Society.

La More died in 1980 in Ann Arbor, Michigan.

La More's work is in the collections of the Albright–Knox Art Gallery, the Art Institute of Chicago, the Metropolitan Museum of Art, the Museum of Modern Art, the National Gallery of Art, and the Smithsonian American Art Museum.
