= Phil Bard =

American artist and activist (1912–1966)

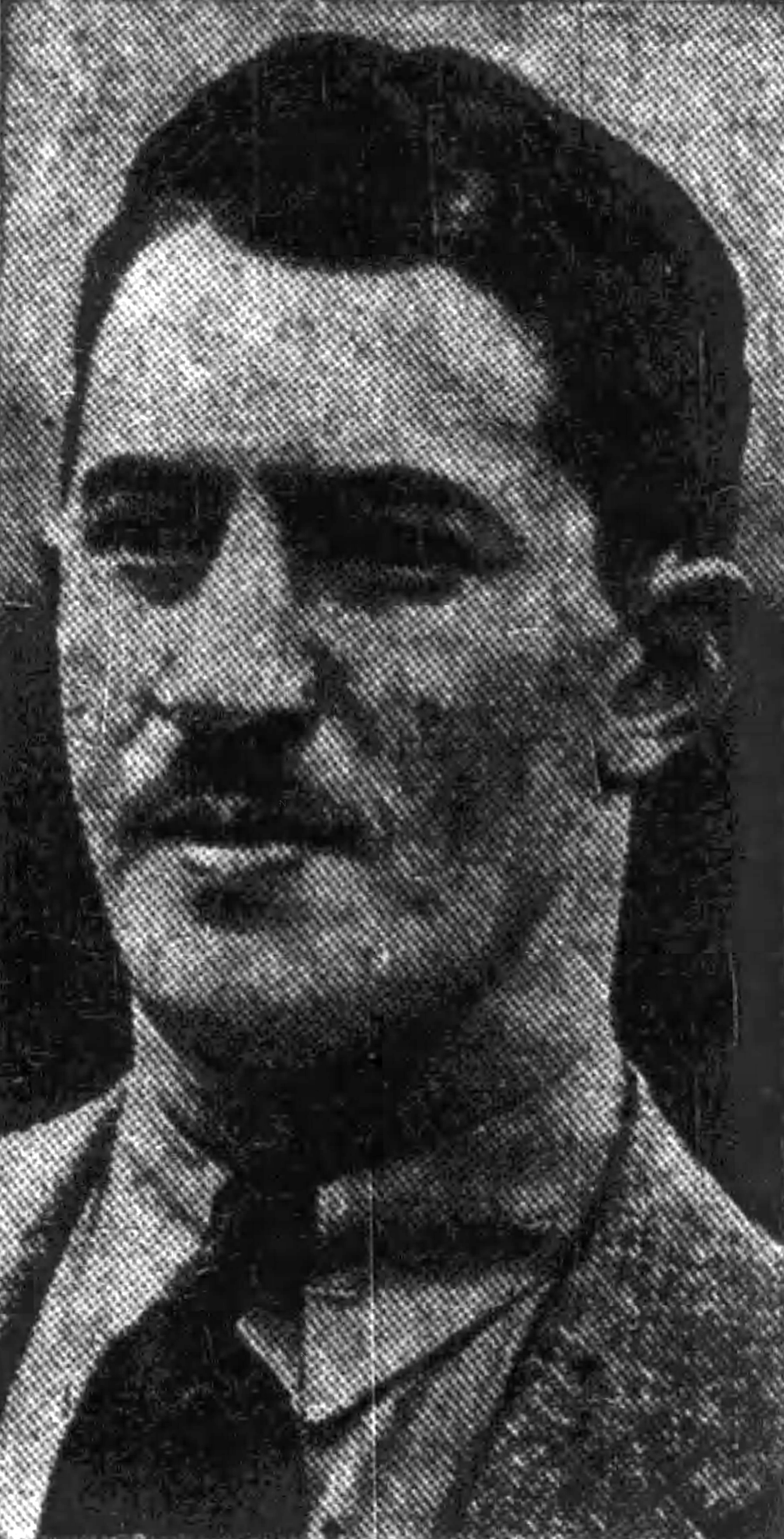
Bard c. 1937

Phil Bard (February 14, 1912 – March 12, 1966) was an American artist and Communist Party organizer.

== Biography ==
Bard was employed as a cartoonist at Krazy Kat Studio before joining the staff of New Masses magazine in 1930. Bard worked for the Communist Party as an organizer in the Ohio National Guard's summer camp, attempting to spread anti-military leaflets. Bard was one of five members on the National Secretariat of the John Reed Club in 1934. Under the influence of the John Reed Club and members like Hugo Gellert, Bard began to work with murals in addition to his drawings. While representing the Club, he participated in the protests against the removal of Diego Rivera's Man at the Crossroads from Rockefeller Center, though he was critical of Rivera's politics. Bard was also a founding member of the Artists' Union in 1934. In 1936 he was active in the American League Against War and Fascism, contributing a page to an illustrated calendar that featured 12 drawings by left-wing artists.

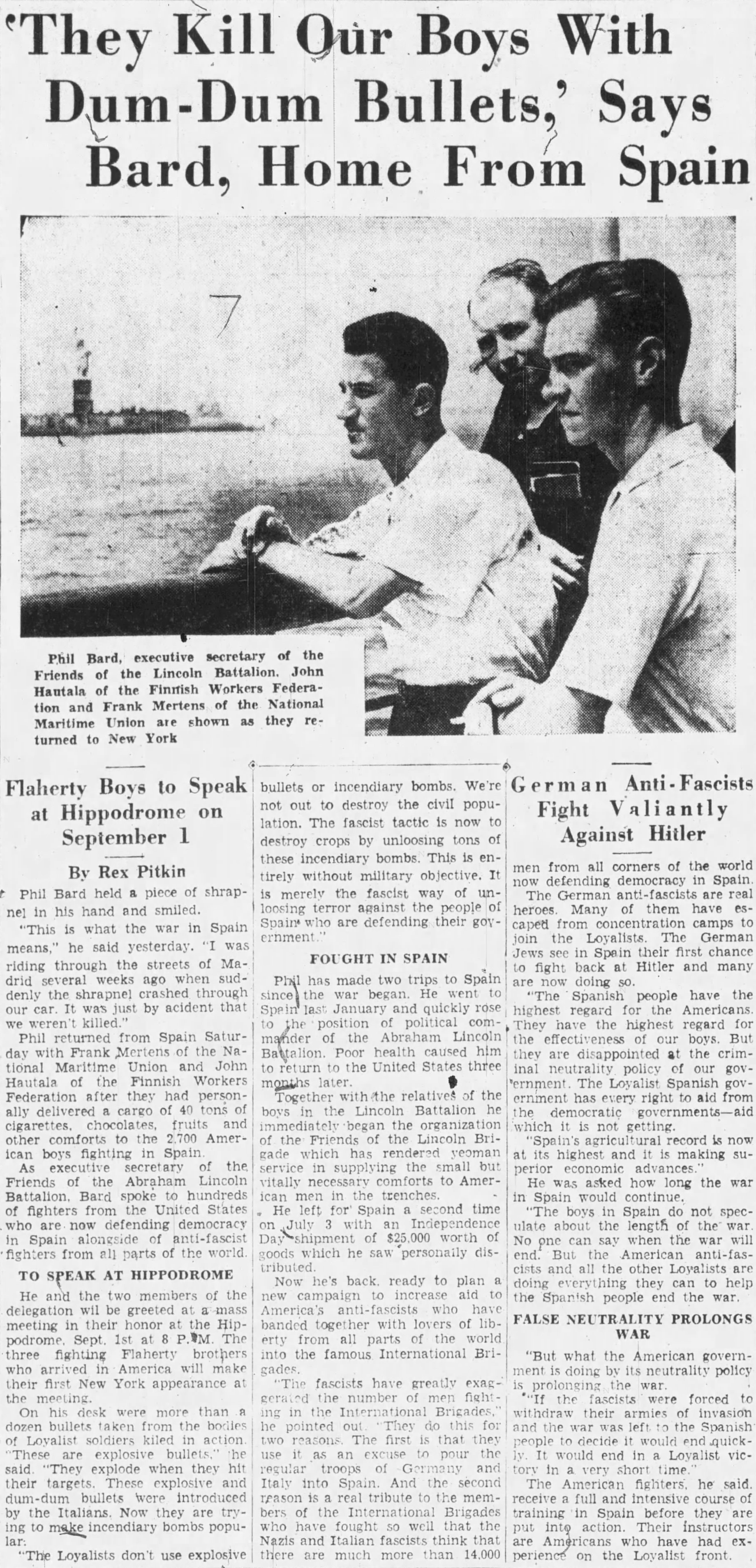
Article published in the Daily Worker detailing Bard's time in Spain, August 24, 1937

During the Spanish Civil War, Bard joined the Abraham Lincoln Brigade, serving as the Lincoln Battalion's political commissar, but left the military because of ill health. He continued to aid the loyalists in Spain by serving as the executive secretary of the Friends of the Abraham Lincoln Brigade. Morris Cohen wrote that a speech by Bard at a Bronx County Communist Party meeting inspired him to join the International Brigades in 1937.

Using his background in art, he worked as the advertising manager for the Daily Worker, where he attracted controversy in 1950 for refusing to publish advertisements for a film criticizing the trial of Cardinal Midszenty. Bard became paralyzed on his right side after an illness but he trained himself to draw with his left hand. Bard had his first solo exhibition of drawings in 1955 at ACA Galleries At this time, his work still reflected his left-wing sympathies, depicting human figures "shrunken in body and spirit" in "a world on the point of crumbling".

Beyond his political activities and art, Bard continued to support himself as a comic artist, drawing art for the comic book Minute-Man and working on other Fawcett books such as Captain Marvel Jr. due to his fast drawing speed, before leaving Fawcett in 1944; The Who's Who of American Comic Books lists Bard as an inker on Captain America stories in 1942 and Newsboy Legion and Sandman comics for DC before leaving the industry. He was the author of one play, an allegorical story of a blind veteran, called Ninth Month Midnight. It was performed in 1949 by the Abbe Practical Workshop. Bard died on March 12, 1966, at the Jewish Chronic Disease Hospital in Brooklyn.
