= Morris Blackburn =

American painter

Morris Atkinson Blackburn (1902–1979) was a printmaker, muralist, and teacher. He is considered to be a pioneer of silkscreen printing.

Blackburn's work is in the collections of the Smithsonian American Art Museum, the National Gallery of Art, the Metropolitan Museum of Art, the British Museum, and the Philadelphia Museum of Art. His papers are held by the Pennsylvania Academy of the Fine Arts.

== Early life and education ==
Blackburn was born in Philadelphia in 1902.

He studied architectural drawing at the Philadelphia Trade School in 1918 after which he worked at the Hog Island shipbuilding yard.

Blackburn studied art at the Graphic Sketch Club, now the Samuel S. Fleisher Art Memorial, in 1922. He attended the Pennsylvania Academy of Fine Arts from 1925 to 1929. While at PAFA, he studied sketching under Arthur Carles, painting under Henry McCarter, and drawing under Daniel Garber. He was taught privately by Arthur Beecher Carles.

== Career ==
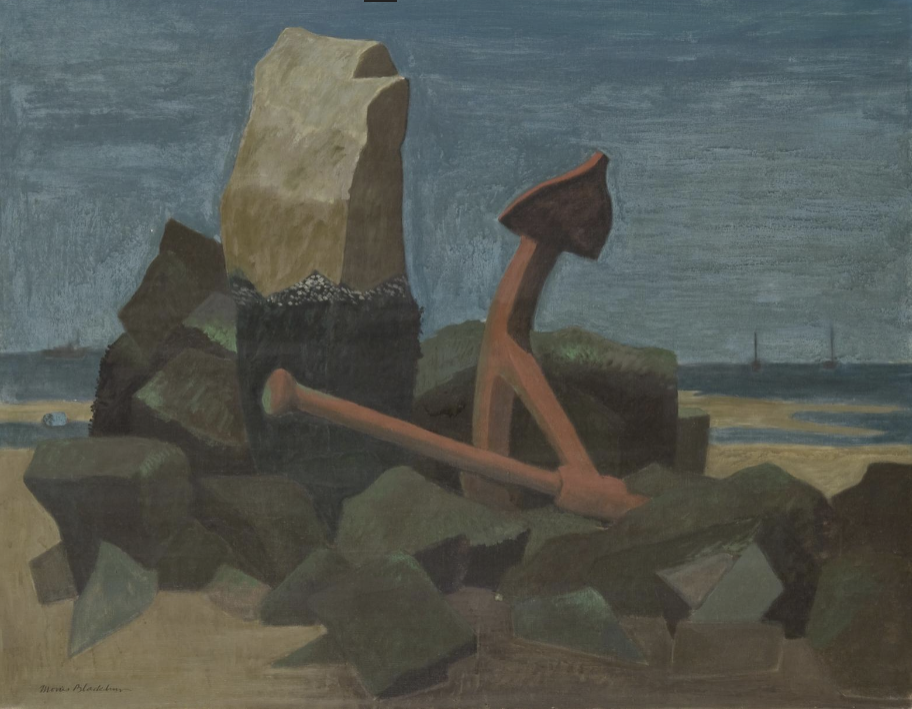
Rock and Anchor by Morris Blackburn

=== Artistic career ===
Blackburn was a painter and graphic designer. Much of his work featured scenes of Philadelphia, New Jersey, and Taos, New Mexico.

He was an early adopter of the silkscreen process and often used it in his work.

Blackburn created two murals for the Works Progress Administration's Public Works Art Project in the mid-1930s. The murals were located at Mastbaum Vocational School and Haverford High School.

=== Teaching career ===
Blackburn began teaching at the Pennsylvania Museum School of Industrial Art, now the University of the Arts, in 1932.

He taught at various art schools, including the Tyler School of Art, from 1948 to 1952 and joined the faculty of the Pennsylvania Academy of Fine Arts in 1952.

== Collections ==
Works by Blackburn are kept in several museum collections:

- Smithsonian American Art Museum
- National Gallery of Art
- Metropolitan Museum of Art
- British Museum
- Philadelphia Museum of Art
