= Harold Rosenberg =

American writer, educator and philosopher (1906–1978)

- Born: February 2, 1906; New York City, New York, U.S.
- Died: July 11, 1978 (aged 72); Springs, New York, U.S.
- Education: City College of New York; Brooklyn Law School
- Occupations: Art critic; writer; philosopher

Harold Rosenberg (February 2, 1906 – July 11, 1978) was an American writer, educator, philosopher and art critic. He coined the term Action Painting in 1952 for what was later to be known as abstract expressionism. Rosenberg is best known for his art criticism. From 1962 until his death, he was the art critic of The New Yorker.

== Background ==
Harold Rosenberg was born on February 2, 1906, in Brooklyn, New York. After studying at the City College of New York from 1923 to 1924, he received his LL.B. from Brooklyn Law School (then a unit of St. Lawrence University) in 1927. Later, he often said he was "educated on the steps of the New York Public Library." Rosenberg embraced a bohemian lifestyle upon contracting osteomyelitis shortly after attaining his degree; the condition ultimately necessitated his use of a cane for the rest of his life.

== Career ==
Throughout the 1930s, Rosenberg embraced Marxism and contributed to such publications as Partisan Review, The New Masses, Poetry and Art Front, which he briefly edited.

From 1938 to 1942 he was art editor for the American Guide Series produced by the Works Progress Administration. During this period, he "slowly ... converted to an anti-communist and democratic stance on art toward focusing on individual creativity and the independence of the artist."

For much of World War II, he was deputy chief of the domestic radio bureau in the Office of War Information and a consultant for the Treasury Department from 1945 to 1946.

From 1946, Rosenberg served as a program consultant for the Ad Council until 1973. Following several lectureships and visiting appointments at the New School for Social Research (1953-1959), Princeton University (1963) and Southern Illinois University Carbondale (1965), he became professor of social thought in the art department of the University of Chicago from 1966 until his death.

== Personal life and death ==
Harold Rosenberg died age 72 on July 11, 1978, at his summer home in Springs, New York, from complications of a stroke and pneumonia.

== Works ==
Rosenberg wrote several books on art theory, and monographs on Willem de Kooning, Saul Steinberg, and Arshile Gorky. A Marxian cultural critic, Rosenberg's books and essays probed the ways in which evolving trends in painting, literature, politics, and popular culture disguised hidden agendas or mere hollowness.

=== Books ===
- Trance Above the Streets (1942) (poems)
- The Tradition of the New (1959)
- Arshile Gorky: The Man, the Time, the Idea (1962)
- The Anxious Object (1964)
- Artworks and Packages (1969)
- Act and the Actor (1970)
- The De-definition of Art (1972)
- Discovering the Present (1973)
- Art on the Edge (1975)
- The Case of the Baffled Radical (1976)
- Art and Other Serious Matters (1978)

=== Essays ===
One of Rosenberg's most often cited essays is "The Herd of Independent Minds," where he analyzes the trivialization of personal experience inherent both in mass culture-making and superficial political commitment in the arts. In this work, Rosenberg exposes political posturing in both the mass media and among artistic elites (for instance, he claims the so-called socially responsible poetry of Stephen Spender was actually an avoidance of responsibility masquerading as "responsible poetry.") Rosenberg deplored the attempts at commercialization of authentic experience through techniques of psychological manipulation available to mass media producers. He wrote mockingly of mass culture's efforts to consolidate and control the intricacies of human needs:

The more exactly he grasps, whether by instinct or through study, the existing element of sameness in people, the more successful is the mass-culture maker. Indeed, so deeply is he committed to the concept that men are alike that he may even fancy that there exists a kind of human dead center in which everyone is identical with everyone else, and that if he can hit that psychic bull's eye he can make all mankind twitch at once.

=== Action painting ===
Rosenberg first used the term "action painting" in the essay "American Action Painters," published in the December 1952 issue of ARTnews. (The essay was reprinted in Rosenberg's book The Tradition of the New in 1959.)

"The Bird for Every Bird"

I said to him: Why do you delay?
He said: Because of what you desire.
And I: You command my desires...
So sweetly the argument went on from year to year.

Meanwhile it was raining blood and rage.
The two Marquis, the white and the black
Were crying like gulls out of my throat—
My throat uncaring as the summer sky—

All to avenge themselves upon the dust.
Leopards drowsed on the diving boards.
I knew who had sent them in those green cases.
Who doesn’t lose his mind will receive like me That wire in my neck up to the ear.

— Harold Rosenberg

Rosenberg modeled the term "action painting" on his intimate knowledge of Willem de Kooning's working process. His essay, "The American Action Painters," brought into focus the paramount concern of de Kooning, Pollock, and Kline in particular, with the act of painting. Lee Krasner, Elaine de Kooning, and Joan Mitchell might also have been included, though their work was not then discussed in this connection. For the action painter the canvas was not a representation but an extension of the mind itself, in which the artist thought by changing the surface with his or her brush. Rosenberg saw the artist's task as a heroic exploration of the most profound issues of personal identity and experience in relation to the large questions of the human condition.

=== "The Bird for Every Bird" ===
Rosenberg wrote "The Bird for Every Bird", a brief poem of three stanzas and thirteen lines with violent imagery. The poem was significant for its association with an early artwork by the abstract expressionist artist Robert Motherwell which later inspired the Elegies to the Spanish Republic, one of the artists' longest running and best known series of works.

During 1947–48, Rosenberg collaborated with Motherwell and others to produce Possibilities, an art review. During the latter year Motherwell created an image incorporating Rosenberg's poem, meant for inclusion in the review's second issue. The top half was a handwritten, stylized rendering of the poem's final three lines, and the bottom half was a visual element consisting of roughly rendered black ovoid and rectangular forms against a white background. The stark image was meant to "illustrate" the violence of the poem in an abstract, non-literal way; Motherwell therefore preferred the term "illumination". The second issue of Possibilities did not materialize, and Motherwell placed the image in storage. He rediscovered it roughly one year later and decided to rework its basic elements. This led to the Elegies to the Spanish Republic, a series of artworks which Motherwell continued to produce for the rest of his life, using the same visual motif of rough ovoid and rectangular forms. Several years later Motherwell retroactively titled the original image Elegy to the Spanish Republic No. 1, recognizing it as the series' starting point.

"The Bird for Every Bird" has been compared to "The Men That Are Falling" by Wallace Stevens, a similar work which lamented the deaths of Spanish Republican fighters. It has been suggested that Rosenberg's poem and Motherwell's artworks were inspired in part by Stevens' poem, though the latter two wanted to express lamentation for the Spanish Republic and the associated violent themes of the Spanish Civil War in more abstract, non-literal ways, leaving interpretations open.

== Legacy ==
Rosenberg is also the subject of a painting by Elaine de Kooning.

Along with Clement Greenberg and Leo Steinberg, he was identified in Tom Wolfe's 1975 book The Painted Word as one of the three figures of "Cultureburg", so named for the enormous degree of influence their criticism exerted over the world of modern art.

Saul Bellow wrote a fictional portrait of Rosenberg in his short story "What Kind of Day Did You Have?".

He was a mentor to the critic, essayist, reporter, and novelist Renata Adler.

In 1987, Alan M. Wald quotes Rosenberg's 1965 "Death in the Wilderness" at the opening of his introductory chapter entitled "Political Amnesia" in his book The New York Intellectuals.
