= The Angry Birds Movie 3 =

Upcoming film by John Rice

- Theatrical release poster
- Directed by: John Rice
- Screenplay by: Thurop Van Orman
- Based on: Angry Birds by Rovio Entertainment
- Produced by: John Cohen; Dan Chuba; Carla Connor; Namit Malhotra
- Starring: Jason Sudeikis; Josh Gad; Emma Myers; Rachel Bloom; Walker Scobell; Danny McBride; Marcello Hernández; Tim Robinson; Anna Cathcart; Maitreyi Ramakrishnan; Nikki Glaser; Psalm West; MrBeast; Salish Matter; Sam Richardson; James Austin Johnson; Lily James; Keke Palmer
- Edited by: Sarah K. Reimers
- Music by: Heitor Pereira
- Production company: Prime Focus Studios
- Distributed by: Paramount Pictures
- Release date: December 23, 2026
- Running time: 96 minutes
- Language: English

The Angry Birds Movie 3 is an upcoming animated comedy film based on the Angry Birds video game series. It is the sequel to The Angry Birds Movie 2 (2019) and the third installment in the Angry Birds film series. Directed by John Rice and written by Thurop Van Orman, it stars Jason Sudeikis, Josh Gad, Rachel Bloom, and Danny McBride reprising their roles from the previous films, with Emma Myers, Walker Scobell, Marcello Hernández, Tim Robinson, Anna Cathcart, Maitreyi Ramakrishnan, Nikki Glaser, MrBeast, Salish Matter, Psalm West, Sam Richardson, James Austin Johnson, Lily James, and Keke Palmer joining the cast.

A third Angry Birds film was reported to be in development by Sony Pictures in 2020. The film was announced and commenced production, including voice-over recording, in 2024, while Paramount Pictures was revealed to have replaced Sony the following year. Prime Focus Studios produces, while DNEG provides animation services.

The Angry Birds Movie 3 is scheduled to be released on December 23, 2026.

== Premise ==
Red and Silver are now parents of three children, and must balance their family life with saving their world from extinction.

== Voice cast ==
- Jason Sudeikis as Red
- Josh Gad as Chuck
- Emma Myers as June, a creative, independent teenager and the only daughter of Red and Silver
- Rachel Bloom as Silver, Red's wife and Chuck's younger sister
- Walker Scobell as Glider, an adventurous teenager and the eldest son of Red and Silver
- Danny McBride as Bomb
- Tim Robinson as Porkchop, a muscular pig
- Psalm West as Olly, Red and Silver's hatchling son
- James Austin Johnson as Fuzzy, Red and Silver's pet spider
- Anthony Padilla as Hal
- Ian Hecox as Bubbles

Keke Palmer, Lily James, Sam Richardson, Maitreyi Ramakrishnan, Nikki Glaser, Marcello Hernandez, Anna Cathcart, MrBeast, and Salish Matter have been cast in undisclosed roles.

== Production ==
=== Development ===
A third Angry Birds film was reported to be in development by Geeks WorldWide on April 30, 2020. Sony Pictures was said to be producing, with production planned for 2021.

Rovio Entertainment officially announced that the third film was in production on June 6, 2024, and would produce with their new parent company Sega alongside Prime Focus Studios, while One Cool Films, Flywheel Entertainment, and Dentsu Entertainment would also be involved, with DNEG Animation partnering for animation services. John Rice was attached to direct with Thurop Van Orman writing the screenplay—after they previously co-directed and directed The Angry Birds Movie 2 (2019), respectively—and John Cohen, Dentsu's Dan Chuba, and Prime Focus' Carla Connor and Namit Malhotra producing.

On April 8, 2025, Paramount Pictures acquired the film's distribution rights from Sony; this transition followed Paramount's successful collaboration with Sega on the Sonic the Hedgehog film series. On July 18, Allied Gaming & Entertainment joined as a financier through Flywheel.

=== Casting and recording ===
Alongside the film's announcement in June 2024, Jason Sudeikis and Josh Gad were reported to be reprising their respective roles as Red and Chuck. More of the voice cast was revealed in April 2025, including Rachel Bloom and Danny McBride, who reprise their roles as Silver and Bomb, respectively. On September 18, 2025, it was announced that MrBeast, Salish Matter, Anthony Padilla, and Ian Hecox were added to the cast; Padilla and Hecox reprise their respective roles as Hal and Bubbles.

In September 2024, Josh Gad uploaded a photo of him in a recording studio—which showed a microphone and an image of Chuck on a screen—through his Instagram account, implying that voice-over for the film had begun. Psalm West was shown recording his lines with his mother, Kim Kardashian, in an episode of The Kardashians on November 6, 2025.

=== Music ===
Alongside the announcement that Paramount would distribute the film, it was reported that Heitor Pereira would return to compose the film's score.

== Marketing ==
A teaser trailer was showcased at CinemaCon 2026, before being released publicly by Paramount on June 29 of that year. Kenneth Shepard from Kotaku criticised the second trailer released in November, calling the dialogue "groanworthy" and assuming the film will be "a big collection of pop culture references".

== Release ==
The Angry Birds Movie 3 is scheduled to be released in theaters on December 23, 2026, in RealD 3D, by Paramount Pictures. It was originally set to be released on an unspecified date in 2026 before being delayed to January 29, 2027, and then moved backward to its current release date.

== See also ==
- List of films based on video games
