= Graham Nickson =

British painter (1946–2025)

Graham Nickson (30 August 1946 – 28 January 2025) was a British artist known for large-scale figurative paintings and drawings.

== Life and career ==
Nickson was born in Knowle Green, England on 30 August 1946. He studied at the Camberwell School of Art and the Royal College of Art, London.

He lived in New York City from 1976, and was the Dean of the New York Studio School from 1988 to 2024, and Dean Emeritus from 2024. He was a renowned artist and teacher developing the "Drawing Marathon," a two-week program of intensive study. Nickson worked in oils, acrylics, charcoal, and watercolor.

Nickson died in New York City on 28 January 2025, at the age of 78.

== Work and exhibitions ==
Nickson was known for his large acrylic and oil paintings of bathers on beaches and for his watercolor sunrises and sunsets. He was represented by Betty Cuningham Gallery, New York; with his most recent show having been in 2022. In 2019, he had an exhibition at the same gallery featuring frontal portraits in oil, "Eye Level".

== Awards ==
Nickson was the recipient of the Prix de Rome in 1972 and the Harkness Fellowship at Yale University in 1976. In 1989 he was awarded a Guggenheim Fellowship. He received the Howard Foundation Fellowship from Brown University in 1980 and the Ingram Merrill Fellowship in 1993.

== Collections ==
Nickson has works in the collections of the Metropolitan Museum of Art, New York, the National Gallery, Washington, DC, the Museum of Modern Art, New York, the Yale University Art Gallery, New Haven, Connecticut, and the Morgan Library and Museum, New York, among others.
