= Rosalind Bengelsdorf =

American painter

Rosalind Bengelsdorf Browne
- Bengelsdorf c. 1936
- Born: Rosalind Bengelsdorf; April 30, 1916; New York, N.Y.
- Died: February 10, 1979 (aged 62); New York, N.Y.
- Occupations: Art critic, painter, educator
- Spouse: Byron Browne (1907–1961)

Rosalind Bengelsdorf (April 30, 1916 – February 10, 1979) was an American painter, art critic and educator. She is also known as Rosalind Bengelsdorf Browne and as Rosalind Browne.

== Biography ==
Rosalind Bengelsdorf was born April 30, 1916, in New York, NY.

She studied at the Art Students League of New York as a teenager (1930–1934) with John Steuart Curry, Raphael Soyer, Anne Goldthwaite, and George Bridgman. In 1935 she joined the atelier of artist Hans Hofmann. She held a growing belief that the picture plane was a “living reality” of forms, energies, and colors. Because of this belief, Hofmann became a mentor to her for his dedication to painting as an independent object. Like Hofmann, she believed that “the shapes that compose the picture below to nothing else but the picture.” With his encouragement, she began to merge the idea that space is filled with “myriad, infinitesimal subdivisions” that changed into vibrating interplay of elements into her work. She felt that the abstract painter was observing the world and nature, tearing it apart, and putting it back together in a unique way.

In 1936, she began working as a WPA Federal Art Project muralist with Burgoyne Diller for the Central Nurses Home on Welfare Island. The mural, entitled Abstraction (now destroyed), balances simple geometric forms through position and color.

Bengelsdorf married the artist Byron Browne in 1940. The couple agreed there should be only “one painter in the family,” so Bengelsdorf stopped painting and pursued teaching and writing. She resumed painting after her husband's death in 1961.

A founding member of the American Abstract Artists, Bengelsdorf championed the cause of abstract art throughout her career. Rosalind Bengelsdorf gives an account of the founding of American Abstract Artists as a "small group of abstract artists who met at Ibram Lassaw's studio at 232 Wooster Street, New York, early in 1936. The gathering consisted roughly of Byron Browne, Gertrude and Balcomb Greene, Harry Holtzman, George McNeil, Albert Swiden, Lassaw, Burgoyne Diller, and myself. It was on this occasion we decided to form a cooperative exhibition society. Therefore this association became the first actual meeting of the American Abstract Artists, and we were, in fact, its founders."

== Collections ==
The Rosalind Bengelsdorf Browne papers and a 1968 oral history interview are located at the Archives of American Art. Her work is included in the collections of the Whitney Museum of American Art, the Metropolitan Museum of Art, New York, the National Gallery of Art, Washington, the Museum of Modern Art, New York and the Smithsonian American Art Museum.
