= Ophrah Shemesh =

Israeli-American artist

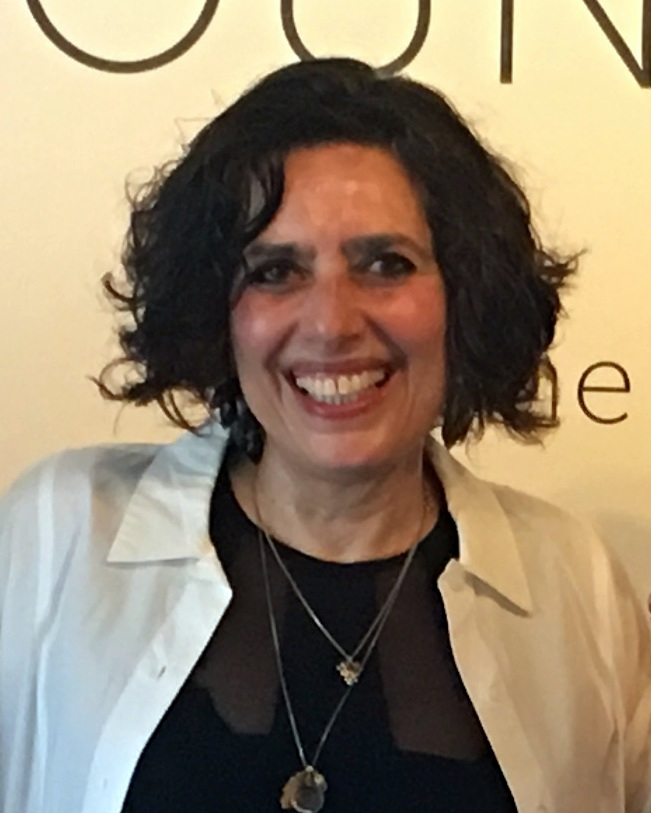
- Website: https://www.ophrahshemesh.com/

Ophrah Shemesh (December 9, 1952) is an American artist, best known for her intense, existentially themed oil and tempera paintings of women and men.

== Early life and career ==
Born in Haifa, Israel, to Albert Shemesh and Carmella-Daisy Levy. Albert was an important Lehi (Fighters for the Freedom of Israel) activist in Iraq, before the creation of the state of Israel. Shemesh studied at the Bezalel Academy of Arts and Design in Jerusalem (1972-1976).

In 1973, Israeli filmmaker and director Amos Gitai cast her in a short film, My Mother at the Seashore, and later gave her a leading role in Golem, the Spirit of Exile (1991), also starring Hanna Schygulla, Sam Fuller, and Bernardo Bertolucci.

Shemesh attended the New York Studio School of Drawing, Painting and Sculpture (NYSS) from 1979-1983. In 1986, she was one of a new group of teachers brought in by then dean, Bruce Gagnier, and has been a member of the faculty since. In 2009, she was interviewed by Stanley Crouch as part of the NYSS Evening Lecture Series, "In Conversation with Stanley Crouch". Shemesh has also taught and spoken in a variety of other programs and symposia, including the Syracuse University College of Visual and Performing Arts, Kremer Pigments, the International School of Painting, Drawing and Sculpture, the Sicily Artist in Residence Program (SARP), and the College de France.

Shemesh’s work is in the permanent collection of Collezione Maramotti and appears in Mario Diacono (2012), Archetypes and Historicity: Painting and Other Radical Forms, 1995-2007, Ophrah Shemesh: Silence of the Sirens, 2008-2011, and Max Tomasinelli (2011), Portraits of Artists.

== Solo exhibitions ==
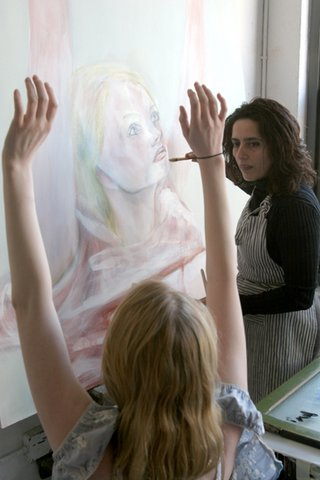
Ophrah Shemesh and model by Max Tomasinelli for Portraits of Artists, 2011

- Harms & Twombly, New York, NY, 2017
- Freight & Volume, New York, NY, 2008
- Stephen Wirtz Gallery, San Francisco, CA, 2003
- Baumgartner Gallery, New York, NY, 2002
- Guy McIntyre Gallery, New York, NY, 1997
- Mario Diacono Gallery, Boston, MA, 1995
- Galleria S.A.L.E.S., Rome, Italy, 1995
- Galleria Philippe Daverio, Milan, Italy, 1992

== Reviews ==
- Tosi, Barbara, “Tanti Retratti di Divi Non Illustri,” La Repubblica, May 24, 1995.
- Coen, Vittoria, “Ophrah Shemesh at Galleria S.A.L.E.S.,” Flash Art, 1995.
- Sherman, Mary, “Ophrah Shemesh, Mario Diacono,” ARTnews, December 1995.
- Ebony, David, “David Ebony’s Top Ten of 1997: Ophrah Shemesh at Guy McIntyre,” Artnet, December 23, 1997.
- Gagnier, Bruce Mitchel, “Ophrah Shemesh at Guy McIntyre,” Art in America, September, 1998.
- Goodman, Jonathan, “Ophrah Shemesh at Baumgartner,” Art in America, February, 2003.
- Amy, Michaël J., “Ophrah Shemesh: Freight + Volume,” Art in America, November, 2008.
- Cohen, David, “Deliciously Distressed,” New York Sun, March 13, 2008.
