= Constantin Joffé =

Russian-French-American photographer

Constantin Joffé (1910–1992) was a Russian-French-American fashion and advertising photographer who worked for the magazines Femina in the 1930s, and Vogue and Glamor in the 1940s and 1950s, during their period of widest circulation.

== Early life ==
Born in Russia, Joffé moved to France when he was young.

Before the war Joffé worked from his 'Studio 21' as a fashion photographer for French fashion magazines. As Europe became more unsettled, it has been reported that Joffé was to board the Hindenburg airship flight to the US in 1937, but luckily missed the expensive flight (equivalent to €10,000 today) that famously ended in disaster.

== Prisoner of war ==
Joffé joined the 22nd Infantry Regiment of the French Foreign Legion in 1939 at the outbreak of war and was made a corporal and put in charge of a 25mm antitank gun, but was captured in May 1940 by the Germans during the Battle of France, one of only 800 who survived, most wounded, from a regiment of 2,800 men. He was held in Stalag XVIIA Kaisersteinbruch in Germany as prisoner number 57756. He was released after twenty-one months because his shattered shoulder would not heal and prevented him from doing hard labour. His account of his time as prisoner of war was released in 1943 as We Were Free.

== In the United States ==
Joffé found his way to the United States in 1942 and became a professional photographer for Condé Nast with a feature on wartime fashions in 1944, and in 1946 received an award at the Art Directors Club exhibition for Magazine Advertising Art - Color Photography that recognised his setting, with fellow prize-winners Serge Balkin and Gjon Mili, of a "new trend"; photomontage in commercial imagery.

In the 1940s, photographers, including Irving Penn, at Vogue's studios at 480 Lexington Avenue often used them for shooting the advertising work commissioned by outside clients. The practice was at first tolerated but by 1950 it was banned on the grounds that it "has interfered with our own interests and has been a severe handicap to our editorial operations." In response Joffé and three other Condé Nast photographers Serge Balkin, Herbert Matter and Geoffrey Baker left to establish Studio Enterprises Inc. in the former House & Garden studio on 37th Street (Penn stayed on but also left in 1952).

Joffé in 1948 traveled for Vogue to India via Europe where he did a story with six pages of photographs on the Dutch rebuilding after the war before photographing Mahatma Gandhi who spent his last months before his assassination living with his family at the residence of the industrialist G. D. Birla, one of Gandhi's benefactors, in New Delhi. Vogue financed his six months in India and published several articles illustrated by him in a realist, casual style on the fashion worn by maharajas and maharanis and sights of the country, including one with the pages of colour For the latter Indian essay The Art Directors Club, at its twenty-eighth exhibition of advertising and editorial art in the Museum of Modern Art, bestowed an Art Directors Club Medal on Vogue's Art Directors, Alexander Liberman and Priscilla Peck, for "the best editorial design of a complete unit in a periodical," for their use of Constantin Joffé's "superb colour pictures of India," and a photograph he made at this time of a sick or starving man dying in an Indian city street was included by Edward Steichen in the world-touring Museum of Modern Art exhibition The Family of Man, seen by 9 million visitors.

== Portraiture ==
Amongst Joffé's portrait subjects for Condé Nast publications Vogue, Glamour and House and Garden, in which he shows himself equally adept in the studio with artificial lighting, and on location with available light, were Adele Astaire, Truman Capote, Paul and Jane Bowles, Claude Rains, Muriel King, Man Singh II, Dorothy Bellanca, Robert W. White, Cedric Hardwicke, Lilli Palmer, Sally Kirkland, Winifred Stanley, Said Pasha, I. Rice Pereira, Frank Sinatra, Thomas Phipps, Frank Fay, Josephine Hull, Dutch Harrison, Mary Sinclair, Dooley Wilson, Lewis W. Douglas, Charles Munch, Georges Laurent, Richard Burgin, Hafez Afifi Pasha, Florence Desmond, Joan McCracken, Mary Howard, Zino Francescatti, June Vincent, Thomas Phipps, Celeste Holm, John R. McLean, Meg Mundy, Wright S. Ludington, John A. Lessard, C. Z. Guest, Ronald Colman, Benita Hume, Sharman Douglas, Harris Wofford, Sam Snead, Freda Kirchwey, Peter C. Goldmark, Thelma Irene Chrysler, Clare Boothe Luce, Richard Todd, F. O. Matthiessen, Frank Lloyd Wright, Valerie Bettis, Heitor Villa-Lobos, Basil Rathbone, Beatrice Straight, I. I. Rabi, Colin McPhee, Edgard Varèse, Mahatma Gandhi, Margaret Halsey, F. S. C. Northrop, Dorothea Tanning, Charles Boyer, Konstantin Simonov, Alan Hovhaness, Arnold J. Toynbee, Eveline M. Burns, Uta Hagen, Preston Burch, Vladimir Nabokov, Jane M. Bolin, and Anna Maria Alberghetti.

== Colour ==
Joffé was advanced in his use of colour at a time when it was still technically and aesthetically challenging. In his photo book The Art and Technique of Color Photography from 1951, Liberman identifies the then best color photographers in the US, giving primacy to primarily fashion-oriented photographers and classing Joffé as in the class of Serge Balkin, Cecil Beaton, Erwin Blumenfeld, Haanel Cassidy, Clifford Coffin, Anthony Denney, William Grigsby, Horst P. Horst, André Kertész, Herbert Matter, Frances McLaughlin, Gjon Mili, Norman Parkinson, Irving Penn, John Rawlings and Richard Rutledge.

== Advertising ==
Joffé's advertising work, undertaken as director of Studio Enterprises Inc., later named Studio Associates International, included the "Marlboro Man" cigarette series over the 1960s (the world's longest-running advertising campaign to date) for agency Leo Burnett which changed the target gender of the filtered cigarette from women to men, Hertz cars, and the first Joy dish-washing detergent commercial.

== Film ==
From the late 60s Joffé divided his career between commercial and fashion photography and motion pictures. In 1967, in Nigeria shooting an NBC-TV spot on cola nuts for Royal Crown Cola's Nancy Sinatra special, his production team comprising himself, Barry Lissee, producer for the D'Arcy ad agency, and a pick-up cameraman, were jailed briefly by special security police on suspicion of being white mercenaries employed by Portugal.

He moved to Florida in his old age and died in 1992.

== Exhibitions ==
From 2013 to 2017 Coming into Fashion: A Century of Photography at Condé Nast (titled for French audiences Papier glacé, un siècle de photographie de mode chez Condé Nast) organised by the Foundation for the Exhibition of Photography, Minneapolis, in partnership with Vogue Paris, Metro News, Paris Première featuring Joffé's work, toured galleries in Berlin, Milan, Edinburgh, Zurich, Moscow, West Palm Beach, Fort Worth, Tokyo, the Gold Coast, and Beijing.

Constantin Joffé was represented in four Museum of Modern Art exhibitions during his lifetime:

- The Family of Man January 24 – May 8, 1955
- Color Photography, May 9–July 4, 1950
- Modern Art in Your Life, October 5–December 4, 1949
- The 28th Annual Exhibition of Advertising and Editorial Art of the New York Art Directors Club, March 15 – April 17, 1949

== Collections ==
- Family of Man Museum, Clervaux Castle, Luxembourg
- The Center for Creative Photography holds 3 prints of images made by Joffé for Vogue.
