= Arthur Beecher Carles =

American painter (1882–1952)

Arthur B. Carles
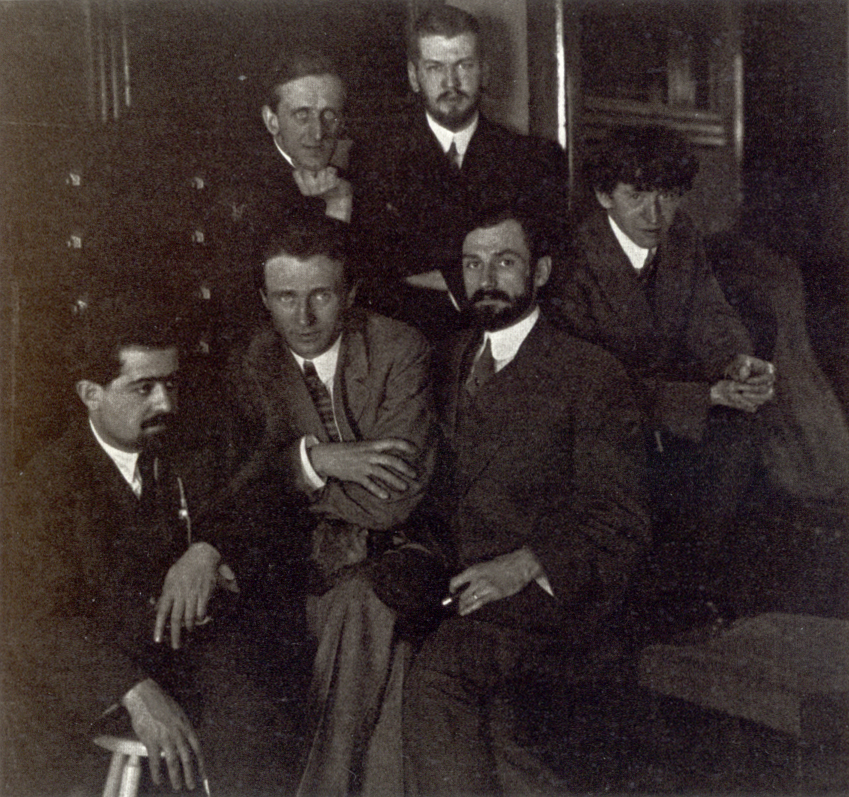
- Young American Artists of the Modern School, L. to R. Jo Davidson, Edward Steichen, Arthur B. Carles, John Marin; back: Marsden Hartley, Laurence Fellows, c. 1911, Bates College Museum of Art
- Born: Arthur Beecher Carles; March 9, 1882; Philadelphia, Pennsylvania, U.S.
- Died: June 8, 1952 (aged 70); Chestnut Hill, Pennsylvania, U.S.
- Style: Impressionist, expressionist art
- Movement: American Modernism
- Relatives: Sara Carles Johns (sister); Mercedes Matter (daughter); Herbert Matter (son-in-law); Jordan Matter (great-grandson)

Arthur Beecher Carles (March 9, 1882 – June 18, 1952) was an American modernist painter. He studied at the Pennsylvania Academy of the Fine Arts and won the Cresson Traveling Scholarship in 1905 and 1906. He traveled to France and was influenced by Impressionism through the social network of Gertrude Stein and Leo Stein. He taught at the Pennsylvania Academy of the Fine Arts from 1917 to 1925. He had several one-man art exhibits including at 291, the Art Institute of Chicago and the Pennsylvania Museum of Art. After his death, his art was exhibited at multiple museums.

== Early life and education ==
Carles was born in Pennsylvania in 1882 and was raised in Philadelphia. He studied at the Pennsylvania Academy of the Fine Arts between 1900 and 1907. He studied with Hugh Breckenridge, Henry McCarter, Cecilia Beaux, and William Merritt Chase. He was an admirer of Édouard Manet and James McNeill Whistler. He won the Henry P. Thouron prize in 1903 for his painting and the Cresson Traveling Scholarship in 1905 and 1906 which allowed him to travel to France and remain there until 1909. In France, Alfred Henry Maurer introduced him to art collectors Gertrude and Leo Stein and he became interested in Impressionism. He became close friends with Eduard Steichen and was greatly influenced by the work of Henri Matisse. He accepted a commission from St. Paul's Episcopal Church in Philadelphia to create a copy of Raphael's Transfiguration.

== Career ==
He returned to Philadelphia in 1910. In March 1910 his work was included in the “Younger American Painters” show held at Alfred Stieglitz’s New York City gallery, 291. Stieglitz gave Carles his first one-man show at 291 in January 1912. He also had one-man shows at the Art Institute of Chicago, the Cosmopolitan Club of Philadelphia, and the Philadelphia Museum of Art.

He returned to France from June to October 1912 and exhibited at the 1912 Salon d'Automne. After his return to America he exhibited at the Armory Show of 1913. During World War I, he directed the camouflage painting of Navy ships at the Philadelphia Navy Yard.

Art historian Barbara Ann Boese Wolanin describes Carles as a link between Philadelphia and Paris, and as "one of the most brilliant colorists in the history of American art." She says of him: "His paintings range in style from tonalism and Impressionism to prophecies of Abstract expressionism. His approach was intuitive. An expressionist by nature, he was guided by feeling, believing that accuracy is an intellectual quality while art is an affair of the emotions'".

He taught at PAFA from 1917 to 1925 and was a proponent of modernism. He was fired from the Pennsylvania Academy of the Fine Arts in 1925 after several warnings about missing classes. In the 1930s, he taught students privately including Jane Piper and Morris Blackburn.

He suffered from depression after the death of his mother in 1927 and was hospitalized multiple times for alcoholism. In December 1941, he was partially paralyzed from a stroke. He could no longer paint and used a wheelchair until his death in 1952 in Chestnut Hill, Pennsylvania.

== Legacy ==
After his death, his art has been exhibited at the Corcoran Gallery of Art, the Hirshhorn Museum and Sculpture Garden, the Musée d'Art Moderne de Paris, the Museum of Fine Arts, Houston, the Parrish Art Museum, the Pennsylvania Academy of the Fine Arts in 1983, the Rhode Island School of Design, the Royal Scottish Academy, the Whitney Museum of American Art, and the Woodmere Art Museum in 2001.

In 2004, Carles was the subject of the documentary film Arthur B. Carles: Philadelphia Artist, directed by Margaret Chew Barringer and sponsored by Harold FitzGerald "Gerry" Lenfest. Premiering at the Pennsylvania Academy of the Fine Arts, the film highlights Carles's influence on early 20th-century American modernism through archival photographs, readings from his personal letters, and commentary from Philadelphia art scholars and museum leaders.

== Personal life ==
He married Mercedes de Cordoba in 1909 and they were divorced in 1926. Their daughter, Mercedes Matter was a painter and writer. Carles re-married Caroline Robinson in 1927 and they had a daughter also named Caroline. His sister, Sara Carles Johns, was an artist and fashion illustrator.

== Gallery ==
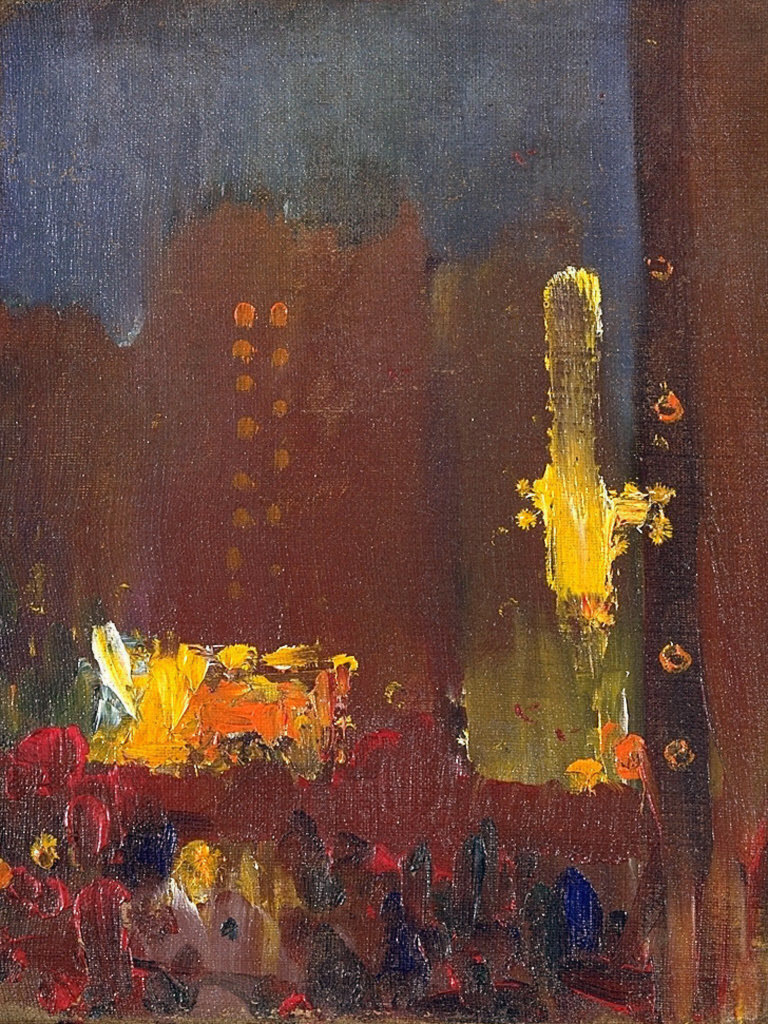
City at Night (1905)

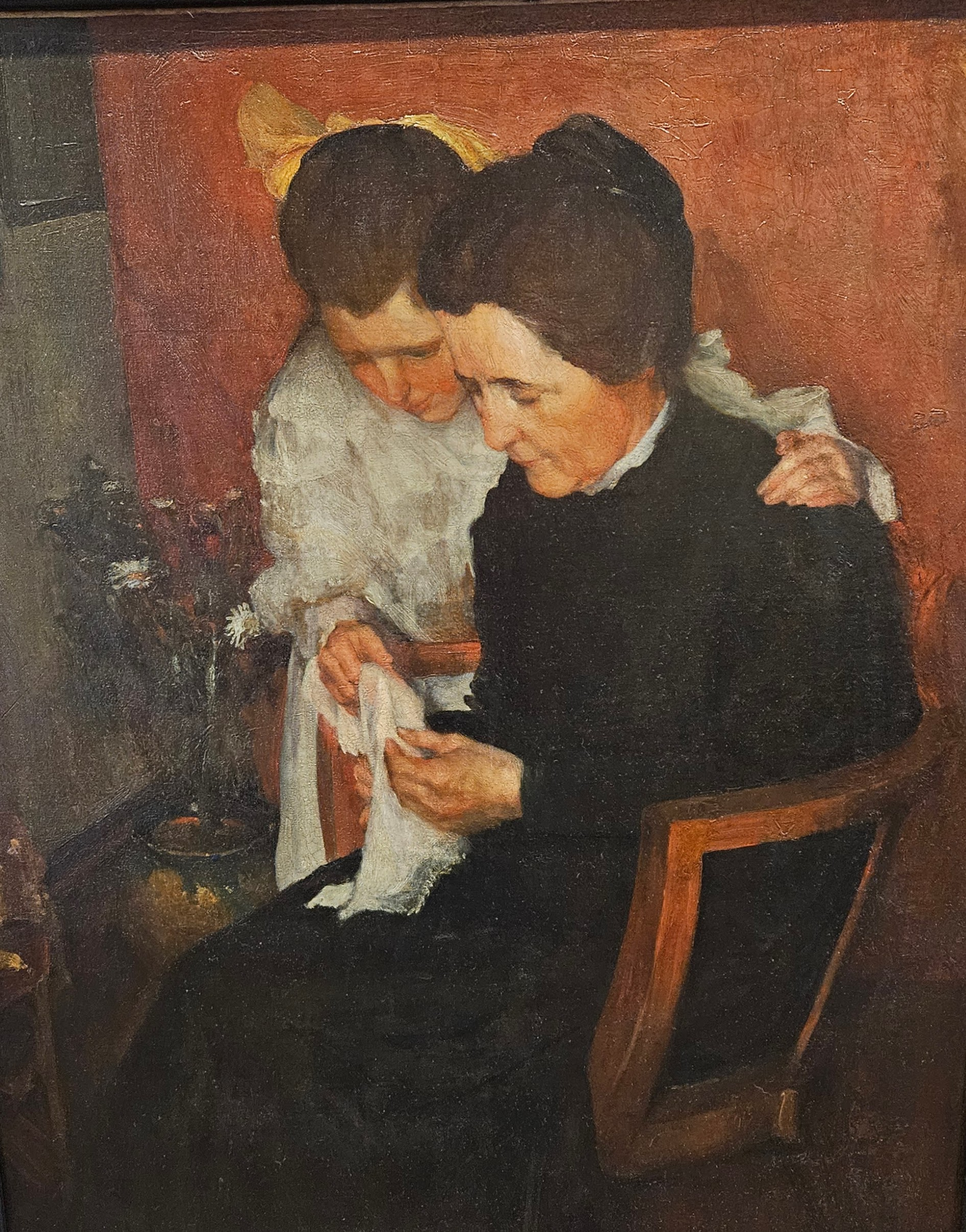
Portrait of Mrs Carles and Sara (1907)

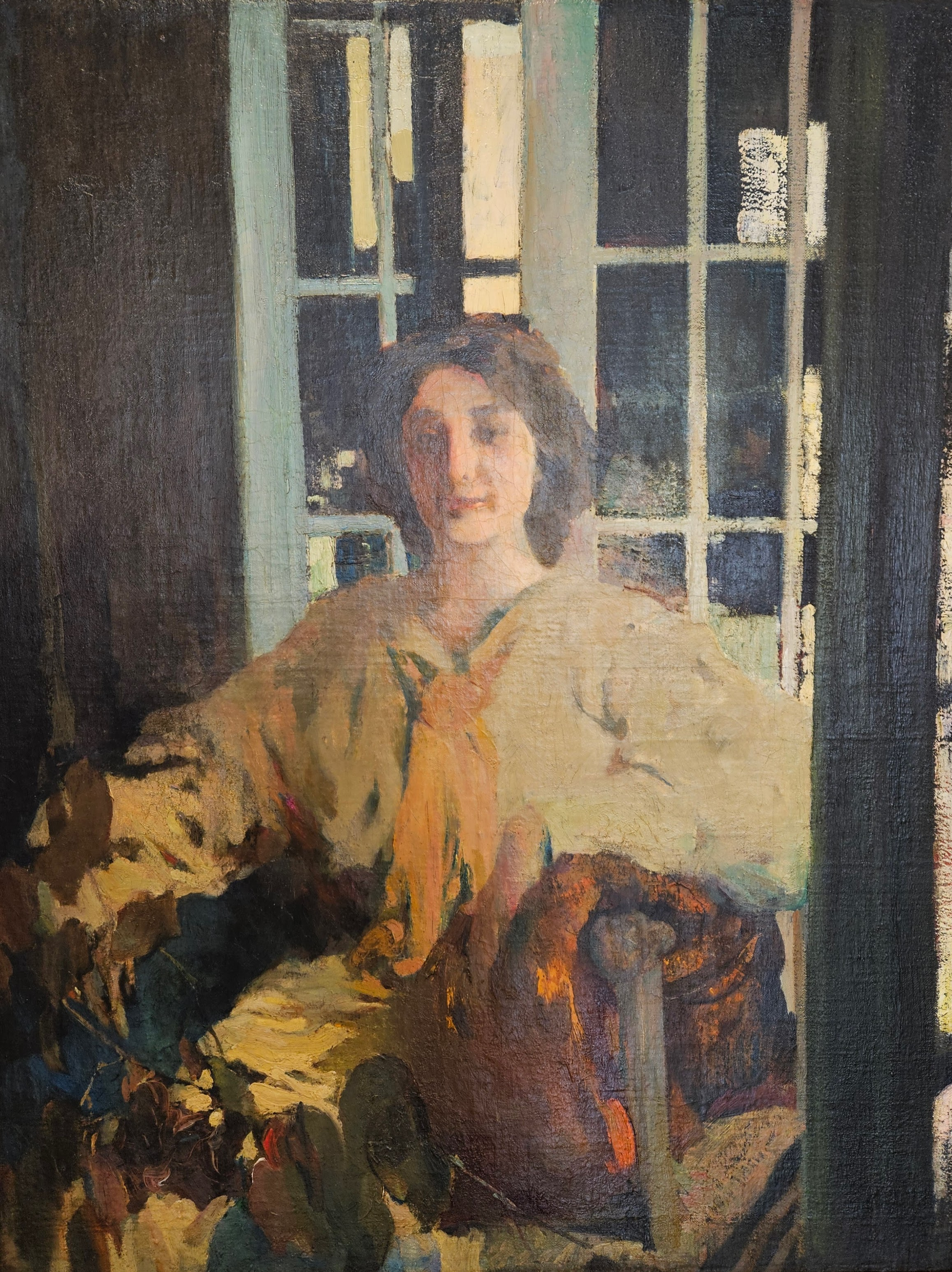
Mercedes de Cordoba (1908)

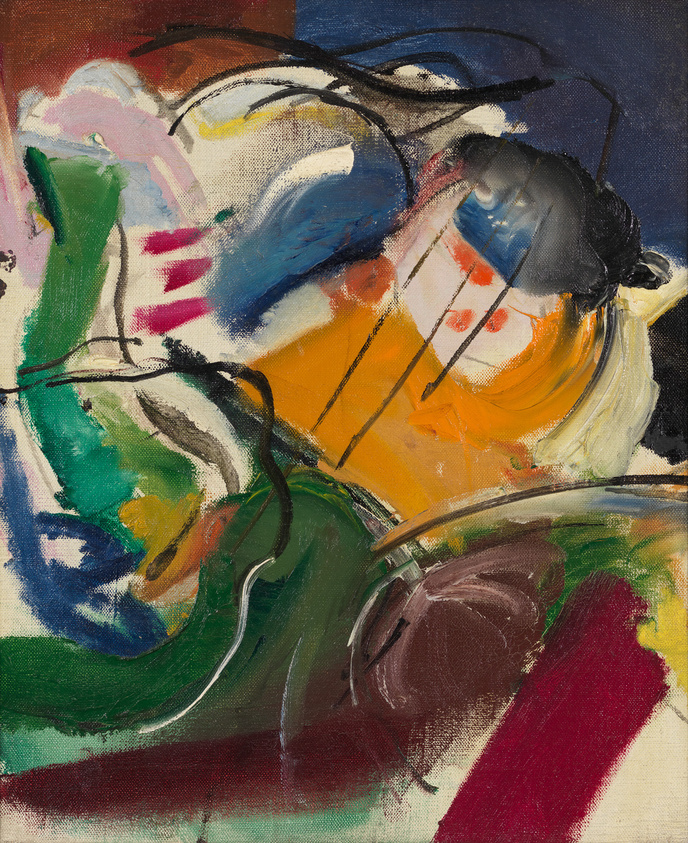
Abstraction (1908-1912)

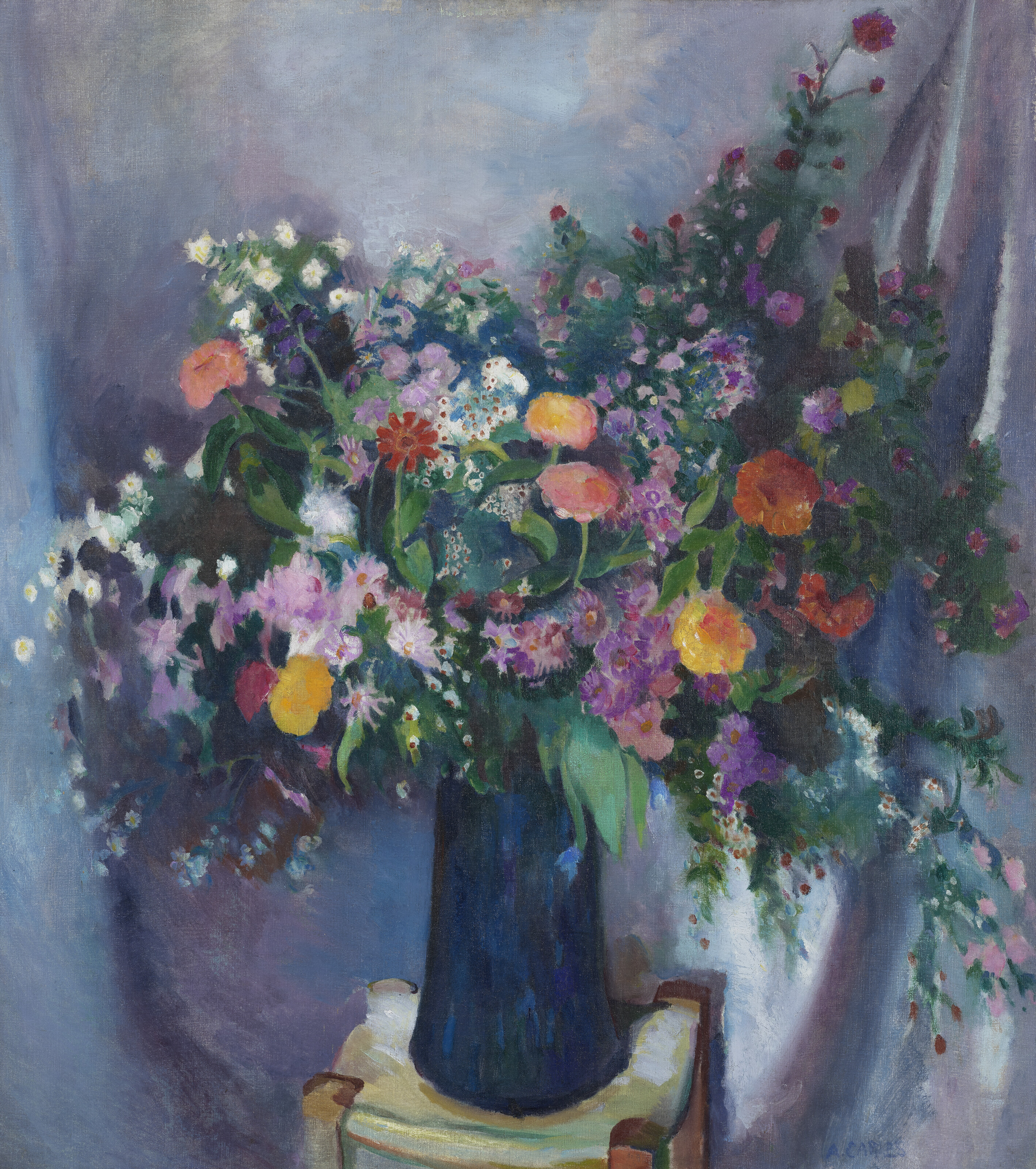
Zinnias and Asters (1915)

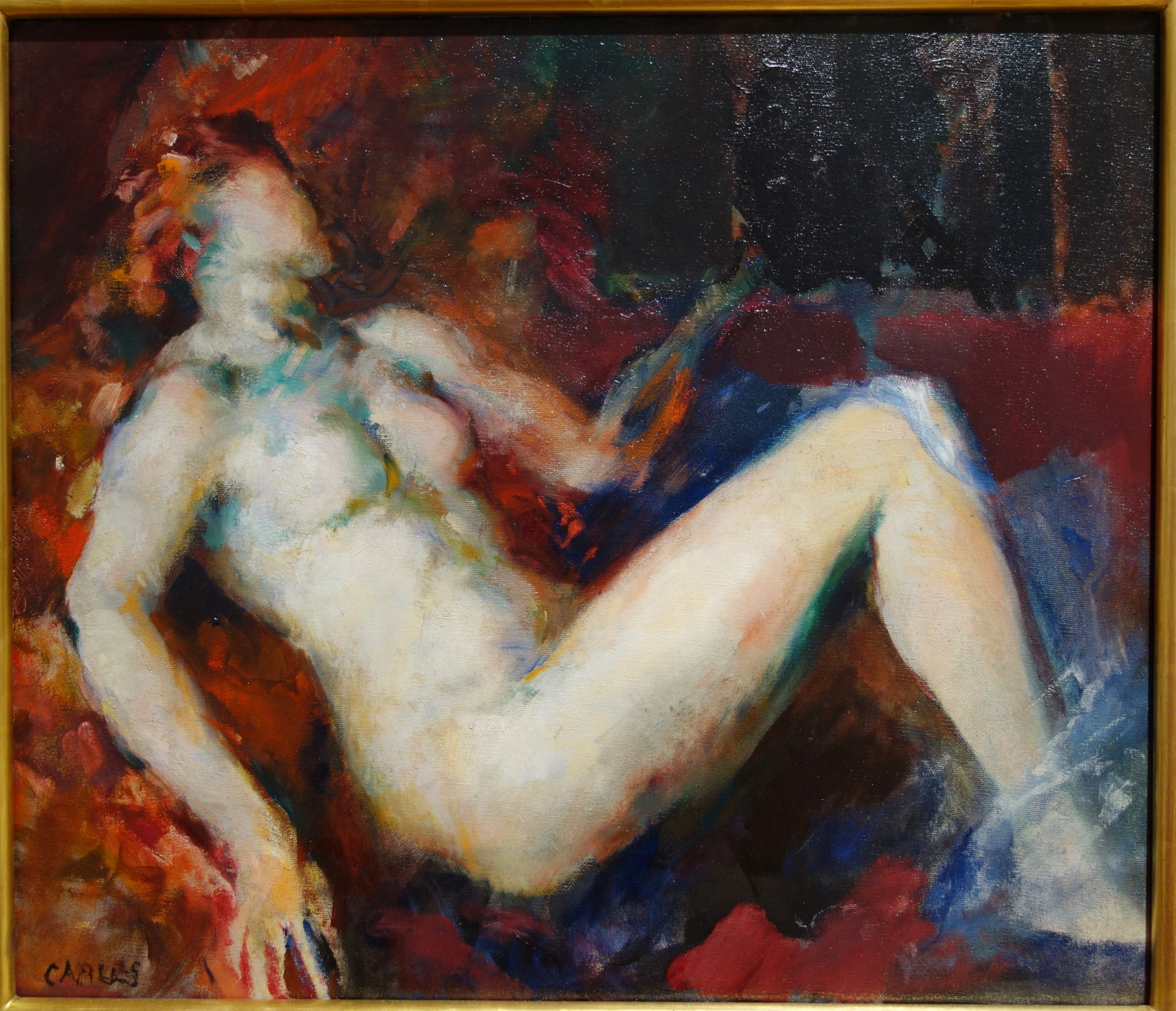
Reclining Nude (1915-1921)

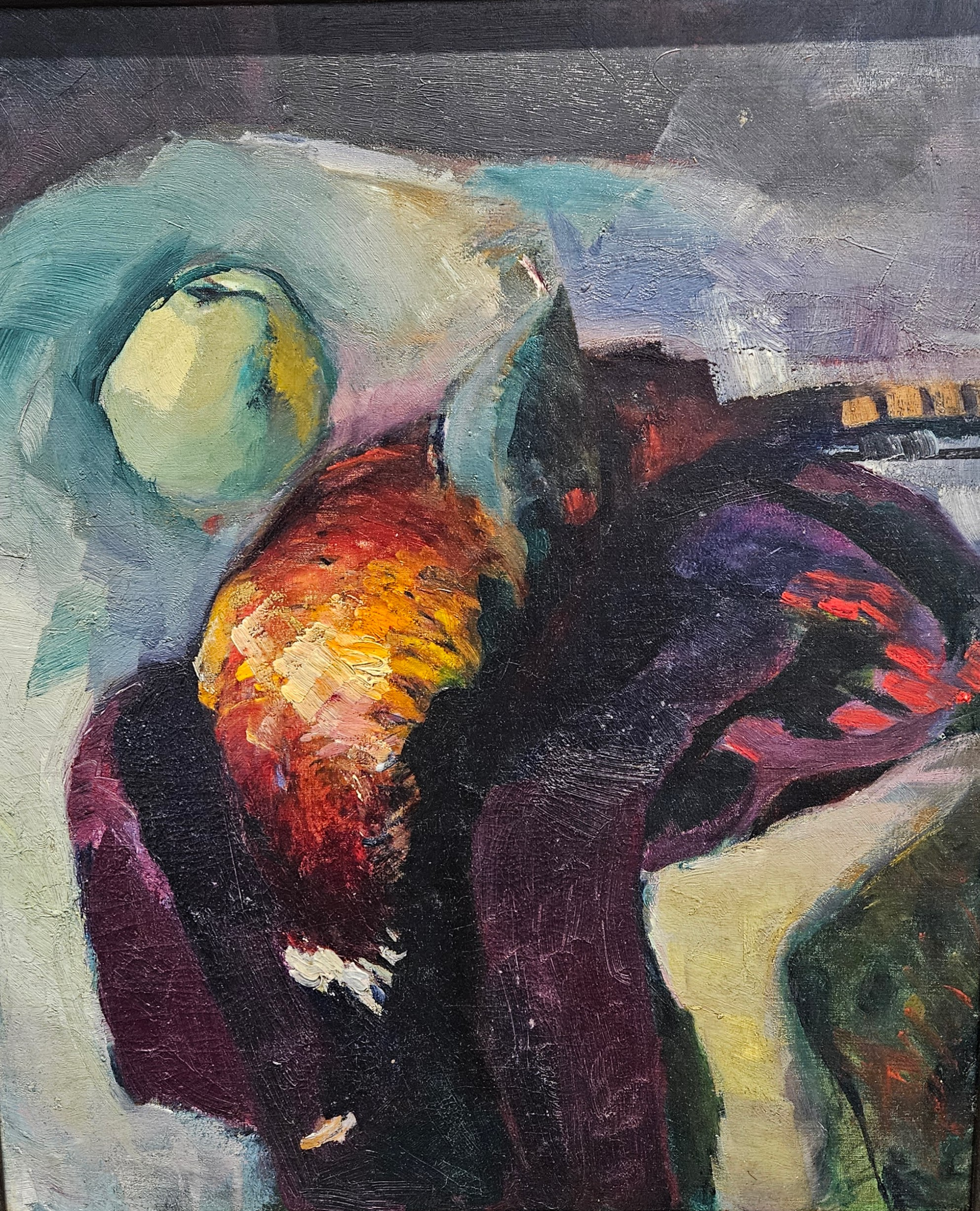
Pheasant with Green Apple (1924)

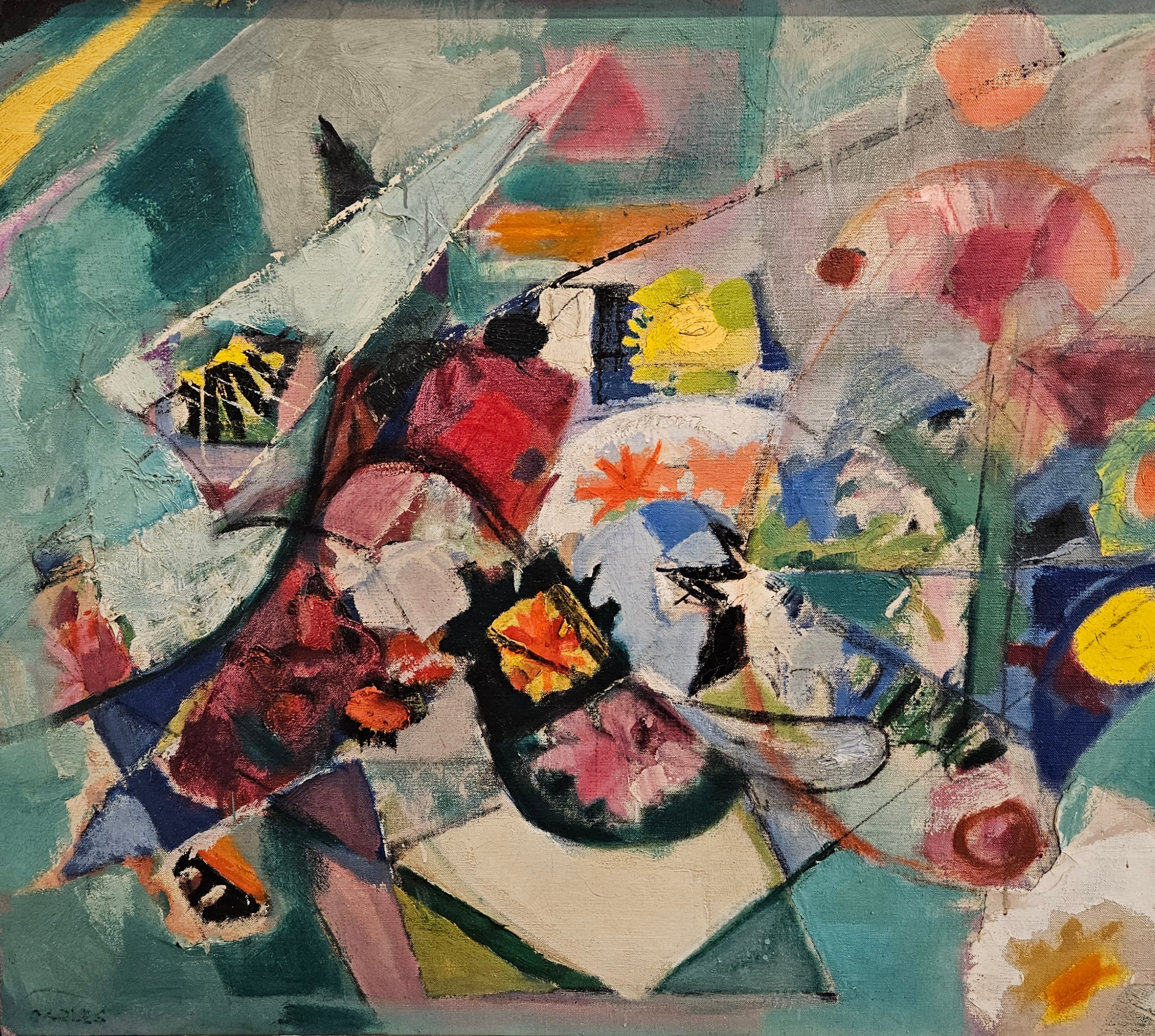
Abstract Bouquet (1939)
