= Salish Matter =

American content creator (born 2009)

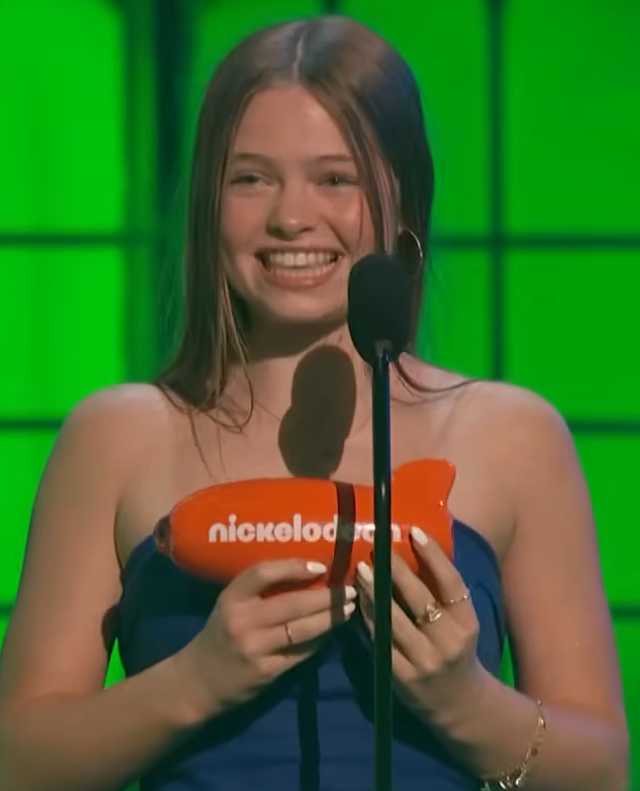
- Matter in 2025
- Born: November 29, 2009 (age 16)
- Occupations: Social media personality; entrepreneur; actress
- Years active: 2020–present
- Parents: Jordan Matter (father); Lauren Matter (mother)
- Relatives: Hudson Matter (brother)

Instagram information
- Page: Salish Matter
- Years active: 2020–present
- Followers: 5 million

TikTok information
- Page: Salish
- Followers: 9.1 million

YouTube information
- Channel: Salish
- Years active: 2023–present
- Subscribers: 4.5 million
- Views: 177 million

Salish Matter (born November 29, 2009) is an American social media personality, entrepreneur, content creator and actress. She is the daughter of photographer Jordan Matter and his wife Lauren Matter, and has an older brother, Hudson Matter. She gained recognition through appearances on her father's YouTube channel before developing her own online following. In 2025, she was announced as a voice actor in The Angry Birds Movie 3 and launched the skincare brand Sincerely Yours in collaboration with Sephora.

== Career ==
Matter began appearing in her father's YouTube videos in 2018, participating in lifestyle and challenge-based content. She later created her own social media accounts, posting content focused on gymnastics, dance, and family collaborations.

In 2023, Matter provided a minor voice role in Ruby Gillman, Teenage Kraken. In 2025, she was announced as part of the voice cast of The Angry Birds Movie 3, alongside Jimmy Donaldson, Jason Sudeikis, and Josh Gad.

In June 2025, Matter won the Kids' Choice Award for Favorite Female Creator, which she won again in November 2026. In September 2025, Matter launched Sincerely Yours, a skincare brand distributed by Sephora. The brand launch event at the American Dream Mall in New Jersey drew significant public attention, resulting in an early closure due to large crowds. In 2026, the show Salish & Jordan Matter starring her and her father was released on Netflix.

== Filmography ==
Key
†	Denotes films that have not yet been released

Year	Title	Role	Notes
2023	Ruby Gillman, Teenage Kraken	Kraken Kid	Film; Voice role
2026-present	Salish & Jordan Matter	Herself	Streaming series
2026	Salish's 12 Games of Christmas	Herself	Streaming series
2026	The Angry Birds Movie 3 †	TBA	Film; Voice role

== Awards ==
Year	Award	Category	Nominee(s)	Result	Ref.
2024	Kids' Choice Awards	Favorite Creator Family	Jordan Matter/Salish Matter	Won	
2025	Kids' Choice Awards	Favorite Female Creator	Salish Matter	Won	
2026	Kids' Choice Awards	Favorite Female Creator	Salish Matter	Won	
2026	Kids' Choice Awards	Favorite Creator Family	Jordan and Salish Matter	Won	
