= Cosmopolitan Club of Philadelphia =

Private social club in Pennsylvania, US

Coordinates: 39.9481°N 75.1681°W

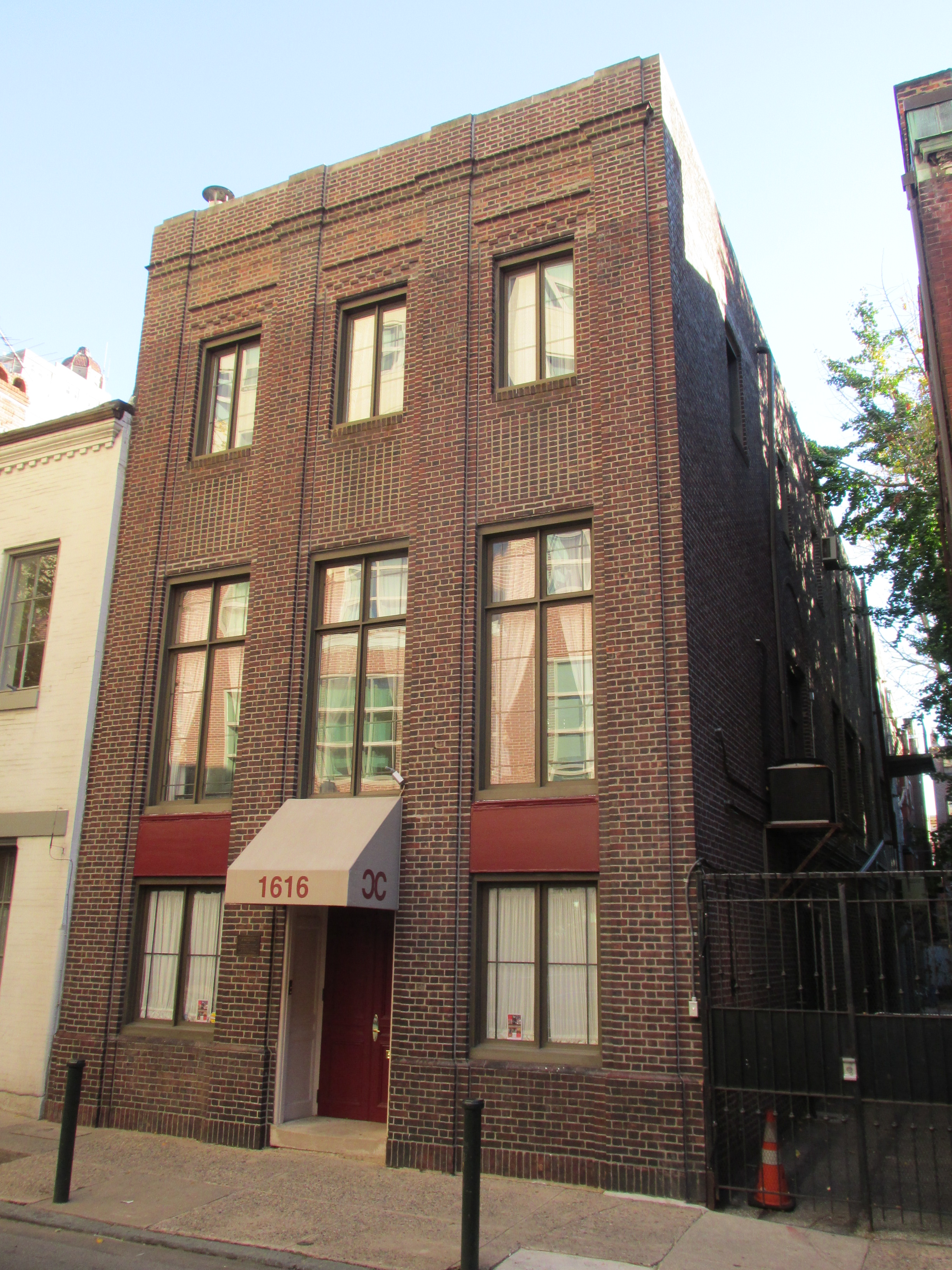
- The Cosmopolitan Club of Philadelphia
- Type: Private members' club
- Tax ID no.: 23-0495600
- Headquarters: 1616 Latimer St.
- Location: Philadelphia, Pennsylvania, U.S.
- Website: www.cosclub.org

The Cosmopolitan Club of Philadelphia is a private members' club in Philadelphia. It was founded in June 1928 by a group of women from Philadelphia and its surroundings. In January 1930, the members had purchased the lot at 1616 Latimer Street, and oversaw the construction of an Art Deco building.

It operates under law for 501(c)(7) Social and Recreation Clubs. In 2025, it claimed $789,933 in total revenue and $1,620,271 in total assets.

The members of the Cosmopolitan Club of Philadelphia are all women, and they represent a wide array of ages, races, cultures, interests, skills, professions and affiliations. They work and volunteer in the community. Thirty-eight of the club's past and present members have been named Distinguished Daughters of Pennsylvania.

== See also ==
- National Society of the Colonial Dames of America in Philadelphia
