= Artists Union =

American union of artists

- Harry Gottlieb's membership card, in the Archives of American Art of the Smithsonian Institution
- Merged into: Artists League of America
- Formation: 1933–34
- Dissolved: May 1942
- Type: union
- Purpose: employment for artists
- Headquarters: 60 West Fifteenth Street
- Location: New York City, United States
- First president: Byron Browne
- First secretary: Bernarda Bryson
- Formerly called: Emergency Work Bureau Artists Group; Unemployed Artists Group

The Artists Union or Artists' Union was a short-lived union of artists in New York in the years of the Great Depression. It was influential in the establishment of both the Public Works of Art Project in December 1933 and the Federal Art Project of the Works Progress Administration in August 1935. It functioned as the principal meeting-place for artists in the city in the 1930s, and thus had far-ranging effects on the social history of the arts in America.

== History ==
The Artists Union started in September 1933 as a group of about twenty-five artists who worked for the Emergency Work Bureau, which was soon to be shut down. The group met informally at the John Reed Club and was at first called the Emergency Work Bureau Artists Group, though this was soon changed to become the Unemployed Artists Group. The secretary of the new group was Bernarda Bryson, who had been involved with the Unemployed Councils of the American Communist Party. Byron Browne was the first president. A number of members of the union were also Communist Party members, among them Phil Bard, Boris Gorelick and Max Spivak, founding members of the group. Other artists who later joined the union included Balcomb Greene and his wife Gertrude, Ibram Lassaw, Michael Loew and Mark Rothko.

On 27 October 1933 members of the group were among the leaders of some three hundred artists who attended a symposium on unemployment at the College Art Association, where they demanded state-funded relief work for artists. In December 1933 the group petitioned Harry L. Hopkins, the administrator of the Civil Works Administration, to provide work in various artistic fields to all unemployed artists. The Public Works of Art Project was established later in the same month.

The administrator of the Public Works of Art Project for New York was Juliana Force, who was director of the Whitney Museum of American Art. She asked major artists' associations to provide lists of their unemployed, but did not contact the Unemployed Artists Group. On 9 January 1934 the group picketed the Whitney with placards targeting the director, the first of a series of protests. The administration responded with offers of jobs, and it became accepted that artists should be included in the government work-relief plan.

The group no longer consisted only of unemployed artists, and changed its name to the Artists Union. A second-floor loft was found at 60 West Fifteenth Street, and meetings were held there on Wednesday nights. Attendance was usually two or three hundred people, but could be much higher. The Union had become the principal social and cultural meeting-place for artists in New York. A magazine, Art Front, was published from November 1934, initially in collaboration with the Artists Committee of Action, which had formed to protest the destruction by Nelson Rockefeller of Diego Rivera's mural Man at the Crossroads earlier that year. Members of the Union were often ready to participate in protests and demonstrations of other worker's unions or of politically left-wing organizations, and came to be known as the "fire brigade".

The Union – together with the Artists' Committee of Action, the International Labor Defense, the John Reed Club, the League of Struggle for Negro Rights and the Vanguard group of Louise Thompson and Augusta Savage – organized the second of the two 1935 New York anti-lynching exhibitions. It opened on 2 March 1935 at the ACA Gallery on West 8th Street, with the title "The Struggle for Negro Rights".

When the Federal Art Project of the Works Progress Administration was set up in August 1935, the good conditions offered to artists, including the relatively high pay rate, were largely a consequence of pressure by the Union. The administration was conceived as a temporary response to an emergency, but the Artists Union strongly opposed any attempt to reduce its scope. Throughout 1936 various protests and sit-ins were held, culminating on 1 December 1936 in the occupation of the art project offices in New York City in protest at proposed employment cuts; the police were called and arrested 219 artists, the largest-ever arrest in the city at that time. At another sit-in in June 1937, more than 600 artists and others took hostage officials of the arts projects, and a delegation went to Washington, DC. These and other tactics delayed but did not prevent the progressive reduction of the Federal Art Project, and the influence of the Union began to decline. It attempted to negotiate affiliation with the American Federation of Labor, but without success. In January 1938 it changed its name to the United American Artists and became Local 60 of the Congress of Industrial Organizations, which had recently formed. It left that congress in May 1942 and merged with the American Artists' Congress, thus creating the Artists League of America.
