= Max Spivak =

American painter (1906–1981)

Max Spivak (1906 in Bregnun, Poland - 1981 in New York City) was an American visual artist known primarily as a ceramic muralist.

Initially Spivak pursued a career as an accountant, then he travelled to Paris where he met the painter Arshile Gorky who was a big influence on him.

Spivak was among the many artists who created murals for the Federal Art Project of the Works Progress Administration (WPA) during the American Great Depression. During this time, one of his assistants was the future abstract expressionist icon Lee Krasner.

Spivak is especially noted for his mosaic mural in the vestibule entryway of 111 West 40th street in midtown Manhattan (today re-addressed as 5 Bryant Park), a work which through abstract forms pays tribute to some of the tools of the garment industry which once flourished in the location's Lower Manhattan district.

Spivak's work was included in two exhibitions at the Museum of Modern Art (MoMA), New Horizons in American Art in 1935 and Painting and Sculpture in Architecture in 1949.
