= Esteban Vicente =

Spanish-American painter

- Red Field, 1972, oil on canvas, 56 1/8 x 68 1/8 inches, Museo de Arte Contemporáneo Esteban Vicente
- Born: Esteban Vicente Pérez; January 20, 1903; Turégano, Spain
- Died: January 10, 2001 (aged 97); Bridgehampton, New York, United States
- Education: Royal Academy of Fine Arts of San Fernando, Madrid
- Known for: Painting, Sculpture, Printmaking, Drawing, Collage
- Movement: Abstract expressionism

Esteban Vicente Pérez (January 20, 1903 – January 10, 2001) was a Spanish American painter born in Turégano, Spain. He was one of the first generation of New York School abstract expressionists. He identified as an antifascist.

== Early life ==
Esteban Vicente was born in Turégano, Spain on January 20, 1903. His mother, Sofia Pérez y Álvarez came from an Asturian family and was born in Valladolid. His father, Toribio Vicente Ruiz, came from a military family near Salamanca and was an army officer. Esteban Vicente had two sisters and three brothers. He was the third child and second son. Vicente's father resigned his commission and moved his family to the capital, Madrid, where he worked as a buildings administrator for the Banco de España so that the children could be educated at good Jesuit schools. Vicente was taken to the Museo del Prado by his father, an art enthusiast, almost every Sunday from the time he was four years old and began to draw when he was sixteen. He was expected to follow family tradition and join the army. After three months in military school he decided to become an artist.

== Training ==
Vicente enrolled at the Real Academia de Bellas Artes in Madrid in 1921 intending to study sculpture. He completed his training in 1924. Commenting on his experience at the Academy he said "It doesn't give you any ideas about anything. It gives you tools, and teaches you about materials. Academic training is safe. It prepares you to be against."

== Career ==
He had his first one-man exhibition in Madrid in 1928, after which he left for Paris and did not return to Spain until 1930. In 1935 he married Estelle Charney, an American whom he had met in Paris. After the outbreak of the Spanish Civil War in 1936 Vicente, supporting the Loyalist forces, painted camouflage in the mountains outside Madrid for a few months. Later that year he and his wife moved to New York City. The (Loyalist) Spanish Ambassador to the U.S. set him up as a Vice Consul in Philadelphia, a position which supported his family for three years. Vicente had ample time to continue with his art and had his first one-man show in New York at the Kleeman Gallery in 1937. After the fall of the Spanish Republic in 1939 he returned to New York City. During World War II he supported himself with portrait commissions and by teaching Spanish. A 1945 exhibition in Puerto Rico led in 1946 to a position at the University of Puerto Rico teaching painting. After his return to New York in 1947 he established relationships with most of the members of the nascent New York School, participating in their seminal exhibitions at the Kootz Gallery in 1950, in the 9th Street Art Exhibition in 1951 and in exhibitions at the Sidney Janis Gallery, and Charles Egan Gallery. Subsequently he was represented by the Leo Castelli, André Emmerich, and Berry-Hill Galleries in New York City. He was a founding member of the New York Studio School, where he taught for 36 years. Although he never exhibited in Spain during the rule of Francisco Franco, in 1998 the Spanish government opened the Esteban Vicente Museum of Contemporary Art in Segovia.

Vicente maintained a house and studio in Bridgehampton, New York from 1964. His marriage to Estelle Charney ended in divorce in 1943. Their daughter Mercedes, died at aged six. A second marriage, to author Maria Teresa Babin, also ended in divorce. Vicente died in Bridgehampton on January 10, 2001. He was survived by his third wife, Harriet Peters, whom he married in 1961.

He has been honored as a renowned artist and child advocate by a New York City Bronx School Public School 170, a Kindergarten to Second Grade school has been named the Esteban Vicente school. A family member has incorporated Art programs into the schools. Students' talents emerge as they are exposed to the culture. At PS 170 students learn about Esteban Vicente and his style, color and design. Examples of his work adorn the walls of the school.

Vicente has a museum devoted to him in Segovia, Spain, the Museo de Arte Contemporáneo Esteban Vicente, and a street named after him in Turégano.

From 15 October 2003 - 8 February 2004, the Museo de Arte Abstracto Español, Cuenca exhibited Esteban Vicente. Collages. The exhibit displayed "a selection of 27 collages made by the artist between 1950 and 1994." From 23 February - 22 May 2004, the Museu Fundación Juan March Palma exhibited Esteban Vicente. Gesture and Colour. The exhibit presented a variety of works from his career from the 1950s to 1990s.

In March 2011 the Grey Art Gallery at New York University exhibited Concrete Improvisations: Collages and Sculpture by Esteban Vicente. In addition to 60 paper collages, the exhibit included 20 of Vicente's small-scale assemblages called divertimentos (toys), composed from pieces of found wood and covered with white plaster, with others composed of plastic and wood with architectonic elements.
