= Mercedes Matter =

American painter, draughtswoman, and writer

- Born: Mercedes Carles; 1913; New York City, U.S.
- Died: December 4, 2001 (aged 87–88); Long Island, New York, U.S.
- Education: Arthur B. Carles (father), Bennett College, Maurice Sterne, Alexander Archipenko, Hans Hofmann
- Known for: Painting, Drawing, Educator
- Movement: Abstract Expressionism
- Spouse: Herbert Matter (m. 1939; died in 1984)

Mercedes Matter (née Carles; 1913 – December 4, 2001) was an American painter, draughtswoman, and writer. She was a founding member of the American Abstract Artists, and the Founder and Dean Emeritus of the New York Studio School.

== Biography ==
Matter's father was the American modernist painter Arthur Beecher Carles. Her mother, Mercedes de Cordoba, was a model for Edward Steichen. Matter grew up in Philadelphia, New York City, and Europe.

She first painted under her father's supervision at age 6 and would later recall being given a paintbox to use while working alongside him in the French countryside. After her parents divorced in 1926, Matter spent her remaining school years at various private schools in Europe and America. At the age of 12, she returned to Europe and lived in Italy for over 2 years. She would later recount that her time in Italy—including Venice, Assisi, Rome, and Florence—was formative and her primary education in art history. Subsequent studies included at Bennett College in Millbrook, NY with sculptor Lu Duble, and in New York City with Maurice Sterne, Alexander Archipenko and Hans Hofmann.

In the late 1930s, Matter was an original member of the American Abstract Artists. She also worked for the Works Progress Administration. She worked with Fernand Léger, who would become a close friend, on his mural for the French Line passenger ship company and again privately on another mural. Léger introduced her to Herbert Matter, the Swiss graphic designer and photographer whom she married in 1939. He also resided with the couple for a year sharing their studio and apartment.

The Matters were active in the emerging mid-century New York art scene, and contact with other artists was important to them. Close friends included Jackson Pollock, Lee Krasner, Franz Kline, Philip Guston, Alexander Calder and Willem de Kooning.

In 1943, the Matters moved to California. Matter was raising an infant son but the environment away from New York was affecting her work. She returned to New York in 1946.

Beginning in 1953, Matter taught at the Philadelphia College of Art (now University of the Arts) for 10 years, and then at the Pratt Institute for 10 years. She later taught at New York University for several years. She was a visiting critic at Antioch, Brandeis, Cincinnati School of Art, Kansas City Art Institute, Maryland Institute College of Art, Yale University, Skowhegan and American University in Washington, DC.

In 1964, she founded the New York Studio School of Drawing, Painting, and Sculpture. A year earlier, she wrote an article for ARTnews titled What's Wrong with U.S. Art Schools? in which she criticised the phasing out of extended studio classes. Such classes served the "painfully slow education of the senses," which she considered essential. The article prompted a group of Pratt students, as well as students from Philadelphia and one from Cooper Union, to ask Matter to form a school based on her ideas. The Studio School was originally housed in a loft on Broadway and gained almost immediate support from the Kaplan Fund, Mrs. John D. Rockefeller III and the Ford Foundation. It granted no degrees, offered only studio classes and emphasized drawing from life. Early teachers, chosen by the students, included the artists Philip Guston, Bradley Walker Tomlin, Charles Cajori, Louis Finkelstein and Sidney Geist; the art historian Meyer Schapiro; and the composer Morton Feldman. The school continues to train emerging artists.

The Matters lived on Macdougal Alley for years, where Mr. Matter had a studio in one of the eight small buildings that had housed the original locale of what is now the Whitney Museum of American Art.

In later life, the Matters moved to Long Island. Matter suffered a serious illness in 1979 and thereafter her husband became terminally ill. He died in 1984. She would later state that following his death, she coped by immersing herself in an intense period of work which became a sort of harvest of all the years of effort. She taught at the Studio School every other week and remained very much involved in its development. In addition to her art and teaching, she wrote articles on artists, including Hofmann, Kline and Giacometti. She wrote the text for a book of her husband's photographs of Giacometti, published in 1987, four years after his death.

Her work is included in the collection of the Whitney Museum of American Art.

Matter died on December 4, 2001.

In 2016 her biography was included in the exhibition catalogue Women of Abstract Expressionism organized by the Denver Art Museum.
