= Sidney Geist =

American artist

- Born: April 11, 1914; Paterson, New Jersey, U.S.
- Died: October 18, 2005 (aged 91); New York City, New York, U.S.
- Known for: Sculptor, writer, educator

Sidney Geist (April 11, 1914 – October 18, 2005) was an American artist. He was known for his sculpture and his art criticism.

== Biography ==
Geist was born April 11, 1914, in Paterson, New Jersey, and graduated from Eastside High School in 1931. He attended St. Stephen's College now Bard College, and the Art Students League of New York. For a time he worked as an apprentice with the sculptor Paul Fiene. He also worked for the Works Progress Administration's Federal Art Project from 1938 through 1940.

Geist served in the United States Army in Europe from 1944 through 1945, the final years of World War II. Geist returned to Europe after the war, attending the Académie de la Grande Chaumière and exhibiting at the Galerie Huit.

Geist was a writer, contributing to Art Digest, Artforum, and The New Criterion. He also wrote several books including Brancusi: A Study of the Sculpture (published by Grossman in 1968 ), and Interpreting Cézanne (published by Harvard University Press in 1988).

Geist taught at many universities including Brooklyn College, Pratt Institute, the University of California, Berkeley, and Vassar College. He was one of the founders of the New York Studio School of Drawing, Painting and Sculpture.

In 1975 Geist was the recipient of a Guggenheim Fellowship. He was a member of the American Abstract Artists. Geist died October 18, 2005, in New York City.

=== Death ===
Geist died October 18, 2005, in New York City.

=== Legacy ===
His papers are in the Archives of American Art at the Smithsonian Institution.
