= New York Studio School of Drawing, Painting and Sculpture =

Art school in Manhattan, New York

Coordinates: 40°43′57″N 73°59′50″W

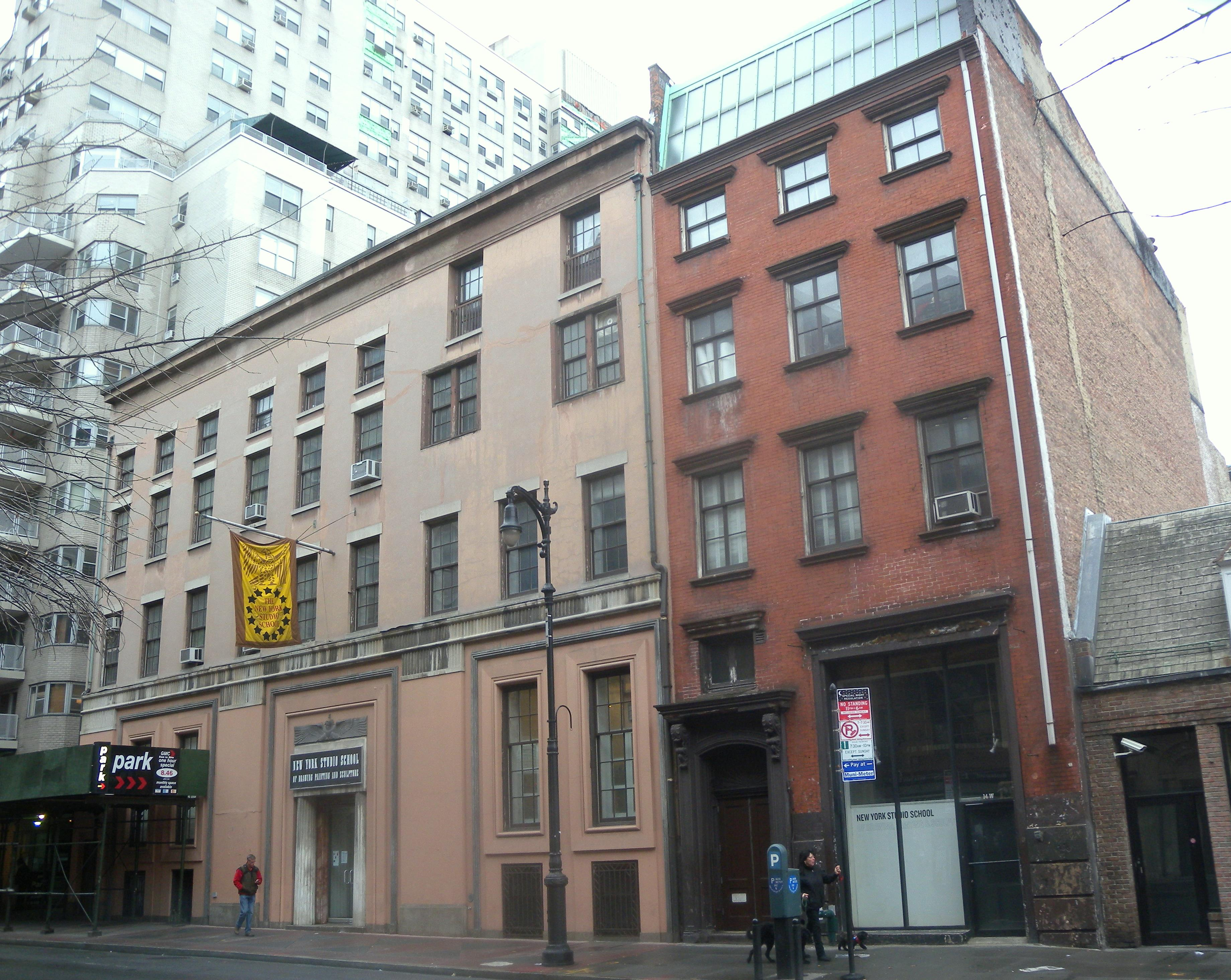
New York Studio School of Drawing, Painting and Sculpture at 8–14 West 8th Street, between Fifth Avenue and MacDougal Street in Greenwich Village. Site of the Whitney Museum of American Art's original location (at #8–12)

The New York Studio School of Drawing, Painting and Sculpture is an art school located at 8 West 8th Street in the Greenwich Village neighborhood of Manhattan in New York City, New York, US. It was formed in 1963 by a group of students and their teacher, Mercedes Matter, all of whom had become disenchanted with the fragmented nature of art instruction inside traditional art programs and universities. Today it occupies the building that previously housed the Whitney Museum of American Art.

From its start, the Studio School was founded on the principle that drawing from life should form of the basis of artistic development. Furthermore, rather than attending a series of disjointed classes, students were encouraged to develop their artistic practice along lines similar to the "atelier" approach favored by European art schools.

Faculty has included painters Charles Cajori, Louis Finkelstein, Philip Guston, Rosemarie Beck, Alex Katz, Earl Kerkam, George McNeil, and Esteban Vicente; sculptors Peter Agostini, Sidney Geist, Ophrah Shemesh, Reuben Nakian, and George Spaventa. Nicolas Carone and Mercedes Matter focused on drawing instruction and Meyer Schapiro and Leo Steinberg taught art history. Former deans of the school have included the renowned composer Morton Feldman and artist/critic/curator Robert Storr. Graham Nickson, the British-born painter who led the school for more than half its history, starting in 1988, instituted the two-week intensive Drawing Marathon, staged twice a year ahead of each semester and which is now fixture of the academic program. Nickson died on January 28, 2025 at 78 years old.

When founded, the school did not—by intention—offer formal degrees. However, today, students are able to obtain a Master of Fine Arts. The MFA program's first graduating class was in 2005.

The School presents an Evening Lecture Series in the Fall and Spring semesters, generally twice a week, featuring an international roster of speakers including artists talking on their own work and critics and scholars covering a range of historic subjects. The School's exhibition program, in its committed gallery space, was described by critic Mario Naves in the New York Observer as "one of the city's most significant venues for contemporary art." The school has greatly expanded its program since 1988, which now includes "painting excursions to Governors Island, museum and artist studio trips." The program has also expanded beyond its full-time student body, welcoming outside participants "including artists, historians, collectors, educators, journalists, and writers."

In 2005, the school was among 406 New York City arts and social service institutions to receive part of a $20 million grant from the Carnegie Corporation, which was made possible through a donation by New York City mayor Michael Bloomberg.

== History of the building ==
In 1914, in one of the many Manhattan properties Gertrude Vanderbilt Whitney and her husband owned, Gertrude Whitney established the Whitney Studio Club at 8 West 8th Street in Greenwich Village, next to her own MacDougal Alley studio. The club was intended as a facility where young artists could exhibit their works. When the Metropolitan Museum of Art rejected her offer in 1929 of a gift of new artworks, Whitney established the Whitney Museum of American Art, and in 1931 had architect Auguste L. Noel convert the three row houses at 8–12 West 8th Street into the museum's first home, as well as a residence for Whitney. In 1954, the museum moved uptown to new quarters, and the buildings, with the addition of #14, became the New York Studio School.

== Notable alumni ==
See New York Studio School Alumni.
