= Jacqueline Moss =

American art historian

Jacqueline E. Moss
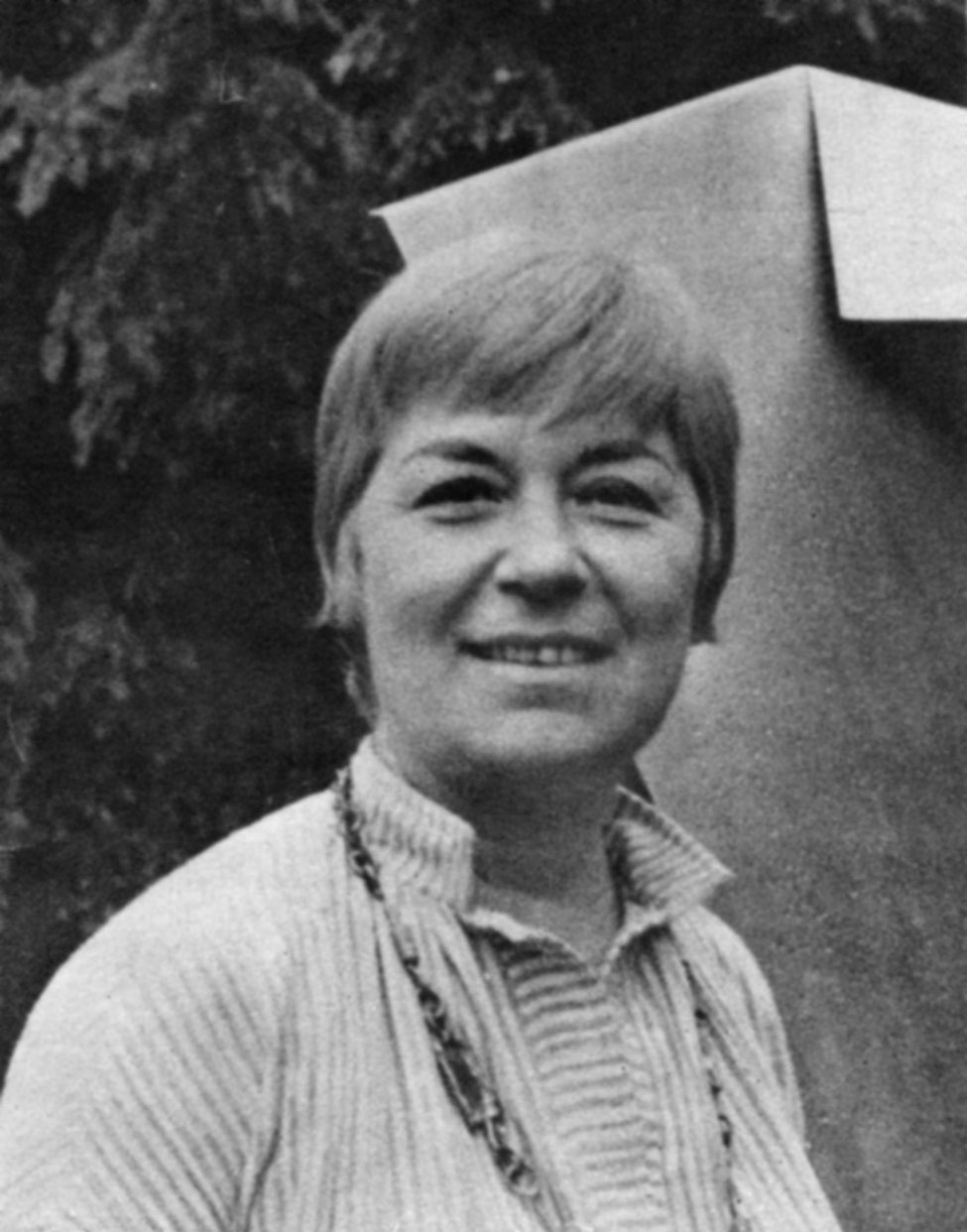
- Jacqueline Moss, ca. 1980
- Education: Cooper Union, Queens College
- Occupation: Art historian
- Parent(s): Ruth Brewer Eisenberg; Jacob Eisenberg

Jacqueline Moss (1927–2005) was an American art historian, lecturer, writer and art critic. She was the curator of education at the Aldrich Museum of Contemporary Art (since renamed) and lectured widely on modern and 20th-century art. Her articles and seminars often had a focus on women artists. In the 1980s, she had a travel business touring art and architecture in Europe, Asia and South America.

== Career ==
Moss was associated with the Aldrich Museum in Ridgefield, Connecticut for fifteen years. Larry Aldrich founded the museum to house his art collection of contemporary art. Moss gave seminars, lectured and later became curator of education. In 1977, she began leading specialized tour groups to Europe to visit private collections and artists' studios, as well as museums like the Dutch Kröller-Müller Museum in Otterlo, known for its extensive collection of paintings by Vincent van Gogh. In Norway, they visited a stave church in Borgund.

She taught at the University of Bridgeport and Housatonic Community College in Connecticut and lectured at the Kansas City Art Institute, The New School, Bard College and the Smithsonian Institution. Prior to teaching on the university level, she taught at the Daycroft School in Greenwich, Connecticut. She lectured on the art collection owned by Joseph Hirshhorn at his Greenwich estate and led tours of the sculpture garden before it was sent to Washington, D.C. to the Hirshhorn Museum, built to house his art collection. Moss was also the art critic at The Advocate and a contributor to The Christian Science Monitor and Arts Magazine, a monthly arts journal. Her article on Gertrude Greene was the cover story for the April 1981 issue of Arts. Many of her articles were about women artists. Moss was also interested in the women's movement and how it gave rise to new expression by women artists, such as Judy Chicago and May Stevens. At the Aldrich Museum, she curated a series on "Art by Contemporary Women Artists".

Jacqueline Moss with Joseph Hirshhorn at his Greenwich sculpture garden, 1970

She owned Jacqueline Moss Museum Tours, which led "special interest" tours of art and architecture around the world. Earlier trips went to European countries such as Spain, Italy, France, Greece, and Germany. She first went to China in 1982 just after the country began to welcome tourism. China was still quite impoverished and primitive. Many Chinese, even in major cities, had never seen western faces because China was closed following its 1949 revolution. Travel was restricted and tourism became essentially non-existent until after the death of Mao Zedong. By the time Moss returned just three years later, in 1985, tourism had grown from 230,000 in 1978 to 1.4 million foreigners and non-Asian faces in major cities were no longer a novelty. On the second trip to China, Moss and her group followed the Old Silk Route and visited the Mogao Caves. She also took groups to Egypt, Japan, Denmark, Norway, Sweden, Finland, the Soviet Union, Brazil, and other countries. In 1989, political unrest in China caused her to reschedule a return there.

Moss held a Bachelor of Fine Arts degree from the Cooper Union and received a Master's degree in art history from Queens College in 1980. Her thesis was on the art of Gertrude Greene and is archived at the Archives of American Art at the Smithsonian.

== Family ==
Moss was the daughter of Jacob Eisenberg, a musician and author of books and articles on piano. His last book, Let Me Help You, contained three photos of her, one as an infant, one as a toddler and one as a young girl playing a piano duet with her brother, Roger. Her mother was Ruth Brewer Eisenberg, "Ivory" of Ebony and Ivory, a piano duo of two grandmothers, one white and one black, who had had strokes and played together, one hand each.

== Selected publications ==
=== Catalogs ===
- Ida E. Rubin (Ed.) and Jacqueline Moss (text), Sculpture 76: An Outdoor Exhibition of Sculpture By Fifteen Living American Artists: Claes Oldenbourg, George Rickey, Forrest Myers, James Rosati, Reuben Nakian, Richard Fleischner, Lila Katzen, Tony Smith, Alexander Calder, Athena Tacha, Willem de Kooning, Richard Serra, George Segal, Charles Ginnever, Kuehn (1976). Greenwich Arts Council, Greenwich, Connecticut
- "Women Artists and Their Place in Modern Art History" in: American Art: American Women 1965 through 1985, introduction by Dorothy Mayhall (December 15, 1984 – February 23, 1985). Stamford Museum, Stamford, Connecticut

=== Articles ===
- "Gertrude Greene: Constructions of the 1930s and 1940s", Arts Magazine, Vol. 55, No. 8 (April 1981), pp. 120–127
- "Alberta Cifolelli", Arts Magazine, (April 1982)
- "Nancy Ketchman" Arts Magazine, (April 1984)
- "Juliet Holland", Arts Magazine, (April 1984)
- "Rebecca Welz", Arts Magazine, Vol. 60 (January 1985)
- "Linda Nisselson", Arts Magazine, (October 1987)

== See also ==
- Balcomb Greene
