= Jacob Eisenberg (musician) =

American pianist, teacher and author

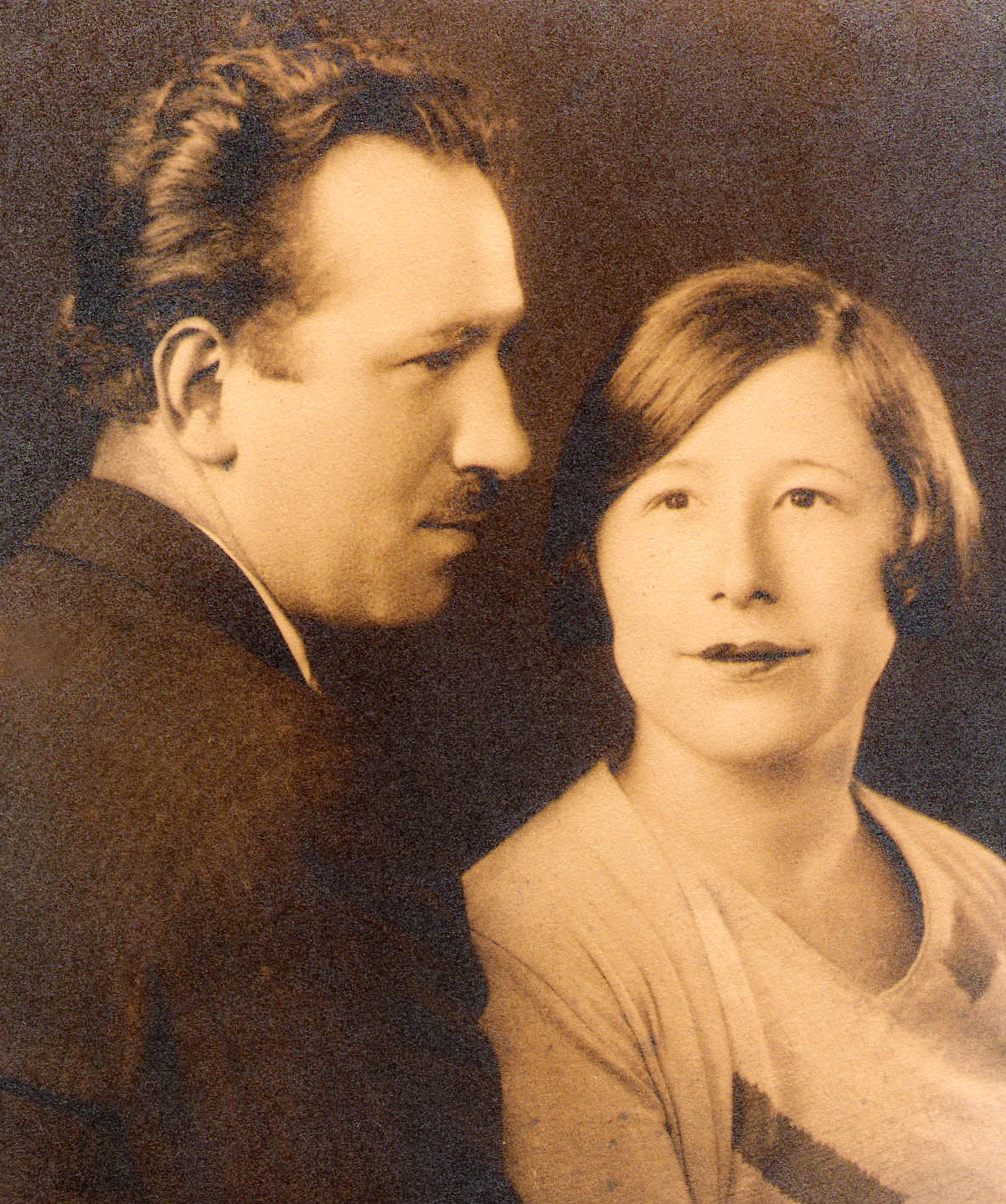
- Eisenberg with his wife
- Born: 1898; Alton, Illinois
- Died: 1964 (aged 65–66); Cliffside Park, New Jersey
- Occupations: Author, teacher, musician
- Spouse: Ruth Brewer Eisenberg
- Writing career
- Language: English
- Period: 1922 - 1964
- Subjects: piano, teaching piano
- Notable works: Weight And Relaxation Method For The Piano Forte and Natural Technics in Piano Mastery

Jacob Eisenberg (1898–1964) was an American pianist, teacher and author of books and articles on the piano. He was married to Ruth Brewer Eisenberg, "Ivory" of the piano duo, Ebony and Ivory.

== Musical accomplishments ==
Eisenberg wrote textbooks and articles on piano technique and interviewed major classical musicians, such as Vladimir de Pachmann, Leopold Godowsky and Vladimir Horowitz. He was a contributor to The Musician, an early 20th-century monthly magazine for music teachers and students. In an introductory note to Eisenberg's interview with Vladimir de Pachmann, the editor of The Musician wrote, "Jacob Eisenberg, author of Weight and Relaxation Method for the Piano and Etudes for the Development of the Principles of Weight and Relaxation in Piano Playing, is a recognized authority on Weight and Relaxation in Piano Playing. His books have a widespread circulation throughout the world and have aroused most favorable comment. While the real truth concerning Vladimir de Pachmann's much discussed 'Methode', has already appeared in The Musician, Mr. Eisenberg's further elucidation of the subject will be of interest to teachers and students."

Eisenberg interviewed Vladimir Horowitz on his first trip to the United States in January 1928. He was impressed with Horowitz, writing, "This remarkable young Russian, on his first visit to America, succeeded in having himself recorded in critical annals as the season's most important newcomer among pianists. He is twenty-four years old; Rachmaninoff is his favorite pianist; a conservative Boston audience jumped to its feet and cheered him not many weeks ago; he is now making a spring tour of Europe and will return to America in October for a two and a half months' tour."

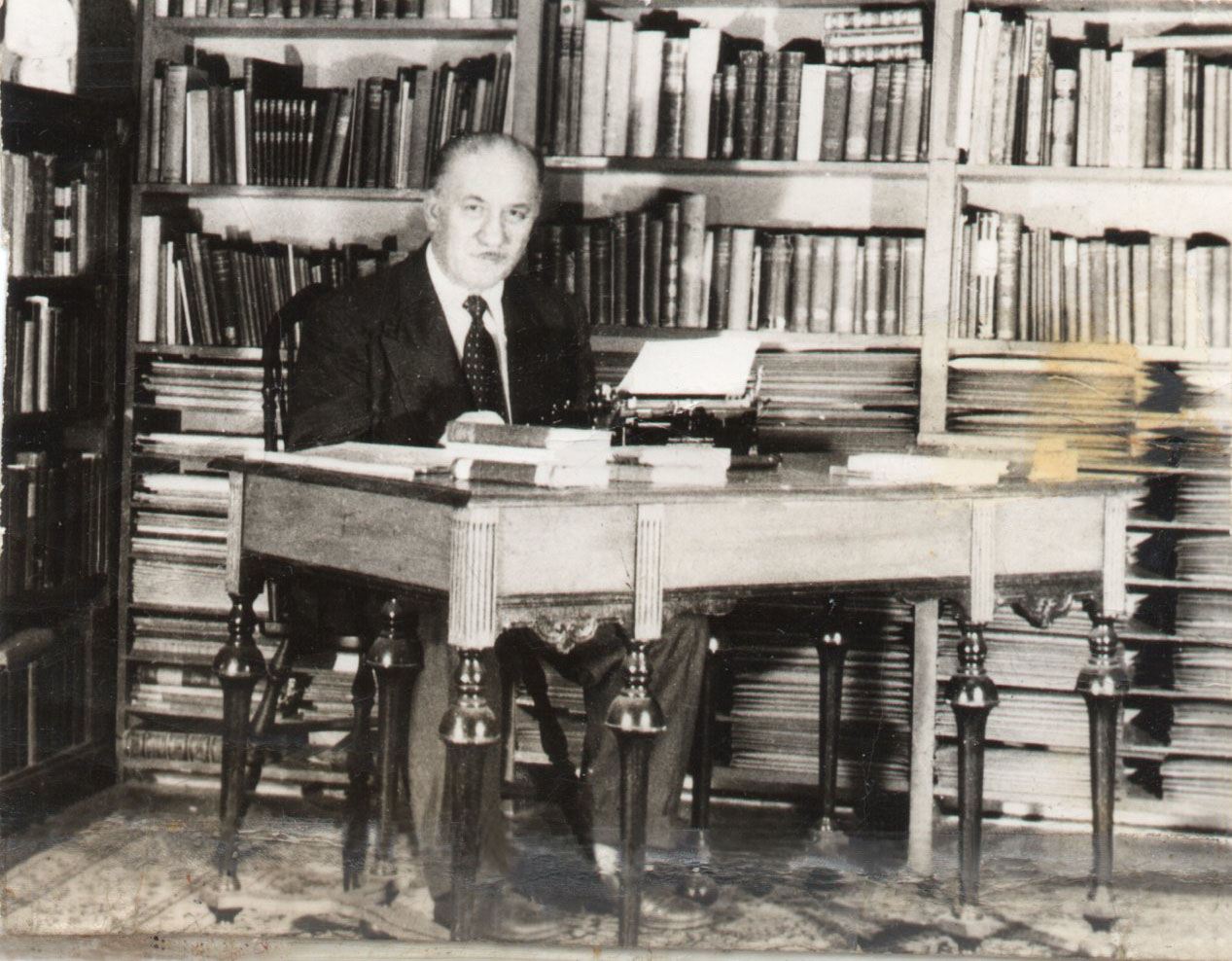
Eisenberg in his music library, 1958

Eisenberg married Ruth Brewer in 1923. Eisenberg saw his new wife as a "laboratory" where he could test his theories of technique and teaching piano. He pestered his wife to let him teach her piano, but she didn't like to practice. To get her to practice, he offered to do all the housework and she happily accepted. Piano became her passion. When Eisenberg went on a lecture tour of the United States, his wife came along to illustrate his methods to his lecture audiences. Playing the piano, she was visible proof that his teaching methods enabled the adult student to master the piano. The ability to play piano later became his wife's saving grace, after she suffered a stroke. Depressed about her physical state, she was introduced to Margaret Patrick (1913–1994), who had also just had a stroke, but on the other side, and also had a background in classical piano. The two were soon dubbed "Ebony and Ivory" and their story became known nationally and internationally. In an interview in McCall's magazine in 1986, Ruth Eisenberg said, "My husband was a wonderful teacher. I just wish he could see what I'm doing now with what he taught me."

Eisenberg's final book was published in 1964, the year of his decease. "Let Me Help You," an illustrated book written for young children, explains the history of the piano from the perspective of the instrument, with the stated goal of inspiring the young reader to practice. A photo of Eisenberg's children, Jacqueline and Roger, is used to illustrate the proper way to sit at the piano to practice. Eisenberg's personal papers and documents are archived at the International Piano Archives in College Park, Maryland.

== Books and articles by Jacob Eisenberg ==
- "Weight And Relaxation Method For The Piano Forte" (1922) ISBN 978-1-4446-5454-7
- "Etudes for the Development of the Principles of Weight and Relaxation in Piano Playing, Based on Hanon Book I, The Virtuoso Pianist" (1923) New York
- "De Pachmann Preaches Economy of Motion" The Musician, Vol. 29, No. 2 (February 1924). Accessed Feb. 18, 2010
- "Natural Technics in Piano Mastery" (1928) London, England
- "Horowitz Explains Accenting a Melody while Playing Chords" Interview with Vladimir Horowitz, The Musician (June 1928). Accessed Feb. 18, 2010
- "Piano Courses for Juniors" (1930) New York
- "Carnegie Series of Piano Lessons" (1931) New York
- "The Pianist" (1940) New York
- "Thumbnail Pictorial History of the Piano" (1950) New York
- "The 'Chord' in Monocord, Clavicord, Harpsicord and Vocal Cord" The Galpin Society Journal, Vol. 8, (March 1955), pp. 47–49. Accessed Feb. 18, 2010
- "Country Music Is More Popular than Classical Music" (1958) New York
- "Whence Cometh — Whither Goeth — That Music Called Jazz" (1962) New York
- "Let Me Help You" (1964) Jay-Roger Music Co., North Bergen, New Jersey
