= Ruth Brewer Eisenberg =

American pianist (1902–1996)

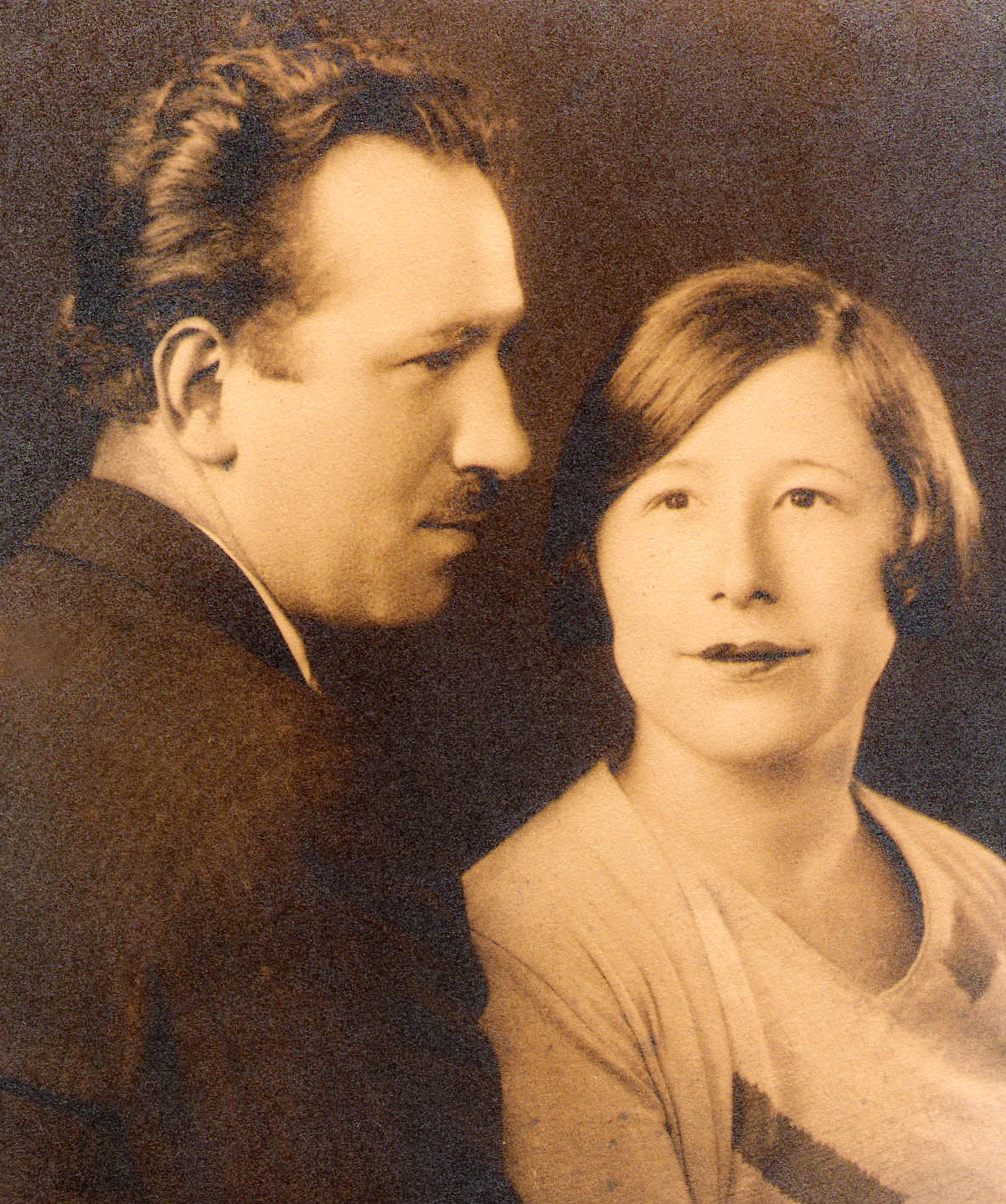
- With husband, ca. 1927–1928
- Occupation: Pianist
- Years active: 1983–1988
- Known for: Playing in piano duo, Ebony and Ivory
- Style: Classical
- Spouse: Jacob Eisenberg (musician)
- Partner: Margaret Patrick
- Relatives: Mendelson Joe (nephew)

Ruth Brewer Eisenberg (1902–1996) was "Ivory" of "Ebony and Ivory," the inter-racial piano duo. Eisenberg and Margaret Patrick, "Ebony," each had a stroke in 1982, which partially disabled them. Prior to the stroke, each had studied and played classical piano. Eisenberg was disabled on the left, Patrick on the right. They were introduced at a post-stroke group in Englewood, New Jersey by the program's director, who knew of their shared love for music and thought perhaps together, they could play as one. A reporter dubbed them "Ebony and Ivory" after the song by Paul McCartney and Stevie Wonder, which was then a hit.

== Biography ==
Eisenberg was born in New York in 1902 and grew up in West New York, New Jersey. At the age of eight, Eisenberg had a few piano lessons, but at 25¢, her parents felt they were too expensive and she didn't have enough talent, so her lessons were discontinued. In 1923, she married Jacob Eisenberg, a pianist, teacher and author. Eisenberg pestered his new wife to let him teach her how to play, but she didn't like to practice, so he agreed to do all the housework if she would practice the piano and she accepted the offer. Jacob wrote textbooks on piano technique and he wanted to use his wife to try out his methods. She toured the United States with him, playing at his lectures to demonstrate how adults could learn to master the piano using her husband's methods. After her husband died in 1964, she sold their piano, but later missed it and bought another one. The first day she had the new piano, she played for eight hours. In time, she was playing short concerts for local senior citizen groups.

In 1982, she had a stroke. Although she learned to walk again and was able to return to her apartment in Cliffside Park, New Jersey, she remained unable to use her left hand. In the spring of 1983, she began visiting a post-stroke group at Southeast Senior Center for Independent Living in Englewood, New Jersey. The program director introduced her to Margaret Patrick, a black great-grandmother who had also played classical music until 1982, when she also had a stroke.

The two of them began to play together, one hand each. They began practicing at the Senior Center and occasionally at Eisenberg's apartment. In May 1983, a senior citizen center in Teaneck, New Jersey asked them to play at a party. Their story appeared in local newspapers and they began getting invitations to play at other area hospitals and senior centers. A local reporter dubbed them Ebony and Ivory and the name stuck. They began to play in other senior citizen facilities, in veterans' homes and hospitals.

After being picked up by The New York Times, which put the story of "Ebony and Ivory" on its wire service, articles about them appeared in newspapers around the United States. They were on television both in the US and abroad and appeared with Regis Philbin, Geraldo Rivera and David Hartman. Liberace, who was a fan of Ebony and Ivory, made his last television appearance on the Hour Magazine with Gary Collins and made it a condition of his appearance that if they would bring Eisenberg and Patrick on the program, he would come. Newsman Morry Alter won an award for his CBS News report on them. They were featured on PM Magazine, CNN, and NBC Nightly News with Tom Brokaw.

Eisenberg and Patrick's story was included in a book by Norman Vincent Peale} and in More True Stories, an ESL reader in its third edition. It is included in sermons and religious publications in the US and other countries.

Eisenberg's daughter was the art historian Jacqueline Moss. Her nephew is Canadian artist and musician Mendelson Joe.

== Partial list of television and radio appearances ==
=== Television ===
- "New Jersey and You" WOR-TV (December 1983) Interview and performance
- "PM Magazine" (May 24, 1984) Performance
- "CBS News" (October 21, 1985) Interview with Morry Alter (won an award)
- "Good Morning America" with David Hartman, ABC (September 9, 1986) Interview
- *The Morning Show" with Regis Philbin, ABC (October 1986) Interview
- "Hour Magazine" with Gary Collins, (December 8, 1986) Interview and performance (Liberace's last television appearance)
- "NBC Evening News" with Tom Brokaw, "Assignment American: Ebony and Ivory" reported by Bill Schechner (May 6, 1988) News feature

=== Radio ===
- "The American Character" with Norman Vincent Peale, WOR (February 24, 1985) Feature in a special radio narration
- "Rambling with Gambling" with John Gambling, WOR (October 15, 1985) Interview
- "Morning Edition" with Karen Michel, NPR/WNYC (March 9, 1987) Interview
