= Michael Baker-Harber =

British sailor (1945–2022)

Personal information
- Full name: Michael James Baker-Harber
- Nationality: British
- Born: 4 October 1945 Uxbridge, United Kingdom
- Died: 25 June 2022 (aged 76)
- Height: 1.80 m (5 ft 11 in)

Sailing career
- Sport: Sailing
- Class: Soling

Michael James Baker-Harber (5 October 1945 – 25 June 2022) was a sailor from Great Britain, who represented his country at the 1976 Summer Olympics in Kingston, Ontario, Canada as crew member in the Soling. With helmsman Iain MacDonald-Smith and fellow crew member Barry Dunning, they took the 13th place.

== Early life and education ==
Baker-Harber was born at "Lindwell", Northwood, Middlesex, son of James Algerin Charles Baker-Harber (1905-1966) and Pam, née Orr. Baker-Harber's father worked for Marks and Spencer and other department stores including Handley's of Southsea as a display designer, being "a frequent winner of display competitions"; he had served with the Royal Air Force during the Second World War, and played for the (English) Nondescripts Cricket Club against Sidmouth in 1949. James Baker-Harber's former wife, Joyce (née Carter), subsequently married the aviator Robert Stanford Tuck.

Baker-Harber was educated at Tonbridge School.

== Career ==
Baker-Harber qualified as a solicitor, becoming partner at Ince & Co., and was president of the London Maritime Arbitrators Association from 2003 to 2006. He was a director of Coulouthros Ltd, a freight and cargo transportation company based in London, and represented Lloyd's of London on behalf of Ince & Co.

== Personal life ==
His daughter, Victoria, appeared on the reality show Made in Chelsea. She has two daughters with her partner, the American art dealer Inigo Philbrick, who in 2022 was jailed for wire fraud and ordered to pay $86.7 million. They married following his release from prison in 2024.

He lived on the High Street of Burnham-on-Crouch in Essex, and died on 25 June 2022.

== Sources ==
- "Michael Baker-Harber Bio, Stats, and Results". Olympic Sports. Sports-Reference.com. Archived from the original on 15 December 2012.
