= Mayhall =

Mayhall is an English surname. Notable people with the surname include:

- Dorothy Mayhall (1925–1995), American museum director and sculptor
- Jane Mayhall (1918–2009), American poet
