= Morton Myles =

American fashion designer (1929–2021)

Morton Solomon Myles (June 11, 1929 – June 23, 2021), was an American fashion designer in the 1960s-1980s.

== Early life and education ==
Myles was born in Manhattan, New York, the son of Jack Myles and Fannie-Deborah Chaikin Myles. With an interest in design, Myles entered New York University as a Freshman and then moved to the Fashion Institute of Technology where he earned a Bachelor of Arts in 1950. He double-majored in Fashion Design and Production Management. Next, Myles moved to Paris, France where he extended his education in couture dressmaking and design at the Chambre Syndicale and Ecole Guerre-Lavigne.

== Career ==
After completing his education in fashion design in both New York and Paris, Morton Myles became an assistant to couturier Jacques Fath in Paris. He then returned to Manhattan where he collaborated with designers Herbert Sondheim, Larry Aldrich and Abe Schrader. Morton Myles designs were sold in department stores such as Saks Fifth Avenue, Neiman Marcus, Lord & Taylor, Bergdorf Goodman and Marshall Field's.

=== Op Art ===
Morton Myles embraced the Op Art design movement in the 1960s mixing geometric fabrics with his chic, often sleeveless, mini dress designs. During this time, Myles designed under the label Jeunesse, French for youthfulness. Also referred to as Mod Design, Myles took approaches to the movement highlighting traditional garment components such as zippers and buckles. Traditionally, clothing components were hidden or kept invisible, Myles highlighted the use of industrial metals and using them as trim items in a new manner.

=== First Lady, Jacqueline Kennedy and the Good Friday Dress ===
Morton Myles's name became familiar when a young Jacqueline Kennedy was photographed in one of his designs on Good Friday in Palm Beach, Florida. The photograph featured the new First Lady, President Kennedy, Caroline Kennedy and their newborn son, John F. Kennedy Jr. The image type was new as the President’s wife was wearing a shorter, form-fitted and sleeveless dress which had not been done before. The dress cut was modern and sleek.

In a 2002 interview with Barbara Cloud, a columnist at the Post-Gazette, Myles recalled the story of how Mrs. Kennedy, then the wife of U.S. Senator Kennedy, visited the New York salon of Herbert Sondheim accompanied by Vogue’s Diana Vreeland in 1960. The two were searching for dresses of “splendid cut and color” as Myles recalled. Vreeland selected the dress which was a ready-to-wear, and sold to department stores at the wholesale price of $35.75. The Good Friday dress was one of two Morton Myles designs Kennedy purchased that day. Kennedy would be photographed in the dress again for the cover of Look Magazine by Richard Avedon.

The Good Friday dress now is in the permanent collection of the John F. Kennedy Presidential Library.

== Personal life and death ==
Myles' partner was John L. Otto.

Myles retired in the mid-1990s and moved to Scottsdale, Arizona. Morton Myles died on June 23, 2021, in Scottsdale.
