= Inigo Philbrick =

American former art dealer and convicted fraudster

- Born: Inigo August Philbrick; April 23, 1987 (age 39); Hackney, London
- Other name: Mini Madoff
- Citizenship: United Kingdom; United States
- Education: Joel Barlow High School
- Alma mater: Goldsmiths, University of London (no degree)
- Occupation: Former art dealer
- Criminal charges: Wire fraud (18 U.S.C. § 1348)
- Criminal penalty: Seven years imprisonment, plus two years supervised release and a fine of $86m
- Criminal status: Released
- Spouse: Victoria Baker-Harber (m. 2024)
- Partner: Francisca Mancini (2016)
- Children: 3
- Parent: Harry Philbrick

Inigo August Philbrick (born April 23, 1987) is a British-American former art dealer and convicted fraudster. According to the FBI, Philbrick committed the largest art fraud in American history. He was convicted of wire fraud in May 2022 and was sentenced to seven years in prison and was ordered to forfeit $86.7 million. He was released from Federal Correctional Complex, Allenwood on January 31, 2024, having served three and a half years of his sentence from his arrest on June 11, 2020.

== Early life ==
Inigo Philbrick was born in Hackney, London. He is the son of Harry Philbrick, who was the director of The Aldrich Contemporary Art Museum in Ridgefield, Connecticut, from 1996 to 2010, and Jane Polich Philbrick, a Barnard-educated playwright and artist. His maternal grandfather, Richard Polich, the son of Croatian immigrants, operated the Polich Tallix art foundry in Beacon, New York, which casts massive sculptures as well as the Oscar award statuettes.

Philbrick was educated at Joel Barlow High School in Redding, Connecticut, and graduated in 2005. He studied art at Goldsmiths, University of London, as his father did before him.

In Orlando Whitfield's 2024 book All That Glitters about his friendship with Philbrick, Whitfield describes how he and Philbrick tried to start their art dealer careers while still students by trying to buy Banksy paintings from a door and a wall of two London buildings. They were thwarted both times as others paid to buy the paintings before they could.

== Career ==
In 2006, Philbrick began an internship at London's White Cube gallery. He later became their head of secondary market sales at the gallery.

In October 2011, with backing from White Cube's owner, Jay Jopling, he set up Modern Collections at 89 Mount Street in London's Mayfair neighborhood, focusing on the secondary market for the work of contemporary artists. His first show included work by Kelley Walker and Wade Guyton (neither was a White Cube artist).

In 2013, Philbrick started his own business, and Jopling continued to provide him with financial support. Artists Philbrick traded included Rudolf Stingel, Christopher Wool, and Mike Kelley. Philbrick had galleries in London and Miami.

Philbrick was later determined to have engaged in various fraudulent practices. These practises included selling shares in a single piece of art to multiple investors resulting in the sold shares totaling more than 100 percent; selling artworks or using them as loan collateral without the knowledge of their owners; and providing "fraudulent" documents to "artificially inflate the value of artworks."

=== Arrest and imprisonment ===
By late 2019, a number of civil lawsuits were filed against Philbrick for fraud. In October of that year, he defaulted on a $14m loan and fled the United States to Australia, Japan, and New Caledonia. Eventually in 2020, he settled into hiding in Port Vila, Vanuatu. Acting on a request from the U.S. Embassy in Papua New Guinea, Minister Kalsakau subsequently signed a removal order allowing for his deportation from the South Pacific Ocean nation.

He had been a fugitive from justice in the United States since October 2019, and U.S. Federal law enforcement agents subsequently took the art dealer into custody apprehending him shopping at a market with partner Victoria Baker-Harber. He was taken immediately to Port Vila Airport and transported to Guam via Gulfstream V, to answer to a criminal complaint charging him with engaging in a multi-year scheme to defraud various individuals and entities in order to finance his art business.

Philbrick appeared in court via video link in Guam on June 15 where his charges of wire fraud and aggravated identity theft were read. Given his flight risk, the judge remanded him into custody and authorised Philbrick's transfer to the United States. American artist, academic and writer Kenny Schachter, who lost more than $1.5 million to Philbrick, called him a "very talented art dealer", a "mini Madoff" who had "sabotaged his entire life for short-term greed", and fell due to "a toxic mix of arrogance and alcohol". As early as May 2020, Schachter had written off Philbrick as "the Bernie Madoff of the art world".

After being incarcerated for nearly a year and a half, Philbrick pleaded guilty to one count of wire fraud on 18 November 2021 in the Southern District of New York. On 23 May 2022, he was sentenced by District Judge Sidney H. Stein to 84 months in prison, followed by two years of supervised release and ordered to pay $86m in fraud restitution. He served his sentence at Federal Correctional Complex, Allenwood, alongside criminals including Martin Shkreli and James Holmes. Philbrick was released from prison in early 2024, following four years incarceration.

In August 2025, the BBC released a two-part documentary about Philbrick, The Great Art Fraud, which included interviews with Philbrick and his wife.

== Personal life ==
In 2016 Philbrick met and began a relationship with Francisca Mancini, a "Buenos Aires–born art adviser turned perfume maker". They had a daughter together born in 2016.

Following release from prison, he married socialite Victoria Baker-Harber (daughter of Michael Baker-Harber), a regular on the British reality television show Made in Chelsea. The pair have a daughter, born in November 2020, and a second daughter, born in May 2025.
