= Ruby Lerner =

American arts executive

Ruby Lerner is an American arts executive. She ran Creative Capital, an arts foundation, from 1999 to 2016. Under her leadership, Creative Capital committed $40 million in financial and advisory support to 511 projects representing 642 artists. She stepped down from the organization in June 2016.

Beginning in January 2017, Lerner became the inaugural Herberger Institute Policy Fellow at Arizona State University and Senior Fellow to the Patty Disney Center for Life and Work at CalArts.

She serves on the board of directors for Light Industry in Brooklyn, New York. She is also on national advisory boards for the Headlands Center for the Arts in Sausalito, California; the McColl Center for Art + Innovation in Charlotte, North Carolina; the Ackland Art Museum at the University of North Carolina at Chapel Hill; the Thomas S. Kenan Institute for the Arts in Winston-Salem, North Carolina; The University of Kentucky Art Museum; and SPACE Gallery in Portland, Maine. She serves on the exhibition committee for the Aldrich Contemporary Art Museum in Ridgefield, Connecticut.

Lerner studied comparative religion at Goucher College in Towson, Maryland, where she currently serves on the Art Advisory Committee.

== Honors and awards ==
In 2016, Lerner was awarded honorary degrees from the Maryland Institute College of Art and Maine College of Art.

Lerner was a 30th Anniversary ArtTable Honoree (2011). She is recipient of the Art in General Visionary Award (2016), the John L. Haber Award from the University of North Carolina (2009), the Catalyst Award from the National Association of Artists' Organizations (2007), the BAXten Award from the Brooklyn Arts Exchange (2007), a Creative Leadership Award from the Alliance of Artists Communities (2005), the Artist Advocate Award from the Alliance of New York State Arts Organizations (2003) and a Special Citation from Artists Space for her support of individual artists (2003).
