= Karla Knight =

American artist (born 1958)

- Born: 1958 (age 67–68); New York City, US
- Education: BFA, Rhode Island School of Design
- Website: karlaknight.org

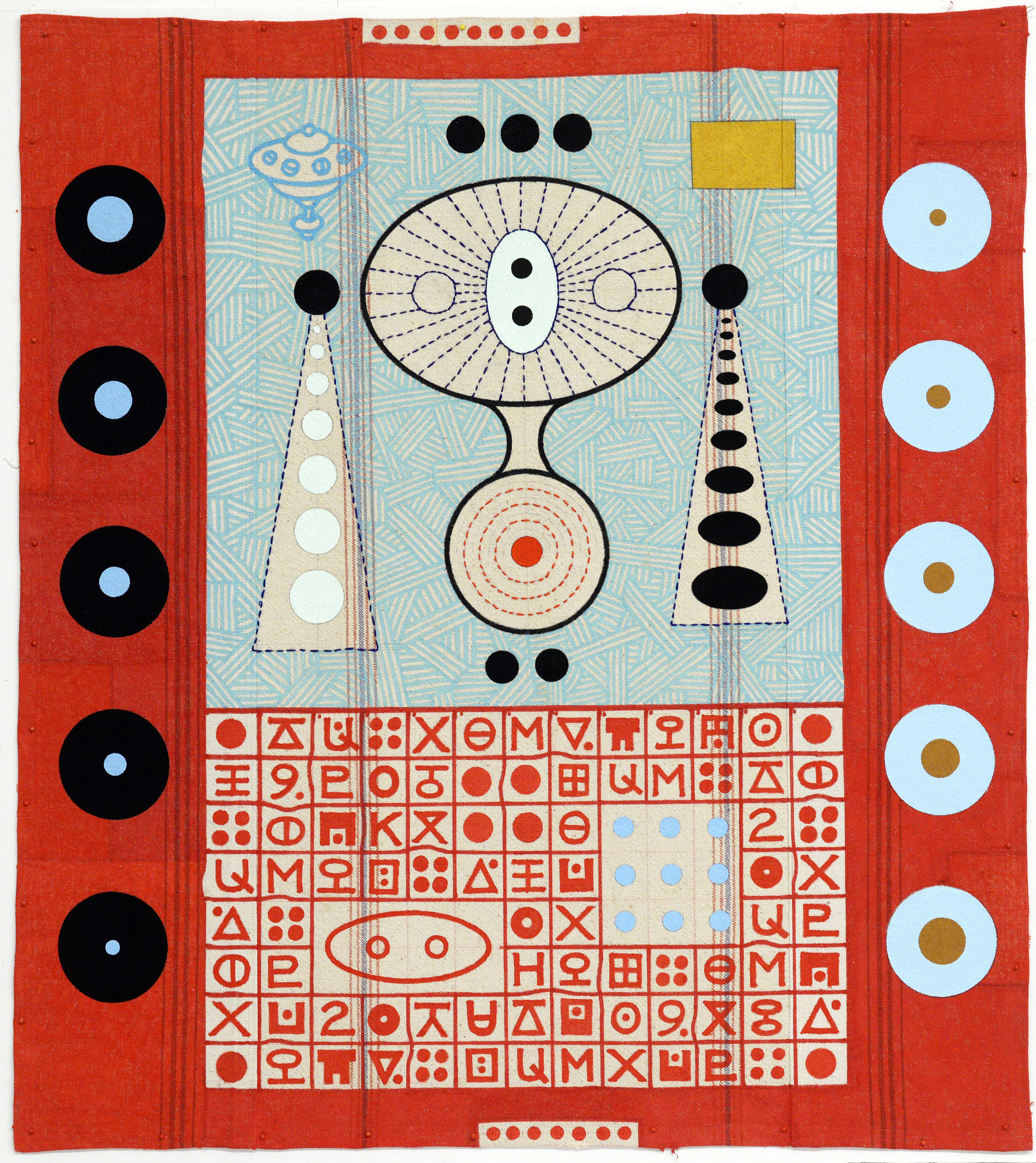
Karla Knight, Red Road Trip 2, tapestry, 2022

Karla Knight (born 1958) is an American artist. She was educated at the Rhode Island School of Design where she received a BFA degree in 1980.

In the 2021–2022 season, Knight had a solo exhibition at the Aldrich Museum of Contemporary Art in Ridgefield, Connecticut.

== Work ==
Knight has been influenced by the work of Hilma af Klint and Agnes Pelton, as well as early 20th century Surrealism. Her work addresses paranormal phenomena, the supernatural and the occult. Her paintings incorporate images of interlocking grids, futuristic spacecraft, and often include her own invented written language. Her work has been described as dealing with the themes of "otherworldliness, the occult, fascination with extraterrestrial life, and the language of the unknown."

In 2021, Knight had a one-person exhibition at the Aldrich Contemporary Art Museum. In 2025, Knight's work was included in the 12th Site Santa Fe Biennial where it was exhibited at the New Mexico Military Museum.

Writing in the Brooklyn Rail, artist and writer Ann McCoy reflects on the influence of Knight's father, a Ufologist who wrote several books on the subject. Knight herself cites Carl Jung as an influence, in particular his 1962 work Memories, Dreams, Reflections.

Knight's solo exhibition "Universal Remote" at Andrew Edlin Gallery was selected by art critic Jerry Saltz in his December 2023 culture round-up for New York Magazine, in which he wrote, "If any artist knows the secret language of aliens and seems able to channel them via intricate semi-geometric, almost hard-edged paintings, it is Karla Knight. Runes and letters spell out something about modernism via deep blue pigment that sings the music of the spheres."

Describing the works featured in a 2026 solo exhibition at Andrew Edlin Gallery, critic Annabel Keenan wrote, "To stand before one of Knight’s works is to experience a peculiar kind of attention, one that oscillates between scrutiny and surrender. Up close, the details proliferate: the texture of fabric, the delicacy of lines, the irregularity of hand-drawn characters that seem to embody subtly distinct personalities. Step back, and these elements cohere into something like a system, though one that never fully declares itself."

Critic Phillip Edward Spradley wrote of Knight's 2026 exhibition, "By the time one leaves Orbit, interpretation itself begins to feel secondary. What lingers instead are rhythms: the spacing of symbols, the density of marks, the repetition of circular forms, the sensation of moving through a system that continually opens outward rather than closing in. Knight’s work ultimately proposes a slower mode of attention, one in which meaning emerges not through resolution but through sustained looking. I could argue, the exhibition’s real subject may not be aliens, ancient civilizations, or the cosmos at all, but perception itself: the strange human urge to keep searching the sky and the ground for signs that we are not alone, not first, not finished. Like many aspects of life, paying attention pays off. Here, it pays in wonder."

== Collections ==
Her work is represented in the permanent collections of the Brooklyn Museum, the Museum of Modern Art, the Walker Art Center, among other venues.
