= Margaret Patrick =

American musician

- Born: 1913
- Died: 1994
- Musical career
- Occupation: Musician
- Instrument: Piano

Margaret Patrick (1913–1994) was "Ebony" in Ebony and Ivory, the name given to a pair of great-grandmothers in New Jersey, one white and one black, who played classical piano together. Each had a stroke in 1982 and became partially disabled. They were introduced to one another the following year and began playing piano together, one hand each. A reporter covering their story dubbed them "Ebony and Ivory" after the 1982 hit song by Paul McCartney and Stevie Wonder.

== Biography ==
Patrick grew up in Harlem and started playing the piano at the age of eight and immediately fell in love with it. At the age of ten, she began to accompany her sister, who played violin and by the time she was twelve, she was accompanying local singers and orchestras. In 1929, aged 16, she graduated from the Martin Smith Conservatory of Music and was awarded a gold medal for having passed her piano and theory classes with honors.

Patrick married in 1933 and became a piano teacher and taught for 50 years. She continued accompanying singers and orchestras. She also played the organ and conducted the choir of a Presbyterian church in the Bronx. At one point, she directed a choir that sang with Duke Ellington and his orchestra, a highpoint in her life. "I felt elated to work with him," she told McCall's magazine. In January 1982, she had a stroke that left her disabled on her right side and unable to speak. After months in the hospital, she returned to her home in Englewood, New Jersey, able to speak a little bit, but unable to move her right hand enough to play the piano.

In late 1982, Patrick began going for therapy at Southeast Senior Center for Independent Living. In early 1983, the program director introduced her to Ruth Eisenberg, another great-grandmother who also had a stroke in 1982. She had seen Eisenberg sitting at the piano, playing with one hand and looking depressed. Patrick said, "She told us: 'You have something in common, the piano. Put your two good hands and your heads together, and see what you can come up with.' " Eisenberg added, "Immediately we got to talking about Chopin. And then we sat down at the piano and played Chopin's 'Minute Waltz'. I played the treble with my right hand; she played the bass with her left." They happily discovered they knew the same music.

They began practicing at the Senior Center and occasionally at Eisenberg's apartment. In May 1983, a senior citizen center in Teaneck, New Jersey asked them to play at a party. Their story appeared in local newspapers and they began getting invitations to play at other area hospitals and senior centers. A local reporter dubbed them Ebony and Ivory and the name stuck. They began to play in other senior citizen facilities, at veterans' homes and hospitals.

Their story went national after being picked up by The New York Times, which put it on its wire service. They were on television both in the US and abroad and appeared with Regis Philbin, Geraldo Rivera and David Hartman. Liberace, who was a fan of "Ebony and Ivory", made his last television appearance on the Hour Magazine with Gary Collins and made it a condition of his appearance that if they would bring Patrick and Eisenberg on the program, he would come. Newsman Morry Alter won an award for his CBS News report on them. They were featured on PM Magazine, CNN and NBC Nightly News, with Tom Brokaw.

Patrick and Eisenberg's story was included in a book by Norman Vincent Peale and in More True Stories, an ESL reader in its third edition. It is included in sermons and religious publications in the US and other countries.

== Partial list of television and radio appearances ==
Television

- New Jersey and You, WOR-TV (December 1983). Interview and performance
- PM Magazine (May 24, 1984). Performance
- CBS News (October 21, 1985). Interview with Morry Alter (won an award)
- Good Morning America with David Hartman, ABC (September 9, 1986). Interview
- The Morning Show with Regis Philbin, ABC (October 1986). Interview
- Hour Magazine with Gary Collins (December 8, 1986). Interview and performance (Liberace's last television appearance)
- NBC Evening News with Tom Brokaw, "Assignment American: Ebony and Ivory" reported by Bill Schechner (May 6, 1988). News feature

Radio

- The American Character with Norman Vincent Peale, WOR (February 24, 1985). Feature in a special radio narration
- Rambling with Gambling with John Gambling, WOR (October 15, 1985). Interview
- Morning Edition with Karen Michel, NPR/WNYC (March 9, 1987). Interview

== Sermons and religious articles ==
- Sermon St Cuthbert's Parish Church, Lothian Road, Edinburgh, Scotland. Accessed February 19, 2010
- Sermon (April 8, 2001). Accessed February 18, 2010.
- Church newsletter (PDF) Calvary Lutheran Church, Thunder Bay, Ontario, Canada (February 2010). Accessed February 19, 2010.
- Sermon (PDF) First Baptist Church, Mountlake Terrace, WA, November 11, 2007. Accessed February 19, 2010.
- Article Nadbiskupijski Center for Youth Ministry, Sarajevo. Accessed February 19, 2010. (in Bosnian)
