= Philadelphia Contemporary =

Arts organization in Pennsylvania, US

- Established: 2016
- Location: Philadelphia, Pennsylvania
- Coordinates: 39.96814°N 75.14153°W
- Founder: Harry Philbrick
- Website: philadelphiacontemporary.org

Philadelphia Contemporary is an arts organization that commissions and presents contemporary visual art, performance art, and spoken word. It was founded in 2016 with the intention to build a new non-collecting museum in Philadelphia for contemporary art in all of its forms. Philadelphia Contemporary organizes exhibitions and events through partnerships and space-borrowing with institutions such as the Barnes Foundation, Delaware River Waterfront Corporation, the Brandywine River Museum of Art, and Philadelphia Parks & Recreation.

In 2018, Philadelphia Contemporary announced that the architecture firm Johnston Marklee would design their new building.
