= Ebony and Ivory (piano duo) =

American piano duo

Ruth Eisenberg and Margaret Patrick playing piano, using one hand each.

Ebony and Ivory was the name given to two elderly women in New Jersey, one white and one black, who played classical piano together. Both had experienced a stroke in 1982 and became partially disabled. Ruth Eisenberg and Margaret Patrick were introduced to each other the following year and began playing piano together, one hand each. A reporter covering their story dubbed them Ebony and Ivory after the 1982 hit song by Paul McCartney and Stevie Wonder.

== Background ==
Margaret Patrick (1913–1994) grew up in Harlem and started playing the piano at the age of eight. She accompanied singers and orchestras from the time she was a young girl and was often called on to play the piano while in high school. At the age of 16, she graduated with honors from the Martin Smith Conservatory of Music. After getting married in 1933, she continued accompanying singers and orchestras. She also taught piano and conducted a church choir in the Bronx. One of the highpoints in her work was directing a choir that once sang with Duke Ellington and his orchestra. In January 1982, she had a stroke that left her disabled on her right side and unable to speak. After months in the hospital, she returned to her home in Englewood, New Jersey, able to speak a little bit, but unable to move her right hand enough to play the piano.

Ruth Brewer Eisenberg (1902–1996) played piano for many years. She had a few lessons as a young child, but they were early discontinued. After getting married in 1923, she was taught by her husband, Jacob Eisenberg, a pianist, teacher and author. He wanted to try out his teaching methods on his wife, but she hated practicing. In order to get her to practice, he promised to do all the housework for her and she agreed. Later, she accompanied him on a lecture tour of the United States, playing the piano to illustrate her husband's piano technique and how his methods could help an adult learn to play the piano. After his death in 1964, she sold their piano, but later missed having it and she bought another one, playing for eight hours the first day. She began to give short concerts to area senior citizen groups, but these were cut short in November 1982, when she had a stroke. She was in therapy for months and although she learned to walk again, she remained disabled on her left side. She was, however, able to return to her apartment in Cliffside Park, New Jersey.

In late 1982, Patrick began going for therapy at Southeast Senior Center for Independent Living. Eisenberg started coming in early 1983, and a month later, the program director saw Eisenberg, depressed, fiddling at the piano with one hand. Eisenberg told McCall's, "I was doodling at the piano ... with one hand, feeling sorry for myself, wishing I were dead. I didn't want to talk to anyone. Then Millie [the program director] walks up behind me with Margaret and tells me that she plays the piano and says, 'Why don't you two try to get together?' And immediately we got to talking about Chopin. And then we sat down at the piano and played Chopin's 'Minute Waltz'. I played the treble with my right hand; she played the bass with her left. I was elated to play my music again, and we found out we knew all the same pieces."

They began practicing at the Senior Center and occasionally at Eisenberg's apartment. In May 1983, a senior citizen center in Teaneck, New Jersey asked them to play at a party. Their story appeared in local newspapers and they began getting invitations to play at other area hospitals and senior centers. A local reporter dubbed them Ebony and Ivory and the name stuck. They began to play in other senior citizen facilities, at veterans' homes and hospitals.

== International human interest story ==
Their story went national after being picked up by The New York Times, which put it on its wire service. They were on television both in the US and abroad and appeared with Regis Philbin, Geraldo Rivera and David Hartman. Liberace, who was a fan of "Ebony and Ivory", made his last television appearance on the Hour Magazine with Gary Collins and made it a condition of his appearance that if they would bring Eisenberg and Patrick on the program, he would come. Newsman Morry Alter won an award for his CBS News report on them. They were featured on PM Magazine, CNN and NBC Nightly News, with Tom Brokaw.

Eisenberg and Patrick's story was included in a book by Norman Vincent Peale and in More True Stories, an ESL reader in its third edition. It is included in sermons and religious publications in the US and other countries.

== Partial list of television and radio appearances ==
=== Television ===
- "New Jersey and You" WOR-TV (December 1983) Interview and performance
- "PM Magazine" (May 24, 1984) Performance
- "CBS News" (October 21, 1985) Interview with Morry Alter (won an award)
- "Good Morning America" with David Hartman, ABC (September 9, 1986) Interview
- *The Morning Show" with Regis Philbin, ABC (October 1986) Interview
- "Hour Magazine" with Gary Collins, (December 8, 1986) Interview and performance (Liberace's last television appearance)
- "NBC Nightly News" with Tom Brokaw, "Assignment American: Ebony and Ivory" reported by Bill Schechner (May 6, 1988) News feature

=== Radio ===
- The American Character with Norman Vincent Peale, WOR (February 24, 1985) Feature in a special radio narration
- Rambling with Gambling with John Gambling, WOR (October 15, 1985) Interview
- Morning Edition with Karen Michel, NPR/WNYC (March 9, 1987) Interview

== Sermons and religious articles ==
- Sermon, St Cuthbert's Parish Church, Lothian Road, Edinburgh, Scotland. Accessed Feb. 18, 2010
- Sermon (April 8, 2001) Accessed Feb. 18, 2010
- Church newsletter (PDF) Calvary Lutheran Church, Thunder Bay, Ontario, Canada (February 2010). Accessed Feb. 18, 2010
- Sermon (PDF), First Baptist Church, Mountlake Terrace, WA (November 11, 2007). Accessed Feb. 18, 2010
- Religious article, Nadbiskupijski Center for Youth Ministry, Sarajevo. Accessed Feb. 18, 2010 (in Bosnian)
