= Harry Philbrick =

American art curator

Harry Lyman Philbrick (born September 25, 1958) is an American art curator who is the founding director of the nonprofit arts organization Philadelphia Contemporary. He is Interim Executive Director at the Fabric Workshop and Museum. From 2011 to 2016, he was Director of the Museum at the Pennsylvania Academy of the Fine Arts (PAFA), and previously worked as Director of The Aldrich Contemporary Art Museum from 1996 to 2010.

At PAFA, Philbrick developed community education programs and increased the amount of contemporary art in the museum's collection and exhibitions. Philbrick started at The Aldrich Museum as Director of Education, developing a student docent program that trained young people to lead tours for their peers. Under Philbrick’s directorship, the Aldrich Museum expanded its exhibition space and created an education center and sculpture garden.

He is the father of Inigo Philbrick, who was convicted of wire fraud in May 2022, sentenced to seven years in prison, and ordered to forfeit $86.7 million, for what has been described as the largest art fraud in American history.

Curated or co-curated exhibitions including:

- Living With Contemporary Art (1996, ISBN 978-1-888332-00-1)
- The Nude in Contemporary Art (1999, ISBN 978-1-888332-10-0)
- Ann Hamilton: Whitecloth (1999, ISBN 978-1-888332-09-4)
- Faith: The Impact of Judeo-Christian Religion on Art at the Millennium (2000, ISBN 978-1-888332-12-4)
- Janine Antoni: The Girl Made of Butter (2001, ISBN 1888332158)
- Contemporary Erotic Drawing (2005, ISBN 978-1-888332-24-7)
- Anselm Kiefer: Velimir Chlebnikov and the Sea (2006, ISBN 1888332298)
- Voice & Void: Hall Curatorial Fellow Exhibition (2008, ISBN 188833231X)
- Dive Deep: Eric Fischl and the Process of Painting (2012, ISBN 0943836417)
