= Ince & Co =

Defunct international commercial law firm

Ince
- Headquarters: London
- No. of offices: 21
- No. of employees: 700
- Major practice areas: General Practice
- Key people: Donald Brown (Chief Executive); Simon Howard (Chairman)
- Revenue: ▼£97.0 million (2021/22)
- Date founded: 1866
- Dissolved: 2023
- Website: www.inceco.com/en

Ince & Co was a United Kingdom-based holding company with a core business in legal services, which was listed on the London Stock Exchange. The company also offered complementary services in accounting, financial services, consulting, and pensions advice. It was previously known as Ince Gordon Dadds LLP, following the acquisition of Ince & Co by Gordon Dadds Group LLP, and rebranded as The Ince Group in August 2019.

In 2022, The Ince Group ranked 47th in The Lawyer UK 200 list, with £100.2 million in revenue during the previous year. As of 2021, the firm operated in 9 countries and had 21 offices, and employed over 700 employees worldwide, including support staff. The chief executive officer was Donald Brown, while the non-executive chairman was Simon Howard.

In May 2023, Axiom DWFM purchased the firm out of administration and reverted its name to Axiom Ince. Axiom Ince then acquired Plexus Law from administration on 7th July 2023. In August 2023, the SRA suspended three directors of Axiom Ince — Pragnesh Modhwadia, Idnan Liaqat, and Shyam Mistry — amid allegations of a £64m fraud. On 3 October 2023, the Solicitors Regulation Authority intervened to close down Axiom Ince. The intervention is among the largest and potentially the most expensive in SRA's history.

== History ==
In 2017, Gordon Dadds LLP became the second law firm to list on the Alternative Investment Market (AIM) of the London Stock Exchange, raising £20 million, two years after Gateley became the first UK law firm to have an IPO. The Legal Services Act of 2007, which went into force in 2012, had made it possible for non-lawyers to own or invest in law firms organised as "alternative business structures". In 2018, Gordon Dadds acquired Metcalfes Solicitors in Bristol.

In early 2019, Gordon Dadds LLP acquired the UK and Chinese businesses of Ince & Co for an estimated £21 million in consideration, creating the largest publicly traded law firm in the UK based on revenue at the time, until DWF went public in March of that year. Both Gordon Dadds and Ince & Co were well established in the field of insurance law. Gordon Dadds was known for resolving large and complex disputes in the London and international markets, and had a private client and family practice, while Ince & Co was a network of international commercial law firms, specialising in the shipping and insurance sectors, as well as energy and aviation.

Six months into the merger, the firm rebranded the name of most of its legal businesses, including most of its international offices, to "Ince"; only its private client business then in Mayfair retained the name "Gordon Dadds". For its financial year 2020, the combined firm reported an 87% increase in revenue, followed by a slowdown in growth in subsequent years. On 13 March 2022, the firm's IT team shut down its servers after detecting a cyber attack; in April, it was granted an injunction to deter hackers from leaking its data online.

In April 2023, Ince Gordon Dadds filed for administration while Donald Brown reportedly attempted to reclaim the firm. Less than one month later, the firm was purchased by Axiom DWFM and operated under the former name "Ince & Co." All former Ince employees were re-hired.

== Notable lawyers ==
- Marie van der Zyl, employment lawyer and 48th president of the Board of Deputies of British Jews
- Lewis Pugh, former maritime lawyer who left Ince & Co to become an endurance swimmer and ocean advocate
- Philippe Ruttley, former EU and competition head at Ince who moved to Keystone Law
- Michael Baker-Harber, also an Olympic sailor for Great Britain, who as a partner at Ince & Co. represented Lloyd's of London.
