= International Moot Competition on Maritime Arbitration =

International Moot Competition on Maritime Arbitration (IMCMA) is a moot court competition for law students which is organized by the Centre for International Law and Justice starting from 2010. The contest is called to demonstrate disputable and important issues of private international law and in particular maritime law and international arbitration. The final round of International Moot Competition on Maritime Arbitration (IMCMA) is held in Odesa in the building at the Odesa Commercial Court of Appeal The language of the IMCMA is English.

The purpose of the IMCMA is to provide the law students an opportunity to develop knowledge in maritime arbitration and to develop their abilities to persuade as well as their written and oral advocatory techniques.

== Dispute ==
The "case" is a fictional dispute which normally arises between carrier and shipper or their agents. The compromise (i.e. the case) contains the most significant facts from the dispute and participants are not permitted to add new information. International Moot Competition on Maritime Arbitration is based on purely hypothetical problem therefore everything with the problem has no any relation to any legal or physical person. The Moot Competition Case is made solely for the purpose to train the law students

=== Applicable law ===
The case contains also a link to the applicable law which is indicated in arbitration clause (most of the times its English Law, Hague Rules or Hague-Visby Rules) and quotes from the contract or correspondence between the parties.

== Procedure ==
The International Moot Competition on Maritime Arbitration is a simulation of the work of London Maritime Arbitrators Association (LMAA) and is designed on the basis of the London Maritime Arbitrators Association Terms.

Each law school may be presented only by one team. Teams should be composed of two to four law students and may be accompanied by a couch. Each member of the team must contribute to the team`s brief and must argue during at least one round of the competition.

The competition is divided into two parts.

=== Written part ===
Till the 12th of February (the day of foundation of the LMAA), participants must send memoranda (written position of applicant and respondent) to the Organizing Committee. In their memoranda a team should cover issues from the dispute and ask the arbitrators their for satisfying their demands. The written work should contain inter alia links to the applicable law and practice of arbitration courts (optionally).

The Written Memorandum must be no longer than 25 double spaced A4 typed pages.

A committee of experienced arbitrators shall score all Written Memoranda submitted and shall select the best of the each Claimant and Defendant in the Moot Competition Competition. The score should base on the following points: knowledge of facts and law, proper and articulate analysis, extent and use of research, clarity and organization, correct formats and citation, grammar and style.

=== Oral part ===
Representatives of the applicants or respondents (1 or 2 persons) have in total 40 minutes for presenting their position, answering questions of arbitrators (optionally) and rebuttal (or sub rebuttal). The speech should be convincing, logical and based on the applicable law, practice of arbitration courts or other legal sources.

The Schedule for the preliminary rounds will be posted on the Moot Competition Website by the 1 March. Each team will compete in two preliminary rounds arguing for Claimant and Defendant once. The team will receive comments and feedback from the arbitrators at the close of each round. The Semi Final and Final Rounds shall take place according to the announced schedule. Two teams shall progress to the Final Round.

The oral arguments need not be confined to the issues presented in the Written Memorandum. Each presentation will be valued according to the following criteria: knowledge of facts and law, logic and reasoning to apply the legal principles, ingenuity and ability to answer questions, time management and organization, court etiquettes, persuasiveness.

== Rules ==
Revised Rules together with the Compromise appear of the official site of the Centre for International Law and Justice in the beginning of September.

== See also ==
- Admiralty law
- Moot court
- London Maritime Arbitrators Association
