= Larry Aldrich =

American fashion designer

- Born: June 13, 1906; Manhattan, New York, United States
- Died: October 26, 2001 (aged 95)
- Occupation: fashion designer
- Known for: Aldrich Contemporary Art Museum

Larry Aldrich (June 13, 1906 – October 26, 2001) was an American fashion designer, art collector, and founder of the Aldrich Contemporary Art Museum in Ridgefield, Connecticut.

== Life ==
Aldrich began working in the fashion trade in 1924. He began producing garments under his own label in the 1940s. He was president of the New York Couture Group.

He began collecting art in 1937. Initially, it was just a circumstantial act and not from any avid interest. He was married in 1940. He and his wife bought a weekend home in Ridgefield, Connecticut. His wife had an interest in painting and, concerned about her boredom during the week while he was in New York, he began bringing home literature about art, which he himself began to read. At the conclusion of World War II, air travel to Europe eventually resumed. Aldrich had already decided that he would like to acquire some art. In 1947, Aldrich and his wife flew to Paris with the intention of buying an Utrillo.

His collection grew to be substantial. On his way out to buy cigarettes one day in Ridgefield, Connecticut he spied a building for sale on Main Street. Seeing that it had high ceilings, he thought it would work well as a place to house his extensive art collection. After investing a substantial sum to renovate, he turned it into a museum, initially called the "Old Hundred", after the name of the building. He soon changed it, however, because the name did not indicate the contemporary character of the contents.

He founded the Larry Aldrich Museum in 1964. The Museum previously awarded an annual Larry Aldrich Award, honoring contemporary visual artists who had made an impact on contemporary art world in the previous three years.

His fashion house designed the volunteer docent uniforms for the City Art Museum of St. Louis in 1968.

== See also ==
- Dorothy Mayhall
- Jacqueline Moss
