= Dorothy Mayhall =

American sculptor

- Born: 1925
- Died: 1995 (aged 69–70)
- Known for: Sculpture, Museum Administration

Dorothy Mayhall (1925–1995) was an American museum director and sculptor. She worked at art museums in New York and Connecticut, primarily exhibiting contemporary art.

== Early years ==
Mayhall hailed from Oregon. She went to high school in Omaha, Nebraska, where she was an honors student and worked on the yearbook. She earned her undergraduate degree from the University of Iowa.

Unable to make a living from her sculpting, she went back to college and got a master's degree in art history. She was awarded a Fulbright scholarship and went to Paris, France. When her funds ran out, she returned to the United States and got a job at the University of Omaha. Determined to escape what she felt was a "cultural desert", she enlisted in the Women's Army Corps for two years. After the period was over, she was told that if she remained in the Corps, she could be sent to the place of her choice, anywhere in the world, so she re-enlisted and went to Japan. While there, she visited museums, learned about oriental art and met Japanese artists, calling the time a "fabulous experience".

== Career ==
Once released from active duty in the army, she moved to New York and got a job at the Museum of Modern Art after working briefly at Time-Life.In the mid-1960s, Larry Aldrich offered her the job of director at his new museum in Ridgefield, Connecticut. She was the first director of the "Old Hundred", as the museum was briefly called. The name was changed to the Aldrich Museum of Contemporary Art before being changed again to its present name. Mayhall stayed at the Aldrich Museum for six years before leaving to work at Storm King. She later returned to the Aldrich.

Through a mutual friend, she met Ralph E. Ogden and his wife, who had built Storm King, and they became friends. Mayhall became the director of the Storm King Art Center in 1972. Located in upstate New York, about an hour north of New York City, it had few galleries, but had extensive grounds suitable for displaying monumental art. Part of Mayhall's job was to organize the installation of art that weighed tons. (Note: One of the pieces in the sculpture garden at Storm King stood 50 feet (15 m) tall, another weighed 44 tons (40 metric tons).)

Mayhall had a solo exhibition of her own work at the Sachs Gallery in New York in 1972.

Mayhall's last job was director of art at the Stamford Museum and Nature Center in Stamford, Connecticut, where she worked for 12 years. At the Stamford Museum, she had successful solo exhibits with the work of Cletus Johnson, Reuben Nakian and Nicholas Krushenick, the last two, former residents of Stamford. Her last studio space was with the Loft Artists Association, at the former Yale and Towne factory in the South End of Stamford.

== Legacy ==
There is a folder of Mayhall's papers at the Smithsonian American Art Museum. A year after Mayhall's death, the Stamford Museum's "New Art Annual '96", a show and competition, gave an award in Mayhall's honor. The piece that won the award was by painter Joan Wheeler and was titled, "I Always Wanted to Be a Redhead".

== Publications (selected list) ==
Catalogues

- Highlights of the 1965–66 art season. Exhibition: July 10 thru September 11, 1966. Larry Aldrich Museum, Ridgefield Connecticut
- The Minimal Tradition. Exhibition held April 29 through September 2, 1979. Aldrich Museum of Contemporary Art, Ridgefield, Connecticut
- American Art: American Women 1965 through 1985. Exhibition dates: December 15, 1984 – February 23, 1985. Stamford Museum and Nature Center, Stamford, Connecticut
- Beverly Fishman: Paintings, Drawings and Sculpture. Exhibition dates: November 4 – December 6, 1985. Housatonic Museum of Art
- American artists at the turn-of-the century. (1988) Stamford Museum and Nature Center

== See also ==
- Jacqueline Moss
