= London Maritime Arbitrators Association =

- Abbreviation: LMAA
- Formation: 12 February 1960
- Purpose: Arbitration of maritime disputes
- Location: London, United Kingdom
- Region served: Global
- President: Jonathan Elvey
- Website: http://www.lmaa.london/

The London Maritime Arbitrators Association (LMAA) is an association of practising maritime and trade arbitrators with headquarters in London, UK.

== Past presidents ==
- Malcolm T. Browne (1960–63)
- A.S. Bunker (1963–67)
- R.A.H. Clyde (1967–70)
- J. Chesterman (1970–73)
- Clifford A.L. Clark, M.C. (1973 - 75 & 1980 - 83)
- Cedric Barclay (1975–77)
- Ralph E. Kingsley (1977–78)
- Reginald O. Bishop (1978–79)
- Albert E. Morris, M.B.E. (1979–80)
- The Hon. Michael B. Summerskill (1983–85)
- Gerald Geddes (1985–87)
- Harold J. Miller (1987–89)
- Alec J. Kazantzis (1989–91)
- Bruce Harris (1991–93)
- Michael Ferryman (1993–95)
- Michael Baskerville (1995–97)
- Patrick O’Donovan (1997–99)
- Mark Hamsher (1999–2001)
- Christopher J.W. Moss (2001–03)
- Michael Baker-Harber (2003–06)
- Robert Gaisford (2006–08)
- John Tsatsas (2008 – 11)
- Christopher Fyans (2011–14)
- Clive Aston (2014–17)
- Ian Gaunt (2017–20)
- Bruce Harris (2020–21)

== See also ==
- London Court of International Arbitration
- International Moot Competition on Maritime Arbitration
