= The Aldrich Contemporary Art Museum =

Coordinates: 41.2770°N 73.4968°W

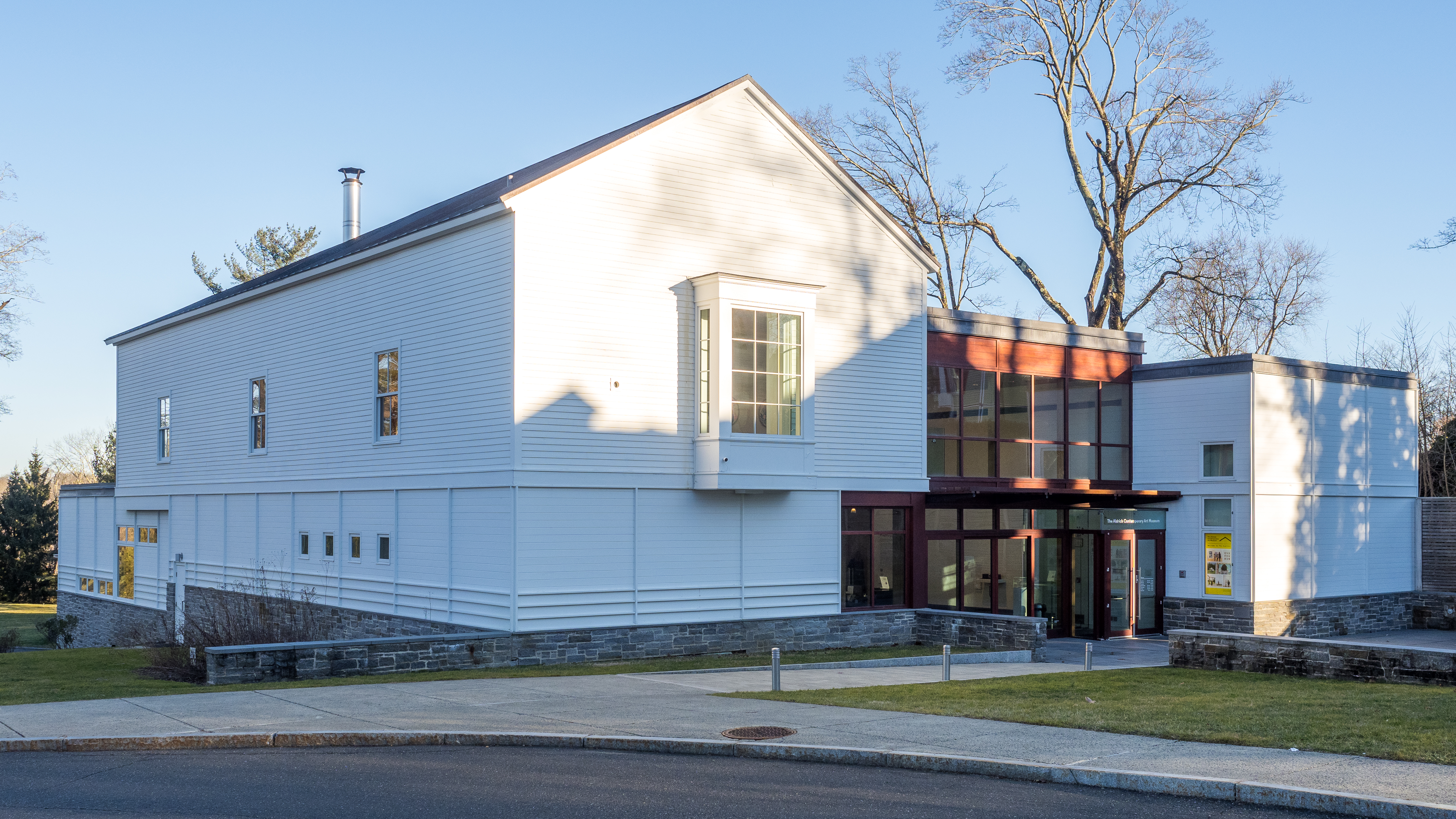
- Established: November 1964
- Location: 258 Main Street, Ridgefield, Connecticut, United States
- Type: Art museum
- Website: thealdrich.org

The Aldrich Contemporary Art Museum is located in Ridgefield, Connecticut. The Aldrich has no permanent collection and is the only museum in Connecticut that is dedicated solely to the exhibition of contemporary art. The museum presents the first solo museum exhibitions by emerging artists, significant exhibitions of established and mid-career artists whose work is under recognized, thematic group exhibitions exploring topics in contemporary art and society, and newly commissioned work.

== History ==
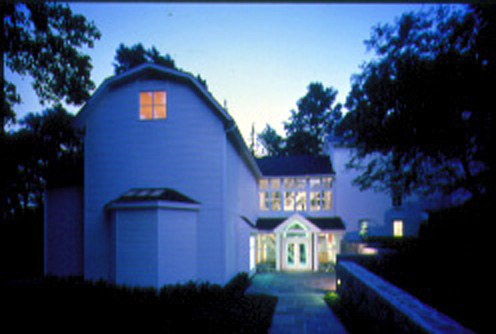
The museum building prior to its expansion

The Aldrich was founded in 1964 by Larry Aldrich (1906–2001) with the purpose of being one of the first truly contemporary art museums in the United States. Using money he raised from selling his own art collection (which included works by Picasso, Miró, Chagall, Paul Klee, and others), Mr. Aldrich bought an 18th-century former church and general store known as "Old Hundred" and converted it into the Larry Aldrich Museum.

The museum was originally located in the historic "Old Hundred" building on Main Street in Ridgefield, Connecticut, constructed in 1783 by Joshua King and James Dole, two lieutenants in the Revolutionary War. During its history the building has served as a grocery and hardware store, a residence, a church, and now houses The Aldrich's administrative offices.

The museum, whose original board of trustees included Alfred Barr, Joseph Hirshhorn, Philip Johnson, and Vera List, was renamed The Aldrich Museum of Contemporary Art in 1967. To better focus on its founding mission to exhibit only the very newest art, the museum's board voted in 1981 to deaccession the museum's permanent collection.

Mr. Aldrich stayed active and involved with the museum until his death in 2001, shortly prior to which The Aldrich's board of trustees, with their chairman emeritus in attendance, had voted to proceed with a major renovation and expansion. Groundbreaking took place in April 2003, and the galleries reopened to the public in June 2004 with a new name, The Aldrich Contemporary Art Museum. The new building was designed by architect Charles Mark Hay, design principal at Tappé Associates, Boston, and is based on an abstraction of traditional New England architecture. The facility received a design award from the American Institute of Architects (AIA).

In June 2022, Amy Smith-Steward was named the chief curator of the museum, becoming the first woman to hold this position since its founding.

In September 2023, the museum announced plans to add a secret garden, a walkway with pollinator-friendly plants, and an amphitheater, expanding space for outdoor exhibits and events by 50%. The museum also hopes to increase accessibility and improve stormwater management infrastructure. The project is slated to cost 3.25 million USD, with construction set to begin in fall 2024.

== Exhibitions ==
The Aldrich Museum features works by national and international emerging and mid-career artists. Larry Aldrich said in a 1986 interview: "Almost all the well-known American artists you can think of have been seen here at early stages of their careers. Among them Jasper Johns, Robert Rauschenberg, Frank Stella, and Cy Twombly." Additional notable names include: Darby Bannard, Lynda Benglis, Dan Christensen, Ronald Davis, Jim Dine, Eva Hesse, Ann Hamilton, Ronnie Landfield, Ray Parker, William Pettet, Robert Smithson, Thornton Willis, Jack Whitten, Isaac Witkin, Olafur Eliasson, Huma Bhabha, KAWS, Mark Dion, Shazia Sikander, Peter Young, Larry Zox and many others.

Notable past exhibitions include Material Witness, Five Decades of Art by Harmony Hammond (2019); The Domestic Plane: New Perspectives on Tabletop Art Objects (2018); A Roll in the Way by Kate Gilmore (2014); Six Story Gathering Boxes by Mary Beth Edelson (2014); Underscore by Xaviera Simmons (2013); the first solo museum exhibition of KAWS (2010); 50,000 Beds: A Project by Chris Doyle (2007); Velimir Chlebnikov by Anselm Kiefer (2006); No Reservations: Native American History and Culture in Contemporary Art (2007); Cameras by Tom Sachs (2009); Under the Westside Highway by Rackstraw Downes (2010); Navigator by Karla Knight (2021–22); and The Coyote Makes The Sunset Better by Duane Slick.

== Education ==
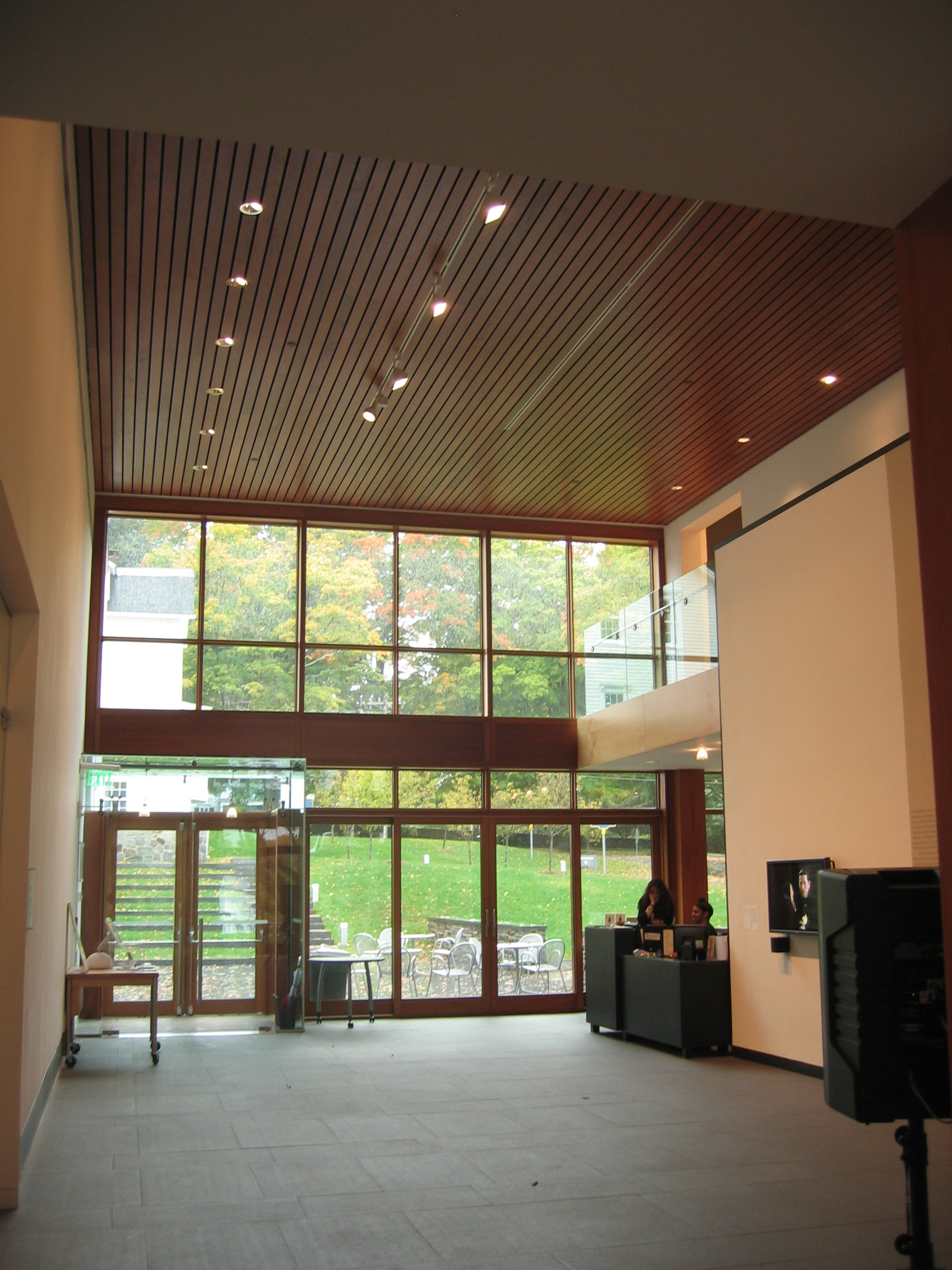
Interior view of the museum's central hall

In 1993, former director Harry Philbrick, while director of education, started The Aldrich Museum’s currently discontinued Student Docent Program. Student Docents from local schools were trained to lead their classmates through the galleries while discussing contemporary art and concepts like structure, content, form, symbolism, abstraction and metaphor. Students also got to see the installation process of the exhibitions on view and meet the artists. In an interview with The New York Times Philbrick said: "It begins to get them to think critically about the process—making the work of art and hanging an exhibition. They know there's a real live human being who makes these things, and can relate what they learn to a work of art." The program was adopted by museums across the United States.

== Directors ==
- Dorothy Mayhall
- Carlus and Ruth Dyer
- Robert Metzger
- Ellen O'Donnell Rankin
- Barry Rosenberg
- Jill Snyder
- Harry Philbrick
- Alyson Baker
- Cybele Maylone

== Notable board members ==
- Alfred H. Barr, Jr.
- Joseph Hirshhorn
- Philip Johnson
- Vera List
- Ruby Lerner
- Michael Joo
