= Morry Alter =

American television journalist

Morry Alter is a freelance video reporter, having left WCBS New York City in 2006.

Starting his career at WCBS in September 1983, he was a feature reporter who won more than 20 Emmy awards and the Quill Award. for professional achievement in the field of journalism. In 2005 Alter moved to a part-time reporting schedule and in October 2006, aged 63, he retired from WCBS.

== History ==
Alter is a two-time graduate of the University of Iowa, with a B.A. in political science and an M.A. in journalism. His broadcast career has included stops in Davenport, Chicago, San Diego, Washington, D.C., and Miami.

== Post WCBS ==
In March 2010, he joined Susan Cheng (environmental educator for Cornell Cooperative Extension) to host a PBS TV special, GoGreener, which looked at practical, low cost ways to aid the environment.
