= Alumni and staff of Art Students League of New York =

Notable instructors and lecturers

Since its inception, the Art Students League has employed notable professional artists as instructors and lecturers. Most engagements have been for a year or two, and some, like those of sculptor George Grey Barnard, were quite brief.

Others have taught for decades, notably: Frank DuMond and George Bridgman, who taught anatomy for artists and life drawing classes for some 45 years, reportedly to 70,000 students. Bridgman's successor was Robert Beverly Hale. Other longtime instructors included the painters Frank Mason (DuMond's successor, over 50 years), Kenneth Hayes Miller (40 years) from 1911 until 1951, sculptor Nathaniel Kaz (50 years), Peter Golfinopoulos (over 40 years), Knox Martin (over 45 years), Ronnie Landfield (over 30 years), Martha Bloom (over 30 years) and the sculptors William Zorach (30 years), and Jose De Creeft, Will Barnet (50 years) from the 1930s to the 1990s, and Bruce Dorfman, who is the longest continually-teaching instructor in the League's history (over 60 years).

Well-known artists who have served as instructors include:

- Sigmund Abeles
- Lawrence Alloway
- Charles Alston
- Will Barnet
- Robert Beauchamp
- Alice Beckington
- George Bellows
- Thomas Hart Benton,
- Isabel Bishop
- Arnold Blanch
- Homer Boss
- Louis Bouche
- Robert Brackman
- George Bridgman
- Alexander Stirling Calder
- Naomi Andrée Campbell
- John F. Carlson
- Robert Cenedella
- Charles Shepard Chapman
- Jean Charlot
- Edward Leigh Chase
- William Merritt Chase
- Dionisio Cimarelli
- Timothy J. Clark
- Walter Appleton Clark
- Sylvie Covey
- Kenyon Cox
- Jose De Creeft
- John Steuart Curry
- Stuart Davis
- Dorothea H. Denslow
- Edwin Dickinson
- Sidney Dickinson
- Frederick Dielman
- Harvey Dinnerstein
- Arthur Wesley Dow
- Edward Dufner
- Frank DuMond
- Frank Duveneck
- Thomas Eakins
- Daniel Chester French
- Dagmar Freuchen
- Lucia Fairchild Fuller
- Wilhelmina Weber Furlong
- Michael Goldberg
- Stephen Greene
- George Grosz
- Molly Guion
- Lena Gurr
- Philip Guston
- Robert Beverly Hale
- Hans Peter Hansen
- Lovell Birge Harrison
- Ernest Haskell
- Childe Hassam
- Robert Henri
- Eva Hesse
- Charles Hinman
- Hans Hofmann
- Harry Holtzman
- John Hultberg
- Jamal Igle
- John Christen Johansen
- Burt Johnson
- Wolf Kahn
- Morris Kantor
- Rockwell Kent
- Walt Kuhn
- Yasuo Kuniyoshi
- Gabriel Laderman
- Ronnie Landfield
- Jacob Lawrence
- Hayley Lever
- Martin Lewis
- James Little
- George Luks
- Paul Manship
- Reginald Marsh
- Fletcher Martin
- Knox Martin
- Jan Matulka
- Earl Mayan
- Mary Beth Mckenzie
- William Charles McNulty
- Edward Melcarth
- Willard Metcalf
- Leo Mielziner
- Kenneth Hayes Miller
- Fred Mitchell
- F. Luis Mora
- Robert Neffson
- Kimon Nicolaïdes
- Maxfield Parrish
- Jules Pascin
- Joseph Pennell
- Jane Peterson
- Richard Pionk
- Larry Poons
- Richard Pousette-Dart
- Vojtěch Preissig
- Abraham Rattner
- Peter Reginato
- Frank J. Reilly
- Henry Reuterdahl
- Agnes Millen Richmond
- Boardman Robinson
- Augustus Saint-Gaudens
- Kikuo Saito
- John Howard Sanden
- Nelson Shanks
- William Scharf
- Susan Louise Shatter
- Walter Shirlaw
- John Sloan
- Hughie Lee-Smith
- Isaac Soyer
- Raphael Soyer
- Theodoros Stamos
- Anita Steckel
- Harry Sternberg
- Augustus Vincent Tack
- George Tooker
- John Henry Twachtman
- Vaclav Vytlacil
- Max Weber
- J. Alden Weir
- Jerry Weiss
- William Zorach

== Notable alumni ==
The list of Art Students League of New York alumni includes:

- Pacita Abad
- Harry N. Abrams
- Herbert E. Abrams
- Edwin Tappan Adney
- Olga Albizu
- Karin von Aroldingen
- Ai Weiwei
- Gladys Aller
- Grimanesa Amorós
- William Anthony
- Edmund Archer
- Nela Arias-Misson
- David Attie
- Milton Avery
- Norio Azuma
- Elizabeth Gowdy Baker
- Thomas R. Ball
- Hugo Ballin
- Will Barnet
- Nancy Hemenway Barton
- Saul Bass
- C. C. Beall
- Romare Bearden
- Tony Bennett
- Theresa Bernstein
- Brother Thomas Bezanson
- Thomas Hart Benton
- Ilse Bischoff
- Isabel Bishop
- Jerzy Bitter
- Meredith Bixby
- Dorothy Block
- Leonard Bocour
- Harriet Bogart
- Abraham Bogdanove
- Lee Bontecou
- Henry Botkin
- Louise Bourgeois
- Harry Bowden
- Stanley Boxer
- Louise Brann
- D. Putnam Brinley
- Emma L. Brock
- James Brooks
- Carmen L. Browne
- Jennie Augusta Brownscombe
- Edith Bry
- Dennis Miller Bunker
- Jacob Burck
- Feliza Bursztyn
- Theodore Earl Butler
- Paul Cadmus
- Alexander Calder
- Chris Campbell
- John F. Carlson
- Kathrin Cawein
- Robert Cenedella
- Paul Chalfin
- Ching Ho Cheng
- Minna Citron
- Margaret Covey Chisholm
- Walter Appleton Clark
- Kate Freeman Clark
- George Henry Clements
- Henry Ives Cobb, Jr.
- Claudette Colbert
- Willie Cole
- John Connell
- Margaret Miller Cooper
- Sylvie Covey
- Russell Cowles
- Allyn Cox
- Ellis Credle
- Richard V. Culter
- Mel Cummin
- Frederick Stuart Church
- Joan Danziger
- Andrew Dasburg
- Charles C. Dawson
- Adolf Dehn
- Dorothy Dehner
- Sidney Dickinson
- Burgoyne Diller
- Yvonne Pène du Bois
- Helen Savier DuMond
- Ellen Eagle
- Marjorie Eaton
- Alice Righter Edmiston
- Sir Jacob Epstein
- Marisol Escobar
- Joe Eula
- Philip Evergood
- Peter Falk
- Frances Farrand Dodge
- Ernest Fiene
- Irving Fierstein
- Louis Finkelstein
- Ethel Fisher
- Wilhelmina Weber Furlong
- Helen Frankenthaler
- Frederick Carl Frieseke
- Wanda Gág
- Dan Gheno
- Charles Dana Gibson
- Helena de Kay Gilder
- Edward Giobbi
- William Glackens
- Joseph Glasco
- Elias Goldberg
- Michael Goldberg
- Shirley Goldfarb
- Peter Golfinopoulos
- Adolph Gottlieb
- Blanche Grambs
- John D. Graham
- Enrique Grau
- Grace Graupe-Pillard
- Nancy Graves
- Clement Greenberg
- Stephen Greene
- Red Grooms
- Chaim Gross
- Lena Gurr
- Bessie Pease Gutmann
- Channing Hare
- Minna Harkavy
- Marsden Hartley
- Julius Hatofsky
- Ethel Hays
- Gus Heinze
- Al Held
- Carmen Herrera
- Eva Hesse
- Al Hirschfeld
- Itshak Holtz
- Lorenzo Homar
- Winslow Homer
- Thomas Hoving
- Paul Jenkins
- Burt Johnson
- Donald Judd
- Joan Kahn
- Matsumi Kanemitsu
- Deborah Kass
- Alonzo Myron Kimball
- Ruth Kligman
- Torleif S. Knaphus
- Belle Kogan
- Lee Krasner
- Anne Kutka (McCosh)
- Ronnie Landfield
- Adelaide Lawson
- Arthur Lee
- Abby Leigh
- Lucy L'Engle
- Alfred Leslie
- Roy Lichtenstein
- Dorothy Loeb
- Tom Loepp
- Michael Loew
- John Marin
- Reginald Marsh
- Knox Martin
- Donald Martiny
- Mercedes Matter
- Louisa Matthiasdottir
- Peter Max
- John Alan Maxwell
- Roderick Fletcher Mead
- Hildreth Meière
- Evelyn Metzger
- Felicia Meyer
- Eleanore Mikus
- Emil Milan
- Lee Miller
- David Milne
- F. Luis Mora
- Walter Tandy Murch
- Reuben Nakian
- Louise Nevelson
- Barnett Newman
- Isamu Noguchi
- Sassona Norton
- Frank O'Connor
- Georgia O'Keeffe
- Louis Orr
- Mary Orwen
- Roselle Osk
- Tom Otterness
- Betty Waldo Parish
- Clara Weaver Parrish
- Betty Parsons
- David Partridge
- Phillip Pavia,
- Roger Tory Peterson
- Bert Geer Phillips
- I. Rice Pereira
- Jackson Pollock
- Fairfield Porter
- Edith Mitchill Prellwitz
- Henry Prellwitz
- Robert Rauschenberg
- Man Ray
- Charles M. Relyea
- Frederic Remington
- Priscilla Roberts
- Norman Rockwell
- Esther Rolick
- Louise Emerson Ronnebeck
- Herman Rose
- James Rosenquist
- Sanford Ross
- Mark Rothko
- Glen Rounds
- Luis Alvarez Roure
- Peter Rubino
- Morgan Russell
- Abbey Ryan
- Sam Savitt
- Concetta Scaravaglione
- Louis Schanker
- Mary Schepisi
- Edith Schloss
- Katherine Schmidt
- Emily Maria Scott
- Ethel Schwabacher
- Joan Semmel
- Maurice Sendak
- Ben Shahn
- Nelson Shanks
- Nat Mayer Shapiro
- Henrietta Shore
- Jessamine Shumate
- David Smith
- Tony Smith
- Vincent D. Smith
- Robert Smithson
- Louise Hammond Willis Snead
- Armstrong Sperry
- Otto Stark
- William Starkweather
- Frank Stella
- Joseph Stella
- Inga Stephens Pratt Clark
- Harry Sternberg
- Clyfford Still
- Soichi Sunami
- Katharine Lamb Tait
- Minerva Teichert
- Val Telberg
- Robert Templeton
- Patty Prather Thum
- George Tooker
- Kim Tschang-yeul
- Wen-Ying Tsai
- Luce Turnier
- James Twitty
- Cy Twombly
- Jack Tworkov
- Edward Charles Volkert
- Charles Wadsworth
- Ruby Walworth
- Adele Watson
- Emmett Watson
- Nan Watson
- Alonzo C. Webb
- Sybilla Mittell Weber
- Davyd Whaley
- Gertrude Vanderbilt Whitney
- Adolph Alexander Weinman
- J. Alden Weir
- Jerry Weiss
- Stow Wengenroth
- Pennerton West
- Urquhart Wilcox
- Anita Willets-Burnham
- Ellen Axson Wilson
- Gahan Wilson
- Louise Waterman Wise
- Sarah A. Worden
- Alice Morgan Wright
- Russel Wright
- Koho Yamamoto
- Art Young
- Marie Zimmermann
- Philip Zuchman
- Iván Zulueta
- Enrique Fernández Morales
