= Jerry Weiss (artist) =

American painter

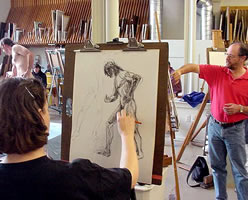
- Weiss (in red) teaching a life class at Lyme Academy College of Fine Arts
- Born: October 21, 1959 (age 66); New Jersey
- Education: Art Students League of New York, National Academy of Design
- Known for: Figurative painting

Jerry Weiss (born October 21, 1959) is an American figurative, landscape, and portrait painter and a writer. He studied classical drawing, and his career has centered on both the figure (usually from life studies), and landscape (often painted in the outdoors). He says he is "intrigued by the portrait and figure as a most sacred subject."

Weiss' paintings are held in such collections as the New Britain Museum of American Art and the Harvard Club of New York City. He is a contributing editor of The Artist's Magazine, for which he writes a "Master Class" feature with an overview of old masters. He is the son of the comic book artist Morris Weiss.

== Life and art ==
Weiss's parents met at the Art Students League of New York. His mother wanted to be a fashion artist, but dedicated herself to family while continuing to paint. Weiss said that he inherited an irreverence for life from his father, cartoonist Morris Weiss.

Weiss was born in New Jersey, but soon after the family moved to North Miami, Florida. He was influenced by the graphic freedom and assured skill of cartoonists, whose work he saw in his father's large collection. Morris asked for his son's advice when buying works by Dean Cornwell (1892–1960) and had once sat for James Montgomery Flagg (1877–1960). As a child, he had over his bed a Saturday Evening Post cover by J. C. Leyendecker (1874–1951) and later a drawing by Norman Rockwell.

Weiss was put off narrative work after seeing his father's daily hard-working routine for comics such as Mickey Finn and Joe Palooka. He sought more enjoyment and personal freedom, and decided to learn classical drawing. A museum director recommended he study with Roberto Martinez, who had been a student of the sculptor Marino Marini. From Martinez, Weiss learned to draw life-size, a practice he later taught. He studied at the Art Students League of New York, where he studied light and form. He also studied with Harvey Dinnerstein, whose "emphatic draftsmanship" he admired, at the National Academy of Design in New York City.

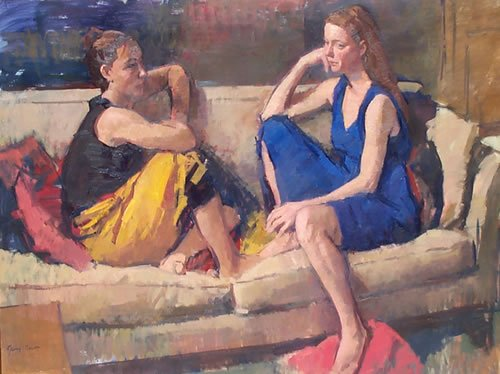
Friends, 2003, oil on canvas, 36" by 48"

Weiss began his career during the 1980s as a figurative painter. Ten years later, he took on landscapes – a genre in which he is self-taught – eventually realizing he could treat them as he did a figure in an interior, in terms of composition, pattern and shape. In 1994 he started teaching at the Lyme Academy College of Fine Arts. He held a one-man exhibition at the Boca Raton Museum of Art in 1999. The executive director of the museum wrote of his paintings: "Jerry Weiss is a product of his age ... Weiss with a great heritage goes to the past for design concepts for form, but looks to the present for his investigation of content."

Weiss said the hardest portraits to work on were impatient sitters with no interest in the art. He explained:

I enjoy spending three or four days with people who have knowledge in their field, and I would like to think it's vice versa. I find great enjoyment in these situations. Once the time is up, the portrait becomes not just a painting in a collection, but a memory of personal time shared.

He has held solo exhibitions at galleries in New York, Boston, New Jersey and Maine. His work is represented in the New Britain Museum of American Art; the University of North Carolina at Chapel Hill; Pfizer Inc.; the Harvard Club of New York City; Brigham and Women's Hospital in Boston; and Debevoise & Plimpton in New York City. He has taught workshops and lectured in Florida, New York, Washington, Maine, and Colorado. Having long taught painting and drawing at the Lyme Academy College of Fine Arts, Weiss instructs at the Art Students League of New York. He is listed in Who's Who in American Art and Who's Who in America. In 2012 he curated an exhibition of large-scale figure works that included paintings by Dinnerstein, Mary Beth McKenzie, Dan Gheno and Tom Loepp.

Weiss is represented by the Cooley Gallery, Old Lyme, Connecticut, and Portraits Inc., New York.

== Technique ==
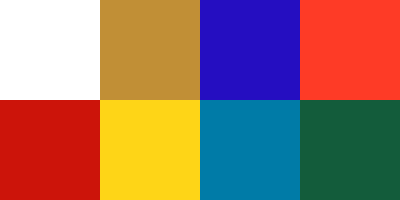
Colors used by Jerry Weiss. Top row shows his usual colors: titanium white, yellow ochre, ultramarine blue and cadmium red light. The bottom row shows occasional additions: deeper red, cadmium yellow light, cerulean and green.

Weiss uses a wood palette and a small range of colors; typically titanium white, yellow ochre, ultramarine blue and cadmium red light, sometimes with the addition of a deeper red, cadmium yellow light, cerulean and green. He occasionally paints with a knife, but mostly with flat brushes to achieve "a kind of blocky modeling". He uses Claessens oil-primed linen for portraits and panels for landscape work. After forming quick outlines, he works rapidly to block in the light and dark areas of the figure and major compositional elements with turpentine-thinned paint. Following this first stage which takes around half an hour, he reworks the areas a dozen times or more, constantly refining and unifying.

Weiss usually works to the sizes of a range of standard frames, which are mostly finished in metal or gold leaf.

== Writing ==
Weiss is a contributing editor of The Artist's Magazine, for which, in July 2008, he began a regular "Master Class" feature of art historical analyses on painting, the history of painting and various works and periods in Western art history. Among his other features have been assessments of contemporary masters, and an essay on his father.

Weiss has also written essays for fine art publications and art auction catalogues.

== Awards and honors ==
- Fellowship for Painting, New Jersey State Council on the Arts
- Best in Show, Hortt Annual, Museum of Art Fort Lauderdale, Florida
- Isaac Maynard Price, National Academy of Design, New York, 159th Annual Exhibition
- Phillip Isenburg Prize, Salmagundi Club Annual Show, New York

== Public collections ==
- Boca Raton Museum of Art
- New Britain Museum of American Art
- University of North Carolina at Chapel Hill

== Gallery ==
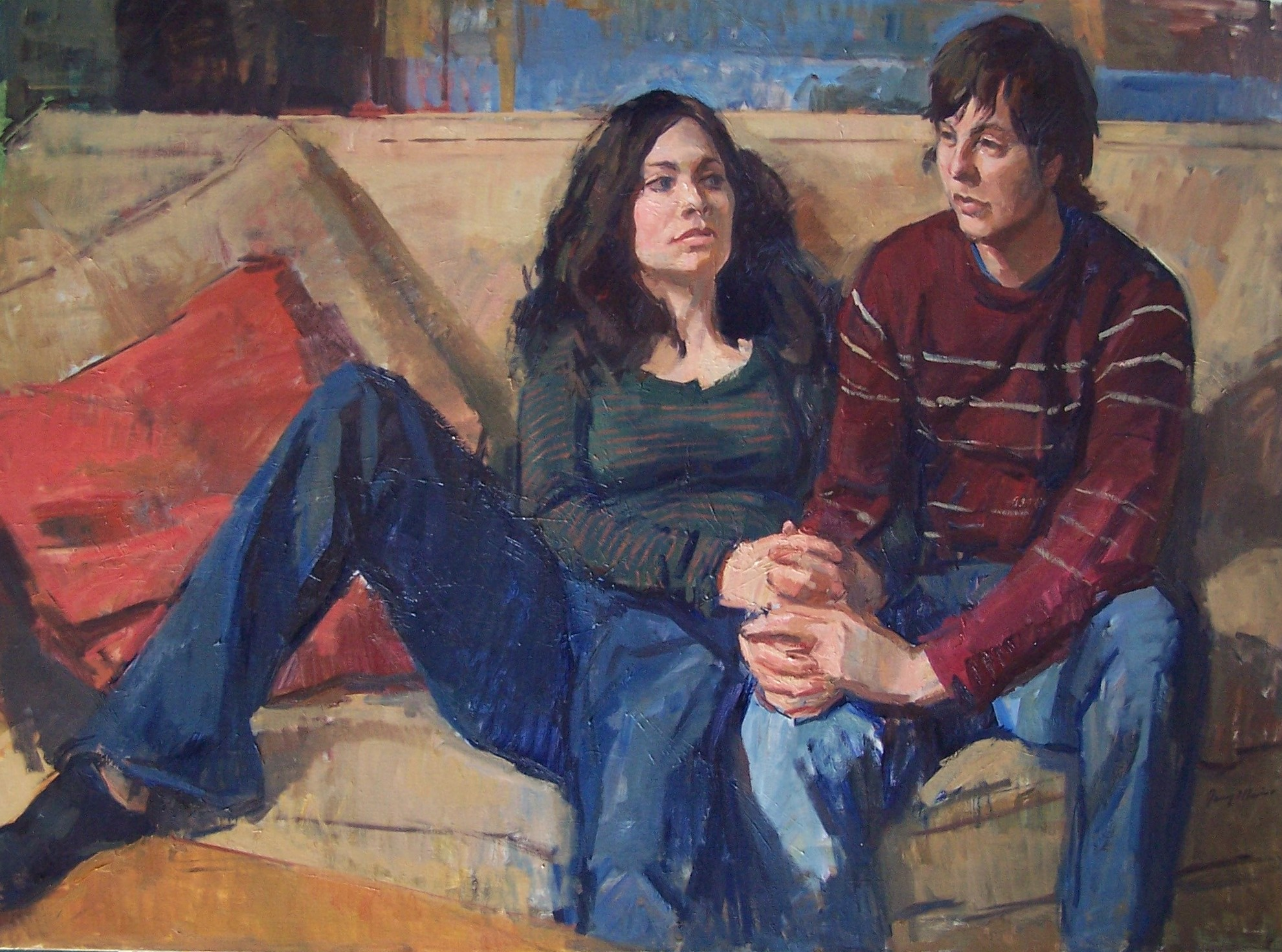
Expectation, Wendy and Adrian, 2008, oil on canvas, 36" x 48"

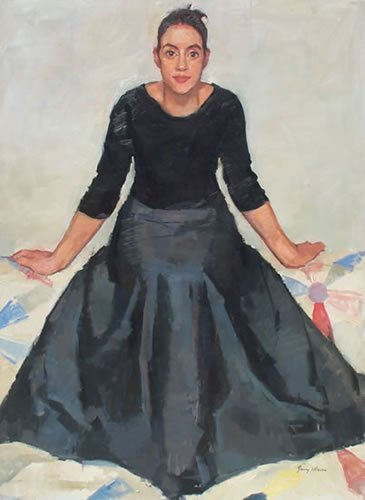
Adriane, c. 2000, oil on canvas, 48" x 36"

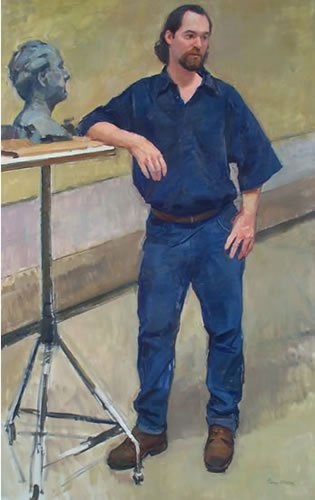
Portrait of Daniel Edwards, who is sculpting a head of Jerry Weiss; c.2000, oil on canvas, 60 x 38"

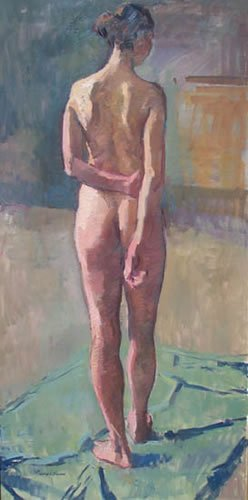
Standing Nude, 2002, oil on canvas, 48" by 24"

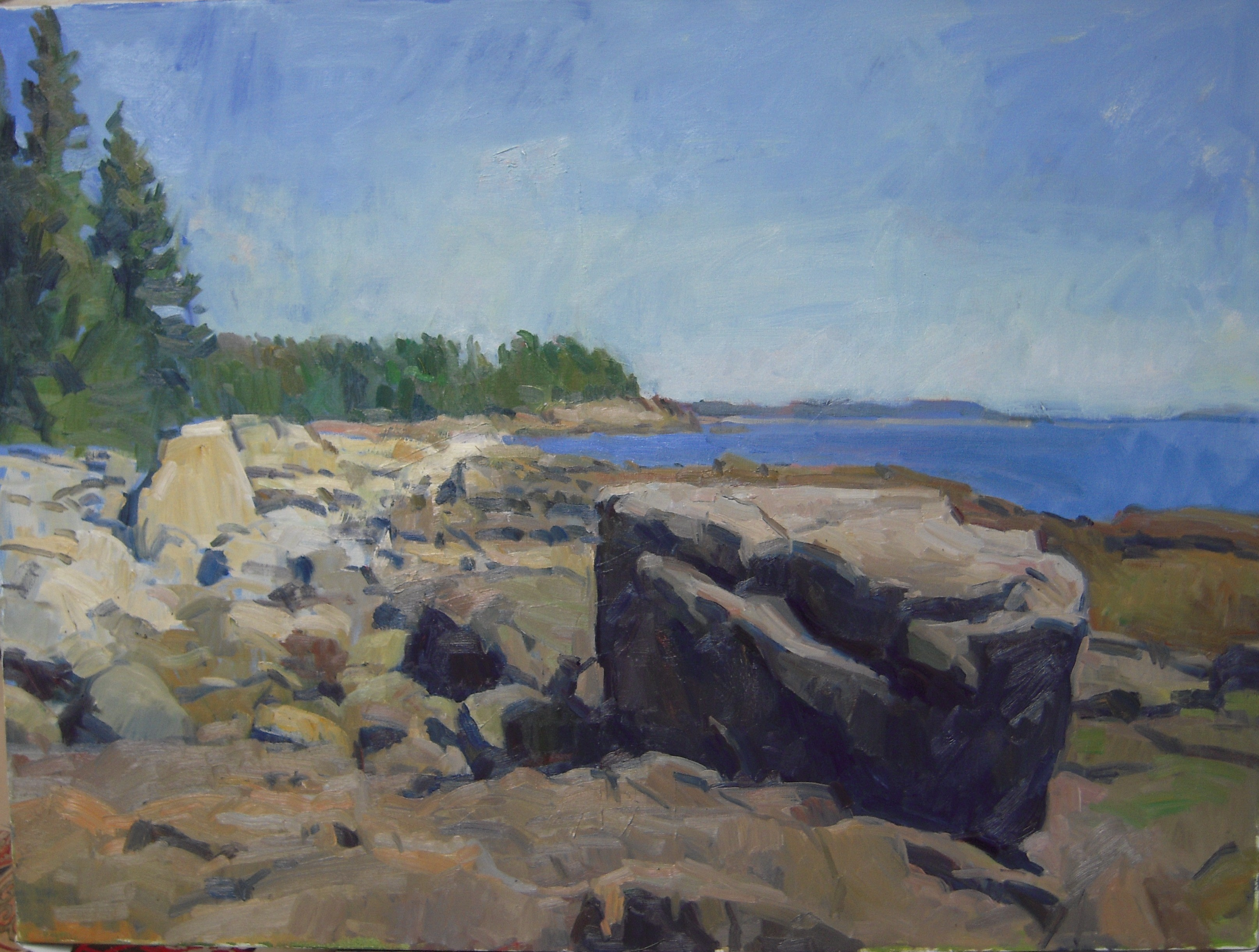
Spring, Mosquito Head, 2009, oil on canvas, 30" x 40"

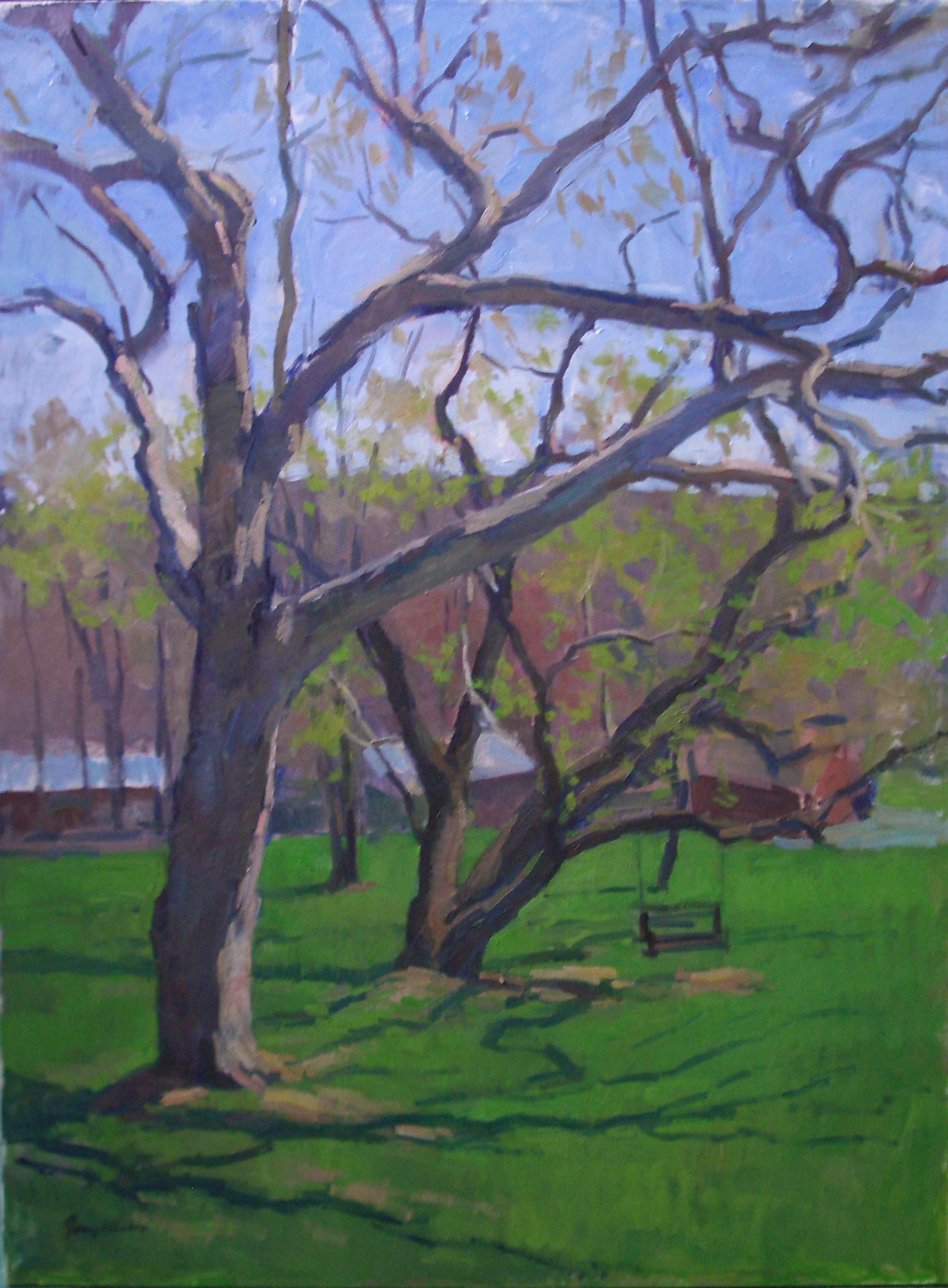
Spring Trees, 2005, oil on canvas, 48" x 36"

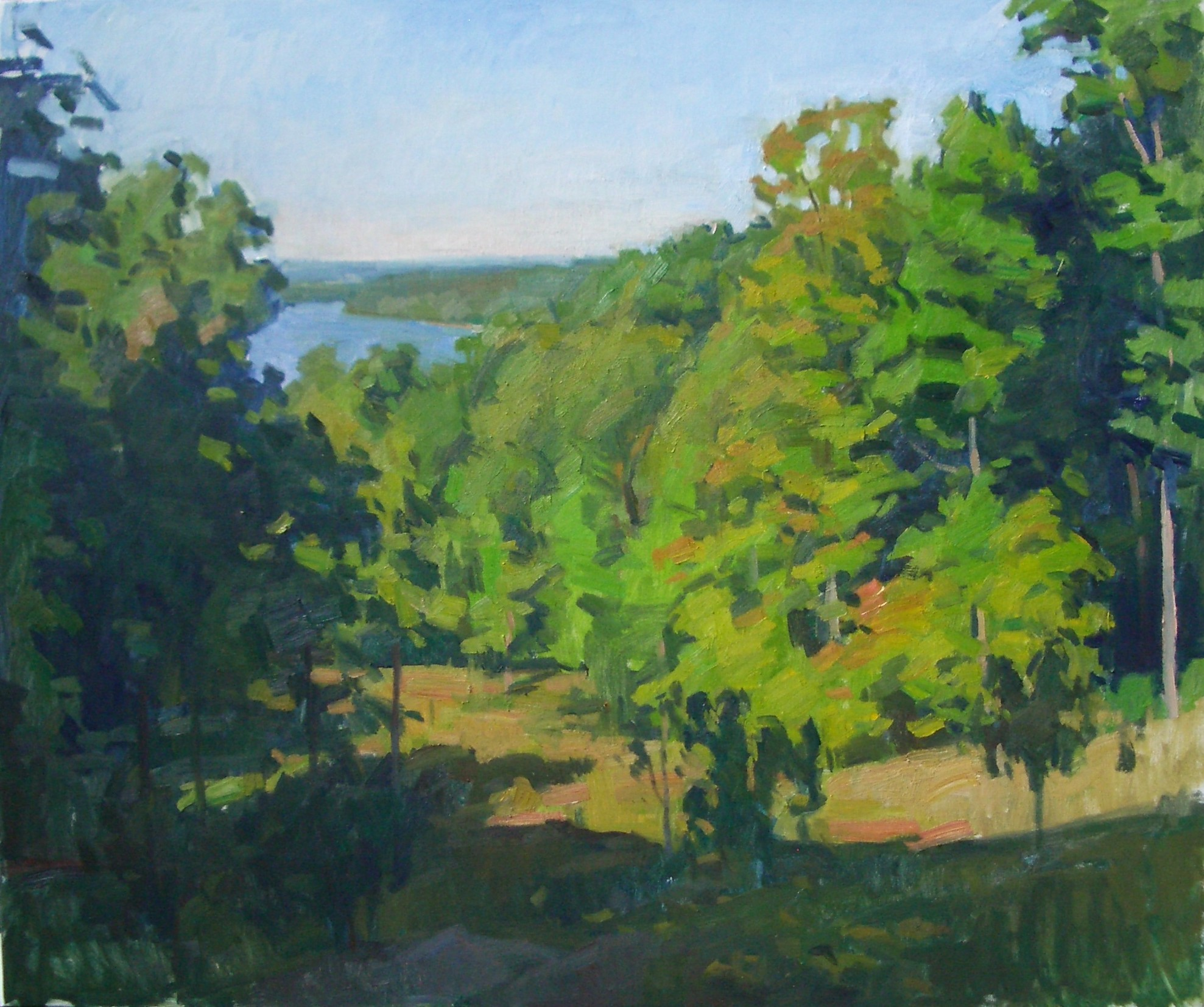
Cobalt Autumn, 2007, oil on canvas, 30" x 36"

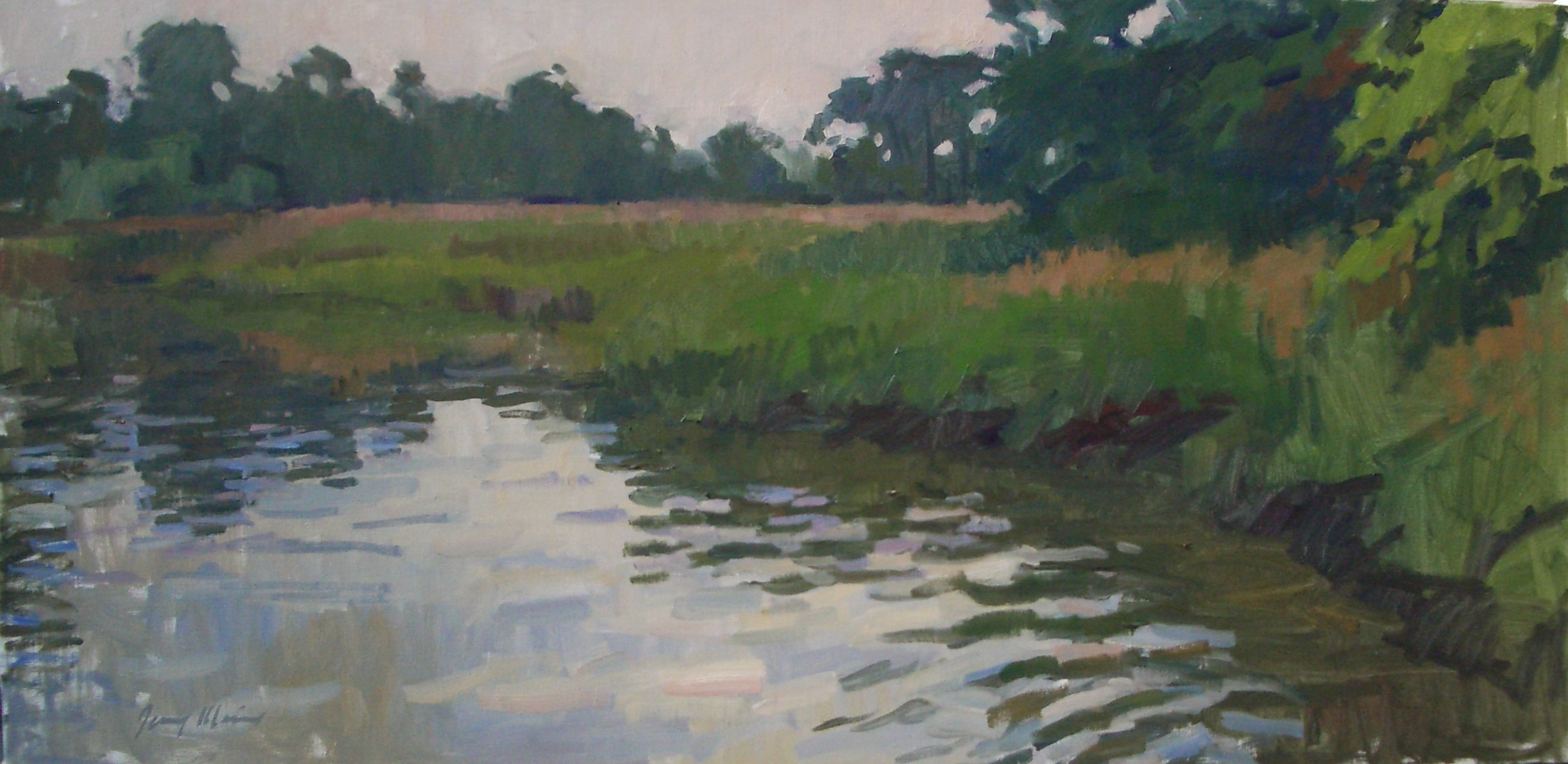
Evening, Duck River, 2004, oil on canvas, 24" x 48"
