= Loepp =

Loepp is a surname of Dutch origin. Notable people with the surname include:

- George Loepp (1901–1967), American baseball player
- Susan Loepp (born 1967), American mathematician
- Tom Loepp (born 1954), American painter
