= Jerzy Bitter =

Polish-American painter

- Born: Jerzy (Frederick) Bitter; April 4, 1941; Lviv
- Died: February 7, 2020 (aged 78); NYC
- Known for: Painting
- Movement: 20th century

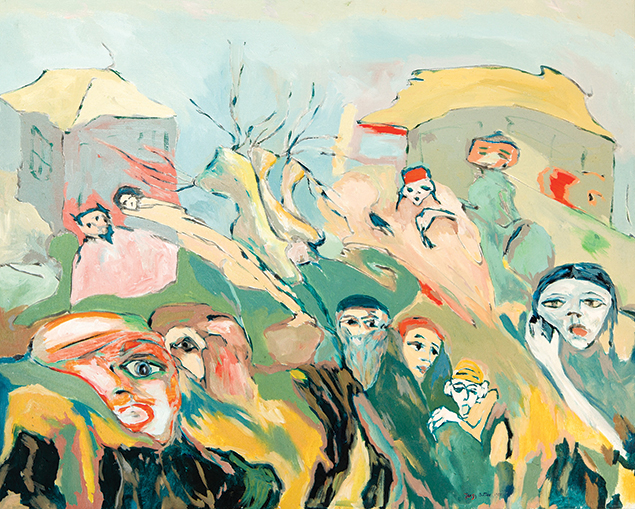
Mad Village, 1987, oil on canvas

Jerzy Bitter (also known as Jurek Bitter; April 4, 1941 – February 7, 2020) was a Polish-Jewish-American painter best known for his deeply emotional works centered on Holocaust memory, trauma, and survival. A survivor of the Warsaw Ghetto, Bitter's paintings reflect his early experiences of persecution, loss, and resilience, and are recognized for their stark expressionist style and haunting portrayals of war and genocide.

== Biography ==
Jerzy Bitter was born on April 4, 1941, in Lwów (then Poland, now Lviv, Ukraine), into a Polish-Jewish family. His mother, Cecylia Bitter (1912-2005), née Hirschfeld, was born on July 31, 1912, in Przemyśl. She had a doctorate in economics and nutrition technology. His father, Marek Bitter (c. 1903–1965), survived Majdanek concentration camp, and, in the post-war period, was an activist of the Central Committee of Polish Jews. The family was not religious and adhered to communist and socialist ideals.

On September 1, 1939, following the German invasion of Poland, the family moved to Lviv, which was occupied by the Germans in 1941. The family relocated to the Warsaw Ghetto. In 1942, Cecylia Bitter escaped with Jerzy and initially hid him with her former teacher, Maria Strasburger, and later Zofia Czerny on Warsaw's Aryan side.

After the war, the family returned to Warsaw. Jerzy later earned a master's degree in chemistry from the Warsaw University of Technology in 1965 and began doctoral studies at the Weizmann Institute of Science in Israel. However, a serious scooter accident in 1967 left him in a coma for three months and partially paralyzed. Unable to continue his scientific path, he found a passion for art, and dedicated the rest of his life toward it. In 1968, he immigrated to the United States, relearned to draw with his non-dominant hand, and went on to study at the Art Students League of New York and earn an MFA from New York University in 1975.

== Artistic career ==
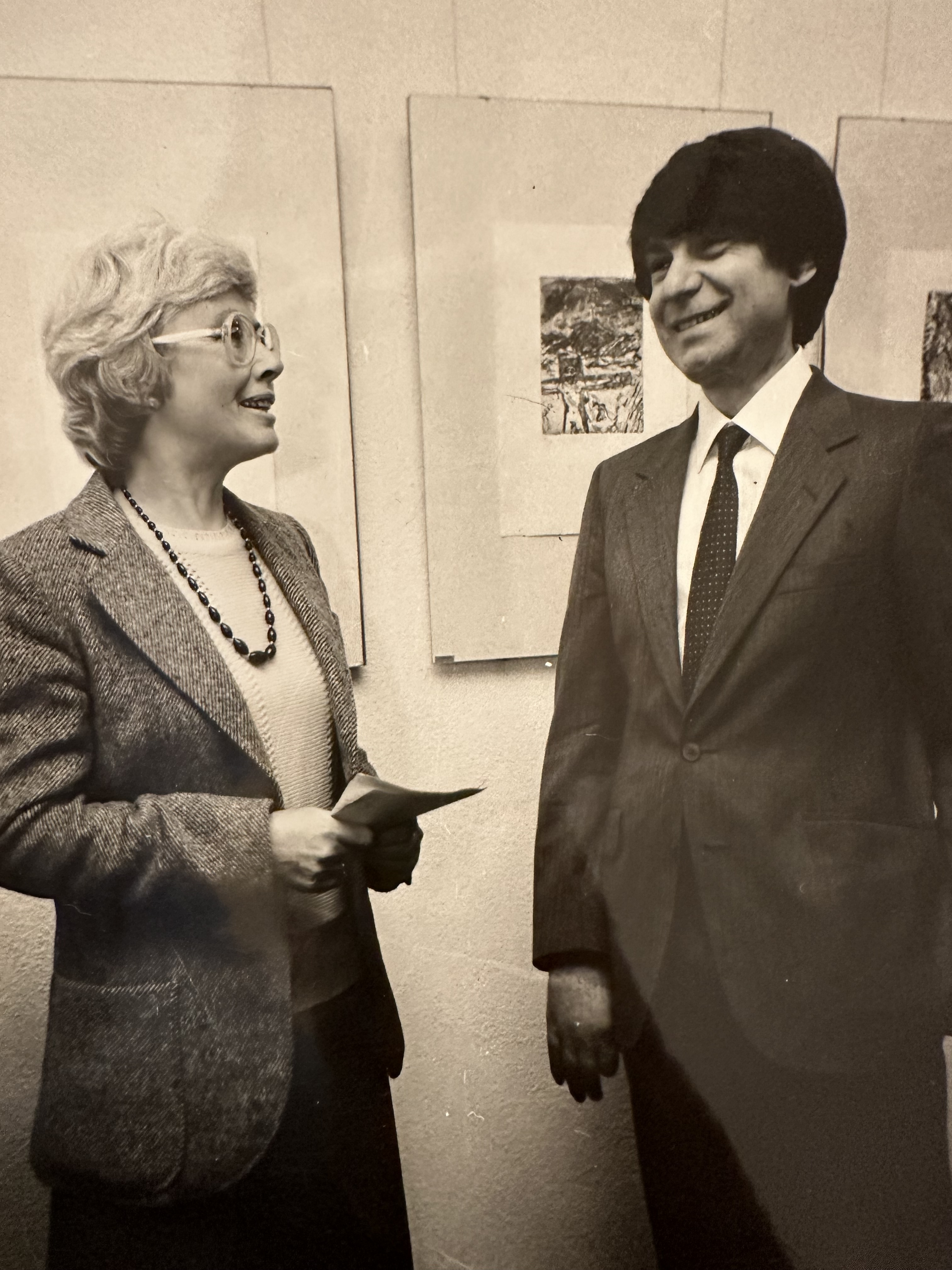

Jerzy Bitter began drawing and painting as part of rehabilitation therapy following a scooter accident in 1967 that left him partially paralyzed. After immigrating to the United States in 1968, he retrained himself to draw and paint using his non-dominant hand. He studied at the Art Students League of New York and later earned a Master of Fine Arts degree from New York University in 1975.

Bitter’s body of work comprises hundreds of paintings, watercolors, etchings, and drawings, most of which explore themes of trauma, memory, loss, and survival related to the Holocaust. His expressionistic style is characterized by stark, emotionally charged portrayals of human figures, often reflecting his own lived experience as a child survivor of the Warsaw Ghetto. His daughter appears in several works, and other pieces depict his dogs, Matilda and Pinocchio.

His paintings have been widely exhibited in both solo and group exhibitions in the United States, Europe, and Israel. Solo exhibitions of his work were held at institutions such as the Kosciuszko Foundation (New York City), the Ministry of Culture and Arts (Warsaw, Poland), the Embassy of the Republic of Poland (Washington, D.C.), the Long Beach Museum of Art (California), and the Art and Culture Center of Hollywood (Florida). A retrospective exhibition took place in 2021 at the Upstairs Gallery at Congregation Shomrei Emunah in Montclair, New Jersey.

Group exhibitions featuring Bitter’s work include the Holocaust Museum in Auschwitz, the American Institute of Polish Culture (Miami), Gallery Vienna (Chicago), the Schwab Art Festival (Chicago), and others throughout the U.S. and Europe.

His work is part of numerous permanent collections, including:

- United States Holocaust Memorial Museum, Washington, DC
- Yad Vashem, Israel
- Ghetto Fighters' House, Haifa, Israel
- Jewish Museum, New York City
- Art and Culture Center of Hollywood, Florida

== Personal life ==
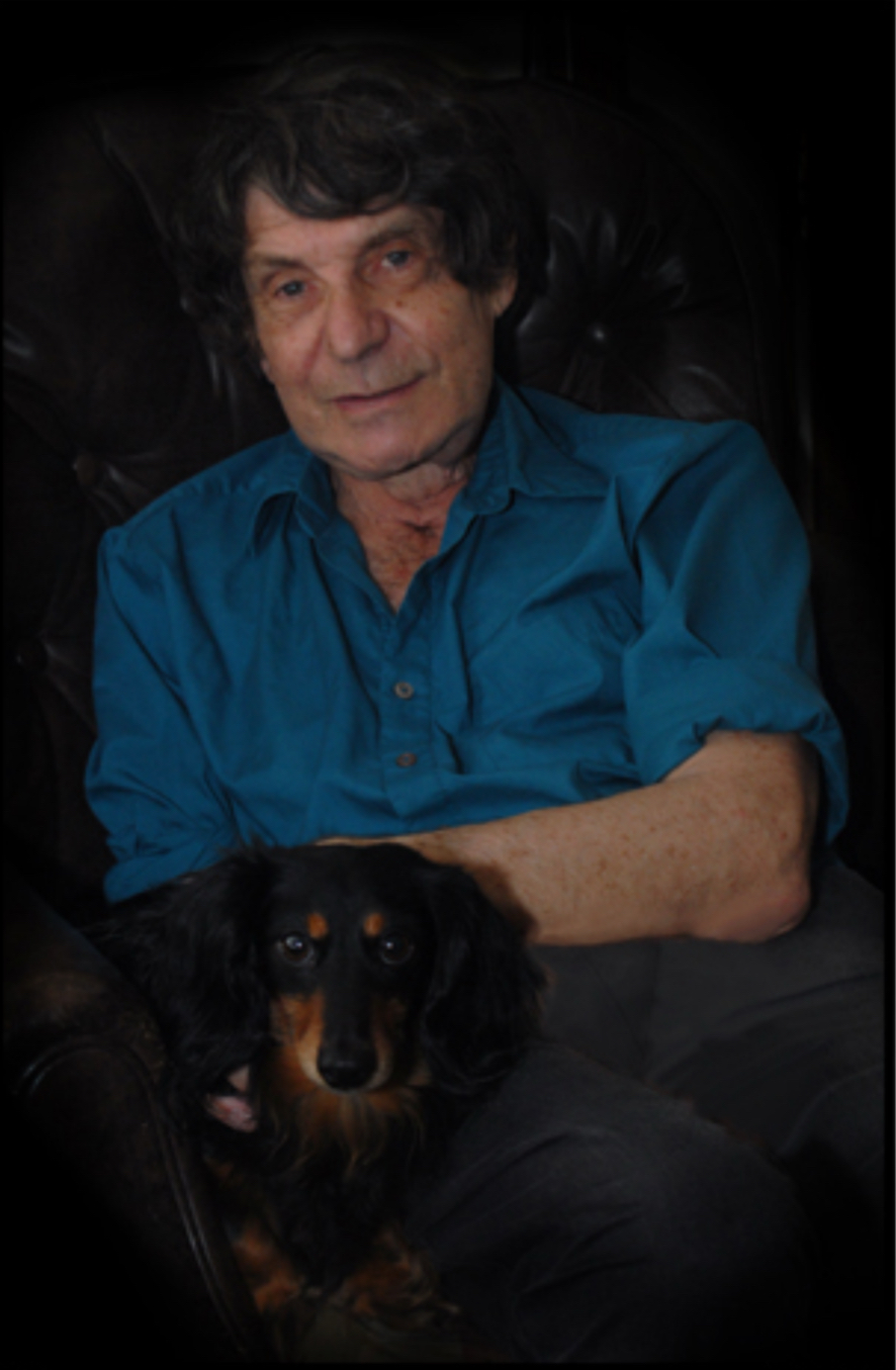
Jerzy with his dog, Pinocchio.

Jerzy Bitter married during his studies at New York University and had a daughter, Eva, in 1980. He lived and worked in New York City for the remainder of his life, maintaining a studio at the corner of 52nd Street and 10th Avenue. Throughout his later years, he continued to create new work and write memoirs reflecting on his early childhood and survival during the Holocaust.

Together with his mother, Cecylia Bitter (née Hirschfeld), he co-authored the book, Visions and Stories of a Childhood in the Holocaust (2003). His work and story have been featured in multiple publications and media, including the Shoah Foundation’s filmed interviews and the Smithsonian Institution ’s archival collections. He remained committed to Holocaust education through art until the end of his life.
