= Chris Campbell (artist) =

American painter

Strike a Pose III by Campbell, 2004

Chris Campbell (born 1952) is an American realist painter.

== Life and work ==
Campbell grew up in New Orleans, Louisiana. After graduating from Louisiana State University, she earned a Doctor of Medicine degree from Tulane University School of Medicine. She completed a radiology residency at New York University School of Medicine as well as a fellowship in nuclear medicine at Harvard Medical School. Her career changed direction when she studied at the Art Students League of New York. In 1998 she moved to Hawaii and began painting Native Hawaiian women. She emphasizes the bodily form and solidity of her substantial subjects as in Strike a Pose III.

== Collections ==
Campbell's work is held in the collections of the Hawaii State Art Museum and the Honolulu Museum of Art.

== General references ==
- Maui Arts & Cultural Center, Schaefer Portrait Challenge, 2015, Maui Arts & Cultural Center, 2015, pp. 14–15
