= Enrique Fernández Morales =

Nicaraguan writer (1918–1982)

Enrique "Quico" Fernández Morales (December 25, 1918 – November 18, 1982) was a Nicaraguan writer, playwright, and illustrator. He was also director of the National Museum and a professor of fine arts.

== Biography ==
He pursued higher education in the United States at an art school in San Francisco, California, as well as at the Art Students League of New York.

Among the themes of his poetry is the city of Granada, which the poet exalted to a level not previously seen in other local poets. He was also one of the first Nicaraguan writers to address homoeroticism in his works. His “Soneto para morir” (Sonnet to Die), written before he turned 30 and considered by writer Ernesto Cardenal as the best Nicaraguan sonnet, deals with anal penetration. The theme is also present in a collection of poems about angels that Fernández wrote, which although authors such as Julio Valle Castillo interpreted solely from a religious perspective, academics have pointed out as clearly inspired by the poet's own homoerotic desires, for example in the verses: “I nestled him in my arms, within the hollow / always warm and open, that retains / the precise measure of his limbs.”

As a playwright, he is recognized for his historical pieces La niña del río (1943), which recounts the life of the national heroine Rafaela Herrera, and El milagro de Granada (1954), about the legend of an apparition of the Virgin Mary supposedly seen on Lake Nicaragua.

His most renowned work was the dramatic monologue Judas (1970), first performed on June 17, 1978, at the Teatro Nacional Rubén Darío. The piece tells the story of Judas Iscariot and his betrayal of Jesus of Nazareth, and falls within the existentialist theater movement. Judas, like other poetic pieces by the author, contains homoerotic elements in its narrative, with Judas showing infatuation for Jesus and his betrayal being presented as an act of heartbreak caused by Jesus’ indifference. The play ends with the protagonist's suicide, thus aligning with the trend of tragic endings present in other LGBT literary works of the time.

== Legacy ==
Due to his extensive artistic career, in November 2007 he was named a favored son by the city of Granada. In 2014, the eleventh edition of the Granada International Poetry Festival was dedicated to his memory.

== Works ==
=== Theater ===
- La niña del río (1943)
- El milagro de Granada (1954)
- Judas (1970)

=== Poetry ===
- El vengador de la Concha (1962)
- Aunque es de noche (1977)
