= Louis Orr (artist) =

Louis Orr (May 19, 1876 – February 18, 1966) was an American artist who worked mainly in the field of architectural etchings.

== Early life ==
Born in Hartford, Connecticut, Orr was the son and grandson of engravers. He was educated at the Hartford Art School, where he was taught by Walter Griffin. After the death of his father in 1892, he worked as a printer in New York City, then went back to Hartford. In 1911, he won a scholarship to study at the Académie Julian in Paris under Jean-Paul Laurens and was there nearly two years. He studied briefly at the Art Students League of New York, but went back to Paris.

== Career ==
During the First World War, Orr was attached to the French Army as an official war artist. His wartime etchings of Reims Cathedral gave him international recognition, and he went on to make his name as a print maker working mainly on the buildings and bridges of Paris.

From his base in France, Orr made visits to the United States. In 1926, Yale University Press published "Ten Etchings of Yale" by Orr, and in 1929 he made sketches of Stanford University, published as a series of etchings in 1930. He was later commissioned by the Princeton University Press to make etchings of seven views at Princeton, published in 1935. In 1936, he made a series of eight etchings of the University of Virginia.

In Paris, Orr met and befriended Robert Lee Humber, of North Carolina, and agreed to undertake a series of etchings of that state. In 1940, he settled there, and by 1952 had completed a series of fifty plates of the state's historic houses and landmarks. After this, he lived in Hartford for some ten years, before returning to Paris.

Orr's work is in several major collections, including those of the Louvre, the Smithsonian Institution, the Metropolitan Museum of Art, and the Museum of Fine Arts, Boston.

== Personal life ==
In Paris, Orr met Gabrielle Chaumette, a fellow student of Laurens, and they were married on July 10, 1913. His wife died in 1961.

Orr died in 1966 at home in Paris and was buried in Nîmes with the remains of his wife.

== Honors ==
In 1919, Orr was appointed a Chevalier of the French Legion of Honour and in 1930 was promoted to Officer.
