= Louise Brann =

American painter (1906–1982)

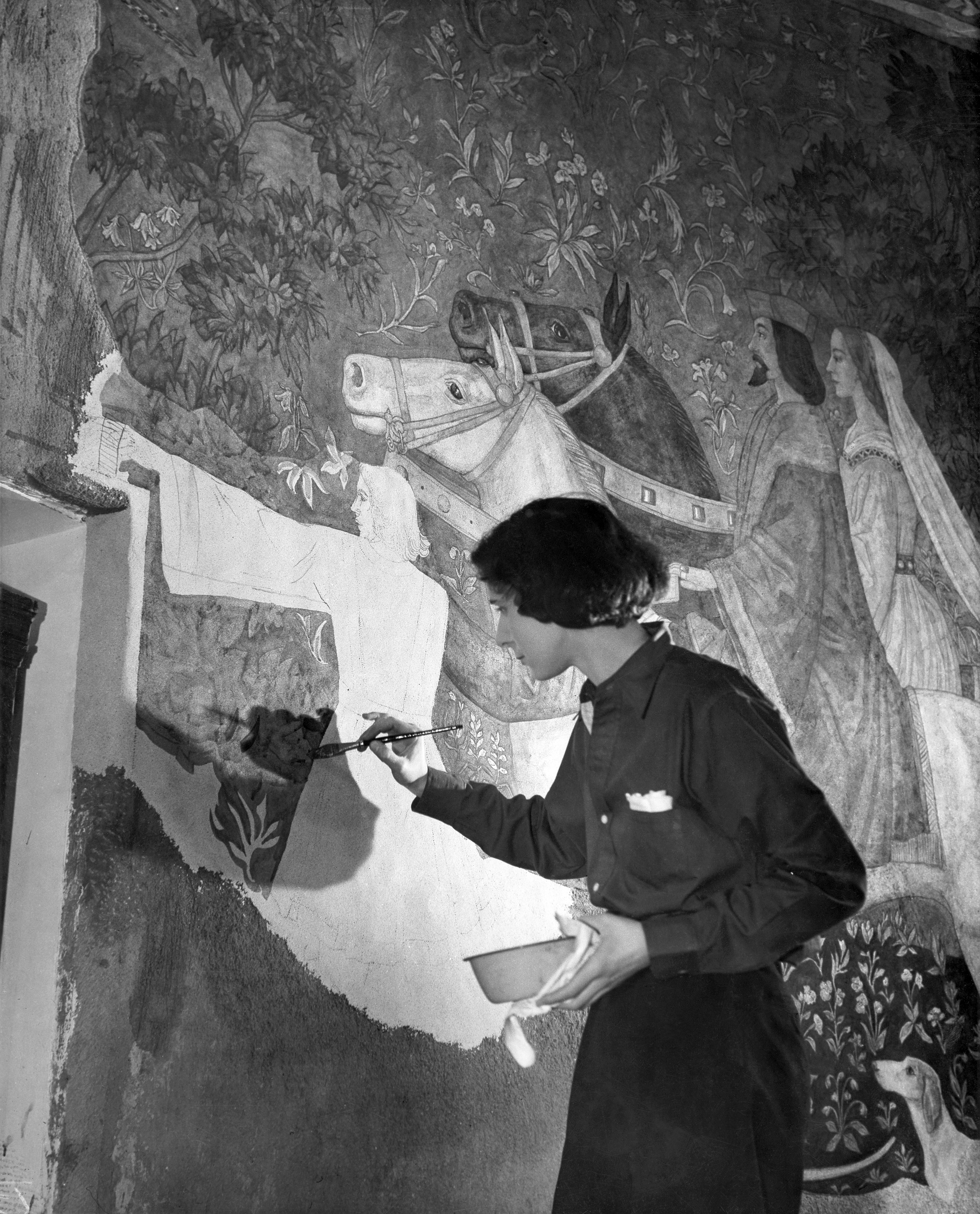
- Brann painting a fresco at the Mount Vernon Public Library for the Federal Art Project (1936)
- Born: 1906; Mt. Vernon, New York
- Died: 1982 (aged 75–76); Larchmont, New York
- Education: Art Students League of New York, Cooper Union, Fontainebleau
- Known for: Figure painter, muralist, fresco artist, illustrator

Louise Brann (1906-1982) was an American painter who worked in the Federal Art Project during the New Deal. She created large public art installations and was a prolific portrait painter in Westchester County, New York, working between 1932 and 1980.

== Biography ==
Louise Brann was born August 18, 1906, in Mount Vernon, New York, and attended Jefferson School and Davis High School. She studied art at the Art Students League in New York City and Cooper Union. At Cooper Union, she received a traveling scholarship to Europe for three years where she studied at Fontainebleau and created several frescoes in Paris and Montereau. After returning to the United States, she produced several large public art projects, most notably the fresco mural at the Mount Vernon Library in Mount Vernon, NY based on a Goebelin tapestry, The Lady and the Unicorn. The four panels were commissioned by the Federal Art Project and created between 1937 and 1938. Other works include "Vocal Music" at the Wood Auditorium in Mount Vernon; a decorative frieze in the Hotel Belvedere in New York City; and a mural at the Nichols Junior High School auditorium. In 1940, she married Wayne Amsden Soverns, a New York architect. They resided in Mount Vernon and Larchmont, New York, until her death in 1982. Her later works were painted under the name Louise Soverns.

=== The Mount Vernon Fresco ===
The Mount Vernon Public Library fresco was one of the largest ever undertaken by the Federal Art Project. It circles an entire room that is 30 feet by 34 feet. The fresco covers 1080 square feet of wall. It required 16 months to complete, with the artist completing about one square foot per day. The work was completed in time for a grand opening of a new library addition during October, 1938. The fresco is divided into four main sections, reflecting education, occupation, diversion, and recreation. The artist drew inspiration from the Lady and the Unicorn tapestries in the Cluny Museum in Paris and from other fifteenth century tapestries.

In 1966, with financial backing from the New York State Council on the Arts and others, the artist completed a restoration of the project, including replacing some damaged mortar and rejuvenating some of the paint, especially the reds.

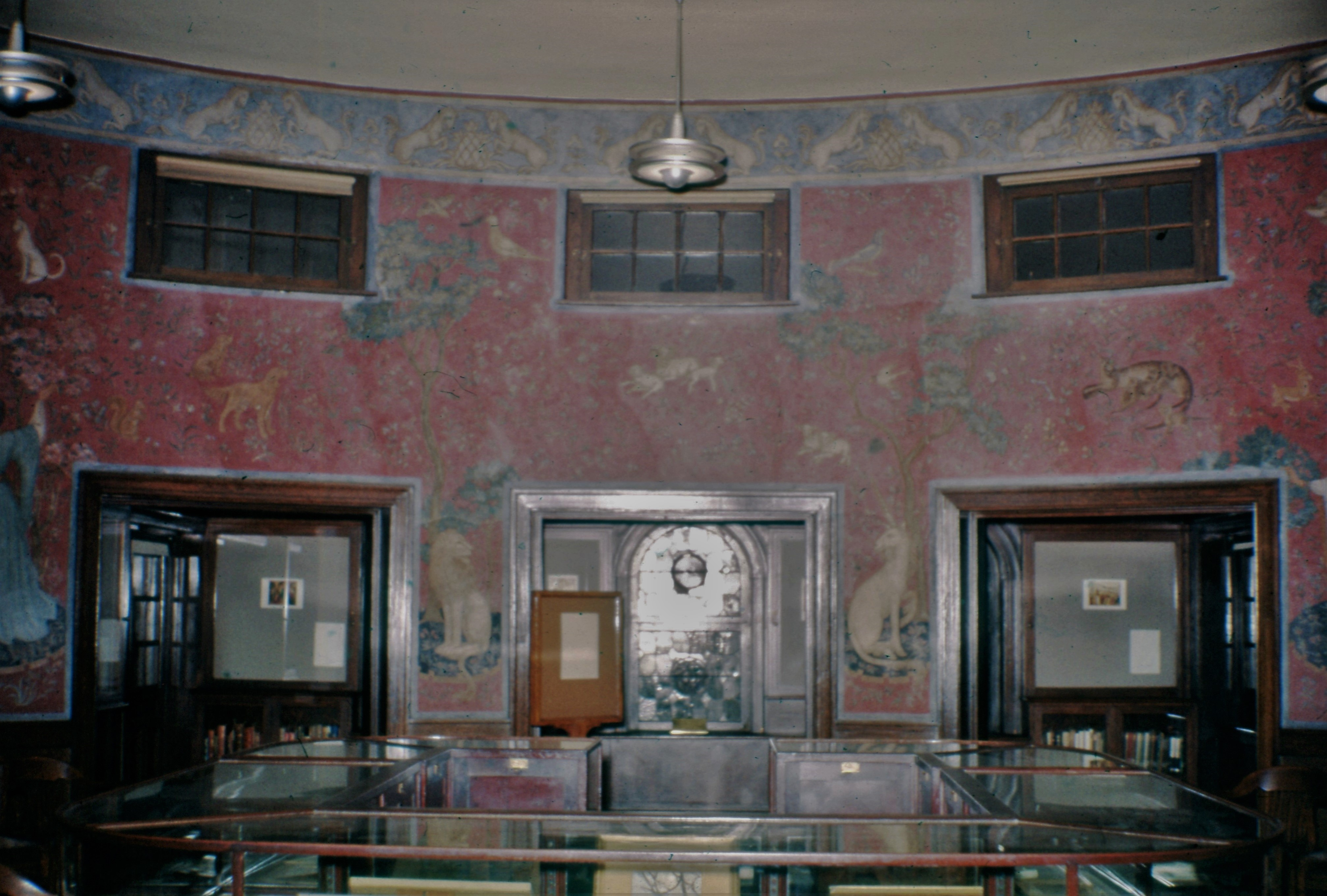
Louise Brann frescoes in the Mount Vernon Public Library, Mount Vernon, New York, completed in 1938.

=== Other Public Art Projects ===
1931 Fresco in chapel of Sacré Coeur in Montereau, France

1932-33 Frescoes in the American and Belgian Foundations of the Cite Universitaire, Paris

1934 - Four mural panels, each 14'6" x 7'8", in the auditorium of Nichols Junior High School, Mount Vernon, NY

1940 - "Vocal Music" mural, 18' high x 4' wide, honoring Theodore Von Yorx in Wood Auditorium, Mount Vernon, NY

1940 - Two murals in the Entrance Hall of Davis High School, Mount Vernon, NY

1942 - Mural painting, on wooden screen 3' high x 6' wide, for display in a United States Navy training station and winner of a competition resulting in being displayed at the Metropolitan Museum of Art in New York.

1948 - "Palmer" mural, 18' high by 4' wide, honoring Jasper T. Palmer, in Wood Auditorium, Mount Vernon, NY

=== Portraits ===
Louise Brann was a prolific portrait artist, although there is no record of her total output and almost all of her works were sold to private parties. She is known to have painted in 1935 a commissioned portrait of Dr. Karl Lorenz, the founder and conductor of the Philharmonic Symphony Society of Yonkers. After her marriage and the birth of her children, she worked from a studio in her home and painted many life size portraits of men, women, and children. This article includes photographs of two of her early portraits, now in a private collection.

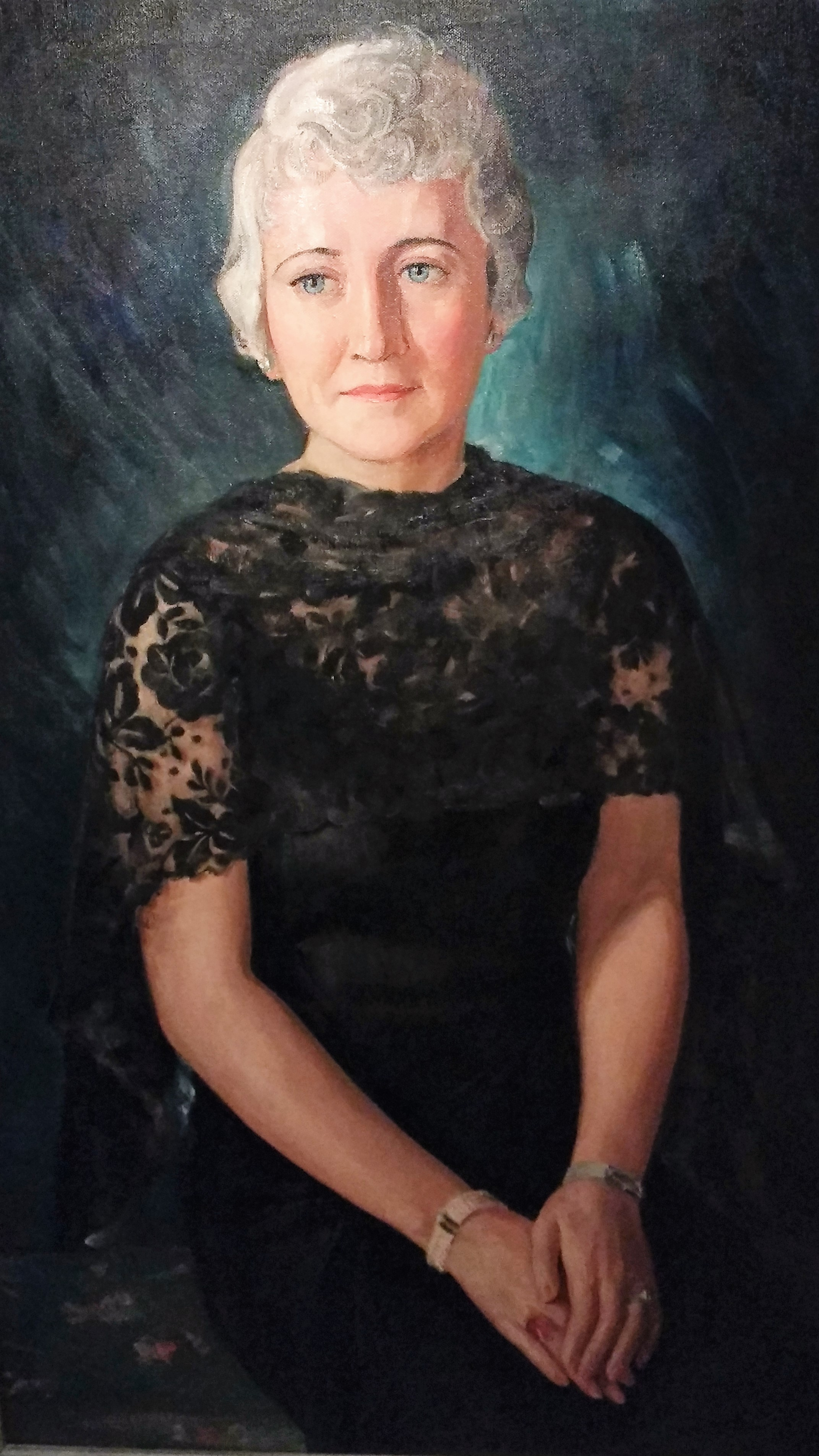
Oil Portrait of Woman in Black Lace, by Louise Brann, 1935

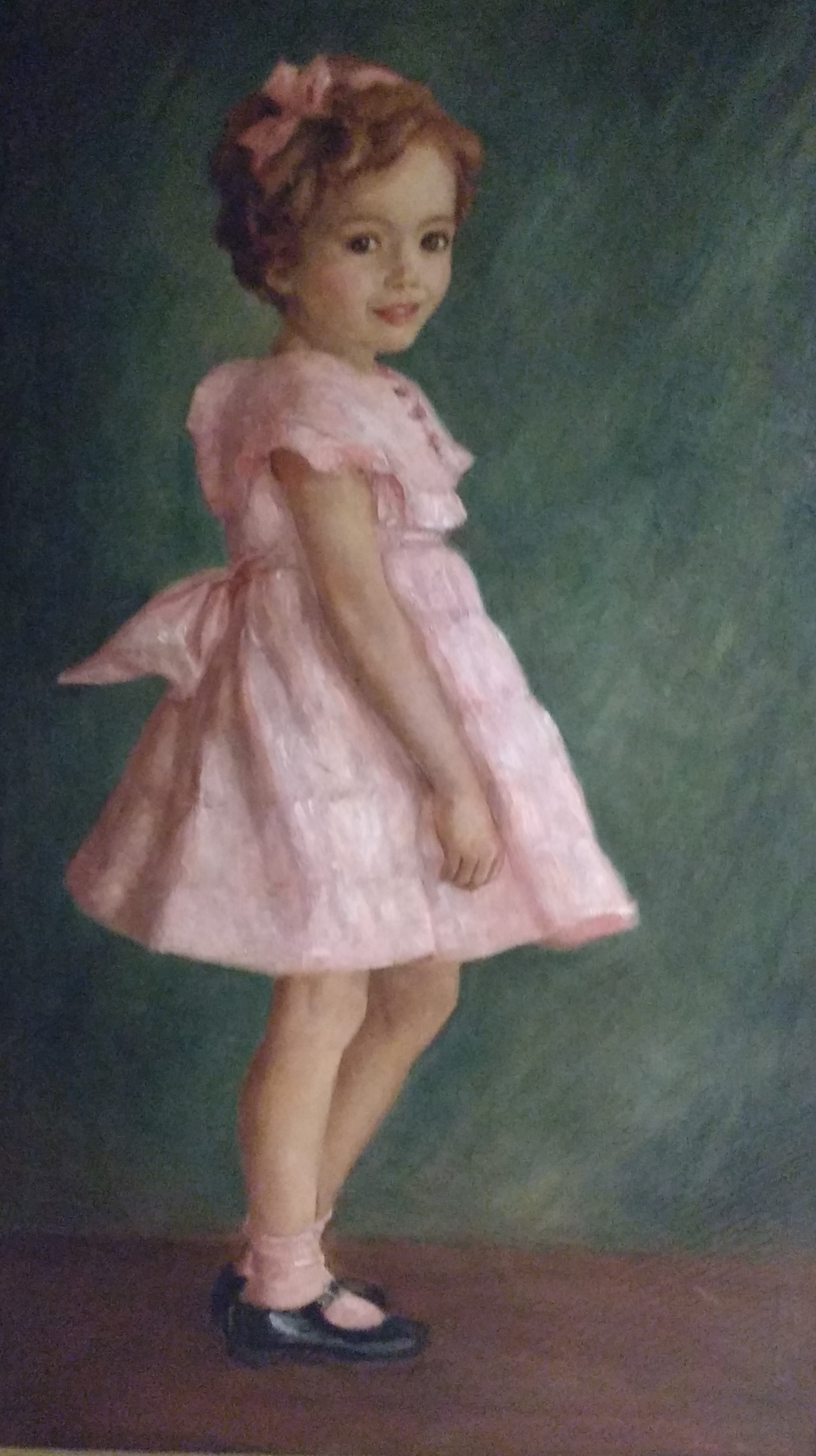
Oil Portrait of Claire, by Louise Brann, 1935.
