= Shirley Goldfarb =

American painter (1925–1980)

- Goldfarb circa 1970, Paris, France
- Born: August 4, 1925; Altoona, Pennsylvania
- Died: September 28, 1980 (aged 55); Paris
- Education: Skowhegan School of Painting and Sculpture
- Spouse: Gregory Masurovsky

Shirley Goldfarb (August 4, 1925 – September 28, 1980) was an American painter and writer.

== Biography ==
Goldfarb was born in Altoona, Pennsylvania. In 1949, she moved to New York City, where she received a scholarship to study at the Art Students League of New York from 1952-1953. She also studied in Woodstock, New York under the guidance of Nahum Tschachbasov, and at the Skowhegan School of Painting and Sculpture in Maine. In 1954, Goldfarb moved to Paris, where she spent the remainder of her life. She was the wife of artist Gregory Masurovsky. The couple were the subject of a 1974 David Hockney painting entitled Shirley Goldfarb + Gregory Masurovsky.

In 1994, a compilation of Goldfarb's journal entries were published under the title Carnets: Montparnasse 1971-1980. In 1997 the National Museum of Women in the Arts held a retrospective of her work. In 2000 the Zabriskie Gallery in New York held an exhibition of her work. In 2013 the Loretta Howard Gallery held a retrospective of her work. In 2016 her biography was included in the exhibition catalogue Women of Abstract Expressionism organized by the Denver Art Museum.

Goldfarb was noted for her technique of applying spots of paint to her canvases with a palette knife, in the style of abstract expressionism, with minimalist tendencies.

Goldfarb's work is in the collection of the Amon Carter Museum of American Art, the Minneapolis Institute of Art, the Museum of Modern Art, and the Norton Simon Museum,
