= Dan Gheno =

American painter

Dan Gheno (born February 20, 1955) is an American artist, teacher, and author living and working in New York City. Often metaphorical and autobiographical in content, his drawings and paintings use traditional figuration while also incorporating elements of a modern and expressive approach.

Gheno studied at the Santa Barbara Art Institute, the Art Students League of New York with Harvey Dinnerstein, and at the National Academy of Design School with Mary Beth McKenzie.

He has exhibited at the Butler Institute of American Art, Westmont College, the University of Hartford Art Gallery, the Museum of the City of New York, the National Academy Museum, the Arnot Art Museum, and Union County College in Cranford, New Jersey. His work is in the permanent collections of the Museum of the City of New York, the New Britain Museum of American Art, and the Florence Griswold Museum.

Gheno currently teaches at the Art Students League and at the National Academy School, where he has instructed since 1989. He holds the position of Professor Emeritus at the Lyme Academy College of Fine Arts, where he taught from 1987 to 2005. He has written frequently for a number of art magazines, and is a contributing editor for Drawing Magazine. In the 1970s he was the art critic for the Santa Barbara News and Review.
