= Sylvie Covey =

French-born American visual artist, author (born 1954)

- Born: 1954 (age 71–72); Paris, France
- Other names: Sylvie Germain Covey, Sylvie Germain–Covey
- Education: École Nationale Supérieure des Arts Décoratifs, Empire State University (BA), Hunter College (MFA)
- Occupations: Visual artist, printmaker, author, academic

Sylvie Covey (born 1954, Paris, France), also known as Sylvie Germain Covey, is a French-born American visual artist, printmaker, author, and academic. She lives in New York City.

== Life and career ==
Covey attended the École Nationale Supérieure des Arts Décoratifs. In 1977, she moved to New York City. Covey graduated with a BA degree from Empire State College (now Empire State University), and a MFA degree from Hunter College.

Covey is the author of two books, "Photoshop for Artists" (the Watson-Guptill imprint of Penguin Random House 2012) and "Modern Printmaking" (the Watson-Guptill imprint of Penguin Random House 2016). Heather Halliday in reviewing the latter volume for "Library Journal' states that ..." this book is both a technical guide and a source of inspiration".

in 2022 Covey had a solo exhibition of her work titled "Florals" at Chashama in New York City. In 2025 Covey's work was the subject of a solo exhibition at the M55 Gallery in the SoHo section of Manhattan in New York City, Stephen DiLauro in reviewing the show for the Village Star Revue called it ..."It is another brilliant explosion of colorful imagery from nature".

Her work is included in the collection of the Metropolitan Museum of Art, and the Delaware Art Museum.

Covey teaches at the Art Students League and Fashion Institute of Technology in New York City.
