= Harriet Bogart =

American painter and teacher

- Born: April 26, 1917; Charlotte, North Carolina, US
- Died: March 22, 1988 (aged 70)
- Education: Art Students League; College of William and Mary

Harriet Bogart (April 26, 1917 – March 22, 1988) was an American painter and teacher.

== Biography ==
Harriet Bogart was born in Charlotte, North Carolina, on April 26, 1917. She attended Charlotte Central High School, Richmond Professional Institute of the College of William and Mary (a diploma in Fine Arts), and studied at the Art Students League with Harry Sternberg. She taught art at St. Christophers School (Richmond, Virginia) and at Richmond Professional Institute. She was a life member of the Art Students League and was an honorable mention in the Annual National Scholarship competition of the League. Her work was represented in the North Carolina Museum of Art and in private collections. She participated in North Carolina, Virginia, and regional and national exhibitions, including one in 1946 at the Virginia Museum of Fine Arts. Her 1940 solo exhibit at the Richmond Professional Institute was composed of oil paintings on paper. Her painting "Little Girl with Chicken" was acquired by the North Carolina Museum of Art in 1948.
