= Martha Bloom =

American artist

- Education: Art Students League of New York
- Website: marthabloomart.com

Martha Bloom is an American artist.

Bloom received her artistic education at the Art Students League in New York City, and subsequently taught classes there for children.

== Museum collections ==
- Metropolitan Museum of Art, New York, NY
- National Academy, New York, NY
- Columbia Museum of Art, Columbia, SC
- McNay Art Museum, San Antonio, TX
- Delaware Art Museum, Wilmington, DE
- Library of Congress, Washington, DC
- PMW Print Collection, New York, NY

Bloom's works are in numerous private and corporate collections.
