= Henry Botkin =

American painter

- Born: Henry Albert Botkin; 1896; Boston, Massachusetts, United States
- Died: 1983 (aged 86–87)
- Education: Massachusetts College of Art, Art Students League of New York
- Known for: Painting, Collage
- Movement: American Modernism
- Patrons: George Gershwin, Ira Gershwin

Henry Botkin (1896-1983) was born in Boston, Massachusetts, and was a mid-century American Modernist who served as President of the Federation of Modern Painters and Sculptors from 1957 to 1961. He was an illustrator for The Saturday Evening Post, Harpers, and The Century Magazine. Botkin was a cousin and close friend to composers, George Gershwin and Ira Gershwin.

== Works ==
After training at the Massachusetts College of Art, Botkin moved to New York City. He took classes in drawing and illustration at the Art Students League of New York and worked as an illustrator for Harper’s, The Saturday Evening Post and Century magazines. In the late 1930s Botkin changed his approach to painting, moving from the School of Paris Modernism that he had adopted after he left Boston. Botkin was known for painting the theater, still lifes, landscapes, and low-country blacks in a romantic manner that some criticized for lacking social realism. By the late 1940s he had turned to abstraction in oils and collage. He grew an interest in collage in the early 1950s, which dominated his work until the 1960s. He served as president of four major art organizations including: The Artists Equity Association, The American Abstract Artists, Group 256 Provincetown, and The Federation of Modern Painters and Sculptors. Botkin helped to organize the first exhibition of American abstract painting at the National Museum of Modern Art, Tokyo Japan, in 1955. He also organized the sale of five hundred and forty paintings at the Whitney Museum of American Art in New York, 1959. Botkin spoke on the radio, “The Voice of America,” television, led panel discussions throughout the country, and lectured and taught privately in New York, California, and Provincetown, Massachusetts.

== Friendship with George Gershwin ==
Botkin was a cousin, close friend, and painting teacher to Gershwin. Gershwin collected many of Botkin's paintings, which people said corresponded in mood to Gershwin's music. Martha Severens wrote in her book, The Charleston Renaissance, "The interaction between the two cousins was a dynamic one, and Botkin created paintings that reflect Gershwin's music. Correspondences are found in subject and in style. Both had a genuine interest in African-American culture that preceded their visit to Folly Beach and the evolution of Porgy and Bess. . . .They talked art together and spent years of their lives together." Botkin encouraged Gershwin to paint, and after Gershwin’s death, he arranged an exhibition of his cousin's work at Avery Fisher Hall.
