= Sarah A. Worden =

American painter

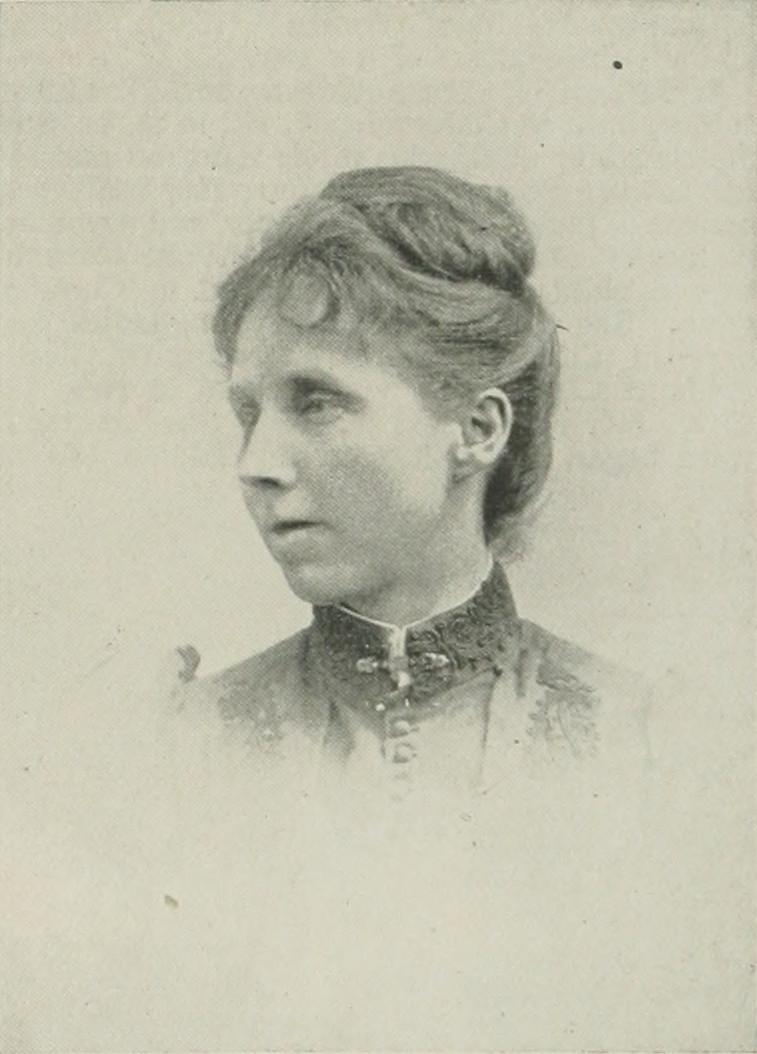
Sarah A. Worden, "A Woman of the Century"

Sarah A. Worden (after marriage, Sarah A. Worden Lloyd; October 10, 1855 – February 25, 1918) was an American painter of landscapes and portraits. She was also an art instructor in various schools and for several years, at Mount Holyoke College.

== Early life and education ==
Sarah (sometimes spelled "Sara"; nickname, "Sallie") Agnes Worden was born in Xenia, Ohio, October 10, 1853. (Note: 1853 and 1854 are also given as year of birth.)

Her parents were Isaac and Nancy Worden. Her father was a New Englander, of Puritan ancestry, and her mother was born in Kentucky, of Scotch parents. Her father was married twice. In all, she had ten siblings, including brothers, Joseph and William, and sisters, Clara and Martha.

Worden in childhood showed her artistic bent. Her parents gave her good educational advantages, but her father's death threw her upon her own resources at an early age. In New York City, she entered Cooper Institute and was soon admitted to its most advanced classes, and to those of the Art Students League of New York. She was also a pupil of Robert Swain Gifford, Douglas Volk, and William Merritt Chase She continued her studies for several years, including at Harvard Summer School; Woman's Art School; Teachers' College at Columbia University; and in Paris. While her struggles as an art student, dependent upon her own exertions, aided in developing her character, overwork and intense study impaired her health.

== Career ==
Worden was invited to become a member of the faculty of Mt. Holyoke Seminary and College, a position she held from 1883 till 1891. This made her an early member of a special group of teachers who had never studied at Mount Holyoke. Worden was also at Mount Holyoke in 1896 during the great fire, as it was Worden who rescued the portrait of Mary Lyon from the blazes. Worden served as one of the instructors in art, participated in the transformation of the seminary into a college, and was instrumental in raising the standard of the art department and establishing a systematic course of study. Her drawing classes included:

- Perspective; Drawing from Casts(Plant forms and Ornament); Principles of Design; Collateral Reading. An illustrated paper on Perspective is prepared by each student.
- Drawing from Casts and from Still Life; Study of Historical Ornament; Collateral Reading; Original Decorative Designs; Outdoor Sketching; Modeling in Clay. A paper is prepared on Decorative Art by each student.
- Drawing from the Antique; Drawing from the model in Costume; Composition in Art; Collateral Reading; Original Composition; Outdoor Sketching; Artistic Anatomy. A paper on some assigned Art Topic is prepared by each student.
- Drawing from Life; Artistic Expression; Illustration; Principles of Decorative Design; Collateral Reading; Original Illustrations and Compositions; Outdoor Sketching.
- Lectures are given on Perspective, Composition, Illustrative, Decorative and Pictorial Art, and current Art Topics. A Sketch Club meeting once a week is open to all.

She was also an instructor in various other schools.

Worden made a specialty of landscape paintings in oils. Her works included: Sunshine and Shadow, Mt. Holyoke College; Portrait of John J. Jones, Colgate University; Portrait of Miss Slade, Hamilton (N.Y.) High School; and Portrait of W. G. Morehead, Theological Seminary, Xenia, Ohio. She exhibited at the National Academy of Design (New York City); Atlanta, Georgia; and Springfield, Massachusetts. Worden also executed designs for calendars and various pictures (Taber-Prang Art Company, New York, publisher).

In 1902, Worden was studying again at Columbia University.

Worden contributed poems and prose articles to newspapers and magazines. She was deeply interested in issues of the day, artistic, social, political and religious.

== Personal life and legacy ==
On June 18, 1903, in Johnstown, New York, she married Rev. Hinton Summerfield Lloyd, of Hamilton, New York, where he was connected with the Baptist University (now Colgate University). She resided in South Hadley, Massachusetts.

Worden died in 1918. She is represented in the permanent collections of the Art Gallery at Mt. Holyoke College and other colleges.

== Awards and honors ==
- 1902, Honorable Mention, category: "Oil Painting—Portrait", Woman's Art School at Cooper Union.

== Selected works ==
- Sunshine and Shadow
- Portrait of John J. Jones
- Portrait of Miss Slade
- Portrait of W. G. Morehead
