= Susan Louise Shatter =

American landscape painter (1943–2011)

Winged Shadow, Waimea Canyon, Kauai by Susan Louise Shatter, 1986, Honolulu Museum of Art

Susan Louise Shatter (1943–2011) was an American landscape painter.

Shatter painted landscapes in both oil and watercolor, preferring the earth tones of volcanic canyons or rocky coastlines rather than the green pastoral settings more traditionally associated with the genre. Winged Shadow, Waimea Canyon, Kauai, in the collection of the Honolulu Museum of Art demonstrates her modernist approach to barren landscapes. The Art Institute of Chicago, the Buffalo Bill Historical Center (Cody, Wyoming), the Honolulu Museum of Art, the Hood Museum of Art (Hanover, New Hampshire), the Museum of Fine Arts, Boston, the National Academy Museum and School (New York City), and the Smithsonian American Art Museum are among the public collections holding works by Susan Shatter.

== Biography ==
Born in New York to Aubrey and Florence (Breines) Shatter, after studying at the Skowhegan School of Painting and Sculpture, she received a BFA from Pratt Institute (Brooklyn, New York) in 1965 and earned an MFA from Boston University in 1972. In 2005, she was elected the 32nd president of the National Academy of Design, of which she had been a member since 1995. For many years she taught watercolor painting at The National Academy of Design and The Art Students League of New York.

Shatter also served on the Skowhegan School's Board of Governors from 1978, and spent time teaching at Brooklyn College, Hunter College, SUNY Purchase, and the University of Pennsylvania. She was married to Paul Brown and they had one child, Scott Brown Shatter.

== Publications ==
- Hurwitz, Lord, "Contemporary Master: Susan Shatter" in American Artist, December, 1990
- Lee, Margaret Juhae, Into the Sea: Painter Susan Shatter Finds Her Way Back to Nature, MAMM Magazine, October/November, 1998
- Shatter, Susan, An Approach to Landscape, Boston Public Library, 1972
- Shatter, Susan, Susan Shatter: Recent Work, Southeastern Center for Contemporary Art, Winston-Salem, NC, 2001
