= Dorothy Block =

American painter

- Born: 1904; Brooklyn, New York
- Died: November 5, 1984 (aged 79–80)
- Known for: Painting
- Spouse: Robert Dublirer

Dorothy Block (1904–November 5, 1984) was an American artist known for her paintings and visual arts.

She was educated by her uncle, Louis Keila, at the Mary Baldwin College, and at the Art Students League of New York. She taught at the Art Students League and participated in the Federal Art Project, including writing a memoir about her experience as an artist in the early 20th century.

== Early life and education ==
She was born in 1904 in Brooklyn, New York to Joseph and Rebecca Block, who had both immigrated to the United States in 1888 and 1889, respectively, from Russia and together they ran an import business. They had three daughters, Ethel, Dorothy, and Lilian. Joseph Block had a financial interest and was vice president and general manager of the Franco Electric Company until 1921. (Note: In 1922, Joseph Block's address was 1001 Ocean Avenue in Brooklyn.) He had a number of patents for decorative electric devices. In 1920, the family lived in the Hotel Touraine in Brooklyn and Joseph was an executive with Electrical Corporation.

Dorothy Block, Triptych: Jazz

Dorothy Josephine and Lilian Jeanette, who would both become artists, attended Mary Baldwin College in Staunton, Virginia. Both sisters were members of the Sky High Club. (Note: Dorothy and Lilian lived at 1001 Ocean Avenue in Brooklyn, New York.) Dorothy was a member of the school's art club. Dorothy and Lilian studied art under their maternal uncle, painter and sculptor Louis Keila. Dorothy studied under William von Schlegell at the Art Students League of New York, which she attended between 1920 and 1930. Block was a friend and correspondent of Brooklyn painter and printmaker Lena Gurr, who attended the Art Students League from 1920 to 1922.

== Midlife and career ==
She worked at Art Students League of New York and as part of the Works Progress Administration Federal Art Project, including having written Reminiscences of an Artist about the Federal Art Project.

Blocked died on November 5, 1984, in her house. Her collected papers are stored in the Smithsonian Institution's Archives of American Art. The Frick Art Reference Library also has a collection of archival information about her works and career, assembled by the Museum of Modern Art.

== Personal life ==
Her sister and a student of Dorothy Blocks was artist, Lillian Block MacKendrick (1906–1987).

Block was married to Robert Dublirer. She had a daughter, Dr. Johanna C. Fisher of Huntington Beach, New York who was the step-daughter of Robert Dublirer. She was a friend of fellow artists Aristodimos Kaldis and Jacob Lawrence.

== Works ==
- Beach Scene, painting
- Isola, painting
- No title, sculpture
- Summer Interior, number 1, painting
- Terrace on Via Pontano, circa 1958, painting
- Triptych: Jazz, painting
- Vacation Scene, painting
- Vesuviana, circa 1955, painting
- View from a Window, painting
- The Wanderers in Sheridan Square, painting
