= Walter Appleton Clark =

Illustrator

Walter Appleton Clark (June 24, 1876 – December 27, 1906) was an American artist and illustrator.

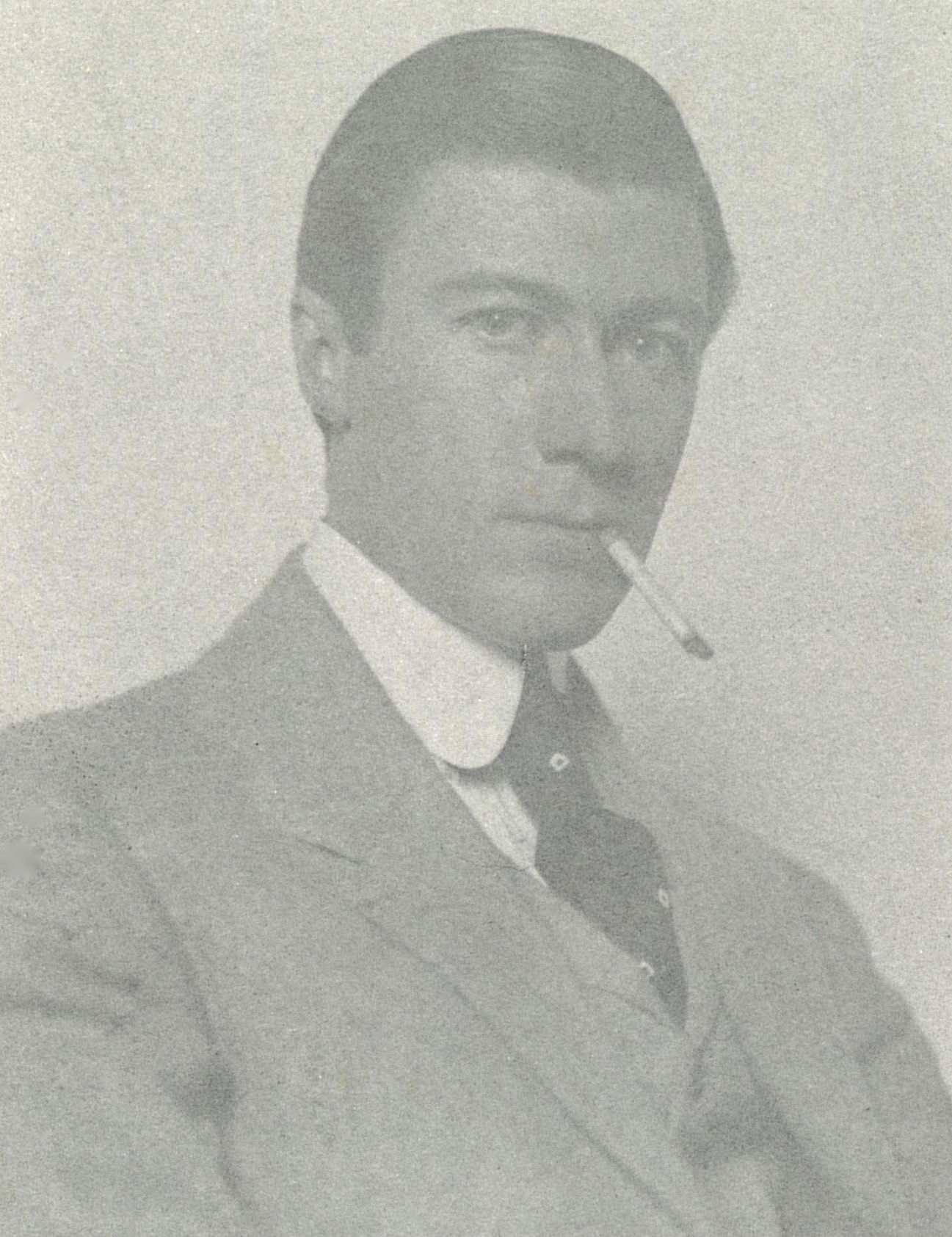
Walter Appleton Clark, c. 1905

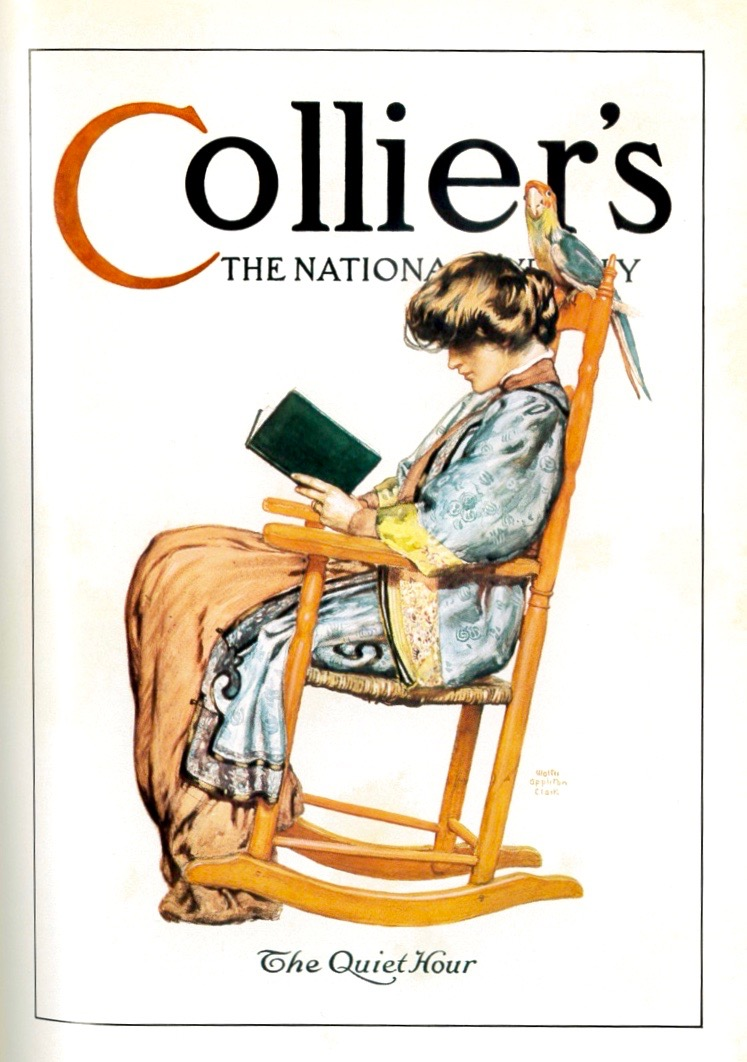
The Quiet Hour, a painting of Nancy Hoyt Clark published posthumously as the cover of Collier's Weekly, May 4, 1907

== Biography ==
Clark was born in Worcester, Massachusetts on June 24, 1876, four years before the death of his father. His mother then made a living for her family by taking in boarders. As a child, Clark drew sketches for his own amusement, and at 15, he spent a profitable summer in Jackson, New Hampshire, taking drawing lessons from a local artist. After finishing high school, Clark studied at Worcester Polytechnic Institute for two years before enlisting at the Massachusetts Nautical Training School to become an officer in the U.S. Merchant Marine. In 1894, Clark resigned as a cadet in good standing and enrolled at the Art Students League of New York, where he studied under William Merritt Chase and Harry Siddons Mowbray. Among Clark's intimate friends there were fellow students John Wolcott Adams and James Montgomery Flagg. (Note: Adams' boyhood home had been only a quarter mile from Clark's.)

Joseph H. Chapin, the art editor of Scribner's Magazine, discovered one of Clark's drawings on a classroom wall and gave him his first commission, to illustrate a story by Rudyard Kipling. (Note: Clark signed all three of his names to his drawings, a fashionable practice of the era used by a number of other artists, including Charles Dana Gibson and Howard Chandler Christy.) In 1899, after achieving rapid success illustrating books and magazine stories, Clark returned to the Art Student League as a teacher. He also taught briefly at the Pennsylvania Academy of the Fine Arts. Clark won medals at the 1900 Paris Exposition and the Pan-American Exposition of 1901. In New York, he shared a studio with the writer Guy Wetmore Carryl and illustrated two of his stories.

In 1902, Clark married Anne "Nancy" Hoyt of Greenwich, Connecticut, and the following year the couple moved to France, where they lived in Paris and Giverny. There Clark continued to contribute to American magazines and worked on a series of paintings illustrating Chaucer's Canterbury Tales, six of which were published in Percy MacKaye, Canterbury Tales (New York: Fox Duffield & Co., 1904). Clark considered the paintings "his most important work; and as a presage of what he might have done through the larger medium of oils, they undoubtedly are."

In 1905, the Clarks returned to New York where Walter regularly met with his friend, James Montgomery Flagg, the men being engaged in parallel jobs as magazine illustrators. Clark's marriage was a happy one despite his occasional melancholy, and the Clarks were highly regarded among a wide circle of friends, many who were, or would become, prominent in literature or art.

In 1906, Clark suffered for seven weeks with typhoid fever and died after surgery for appendicitis on December 27. He was only thirty, though he had already "established himself as a mature and versatile artist."

John Wolcott Adams and James Montgomery Flagg carried Clark's ashes to Woodlawn Cemetery in New York, but there is no record that the ashes were buried or scattered. A cenotaph to Clark's memory was erected in the Hoyt family plot at Christ Church cemetery, Greenwich, Connecticut.

== Sources ==
- David C. Sargent, Walter Appleton Clark (Canton, Connecticut: privately published, 1981). David Collier Sargent (1915-2007) was one of two children born to Anne "Nancy" Doell Hoyt Clark Sargent during her second marriage. Sargent was an insurance underwriter and an avid naturalist who also wrote poetry "in rhyme and iambic pentameter."
