= Eleanore Mikus =

American artist (1927–2017)

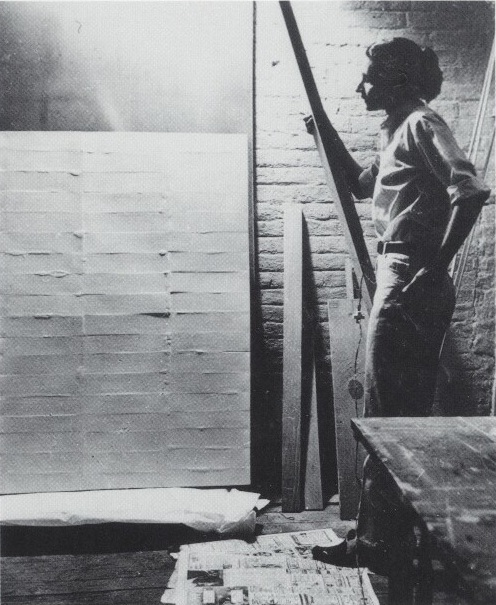
- Mikus in the 1960s
- Born: July 25, 1927
- Died: September 6, 2017 (aged 90)
- Known for: Conceptual art, Humanist
- Awards: Guggenheim Fellow

Eleanore Mikus (July 25, 1927 – September 6, 2017) was an American artist who began painting in the late 1950s in the Abstract Expressionist mode. By the early 1960s, she was creating monochromatic paintings with geometric patterns that according to Luis Camnitzer, "could be seen as conforming to the Minimalist aesthetic of the era while emphatically contradicting that style's emotional distance and coldness." In 1969, she began painting simple, cartoon-like images in bold, colorful strokes that anticipated Neo-Expressionism of the early 1980s. In the mid–1980s, Mikus resumed creating her abstract works. Since 1961, she has also been creating works of folded paper in which the "folds" make lines or textures that become integral to the material itself.

== Life ==
Mikus was born in Detroit. She was drawn to art at an early age winning an art prize in kindergarten and attending art classes at the School of Arts and Crafts in Detroit while in high school. After three years at Michigan State University, majoring in art and art history, Mikus left in 1950 to travel in Germany and Austria. She returned to the United States in 1953 and completed her undergraduate degree in art and art history at the University of Denver in 1957. In 1959, she took classes at the Art Students League and New York University and later completed an M.A. in Asian Art History at the University of Denver in 1967. Mikus lived in New York City from 1960–1972 and again from 1977–1979. She began teaching at Cooper Union in New York in 1971. From 1973–1976, she taught and lived in England. In 1979, she moved to Ithaca, New York, while still maintaining her studio in New York City. Mikus taught at Cornell University until she retired in 1994.

== Career ==
Mikus had her first solo exhibition at the Pietrantonia Gallery in New York in 1960. She showed paintings of geometric shapes on sectional canvases to allow the real lines of the joined canvases to interact with the painted shapes on the surfaces. In 1963, she exhibited at Pace Gallery in Boston. Later in New York City, she was making monochromatic works of black, white, and gray painted on uneven supports made from pieces of wood fitted together. Thickly painted and sanded many times so that the color became like a skin molded by and integral to the bumpy structure beneath, these works, called Tablets are distinguished by a play of light and shadow on the surfaces that provides an organic sense of movement. Her show at Pace Gallery also coincided with the beginning of her "paperfolds" (the term she uses for her works of folded paper). When asked to design an announcement for the show in N.Y.C., she spontaneously made seven folds on a sheet a paper, opened it up and handed it over as the flyer. From that point on, folding paper became an important part of her creative process.

In 1964, Mikus showed with Pace Gallery in New York City. Her work was gaining recognition and Dorothy Miller, well-known curator, chose a white Tablet painting (Tablet 84) for the collection of the Museum of Modern Art, New York, as a gift from Louise Nevelson. In 1966, Mikus won a Guggenheim Fellowship.

In the late 1960s, as Minimalism was gaining popularity, Mikus changed the direction of her work dramatically. According to Robert Hobbs, she was "opting for [a] new freedom," and began making cartoon-like paintings of boats, planes, trains, and dragons. Again, many saw her work as ahead of its time as she created these figurative images. The work was seen by some as drawing upon the Eastern philosophies of koans (riddles), in which she drew upon the humanist style of art. Ivan Karp from OK Harris Gallery showed her work and Mikus had four solo shows, in 1971, 72, 73, and 74. These paintings bear resemblance to Neo-Expressionist painting but pre-date them. Hobbs associates them with similar directions taken by artists Alfred Leslie and Philip Guston, around the same time.

By the early 1980s, when Neo-Expressionism was at the height of its popularity, Mikus returned to making abstract works, working on canvas and developing her paperfolds to a larger scale. In 2006–2007, she had an important exhibition at The Drawing Center, New York, NY, in which she showed 245 works dating from 1959-2006.

== Influences ==
Mikus felt a close affinity to many artists who aspire to a purified aesthetic realm, such as Ben Nicholson, Paul Klee, Albert Pinkham Ryder, Piet Mondrian and Kasimir Malevich, and the drawings of Jean Auguste Dominique Ingres. She also respected the work of Louise Nevelson, Lucia Fontana, Ad Reinhardt, and Piero Manzoni. As Mikus states: "Starting with something small, just a line, and making something big – that's what it's all about. From just a small line, a fold, you can make the rest of your life. That's what I have done."

== Awards ==
In 1966–1967, Mikus was awarded a Guggenheim Fellow in Painting.

In the Summer of 1968 she earned a Tamarind Fellowship in Lithography.

During the summer of 1969 Mikus was a McDowell Fellow in Painting.

In 1988, she was awarded the Dean's Fund of Excellence of Architecture, Art and Planning at Cornell University.

In 2004, Mikus received a Yaddow Grant in Drawing/Painting where she drew, folded, or painted 40 works of art during her two month stay.

== Collections ==
Eleanore Mikus's art is in the permanent collections of the National Gallery of Art in Washington, D.C., the Blanton Museum of Art in Austin, Texas, the Amon Carter Museum of American Art in Fort Worth, Texas, the Metropolitan Museum of Art in New York, the Museum of Modern Art of New York, and the Whitney Museum of American Art, New York.

== Current ==
Eleanore Mikus had a solo exhibition of her artwork at Levy Gorvy Gallery, New York, during 2021. Mikus's abstract prints from her Tamarind period were shown in 2020–21 at the Amon Carter Museum. Her art was featured at the Frieze New York Spotlight in May 2019. And she had a solo show in 2018 at the Marc Selwyn Fine Art Gallery in Beverly Hills, California. In 2017, she showed at the Craig F. Starr Gallery in New York City, which showcased a number of her paintings and paperfolds from the 1960s. Mikus was in a group show in 2016 at the David Zwirner Gallery. During 2011, she was invited to be in a group show titled 43 Aspects of Drawing at the Rugby Art Gallery and Museum in Warwickshire, England. In 2010, Mikus had a group show at OK Harris Gallery in New York City. She also had another group show at the Zentral Bibliotrek of Zurich, Switzerland. During 2009, the Arnot Art Museum in Elmira, New York, showed Mikus's paintings and paperfolds in a three-person show titled Three Americans. In 2008 Mikus's paperfolds were shown in a solo show at the Marlborough Gallery in New York City. Also in 2008 her work was shown in a group show titled Folded, Torn, Cut, Woven, and Pulled at the Blanton Museum of Art at the University of Texas at Austin.
