= Martin Lewis (artist) =

Australian-born American etcher

Martin Lewis (14 June 1881 – 22 February 1962) was an Australian-born American etcher.

== Early life ==
Lewis was born in Castlemaine, Victoria, Australia on 14 June 1881. He was the second of eight children and had a passion for drawing.

== Career ==
At the age of 15, he left home and traveled in New South Wales, Australia, working as a post hole digger and a merchant seaman. He returned to Sydney and settled into a Bohemian community outside Sydney. Two of his drawings were published in the radical Sydney newspaper, The Bulletin. He studied with Julian Ashton at the Art Society's School in Sydney. Ashton, a famous painter, was also one of the first Australian artists to take up printmaking.

== United States ==
In 1900, Lewis left Australia for the United States. His first job was in San Francisco, painting stage decorations for William McKinley's presidential campaign of 1900. By 1909, Lewis was living in New York, where he found work in commercial illustration. His earliest known etching is dated 1915. However, the level of skill in this piece suggests he had been working in the medium for some time previously. It was during this period that he helped Edward Hopper learn the basics of etching.

== Japan ==
In 1920, after the breakup of a romance, Lewis traveled to Japan, where for two years he drew and painted and studied Japanese art. The influence of Japanese prints is very evident in Lewis's prints after that period.

== New York ==
In 1924, he returned to etching and produced most of his well-known works between 1925 and 1935 Lewis's exhibitions in 1927–1928 were successful enough for him to give up commercial work and concentrate entirely on printmaking.

Lewis is most famous for his black and white prints, mostly of night scenes of non-tourist, real life street scenes of New York City. During the Depression, however, he was forced to leave the city for four years between 1932 and 1936 and move to Newtown, Connecticut. His work from this period includes a number of rural, night-time and winter scenes in this area and nearby Sandy Hook. When Lewis was able to return to the New York City in 1936, there was no longer a market interested in his work. He and lithographer George Miller organized a printmaking school in New York. He taught printmaking at the Art Students League of New York from 1944 until his retirement in 1952. Lewis died largely forgotten in 1962.

== Legacy ==
Lewis's print, Shadow Dance, sold for $50,400 at the Scenes of the City: Prints, Drawings & Paintings of New York 1900–2000 auction in New York in October 2010, setting a record price for the artist at auction.

The Bruce Museum in Greenwich, Connecticut, staged an exhibition of Martin Lewis prints in October 2011 drawn from the collection of Dr. Dorrance Kelly. The Bruce Museum said of Lewis:

Recognized as one of the premier American printmakers of the first half of the 20th century, Martin Lewis left an indelible mark on the landscape of the art world. Lewis was an acknowledged master of the intaglio techniques of printmaking, experimenting with multiple processes including etching, aquatint, engraving and drypoint. A highly skilled printer, Lewis created magnificent impressions that captured the energy, bustle and occasional solitude of all aspects of city life in New York. With his remove to Connecticut in 1932, Lewis instigated another topic through his printmaking: country life. This firmly entrenched Lewis as a prominent America scene artist, who captured the intersection between the urban and rural environments and shed light on the slowly emerging suburban culture.

Institutions holding Lewis' work include the Brooklyn Museum, the Smithsonian American Art Museum, The Philadelphia Museum of Art and others.
