= Urquhart Wilcox =

American artist (1874–1941)

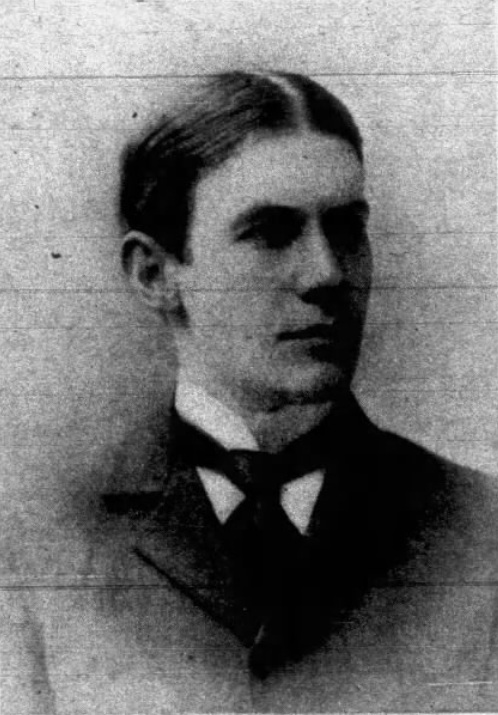
- Wilcox in 1906
- Born: David Urquhart Wilcox; October 22, 1874; New Haven, Connecticut, US
- Died: May 16, 1941 (aged 66); Buffalo, New York, US
- Resting place: Hammonasset Cemetery, Madison, Connecticut
- Education: Yale University School of Art; Art Students League of New York
- Known for: Director School of Fine Arts in Buffalo, New York
- Style: Oil, watercolor, lithography

David Urquhart Wilcox (October 22, 1874 – May 16, 1941), also known as Urquhart Wilcox (pronunciation = /ˈɜːrkərt/ UR-kərt) was an American artist, illustrator, and teacher. He was director of the School of Fine Arts in Buffalo, New York for thirty years.

== Early life and education ==
Wilcox was born in New Haven, Connecticut on October 22, 1874. He was one of the ten children of Frances Louisa (née Ansley) and Danield Hand Wilcox. He attended Hopkins Grammar School in New Haven. He graduated from Black Hall School in Black Hall, Connecticut, in 1892.

Wilcox attended the Yale University School of Art, graduating with a Bachelor of Philosophy in 1895. While at Yale, he was a member of the fraternity of Delta Psi (St. Anthony Hall). He also contributed a few illustrations for the campus yearbook.

After Yale, Wilcox studied with George Brant Bridgman at the Art Students League of New York. In 1900, Wilcox studied with Lucius Wolcott Hitchcock at the Art Students’ League of Buffalo, after winning a scholarship from the Art Students League of New York. After this, he made several trips to Europe to further his studies.

== Career ==
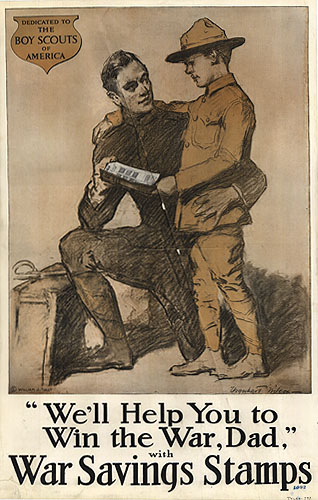
World War I post by Urquhart Wilcox

Wilcox was a draughtsman at the Cataract Construction Company in Niagara Falls, New York from 1895 to 1897. He moved to Buffalo, New York in March 1897 where he was a director for his brother Frank's newly inncorporatedHygeia Ice & Refrigerating Company of Niagara Falls. However, the company only operated for a few years.

By 1900, Wilcox was working in lithography. designing covers and illustrations for national magazines and newspapers. He provided illustrations for more than fifty magazines stories, including The Century Magazine, Everybody's Magazine, McClure's, Scribner's Monthly, and The Windsor Magazine. He also created monotypes and was an illustrator of World War I posters. In 1918, he designed a post for the Red Cross. In 1929, he illustrated two books by Jack Gordon, Elements of the Golf Swing and Ten Commandments of the Golf Stroke.

Wilcox was a painter known for oil and watercolor paintings. He also worked in pen and ink. In the early 20th century, he focused on oil landscapes and portraits. He created his first portrait in 1905 of his daughter Ethel, and went on to be "widely known as a portrait painter" whot took commissions for portraits. His works explored animal portraits, figurative works, Western themes, and African American culture. Wilcox signed his early works "David Urquhart Wilcox" or "D.U. Wilcox". Later, he stopped using the name David in his signature "Urquhart Wilcox".

Wilcox taught art at several schools and art leagues in Buffalo. He was an instructor at the Buffalo Fine Arts Academy from 1904 to 1908 and the Art Students’ League at the Albright Art Gallery from 1904 to 1907, eventually becoming the director of the Art Students' League. He took a break from teaching for two years to perfect his painting technique.

He returned to the Buffalo Fine Arts Academy, then called the School of Fine Arts, in 1910 as its acting director and as director from 1920 to 1940. He continued to teach classes while serving as the school's director. Under his leadership, the school affiliated with the University of Buffalo in 1930. He was also involved in the early development of artists Edwin Dickinson and Eugene Speicher. In November 1940, Wilcox announced his plan to resigned from the School of Fine Arts in June 1944, after running it for thirty years.

Wilcox had numerous solo exhibitions, including the Art Institute of Chicago, the Corcoran Gallery of Art, the Museum of Modern Art, the National Academy of Design, and the Pennsylvania Academy of the Fine Arts.

== Personal life ==
Wilcox married Anne Clinton in 1904. The couple had two daughters: Elizabeth and Ethel. They lived at 537 Franklin Street in Buffalo, New York. They summered in Madison, Connecticut, at the "Old Wilcox Homestead", where Wilcox had a studio.

Wilcox was a skilled golfer, winning the Buffalo Country Club's annual tournament in 1925. He designed stage and theater set for community theater groups.

Wilcox died at the age of 66 on May 16, 1941, at the Buffalo General Hospital in Buffalo, after several months of illness. He was buried in Hammonasset Cemetery in Madison, Connecticut.
