= Blanche Grambs =

American artist (1916–2010)

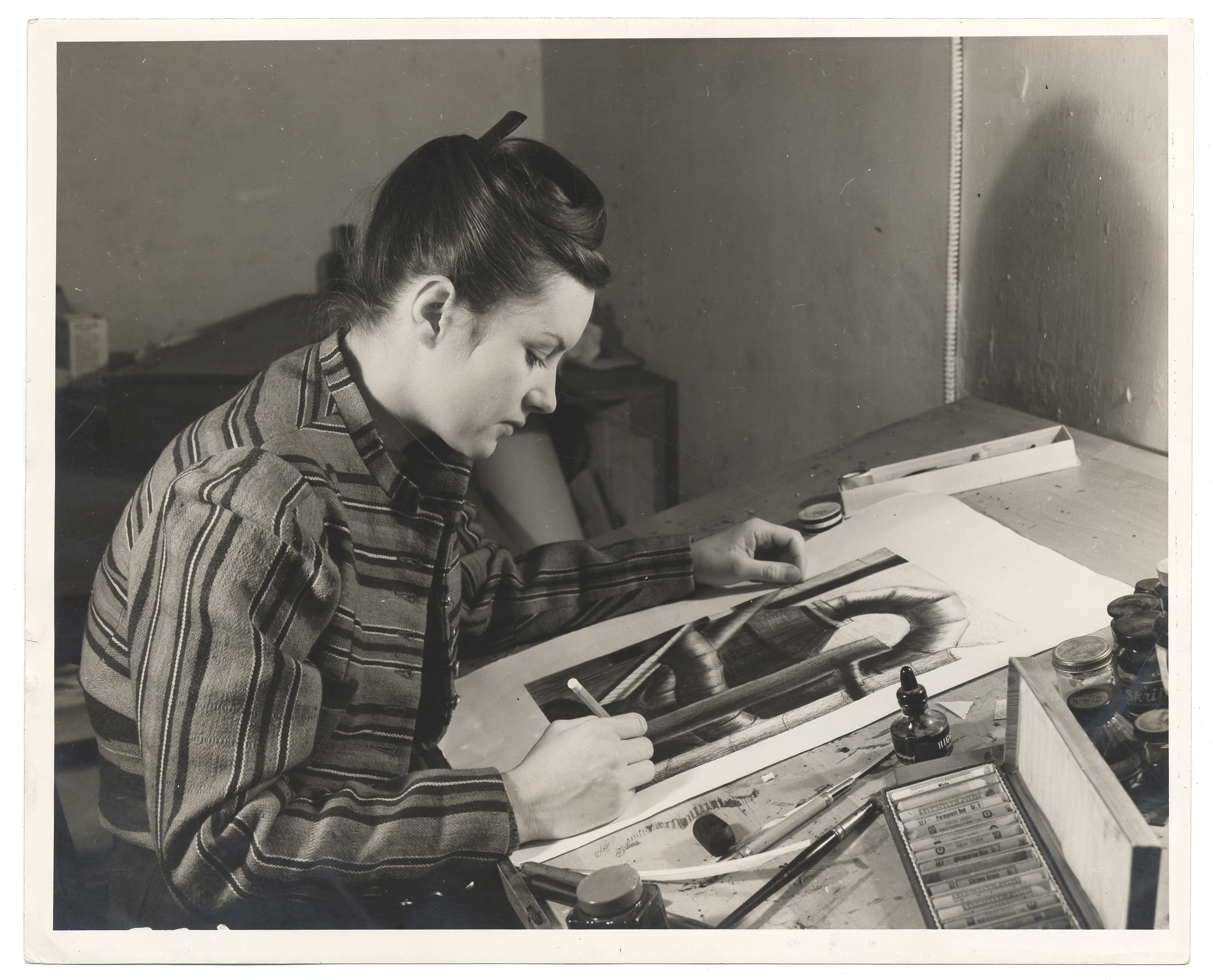
- Grambs at her drafting table working on a pastel drawing. Photographed for the Works Progress Administration. From the collection of the Archives of American Art.
- Born: Blanche Mary Grambs; 1916; Beijing, China
- Died: 2010 (aged 93–94); New York City
- Education: Art Students League
- Known for: Painting, printmaking
- Notable work: Miners; Miners Going to Work

Blanche Grambs (1916–2010) was an American artist who is known for her prints depicting the Great Depression, coal miners, the poor, and the unemployed.

== Life ==
She was born in Beijing, China. She trained at the Art Students League in New York under Harry Sternberg. She worked in the Works Progress Administration's Federal Art Project during the New Deal, beginning in 1936 and producing over 30 prints for the WPA. She created lithographs and intaglio prints.

Grambs was actively political, attending classes in Marxist theory at the New York Workers School and participating in communist rallies. She was arrested in 1936 at an organized sit-in, protesting cuts to the WPA FAP budget. Grambs was an artist in the WPA's Federal Art Project, creating prints depicting laborers and social realism themes. For her art, she traveled to Lanceford, Pennsylvania to create prints and etchings of the coal miners. Grambs' work reflected her political leanings and commitment to social reform. Grambs was politically active and aligned with social realism in both her life and work. In 1936, she was arrested during a sit-in protest against funding cuts to the WPA’s Federal Art Project. She studied Marxist theory at the New York Workers School and regularly participated in rallies advocating for artists’ rights and social reform. Grambs’ work is represented in the permanent collections of several major art institutions, including the Smithsonian American Art Museum and the British Museum. Her prints continue to be recognized for their vivid depiction of working-class life and the social conditions of the Great Depression.

She married Hugh "Lefty" Miller, and they moved to Paris together. Shortly after their arrival, war broke out, and they moved back to New York, where she continued to work as an artist. Her later work included contributing illustrations to over 30 children's books.

Grambs' work is held in the Metropolitan Museum of Art, the Philadelphia Museum of Art, the Detroit Institute of Art, the Crystal Bridges Museum of American Art, the Art Institute of Chicago, the Baltimore Museum of Art, the British Museum, the Smithsonian American Art Museum, and the University of Michigan Museum of Art.

== Gallery ==
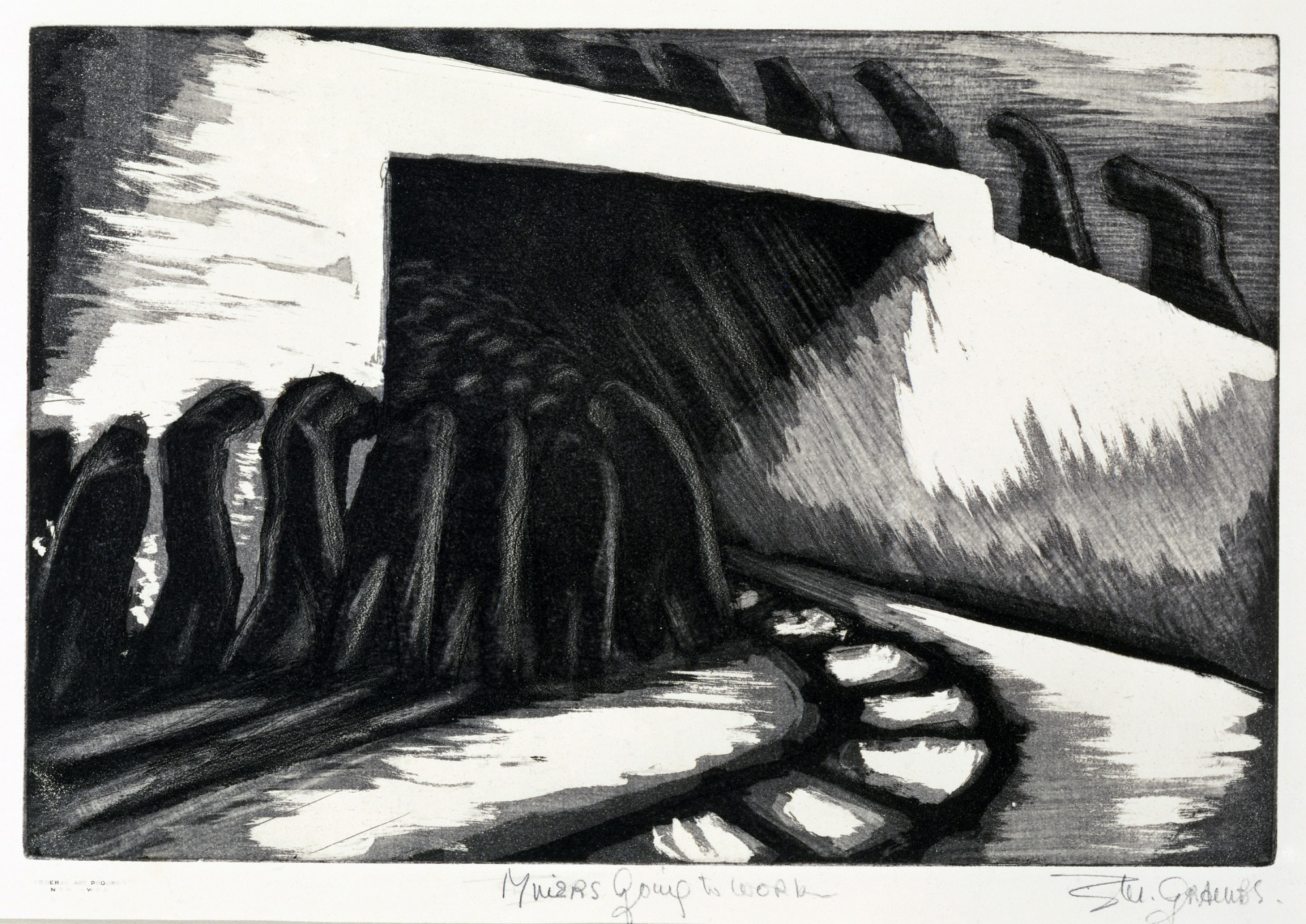
Miners Going to Work, n.d

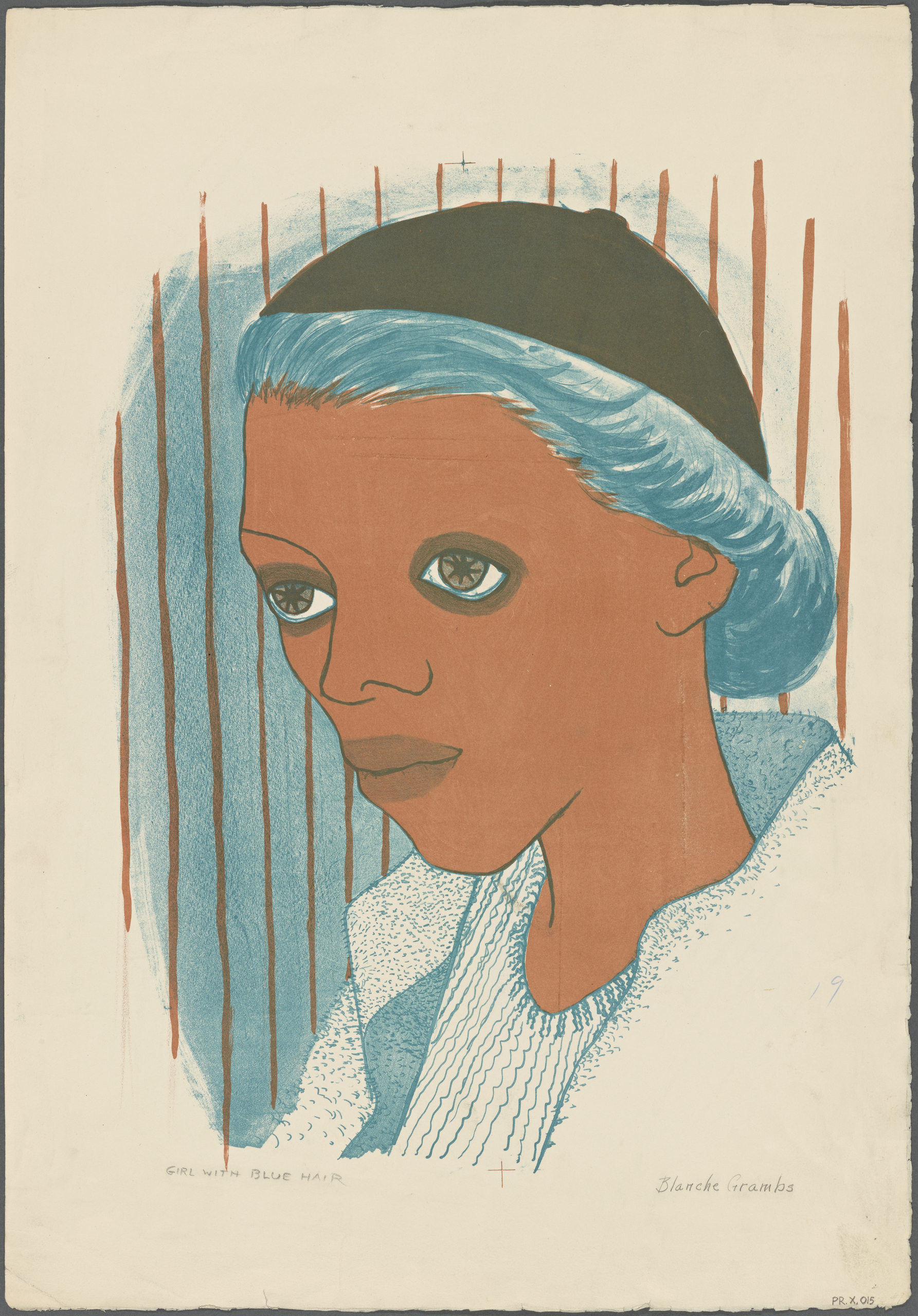
Girl With Blue Hair

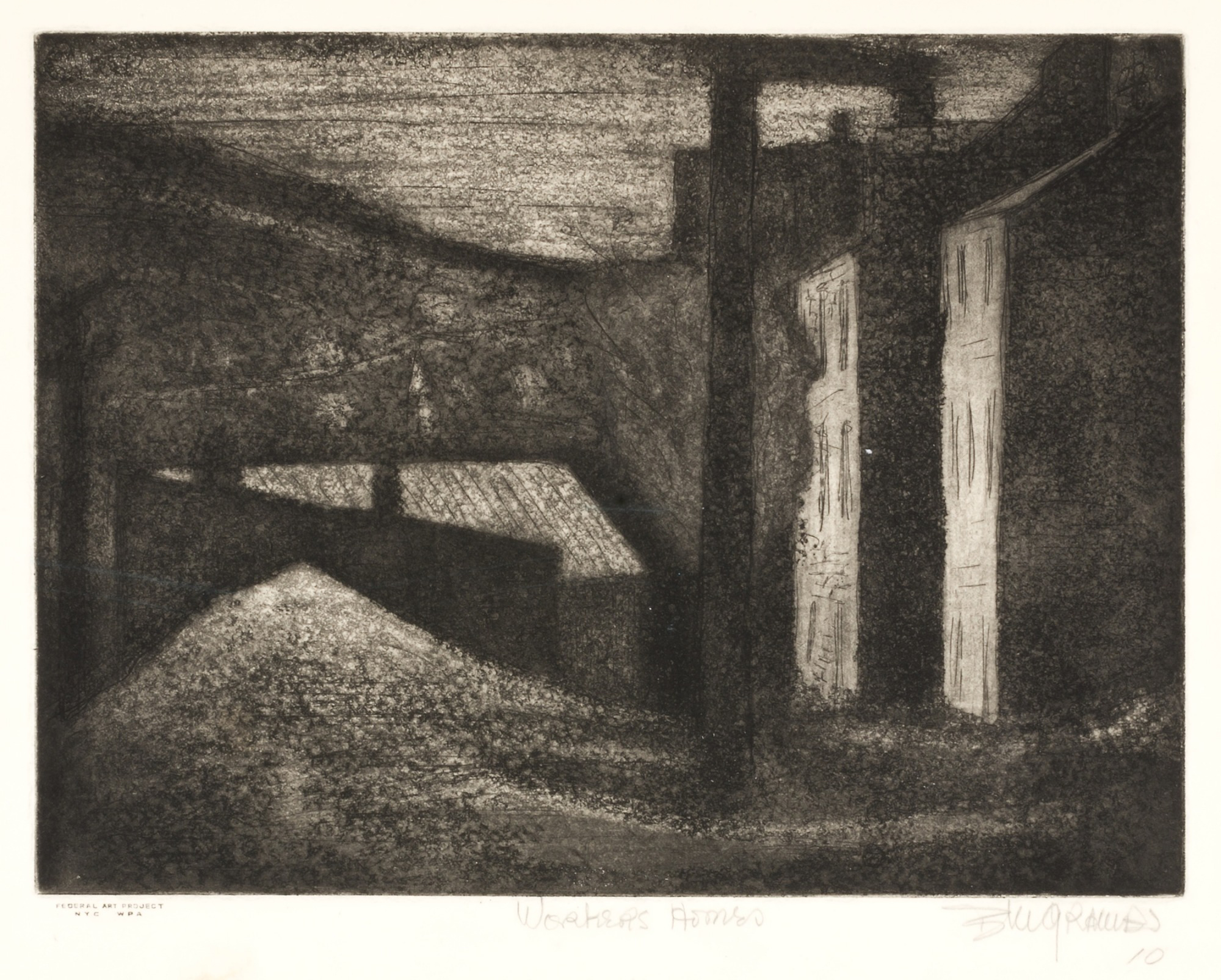
Workers Homes, ca. 1935-1940

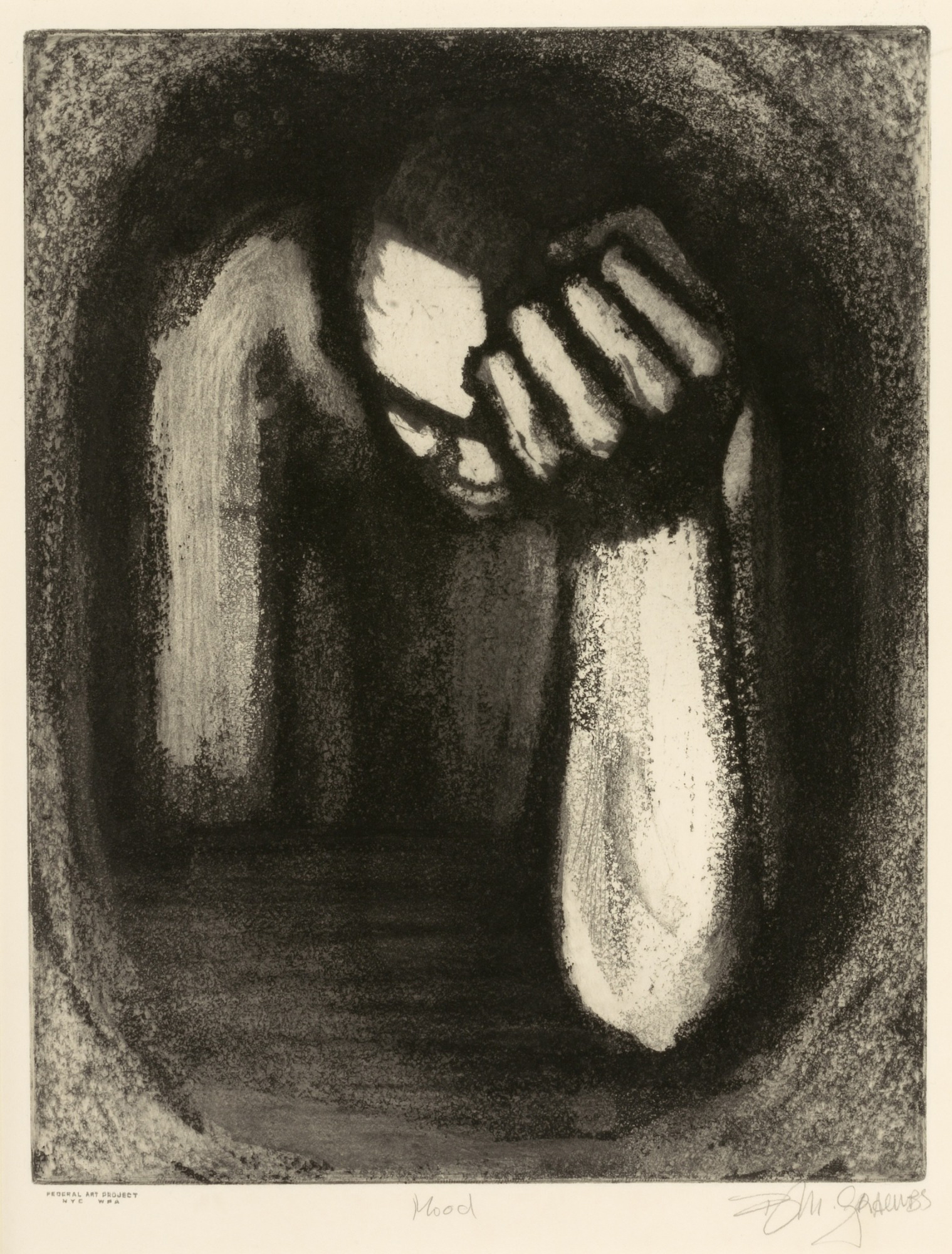
Mood, n.d
