= Peter Rubino =

American master sculptor (born 1947)

Peter Rubino (born 1947) is an American sculptor.

== Early life and education ==
Peter Rubino was born in 1947 in Brooklyn, New York. His formal art training was at the National Academy of Design and the Art Students League in Manhattan, New York

== Commissioned busts ==
He has created commissioned sculptures of well-known actors, such as: American actor, David Canary; American jazz pianist, Dave Brubeck; the leader of the Trinidad and Tobago Teachers Union (TTTU), St. Elmo Gopaul; and NYPD Police officer and hero, Kenneth Hansen of the 61st Precinct, Brooklyn, New York.

== The partnership ==
Forming a business partnership "Rudolf-Rubino Creations" with former U.S. Senator Jack Rudolph, he created busts of Babe Ruth, Ty Cobb, Lawrence Taylor, Don Mattingly, Mickey Mantle, and Lou Gehrig. Former General Manager of the New York Rangers, Phil Esposito, commissioned the partnership to create a figure of the goalie Eddie Giacomin, and it was presented to him when his jersey number was retired.

They met and became friends at the Silvermine Artists Guild, in New Canaan. Mr. Rudolf decided that he would take care of the business details while Mr. Rubino produced the envisioned sculptures.

== Monuments ==
His abstract commissions include: an 11-foot work entitled, "Mother of All Life," at the Boyko Research Center at Ben Gurion University in Beer Sheva, Israel in 1983; a 7-foot sculpture entitled, "Eagle" depicting a boy in the Eagle Scout uniform in 1991; and a 35-foot monumental entitled, "Angel" created for The Walt Disney Company in 1997.

== Publications ==
"The Portrait in Clay" which is distributed world wide by Random House (Watson Guptill) and has been translated into Russian and Chinese.

"Sculpting the Figure in Clay: An Artistic and Technical Journey to Understanding the Creative and Dynamic Forces in Figurative Sculpture" (Watson-Guptill Publications, $32.50, April 27, 2010), foreword written by jazz icon Dave Brubeck, is a comprehensive and instructional guide to sculpting the human figure in clay. This volume lays out a simple, step-by-step method of blocking out the plane structure and anatomy of the posed figure. His technique utilizes a geometric system consisting of blocks, simple shapes, and guidelines, which instructs students with new and instinctive sculptural insight. Sculptural concepts are illustrated through a sequence of photos of the model, taken from every angle in a given pose, with the entire sculpting process shown from start to finish, with accompanying text. The technique covered in this book, including overlays and many photographic reference poses for continued study, is meant to pose as an inspiration, enabling artists to create figures with individual style.

== Teaching career ==
He has taught the art of sculpting for over 35 years. He was an instructor at the Brooklyn Museum Art School, the Silvermine Artists Guild, and The National Academy School of Fine Art in New York City.

Additionally, he teaches annual workshops in the United States and Italy.

He also conducts workshops at the Scottsdale Artists' School in Arizona.

== Videos ==
Mr. Rubino has produced several performance videos demonstrating his art of sculpting: "Symphony in Clay", "Symphony in Clay II", "Extreme Sculpting", "Extreme Sculpting Gone Wild", "Sculpting the Female Torso", "Making of a President", "Peter Rubino Portrait Sculpture Evolution" and "aWARness".

== Workshops ==
=== 2012 ===
- Covert Clay Studio, AZ
- Tuscan Renaissance Center, Italy
- Armory Art Center, West Palm Beach Florida

=== 2011 ===
- Mystic Art Center, Mystic, CT
- National Academy School of Fine Art, NYC
- Brookgreen Gardens, SC
- Tuscan Renaissance Center, Italy
- Covert Clay Studio, AZ

== Exhibitions ==
- 8/23/2012 - Silvermine Arts Center - Faculty Exhibition
