= Val Telberg =

Russian painter

- Born: February 14, 1910; Moscow, Russia
- Died: 1995 (aged 84–85); Southampton, New York
- Known for: painting, photography
- Movement: surrealism

Val Telberg (born Vladimir Telberg-von-Teleheim on February 14, 1910, in Moscow, Russian Empire; died 1995, Southampton, New York) was a Russian-born American artist best known for his photomontages.

== Biography ==
His family moved to China in 1918 and he spent most of his youth there. He received a bachelor of science degree in chemistry from Wittenberg College in 1932. He returned to China, but would emigrate to the United States in 1938.

He studied painting at the Art Student's League, New York, in 1942, where he was exposed to the surrealism movement and experimental film-making. It was here he met his future first wife, Kathleen Lambing (more famous as Kathleen Haven, the name she took after her second marriage), who taught him photography.

For his first professional job in photography, Telberg was a portrait photographer, taking portraits of nightclub patrons in Florida and later Massachusetts. In 1945, he returned to New York and began to create photomontages through double exposure; many of these images had a surreal, dreamlike quality. In 1948, the Brooklyn Museum of Art held an exhibition of the photomontage works he produced with his wife.

In 1987, he had a retrospective exhibition at the Museum of Contemporary Photography. His work is held by the Museum of Modern Art, the J. Paul Getty Museum, the San Francisco Museum of Modern Art, and the Whitney Museum of American Art.
