= Mary Beth McKenzie =

American painter

- Self portrait of Mary Beth McKenzie.
- Born: 1946 (age 79–80); Cleveland, Ohio
- Education: Studied with Robert Philipp, Robert Brackman, Jose Cintron, Daniel Greene, Burton Silverman
- Alma mater: School of the Museum of Fine Arts, Boston; Cooper School of Art, Cleveland; National Academy of Design; Art Students League
- Known for: painter of contemporary figures
- Style: Realism
- Elected: National Academy, 1994
- Website: www.marybethmckenzie.com

Mary Beth McKenzie, N.A. (born 1946) is an American painter of contemporary figures in the realism style. She was born in Cleveland, Ohio and currently resides in New York City where she teaches art at National Academy of Design and the Art Students League of New York.

Her works of art are currently in the collections of the Metropolitan Museum of Art, the National Museum of American Art, the Brooklyn Museum, the Museum of the City of New York, the National Museum of Women in the Arts, the Butler Institute of American Art, the New Britain Museum of American Art, the Art Students League of New York, and the National Academy of Design.

In 2008 the Metropolitan Museum of Art, purchased two monotypes, Front Porch Restaurant and Diner (2nd stage), as well as a plate for Front Porch Restaurant and Diner (2nd stage). The Metropolitan Museum of Art permanent collection also includes thirteen monotypes from McKenzie's Circus as well as three oils and three sketch books also by McKenzie.

McKenzie authored and provided artwork for the book, A Painterly Approach, Watson-Guptill Publications, New York, October 1987. She has also contributed articles to several magazines.

McKenzie was elected to the National Academy in 1994. She has won numerous awards.

She was educated at the Boston Museum of Fine Art, National Academy of Design, and Art Students League of New York, and the Cooper School of Art in Cleveland, and has studied with Robert Brackman, Daniel Greene, and Burton Silverman, among others.

Several of her works appear in the movie Flannel Pajamas.

She was interviewed by Ira Goldberg in the art journal LINEA

McKenzie was featured in a solo show at the Erie Art Museum, "A Life in Art" from July 13 to September 24, 2018.
