= Tom Loepp =

American painter

Tom Loepp (born June 4, 1954) is an American figurative, portrait and landscape painter.

== Life ==
Loepp grew up in Wyoming, Texas, Iowa and Oklahoma. He began his art studies in 1972 at the Art Students Academy in Tulsa, Oklahoma, then moved to New York City in 1976 and studied at the Art Students League of New York; this was followed by a year of travel through Europe. He returned to New York, where he painted cityscapes, some from atop the World Trade Center, and began a career as a portrait painter. In 2001 he returned to Wyoming.

In 1994 Loepp painted a portrait of Chief Justice William Rehnquist for the United States Supreme Court. The painting was subsequently placed near Rehnquist's coffin when his body lay in state after his death in 2005; the New York Times described the painting as showing "the four gold stripes with which the chief justice decorated each sleeve of his judicial robe and depicts him with a slightly bemused expression".

In addition to the Supreme Court, Loepp's paintings are in the collections of the Museum of the City of New York, Stanford Law School, University of Chicago, and William and Flora Hewlett Foundation. He has exhibited at the Brooklyn Museum, the Nicolaysen Art Museum and the Dahl Arts Center in South Dakota.

Loepp has taught drawing and painting in numerous venues, including the Art Students League of New York, the National Academy in New York City and the Gage Academy of Art in Seattle
