= Elias Goldberg =

American painter

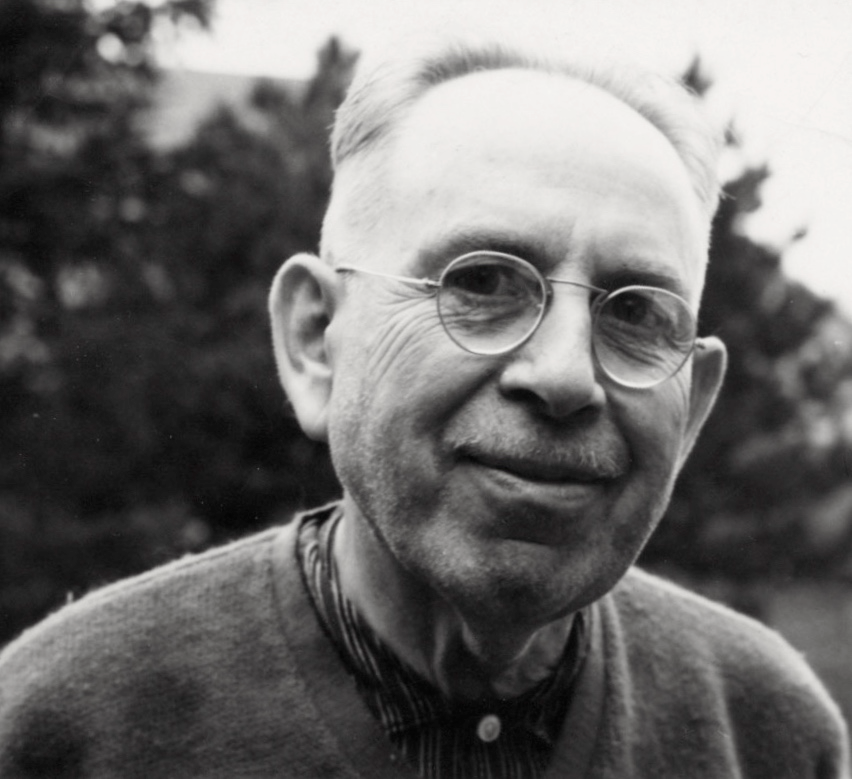
- Born: March 14, 1886; Manhattan, New York City
- Died: February 22, 1978 (aged 91); Manhattan, New York City
- Education: Art Students League of New York
- Known for: Painting
- Awards: Mark Rothko Foundation Grant; Longview Foundation Purchase Award

Signature
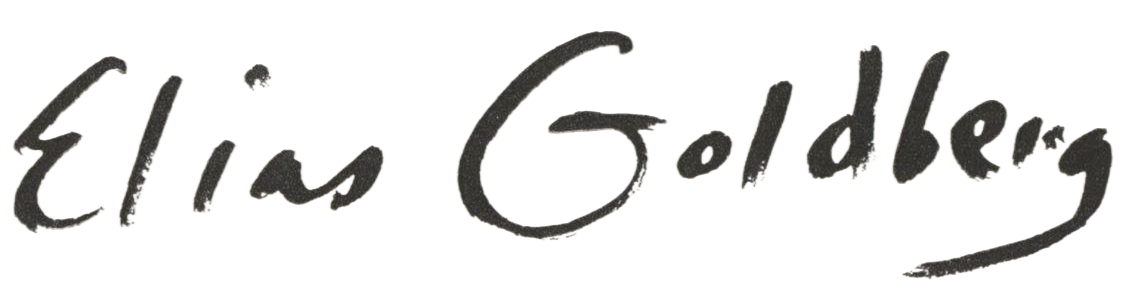

Elias Goldberg (March 14, 1886 – February 22, 1978) was an American painter and illustrator best known for his painterly cityscapes of Washington Heights.

== Biography ==
Elias Goldberg began studying art in 1905 at the Mechanics Institute under Milton Bancroft. From 1906 to 1909, he studied under George Bridgman at the Art Students League of New York. Between 1912 and 1915, he studied with Robert Henri at the Ferrer School in New York. He also studied with Henri at the Art Students League.

At the invitation of Max Eastman, his illustrations were published in The Masses (1915–16) and later in The Liberator (magazine) (1919–20), two prominent American socialist magazines. He associated with artists connected to The Masses including William Gropper, Maurice Becker, Stuart Davis, Henry Glintenkamp, and Glenn Coleman.

Goldberg illustrated several children’s books, including Insect Adventures (1917), an English-language adaptation of Souvenirs Entomologiques by the French entomologist Jean Henri Fabre, and Leonore E. Muleta’s Sunshine Lands of Europe (World Book Company, 1918).

Between 1917 and 1918 he attended sketch classes and exhibited at the Penguin Club, an art club founded by Walt Kuhn, where he met Jules Pascin. In 1918 he was in the second annual exhibition of the Society of Independent Artists. During the 1920s he worked as an illustrator for the Japan Paper Company and for Hal Marchbanks Press.

Goldberg spent 1924 and 1925 in France and Spain, describing his time in Paris, Madrid, and Toledo as formative. He recalled having known Man Ray in New York and being familiar with the Dada circle. Marcel Duchamp was a periodic visitor to Goldberg’s New York studio, where they discussed art and modernism. Goldberg described Duchamp as “a remarkable guy,” though he expressed reservations about Duchamp’s anti-painting position within modernism.

In 1935 he had his first solo show at Another Place Gallery. In January 1948 he had a solo show, titled "The City" at the Charles Egan Gallery just before Willem de Kooning's first solo show at the Egan Gallery in April. Elaine de Kooning wrote an essay about the show titled "New York without Tears" (The Paintings of Elias Goldberg). In 1951 his work was shown in a group show of Egan Gallery Artists including Willem de Kooning, Franz Kline, and Isamu Noguchi.

In the 1950s, he befriended a younger generation of artists including Herman Rose, Knox Martin, Joseph Stapleton, Peter Golfinopoulos, and Julius Hatofsky. In the 1960s he had a series of critically acclaimed solo shows at the Charles Egan Gallery.

In 1973 he received a grant from the Mark Rothko Foundation. Elias Goldberg died on February 22, 1978, in New York City.

His paintings, watercolors, and drawings are in the Hirshhorn Museum and Sculpture Garden, the Blanton Museum of Art, the Philadelphia Museum of Art, the MIT Permanent Collection, and various private collections.

== Style and subjects ==
Goldberg is best known for painting cityscapes of Upper Manhattan, especially Washington Heights, where he lived from 1945 onward. His paintings depict the neighborhood’s apartment houses, rooftops, streets, bridges, water towers, the Harlem River, and the George Washington Bridge, favoring the everyday urban landscape of northern Manhattan over New York’s more familiar monuments and skyscrapers. Art historian William H. Gerdts described Goldberg's cityscapes as extending a New York urban tradition associated with the Ashcan School, while also noting their Post-Impressionist approach to color and brushwork.

Elaine de Kooning emphasized the painterly quality of Goldberg’s city views, writing that he “does not describe, interpret or record a scene; he paints a picture and the scene occurs in it.”

== Selected works ==
| Title | Medium | Date | Located | Image |
|---|---|---|---|---|
| Conversations | Oil on canvas | 1967 | Hirshhorn Museum and Sculpture Garden | |
| Untitled (Abstract Cityscape) | Oil on canvas | 1962 | Blanton Museum of Art | |
| The City | Oil on canvas | 1963 | Private Collection | |
| The City | Oil on canvas | 1962 | The Helen W. and Robert M. Benjamin Collection | |
| Interior | Oil on canvas | c. 1965 | Private Collection | |
| Self Portrait | Oil on canvas | c. 1935 | Private Collection | |
| Self Portrait | Oil on canvas | c. 1958 | Private Collection | |
| "Not All Atrocities Are Confined to War" | Ink on paper | 1915 | Published in The Masses | |
| Untitled | Graphite on paper | 1917 | Published in Spawn | |
| "Citizen: 'Say, why don't you reform?'....." | Pen and ink on paper | 1919 | Published in The Liberator (magazine) | |

== Articles ==
- Lawrence Campbell, "Elias Goldberg Paints a Picture", ARTnews, 1963
- Rosalind Constable, "The Pissarro of Washington Heights", New York Magazine, July 1970
- William H. Gerdts, "From Ashcan to Abstract: The Paintings of Elias Goldberg", Elias Goldberg Exhibition Catalogue, Janos Gat Gallery, 1999
- Elaine de Kooning, "New York Without Tears: The Paintings of Elias Goldberg", Egan Gallery, 1948

== Additional references ==
- Bruce Hooton 1965 Interview of Elias Goldberg at the Smithsonian Archives of American Art
- Works of Elias Goldberg, Joseph H. Hirshhorn Bequest at the Hirshhorn Museum and Sculpture Garden
- Works of Elias Goldberg, Blanton Museum of Art
