= Saburo Hasegawa =

Japanese-American artist

Saburō Hasegawa
- 長谷川 三郎
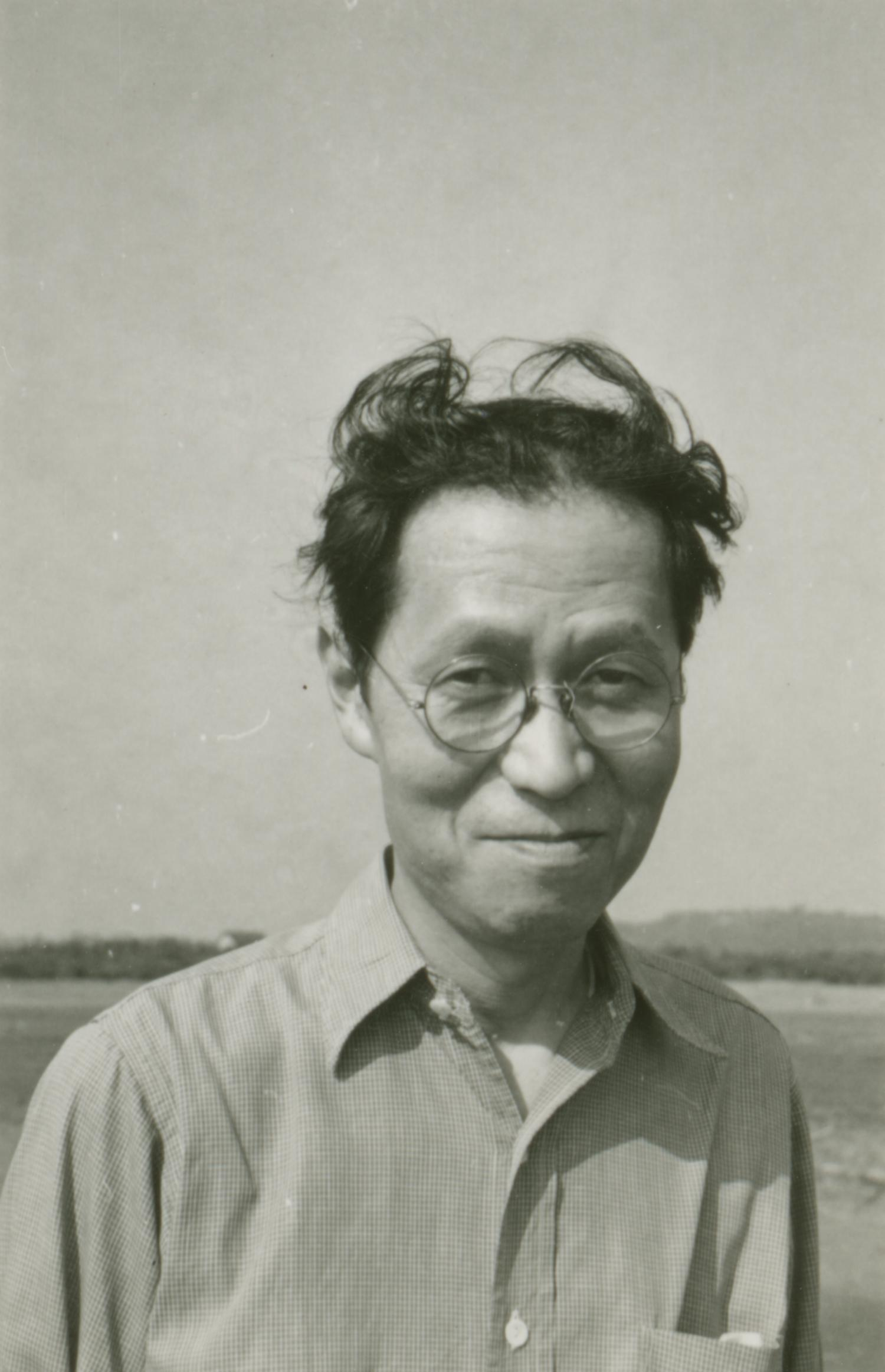
- Born: 6 September 1906; Yamaguchi Prefecture, Japan
- Died: 11 March 1957 (aged 50); San Francisco, California, U.S.
- Education: Tokyo Imperial University
- Occupations: calligrapher, artist, educator, critic
- Known for: Painting, art criticism, Japanese traditional arts
- Style: Abstraction, Calligraphy

Saburō Hasegawa (長谷川 三郎, Hasegawa Saburō; 6 September 1906 – 11 March 1957) was a Japanese-born American calligrapher, painter, art writer, curator, and teacher. He was an early advocate of abstract art in Japan and an equally vocal supporter of the Japanese traditional arts (Japanese calligraphy, ikebana, tea ceremony, ink painting) and Zen Buddhism. Throughout his career he argued for the connection between East Asian classical arts and Western abstract painting.

== Biography ==
=== Early life: 1906–1929 ===
Saburō Hasegawa was born in Yamaguchi Prefecture in 1906, the fifth of eleven children. His father was an executive for Mitsui & Co. who had worked in London and Hong Kong. In 1910, when his father was transferred to Kobe for work, the family relocated to nearby Ashiya and lived in a European-style home. Hasegawa learned English during his school years, and together with three friends, formed an art club known as the Hakuzōkai (White Elephant Group). In 1924, Hasegawa began to study under the post-impressionist painter Narashige Koide in Osaka. In 1926, against his father's wishes, Hasegawa entered the art history department of Tokyo Imperial University (today University of Tokyo). He graduated in 1929 with a thesis discussing the famous ink painter of the Muromachi period, Sesshū Tōyō.

=== Early career: 1930s ===
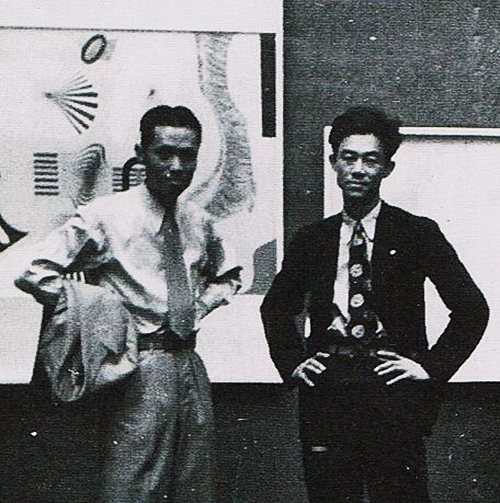
24th Nika Exhibition venue (1937) with Saburo Hasegawa (left) and Jiro Yoshihara (right).

From 1929 to 1932, Hasegawa traveled to San Francisco, New York, Boston, England, France, Spain, and Italy. His work Still Life (Vegetable) (1930) was accepted for exhibition at the 1931 Salon d'Automne in Paris. Hasegawa lived in Paris for 19 months, where he was able to witness and study the new developments in modern art. While in Paris, he married a Dutch woman named Viola de Boer (dates unknown). He returned to Japan in 1932 following the unexpected death of his father.

Hasegawa and de Boers divorced in 1936 after having one daughter, Sumire (1934-1996). He married his second wife, Kiyoko (1913-2006) in October 1936. Together they had one son, Shōbu (1940-2015), and one daughter, Michiko (b. 1943).

Hasegawa helped reorganize a prominent oil painting exhibition society as the Jiyū Bijutsuka Kyōkai ("Free Artists Association") in 1937. The society became a champion of abstraction in the Japanese art world. In the late 1930s, Hasegawa began to explore media besides painting, including photography. In 1938, Hasegawa traveled to China to visit his brother who was stationed there for military service. The trip inspired him to take up photography, and the scenery, in particular the ancient Buddhist cave temples, inspired him to work in modernist photographic modes. He exhibited his documentary photography with the Jiyū Bijutsuka Kyōkai.

==== "Old Japan and New West" ====
Beginning in the 1930s, Hasegawa's activities showed a dual interest in European modern art and in Japanese art history. In 1937, Hasegawa published the first book on abstraction in Japan, titled Abusutorakuto āto (Abstract Art). And throughout the 1930s, he published articles on recent developments in European art, and articles on the classical art of East Asia, including "On Sesshū" (1934) and "Avant-Garde Art and Eastern Classics" (1937). Hasegawa found inherent connections between these two fields. His theory of "Old Japan and New West" was conceived around this time. It identified parallels between contemporary Western art and traditional classical arts from Japan and China, arguing that modern artists in Euroamerica and in Japan found these influences equally inspirational. In Abusutorakuto āto, for example, he linked abstract painting to classical Japanese calligraphy. He continued to explore these themes for the rest of his career.

=== Wartime activities: 1940–1948 ===
Hasegawa continued to produce photographs during World War II. He was arrested in 1940 for refusing to participate in war drills. After his short jail sentence, Hasegawa moved his family to Nagahama, north of Kyoto, where they spent the rest of the war in extreme poverty. During this time, Hasegawa began subsistence farming and all but stopped creating artwork or writing art essays. He began to study Daoism and Zen Buddhism in more depth and visited and corresponded with Zen priests and Buddhist scholars. He also studied the tea ceremony of the Mushanokōji school.

=== Postwar career: 1948–1957 ===
In 1948, Hasegawa again began publishing essays on art and creating modernist oil paintings. He continued to be fascinated by Japanese historical culture, but also revived his interest in European modernism. In the early 1950s, Hasegawa completely abandoned oil painting and began creating works using traditional Japanese materials, including ink, paper, and woodblock printing. He also began a highly experimental series of photograms – a return to his earlier photographic practices from the 1930s. By 1955, Hasegawa's work had received unexpected critical acclaim in the United States, while it was largely ignored in Japan. In 1955, he permanently moved with his family to the United States.

==== Relationship with Isamu Noguchi ====
Because Hasegawa was both fluent in English and already held a respected position in the Japanese art world, he was invited to work as a guide for Japanese American artist Isamu Noguchi during Noguchi's trip to Japan in 1950. Hasegawa and Noguchi visited landmark sites together including the Katsura Imperial Villa, Ryōan-ji, and Ise Shrine. Over the course of the trip, they discovered they had much in common and became close friends. Noguchi was excited to have access to lesser-known sites of Japanese art and culture, and his own art reflected certain Japanese aesthetic qualities. Hasegawa felt that this enthusiasm for Japanese tradition displayed by Noguchi, a modern artist, helped legitimize his own belief in the convergence of Japanese tradition and modern art.

Hasegawa published numerous articles on Noguchi's work. Their relationship and exchanges gained significant media attention. According to art historian Kitazawa Noriaki, Noguchi's trip to Japan may have been the catalyst for a series of intellectual debates that occurred in Japan in the 1950s on the meaning of Japanese tradition in modern art, architecture, and society. This is commonly known as the "Tradition Dispute" (dentō ronsō).

==== Activity in New York ====
Hasegawa was invited by the American Abstract Artists group to curate an exhibition of Asian abstract art in New York City. Hasegawa travelled to New York in 1954, where he helped install the exhibition at the Riverside Museum in Manhattan. The exhibition included the work of ten artists, of which Hasegawa was one, and was the first of its kind to be held in the United States. Hasegawa also helped select artists for the 1954 exhibition at the Museum of Modern Art in New York, Japanese Calligraphy. He attended the opening of the exhibition. Hasegawa met Sari Dienes, and was photographed with her at the Hotel Beaux Arts dated 1954. They became friends, and he visited her studio at 58 West 57th Street often. They both showed at Gumps Gallery in San Francisco, before Sari left to visit Japan.

Hasegawa had two solo exhibitions at galleries in New York, which drew prominent New York art world figures. He was also had several new essays published in American publications such as ARTnews.

==== Activity in San Francisco ====
Hasegawa moved to San Francisco in September 1955, where he taught drawing and Asian art history at the California College of Arts and Crafts (CCAC), and lectured at the American Academy of Asian Studies (AAAS). Hasegawa played an important role in spreading the teachings of Zen to the artistic community in San Francisco, notably to the Beat poets. Hasegawa had several exhibitions in the Bay area, including at CCAC, the department store Gump's, the Oakland Art Museum, and the San Francisco Museum of Modern Art. He also curated an exhibition of Japanese art for the Oakland Art Museum.

Hasegawa died of oral cancer in San Francisco in 1957. His work was subsequently featured in several memorial and group exhibitions in the United States.

== Work ==
=== Paintings and prints ===
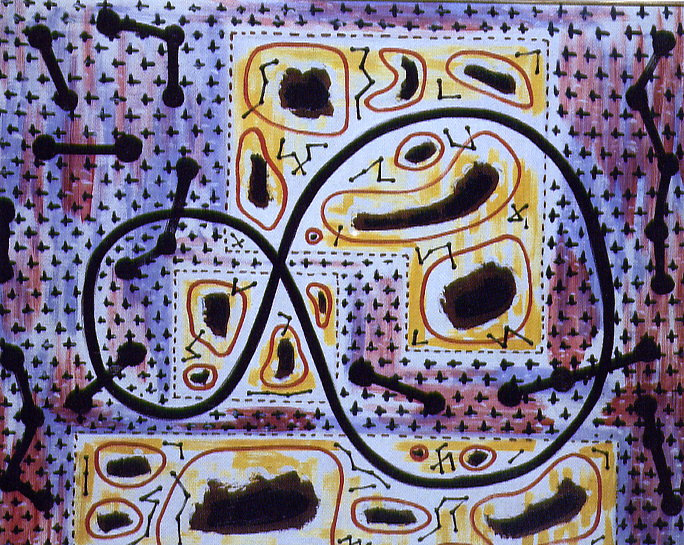
Hasegawa Saburo, Cho no kiseki (Traces of a Butterfly), 1937. Oil on canvas, 130x163 cm. National Museum of Modern Art, Kyoto.

Hasegawa's earliest works were oil paintings in the Fauvist or post-impressionist style. By the mid-1930s, when he first became involved with the Free Artists Association, Hasegawa's work was transitioning into abstraction, and he began experimenting with collage using materials such as yarn and glass. During World War II, Hasegawa largely stopped painting, with the exception of a series of landscape and still life oil paintings completed in 1943.

After the war, Hasegawa's paintings of the late 1940s began to explore imagery from prehistoric Japanese art, including artifacts from the Jōmon, Yayoi, and Kofun periods. This was a form of primitivism and Orientalism but specifically focused on Japanese culture, and was largely inspired by his "Old Japan and New West" theory. His interest in prehistoric Japan resonated with the postwar work of other Japanese artists such as Tarō Okamoto, who was also examining ancient artifacts but was largely inspired by the primitivism of Parisian modernists.

Around 1951, Hasegawa stopped working in oil painting and instead devoted himself to creating prints and ink paintings, and to exploring photography through photograms. Some of his ink paintings from this time closely approached avant-garde calligraphy practiced by calligraphers such as the members of the group Bokujinkai in the 1950s. Avant-garde calligraphy focused on the form of ink lines but often resulted in abstract art rather than conveying any legible characters. Hasegawa's paintings from this time thus merged the gesturalism of Japanese calligraphy with the spontaneity of postwar Western gestural abstraction. Hasegawa also created paintings in ink wash. His prints were monotypes in watercolor, gouache, or ink, made with kamaboko-ita (rectangular pieces of wood used to steam kamaboko, or fish cakes, in Japan) and funaita (ship planks) as the printing blocks. He also created ink rubbings, and mixed media pieces that combined any of the above techniques.

=== Photography ===
Hasegawa first encountered experimental photography and photograms through European and American magazines reproducing works by artists such as Man Ray and László Moholy-Nagy. His first photographic works were in the documentary tradition, taken during his trip to China in 1938, where he composed experimental shots of Buddhist cave sculptures. He later produced a series of documentary photographs in 1939, entitled Kyōdoshi ("Local Journal"), in which he explored local village life through images with a distinctly modernist framing. The photographs paid careful attention to framing, modeling, and the sculptural quality of the captured subject. He exhibited several of these photographs with the Jiyū Bijutsuka Kyōkai in 1940.

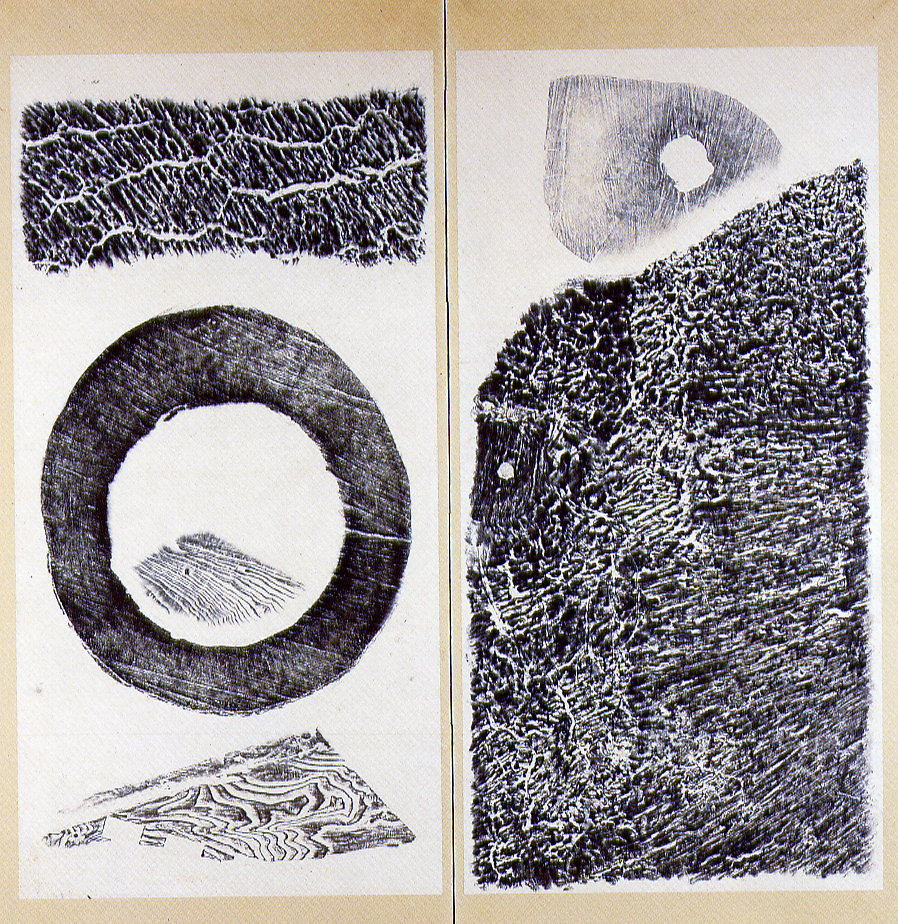
Hasegawa Saburo, Nature, 1953. Ink on paper, 135x66 cm. National Museum of Modern Art, Kyoto.

After the war, Hasegawa began experimenting more with photography. From 1953 to 1954, he created a series of collaborative works with the photographer Kiyoji Ōtsuji and other artists from Jikken Kōbō for the Asahi Picture News. Hasegawa arranged a collage which was photographed by Ōtsuji, resulting in a mixed media photographic work.

=== Writing ===
Hasegawa wrote extensively on European modernism, introducing Japanese artists to Surrealism and Abstract expressionism. He published articles on European modern artists including Henri Rousseau, Paul Klee, Wassily Kandsinky, Henri Matisse, and Pablo Picasso. At the same time, he published numerous articles on Japanese artists including Tawaraya Sōtatsu, Narashige Koide, and Ike no Taiga. Since the 1930s, many of his writings probed the intersections between "Old Japan and New West," with articles including "Letters from France and America" (1951), "Making Katsura Imperial Villa Abstract" (1951), and "Calligraphy and New Painting" (1951). His writings have been characterized as embodying a "cosmopolitan transnationalism" that was "in between East and West."

==== Writing on calligraphy ====
In the 1930s, and again in the 1950s, Hasegawa encouraged new developments in avant-garde calligraphy, especially as a new form of abstract painting. From 1950 to 1953, he promoted new experiments in calligraphy by editing the column "Alpha Section of Selection and Criticism" for the calligraphy journals Sho no bi and Bokubi – two periodicals edited by Morita Shiryū of the Bokujinkai calligraphy group. Hasegawa selected and reviewed works of abstract calligraphy in the column. Hasegawa also contributed several articles to Bokubi in which he theorized (as he had in the 1930s) a particular relationship between abstract painting and calligraphy, including a series entitled "Reflections on New Western and Old Eastern Art." Hasegawa also introduced the works of Franz Kline to a Japanese audience by publishing and analyzing them in Bokubi. Noguchi had first introduced Hasegawa to Kline's paintings during their trip in 1950.

The parallels Hasegawa discussed between Western abstract art and Japanese calligraphy deeply inspired the calligraphers of Bokujinkai and contributed to their early theoretical foundations.

== Collections and exhibitions ==
Hasegawa's work is held in several permanent collections including the San Francisco Museum of Modern Art, the National Museum of Modern Art, Tokyo, the National Museum of Modern Art, Kyoto, and the National Museum of Art, Osaka.

In 2019, Hasegawa's work was included in the exhibition "Changing and Unchanging things: Noguchi and Hasegawa in Postwar Japan" organized by the Noguchi Museum. The exhibition included around 90 works from Hasegawa and Noguchi, and featured Hasegawa's paintings, calligraphic drawings and some of his poems.
