= The Mellow Pad =

Painting by Stuart Davis

- Artist: Stuart Davis
- Year: 1945–1951
- Medium: oil on canvas
- Dimensions: 66.7 cm × 107 cm (26.3 in × 42 in)
- Location: Brooklyn Museum of Art, Brooklyn, New York

The Mellow Pad is a 1945–1951 jazz-inspired painting by American modernist painter Stuart Davis. It is held by the Brooklyn Museum of Art in Brooklyn, New York.

== Description ==
The origins of The Mellow Pad lie in an earlier 1931 painting by Davis titled House and Street, now held by the Whitney Museum of American Art. Davis was deeply inspired by jazz music; the painting's title "The Mellow Pad" is a jazz term for the satisfying emotional state reached during a "sweet spot" in the music. He also attributed his vibrant color and style to jazz, and the painting's irregular dots, arcs, curves, and shapes visually parallel the music's syncopated rhythms.

Amidst its complex and abstract patterns, the painting does retain structure. Near the center of the painting, a vertical black bar divides the composition in half, thus acting as the painting's focal point. This bar can be traced back to a similar central divide found in House and Street.

Davis worked on The Mellow Pad intermittently for about six years from 1945 to 1951. Upon completing the composition, Davis remarked that he felt "probably the most objective Art realization of my life" since he believed he had successfully captured a jazz experience using only abstract forms. As a result, The Mellow Pad proves to be not only a pivotal moment in Davis's career but also an anticipation of new art movements less grounded in realism such as abstract expressionism. Some even describe The Mellow Pad as Davis's seminal work.

== Exhibition ==
The Mellow Pad is currently in the American Art Galleries of the Brooklyn Museum. In 2015, the museum was awarded a grant to study the work using non-invasive techniques such as optical coherence tomography. The analysis found evidence indicative of Davis's unique technique and painting process, as well as some discoloration in the painting.

From June 30, 2016 to January 8, 2018, many of Davis's works, including The Mellow Pad, were featured in the exhibition Stuart Davis: In Full Swing. The exhibition was displayed at the National Gallery of Art in Washington, D.C., the Whitney Museum of American Art in New York City, the Fine Arts Museums of San Francisco, and the Crystal Bridges Museum of American Art in Bentonville, Arkansas.
