= Bokujinkai =

Japanese calligraphy group

Bokujinkai (墨人会, “People of the Ink,” est. 1952) is a Japanese calligraphy collective, research group, and exhibition society. It was founded by the calligraphers Shiryū Morita, Yūichi Inoue, Sōgen Eguchi, Yoshimichi Sekiya, and Bokushi Nakamura.

Although still active today, Bokujinkai remains best known for its activities in the 1950s, when its members helped advance avant-garde calligraphy (前衛書, zen’ei sho) or modern calligraphy (現代書, gendai sho) both in Japan and internationally.

== History ==
=== Establishment ===
Bokujinkai was established by Morita, Inoue, Eguchi, Yoshimichi, and Nakamura on January 5, 1952 at Ryōanji in Kyoto. All five members were students of the experimental calligrapher Sōkyū Ueda. The formation of Bokujinkai can be seen as a formal split from both the calligraphy establishment and from other avant-garde calligraphers.

=== Background and split from Keiseikai ===
The formation of Bokujinkai was heavily influenced by the landscape of the Japanese calligraphy world in the years following the end of World War II. In general, since the Meiji period, calligraphy had been excluded from the realm of high art and was not included in official salon exhibitions until 1948. The general public saw it as old-fashioned and stagnant, and this reputation only solidified during the U.S. Occupation, when calligraphy was characterized as feudalistic and removed from educational curriculum. This shocking public rejection of calligraphy during the Occupation on the one hand, combined with the hope promised by its admission into the salon on the other hand, catalyzed calligraphers, particularly the members of Bokujinkai, to proactively modernize calligraphy.

By the early postwar period in Japan, various innovative, modern styles of calligraphy had already crystallized: kindaishi bunsho (近代詩文書, calligraphy of modern poetry), shōjisūsho (少字数書, calligraphy of a few characters), and zen’ei sho (前衛書, avant-garde calligraphy increasingly divorced from written characters and their meanings). The growth of zen’ei sho upset conservative calligraphers in the calligraphy establishment, and created a tense, ongoing conflict between traditional and experimental calligraphers. The founders of Bokujinkai believed that avant-garde calligraphers had become too mired in this conflict, and as a result, there was not enough attention being paid to the future of calligraphy.

All five of the initial Bokujinkai members had been part of another avant-garde calligraphy group known as Keiseikai (奎星会, “Group of the Megrez Star”), which was founded in November 1940 by Ueda, Morita, and another of Ueda's students, Sesson Uno. Before World War II, Ueda and his teacher Hidai Tenrai had been early proponents of experimental calligraphy. In the early postwar years, however, the five Bokujinkai founders felt that Ueda was too invested in winning conflicts with the calligraphy establishment, and that this myopic focus was preventing necessary international connections and opportunities for Japanese calligraphers. They also thought that Ueda was still conforming to the traditional hierarchies of the calligraphy world by adopting an “authoritarian” position over his students. Forming Bokujinkai was thus an opportunity to emancipate themselves from the master-student hierarchy and to begin working on their own as individual artists with global mindsets. At the same time, to the extent that much of Bokujinkai's experimental calligraphy, network of supporters in the art and calligraphy worlds, and monthly journals all originated with Keiseikai, Bokujinkai may be considered an offshoot and development of that group.

=== Manifesto ===
Bokujinkai's manifesto was published in the inaugural issue of their journal Bokujin in April 1952. The manifesto declared the current practice of calligraphy “impoverished” due to its long isolation from modern art, and called for opening up the world of calligraphy to outside interests and artists, especially those outside of Japan: “We fully realize that we now stand at a pivotal moment: can the art of calligraphy, which has been guarding its long tradition in one corner of the Orient, revitalize itself as a true contemporary art, or will the very category [of calligraphy] become extinguished by being completely absorbed by progressive artists?” Finally, the group proclaimed independence from any extant calligraphy group, arguing that it was only by separating themselves from “existing institutions” that they could pursue the path of the avant-garde.

=== Early activity ===
Bokujinkai's early years may be characterized by their most experimental works and their greatest efforts to push the boundaries of calligraphy in Japan and abroad. Within Japan, the group focused on innovating the practice of calligraphy and expanding the field by collaborating with modern artists. For example, Bokujinkai hosted and participated in many roundtable discussions with modern artists and calligraphers to discuss the status of painting and calligraphy, both in Japan and in the West.

In further efforts to widen the audience of calligraphy, Bokujinkai also spent considerable effort in their early years on outreach to the Western art world. Morita sent copies of the group's monthly journal Bokubi to prominent galleries in New York and Paris. Bokujinkai was able to establish contact with prominent artists including Franz Kline, Pierre Alechinsky, Pierre Soulages, L. Alcopley, Georges Mathieu, and other artists who were working in Abstract Expressionist or Tachiste painting styles loosely comparably to calligraphy.

Bokujinkai's correspondence with Franz Kline was especially fruitful in the early 1950s. Morita featured Kline's paintings in the first issue of Bokubi in 1951, thus demonstrating his own commitment to the international expansion of calligraphy. Kline's paintings, despite being oil on canvas, consisted of bold black strokes on white grounds and appeared strikingly close to Bokujinkai's avant-garde calligraphy. Bokujinkai sent the first issue of Bokubi to Kline, who responded positively, and both parties continued to exchange periodicals and images of their works. Critics questioned the influence of calligraphy on Kline's work and vice versa, but it seems that both parties arrived at a similar visual expression around the same time. For Bokujinkai, the discovery of Kline's work and their friendly correspondence with him was a sign that calligraphy could achieve international artistic importance. As Kline's reputation in the U.S. grew, however, he began to distance himself from Bokujinkai and assert that his paintings were in fact quite different from Japanese calligraphy. This was likely due to a growing artistic nationalism surrounding Abstract Expressionism in New York, rather than a decisive break between Kline and Bokujinkai.

In addition to direct connection with artists, Bokujinkai's early efforts at international outreach yielded concrete results in the organization of several exhibitions at prominent international venues.

=== Later activity ===
Most scholars divide Bokujinkai's early, internationally minded activities from their later, more insular calligraphic practice. By the 1960s, in response to growing dismissal and negative criticism from Western and Japanese critics, as well as explosive growth in avant-garde painting and installation, Bokujinkai members began to focus more on their own calligraphy and internal activities rather than global or even cross-genre outreach. Some founding members, including Eguchi, ended up quitting the group due to its increasingly hierarchical organization under Morita, which he felt negated the original goals of the group.

Today, the group maintains an active, stratified membership system and is led by calligraphers such as Sōsai Inada, a former student of Morita. In addition to internal group exhibitions and events, the group also conducts calligraphy research and publishes catalogues of former Bokujinkai members’ works.

== Philosophy ==
=== Early interests ===
==== Avant-gardism ====
Bokujinkai labeled themselves as “avant-garde,” but their notion of avant-gardism was different than avant-garde artists in Europe who attacked the very notion of art. Although many of the group member's early works blurred the line between calligraphy and painting, the group's intention was not to dismantle the field of calligraphy itself, but to legitimize calligraphy as a form of modern art equivalent to painting. The goal was not to reject tradition, but to embrace it and insist on its inherent overlaps with and relevance to modern art.

Bokujinkai's avant-gardism aligned more closely with European avant-gardism at the level of cultural and political critique. Their manifesto called for the democratization of the highly stratified calligraphic establishment in Japan, and they aspired to create a horizontal power structure within Bokujinkai.

==== Internationalization ====
In their writings and roundtable discussions, Bokujinkai advocated for the sekai-sei (世界性, world relevance) of calligraphy. The group believed that international recognition was one way to prove to the calligraphy establishment that it needed to expand, innovate, and modernize in order to maintain its relevance.

Bokujiinkai's early efforts to achieve international connections with postwar European and American artists stemmed in part from a 1948 article written by Morita entitled “Like a Rainbow.” In the article Morita envisioned a metaphorical rainbow where the arc of Japanese calligraphy and the arc of European and American abstract painting could ultimately merge into a bridge spanning the globe. One of the key ways to achieve this vision, according to Morita, was to encourage an appreciation of calligraphy based primarily on its formal qualities, similar to painting. By celebrating the formal rather than the lexical qualities of calligraphy, foreign viewers who could not read Japanese could still appreciate calligraphy as an art, and this would open calligraphy to a greater international audience.

Bokujinkai's early global outreach was successful in part because it coincided in the U.S. and Europe with a postwar interest in Japanese art and aesthetics and the practice and philosophy of Zen. Bokujinkai's internationalizing philosophy was influenced by the work of scholars Shin’ichi Hisamatsu, Tsutomu Ijima, and D.T. Suzuki, all of whom believed that Zen thought, although native to Japan, could function as a global philosophy that might supersede Western modes of thought. Similarly, Bokujinkai saw their work as something capable of world relevance, but nonetheless rooted in fundamental philosophies of Japanese culture.

==== Form and style ====
Morita was instrumental in codifying some of the formal artistic principles that inform calligraphy. In 1953, he first theorized that calligraphy was based on three broad properties: 1) time (both the duration required to read and to write the character with a brush), 2) space (the way the composition and quality of line filled the blank page), and 3) literary value (the written character). The first two properties overlapped with abstract painting, and the third property was what distinguished calligraphy from abstract painting. Bokujinkai members further theorized how calligraphic line and space might be different from line and space in oil paintings.

Bokujinkai members were also influenced both by primitivism in Euro-American modern art, and more specifically by Saburō Hasegawa’s theory of “Old Japan and New West.” As a result, in their early activities, they actively researched ancient and premodern Sino-Japanese calligraphy and incorporated formal elements of it into their own avant-garde practices.

==== Moji-sei ====
Bokujinkai members participated in a major debate that permeated early postwar Japanese calligraphy: the value of moji-sei (文字性, essence of the written character) in calligraphy. At the time, some calligraphers argued that as long as the formal qualities of calligraphic brushwork were visible, there was no actual necessity to write legible moji (written characters). This assertion troubled even experimental calligraphers, who despite their desire to break new ground, were nonetheless traditionally trained and felt that the character and expressing it through brush formed the foundation of calligraphy.

Morita, in his early writings and activities, was initially supportive of calligraphy that discarded moji-sei. Other Bokujinkai members, including Inoue, actually tried producing works with no lexical referent. Despite his support for experimentation, in 1953, Morita decisively asserted that moji-sei was the essence of calligraphy. Moji-sei became a key area in which Bokujinkai's desire for world relevance came into conflict with their core goal of modernizing calligraphy. Disregarding moji-sei ironically brought calligraphy closer to painting, but it also suggested the end of calligraphy as a distinct practice – if only the formal qualities of the brushstroke mattered, then calligraphy might as well be the same as painting. Bokujinkai hoped to rescue calligraphy via modernization, but in disregarding moji-sei they pointed a path to its absorption by Abstract Expressionist painting.

By 1957, Morita and other Bokujinkai members returned to the emphasizing moji-sei and ceased creating works not based on written characters. Morita in particular began to champion moji-sei as a key element that separated Japanese calligraphy from Western painting. This renewed interest in moji-sei was increasingly reflected in the content of the group's monthly journals, which turned away from discussions of modern abstract art and toward studies of premodern Chinese and Japanese calligraphy.

=== Later beliefs ===
Since the 1960s, Bokujinkai has remained heavily focused on producing avant-garde calligraphy, organizing group exhibitions, demonstrating calligraphy, and researching and publishing on calligraphy of the past. Most of the current membership are either students of Morita or students of his students. Morita's general philosophies seem to inform much of the group's identity, specifically his notion that calligraphy is “a space to write characters, where one’s vibrant inner life dances out and is given shape.” Rather than an expansive mission, today's Bokujinkai focuses more on preservation of the avant-garde style it helped create.

== Artworks ==
=== General style ===
The five founders of Bokujinkai did not begin with a cohesive group style. Each brought his own form of experimentation to the group, and the acceptance of various styles and outlooks underscored the group's emphasis on individual artistic freedom.

Over time a loose style emerged in Morita's work that is reflected in the works of other Bokujinkai members. Representative calligraphy works in this style are typically large-scale compositions of shōjisūsho (少字数書, calligraphy of a few characters) executed in fat, expressive brushstrokes that emphasize the spread, drip, and splatter of ink. The expression of the calligrapher's brush and bodily movement is more heavily emphasized than the legibility of the character itself. Some calligraphers – especially in the early years of Bokujinkai – experimented with different materials including enormous brushes, household brooms, oil paint, encaustic, enamel, lacquer, and even colored inks or paints. It is now widely acknowledged that this mode of calligraphy has much in common with Western abstract painting.

Today this style is largely considered a separate category of calligraphy called zen’ei sho (前衛書, avant-garde calligraphy). Some critics call it simply gendai sho (現代書, modern calligraphy), because this genre of calligraphy is now fairly mainstream and no longer “avant-garde.” Many calligraphers who are part of the contemporary Keiseikai also continue to work in this mode, and this general style should therefore not be considered unique to Bokujinkai members. However, with its aggressively international activities in the 1950s, Bokujinkai may be credited with spreading awareness of this style throughout Japan and abroad.

=== Individual works ===
Yūichi Inoue produced a series of works with no lexical referent in 1955–1956. These works made use of nontraditional materials such as black enamel on kraft paper brushed with a handmaid broom, and were finished with a clear, glossy coat to give them a smooth, hard surface like that of oil paintings. The wide brushstrokes in these works reveal the texture of the broom's bristles, especially at the edges of the strokes where the bristles appear to have splayed from the force of Inoue's body. Despite the visible motion of the brushstrokes, without reference to a specific character, it is difficult to tell where Inoue started and completed the work, giving the overall image a sense of chaotic, whirling energy. And unlike traditional calligraphy, the brushstrokes also exit the boundaries of the paper and leave very little negative space, aligning the style more closely with the “all over” method associated with painters such as Claude Monet, Mark Tobey, and Jackson Pollock. The works in the series are titled simply Work No. 1, Work No. 2, etc., further emphasizing the lack of any written characters, and the overlap with abstract painting. Following the eventual insistence on moji-sei (文字性, essence of the written character) by Bokujinkai members, however, Inoue later returned to works writing specific characters.

Shiryū Morita’s works are almost entirely large-scale works of a few characters brushed in ink on paper. Like Inoue, his works emphasize dramatic self-expression through ink, and he continued to experiment with unusual materials even while preserving moji-sei in his later works. For example, his 1969 work Ryū wa ryū o shiru (龍知龍,“Dragon Knows Dragon”) located at the Art Institute of Chicago is highly expressive and difficult to read, but nonetheless features three distinct characters that seem to correspond to those in the title. Though painted on a traditional Japanese folding screen, the ground is solid black paper rather than white, and the calligraphy is applied with a metallic paint covered in yellow varnish to appear gold. The work simultaneously flips the color scheme of ink-on-paper calligraphy, and calls to mind traditional Japanese screens executed on gold paper.

Today, much of Morita's style and philosophy is maintained in the works of his student and Bokujinkai leader Sōsai Inada, who produces large-scale calligraphy works of a few characters with bold, expressive brushstrokes.

=== Process ===
Most Bokujinkai members still tend to work individually, but especially since the 1960s it has become typical to give public demonstrations of their work. For calligraphers who create works of a few characters written with an enormous brush, there is significant physical energy involved and the process can be dramatic and dynamic to witness. Inoue and Morita both allowed studio visits and gave demonstrations that were photographed and distributed widely in both Japanese and foreign press. Scenes of early Bokujinkai members at work were also captured by the artist Pierre Alechinsky in his 1957 short film, La calligraphie japonaise. Although Bokujinkai is less internationally prominent today, members continue to give public demonstrations at the group's annual meeting.

== Publications ==
Much of the development of Bokujinkai's philosophy, activities, and interests can be traced through the group's monthly journals edited by Morita. These publications featured a wide variety of material including exhibition reviews, research pieces, critical commentary, visual analysis, and roundtable debates and discussions. Publications sent abroad, primarily Bokubi, were printed with multilingual translations, primarily English and French, to aid in global outreach.

=== Bokubi ===
Bokubi was inaugurated by Morita in June 1951 prior to the formation of Bokujinkai. From the beginning, the periodical featured international artists and content, and its circulation was a major form of outreach and publicity for avant-garde calligraphy. In the early years of Bokujinkai, Bokubi was one of the most important tools in establishing contact with European and American artists and art circles, in part because the large number of calligraphy reproductions meant that non-Japanese speakers could learn about new works even without being able to read the accompanying articles. The content of Bokubi became more conservative in the 1960s, and publication ceased in 1981.

==== "Alpha-bu" ====
"Alpha-bu" (α部, “Alpha section”) was a groundbreaking column organized by Morita that was published in Bokubi from June 1950-February 1953. It featured reproductions of several calligraphy works, all of which eliminated moji-sei (文字性, essence of the written character). Morita invited the artist Saburō Hasegawa to evaluate contributions, and Hasegawa's written commentary was published alongside the contributions. The column was an experiment in finding and celebrating the “pure form” of calligraphy, with the idea that by focusing only on the formal qualities of ink and brush, the essence of calligraphy that needed to be maintained for the future would become apparent. However, the column only lasted a few years and despite being a noteworthy experiment, is seen by many calligraphers as a singular event rather than an influential collection of works.

=== Bokujin ===
Bokujin was established in 1952 as the dedicated journal of Bokujinkai. Unlike Bokubi, Bokujin was intended primarily as an internal journal for group members and supporters. It continues to fulfill this function for Bokujinkai today.

== Exhibitions ==
Bokujinkai has organized its own group exhibitions on a roughly annual basis since 1953, and continues to do so today. Since its establishment, the group has consciously chosen not to submit works to exhibitions juried by the calligraphy establishment. In the early years of the group Bokujinkai members instead showed their works at art exhibitions, including the exhibitions of the association Gendai Bijutsu Kondankai (現代美術懇談会, Contemporary Art Discussion Group, short: ゲンビ Genbi). Genbi's meetings also examined how the traditional arts of Japan might be modernized, and how they could achieve a degree of world relevance.

Until the early 1960s, group members also showed their works in prominent international venues. Bokujinkai members’ works were included in the exhibition Japanese Calligraphy at The Museum of Modern Art in New York in 1954. Morita and Hasegawa played a key organizational role in recommending works and artists for the exhibition. Bokujinkai members’ works were also featured at an exhibition at Musée Cernuschi in Paris in 1956, at Documenta in Kassel in 1959, and at the São Paulo Biennial in 1956, 1959, and 1961.

== Reception ==
In the 1950s, Bokujinkai works were discussed and reviewed extensively both in and out of Japan, largely due to the group's prominent exhibitions and the circulation of the periodical Bokubi.

=== In Japan ===
Bokujinkai calligraphers were at first readily accepted by the art world in Japan and engaged in frequent dialogue, collaboration, and exhibitions with prominent modern artists. Some leading figures in the Japanese art world ultimately felt that Bokujinkai was not radical or experimental enough, precisely because they continued to hold on to moji-sei (文字性, essence of the written character). This belief was expressed by the leader of Gutai, Jirō Yoshihara, as well as by the art critic Shūzō Takiguchi, who wrote in 1957 that Bokujinkai works were still preserving traditional standards for calligraphy. Yoshihara urged the group to discard moji-sei, but their decision to preserve it created distance between calligraphy and growing experimentation in avant-garde painting in Japan. Bokujinkai's advances were obscured by the more radical and flashy activities of other art groups, especially Gutai.

=== Outside Japan ===
In the 1950s, Bokujinkai members’ works received significant attention from American and European art critics. These critics analyzed avant-garde Japanese calligraphy primarily in relationship to postwar abstract painting. The 1954 Japanese Calligraphy exhibition at MoMA, for example, was covered by The Washington Post and Arts Digest, and in both reviews, parallels were made between the avant-garde calligraphic works and Abstract Expressionist paintings on view in New York.

Despite initial warm reception to Bokujinkai's international outreach, a critical backlash later developed, instigated in large part by the influential art critic Clement Greenberg. Greenberg criticized discussions in the U.S. art world that monochrome Abstract Expressionist painting was responding to Japanese calligraphy. In his essay “American Type Painting,” he stated “...none of the leading Abstract Expressionists except [Franz] Kline has shown more than a cursory interest in Oriental art, and it is easy to demonstrate that the roots of their art lie almost entirely within Western tradition.” This essay was representative of a growing tendency in the American art world to reject external influences, and contributed to a weakening enthusiasm for Bokujinkai in Western artistic circles. This nationalistic stance in turn also contributed to Bokujinkai's eventual retreat from international activity.
