= Harry Bowden =

American painter

- Harry Bowden seated next to a painting., ca. 1940
- Born: Harry Clinton Bowden; February 9, 1907; Los Angeles
- Died: January 16, 1965 (aged 57); Sausalito, California
- Spouse: F. Lois Bowden

Harry Bowden (1907–1965) was an abstract painter who lived and worked both in New York and California. He showed in both group and solo exhibitions in Manhattan and San Francisco and was a founding member of American Abstract Artists. He is known both for fully abstract and for representative works, but the latter predominate. He once said a painter should embrace many ideas, symbols, forms, tones, and colors and through metamorphosis make them into a new thing — a painting having a life of its own. Having taken up photography as a mid-career hobby, he became as well known for his photographs as for his easel works.

== Early life and training ==
Bowden was born in Los Angeles in 1907. At the age of 20 he studied at the Otis Art Institute and also privately under J. Francis Smith. (Note: Some sources name the school as the Los Angeles Art Institute. This presumably refers to the Los Angeles County Art Institute. The Otis Art Institute assumed that name in 1954. When it opened in 1916, the institute was called the Otis Art Institute of the Los Angeles Museum of History, Science, and Art, or Otis Art Institute for short. In 1961 it became the Otis Art Institute of Los Angeles County and in 1978, when the county dropped its support, it became the Otis Art Institute of Parsons School of Design. When Parsons dropped its support it became the Otis School of Art and Design and it is now called the Otis College of Art and Design.)

In 1927 or 1928 he traveled to New York and took a room in a boarding house in the Lincoln Square neighborhood of Manhattan, an area that had been dubbed a "New Bohemia" when aspiring artists, writers, and practitioners of the performing arts congregated there during the first two decades of the 20th century. During 1928 and 1929 he studied at the National Academy of Design and the Art Students League.

Bowden subsequently returned to Los Angeles and took a job in an advertising agency. In 1931 a summer class that was taught by Hans Hofmann at the University of California, Berkeley, helped him to resolve his uncertainty about becoming a professional artist. In 1932 he enrolled in the Chouinard Art Institute in Los Angeles and that same year he was given a solo exhibition at the Paul Elder Gallery in San Francisco.

== Career in art ==
"An artist who only portrays a geometric arrangement of colored forms he has in mind, contributes nothing more than the artist who tries to copy nature. They show us the possibilities of a painting, but do not fulfill the promise.

— Statement in the catalog for an exhibition featuring Harry Bowden, George McNeil, and Albert Swinden at the New School for Social Research, 1940.

In 1934 Bowden moved back to New York to resume study under Hofmann. In September he participated in a group show at the Contemporary Arts Gallery. (Note: New York's Contemporary Arts Gallery opened in 1929. Led by Emily Francis, it aimed to "bring before the public the work of the mature artist regardless of his financial, social, or racial condition." It was the first gallery to show work by Mark Tobey, Mark Rothko, Louis Schanker, Stanley Twardowicz, and other notable artists.) The following year he became a studio assistant in the School of Fine Arts that Hofmann was then directing on East 57th Street in Manhattan's gallery district. He also joined the recently established Federal Art Project and began receiving payment for murals he painted as a federal employee. One early commission brought Bowden together with six fellow artists as assistants to Fernand Léger in a project to create murals for the French Line terminal in Manhattan. (Note: The six other artists were Byron Browne, George McNeil, Willem de Kooning, Balcomb Greene, Mercedes Matter, and José de Rivera.) The murals never got beyond the concept stage, however, as the project was canceled a few weeks after it began. In 1937 and 1938 Bowden made two murals for a low-income housing development called Williamsburg Houses in Brooklyn. (Note: In this project he was part of a group that included three of the French Line artists (Browne, McNeil, and de Kooning) plus Jan Matulka and Eugene Morley.)

In 1936 he was one of 30 founding members of American Abstract Artists, a nonprofit organization set up to promote abstract art and, through exhibitions, provide means for artist members to show their work to prospective buyers. After joining, he showed frequently in the organization's exhibitions. The same year he also began participating in group shows by two similar organizations: Salons of America and Artists Gallery. He showed once in a Salon exhibition (1936) and many times in exhibitions held at Artists Gallery. (Note: Founded by Hamilton Easter Field, Salons of America put on exhibitions having "no prizes, no juries" and took steps to assure that no artist would be given prominence over another. Artists Gallery was supported by donations and charged no fees on artists' sales.) During the late 1930s and early 1940s he also showed at the Reinhardt Gallery, the Egan Gallery, and the New School for Social Research in Manhattan. Early solo exhibitions included a 1936 show at the 8th Street Playhouse in Greenwich Village and a 1938 show at the Artists Gallery. In 1941 he was given a second solo exhibition at the Artists Gallery.

In about 1940 Bowden took up photography as a relaxing way to recover from the intensity of a session of painting. He later said he would spend his afternoons with his camera after mornings at his easel. During the 1950s he was considered to be a professional in both painting and photography and his photographs are now held in the permanent collections of museums such as New York's Museum of Modern Art.

In 1942 Bowden moved to Sausalito, California and took wartime work as a shipfitter. At the end of the war he began to spend some months of the year in New York while continuing to live in California.

In 1945 and 1950 Bowden participated in annual exhibitions at the San Francisco Art Association and he continued to exhibit in San Francisco museums and galleries throughout the 1950s. In 1947 he also began what became a regular habit of showing work at the Sausalito Library. That year he also received an award for a painting of Sausalito harbor called "Old Town in the Cove" and in 1949 received an award for one of his photos.

In 1948 he taught color, anatomy, and figure drawing at the California School of Fine Arts. A year later he moved from Sausalito to nearby Marin City. In March 1955 he showed oils in a solo exhibition at the East and West Gallery in San Francisco and in August he showed photographs in a solo exhibition at the California Palace of the Legion of Honor.

After he moved to California, Bowden periodically returned to New York to visit friends and do business with gallery owners, but retained his permanent home in Marin City until his death in 1965.

=== Artistic style and critical reception ===
Harry Bowden, Abstract Composition, Yellow Background, 1937, watercolor and gouache, 8 1/2 x 7 inches

Harry Bowden, Plant on Table, about 1936, gouache, 12 x 9 inches

Harry Bowden, Fernand Legér, graphite, 16 1/2 x 14 inches

Harry Bowden, Street Children, Mexico, 1941, gelatin silver print, 9 3/4 x 7 3/4 inches

Bowden worked in oil, gouache, graphite, watercolor, and mixed media. Most pieces are small enough to have been made on an easel. In the 1930s he studied Cubist painters and his style then showed some Cubist influence. In this period he made both representational and non-representational works. Writing in 1941, a critic noted that he had by then outgrown his tendency toward pure abstraction. Two years later, another critic praised this turn toward semi-abstraction. The exhibition catalog for a 1940 show in which Bowden participated has a statement expressing his point of view. It says, "A painting embraces many ideas, symbols, forms, tones, and colors, but all are resolved into a new thing. The metamorphosis makes the painting real — gives it a life of its own." In 1947 Ad Reinhardt wrote a brief instruction on appreciating abstract art in which he said: "Like in much modern painting, we see in the work of de Kooning and Bowden what may seem to be a 'sketchiness' and 'unfinishedness' which not only shows the actual process of creation but asks the onlooker to 'complete' and 'finish' the painting in the looking-act." In a 1955 interview, Bowden said a viewer should not focus on the subject of the painting. "The main thing is concept," he said. "As in music you play a theme around the subject."

Bowden's abstract composition with yellow background (1937), shown at left, is an example of his pure abstractionist style. His "Plant On Table" (1936), shown at right is an example of his semi-abstractionist style. The sketch of Fernand Legér (1936), shown at right, is an example of his drawing technique. The photo of street children in Mexico (1941), shown at right, is an example of his photography.

As a photographer, Bowden took many shots of New York painters who were his friends, including Willem de Kooning (1946, 1951), Ad Reinhardt (1959), Jackson Pollock, and Lee Krasner (1949). He also made photographic portraits of Edward Weston (1951), Imogene Cunningham (1955), and other men and women prominent in the arts. His photographs taken out-of-doors feature nudes in beach or desert scenes, as well as city scenes and landscapes. He rarely or never worked in color and his half-tone work tended to draw out textures and patterns and take advantage of the play of light.

== Personal life and family ==
Bowden was born on February 9, 1907, in Los Angeles, California. His birth name was Harry Clinton Bowden. Although he did not refer to himself as Harry Clinton Jr., he and his father bore the same name. Harry Clinton Bowden (senior) was born June 17, 1879, in Providence, Rhode Island and died January 20, 1963, in Los Angeles. He earned his living as a self employed die maker for a manufacturer of fruit packing equipment. Bowden's mother was Sina H. Bowden, born in Kansas about 1889. Bowden had a brother, Dale C. Bowden (born about 1913). Bowden was married to a woman whose given name was Lois and who was known as Lois Bowden. The memorial plaque for Bowden and her shows her name as "F. Lois."
