= Morita Shiryū =

Japanese artist

Ryu chi Ryu (Dragon Knows Dragon) by Morita Shiryū

Morita Shiryū (June 24, 1912 – December 1, 1998) was a postwar Japanese artist who revolutionized Japanese calligraphy into a global avant-garde aesthetic.

He was born in Toyooka, Hyōgo, Japan with the name Morita Kiyoshi (森田清). About 1925, he adopted the art name Morita Shiryū (森田子龍). "Shiryū" (子龍) translates a "dragon child". Around 1937, he moved to Tokyo to study calligraphy under Ueda Sōkyū (上田桑鳩). In 1943, he returned home, and five years later, he moved to Kyoto City to immerse himself in its art community.

He was a founding member of the Bokujinkai ('Group of People of the Ink'), an association of calligraphy artists who envisioned to bring the art of calligraphy to the position of international prominence. He edited the monthly journal Bokubi (墨美, Beauty of Ink) from 1951 to 1981. He participated in meetings and exhibitions of the cross-genre study and discussion group Gendai Bijutsu Kondankai (現代美術懇談会, Contemporary Art Discussion Group, short: ゲンビ Genbi). While at the Bokujinkai, Morita launched artistic and intellectual exchange with many prominent international abstract artists including Franz Kline, Pierre Soulages, Pierre Alechinsky, and Walasse Ting.

Ryu chi Ryu (Dragon Knows Dragon) from 1964 is an example of Morita's large scale (42.8 x 86 inch) calligraphic paintings that incorporate unusual materials (aluminum flake pigment in polyvinyl acetate medium, yellow alkyd varnish on paper), and are devoid of textural meaning.
