= Swing Landscape =

1938 modernist mural

- Artist: Stuart Davis
- Year: 1938
- Medium: Oil on canvas
- Dimensions: (86 3/4 in × 173 1/8 in)
- Location: Eskenazi Museum of Art

The Swing Landscape is a modernist mural by the American painter Stuart Davis, painted in 1938 and on permanent display in the Eskenazi Museum of Art at Indiana University, Bloomington, IN, USA [Accession #42.1]. It is considered one of the most important American paintings in the 20th-century.

== History ==
The Works Progress Administration commissioned a mural for its Williamsburg Housing Project in Brooklyn, New York, from Davis in 1937. After completing a study of the mural in 1938 (currently held by the National Gallery of Art), Davis spent a year completing the full mural. However, it was never installed for reasons unknown. Davis drew on the sketches he made in the 1930s of docks, piers, and fishing schooners in Gloucester, Massachusetts.
