= Herman Rose =

American artist (1909–2007)

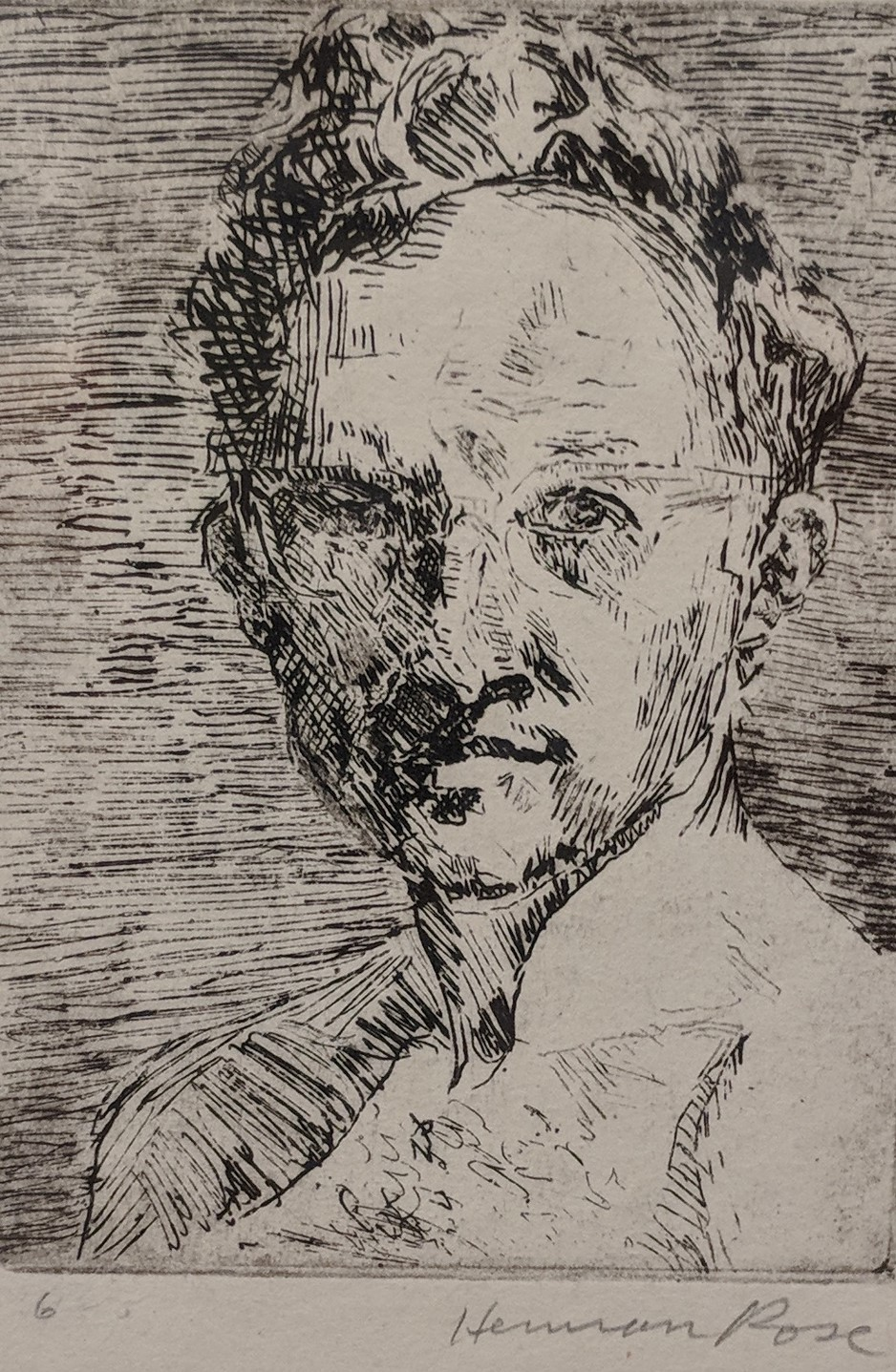
- Self portrait
- Born: Herman Rappaport; 6 November 1909; Brooklyn, NY
- Died: 4 December 2007 (aged 98); New York, NY
- Education: National Academy of Design
- Known for: cityscapes, still life
- Style: Impressionistic
- Spouse(s): Tilly Rappaport, Elia Braca Rose
- Awards: 1972 American Academy and Institute of Arts and Letters, Award National Academy of Arts
- Patrons: Arshile Gorky, Hilton Kramer, Lawrence Campbell
- Website: www.hermanrose.com

Herman Rose was the professional pseudonym of Herman Rappaport (November 6, 1909 – December 4, 2007), an American painter and artist. He was best known for his depictions of cityscapes, including his painting "74th Street Rooftops From Studio."

== Early life ==
Herman Rappaport was born in Brooklyn, New York. in 1909. Originally trained as a draftsman and studied at the National Academy of Design from 1927 to 1929, he was later employed by the Works Progress Administration's Murals Division under Arshile Gorky from 1934 until 1939. In 1939, after experimenting with a variety of contemporary expressionistic styles, Rose decided to paint from life. Working mostly in East New York and East Canarsie in Brooklyn, and in Manhattan, Rose began to paint roof tops and street scenes.

== Painting ==
Rappaport began using the name Herman Rose when he held his first solo art exhibition in 1946 at the Charles Egan Gallery in New York City. Although he initially began as an Expressionistic painter, he became known for small, light-filled Impressionist paintings of still life, cityscapes and skies by the early 1950s. His paintings and images were often composed of very small dabs of paint and tiny, blurry "squares," which combined to create the image on canvas, his favorite medium. Often described as a "lyrical painter" Rose's work "interpreted traditional subjects: landscape, still life and the figure....like the Post-Impressionists from whom he developed his own style, Rose built up forms from distinct touches of color that don't entirely blend in the viewer's eye. This gives his surfaces an active quality that flattens forms, one of the great lessons of modernism."

Herman Rose's work received official recognition when Ms. Dorothy Miller of Museum of Modern Art (MoMA) included his work in an exhibition called, "15 Americans," alongside work by Clyfford Still, Mark Rothko and Jackson Pollock.

New York Times art critic Hilton Kramer wrote of Rose's work in 1981, "{he} must surely be counted among the most beautiful works anyone has produced in this challenging medium for many years." The Art in America art critic Lawrence Campbell wrote of his work in 1990, "Herman Rose, who is, in my opinion, the greatest living painter of landscape and still life in the U.S., has never for a moment abandoned the practice of painting from direct observation. ... Yet when Rose looks at anything, he seems able to participate with his entire being in the scene 'out there,' seeing beyond the relationships of space, distance and comparative size, or even of reflected light. It is this intensity of perception that becomes the true subject of his painting, rather than the subject itself as it is seen by others."

Over the next forty years Rose's works were featured in over 20 separate solo art exhibitions, including a group show, at the Louis Stern Gallery in Beverly Hills, CA which featured Marc Chagall, Henri Fantin-Latour, Alberto Giacometti, Robert Maplethorpe, Henri Matisse, Edwin Dickinson, Georgia O'Keeffe and Pablo Picasso. His last solo exhibition took place at the Mercury Gallery in 2007. His work is in the collections of several major museums including the Hirshhorn Museum and Sculpture Garden, the Museum of Modern Art, the Whitney Museum of American Art, the Smithsonian Institution, and the National Academy of Design.

Rose also worked as an art teacher and professor. He taught at Brooklyn College from 1949 until 1951. He held additionally posts at Hofstra University, Pratt Institute and Queens College before taking a teaching position at The New School from 1963 until his retirement in 1990.

== Death ==
Herman Rose died of cancer at the age of 98 at Westbeth Artists Community, his home in New York City. He was survived by his wife, Elia Braca Rose, and his two sons from his first marriage (which ended in divorce), George Rappaport and Andrew Rose.
