= 14832 Alechinsky =

Asteroid

Discovery
- Discovered by: E. W. Elst
- Discovery site: La Silla Obs.
- Discovery date: 27 August 1987

Designations
- Named after: Pierre Alechinsky (Belgian painter)
- Alternative designations: 1987 QC_{3} · 1994 PY_{32}
- Minor planet category: main-belt · (inner); Vesta

Orbital characteristics
- Epoch 23 March 2018 (JD 2458200.5)
- Uncertainty parameter 0
- Observation arc: 30.76 yr (11,234 d)
- Aphelion: 2.5765 AU
- Perihelion: 2.0088 AU
- Semi-major axis: 2.2926 AU
- Eccentricity: 0.1238
- Orbital period (sidereal): 3.47 yr (1,268 d)
- Mean anomaly: 247.16°
- Mean motion: 0° 17^{m} 2.04^{s} / day
- Inclination: 5.7284°
- Longitude of ascending node: 307.39°
- Argument of perihelion: 78.201°

Physical characteristics
- Mean diameter: 3.92 km (calculated); 4.359±0.176 km
- Synodic rotation period: 8.07±0.02 h
- Geometric albedo: 0.194±0.016; 0.24 (assumed)
- Spectral type: S (assumed)
- Absolute magnitude (H): 14.2; 14.462±0.010 (R)

14832 Alechinsky (provisional designation 1987 QC_{3}) is a Vestian asteroid from the inner regions of the asteroid belt, approximately 4 kilometers (2.5 miles) in diameter. It was discovered on 27 August 1987, by Belgian astronomer Eric Elst at ESO's La Silla Observatory site in northern Chile. The highly elongated asteroid has a rotation period of 8.1 hours. It was named after Belgian painter Pierre Alechinsky.

== Orbit and classification ==
Alechinsky is a member of the Vesta family. Vestian asteroids have a composition akin to cumulate eucrites (HED meteorites) and are thought to have originated deep within 4 Vesta's crust, possibly from the Rheasilvia crater, a large impact crater on its southern hemisphere near the South pole, formed as a result of a subcatastrophic collision. It orbits the Sun in the inner main-belt at a distance of 2.0–2.6 AU once every 3 years and 6 months (1,268 days; semi-major axis of 2.29 AU). Its orbit has an eccentricity of 0.12 and an inclination of 6° with respect to the ecliptic. The asteroid's observation arc begins in 1987, as no precoveries had been taken prior to its discovery.

== Naming ==
This minor planet was named in honor of Belgian painter and internationally prominent 20th century artist, Pierre Alechinsky (born 1927), known for his treatment of colors, versatility and graphic humor. He was a member of the expressionist art group and avant-garde movement CoBrA, a name which was coined from the initials of the members' home cities: Copenhagen, Brussels, and Amsterdam. The approved naming citation was published by the Minor Planet Center on 13 October 2000 (M.P.C. 41387).

== Physical characteristics ==
=== Diameter and albedo ===
According to the survey carried out by the NEOWISE mission of NASA's space-based Wide-field Infrared Survey Explorer, Alechinsky measures 4.4 kilometers in diameter and its surface has an albedo of 0.194, while the Collaborative Asteroid Lightcurve Link assumes an albedo of 0.24 – which derives from 8 Flora, the largest member and namesake of this orbital family – and calculates a diameter of 3.9 kilometers with an absolute magnitude of 14.2.

=== Rotation period ===
In February 2013, two rotational lightcurves of Alechinsky were obtained from photometric observations in the R-band by astronomers at the Palomar Transient Factory, California. Lightcurve analysis gave a rotation period of 8.07±0.02 and 9.5831±0.1453 hours, with a brightness variation of 0.98 and 1.30 in magnitude, respectively (U=2+/2). Such an exceptionally high amplitude in magnitude indicates that the body has a very elongated shape.
