= Charles Egan Gallery =

Art gallery in New York City

Coordinates: 40.76192°N 73.97146°W

The Charles Egan Gallery opened at 63 East 57th Street (Manhattan) in about 1945–1946, when Charles Egan (1914 - 1993) was in his early 30s. Egan's artists helped him fix up the gallery: "Isamu Noguchi did the lighting... Willem de Kooning and Franz Kline painted the walls."

A group show the next year included works by de Kooning, Joseph Stella, Josef Albers, Mark Rothko, Paul Klee and Georges Braque.

== Timeline ==
In 1948, Charles Egan Gallery held a solo exhibition of de Kooning's black and white paintings. Irving Sandler wrote that because of this exhibition, "de Kooning was established as a major Abstract Expressionist ... soon to be the most influential artist of his generation."

In 1949 Joseph Cornell had his first show at the Charles Egan Gallery.

In 1950, Robert De Niro, Sr. had his first show at the Egan Gallery, where he continued to show until 1955.

In 1952 George McNeil had his first show at the Egan Gallery, and subsequent solo shows in 1953 and 1954, and where he continued to show until the mid-1950s.

In 1954 Knox Martin had his first one-man show at the Charles Egan Gallery.

Among the artists Mr. Egan showed were Louise Bourgeois, Harry Bowden, Robert De Niro, Sr., George McNeil, Elias Goldberg, Peter Golfinopoulos, Philip Guston, Raoul Hague, Julius Hatofsky, Franz Kline, Noguchi, Reuben Nakian, Robert Rauschenberg, Aaron Siskind, Jack Tworkov, and Esteban Vicente.

The gallery moved to the Fuller Building at 41 East 57th Street in New York City during the 1950s and closed in 1972.

== Books ==
- Mark Stevens, Annalyn Swan, "De Kooning : an American master," (New York: A.A. Knopf, 2004.)
