= Walasse Ting =

American painter

- Born: 丁雄泉; 13 October 1928; Wuxi, China
- Died: 17 May 2010 (aged 81); New York City, US
- Years active: 1952–2002
- Known for: Painting
- Awards: Guggenheim Fellowship Award for Drawing, 1970

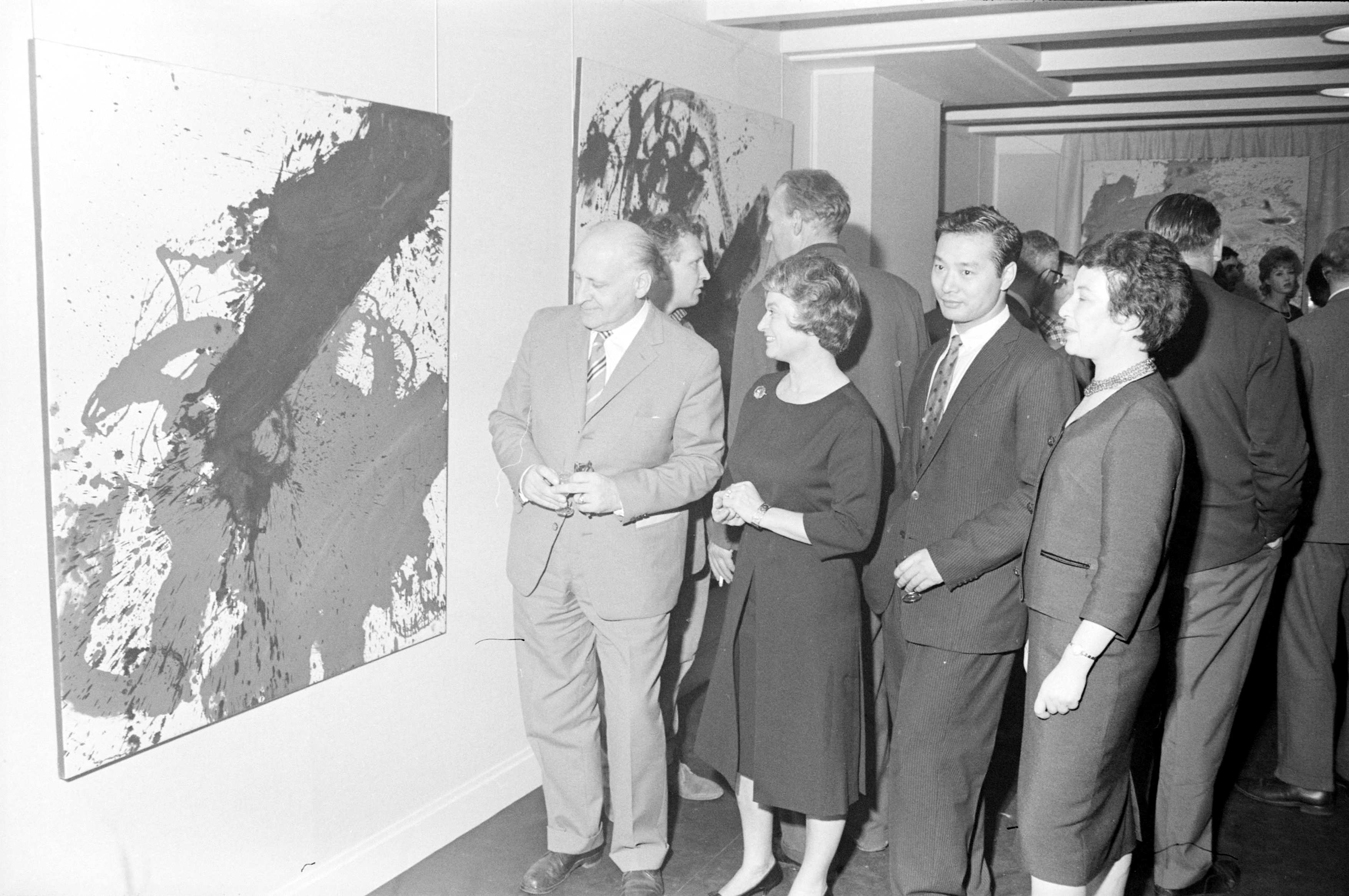
Walasse Ting with solo expo in Gallery Espace in Amsterdam, 1960

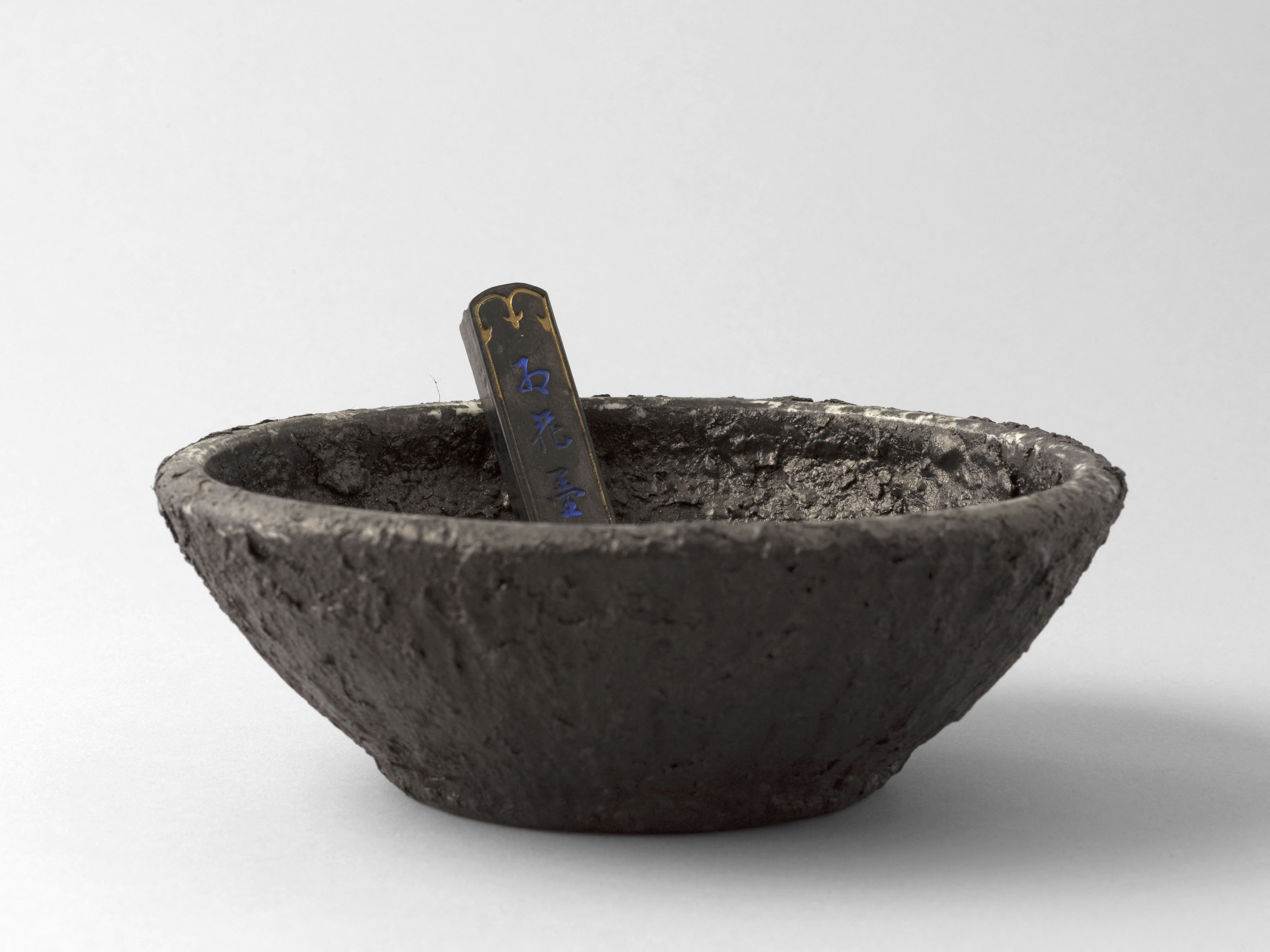
Bowl covered with ink used by the artist for 20 years with half-used ink stick. Musée Cernuschi

Walasse Ting (Chinese: 丁雄泉, 13 October 1928 – 17 May 2010) was a Chinese-American visual artist and poet. His colorful paintings have attracted critical admiration and a popular following. Common subjects include nude women and cats, birds and other animals.

== Background ==
He was born on 13 October 1928 in Wuxi, China. The youngest of four sons of Ting Ho Ching and Ying Ping Si, who owned and managed factories that made boxes and other things. He briefly studied art at Shanghai College of Fine Arts. In 1951, he moved to Hong Kong, then settled in Paris shortly thereafter.

== Career ==
Ting started his career as an artist in Paris in the 1950s. There, he associated with artists such as Karel Appel, Asger Jorn, and Pierre Alechinsky, members of the avant-garde group CoBrA. In 1957, he moved to the United States, and settled in New York where his work was influenced by pop art and abstract expressionism. He began primarily as an abstract artist, but the bulk of his work since the mid-1970s has been described as popular figuratism, with broad areas of color painted with a Chinese brush and acrylic paint.

He is perhaps best known for his series of paintings featuring women, which he called "Cat Women." These works often featured female figures surrounded by flowers and other decorative elements. Ting was also known for his collaborations with poets, including Allen Ginsberg and Gary Snyder, and his own poetry, which often featured themes of love and desire.

He lived in Amsterdam in the 1990s, but regularly moved between there and New York. He is the author of 13 books, including "All in my Head" (Walasse Ting & Roland Topor, 1974) and "One Cent Life" (Eberhard W. Kornfeld, 1964) a portfolio of 62 original lithographs by 28 artists, including Andy Warhol, Roy Lichtenstein, Kiki Kogelnik, Tom Wesselmann, James Rosenquist, Asger Jorn, Pierre Alechinsky, Karel Appel, Claes Oldenburg, Joan Mitchell, Robert Rauschenberg and Sam Francis.

He won the Guggenheim Fellowship Award (for Drawing) in 1970. In 1990 Louis Stern presented an exhibition of recent works on rice paper in his Beverly Hills gallery. His works are found in the permanent collections of many museums worldwide, including the Guggenheim Museum, New York; Museum of Modern Art, New York; Art Institute of Chicago; the National Gallery of Art, Washington, DC;Tate Modern, London; Centre Pompidou, Paris and the Hong Kong Museum of Art, among others. He was sometimes referred to by his Chinese name "丁雄泉" or its various romanizations: Ding Xiongquan or Ting Hsiung-ch'uan.

In the 1970s, his color and female-themed style gradually formed, and his works integrated the spirit of eastern and western painting performances, which reached their peak in the 1980s. In 1970, Ding won a painting grant from the Guggenheim Memorial Foundation, and his works are stored in many world-class art galleries.

In the mid-1980s, he set up a studio in Amsterdam, the Netherlands, and in 2001 he permanently settled in that city. He was unable to create after a stroke in 2002.

== Personal life and death ==
In 1962, Ting married artist Natalie Lipton (d. 1983); they had two children and lived in the Westbeth Artists Community. Ting died from a cerebral hemorrhage at a care facility in Manhattan on 17 May 2010, at age 81.
