= Peter Golfinopoulos =

American artist (1928–2024)

- Born: August 3, 1928; New York City, U.S.
- Died: February 2, 2024 (aged 95)
- Education: Columbia University; Art Students League
- Known for: Painting

Peter Golfinopoulos (August 3, 1928 – February 2, 2024) was an American artist. His paintings are marked by a variety of highly individualistic modes.

== Life and career ==
Golfinopoulos was born in New York City on August 3, 1928. He served for three years in the U.S. Air Force.

Art Students League of New York, 1950–1951. Studied with Edwin Dickinson and George Grosz.

Columbia University, BFA (1956) and MFA (1958). Golfinopoulos’s main interests were philosophy and art history. He pursued graduate work in philosophy with Robert Denoon Cumming and Albert Hofstadter and studied extensively with art historian Meyer Schapiro. After leaving Columbia, Golfinopoulos remained in contact with Schapiro, and their conversations were influential to his development.

After earning his MFA, in 1958, Golfinopoulos had his first one-man show at Collette Roberts’ Grand Central Moderns Gallery, and began teaching part-time at Columbia’s School of Fine Arts. Offered tenure in 1968, feeling that the increase in hours and responsibility would interfere with painting, he decided to leave. Later, he accepted an offer from Stuart Klonis, then head of the Art Students League, to teach one afternoon per week. He maintained this commitment, seeing it as an ethical imperative.

In 1963, Golfinopoulos met Charles Egan of the Charles Egan Gallery, who became his dealer and his friend. In Egan he found someone whose connection to history, and whose understanding and respect for art, made him an ideal guide for a young artist. Through Egan he met art historian H. H. Arnason and art critic Harris Rosenstein, whose aesthetic convictions and ongoing conversations provided additional grounding and moral support. His friendship with Egan continued after the gallery closed in 1972.

Golfinopoulos was married to Anna Urban, a noted yoga instructor. He died on February 2, 2024, at the age of 95.

== Work ==
The early paintings, 1958 to 1964, are intimate Cartesian dreams. From 1964 to 1971, involvement with Joycean myth brought imaginative, outgoing, precisely measured, and strikingly large abstract narrative constructions. Still working in the non-representational vocabulary of abstraction, there was a shift in the early 1970s to loose, open, emotionally charged dramatic confrontations.

The years 1985 to 1995 produced “Comic Allegories,” a group of non-naturalistic narrative paintings provoked by changing situations in the world. They represent the artist’s only excursion into figuration. “Charms,” completed in 2005, are paintings of sensual order. They mark a break with narrative as a generative impulse and a return to a smaller, more intimate format.

His later works are colorful speculations in and on idleness.

== Museum collections ==
- Hirshhorn Museum, Washington, D.C.
- Corcoran Gallery, Washington, D.C.
- Brooklyn Museum of Art
- Institute of Contemporary Art, Boston
- Columbus Museum of Art, Columbus, Ohio
- Cornell University, Ithaca, New York
- Herbert F. Johnson Museum of Art
- University of Iowa Museum of Art (housed at the Figge Art Museum)
- Rhode Island School of Design

Golfinopoulos’s works are in numerous private and corporate collections.
