= Julius Hatofsky =

American painter

- Born: April 1, 1922; Ellenville, New York
- Died: January 1, 2006 (aged 83); Vallejo, California, United States
- Known for: Painting
- Movement: Abstract expressionism, American Figurative Expressionism

Julius Hatofsky (April 1, 1922 – January 1, 2006) was an American painter.

== Biography ==
Julius Hatofsky was born in Ellenville, in upstate New York, in 1922, and first studied art as a teenager in the Works Progress Administration/Federal Art Project (WPA/FAP) art classes. Later he studied at the Art Students League of New York (1946–1950) and the Académie de la Grande Chaumière in Paris (1950–1951), returning to New York to study at the Hans Hofmann School in 1952. At the League he studied with Morris Kantor and Robert Beverly Hale.

Hatofsky had a varied experience beyond the art world. While still a young man he worked as a New York City police officer. Later, in 1942 in World War II, he was drafted into the 82nd Airborne Division, landing by glider in crucial battles. A foot soldier later promoted to sergeant, he served in the Battle of the Bulge and the invasions of the Netherlands and Normandy; later in 1945 he participated in the liberation of a concentration camp.

Julius Hatofsky began painting in New York during the 1950s and moved to San Francisco in 1961 to teach at the San Francisco Art Institute, eventually retiring in 1995. According to the critic from Art in America magazine,

”During the 1960s, he worked in a Bay Area Abstract Expressionist mode, creating sumptuous, almost iridescent surfaces animated by streams of sinuous energy.”

after 1973, his paintings gradually moved toward American Figurative Expressionism.

”These works often feature obscure, scurrying phantoms painted in a frothy multihued and multilayered oil impasto…Hatofsky’s paintings are sensually generous and richly nuanced.”

Julius Hatofsky

”for 33 years taught painting and figure drawing to generations of aspiring artists at the San Francisco Art Institute. He befriended many, treating them to a round of drinks and a good cigar at the pub, and inviting hundreds at a time to standing-room-only parties at his 5,600-square-foot SoMa loft. He rented the loft for decades, until the dot-com boom of the mid-1990s pushed him and his wife to a Victorian house in remote Vallejo, the nearest town to San Francisco where he could afford to buy a house.”

Close to his death Hatofsky wrote:

"..Inventing imagery is the basis of my painting. Once involved, I concentrate on scale, inner light, drawing, surface, rhythm, color. Developing these painting concerns has helped to focus my emotional intensity and release my imagination. At age 83, I have a range and variety of expression and imagery and feel a command over the work that has taken over sixty years to acquire. I constantly try to reach deeper, to move beyond my limitations, to challenge myself and to learn. I feel I’ve made considerable progress in the last 25 years.”

Julius Hatofsky died on January 1, 2006, in Vallejo, California.

== Selected solo exhibitions ==
- 1958: Avant-Garde Gallery, New York, NY;
- 1959: Holland Goldowsky Gallery, Chicago, IL;
- 1961, 63: Charles Egan Gallery, New York City;
- 1965, 66: Marylhurst College, Portland, OR;
- 1967: Spencer Museum of Art, University of Kansas, Lawrence, KS;
- 1968: Emmanuel Walter Collection, San Francisco Art Institute, San Francisco, CA;
- 1974: Smith-Anderson Gallery, Palo Alto, CA;
- 1975: Smith-Anderson Gallery, San Francisco, CA;
- 1983, 85: Paule Anglim Gallery, San Francisco, CA;
- 1987, 89: Pier 23 Gallery, San Francisco, CA;
- 1988: Museum of Modern Art Rental Gallery, San Francisco, CA;
- 1993: Monterey Museum of Art, Monterey, CA;
- 1994–1996: D.P.Fong Galleries, San Jose, CA;
- 2000: Painting and Drawing, Fresno Art Museum, Fresno, CA;
- 2003: Drawings, Carl Cherry Center for the Arts, Carmel, CA;
- 2005: Painting and Drawing, Triton Museum of Art, Santa Clara, CA;
- 2008: Paintings, The Bank of America, San Francisco, CA.

== Selected group exhibitions ==
- 1958: Newark Museum Biennial, Newark, New Jersey;
- 1959: Whitney Museum of American Art, Annual. New York, NY;
- 1968: University of Texas, Austin, Texas;
- 1977:San Francisco Museum of Modern Art, San Francisco, California;
- 1978: Kansas City Art Institute, Kansas City, Missouri;
- 1979: Smith-Anderson Gallery, Palo Alto, CA;
- 1987: Mira Godard Gallery, Toronto, Canada; Jack Gallery, New York, NY;
- 1995: Museum of Modern Art Rental Gallery, San Francisco;
- 1994–1996: Still Working, circ., United States.

== Works in permanent collections ==
- Whitney Museum of American Art, New York, NY
- Neuberger Museum of Art, Purchase, New York
- Kalamazoo Valley Museum, Kalamazoo, Michigan
- Telfair Museum of Art, Savannah, Georgia
- High Museum of Art, Atlanta, Georgia
- Numerous private collection

== See also ==
- Art movement
- Abstract expressionism
- New York School
- Action painting
- Expressionism
