= Stuart Davis (painter) =

American painter (1892–1964)

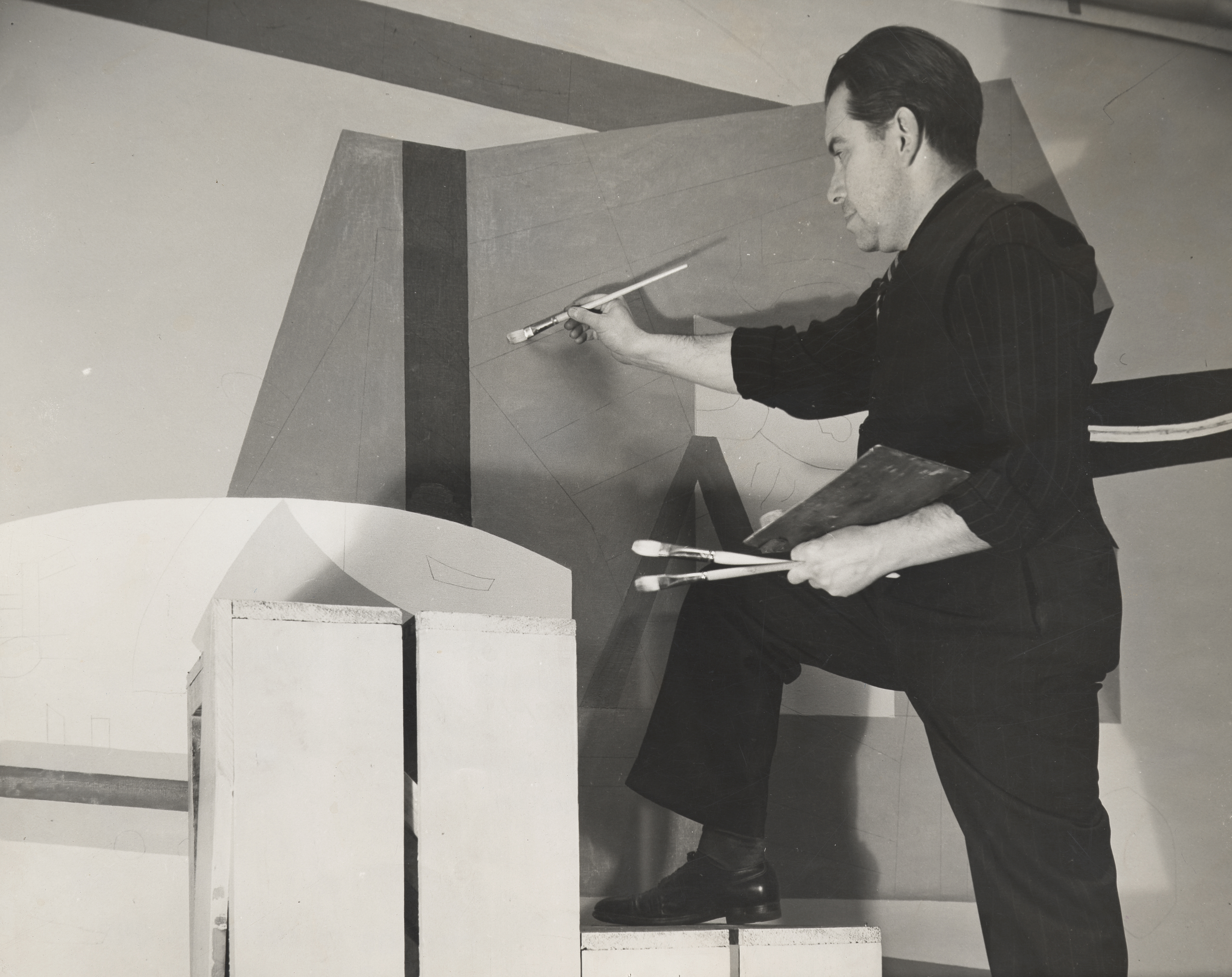
- Davis at work, 1939
- Born: Edward Stuart Davis; December 7, 1892; Philadelphia, Pennsylvania, US
- Died: June 24, 1964 (aged 71); New York City, US
- Movement: American modernism

Edward Stuart Davis (December 7, 1892 – June 24, 1964) was an American modernist painter. He was associated with early twentieth-century American modernism, including the Ashcan School, and later developed a style characterized by bold color, jazz references, and urban subject matter. In the 1930s, Davis became politically active and participated in federally sponsored art programs during the Great Depression.

== Early life and education ==
Davis was born Edward Stuart Davis on December 7, 1892, in Philadelphia to Edward Wyatt Davis, art editor of The Philadelphia Press, and Helen Stuart Davis, sculptor. In 1909 he entered the Orange High School, but during his first year he dropped out and began commuting to New York City. Davis began his formal art training under Robert Henri, the leader of the Ashcan School, at the Robert Henri School of Art in New York in 1912. During this time, Davis befriended painters John Sloan, Glenn Coleman and Henry Glintenkamp.

In 1913, Davis was one of the youngest painters to exhibit in the Armory Show, where he displayed five watercolor paintings in the Ashcan school style. In the show, Davis was exposed to the works of a number of artists including Vincent van Gogh, Henri Matisse, and Pablo Picasso. Following the Armory Show, Davis increasingly engaged with modernist styles, including cubism. He spent summers painting in Gloucester, Massachusetts, and made painting trips to Havana in 1918 and New Mexico in 1923.

== Career ==
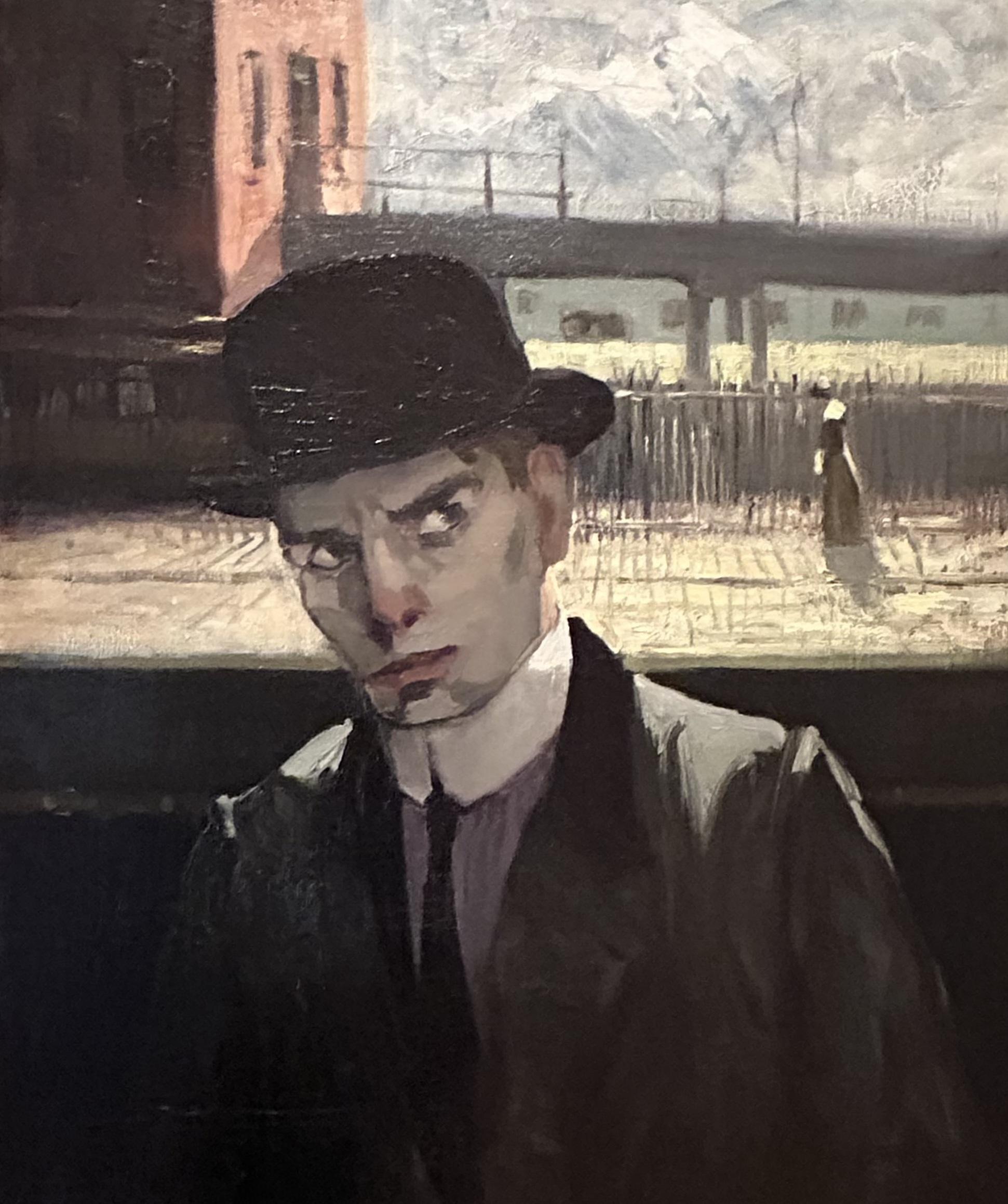
Self-Portrait, 1912

After studying with Robert Henri beginning in 1909, Davis developed within the circle of artists associated with the Ashcan School. Henri’s emphasis on direct observation and rejection of academic conventions influenced Davis’s early work and encouraged his engagement with everyday urban subject matter. Following the 1913 Armory Show, Davis increasingly adopted modernist approaches. By 1919, works such as Self-Portrait (Amon Carter Museum of American Art) reflected his movement toward a more individualized style. During the 1920s, he developed a mature aesthetic characterized by abstracted still lifes and landscapes. His use of commercial imagery, including cigarette packages and advertisements, has been cited as anticipating later developments in Pop art.

In the 1930s, he became more politically active. According to Cécile Whiting, he sought to "reconcile abstract art with Marxism and modern industrial society". He joined the Artists' Union in 1934 and later served as its president. In 1936, he was elected National Secretary of the American Artists' Congress. During this period, he completed mural commissions for the Federal Art Project of the Works Progress Administration.

In 1932, Davis executed a mural for Radio City Music Hall, later titled "Men Without Women" by the Rockefeller Center Art Committee. According to Hilton Kramer in a 1975 piece on the work in the New York Times, Davis was happy neither with the location in which the mural was placed nor with the title it was given. In 1938, he painted Swing Landscape, a large-scale mural that has become one of his best-known works.

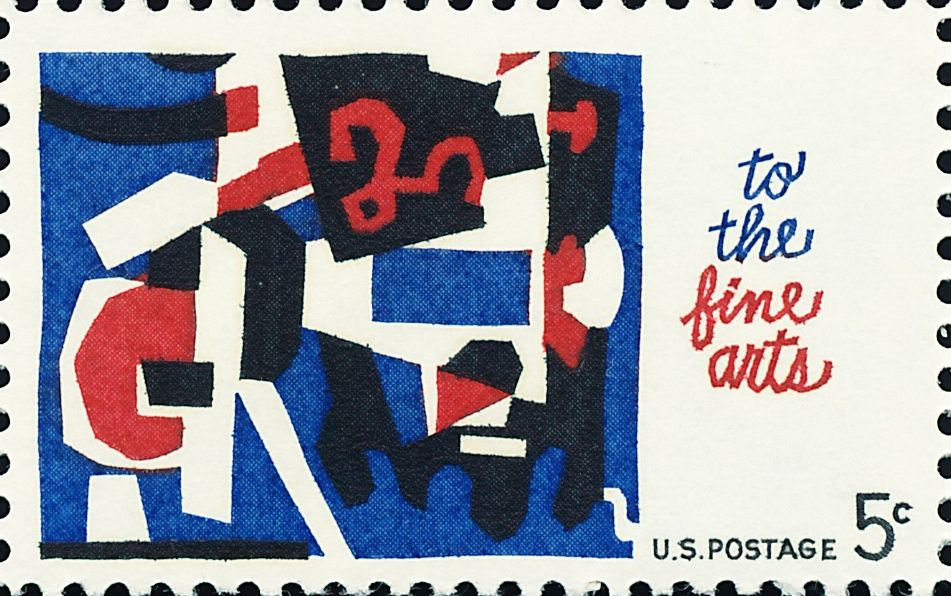
US postage stamp of 1964 featuring 'Detail Study for Cliche' by Stuart Davis

From 1945 to 1951, Davis worked on The Mellow Pad, an abstract painting inspired by jazz. In 1952, he received a Guggenheim Fellowship. He later taught at the New School for Social Research and at Yale University.

Following his death in 1964, the U.S. Postal Service issued a stamp featuring his work Detail Study for Cliche, the first abstract design used on a United States postage stamp.

== Personal life ==
In 1928, Davis traveled to Paris, where he painted street scenes and further engaged with European modernism. In 1929, he married Bessie Chosak. She died in 1932 following complications from an abortion.

In 1938, Davis married Roselle Springer. He died of a stroke in New York City on June 24, 1964, at the age of 71.

== Public collections ==
This list includes selected prominent public collections with documented holdings of Stuart Davis’s work.

- Amon Carter Museum of American Art (Texas)
- Art Institute of Chicago
- Carnegie Museums of Pittsburgh (Pittsburgh, Pennsylvania)
- Cleveland Museum of Art
- Crystal Bridges Museum of American Art (Arkansas)
- Dallas Museum of Art (Texas)
- Fine Arts Museums of San Francisco
- Hirshhorn Museum and Sculpture Garden (Washington, D.C.)
- Israel Museum, Jerusalem
- Metropolitan Museum of Art
- Museum of Modern Art (New York City)
- National Gallery of Australia (Canberra)
- National Portrait Gallery (Washington, D.C.)
- San Francisco Museum of Modern Art (San Francisco, California)
- Smithsonian American Art Museum (Washington, D.C.)
- Whitney Museum of American Art (New York City)

== Selected works ==
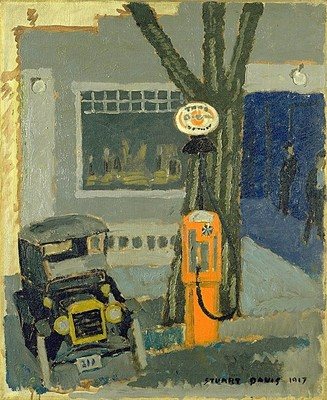
Garage No. 1, 1917, Hirshhorn Museum and Sculpture Garden, Washington, D.C.

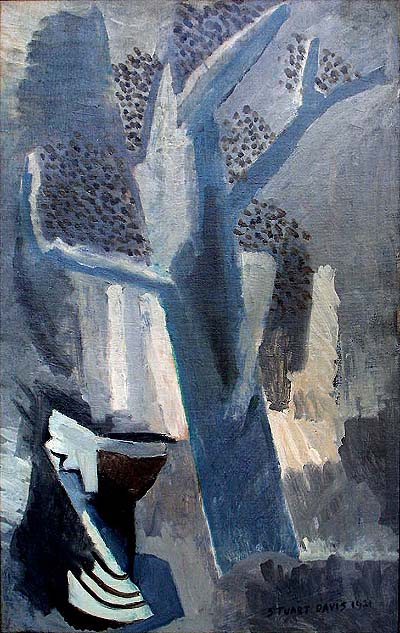
Tree and Urn, 1921, 30 x 19 inches

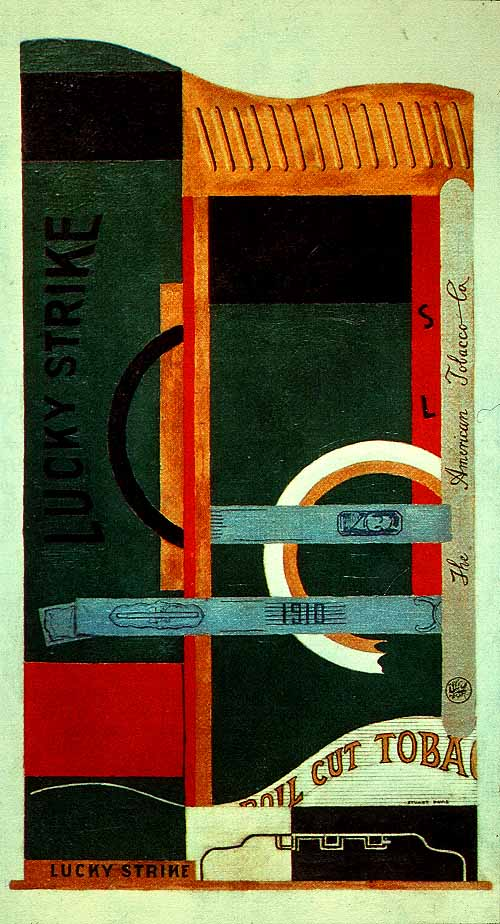
Lucky Strike, 1921, Museum of Modern Art, New York City

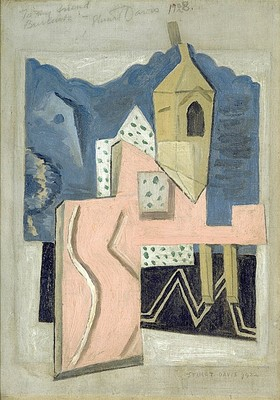
Steeple and Street, 1922, Hirshhorn Museum and Sculpture Garden, Washington, D.C.

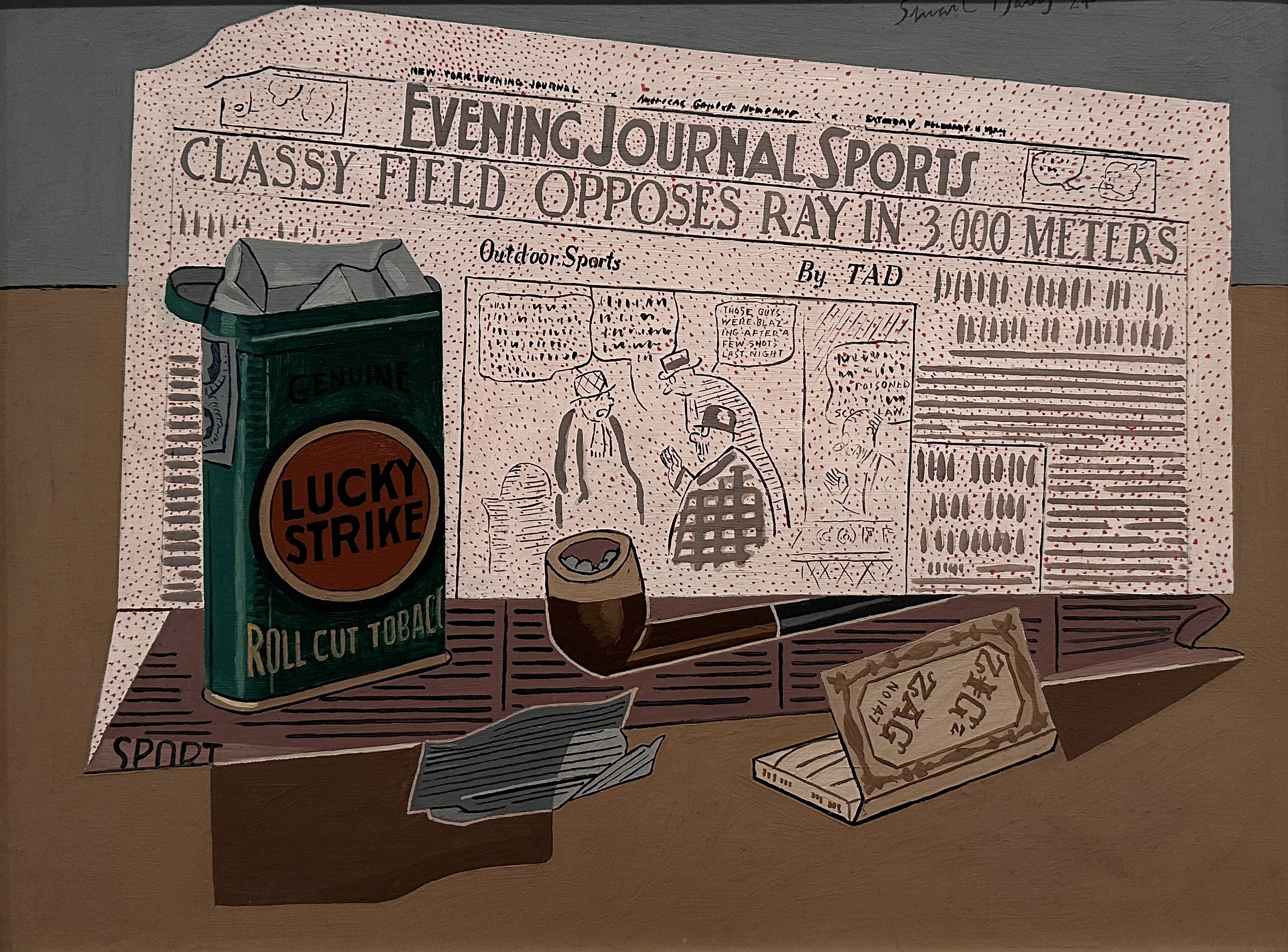
Lucky Strike, 1924, Hirshhorn Museum and Sculpture Garden, Washington, D.C.

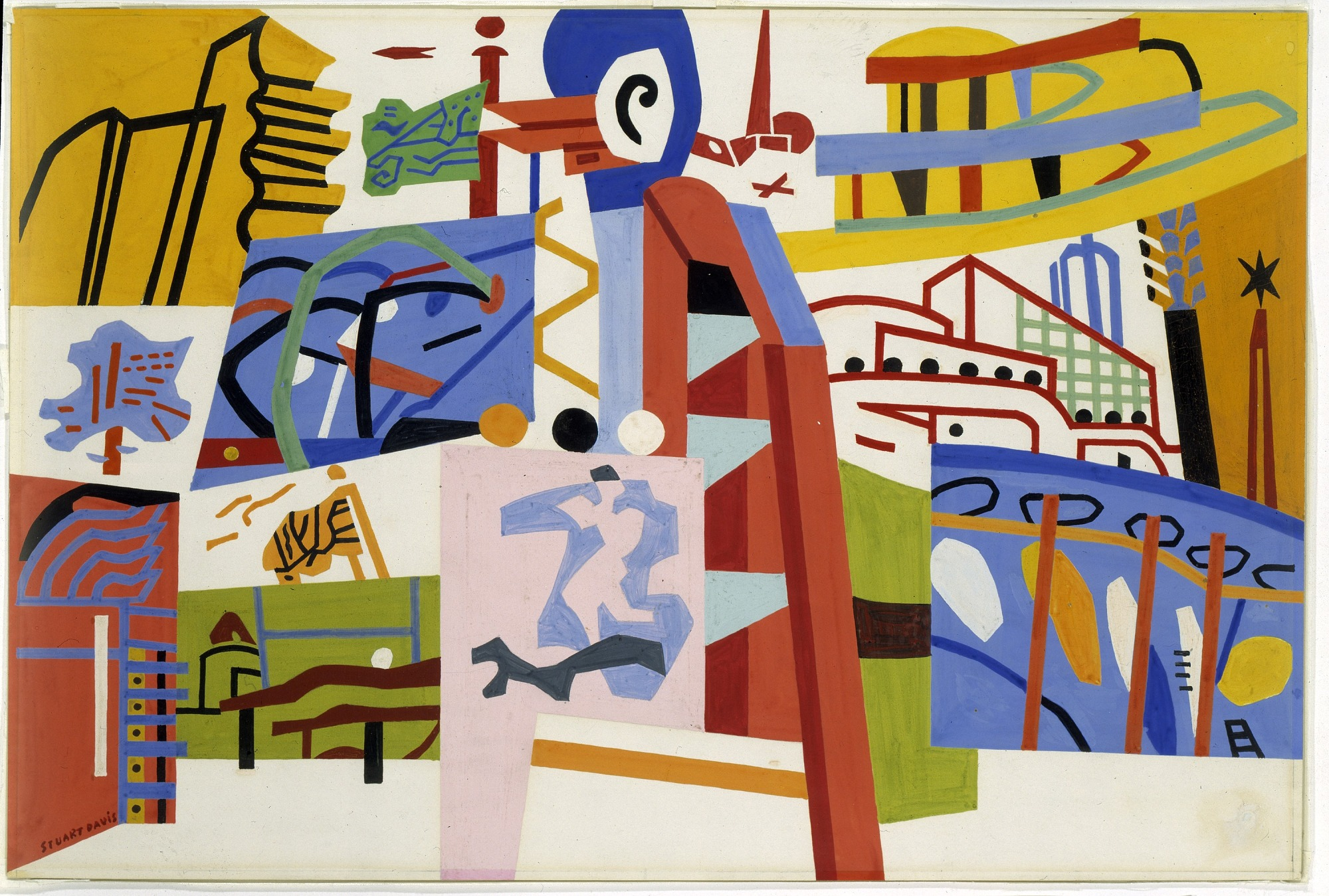
Impression of the New York World's Fair, 1938, Smithsonian American Art Museum, Washington, D.C.

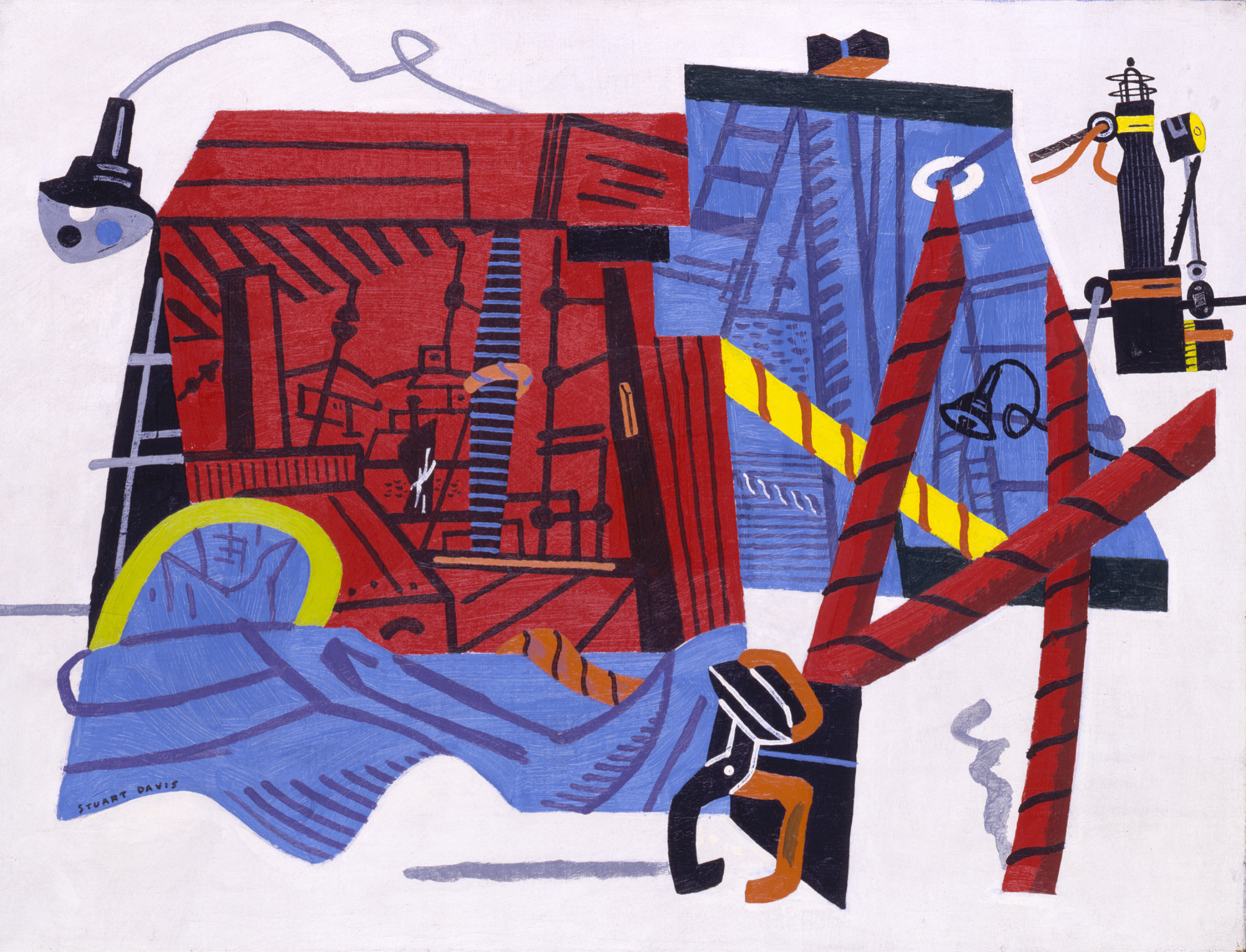
Waterfront Landscape, 1936, Smithsonian American Art Museum, Washington, D.C.

== See also ==
- Precisionism
- The Masses
- The Liberator
- New Masses

== References and sources ==
Sources

- Boyajian, Ani; Rutkoski, Mark, eds. (2007). Stuart Davis: A Catalogue Raisonné (3 volumes). Essays by William C. Agee and Karen Wilkin, Preface by Earl Davis. Yale University Press. ISBN 978-0-30010-981-8.)
- Lane, Grayson Harris (1999). Passantino, Erika D. (ed.). The Eye of Duncan Phillips : a collection in the making. New Haven [u.a.]: Yale University Press. p. 441. ISBN 0-300-08090-5.
- Lowery Stokes Sims et al., Stuart Davis: American Painter, 333 pages, 129 color illus., The Metropolitan Museum of Art and Harry N. Abrams, Inc. 1991.
- Karen Wilkin 1999 - Stuart Davis in Gloucester (ISBN 1-889097-34-9)
