= Glenn Coleman (painter) =

American painter

- Born: July 18, 1887; Springfield, Ohio, United States
- Died: May 8, 1932 (aged 44); Long Beach, New York, United States
- Occupation: Painter

Glenn Coleman (July 18, 1887 – May 8, 1932) was an American painter. His work was part of the painting event in the art competition at the 1932 Summer Olympics. Coleman's Still Life was shown at the Whitney Studio Club's twelfth annual exhibit of painting and sculpture.

Coleman was born in Springfield, Ohio, on July 18, 1887 or 1881, and grew up in Indianapolis, Indiana. In Indianapolis, he studied at an art school. In 1905, he moved to New York and attended the New York School of Art. There, he studied under artists Robert Henri and Everett Shinn. Coleman's work focused on New York City and its street life, often painted in a simplistic style; in later years, his painting style was inspired by Cubism.

Gallery

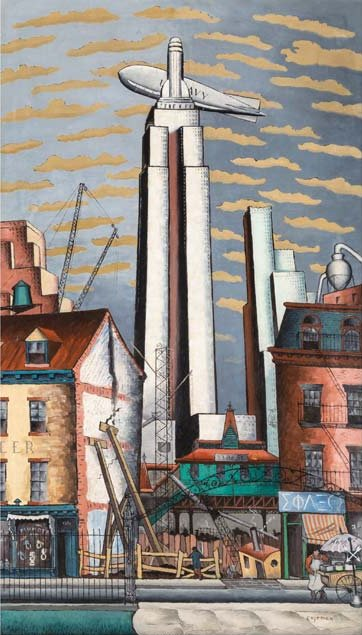
The Empire State Building

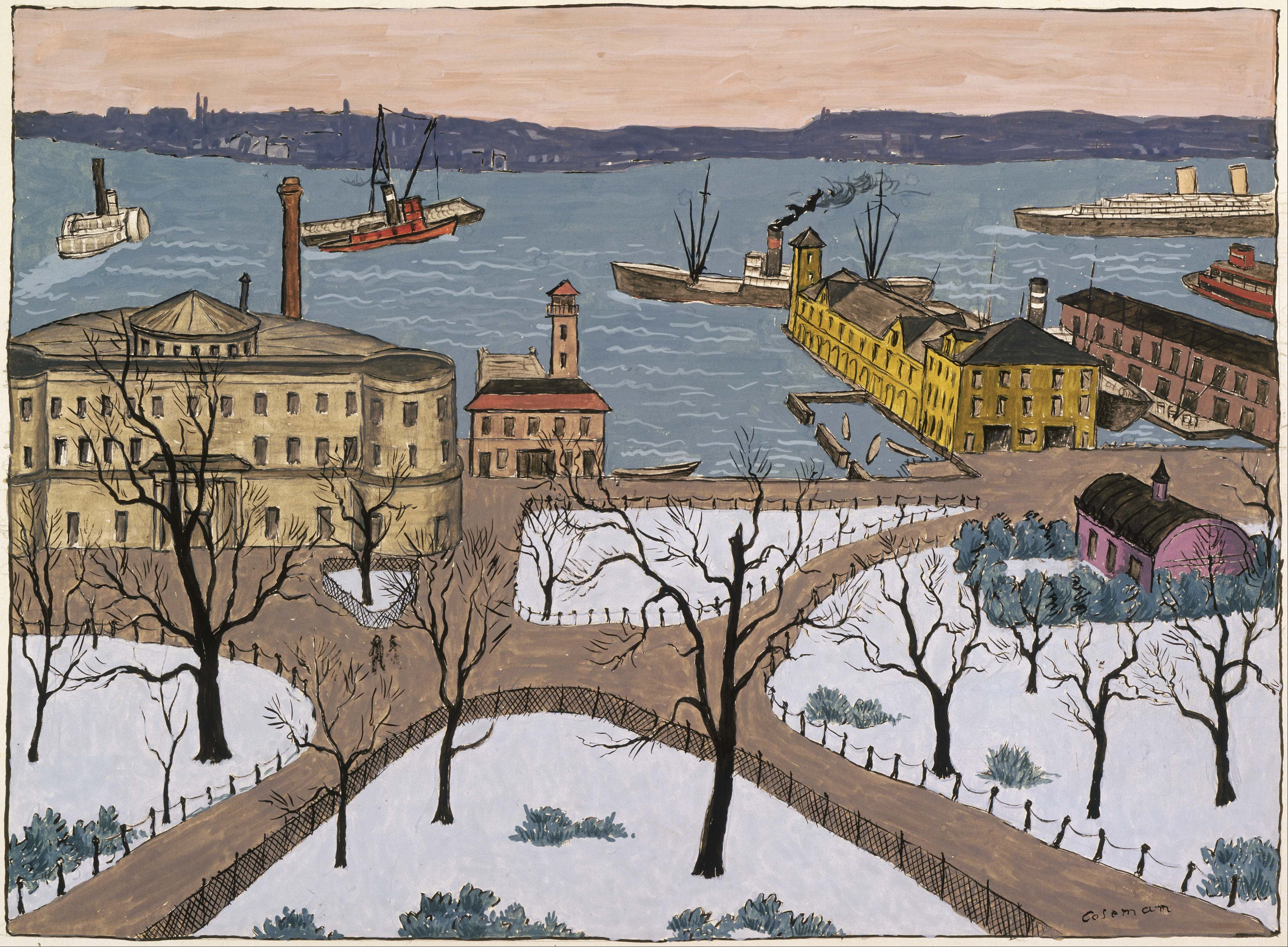
Battery Park
