= Franz Kline =

American painter (1910–1962)

- Kline, c. 1960
- Born: May 23, 1910; Wilkes-Barre, Pennsylvania, U.S.
- Died: May 13, 1962 (aged 51); New York City, U.S.
- Education: Boston University
- Movement: Abstract expressionism, action painting

Painting Number 2 (1954), The Museum of Modern Art

Franz Kline (May 23, 1910 – May 13, 1962) was an American painter. He is associated with the Abstract Expressionist movement of the 1940s and 1950s. Kline, along with other action painters like Jackson Pollock, Willem de Kooning, Robert Motherwell, John Ferren, and Lee Krasner, as well as local poets, dancers, and musicians, came to be known as the informal group, the New York School. Although he explored the same innovations to painting as the other artists in this group, Kline's work is distinct in itself and has been revered since the 1950s.

== Biography ==
Kline was born on May 23, 1910, in Wilkes-Barre, Pennsylvania. When he was seven years old, Kline's father committed suicide. During his youth, he moved to Lehighton, Pennsylvania, where he graduated from Lehighton High School. He served as cartoonist for the school newspaper. His mother later remarried and sent him to Girard College, a boarding school in Philadelphia for fatherless boys. After graduation from high school, Kline studied art at Boston University from 1931 to 1935, then spent a year in England attending the Heatherley School of Fine Art in London. During this time, he met his future wife, Elizabeth V. Parsons, a British ballet dancer. She returned to the United States with Kline in 1938.

Upon his return, Kline worked as a designer for a department store in New York. He then moved to New York City in 1939, and worked for a scenic designer. It was during this time in New York that Kline developed his artistic techniques and gained recognition as a significant artist.

He later taught at a number of institutions, including Black Mountain College in North Carolina and the Pratt Institute in Brooklyn. He spent summers from 1956 to 1962 painting in Provincetown, Massachusetts, and died in 1962 in New York City of a rheumatic heart disease, ten days before his 52nd birthday.

== Artistic development ==
=== Early work ===
Kline's artistic training focused on traditional illustrating and drafting. During the late 1930s and early 1940s, he worked figuratively, painting landscapes and cityscapes in addition to commissioned portraits and murals. His individual style can be first seen in the mural series Hot Jazz, which he painted for the Bleecker Street Tavern in Greenwich Village in 1940. The series revealed his interest in breaking down representative forms into quick, rudimentary brushstrokes.

The personal style he developed during this time, using simplified forms, became increasingly abstract. Many of the figures he depicted are based on the locomotives, stark landscapes, and large mechanical shapes of his native, coal-mining community in Pennsylvania. This is sometimes only apparent to viewers because the pieces are named after those places and objects, not because they actually resemble the subject. With the influence of the contemporary New York art scene, Kline worked further into abstraction and eventually abandoned representationalism. From the late 1940s onward, he began generalizing his figurative subjects into lines and planes that fit together much like the works of Cubism of the time.

In 1946, the Lehighton, Pennsylvania, post of the American Legion commissioned Kline to do a large canvas depicting the town where he had attended high school. The mural Lehighton was acquired from the American Legion post in 2016 by the Allentown Art Museum in Allentown, Pennsylvania, and is today on permanent exhibition there.

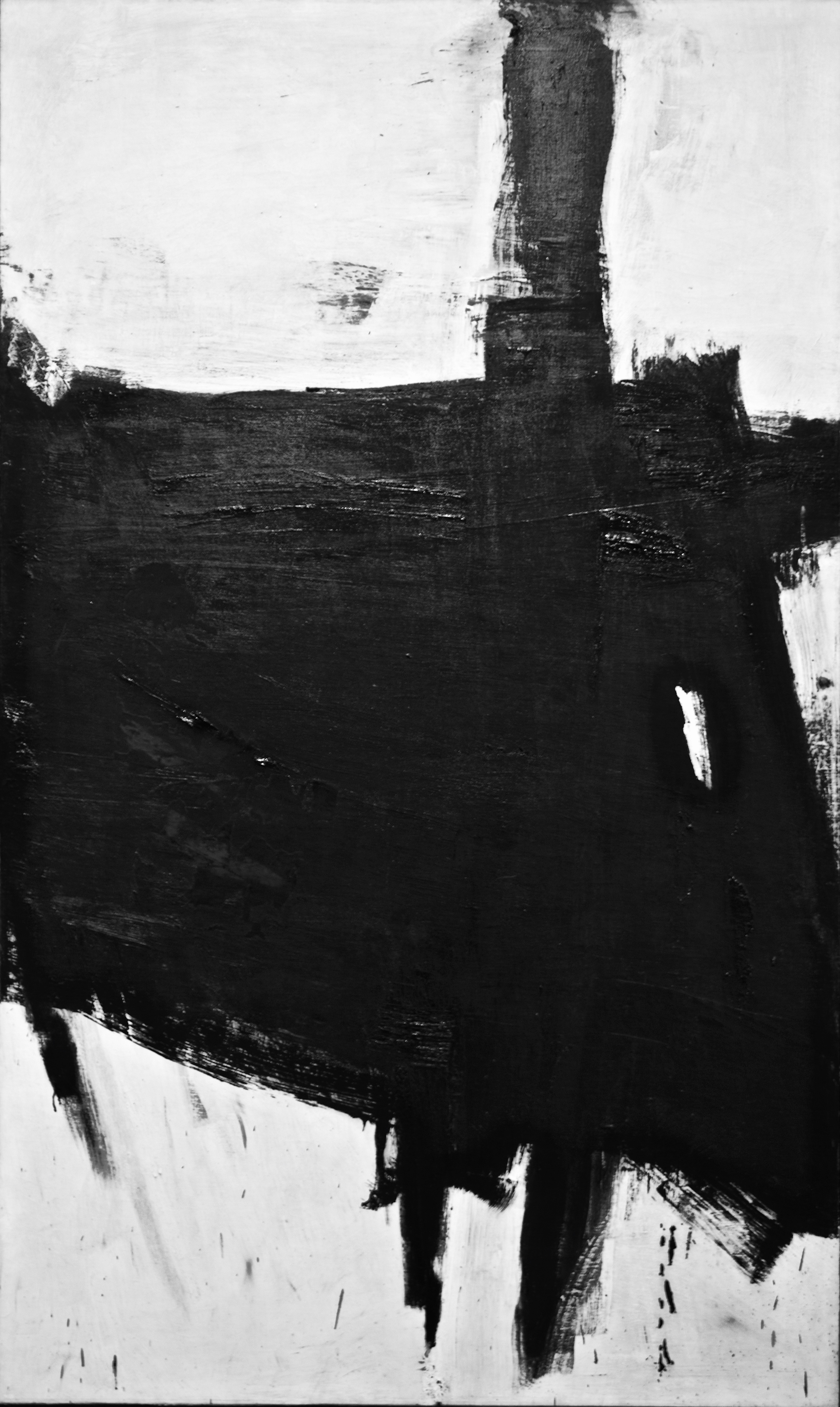
Sabra (1956), Berardo Collection Museum

=== Later work ===
It is widely believed that Kline's most recognizable style derived from a suggestion made to him by his friend and creative influence Willem de Kooning. De Kooning's wife, Elaine, gave a romanticized account of the event, claiming that, in 1948, de Kooning advised an artistically frustrated Kline to project a sketch onto the wall of his studio, using a Bell–Opticon projector. Kline described the projection as such:

"A four-by-five-inch black drawing of a rocking chair...loomed in gigantic black strokes which eradicated any image, the strokes expanding as entities in themselves, unrelated to any entity but that of their own existence."

As Elaine de Kooning suggests, it was then that Kline dedicated himself to large-scale, abstract works and began developing his personal form of Abstract Expressionism. However, even though Willem de Kooning recalls that Kline delved into abstraction "all of a sudden, he plunged into it," he also concedes that it took considerable time, stating that "Franz had a vision of something and sometimes it takes quite a while to work it out." Over the next two years, Kline's brushstrokes became completely non-representative, fluid, and dynamic. It was also at this time that Kline began painting only in black and white. He explained how his monochrome palette was meant to depict negative and positive space by saying, "I paint the white as well as the black, and the white is just as important." His use of black and white is very similar to paintings made by de Kooning and Pollock during the 1940s. There also seem to be references to Japanese calligraphy in Kline's black-and-white paintings, through his exchange with the Japanese avant-garde calligraphy group Bokujinkai and its leader Morita Shiryu, although Kline later denied that connection.

Kline's first one-man show took place between October 16 and November 4, 1950, at New York's Charles Egan Gallery, and consisted of eleven abstract paintings. Color was a rare element in the paintings: brown underpainting near the bottom of Nijinsky and fleeting hints of green in Leda. The paintings displayed a variety of compositions and moods, but they all had one defining trait: Kline's signature style of black on white. In the early 1950s, his work appeared very much inspired by French painter Pierre Soulages, who had exhibited in Betty Parsons' gallery in New York in 1949. In the late 1930s in London, Kline had called himself a "black and white man," but not until the Egan Gallery show had the accuracy of this phase become clear to others. Because of his impact and his concrete style, Kline was dubbed the "black and white artist," a label that stuck with the artist and by which he would occasionally feel restricted. The Egan show was a pivotal event in Kline's career as it marked the virtually simultaneous beginning and end of his major invention as an abstract artist. At the age of forty, Kline had secured a personal style that he had already mastered. There were no real ways for him to further his investigation; he had the potential only to replicate the style he had already mastered. To move on, there was only one logical direction for Kline to go: back to color, the direction he was headed at the time of his premature death from heart failure.

In the late 1950s, in such paintings as Requiem (1958), Kline began experimenting with more complex chiaroscuro instead of focusing on a strict monochromatic palette. Then, in 1958, he reintroduced the use of color in his work through colorful accents in his black-and-white paintings. This exploration back to color-use was still in development when Kline died in 1962. In 2022, a digital catalogue raisonné on "Franz Kline Paintings, 1950–1962" was published by the Hauser & Wirth Institute using the Navigating.art platform.

== Interpretation and legacy ==
Kline is recognized as one of the most important yet problematic artists of the Abstract Expressionist movement in New York. His style is difficult for critics to interpret in relation to his contemporaries.

His paintings are deceptively subtle. While generally his paintings have a spontaneous and dramatic impact, Kline often closely referred to his compositional drawings. He carefully rendered many of his most complex pictures from extensive studies, commonly created on refuse telephone book pages. Unlike those of his fellow Abstract Expressionists, Kline's works were only meant to look like they were done in a moment of inspiration; however, each painting was extensively explored before his housepainter's brush touched the canvas.

Kline was also known for avoiding giving meaning to his paintings, unlike his colleagues who would give mystical descriptions of their works. In a catalog of Kline's works, art historian Carolyn Christov-Bakargiev writes that "his art both suggests and denies significance and meaning." Many of his works have been viewed by art historians as indications of a progression towards minimalist painting. They believe that his works hold an objective opacity and frankness that differs from the subjectivity involved with the New York School's style. This would make his work more similar to the avant-garde platforms like minimalism that replaced the Abstract Expressionist movement in the 1960s.

Art historian David Anfam notes that artists including Robert Rauschenberg, Aaron Siskind, Cy Twombly, Mark di Suvero, and Brice Marden have called Kline an inspiration.

In 2024, Kline was announced as an inductee into the Luzerne County Arts & Entertainment Hall of Fame.

== Art market ==
In 2012, San Francisco financier George R. Roberts sold a nearly ten-foot (3.0 m)-wide, untitled black-and-white work from 1957 at Christie's, New York. The painting went to a telephone bidder for $36 million, or $40.4 million with fees (Christie's guaranteed the seller, Robert Mnuchin, an undisclosed minimum), a record price for the artist at auction and more than six times the previous record, which was set in 2005 when Christie's sold Crow Dancer (1958) for $6.4 million.

A 1940 work of an interior room, UNTITLED, was purchased from Sotheby's in 1995 by a private collector for $21,850. This early piece helps to define Kline's early phase, before his transformation from a realist painter to a groundbreaking abstract expressionist. The painting's bold brushstrokes prefigure the epic black abstraction of his breakthrough style.

In 2018, the Hauser & Wirth Institute, in cooperation with the Estate of Franz Kline, began preparing the catalogue raisonné Franz Kline Paintings, 1950–1962. The project, which presents for the first time an online compendium of Kline's oil-on-canvas works made between 1950 and the artist's death in 1962, was completed in 2022.

== Exhibitions ==
Kline had his breakthrough show at the Charles Egan Gallery in 1950, and he participated in the 9th Street Art Exhibition the following year. In 1958, he was included in the Museum of Modern Art's major exhibition "The New American Painting," which toured eight European cities. In the decade before his death, his work was included in numerous international exhibitions, including the Venice Biennale (1956, 1960); Documenta, Kassel, West Germany (1959); São Paulo Biennial (1957); and Whitney Annuals and Biennials (1952, 1953, 1955, 1961). The Washington Gallery of Modern Art, Washington, DC, organized a memorial exhibition (1962). Major monographic exhibitions have also been held at the Whitney Museum of American Art, New York (1968); Phillips Collection, Washington, DC (1979); Cincinnati Art Museum, traveling to San Francisco Museum of Modern Art and Pennsylvania Academy of Fine Arts (1985); Menil Collection, Houston (1994); Fundació Antoni Tàpies, Barcelona (1994); and Castello di Rivoli, Museo d'arte contemporanea, Italy (2004).

== Selected public collections ==
- Governor Nelson A. Rockefeller Empire State Plaza Art Collection (Albany, NY)
- Metropolitan Museum of Art (New York City)
- Museum of Contemporary Art (Los Angeles)
- Museum of Modern Art (New York City)
- Tate Modern (London)
- Whitney Museum of American Art (New York City)
