= Toko Shinoda =

Japanese artist (1913–2021)

- 篠田 桃紅
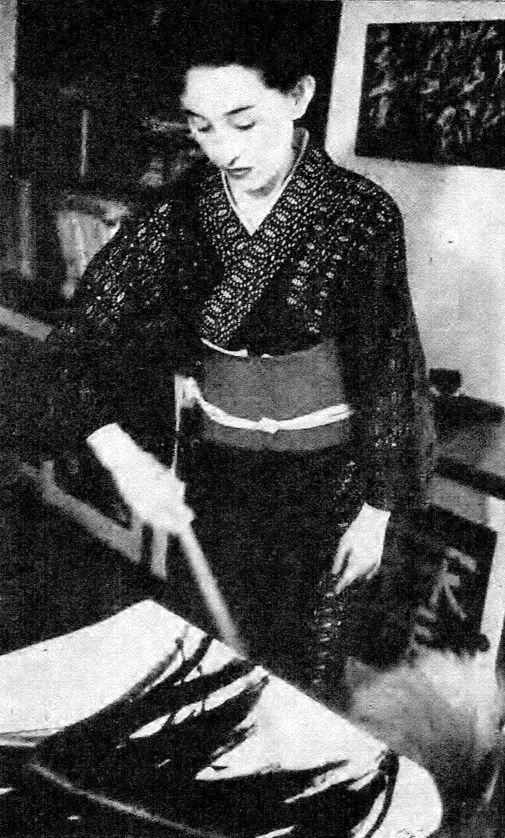
- Born: Shinoda Masuko (篠田満州子); 28 March 1913; Dairen, Kwantung Leased Territory
- Died: 1 March 2021 (aged 107); Tokyo, Japan
- Known for: Painting, calligraphy, printmaking

Toko Shinoda (篠田 桃紅, Shinoda Tōkō; 28 March 1913 – 1 March 2021) was a Japanese artist. Shinoda is best known for her abstract sumi ink paintings and prints. Shinoda's oeuvre was predominantly executed using the traditional means and media of East Asian calligraphy, but her resulting abstract ink paintings and prints express a nuanced visual affinity with the bold black brushstrokes of mid-century abstract expressionism. In the postwar New York art world, Shinoda's works were exhibited at the prominent art galleries including the Bertha Schaefer Gallery and the Betty Parsons Gallery. Shinoda remained active all her life and in 2013, she was honored with a touring retrospective exhibition at four venues in Gifu Prefecture (Gifu Collection of Modern Arts; Toko Shinoda Art Space; Museum of Fine Arts, Gifu; and Gallery Kohodo) to celebrate her 100th birthday. Shinoda has had solo exhibitions at the Seibu Museum at Art, Tokyo in 1989, the Museum of Fine Arts, Gifu in 1992, the Singapore Art Museum in 1996, the Hara Museum of Contemporary Art in 2003, the Sogo Museum of Art in 2021, the Tokyo Opera City Art Gallery in 2022, and among many others. Shinoda's works are in the collection of the Albright-Knox Art Gallery, the Art Institute of Chicago, the British Museum, the Brooklyn Museum, the Harvard Art Museums, the Metropolitan Museum of Art, the Museum of Fine Arts, Boston, the National Museum of Modern Art, Tokyo, the Singapore Art Museum, the Smithsonian Institution, the Solomon R. Guggenheim Museum, the National Gallery of Victoria, and other leading museums of the world. Shinoda was also a prolific writer published more than 20 books.

== Biography ==
=== Early life and education (1913–1936) ===
Shinoda was born in Dairen, Kwantung Leased Territory (today Dalian, China), on 28 March 1913. Her father, Raijirō, worked as the manager of a tobacco factory; her mother, Jōko, was a housewife. Shinoda's given name was Masuko (満州子; literally "child of Manchuria") but later she received the artist name Tōkō (桃紅), meaning "red peach flower". In 1914, her family moved to Tokyo, where Shinoda was raised. Raijirō taught Shinoda various forms of classical poetry and provided her with her first calligraphy instruction at five years old. In 1925, Shinoda entered a women's higher school, where she received calligraphy instruction from a tutor named Setsudō Shimono. After graduation, Shinoda also learned to compose short poems (tanka) with Ayako Nakahara. The art historian Kimihiko Nakamura points out that "While Shinoda was encouraged to engage in intellectual and creative activities from quite a young age, they were still considered part of her feminine accomplishments, and she was not expected to become a professional artist. Shinoda's career eventually broke from the yoke of this pervasive patriarchal dogma that narrowly defined who she was and what she could be". In 1936, at age twenty-three, Shinoda ran away from home and began to earn a living by teaching calligraphy.

=== Early career as a kana calligrapher (1940) ===
In 1940, Shinoda realized her first solo show at the retail stationery store Kyūkyodō in Ginza. "She exhibited calligraphy of her original short poems written in kana (Japanese syllabary), but they were harshly criticized by the calligraphy establishment (shodan) as 'rootless' or lacking a respectable classical foundation". Such negative response was due to "calligraphy's long-standing gendered division of styles". Kimihiko Nakamura points out that "Although a number of female calligraphers had attained fame since the prewar period, they predominantly practiced in kana calligraphy, which traditionalists considered to be a native and demure 'feminine' mode of writing vis-à-vis the foreign and rugged 'masculine' mana (Chinese characters) writing. What was expected in kana calligraphy was a 'feminine delicacy' grounded in the study of the kana diaries and poems produced by the Heian court women in the late tenth and eleventh centuries. Shinoda's unorthodox calligraphy, which neglected such established norms, coupled with the presentation of her own original poems, irritated the calligraphy establishment". Soon after her unsuccessful first solo show, and as the Pacific War quickly escalated, Shinoda evacuated to Aizu, Fukushima, in 1941, and her career was suspended until she recovered from tuberculosis in 1947.

=== Avant-garde calligraphy (zen'ei sho) in early postwar Japan (1947–1956) ===
After the war, Shinoda quickly moved toward abstract expression. The artist noted: "The air of freedom after the war suddenly nurtured the seeds of a desire within me to express the shape of my heart visually. I was suddenly emancipated from the oppressions of my twenties, and my brush moved like an outpour. Like a spur, [this new feeling] pushed me outside the constraints of characters, and it became my exciting job with limitless scope". Her "early works clearly demonstrate that Shinoda had already established her abstract style through the use of brushstrokes and ink splashes that employed a variety of expressions, even before she moved to New York". In postwar Japan, "Shinoda was not the only calligrapher who celebrated the creative freedom and liberating sense of selfhood through calligraphy. Scholars have widely interpreted the flourishing of modernist calligraphy in postwar Japan as a movement initiated by Hidai Nannkoku and his predominantly male students. Nankoku was the son of the calligraphy master Hidai Tenrai, who is often referred to as 'the father of modern Japanese calligraphy.'" Most famously, in 1952, five calligraphers—Shiryū Morita, Yūichi Inoue, Sōgen Eguchi, Bokushi Nakamura, and Yoshimichi Sekiya—formed a new avant-garde calligraphy (zen'ei sho; 前衛書) group called Bokujinkai (墨人会; People of the Ink). These founding members of Bokujinkai had previously worked in Keiseikai (Group of the Megrez Star), a group established by Tenrai's first student Sōkyū Ueda, but under the newly-formed Bokujinkai, declared their "independence from any existing association" and rejected conservative master-student hierarchies in the calligraphy establishment. Meanwhile, Shinoda did not have any master to follow or reject, and she was marginalized in the male-dominated calligraphic community. Kimihiko Nakamura points out that "while kana calligraphy had offered opportunities for women to become professionals, the innovative, modernist terrain of postwar Japanese calligraphy was in fact not open to them, framed as belonging to the leading male calligraphers who were the legitimate heirs of the master Tenrai". Shinoda belonged to the Calligraphic Art Institute (Shodō geijutsu-in; 書道芸術院) from 1950 until 1956, and participated in the fifth Mainichi Calligraphy Exhibition (毎日書道展) in 1953. "These associations provided Shinoda with opportunities to exhibit her work regularly with leading male calligraphers, and gradually she garnered acclaim and financial security. Nevertheless, she was increasingly frustrated with the calligraphic associations' hierarchical structures, their prize systems, and the responsibility of mentoring students. Shinoda maintained a certain distance from this bureaucracy and refused full integration in their activities".

In the 1950s, Shinoda built connections with modernist architects and her works became known beyond the calligraphic community. "In 1954, Shinoda had a critically successful solo show at the Ginza Matsuzakaya department store, displaying her abstract ink paintings in a space specially designed by Tange Kenzō, one of postwar Japan's foremost architects. Further, Shinoda was also commissioned to create large-scale ink murals, including for the Japan Pavilion designed by Tange at the four-hundredth anniversary of São Paulo in 1954, and the Japan Pavilion designed by Kenmochi Isamu at the Washington State Fourth International Trade Fair in 1955, among other venues. From the mid-1950s onward, Shinoda endeavored to expand the definition of calligraphy by collaborating with modernist architects. As her work was shown overseas, she was gradually known beyond the Japanese calligraphic community. In 1954, along with several leading male calligraphers, Shinoda was selected for a group show entitled Japanese Calligraphy at the Museum of Modern Art, New York. The following year, the Brussels-born CoBrA painter Pierre Alechinsky visited Japan and captured Shinoda, Ōsawa [Gakyū], Morita [Shiryū] and Eguchi [Sōgen] in his art film, Calligraphie Japonaise. Importantly, Shinoda was not just a passive beneficiary of postwar internationalism and popular interest in Japanese culture in the Euro-American sphere. In fact, she actively engaged with the international art scene to expand her exhibition opportunities and audiences beyond Japan".

=== American years (1956–1958) ===
In 1956, with an invitation from the Swetzoff Gallery in Boston to hold a one-person exhibition, the 43-year-old Shinoda embarked on a solo journey to the US. "Although Shinoda only had a two-month visitor's visa, it was through the assistance of Okada Kenzō, an established painter at the Betty Parsons Gallery, that she secured her first New York solo show at the Bertha Schaefer Gallery in January 1957". During her two-year stay in the US, Shinoda quickly garnered admiration from her international viewers, and held solo exhibitions at various cities including New York, Cincinnati, Chicago, Paris and Brussels. In 1956, the famous photographer Hans Namuth, who was known for his portraits of Jackson Pollock and other abstract expressionist painters, captured Shinoda executing an abstract ink painting on paper.

=== Becoming a major Japanese artist (1958–2021) ===
During her two-year stay in the US, Shinoda was increasingly frustrated with the dry climate of the US, which was not conducive for producing ink paintings. Upon her return to Japan in May 1958, she remained in the country. In the 1960s, "Shinoda establish [sic] her mature style [that] wide, bold lines—such as blurs, hazes, and subtle but rich variations of tone within a black field—dominate the picture surface and express more clearly the nature of ink". Moreover, from 1960 onwards, Shinoda produced more than 1000 lithographs. For about fifty years, Shinoda's lithographs were printed by the print-maker Kihachi Kimura (木村希八; 1934–2014). In the 1960s, Shinoda was also commissioned for large architectural projects including the grand drape and the porcelain wall relief for the Nichinan Cultural Center (designed by Kenzō Tange) in Miyagi in 1962, the grand drape for the Meijiza Theatre (designed by Isaoya Yoshida) in Tokyo in 1963, the mural for the VIP room of Yoyogi National Gymnasium (designed by Kenzō Tange) in 1964, and the multimedia relief for the Kyoto International Conference Center (designed by Sachio Otani) in 1965. In 1974, Shinoda was commissioned by Zōjō-ji Temple to produce sliding screen (fusuma) paintings that spanned 95 feet (29 m) and extended over three panels.

In the 1960s and 1970s, Shinoda's abstract ink paintings and prints continued to be shown overseas frequently. Shinoda had solo shows at the prominent Betty Parsons Gallery, New York City, in 1965, 1968, 1971, and 1977. Kimihiko Nakamura points out that "Shinoda consciously maintained her distance from the patriarchal and hierarchical Japanese art world and, with her critical success outside her homeland, established herself as an acclaimed international artist". The art historian Midori Yoshimoto also argues that "In the field of calligraphy, [Shinoda] became the first prominent woman artist. She radicalized the traditional medium by pushing abstraction and dynamism to the extreme. Her work was shown not only in calligraphy exhibitions but in exhibitions of abstract art. By crossing the boundaries between calligraphy and Western-style modern art, she invented her own field and as such suppressed male artists". In the 1960s and 1970s, "While Shinoda's monochrome ink abstractions particularly attracted attention on the international art scene, the artist was also seeking a new mode of expression. For example, in Tōtsu yo (In the Far Past) [c. 1964], displayed at her first Betty Parsons Gallery show in 1965, ink completely forms the background and the effective use of silver paint—which changes easily over time, potentially making this piece more luminous at the time of its unveiling—brings a dramatic contrast of light and shade on the picture surface. From the mid-1960s, Shinoda's work gradually began to include a brighter palette including silver, gold, and vermilion (cinnabar), and through the late 1980s and 1990s, she pursued large-scale pieces with backgrounds of silver, gold, or platinum leaf [...]". While Shinoda achieved international recognition as early as in the 1950s, her first museum solo show in Japan was much later in 1989 at the Seibu Museum at Art, Tokyo, followed by the Museum of Fine Arts, Gifu in 1992, and the Hara Museum of Contemporary Art in 2003. Shinoda also became the first Japanese artist to hold a solo show at the Singapore Art Museum in 1996.

Shinoda remained active all her life. In 2013, she was honored with a touring retrospective exhibition at the four venues in Gifu Prefecture (Gifu Collection of Modern Arts; Toko Shinoda Art Space; Museum of Fine Arts, Gifu; and Gallery Kohodo) to celebrate her 100th birthday. In 2016, Shinoda was honored on a postage stamp issued by Japan Post Holdings. She was the only Japanese artist to have been celebrated in this manner while still alive. Shinoda died on March 1, 2021, at a hospital in Tokyo at the age of 107. A year after her death in 2022, two retrospective of Shinoda were held at the Tokyo Opera City Art Gallery and the Musée Tomo, Tokyo.

=== Legacy ===
Shinoda's oeuvre is regularly displayed at the Toko Shinoda Art Space (関市立篠田桃紅美術空間; opened in 2003), and Gifu Collection of Modern Arts (岐阜現代美術館; opened in 2006), both of which are located in Seki, Gifu Prefecture, and managed by the Gifu Collection of Modern Arts Foundation (岐阜現代美術財団). This foundation, in turn, has been funded by the Seki-based local company Nabeya Bi-tech Kaisha (鍋屋バイテック). Although Shinoda never lived in Gifu Prefecture, her farther, Raijirō, was originally from an old family in Akutami-mura (芥見村), Gifu Prefecture.

In 2023 her work was included in the exhibition Action, Gesture, Paint: Women Artists and Global Abstraction 1940-1970 at the Whitechapel Gallery in London.

== Writing ==
- Shinoda, Tōkō. Atarashii shodō jūni-kagetsu: Jojōshi no kaisetsu o soete (新しい書道十二ケ月: 抒情詩の解説を添えて). Tokyo: Dōgakusha, 1954.
- Shinoda, Tōkō. Iroha shijūhachi moji (いろは四十八文字). Tokyo: Yaraishoin, 1976.
- Shinoda, Tōkō. Sumi iro (墨いろ). Kyoto: PHP kenkyūjo, 1978.
- Shinoda, Tōkō. Shudeishō (朱泥抄). Kyoto: PHP kenkyūjo, 1979.
- Shinoda, Tōkō. Sono hi no sumi (その日の墨). Tokyo: Tōjusha, 1983.
- Shinoda, Tōkō, ed. Sumi (墨). Tokyo: Sakuhinsha, 1985.
- Shinoda, Tōkō. Omoi no hoka no (おもいのほかの). Tokyo: Tōjusha, 1985.
- Shinoda, Tōkō. Ichi-ji hitokoto (一字ひとこと). Tokyo: Kōdansha, 1986.
- Shinoda, Tōkō. Kinō no yukue (きのうのゆくえ). Tokyo: Kōdansha, 1990.
- Shinoda, Tōkō. Sumi o yomu: Ichi-ji hitokoto (墨を読む: 一字ひとこと). Tokyo: Shōgakukan, 1998.
- Shinoda, Tōkō. Tōkō: Watashi toiu hitori (桃紅: 私というひとり). Tokyo: Sekaibunkasha, 2000.
- Shinoda, Tōkō. Tōkō ehon (桃紅えほん) = Toko Shinoda Visual Book. Tokyo: Sekaibunkasha, 2002.
- Shinoda, Tōkō. Tōkō hyaku-nen (桃紅百年). Tokyo: Sekaibunkasha, 2013.
- Shinoda, Tōkō. Hyaku-sai no chikara (百歳の力). Tokyo: Shūeisha, 2014.
- Shinoda, Tōkō. Hyakusan-sai, hitori de ikiru sahō: Oitara oita de, manzara de mo nai (一〇三歳、ひとりで生きる作法: 老いたら老いたで、まんざらでもない). Tokyo: Gentōsha, 2015.
- Shinoda, Tōkō. Hyakusan-sai ni natte wakatta koto: Jinsei wa hitori demo omoshiroi (一〇三歳になってわかったこと: 人生は一人でも面白い). Tokyo: Gentōsha, 2015.
- Hinohara, Shigeaki, Shinoda Tōkō, Hori Fumiko, et al. Hyaku-sai ga kiku hyaku-sai no hanashi (一〇〇歳が聞く一〇〇歳の話). Tokyo: Jitsugyōnonihonsha, 2015.
- Shinoda, Tōkō. Jinsei wa ippon no sen (人生は一本の線). Tokyo: Gentōsha, 2016.
- Shinoda, Tōkō. Hyakugo-sai, shinenai no mo komaru no yo (一〇五歳、死ねないのも困るのよ). Tokyo: Gentōsha, 2017.
- Shinoda, Tōkō. Tōkō hyakugo-sai sukina mono to ikiru (桃紅一〇五歳好きなものと生きる). Tokyo: Sekaibunkasha, 2017.
- Shinoda, Tōkō. Kore de oshimai (これでおしまい). Tokyo: Kōdansha, 2021.

== Selected exhibitions ==
=== Solo exhibitions ===
- 1940 Kyūkyodō (鳩居堂), Tokyo
- 1954 Ginza Matsuzakaya Department Store, Tokyo
- 1956 Yōseidō Gallery (養清堂画廊), Tokyo
- 1956 Swetzoff Gallery, Boston
- 1957 Bertha Schaefer Gallery, New York
- 1957 Taft Museum of Art, Cincinnati
- 1957 Art Institute of Chicago, Chicago
- 1957 La Hune, Paris
- 1958 Jefferson Place Gallery, Washington, D.C.
- 1959 Palais des Beaux-Arts, Brussels
- 1965 Betty Parsons Gallery, New York
- 1968 Betty Parsons Gallery, New York
- 1971 Betty Parsons Gallery, New York
- 1977 Betty Parsons Gallery, New York
- 1989 Toko Shinoda (篠田桃紅展), Seibu Museum at Art, Tokyo
- 1992 Toko Shinoda Retrospective (篠田桃紅: 時のかたち), Museum of Fine Arts, Gifu
- 1996 Toko Shinoda: Visual Poetry, Singapore Art Museum
- 1998 Annely Juda Fine Art, London
- 2001 Sōgetsu Kaikan, Tokyo
- 2003 Variations of Vermillion (篠田桃紅: 朱よ), Hara Museum of Contemporary Art, Tokyo
- 2013 Toko Shinoda 100 Years (篠田桃紅: 百の譜), Gifu Collection of Modern Arts, Toko Shinoda Art Space, Museum of Fine Arts, Gifu, and Gallery Kohodo.
- 2013 Trailblazer: The Art of Shinoda Toko, Japan Society, New York
- 2013 Toko Shinoda: A Lifetime of Accomplishment (篠田桃紅の墨象), Musée Tomo, Tokyo
- 2017 Toko Shinoda: In the Autumn of My Years... (篠田桃紅: 昔日の彼方に), Musée Tomo, Tokyo
- 2018 Zōjōj Temple, Tokyo
- 2018－2021 Toko Shinoda: Things Transient － Colors of Sumi, Forms of the Mind (篠田桃紅: とどめ得ぬもの 墨のいろ 心のかたち), Ueda City Museum of Art, Ueda, Nagano, Nariwa Museum, Takahashi, Okayama, Kosetsu Museum of Art, Kobe, the Suiboku Museum, Toyama, and Sogo Museum of Art, Yokohama.
- 2022 Toko Shinoda: A Retrospective (篠田桃紅展), Tokyo Opera City Art Gallery
- 2022 Toko Shinoda: Bridge Over Fleeting Dreams (篠田桃紅: 夢の浮橋), Musée Tomo, Tokyo

=== Group exhibitions ===
- 1954 Japanese Calligraphy, Museum of Modern Art, New York
- 1955 Japan America Abstract Arts (日米抽象美術展), The National Museum of Modern Art (国立近代美術館; present The National Museum of Modern Art, Tokyo, 東京国立近代美術館)
- 1955 Contemporary Japanese Calligraphy: Art in Sumi (現代日本の書・墨の芸術: ヨーロッパ巡回展の国内展示), The National Museum of Modern Art (国立近代美術館)
- 1958 Development of Modern Japanese Abstract Painting (抽象絵画の展開), The National Museum of Modern Art (国立近代美術館)
- 1959 Sumi Paintings of Japan, Rijksmuseum Kröller-Müller, Otterlo
- 1961 6th São Paulo Biennial
- 1961 1961 Pittsburgh International Exhibition of Contemporary Painting and Sculpture, Museum of Art, Carnegie Institute, Pittsburgh
- 1961 Contemporary Japanese Art, Akademie der Kunst, Berlin
- 1967 ROSC '67, Royal Dublin Society, Dublin
- 1971 ROSC '71, Royal Dublin Society, Dublin
- 1973 Development of Postwar Japanese Art: Abstract and Non-figurative (戦後日本美術の展開: 抽象表現の多様化), The National Museum of Modern Art, Tokyo
- 1979 Okada, Shinoda, and Tsutaka: Three Pioneers of Abstract Painting in 20th Century Japan, The Phillips Collection, Washington, D.C.
- 1992 Calligraphy and Painting, the Passionate Age: 1945-1969 (書と絵画の熱き時代: 1945－1969), O Art Museum (品川文化振興事業団O美術館), Tokyo
- 1994－1995 Japanese Art After 1945: Scream Against the Sky, Yokohama Museum of Art, Guggenheim Museum SoHo, and San Francisco Museum of Modern Art
- 1995 Japanese Culture: The Fifty Postwar Years (戦後文化の軌跡 1945-1995), Meguro Museum of Art, Hyogo Prefectural Museum of Art, Hiroshima City Museum of Contemporary Art, and Fukuoka Prefectural Museum of Art
- 2021 Contemporary Women Artists of Japan: Six Stories, The Asahi Shinbun Displays, British Museum

== Major public collections ==
Sources:

- Albright–Knox Art Gallery
- Art Institute of Chicago
- British Museum
- Brooklyn Museum
- Cincinnati Art Museum
- Hakodate Museum of Art, Hokkaido
- Harvard Art Museums
- Kröller-Müller Museum, Otterlo
- Lehigh University Art Galleries
- Luxembourg Royal Collection
- Metropolitan Museum of Art
- Museum fuer Ostasiatische Kunst, Berlin
- Museum of Fine Arts, Boston
- Museum of Fine Arts, Gifu
- Museum Folkwang, Essen
- Museum of Modern Art, Toyama
- National Gallery of Victoria
- National Museum of Modern Art, Tokyo
- National Museum of Singapore
- Niigata City Art Museum
- Singapore Art Museum
- Stadtisches Museum den Haag
- Smithsonian Institution
- Solomon R. Guggenheim Museum
- Tikotin Museum of Japanese Art, Haifa
- University of Michigan Museum of Art
- Yale University Art Gallery
