= Isamu =

- Pronunciation: Í-sá-m(ú)
- Gender: Male

Origin
- Region of origin: Japanese

Isamu (いさむ, イサム) is a masculine Japanese given name.

== Written forms ==
Isamu can be written using different kanji characters and can mean:

- 勇, "courage" or "bravery"
- 勲, "merit"
- 敢, "gallantry"
- 武, "war"

The name can also be written in hiragana or katakana.

== People ==
- Isamu Akasaki (赤崎 勇, 1929–2021), Japanese scientist
- Isamu Chō (長 勇, 1895–1945), Japanese general
- Isamu Fujisawa (藤澤 勇; born 1987), Japanese racewalker
- Isamu Ihara (井原 勇; 1926–2007), Japanese politician
- Isamu Imakake, director of Captain Tsubasa
- Isamu Imoto (井本 勇; 1925–2018), Japanese politician
- Isamu Jordan (1975–2013) American journalist, musician, and professor
- Isamu Kainoyama (海乃山 勇; 1940–1997), Japanese sumo wrestler
- Isamu Kamikokuryo (上国料 勇; born 1970), Japanese video game artist
- Isamu Kashiide (樫出 勇; 1915–2003), Japanese army aviator and flying ace
- Isamu Kasuya (粕谷 勇; born 1944), Japanese former professional Grand Prix motorcycle road racer
- Isamu Kenmochi (剣持 勇; 1912-1971), Japanese modernist designer
- Isamu Kosugi (小杉 勇; 1904–1983), Japanese actor and film director
- Isamu Masuda (増田 勇; 1872–1945), Japanese physician
- Isamu Matsuura (松浦 勇武; born 1991), Japanese former football player
- Isamu Mita (born 1913) Japanese rower
- Isamu Mochizuki (望月 勇; 1906–1944), Japanese officer and ace fighter pilot
- Isamu Nagato (望月 勇; 1932–2013), Japanese actor
- Isamu Noguchi (野口 勇, 1904–1988), Japanese-American artist and landscape architect
- Isamu Osugi (大杉 勇), Japanese mixed martial artist
- Isamu Sekiguchi (関口 勇; born 1910), Japanese skier
- Isamu Shibayama (1930-2018), Peruvian-American civil rights activist
- Isamu Shiina (椎名 勇) Japanese professor
- Isamu Sonoda (園田 勇; born 1946), Japanese retired Olympic champion judoka
- Isamu Sonoyama (園山 勇, 1848–1921), Japanese politician
- Isamu Tajiri (田尻 敢; 1902–1966), Japanese physician
- Isamu Takashima Japanese rower
- Isamu Takeshita (1869–1949), Japanese Imperial Navy admiral
- Isamu Tanonaka (田の中勇, 1932–2010), Japanese voice actor
- Isamu Togawa (戸川 猪佐武; 1923–1983), Japanese writer and political commentator
- Isamu Tsuji (辻 勇; born 1973), Japanese retired football player
- Isamu Ueda (上田 勇; born 1958), Japanese politician
- Isamu Yamada or Knock Yokoyama (山田勇, 1932–2007), Japanese comedian and politician
- Isamu Yamamoto (山本 勇, born 2003), Japanese freestyle skateboarder
- Isamu Yokoyama (横山 勇; 1889–1952), Japanese general
- Isamu Yoshii (吉井勇, 1886–1960), Japanese poet and playwright

== Fictional characters ==
- Isamu Nakane, a character in Obasan
- Isamu Alva Dyson, a character in Macross anime
- Isamu Ozu, a character in tokusatsu show Mahou Sentai Magiranger
- Isamu Nitta, a character in Shin Megami Tensei III: Nocturne video game
- Doll Isamu, a character in Super Doll Licca-chan
- Isamu Akai, a character from the Pocket Monsters manga
- Isamu Kurogane, a character from the Beast King GoLion series
- Isamu Kenmochi (剣持 勇), a character from The Kindaichi Case Files
- Abe Isamu, a character in Into the Breach
- Isamu, a ninja in the Heroscape board game
