= Konstantin Kotyanovsky =

Belarusian painter and artist

- Kanstancin Chacianoŭski
- Born: May 22, 1954 (age 71); Leningrad, Leningrad Oblast, USSR
- Education: Belarusian State Theater and Art Institute

Konstantin Vladimirovich Kotyanovsky (Belarusian: Канстанцін Уладзіміравіч Хацяноўскі, Kanstancin Uladzimiravič Chacianoŭski; Russian: Константин Владимирович Хотяновский, Konstantin Vladimirovich Khotynovsky), is a Belarusian painter and artist.

He graduated from the Belarusian State Theater and Art Institute in 1976. He studied under Pavel Semchenko and L.Tolbuzin. He actively participated in art exhibitions since 1980. Works in the fields of posters, book graphics, design. He was a member of the Belarusian Union of Artists since 1988.

His works are currently stored in the Belarusian National Arts Museum, in the Museum of Modern Art in Toyama, Japan, in the Poster Museum in Wilanów, Poland, in the Museum of Art of the University of Connecticut in the United States, in the BSH Fund, and in the Central House of Artists in Moscow.

Currently, he works as a director of the publishing house "Cavalier" since 1994.

== Main works ==
=== Posters ===
- First Minsk Festival of Sacred Music
- Perestroika
- Last Page of the Red Book
- The Fate of the Planet is Your Destiny
- I am - but who am I?
