= Togawa =

Togawa (written: 戸川) is a Japanese surname. Notable people with the surname include:

- Isamu Togawa (戸川 猪佐武) (1923–1983), Japanese writer and political commentator
- Jun Togawa (戸川 純) (born 1961), Japanese singer, musician and actress
- Kenta Togawa (戸川 健太) (born 1981), Japanese footballer
- Masako Togawa (戸川 昌子) (1933–2016), Japanese singer-songwriter, actress and writer

== See also ==
- Togawa Station (十川駅, Togawa-eki), train station in Goshogawara, Aomori Prefecture, Japan
