= Suiboku Museum, Toyama =

Museum in Toyama, Toyama, Japan

The Suiboku Museum, Toyama
- 富山県水墨美術館
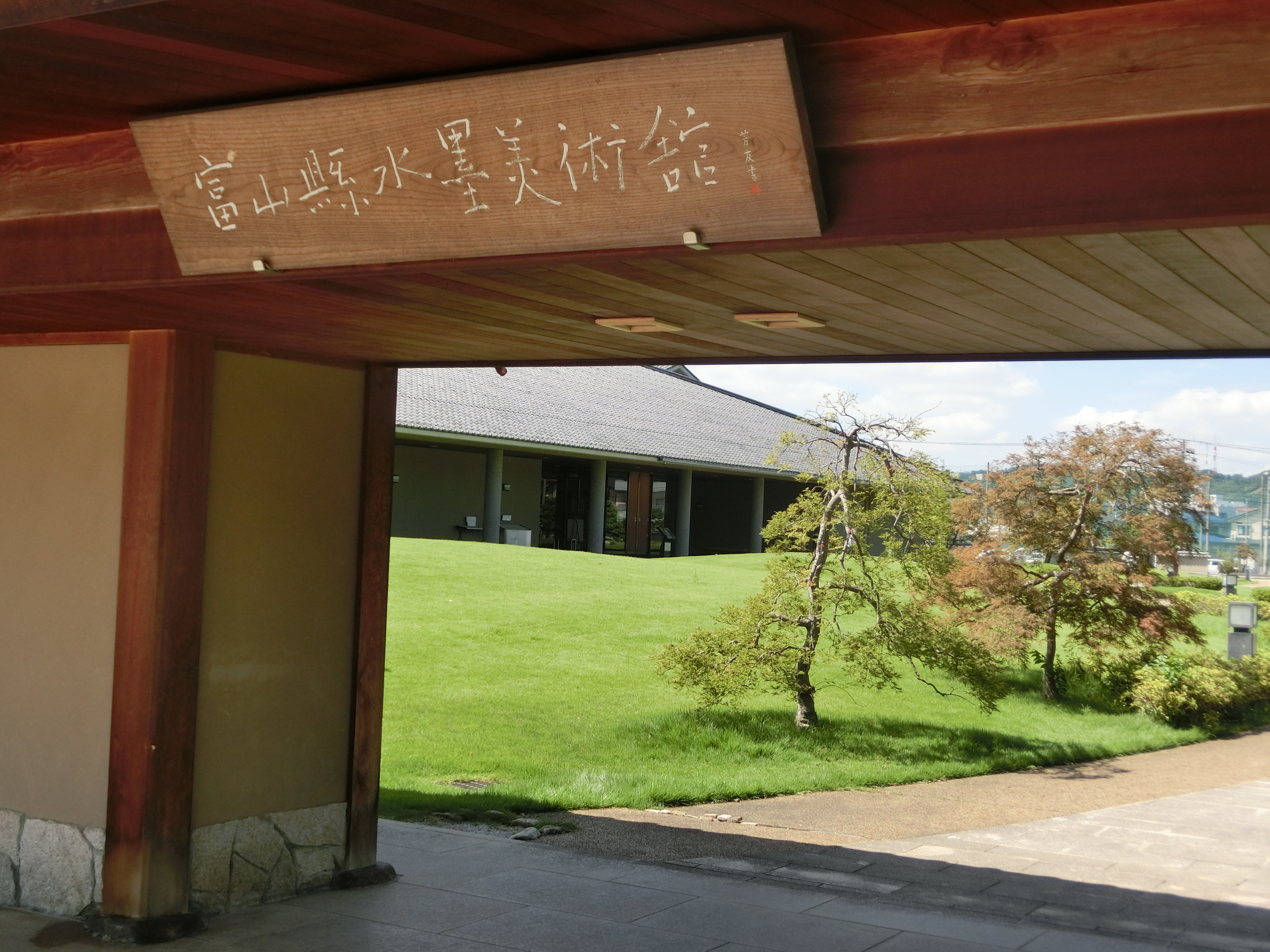
- Interactive map of the The Suiboku Museum, Toyama area

General information
- Location: 777 Gofuku, Toyama, Toyama Prefecture, Japan
- Coordinates: 36°41′57″N 137°11′48″E
- Opened: 29 April 1999

Technical details
- Floor count: 1

Website
- Official website

The Suiboku Museum, Toyama (富山県水墨美術館, Toyama-ken Suiboku Bijutsukan) opened in Toyama, Toyama Prefecture, Japan in 1999. Dedicated to the art of suibokuga or Japanese ink wash painting, the collection includes works by Takeuchi Seihō, Yokoyama Taikan, and Hishida Shunsō, and there is also a garden and tea room.

== See also ==
- Toyama Prefectural Museum of Art and Design
- Toyama Science Museum
- Toyama Castle
