= Annely Juda =

German art dealer

- Born: Anneliese Emily Brauer; September 23, 1914; Kassel, Germany
- Died: August 13, 2006 (aged 91); London, England
- Occupation: Gallery owner
- Spouse: Paul Juda

Annely Juda CBE (born Anneliese Emily Brauer; September 23, 1914 – August 13, 2006) was a German art dealer known for founding the Annely Juda Fine Arts gallery in London. Notable artists represented have included Anthony Caro, David Hockney and Leon Kossoff. Juda introduced several Japanese artists to the London art market.

== Early life ==
Anneliese Emily Brauer was born in Kassel in 1914 and she was brought up in Germany. Her father was a chemist and he had bought a building that had belonged to Goethe. Her mother was a designer of clothing and typefaces. Her family were Jewish and they left to escape persecution following her father being arrested in 1933. Juda's grandmother decided to stay and she eventually committed suicide to avoid being deported by the Nazis. Juda's family went to work in Palestine but after three years she left to find her fortune in London.

In London she met Paul Juda and his family financed her to study dress design and art at the Reimann School. She married Paul Juda on 15 November 1939 and he was able to arrange for her parents to join them in England. In 1939 the war started and she volunteered to work for the Women’s Royal Voluntary Service delivering food to people who had been bombed out of their homes during the blitz. After the war, in 1949, the couple returned to Germany. The couple separated in 1955 and Juda left her husband and returned to England with her son and two daughters.

Juda worked to earn money to feed her three children and she was assisted by Wilma Kuvecke in 1956. Kuvecke had worked for her in Germany and she followed Juda to London where she took a job so that she could be the Juda children's unpaid nanny.

== Career ==
=== Beginnings as art dealer ===
In 1956 Juda found work assisting in the art business – including at the Estorick Collection of Modern Italian Art, which immersed her in the art of the Italian Futurists – and by 1960 she had started the Molton Gallery. The Hamilton Gallery followed from 1963 to 1967, with backing from Nika Hulton. She exhibited American art, including work by Jackson Pollock and British artists such as William Turnbull, Robyn Denny and Gillian Ayres. Her exhibitions were full of abstract pictures that visitors could interpret with the gallery's brochures.

=== Annely Juda Fine Art ===
In 1968 Juda joined forces with her son, David, to form the first gallery called Annely Juda Fine Arts, located on Tottenham Mews. The gallery educated London about abstract art and her first exhibition was titled "The Non-Objective World". The gallery's shows featured artists including Piet Mondrian and Theo van Doesburg from the De Stijl group of artists.

In 1990, the gallery moved from its Tottenham Mews space to premises in Dering Street, Mayfair.

In 1998 Juda was appointed as a Commander of the Order of the British Empire and she took Wilma Kuvecke with her to the ceremony. Kuvecke remained with Juda until she died in London in 2006. Her gallery is still being run by her son, David. David has been serving on the selection committee of Art Basel.

Notable artists represented by Juda have included Anthony Caro, David Hockney, Leon Kossoff and Christo (since 1968). Juda introduced several Japanese artists; she represented Tadashi Kawamata, Katsura Funakoshi, Yuko Shiraishi and Toko Shinoda.

In 2022, Annely Juda Fine Arts teamed up with L.A. Louver, Gray, Pace and Galerie Lelong to show David Hockney's most recent works at more or less the same time in five different cities.

In 2025, the gallery announced plans to move to nearby Hanover Square, Westminster, where it is to occupy three floors of a Grade II-listed Georgian townhouse, with two floors dedicated to exhibition spaces including a former ballroom with a glass-domed ceiling.
