= Autoerotic fatality =

Accidental death occurring during sexual self-stimulation

Autoerotic fatalities are accidental deaths that occur during sexual self-stimulation when an apparatus, device or prop that is being employed to enhance pleasure causes the death. Researchers only apply the term to unintentional deaths resulting from solitary sexual activity, not suicide or acts with a partner. The incidence of autoerotic fatalities in Western countries is around 0.5 per million inhabitants each year.

Autoerotic asphyxia is the leading cause. 70 to 80% of autoerotic deaths are caused by hanging, while 10 to 30% are attributed to plastic bags or chemical use. Both of these lead to autoerotic asphyxia. 5 to 10% are related to electrocution, foreign body insertion, overdressing/body wrapping, or another atypical method. Specific causes include the use of chemicals such as amyl nitrite, GHB, or nitrous oxide, and props and tools such as knives, oversized dildos, ligatures or bags for asphyxiation, duct tape, electrical apparatus for shocks, water for self-immersion, fire-making equipment for self-immolation, or sharp, unhygienic or large fetishized objects.

The subject has been treated in two books, Autoerotic Fatalities by Hazelwood et al. (1983) and Autoerotic Asphyxiation: Forensic, Medical, and Social Aspects by Sheleg et al. (2006).

== Famous cases ==
- Peter Anthony Motteux, English author, playwright, translator, publisher and editor of The Gentleman's Journal, "the first English magazine", from 1692 to 1694, died from apparent assisted erotic asphyxiation in 1718, which is most likely the first recorded case.
- Frantisek Kotzwara, composer, died from erotic asphyxiation in 1791.
- Albert Dekker, stage and screen actor, was found dead in his bathroom in 1968 with his body graffitied and a noose around his neck.
- Nigel Tetley (c. 1924 – 2 February 1972) was a British sailor who was the first person to circumnavigate the world solo in a trimaran. His body was found hanging from a tree in woods near Dover, England. At the coroner's inquest, it was revealed that the body had been discovered clothed in lingerie and the hands were bound behind the back. The opinion offered by a pathologist suggested masochistic sexual activity.
- Vaughn Bodē, artist, died from autoerotic asphyxiation in 1975.
- Diane Herceg sued Hustler magazine in 1983, accusing it of causing the death of her 14-year-old son, Troy D., who had experimented with autoerotic asphyxia after reading about it in that publication.
- Stephen Milligan, a British politician and Conservative MP for Eastleigh, died from autoerotic asphyxiation combined with self-bondage in 1994.
- Kevin Gilbert, a musician and songwriter, died of apparent autoerotic asphyxiation in 1996.
- David Carradine was found dead on 4 June 2009 from accidental asphyxiation, according to the medical examiner who performed a private autopsy on the actor. His body was found near naked and hanging by a rope in a closet in his hotel room in Thailand, and there was evidence of a recent orgasm; two autopsies were conducted and concluded that his death was not suicide, and the Thai forensic pathologist who examined the body stated that his death may have been due to autoerotic asphyxiation. Two of Carradine's ex-wives, Gail Jensen and Marina Anderson, stated publicly that his sexual history included the practice of self-bondage.
- Kristian Digby was found dead on 1 March 2010 in what police said were "unexplained circumstances". The television presenter's post-mortem examination was held on 2 March 2010 and the results were inconclusive. The police were satisfied that there was no third-party involvement and the press reported his death was caused by auto-erotic asphyxiation. On 9 November 2010, a coroner recorded a verdict of death by misadventure.

Although Paula Yates contradicted earlier statements she had made by saying during a 1999 interview that Michael Hutchence's 1997 death might have been caused by autoerotic asphyxiation, the coronial inquest found it to be suicide due to a combination of depression and intoxication with alcohol and other drugs.

== See also ==
- Death during consensual sex
