= Kyoto International Conference Center =

Large conference facility in Kyoto, Japan

- 国立京都国際会館
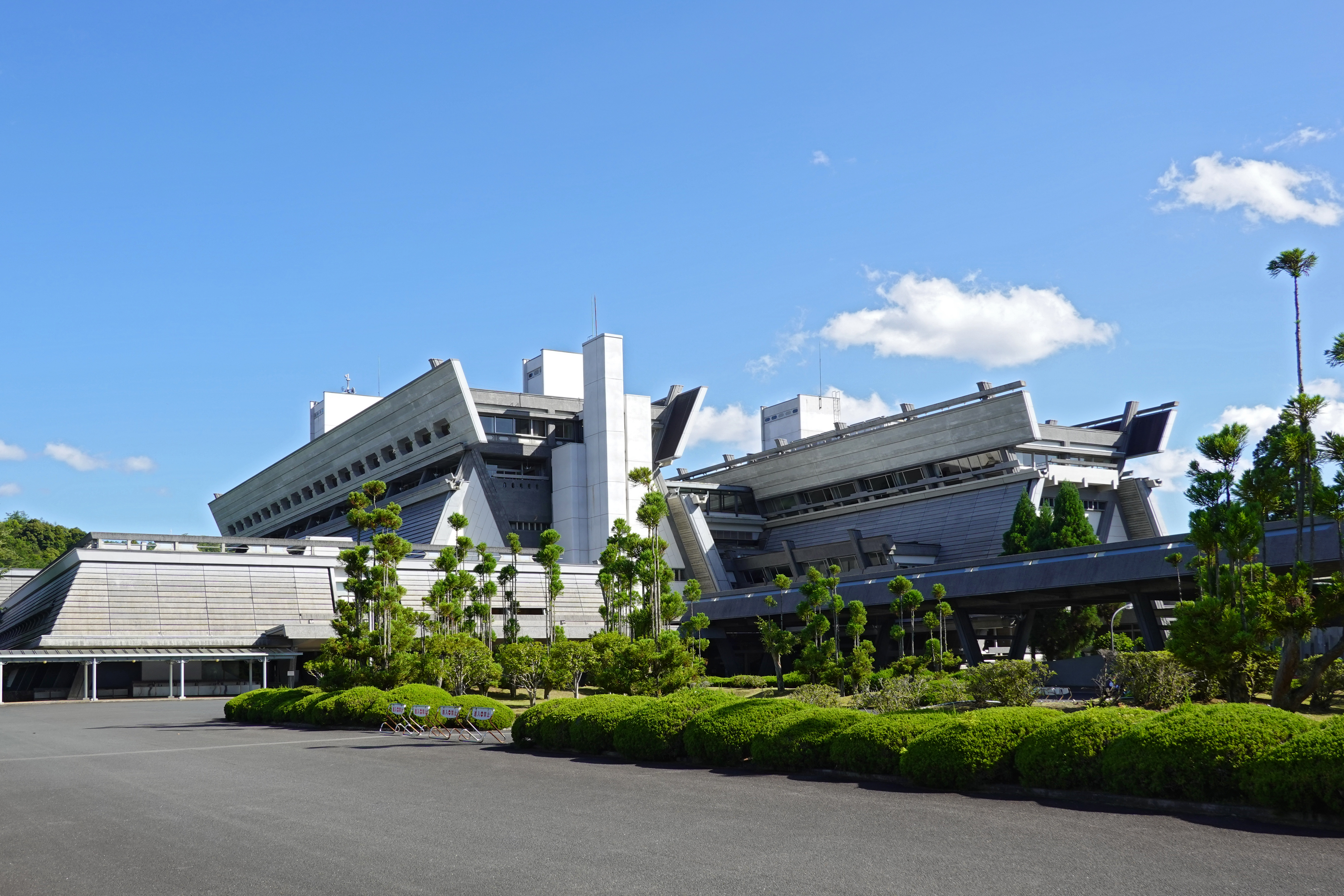

- Location within Kyoto city Location within Japan
- Former names: Kyoto International Conference Hall
- Alternative names: Kokuritsu Kyōto Kokusai Kaikan

General information
- Status: Completed
- Type: conference facility
- Architectural style: Metabolism
- Location: Takaragaike, Sakyō-ku, Kyoto, Kyoto Prefecture, Japan, Kyoto, Japan
- Coordinates: 35°03′40″N 135°46′59″E
- Construction started: 24 January 1964
- Completed: 20 March 1966
- Opened: 21 March 1966
- Renovated: 1973, 1985, 1998

Technical details
- Grounds: 156,000 m²

Design and construction
- Architect: Sachio Otani
- Other designers: Isamu Kenmochi

Other information
- Seating capacity: 1,000 (Annex); 1,600 (New Hall); 1,840 (Auditorium); 2,500 (Event Hall)

Website
- icckyoto.or.jp

The Kyoto International Conference Center (国立京都国際会館, Kokuritsu Kyōto Kokusai Kaikan), abbreviated as ICC Kyoto and previously called the Kyoto International Conference Hall, is a large conference facility located at Takaragaike, Sakyō-ku, Kyoto, Kyoto Prefecture, Japan. The Kyoto Protocol was signed in this hall.

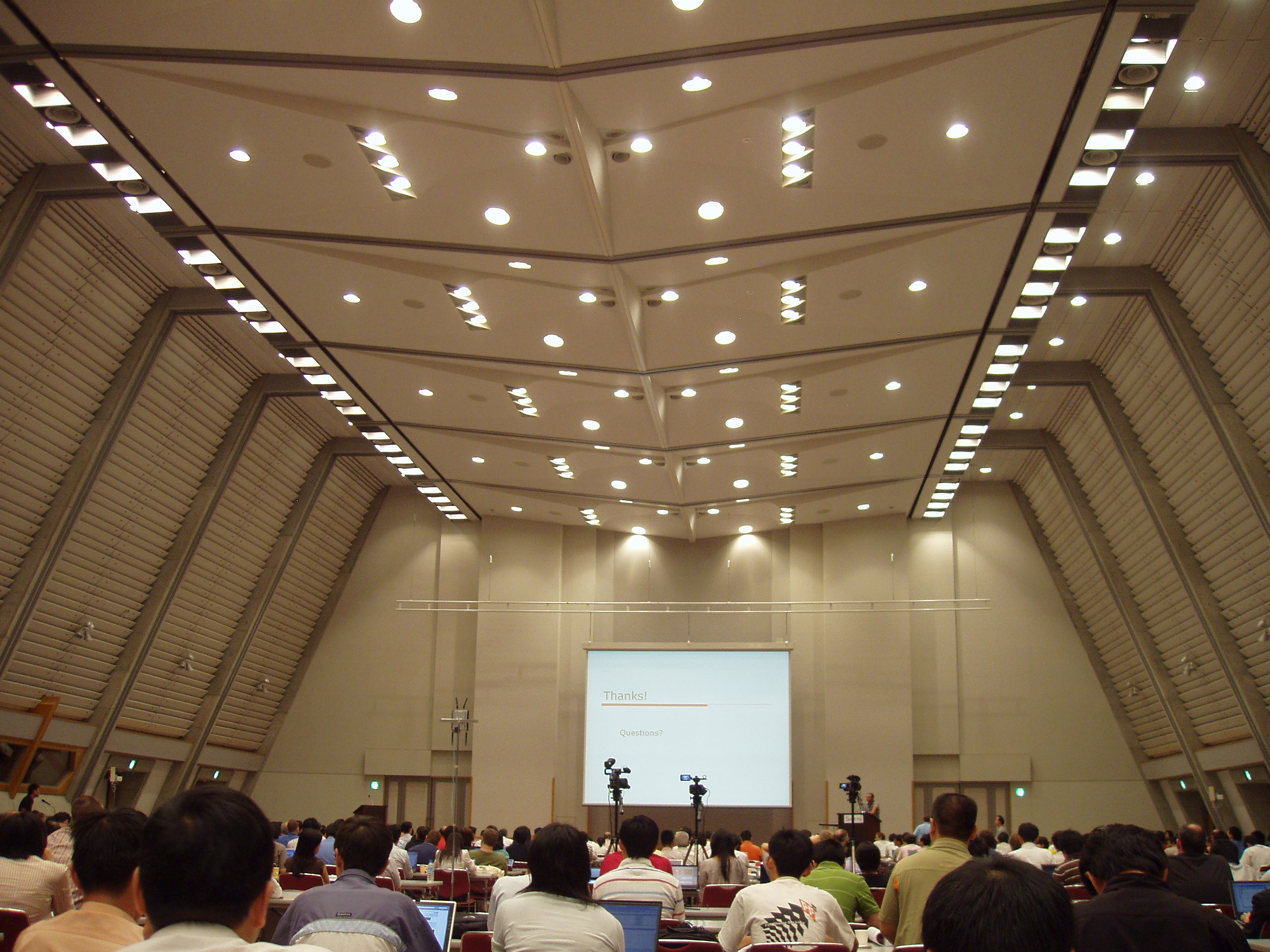
Annex Hall interior

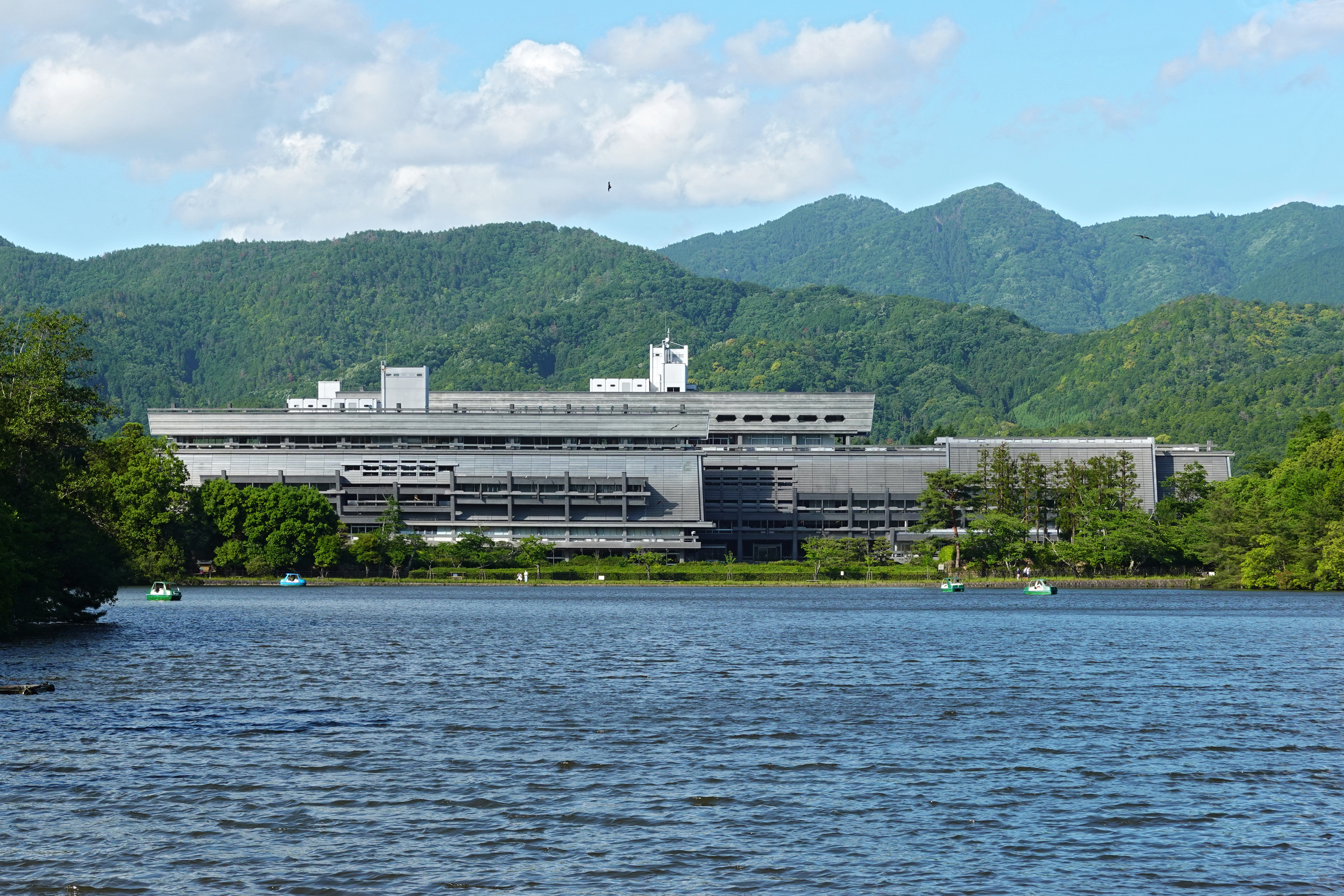
The conference center at Takaragaike Park

The center was designed by architect Sachio Otani to an unusual hexagonal framework, resulting in few vertical walls or columns, and opened in 1966 with an addition in 1973. It is a rare remaining example of Metabolism in Japan (the newer and more famous Nakagin Capsule Tower Building was demolished in 2022). Today the total facility provides 156,000 m² of meeting space, and consists of the main Conference Hall with large meeting room (capacity 2,000) and a number of smaller rooms, an Annex Hall (capacity 1,500) and Event Hall, with The Prince Kyoto Takaragaike Hotel nearby. Both Main Hall and Annex Hall are equipped with simultaneous interpreting facilities for 12 languages.

It is located north of downtown Kyoto, and may be reached via the Karasuma Line subway.

== In popular culture ==
- The complex is the location for the finale of John Frankenheimer's cult 1982 martial arts action film The Challenge, starring Scott Glenn and Toshiro Mifune.
- The complex also serves as the backdrop for a meeting between Harry Kilmer (Robert Mitchum) and Goro Tanaka (James Shigeta) in The Yakuza (1975).
- An exterior shot of the complex is the location for the Kanemitsu World Headquarters in RoboCop 3 (1993).

== Past events ==
- 1994 International Telecommunication Union Plenipotentiary Conference
- 1997 United Nations Framework Convention on Climate Change (Kyoto Protocol)
- 2003 World Water Forum

== Access ==
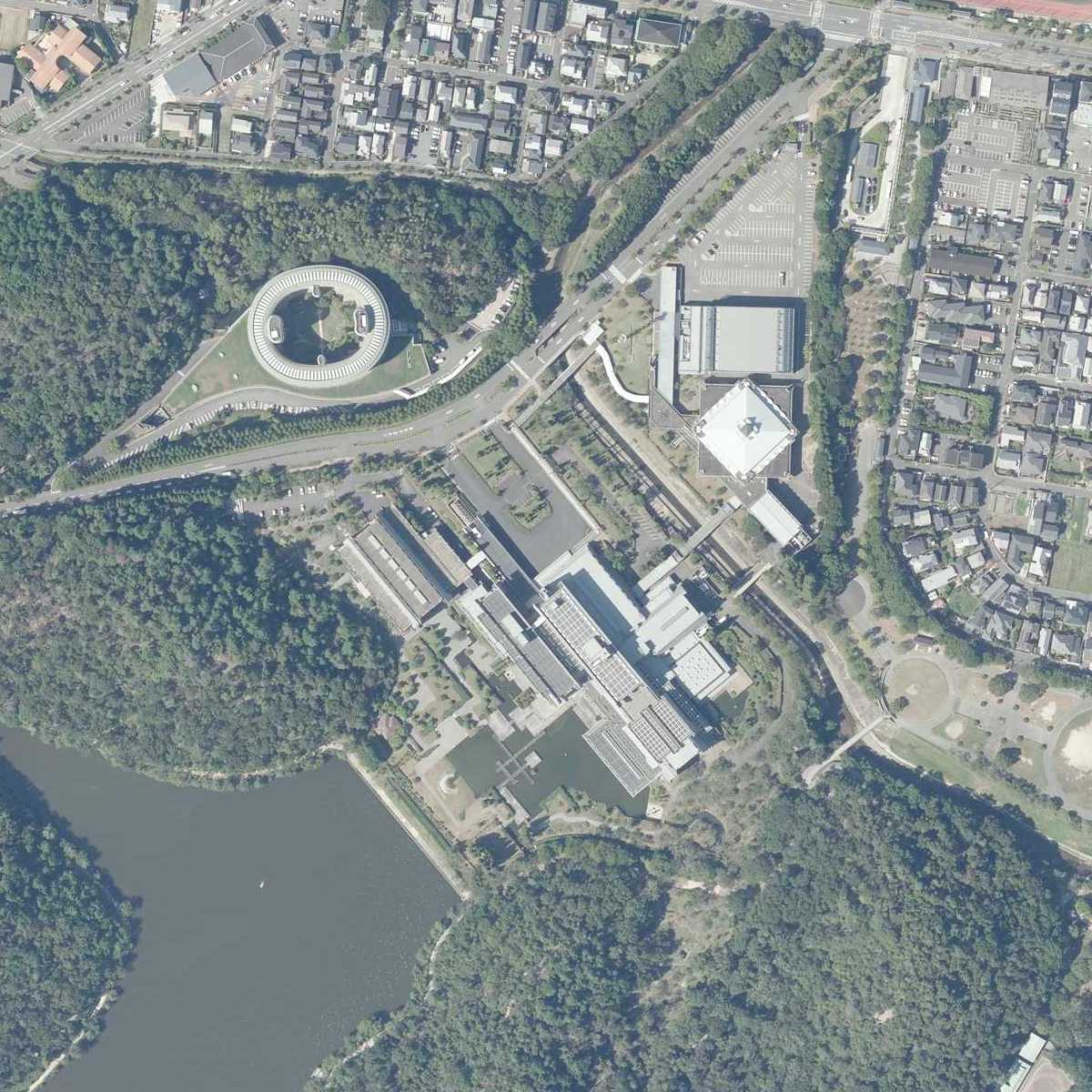
Aerial photo

- Karasuma Line: Kokusaikaikan Station
- Kyoto City Bus: Kokusaikaikan Sta.
- Kyoto Bus: Kokusaikaikan-ekimae
