= Waichi Tsutaka =

Japanese visual artist (1911–1995)

Waichi Tsutaka (津高和一, Tsutaka Waichi, November 1, 1911, in Osaka – January 17, 1995, in Nishinomiya) was a Japanese visual artist, mainly known as painter and poet.

Tsutaka has been recognized as one of the leading postwar Japanese abstract painters for his calligraphic paintings, which explored the formal, textual, and material variety of lines. He also created ink paintings, watercolors, drawings, lithographs, ceramic plates, stone carvings, collages, and illustrations for publications, as well as poems, essays and articles on art, and exhibitions reviews.

Tsutaka was an influential figure in the cultural life of the Hanshin region, who vitally engaged in artist groups and platforms for cross-genre exchange, in art education, and in art projects and outdoor exhibitions that aimed at breaking down the separation between art and (everyday) life, making art accessible for a broader public, and fostering dialogue through art.

== Biography ==
=== Early life ===
Born in 1911 in Osaka as the son of a rice dealer, Tsutaka was adopted by his older half-brother and moved to Nishinomiya in 1914 following his father's bankruptcy. In his youth Tsutaka showed an interest in literature and poetry. He enlisted and served in the military from 1932 to 1933. In 1937, he joined the Surrealist poets circle Kōbe Shijin (Kobe Poet), which would in 1940 become a target of anti-communist oppression in Japan. Under the provisions of the Public Security Preservation Laws, in the so-called Kobe Poet Incident, several members were arrested and interrogated under the suspicion of undermining the political and social order. Tsutaka was spared persecution but became aware of how poetry as a form of verbal expression could be seen as dangerous politically. In 1939, he began to study painting at the Nakanoshima Yōga Kenkyūjo (Nakanoshima Institute of Western Painting), a private art school in Osaka, and also briefly worked for the Japanese Red Cross Society. In 1940, Tsutaka was again drafted into the army, and he was sent to Manchuria in 1941. He returned to Japan in 1943.

=== 1946–1960: Postwar career and interdisciplinary engagement ===
In 1946, Tsutaka joined the avant-garde cross-genre discussion group Kai Variete (Variété Society), and began to participate in the annual juried exhibition of Kōdō Bijutsu Kyōkai (Action Art Association, commonly known as Kōdō), of which he became an official member in 1952. He became a contributor to the poetry magazines Hi no tori (Fire Bird) in 1947, and Tenbin (Scale) in 1950, and continued to engage in interdisciplinary exchange. He became a vital member of Gendai Bijutsu Kondankai (Contemporary Art Discussion Group, commonly known as Genbi), which was founded in 1952 by Jirō Yoshihara, Kokuta Suda and others as a forum for a free interdisciplinary exchange among artists, critics, and scholars from the Kansai region. In addition to painters and sculptors, the group included avant-garde practitioners of the traditional arts: ceramics (such as Sōdeisha), calligraphy (such as Bokujinkai) and ikebana. Tsutaka contributed talks and exhibitions reviews to Genbi. Around this time, Tsutaka began to create murals, fashion design and stage sets for fashion shows and theaters. With Yoshihara, Suda, Kazuo Yagi, and others, Tsutaka in 1955 co-founded the Kansai section of the International Art Club. In 1956 he co-founded the Seikatsu Zōkei Kyōkai (Association of Plastic Arts for Everyday Life), which aimed at breaching the separation between art and life by providing works made of everyday materials or for everyday use.

Tsutaka's breakthrough as painter occurred in the early 1950s when art critic Atsuo Imaizumi praised his paintings Boshi-zō (Mother and Child) at the 6th Kōdō Exhibition in 1951 and Maisō (Burial) at the 7th Kōdō Exhibition in 1952. Tsutaka was subsequently recognized as one of the leading Japanese artists, and his works were presented in major exhibitions and survey shows of contemporary Japanese art, such as Gendai Nihon bijutsuten (The Contemporary Art Exhibition of Japan) from 1954 to 1969, Nihon kokusai bijutsu-ten (International Art Exhibition Japan) from 1955 to 1965, Nichibei bijutsu-ten (Abstract Art Exhibition: Japan and USA) in 1955, and Sekai – konnichi no bijutsu (Exhibition international d’art actuel) in 1956.

Tsutaka's paintings were included in exhibitions of contemporary Japanese art abroad, such as Six Contemporary Japanese Artists (1956) at the Smithsonian Institution and other venues in the US, The Japan Contemporary Art Circuit Exhibition in Europe (1958) shown in cities in Italy, France, Germany, Yugoslavia, Egypt, and Iran, Egypt, Yugoslavia, Iran, and Contemporary Japanese Art (1958) touring Australia and New Zealand. In 1957 Tsutaka was selected as one of the Japanese participants in the 4th São Paulo Art Biennial. During the Biennial in 1959 Tsutaka held solo exhibitions in Brazil, Argentina, and Peru. Tsutaka's painting The Infinite (1960) was shortlisted by the Japanese jury for the 3rd Guggenheim International Award in 1960.

=== 1960–1990: Expansion of artistic mediums, art and everyday life ===
Tsutaka's participation in national and international exhibitions continued from the 1960s to the 1980s: for example, Japanische Malerei der Gegenwart in Berlin, Frankfurt and Essen in 1961, and the Nihon no chūshō kaiga ten (Japanese Abstract Painting Exhibition) at the National Museum of Modern Art Tokyo in 1963. In 1962 Tsutaka travelled to Italy and showed his work in solo shows in Venice and Trieste, extending his stay in Europe until early 1963. His paintings Black and White (1961), Cosmos (1963), Accept the Inevitable (1964), and Untitled (1964) were included in the exhibition The New Japanese Painting and Sculpture at the Museum of Modern Art in New York in 1965. At the invitation of the University of São Paulo, Tsutaka travelled to Brazil in 1970, and again for solo shows in Rio de Janeiro and São Paulo in 1971. In 1972 his work was presented at the 7th Japan Art Festival in Mexico. In 1979 Tsutaka travelled to New York to participate in an exhibition with Kenzō Okada and Tōkō Shinoda, which was shown in several cities in the US. Despite his international exhibitions and travels, Tsutaka remained strongly attached to his hometown Nishinomiya and the surrounding Kansai region until his death. He participated in an increasing number of prefectural and communal exhibitions such as the Hyogo Prefecture Art Exhibition and Nishinomiya City Art Exhibition, as well as in a great number of solo and group shows at art spaces and galleries particularly in Kobe, Osaka, and Kyoto.

Since 1960, Tsutaka's paintings shifted towards a more gestural and increasingly calligraphic style, which he would maintain until his death. The 1960s and 1970s also saw an expansion of mediums used by Tsutaka. Beginning in 1965, he included pottery and ceramic works in his exhibitions, followed by ink wash paintings, drawings, lithographs, and stone carving. Around 1979, he began using Japanese handmade washi paper for collages.

In 1962 Tsutaka held his first open-air exhibition of his works in the garden of his house in Nishinomiya, which were called Jiteiten (Exhibition in my garden), which was later renamed Taiwa no tame no sakuhin ten (Exhibition of works for the dialogue), and Kakū tsūshin ten (Communication of Imagination Exhibition) in 1976. These exhibitions, which ran for a day each in 1962 and 1963, or, since 1964 for about a week, were accompanied by events, symposiums, dance and music performances, and refreshments, with the aim of making art asseccible to the greater public and fostering free and open dialogue between people. This idea further developed into seminars and to the foundation of an organizational committee and eventually to the establishment of the open-air Kakū tsūshin tento ten (Communication of Imagination Tent Exhibition) at the Shukugawa River banks in Nishinomiya in 1980, which included performances, workshops, and site-specific works.

From 1968 to 1985, Tsutaka taught art as a professor at the Osaka University of Arts, and thereafter became an honorary professor. In his teaching Tsutaka encouraged his students to think about the relation between art and life, and he organized experimental field trips and exhibitions about the relation of art and everyday life spaces in the 1970s.

=== Late years ===
A recipient of the Nishinomiya Citizen Cultural Award in 1964, the Hyogo Prefecture Cultural Award in 1967, the Osaka Arts Prize in 1986, Tsutaka received the Kobe Shimbun Peace Award in 1991. Since the late 1980s, Tsutaka’ works were increasingly shown in larger-scaled solo exhibitions in the Hanshin region, e.g., at Tsukashin Hall in Amagasaki in 1987, at the Keihan Gallery of Arts and Sciences in Osaka in 1992, at the National Museum of Art, Osaka, in 1993, and, posthumously, at the Nishinomiya Ōtani Memorial Art Museum in 1996.

Tsutaka died in the Great Hanshin earthquake that occurred on January 17, 1995. He was found inanimate under the ruins of his house.

== Work ==
=== Painting ===
Although in the 1940s, Tsutaka chose painting over poetry as his main form of artistic expression, he continued to publish poems, e.g., in magazines such as Hi no tori and Tenbin (Scale), and to collaborate with poets throughout his life. He quoted poetry as a formative background and compared his clear and sparse visual language to poetry's efficient use of limited means of expression.

After an early phase in which he painted realist landscapes, Tsutaka gradually shifted to abstraction in the late 1940s. Around 1949, the human figures in his paintings were schematized in a Surrealist manner, reduced to their contour lines and placed before undefined plain backgrounds. His painting Boshi-zō (Mother with a Child) from 1951 exemplifies this development towards abstraction by further reducing the figures to contour lines and basic shapes, omitting any details such as faces and reducing the background to an atmospheric monochrome, resulting in the highlighting of the figures' gestures. With Maisō (Burial) from 1952, Tsutaka ultimately omitted any figurative elements, he created a geometric structure composed of vigorously painted broad lines in black and yellow.

Between 1956 and 1959, Tsutaka experimented with the planeness of his painted lines and created rhythmic arrangements of geometric shapes and the lines emerging from the application of paint, yet since around 1960, his paintings adapted a more calligraphic style. He created compositions of broad dark blue and black lines of oil paint, which he applied in dynamic, energetic movements, with spontaneous elements such as splashes. Tsutaka's changes of color palette has been traced back to his impressions of Inka ruins he saw while travelling Latin America in 1959. Between 1962 and 1966 Tsutaka introduced the application of liquid paint on the canvas with syringes, which resulted in a new variety of shades and gradations of soaked fine lines. In the following decades Tsutaka's paintings combined techniques and materials from previous decades.

Tsutaka's works are characterized by a pointed use of few colors. He often chose black and white for purity and clarity and reduced the color palette to increase depth. While he almost always painted with oil paints on canvas – there are a few works in oil on wood or glass – throughout his life, Tsutaka continued to experiment with methods and tools of paint application in addition to brushes, such as painting knives and cloth. With his reduced, simple visual language, Tsutaka's paintings stood out against gestural and expressive abstract and action paintings of the 1950s.

=== Pottery ===
In 1965 Tsutaka began showing pottery works in his exhibitions. These pieces, made of Shiragaki clay, included dark or color-glazed ceramic plates (tōban), into which abstract compositions with lines, circles and notches were scratched.

=== Ink wash paintings and watercolor ===
Tsutaka expanded his experimentation with painted lines to ink wash painting, which offered a different range of tonalities and shades of lines than oil on canvas painting. His first exhibition of ink wash paintings took place in 1967. His watercolors also explored the passages between painted lines, blots, and geometric forms.

=== Drawings, prints, illustrations ===
Tsutaka also created drawings, lithographs and copper plate prints. His first exhibition of lithographs was held in 1972. In 1976 he published Kakū tsūshin, a volume of drawings. Together with Kyoto-based US-American poet Cid Corman, a close friend, Tsutaka published Any How, a collection of poems and drawings.

=== Stone carvings ===
Tsutaka's interest in stone became evident after his first trip to Latin America and Brazil in 1959. In 1972 he created stone sculptures contrasting the sensual organic forms shaped out of the top of square stone blocks.

=== Paper collages ===
Inspired by Jasper John's silver screen prints on handmade Japanese paper, which he saw during his travels to New York in 1979, Tsutaka began to experiment with Japanese washi paper, in particular Najio-kami produced in his hometown Nishinomiya, in his artistic production. He also used Wakasa washi, produced in Obama city in Fukui prefecture, for his collages, which combined the Wakasa paper with pieces of print media, lead and linen, often embossed or perforated, in abstract formal compositions using the wrinkles and folds in the papers as compositional elements.

=== Kakū tsūshin (Communication of imagination) ===
Tsutaka annually held open-air exhibitions of his works in the garden of his house in Nishinomiya. Entitled Taiwa no tame no sakuhin ten (Exhibition of works for the dialogue) from 1962 until 1981, these festival-like exhibitions were accompanied by discussions and symposions, music and dance performances, and refreshments. The exhibitions of 1977 and 1978 were entitled Kakū tsūshin sakuhin ten (Exhibition of communication of imagination works) and brought about the ideas for a Kakū tsūshin kairō (Communication of imagination corridor) and a Kakū tsūshin kōza (Communication of imagination seminar). In 1979 he held a Kaku tsūshin ten, and from 1979 to 1980 he published a two-issue periodical titled Kakū tsūshin.

The term Kakū tsūshin, made up by Tsutaka, was first used publicly by the artist in the title of his volume of drawings in 1976. It was never defined as a clear-cut concept by the artist, but was based on his understanding of art as extending beyond the activities or production of a single artist to a connection of society as a whole through art as part of everyday life.

Tsutaka founded an organizational committee which from 1980 to 1985 organized five annual outdoor art exhibitions entitled Kakū tsūshin tento ten (Communication of Imagination Tent Exhibition). For these exhibitions a huge tent (about 100 m length) was set up on the banks of the Shukugawa River for a week to facilitate the display of all kinds of works, including paintings, sculpture, installation and site-specific works, as well as performance art, and the presentation of music and poetry. Symposiums were held, too. Using the Shukugawa Park as venue and a tent as exhibition space, the exhibition opened up to a broader public, inviting passersby to drop by.

== Reception and legacy ==
Since the 1950s Tsutaka has been considered one of the leading Japanese abstract painters of his time, specifically one of the “pioneers of abstract painting in 20th century Japan”. Boshi-zō (Mother with a Child), shown at the 6th Kōdō Exhibition in 1951, was Tsutaka's first work that was publicly commended by the influential art critic Atsuo Imaizumi for the “new sentiment” it embodied. Imaizumi, who in 1952 criticized the intricateness and old-fashioned nature of the Japanese paintings presented at the Salon de Mai show in Paris, during the 7th Kōdō Exhibition later that year, continued to praise Tsutaka's abstract Maiso (Burial) and Kurai kisetsu (Dark Season) for their “brisk space and rhythm”.

Tsutaka's painting emerged in the context of the transcultural dynamics between US-American and European abstract gestural oil painting and calligraphy in the 1950s. Like his contemporaries Yoshihara or Suda, Tsutaka was one of the Japanese postwar abstract painters, who, in exchange with avant-garde calligraphers such as Shiryū Morita, developed their own ways of painting that engaged with the spiritual and material aspects of Japanese traditional arts, but remained committed to oil or acrylic on canvas painting. Tsutaka's interest in lines has led to an understanding of his works as calligraphy. Yet, Tsutaka used oil and acrylic paint on canvas and continuously explored the formal, textual, and material variety of lines on the canvas and how they were closely connected to their transitions to planar shapes on the surfaces. His paintings are also distinguished from the spontaneous and uncontrolled gestural abstract paintings by his thoroughly preconceived calm visual language and controlled and deliberately sparse use of material.

Tsutaka's paintings inspired Japanese-Brazilian painters such as Manabu Mabe and Tomie Ohtake in their transition from figuration to informal abstraction in the late 1950s.

Through the exhibitions held at his home, the various Kakū tsūshin projects, especially the Tent Exhibitions, and his teaching practice, Tsutaka explored the relationship between everyday life and art and promoted an open environment of communication through art in the Hanshin region, making a lasting impact on younger generations of artists from the region.

== Publications ==
- 動物の舌, with poems by Aki Tamotsu, n.p.: Okamoto Shobō, 1961.
- 美の生理: 造形言語と内蔵言語 / Tsutaka Art Workings, Kobe: Aki Tamotsu, 1965.
- File ’69, n.p.: Tenbin, 1969.
- 断簡集, Osaka: Yukawa Shobō, 1976.
- Any how, with poems by Cid Corman, n.p.: Kisetsusha, 1976.
- Lithographs by Waichi Tsutaka, 1976.
- 架空通信, n.p.: Shoshi kisetsusha, 1976.
- 騙された時間: 画と論, Nagoya: Shoshi kisetsusha, 1978.
- 鳥の眼: 詩画集, Takatsuki: Shoshi Kisetsusha, 1986.
- 余白: 津高和一・作品とエッセイ, Niigata: Hakushindō, 1987.
- 津高和一作品集: もうひとつのコスモス / The Works of Waichi Tsutaka: Another Cosmos, n.p.: Tsutaka Waichi Sakuhin Kankōkai,1987.
- 抽象絵画を語る, Osaka: Osaka Prefectural Government, 1990.
