= Toyama Prefectural Museum of Art and Design =

Museum in Toyama, Toyama, Japan

- 富山県美術館
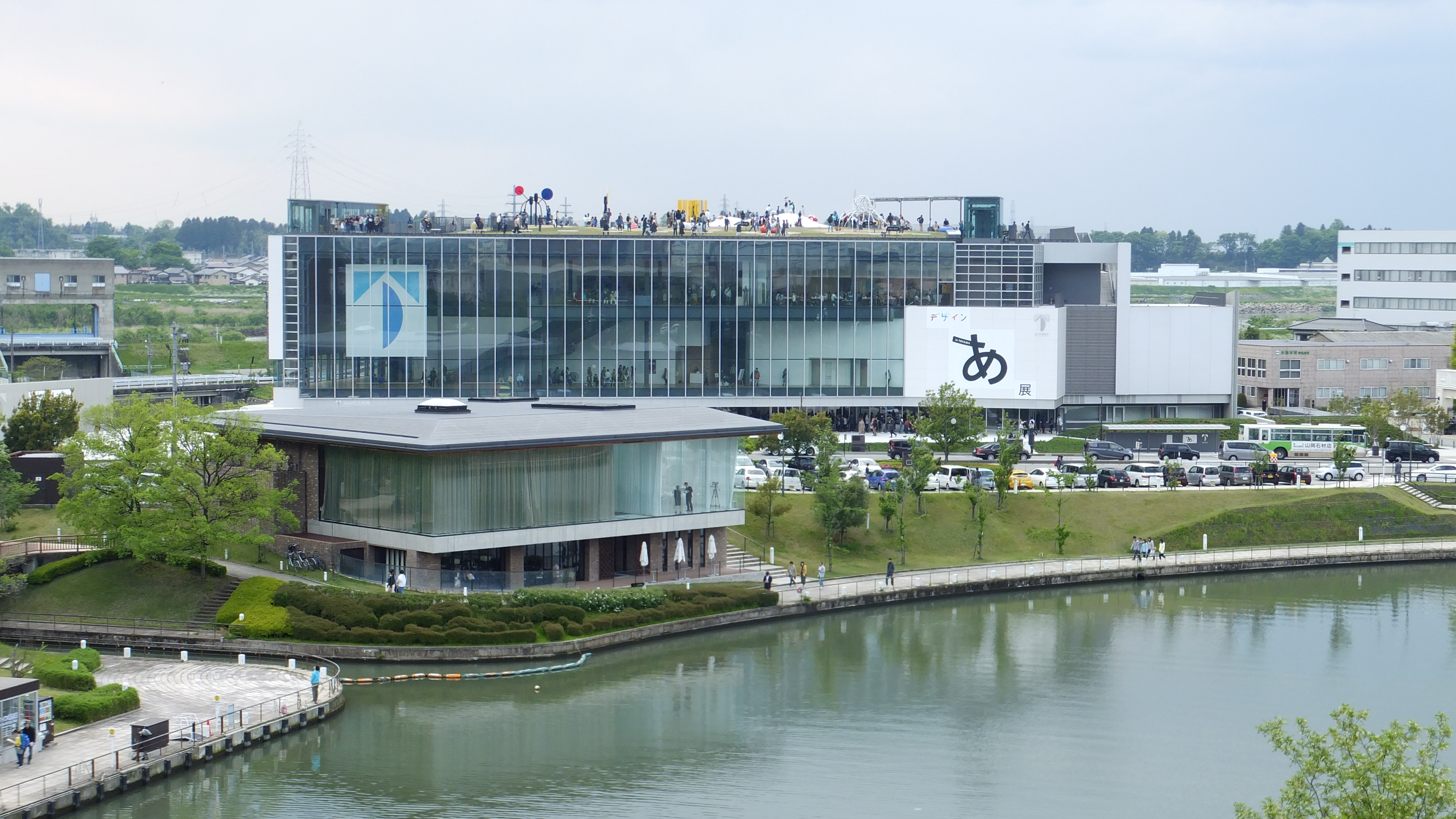
- Interactive map of the Toyama Prefectural Museum of Art and Design area

General information
- Location: 3-20 Kiba-machi, Toyama, Toyama Prefecture, Japan
- Coordinates: 36°42′38″N 137°12′36″E
- Opened: 25 March 2017 (partial); 26 August 2017 (full)

Technical details
- Floor count: 3
- Floor area: 14,990 m^{2} (161,400 sq ft)

Design and construction
- Architect: Naitō Hiroshi

Website
- Official website

Toyama Prefectural Museum of Art and Design (富山県美術館, Toyama-ken Bijutsukan) opened in Toyama, Toyama Prefecture, Japan in 2017, superseding and replacing the former Museum of Modern Art, Toyama (1981–2016). The collection combines 20th- and 21st-century art with design, and includes works by Pablo Picasso, Joan Miró, and Munakata Shikō, as well as posters and chairs.

== See also ==
- Toyama Science Museum
- Toyama Castle
- Ōzuka-Senbōyama Sites
