= Death during consensual sex =

Circumstance of death

Death can occur during sexual intercourse for a number of reasons, generally because of the physical strain of the activity, or because of unusual extenuating circumstances. There are various euphemisms for death during sex, including "dying in the saddle" or the French "la mort d'amour" (lit. 'death of love').

== Health and physiology ==
Sexual intimacy, as well as orgasms, increases levels of the hormone oxytocin, also known as "the love hormone", which helps people bond and build trust. Sexual activity is also known as one of many mood repair strategies, which means it can be used to help dissipate feelings of sadness or depression.

A 2011 meta-analysis in JAMA found that each additional hour of sexual activity per week resulted in an increased risk of 2–3 myocardial infarctions and one sudden cardiac death [SCD] per 10,000 person-years. Sexual intercourse can also trigger a subarachnoid hemorrhage via the Valsalva maneuver. A 2011 meta-analysis published in Journal of Sexual Medicine found that men who were unfaithful were significantly more likely than those who were faithful to experience severe or fatal cardiac events during sex. Basilar artery dissection has also been reported in connection with sexual activity, though most sexual headaches are benign in nature.

Deaths during consensual sex account for approximately 0.6% of all sudden deaths. In the UK, of all people under 50 who suffered SCD, 0.2% did so within an hour of sex. Sildenafil, although generally considered to be a safe drug, has been linked to SCD during sexual activity among elderly or otherwise infirm men. A number of deaths during consensual sex have been linked to the use of other prescription or recreational drugs, such as cocaine. The majority of deaths due to cardiovascular causes during sex occur in males.

The heart condition endothelial dysfunction is a contributing cause to both atherosclerosis and erectile dysfunction. Because of the link between these conditions, rates of coronary artery disease are higher among patients with erectile dysfunction. One treatment for erectile dysfunction is cGMP-specific phosphodiesterase type 5 inhibitors, which enable patients to resume having sex despite having a cardiac condition, by lowering blood pressure. These drugs, including sildenafil, inhibit the action of the phosphodiesterase, allowing for a higher concentration of cyclic guanosine monophosphate in the penis when it is physically stimulated. Cyclic guanosine monophosphate is a second messenger in the nitric oxide pathway, responsible for erections via the vasodilating function of nitric oxide. Sudden cardiac death can be caused by myocardial ischemia, and the physical activity of sexual intercourse in patients with coronary artery disease can result in myocardial ischemia. The phosphodiesterase can act as a potentiator for other drugs which lower blood pressure and which could be used to treat heart conditions, and so may be contraindicated to prevent negative health consequences.

== Notable cases ==
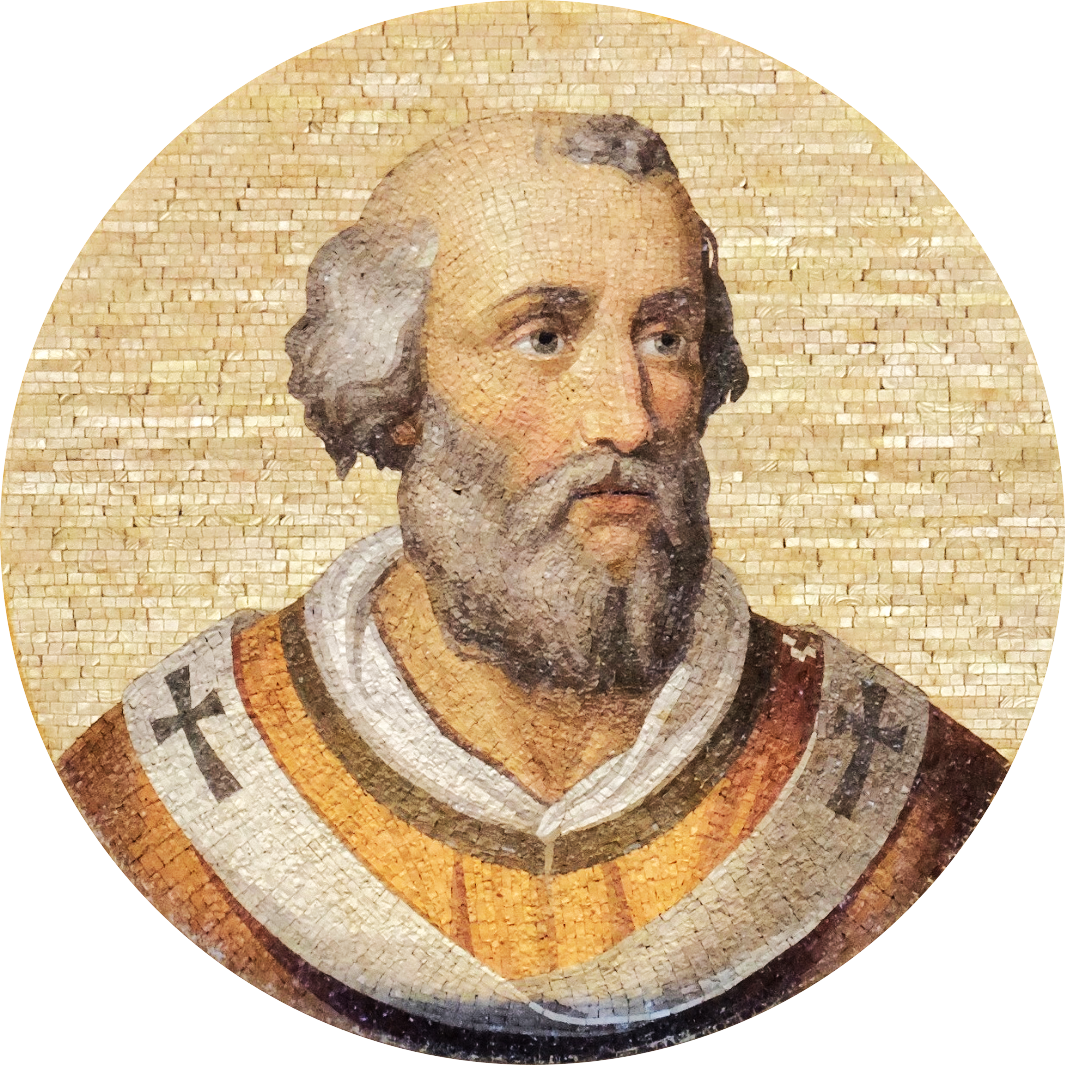
Pope John XII (d. 964), who may have died during consensual sex with a mistress

- Pope John XII died on 14 May 964; one story relates that he died of a paralytic stroke suffered while having sex with a woman named Stefanetta. He may have died instead when the woman's husband defenestrated John or beat him to death with a hammer during the act.
- Lord Palmerston, Prime Minister of the United Kingdom, died in 1865 following a brief illness; sources disagree about the immediate circumstances of his death. It is rumored that sex on a billiard table with a maid precipitated his demise, but this account is disputed, with other sources stating that he died of pneumonia.
- Félix Faure, president of France from 1895 to 1899, is widely reported to have died while receiving fellatio from his mistress, Marguerite Steinheil. The cause of death was listed as a cerebral hemorrhage. Eyewitnesses stated he was in a state of partial undress. This version is disputed by some historians.
- Nelson Rockefeller, former Vice President of the United States and heir to the Rockefeller family fortune, died in 1979 of a heart attack at age 70, rumored to be caused by an orgasm during intercourse with his secretary, Megan Marshack. According to New York magazine, a popular quip following his death was "Nelson thought he was coming, but he was going." Contemporaneous accounts of his death differed greatly and his hasty cremation left the exact cause of death uncertain.
- Japanese writer Isamu Togawa had heart failure in 1983 due to his chronic arrhythmia; according to Taro Maki, Togawa died during sexual intercourse in his hotel room. Togawa's younger brother, Itaru Kikumura, also said that Togawa died during sex, though this was denied by Tsuneo Watanabe.
- Sir Billy Snedden, Australian politician and former leader of the Liberal Party, "expired 'at the peak of physical congress' (as a policeman told Truth)" in 1987. Nineteen years later, his son (and lover of the same woman with whom Snedden was having sex at the time of his death) was quoted as saying, "I'm sure the old man went out happy—anyone would be proud to die on the job."
- In Romania in 1999, a man and a woman died of carbon monoxide poisoning while having sex in a car, which they had parked in a garage with the engine still running.
- In 2007, a man and woman, both 21, were discovered naked on an empty street in downtown Columbia, South Carolina, with multiple injuries resulting from a fall. Their clothes were later found on the roof of a four-story building adjacent to the road. Both died in the hospital after falling 50 ft (15 m) from the building.
- In 2008, a York County, Pennsylvania woman died when she was electrocuted by homemade nipple clamps, an example of an erotic electrostimulation practice. Her death was ruled a homicide.
- In 2009, an Atlanta Police Department officer died from atherosclerotic coronary artery disease while engaged in a threesome. His widow sued his doctor and was awarded a $3 million settlement, with the jury finding that the doctor did not properly diagnose and treat the police officer's pre-existing health issues.
- In 2013, a man and woman in Zimbabwe were having sex outdoors when they were attacked by a lion; the woman died.
- In 2018, a 29-year-old prostitute died in Saint Petersburg, Russia, after choking on a condom while performing fellatio on a man. The condom slipped off the client during the act and blocked the prostitute's airways.
- In 2020, a 35-year-old man collapsed and died in the company of a prostitute in Phalombe, Malawi. Local police, and later the general practitioner of the nearby Migowi health centre, examined his body and determined the cause of death to be "excessive orgasm, which caused blood vessels in the brain to rupture". Police said the sex worker would not be prosecuted, because she "committed no crime by being too sweet for the man".

== See also ==
- Autoerotic fatality
- Accidental deaths during erotic asphyxiation
- Rough sex murder defense
- Lists of unusual deaths
