= Isamu Yamamoto =

Japanese skateboarder

Personal information
- Nationality: Japanese
- Born: 26 April 2003 (age 23)

Sport
- Sport: Freestyle skateboarding

Isamu Yamamoto (Yamamoto Isamu 山本 勇; born 26 April 2003) is a Japanese world Freestyle skateboarding champion. At age fourteen, Yamamoto took first place at the World Freestyle Round-Up Skateboarding Championships in British Columbia, Canada. He was the first person to win the World Round-Up Freestyle Championships using two skateboards at the same time. He was the subject of the Brett Novak film ISAMU.

He did not compete in the 2020 Olympic Games in Tokyo, the first Olympic games to feature skateboarding because freestyle is not one of the two styles selected (street and park disciplines) to be part of the games by the International Olympic Committee.

He was inspired to start skating when his father Shoji (a former skateboarder) showed him videos of freestyle skateboarder Rodney Mullen, “He is the reason. He inspired me and made me start”. Yamamoto learned to skate in skateparks in Nara. On Yamamoto, Mullen said:

The way he links his tricks together and the speed of them – it’s beautiful to watch, I would dare say that not many could do that, in that way, if they tried. Isamu is one of the most impressive freestyle skaters of his generation
