= Toyama Science Museum =

- 富山市科学博物館
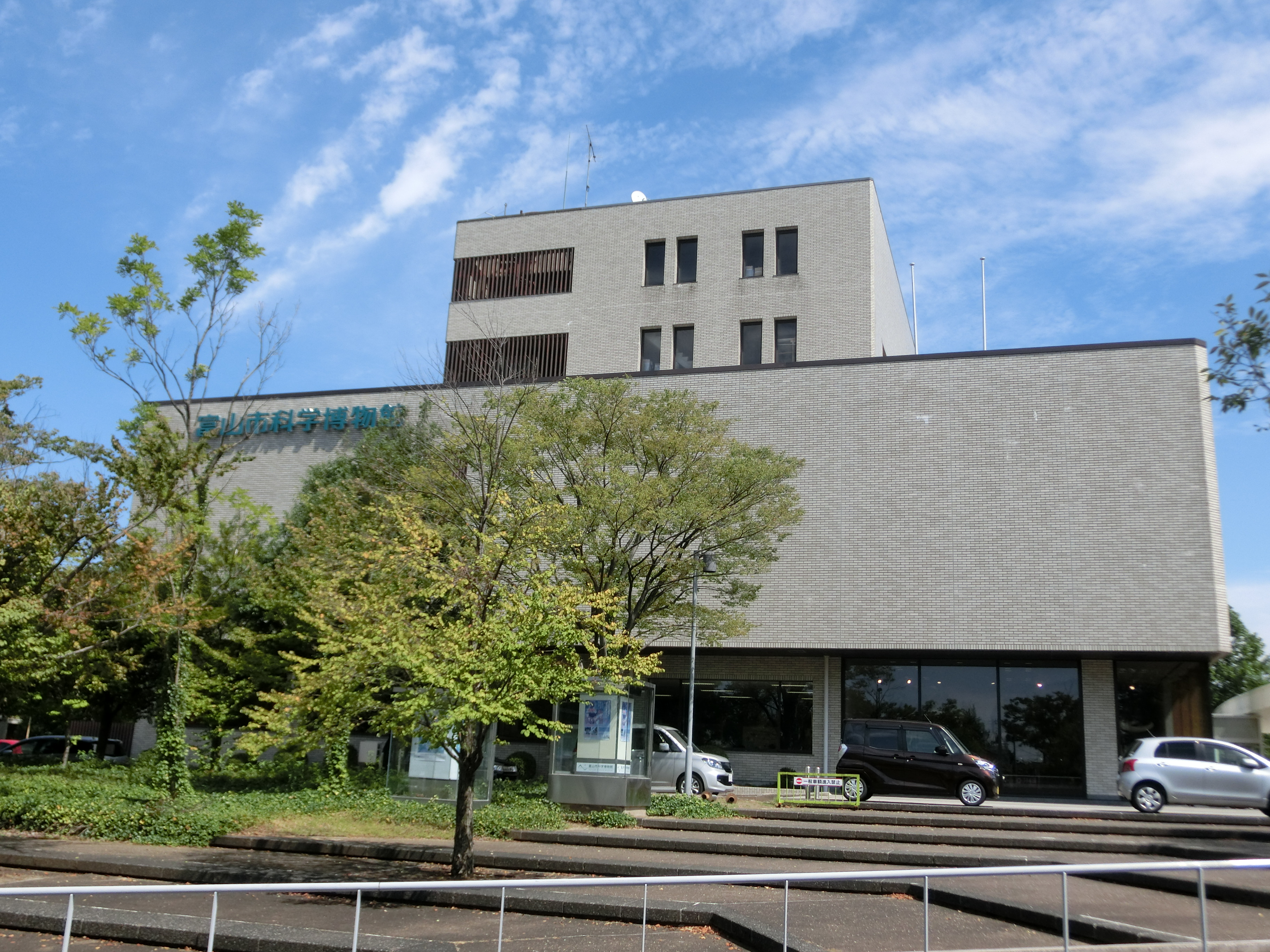
- Toyama Science Museum
- Interactive map of the Toyama Science Museum area

General information
- Location: 1-8-31 Nishinakano-machi, Toyama, Toyama Prefecture, Japan
- Coordinates: 36°40′52″N 137°12′42″E
- Opened: 23 October 1979

Website
- Official website

Toyama Science Museum (富山市科学博物館, Toyama-shi Kagaku Hakubutsukan) is a museum located in Toyama, Toyama Prefecture, Japan.

== History ==
The museum first opened in 1979 as the Toyama City Science and Culture Center (富山市科学文化センター). The Museum reopened in its current guise after renewal in 2007.

== Collection ==
The museum collects, preserves, researches, and displays materials relating to the natural history of the area. There is also a planetarium.

== Publications ==
- Bulletin of the Toyama Science Museum (富山市科学博物館研究報告 previously 富山市科学文化センター研究報告) (1979—)

== See also ==
- Museum of Modern Art, Toyama
- Botanic Gardens of Toyama
- Toyama Castle
