= Musée Tomo =

Museum for contemporary Japanese ceramic art

Coordinates: 35°39′58″N 139°44′41″E

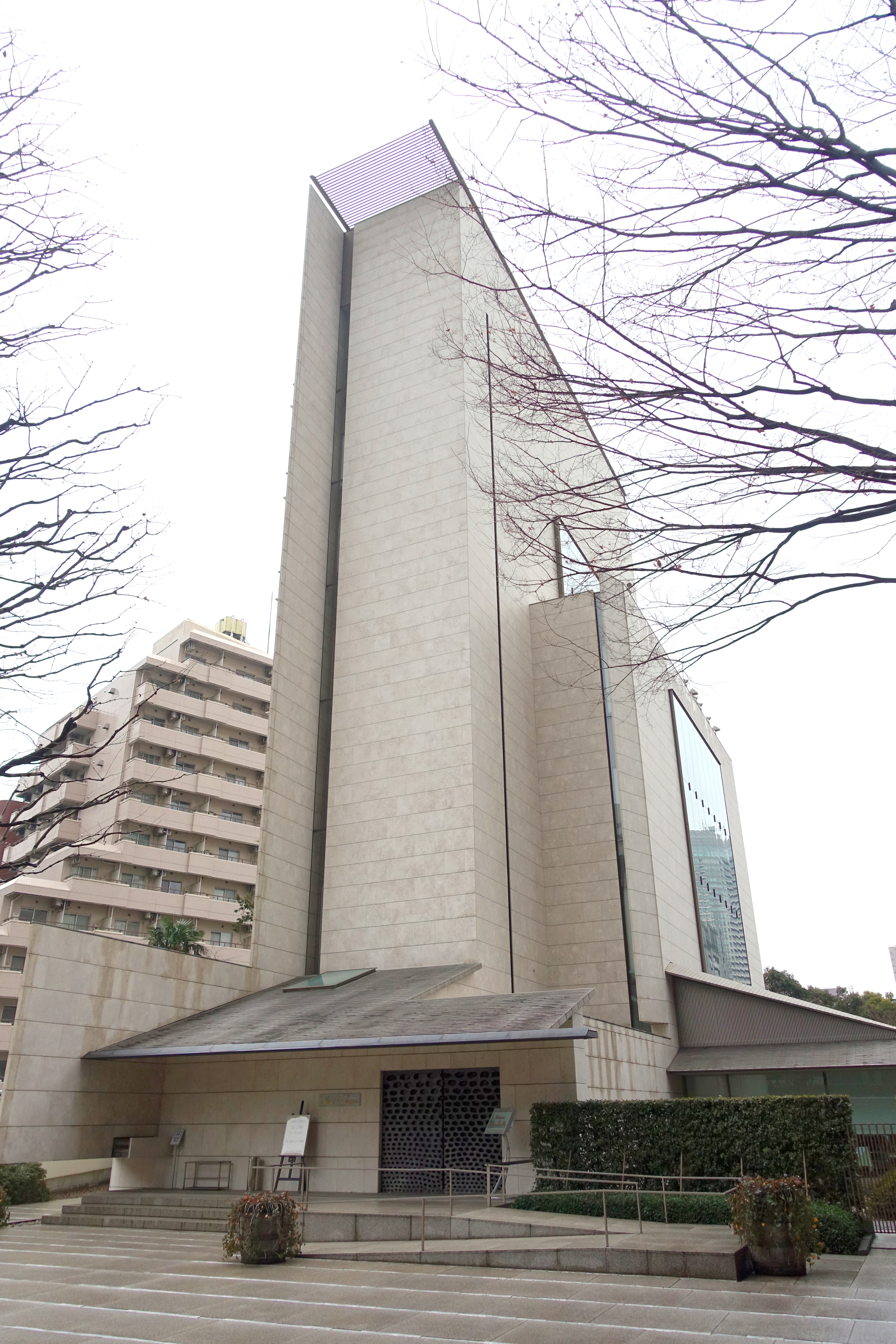
Musée Tomo

Musée Tomo (now the Kikuchi Kanjitsu Memorial Tomo Museum) is a museum for contemporary Japanese ceramic art, located at 4-1-35 Toranomon, Minato, Tokyo, Japan, featuring the collection of Madame Tomo Kikuchi.

== Publications ==
The museum and the Kikuchi Foundation has published a number of books about its collection and special exhibitions:

- Tomo Collection (2006)
- Japanese Ceramics Today, Part 1: Masterworks From The Kikuchi Collection (2003)
- Kawase Shinobu: Fifty Years of Celadon Making (2018)
- Fujimoto Yoshimichi: The Centennial of the Birth of a Master of Overglaze Enamels on Porcelain (2019)
- Takashi Nakazato: A Journey Through Clay (2021)
- Koji Hatakeyama: Founding Worlds of Bronze (2022)
- Togei in the Progressive Form (2023)
