= Museum of Fine Arts, Gifu =

Coordinates: 35.401309°N 136.730221°E

Museum of Fine Arts, Gifu 岐阜県美術館
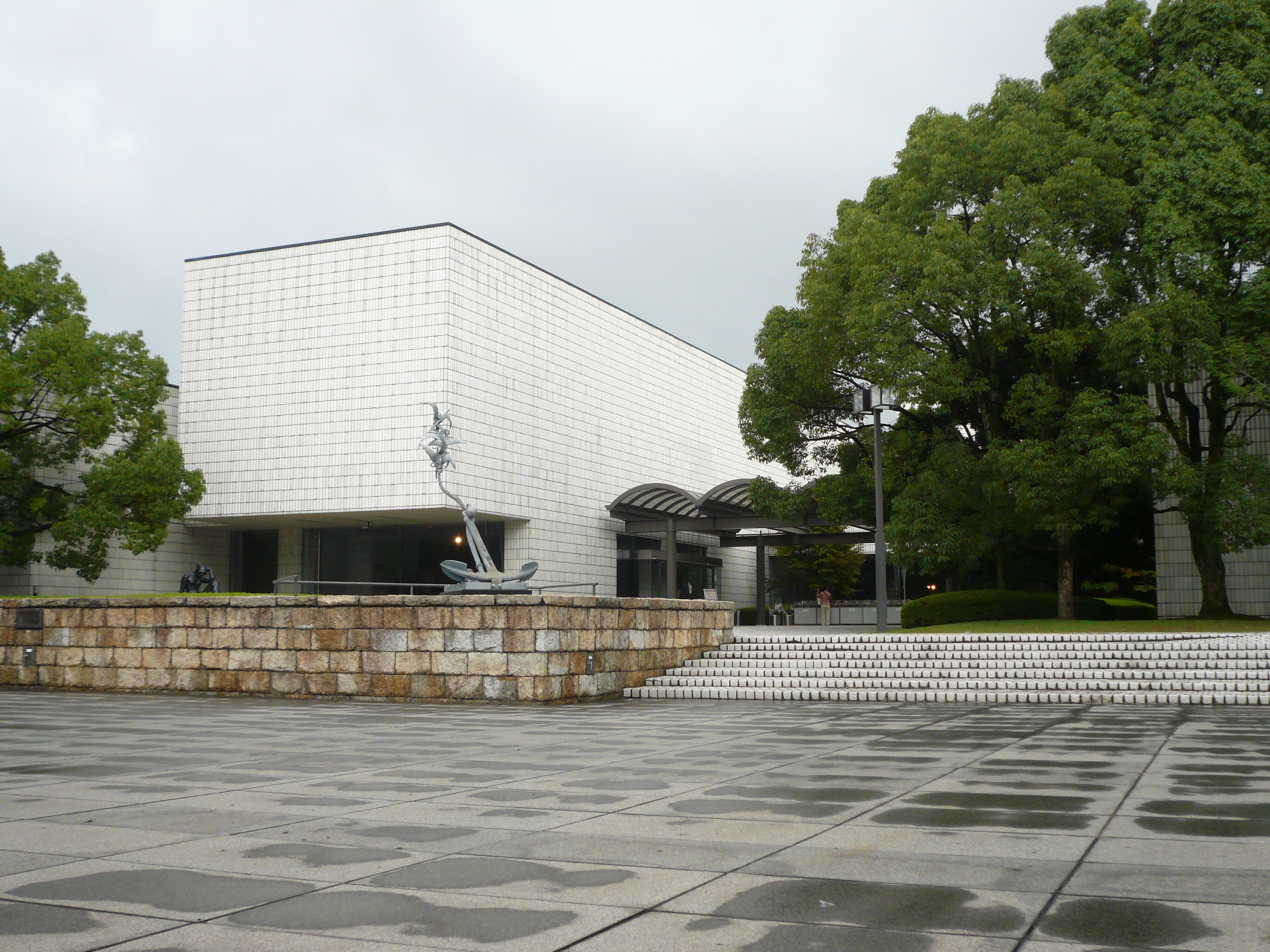
- Established: November 3, 1982
- Location: 4-1-22 Usa, Gifu; Gifu Prefecture, Japan
- Type: Art museum
- Public transit access: Gifu Bus Kanō Danchi Line towards Ichibashi at either JR Gifu Station or Meitetsu Gifu Station and get off at Gifu-ken Bijutsukan.
- Website: Gifu Prefectural Art Museum

The Museum of Fine Arts, Gifu (岐阜県美術館, Gifu-ken Bijutsukan) is art museum located in the city of Gifu, Gifu Prefecture, Japan. The focus of the museum is on art and artists related to Gifu Prefecture, but the museum also collects pieces from other places in Japan and overseas.
