= Isamu Masuda =

Japanese physician

- Born: December 25, 1872; Aomori Prefecture
- Died: March 10, 1945 (aged 72); Tokyo, Japan
- Cause of death: Air raid
- Occupation: Physician
- Known for: Writing a book Leprosy and Social Problems openly criticizing the Government policy of segregation of leprosy patients in 1907

Isamu Masuda (増田 勇, Masuda Isamu; December 25, 1872 – March 10, 1945) was a pioneering Japanese physician who studied the treatment of leprosy. Studying in Aomori and Yokohama in his hospital, he wrote a book Leprosy and Social Problems in 1907, the year of the promulgation of the first leprosy law, and openly criticized the crucial segregation policy. He advocated the nation's involvement in the discovery of treatments of leprosy, since he believed that it was curable.

== Personal history ==
He was born on November 25, 1872, in Kuradatemura (now Owanimachi) Aomori Prefecture. After graduation from Tokyo Saisei Gakusha, a private medical school, in 1898 he studied leprosy in Aomori Prefecture at Masuda Hospital where his brother was practicing. In 1904, he presented two patients who recovered with his treatment before a medical meeting in Aomori. In 1906 he moved to Yokohama and studied the treatment of leprosy. In 1907, he published "Leprosy and Social Problems" and criticized the 1907 segregation leprosy prevention law. In 1913, he moved to Asakusa, Tokyo and specialized in venereal disease. In 1945, he died amid the great Tokyo air raid.

== Presentation of Patients before a meeting ==
A newspaper ToOo Nippou, recorded his presentation. After the general meeting of Aomori Prefecture Physicians in the morning, "Isamu Masuda presented two patients who recovered well with his remedy and told them the story of his treatment."

== Leprosy and social problems ==
From Aomori he moved to Yokohama, where leprosy patients gathered. He studied leprosy patients while practicing dermatology and venereology. In 1907 he published the results of his studies and his opinions in Leprosy and Social Problems. Based on his experiences, he firmly believed that leprosy was curable, and he was against indiscriminate segregation. The leprosy policy should be based on humanity and the state should order that specialists study the treatments of leprosy. Patients may be willing to be hospitalized if leprosy will be curable within 5 years. His opinions were not accepted by the Government and the publication of his book was impossible. Only one copy was left in the National Diet Library.

== His Remedy ==
His remedy was from plants and was served in powder and injections. Because his remedy was not perfect, he did not make his medicine public. He wrote that 34 out of 100 patients recovered. Kitasato Shibasaburō, a noted physician of his time, reported that only 4 cured and 15 almost cured out of 233 patients, according to Leprosy and Social Problems.

== Photographs ==
He sent Hannah Riddell an album of patients in his Yokohama days. The album was discovered in the Kaishun Byoin but Hannah Riddell did not respond to Masuda.

== Comments on Masuda ==
Yutaka Fujino cited his book first and commented favourably about his opinions. Ichiro Kikuchi introduced his book and showed some photographs. Minoru Narita threw some doubt on the results of his remedy, but wrote that Masuda was indirectly against segregation.
