= Sachio Otani =

Japanese architect

- Born: February 20, 1924; Japan, Tokyo
- Died: January 2, 2013 (aged 88)
- Other name: 大谷 幸夫
- Occupation: architect

Sachio Otani (大谷 幸夫, Ōtani Sachio; February 20, 1924 – January 2, 2013) was a noted Japanese architect.

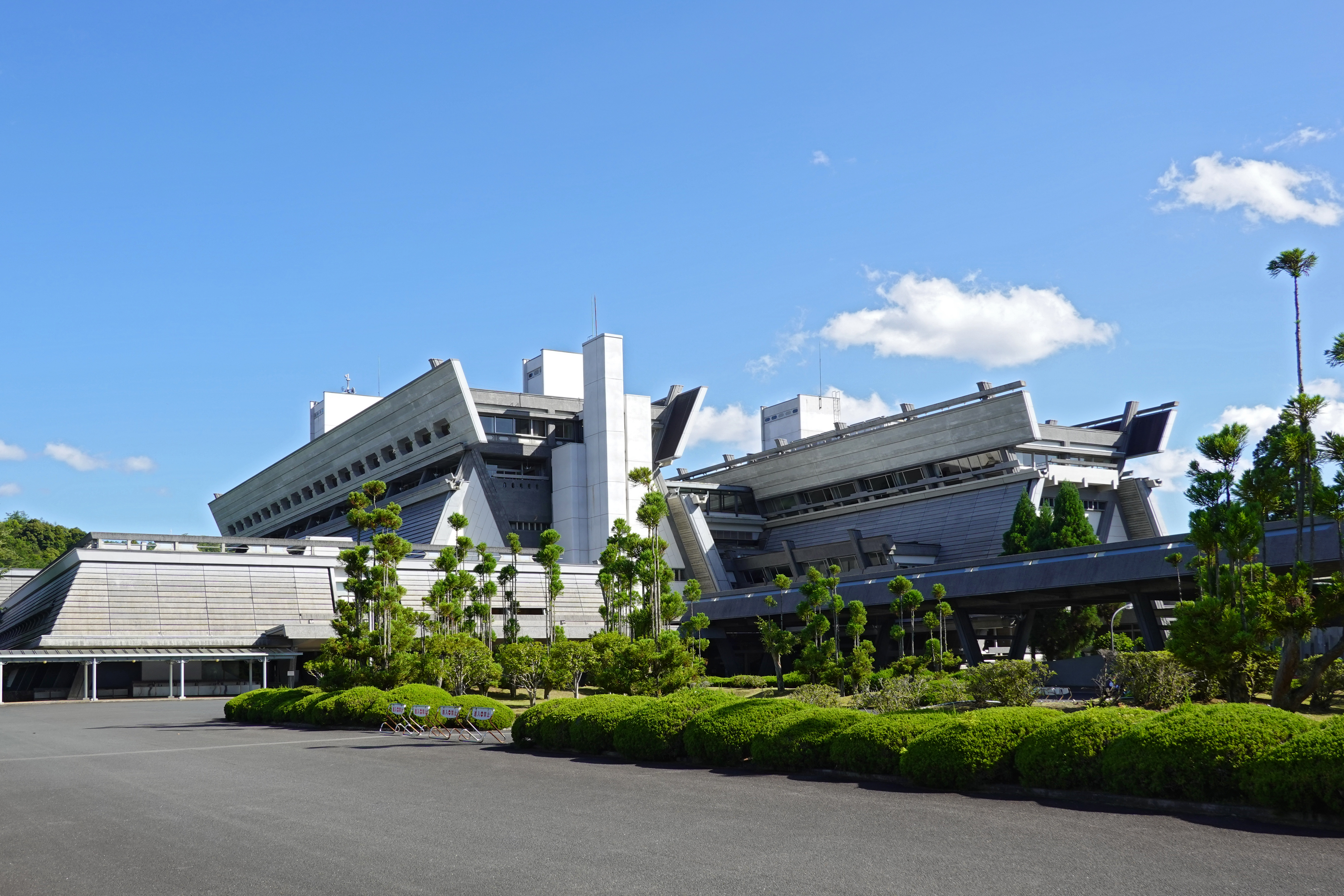
Kyoto International Conference Center

== Biography ==
Otani was born in Tokyo, and in 1946 graduated from the University of Tokyo. He began his career in Kenzo Tange's studio, where he helped design the Hiroshima Peace Memorial Museum (1955). In 1960 he started his own practice, and has subsequently designed a number of memorable buildings including the Tokyo Children's Cultural Center (1964), Kyoto International Conference Center (1966), the Kanazawa Institute of Technology (1969), and the Kawaramachi housing project in Kawasaki, Kanagawa (1970).
