= Isamu Togawa =

Japanese writer and political commentator

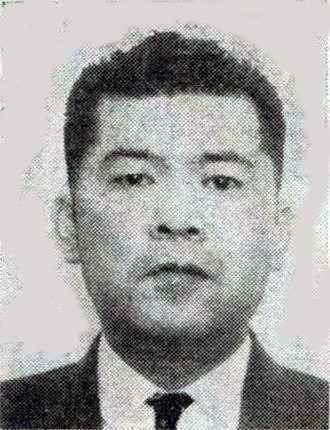
Togawa in 1967

Isamu Togawa (戸川猪佐武, Togawa Isamu; 16 December 1923 – 19 March 1983) was a Japanese writer and political commentator. Togawa was born in the city of Hiratsuka in Kanagawa Prefecture. His father was a novelist and former mayor of Hiratsuka Sadao Togawa and his younger brother was the novelist Itaru Kikumura.

== Life and career ==
After graduating from Shonan Secondary, now Kanagawa Prefectural Shonan High School, he enrolled in the Faculty of Politics and Economics at Waseda University. Afterwards he was called up to serve in the army, but was found to be ill during the physical exam and received a temporary deferment. He was called up again after recovering but the war ended soon after so he returned to his studies at Waseda and graduated.

He joined Yomiuri Shimbun in 1947. As a reporter in the newspaper's politics division he became a familiar face in Japan through his many interviews with politicians. He also stayed in Moscow for a time as a special correspondent. In 1955 he acted as an intermediary between his father Sadao and Kenzo Kono, an LDP member of the House of Councillors who had asked Isamu to persuade his father to run in the Hiratsuka mayoral election. Isamu succeeded in getting his father elected. He left Yomiuri Shimbun in 1962 to do political writing. In addition, he served as anchor for JNN News Scope, a TBS news program that started in October 1962.

Before long he entered politics himself like his father, running as an independent candidate for his hometown in Kanagawa's 3rd District during the general elections of November 1963. However, he lost election with only 19,871 votes, not enough to qualify to get his candidate registration fee refunded. After that he concentrated on his political writing. He established his literary reputation as a member of the Togawa family through his bestselling non-fiction political novel Shōsetsu Yoshida Gakkō ("The Yoshida School: A Novel"), the inside story of the world of conservative politics in Japan. By the time of Isamu Togawa's death it was an eight-volume work extending from Shigeru Yoshida's first term as prime minister up to the government of Zenko Suzuki. He also wrote companion volumes such as Shōsetsu Yoshida Shigeru ("Shigeru Yoshida: A Novel") and Shōsetsu Miki Bukichi ("Bukichi Miki: A Novel") that delved even more deeply into this subject.

Togawa, who had an office in New Japan Hotel, is also known for playing a central role in negotiations on collective compensation for the devastating 1982 fire there which left 33 dead.

== Writings ==
In his political commentary, he consistently defended the conservative establishment of the Liberal Democratic Party due to the personal relationships he had built up with them from his time as a reporter. He wrote extensive commentary on those who served as prime minister, and towards the end of his life had close ties with Kakuei Tanaka. In particular, due to his ties to his home prefecture, it was understood that he was very close with the Kono family of politicians, including Kenzo Kono and Ichiro Kono, who were also from Kanagawa, and Shigeru Yoshida who resided in Oiso after retiring from politics.

On the other hand, he portrayed politicians of the "bureaucratic" type like Eisaku Satō and Mamoru Shigemitsu in a less favorable light.

Togawa's works that were labelled as "novels" were actually all non-fiction that followed the historical facts scrupulously. Togawa said "I chose the form of a novel rather than taking it upon myself to write a critical biography. Politicians are people whose behavioral patterns are controlled by their character and personality. Thus, by depicting what kind of person they are we can understand for the first time the fact that they did what they did because of who they are."

== Death ==
On 18 March 1983 Togawa attended a preview of the new film adaptation of "The Yoshida School: A Novel" and a party hosted by Noboru Takeshita, and soon after, before daybreak on 19 March, he died suddenly. He was 59 years old. The then Prime Minister Yasuhiro Nakasone hurried to his wake and at his funeral Kakuei Tanaka gave a eulogy written by Taro Maki, a journalist who was referred to as Isamu Togawa's only disciple.

According to news coverage at the time, after Togawa had gotten back to his hotel where his office was he suddenly fell ill. The woman who was staying in his hotel room called emergency and though the response team rushed to the scene and administered first aid, he could not be resuscitated and died there. At first, the cause of death was reported as an intracranial hemorrhage but then it was announced to be heart failure due to his chronic arrhythmia. According to Taro Maki, Togawa died during sexual intercourse at his hotel room. Togawa's younger brother Itaru Kikumura also acknowledged in contemporary interviews with the magazines Shukan Shincho and Shukan Bunshun that Togawa died during sex, though this theory was denied by Tsuneo Watanabe, a journalist at Yomiuri Shimbun.

== Works ==
- 昭和現代史 激動する戦後期の記録 光文社, 1959 (カッパ・ブックス)
- 『戦後風俗史-ろうそくからテレビへ 廃墟から生活革命へ』雪華社、1960
- 政治資金 政界の地下水道をさぐる 内田老鶴圃 1961
- 昭和外交史 雪華社, 1962 「昭和外交五十年」角川文庫
- 競争に強くなる本 ビジネスマン 実業之日本社, 1963 (実日新書)
- 日本を動かすイデオロギー 北岡勲共著 文教書院, 1964
- 『日本の首相』講談社, 1964 (ミリオン・ブックス)
- ビジネスに勝つ19の条件 実業之日本社, 1965 (実日新書)
- 『前進する公明党』フェイス出版, 1966
- 『現代の死角永田町』20世紀社, 1966.
- 『保守を支える人々』民族と政治社, 1967
- 魅力ある政治家 文理書院ドリーム出版, 1968 (ドリーム新書)
- 『保守人材論』民族と政治社, 1969
- 『首相官邸三十九人の内幕』自由国民社, 1969
- 人使いアイデア集 ウーム,これはうまい ベストセラーズ, 1969
- 近代政治家伝 日本を築いた人びと 有竹修二,中正雄共著 永田書房, 1971
- 3年後の日本を見る 政治と経済はどう変っていくか 日本文芸社, 1971
- 『小説吉田学校』流動、1971 のち角川文庫、学陽文庫
- 燃えつきた スカルノ 濤書房, 1971
- 『陥された閣僚』実業之日本社, 1971(ホリデー・フィクション)
- 『総理田中角栄-この日本をどうする』（編）講談社, 1972
- 『田中角栄猛語録』昭文社出版部, 1972
- 『総理大臣の椅子』双葉社, 1972
- 政治家 国を左右する人間の虚像と実像 双葉社, 1972 のち角川文庫
- 巷談・田中角栄 鶴書房
- 『田中角栄伝-その土着と大衆性の軌跡』鶴書房, 1972
- 『小説党人山脈』流動, 1972 「小説吉田学校 第2部」
- 『角栄軍団-その形成過程と組織を点検する』サニー出版, 1972
- 『昭和外交五十年』学芸書林, 1973
- 『自民党の危機-民主連合政権に勝てるか』学芸書林, 1973
- 『日の丸と赤い星-日ソ交渉100年の裏面』双葉社, 1973
- 『日本政治の展望ーこれからどうなる!緊急事態に備えて』日本文芸社, 1974
- 『共産党よ、驕るなかれ-仮面に隠された矛盾を衝く』サンケイ新聞社出版局, 1974
- 小説吉田学校 第3部 流動, 1974
- 『小説自民党対共産党』太陽, 1974 のち角川文庫
- 『政権争奪』サンケイ新聞社出版局, 1975 のち角川文庫
- 小説吉田学校 第4部 流動, 1975
- 『河野一族-一郎,謙三,洋平-その反骨の系譜』サンケイ出版, 1976
- 『政客よ舞え』流動, 1976–77
- 陰謀の軌跡 昭和の内幕 エルム, 1976
- 『現代の新興宗教-信者30,000,000人』太陽, 1976
- 小説吉田小学校 第5部 流動, 1977
- 素顔の昭和 光文社, 1978 のち角川文庫
- 小説吉田学校 第6部 流動出版, 1979
- 『悪の社会学-政・財・官界実力者の条件』三天書房, 1979 のち角川文庫
- 小説吉田学校 第7部 流動出版, 1980
- 『君は田中角栄になれるか』山手書房, 1980
- 日本の地方銀行 光文社, 1981
- 党人の群れ 第1-3部 角川文庫, 1981
- 『小説吉田茂』角川書店, 1981 のち文庫
- 『小説永田町の争闘』毎日新聞社, 1982 のち角川文庫
- 『昭和の宰相』1-8巻 講談社, 1982 のち文庫
- 『小説三木武吉』角川書店, 1983 のち文庫
- 『新・小説永田町の争闘』毎日新聞社, 1983

== See also ==
- Liberal Democratic Party (Japan)
