= Isamu Kenmochi =

Japanese industrial designer

- 剣持勇
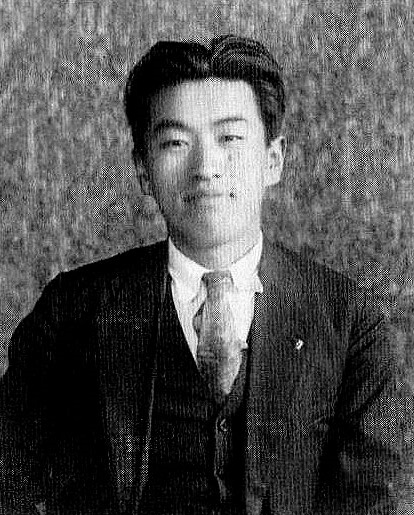
- Born: 2 January 1912; Tokyo
- Died: 3 June 1971 (aged 59); Shinjuku, Tokyo
- Education: Chiba University
- Awards: G-Mark Prize (Good Design); Mainichi Design Prize

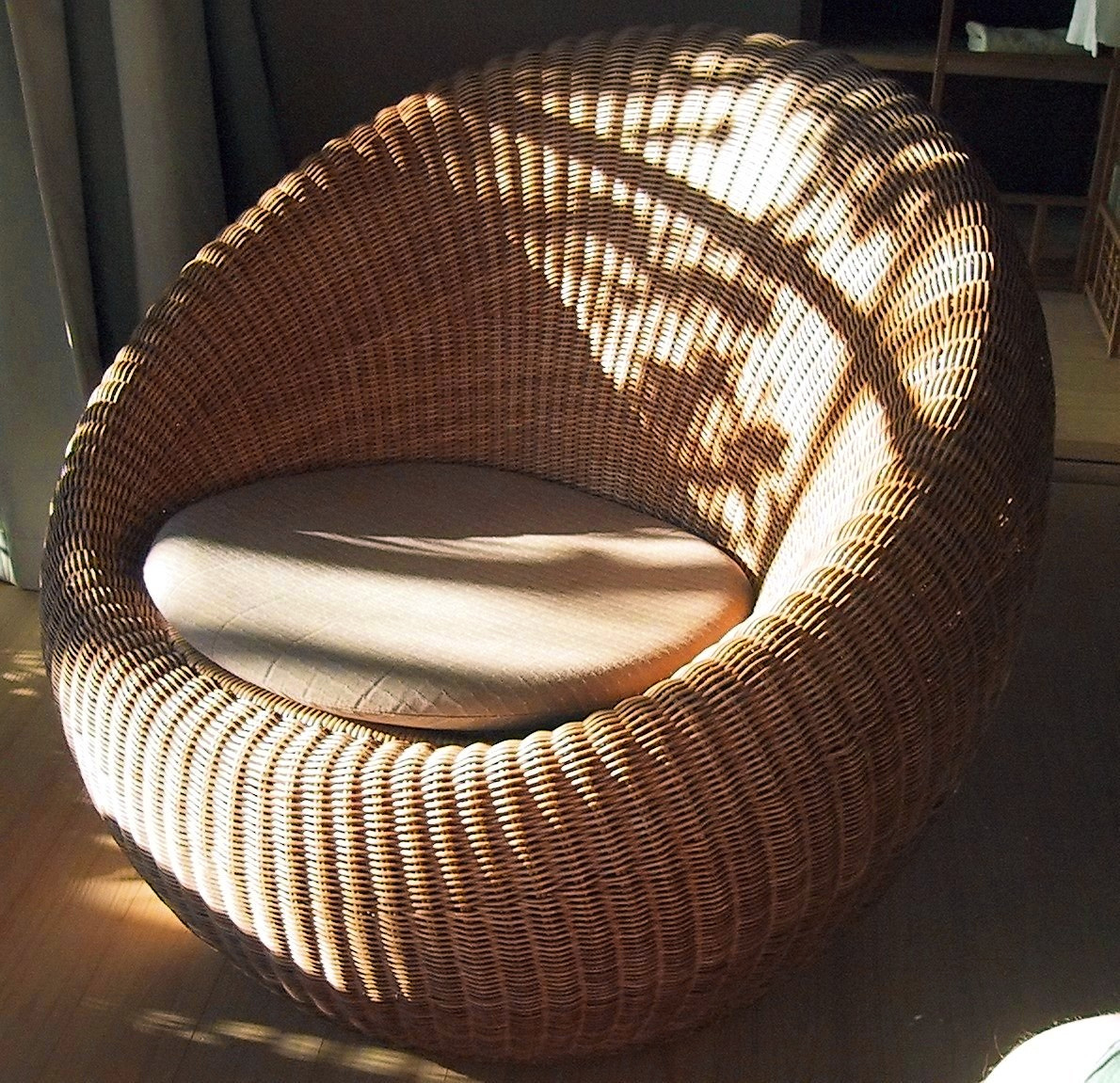
Round Rattan Chair (1960)

Isamu Kenmochi (Japanese: 剣持勇, 1912 - 1971) was a Japanese modernist designer significant in the development of Japanese industrial design after World War II.

Isamu Kenmochi was born on 2 January 1912 in Tokyo. Kenmochi graduated from the Tokyo College of Industrial Arts (Japanese: 東京高等工芸学校, now Chiba University Faculty of Engineering) in 1932. After his graduation, Kenmochi worked at the Industrial Arts Research Institute in Tokyo.

Kenmochi met artist and designer Isamu Noguchi in the summer of 1950 on Noguchi's first trip to Japan. Together, the two developed a number of furniture designs, pioneering the Japanese Modern style which integrated the material culture of Japanese furniture with modernist styles.

In 1952, Kenmochi visited the United States, later writing about the visit in the Industrial Arts Research Institute's publication, Kogei Nyusu. Later that year, Kenmochi became a founding member of the Japan Industrial Designers Association.

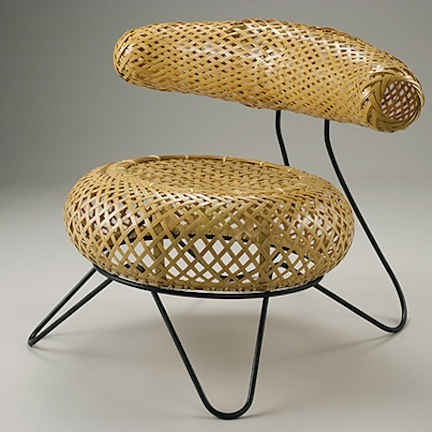
Basket Chair by Isamu Kenmochi and Isamu Noguchi

In 1964, Kenmochi's 1958 design for a lounge chair commissioned by the Yamakawa Rattan Company was added to the design collection of the MoMA. The design additionally won the G-Mark Prize (Good Design Selection System).

Kenmochi died by suicide on 3 June 1971 in Shinjuku, Tokyo.
