= Museum of Modern Art, Toyama =

Coordinates: 36°40′48.5″N 137°12′46″E

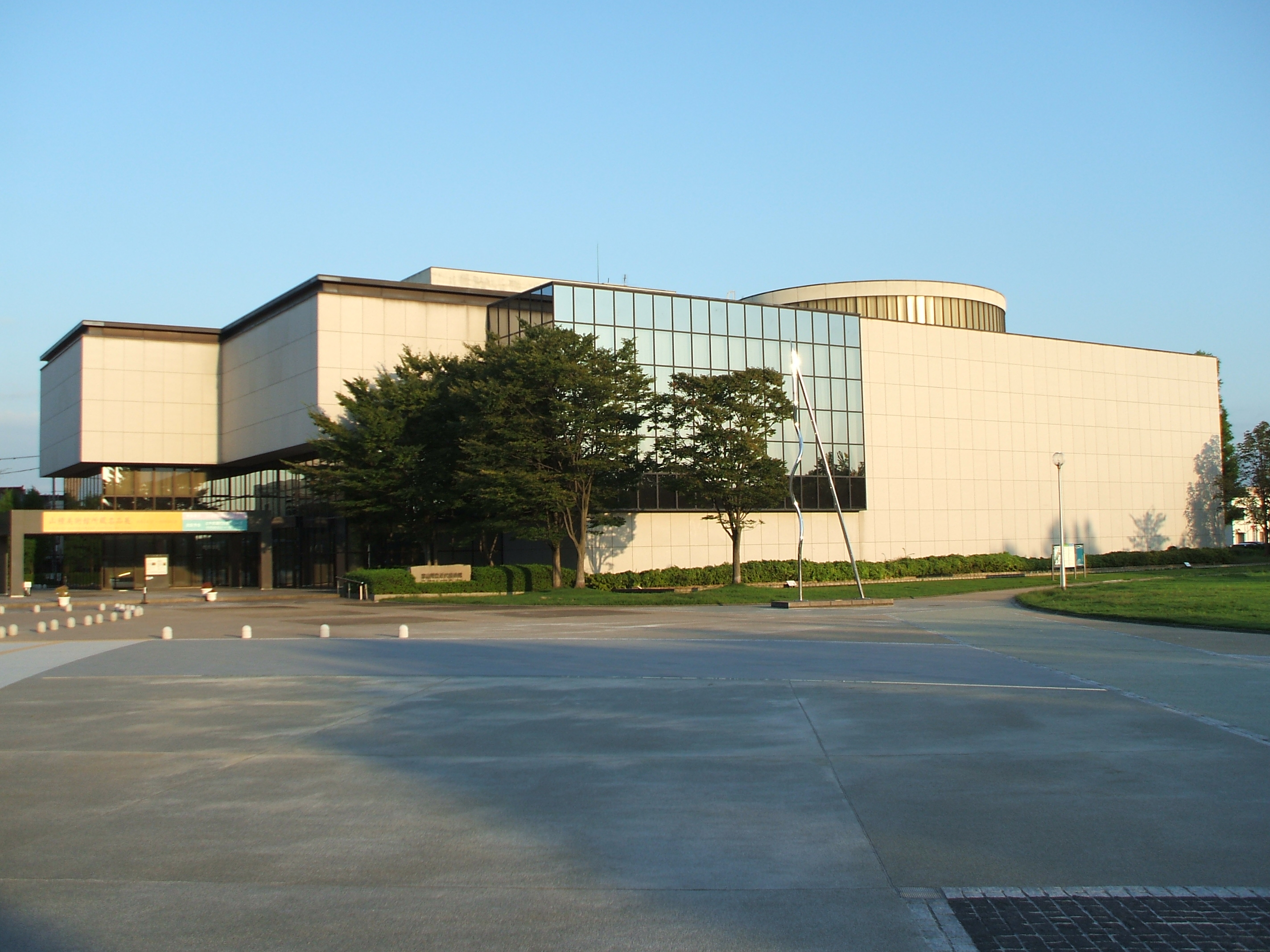
The former Museum of Modern Art, Toyama

The Museum of Modern Art, Toyama (富山県立近代美術館, Toyama Kenritsu Kindai Bijutsukan) was a public prefectural art museum in Toyama, Toyama Prefecture.

It closed in 2016. Its successor, the nearby Toyama Prefectural Museum of Art and Design, opened the following year.

== See also ==
- Prefectural museum
