= Museum Reinhard Ernst =

Art museum in Wiesbaden, Germany

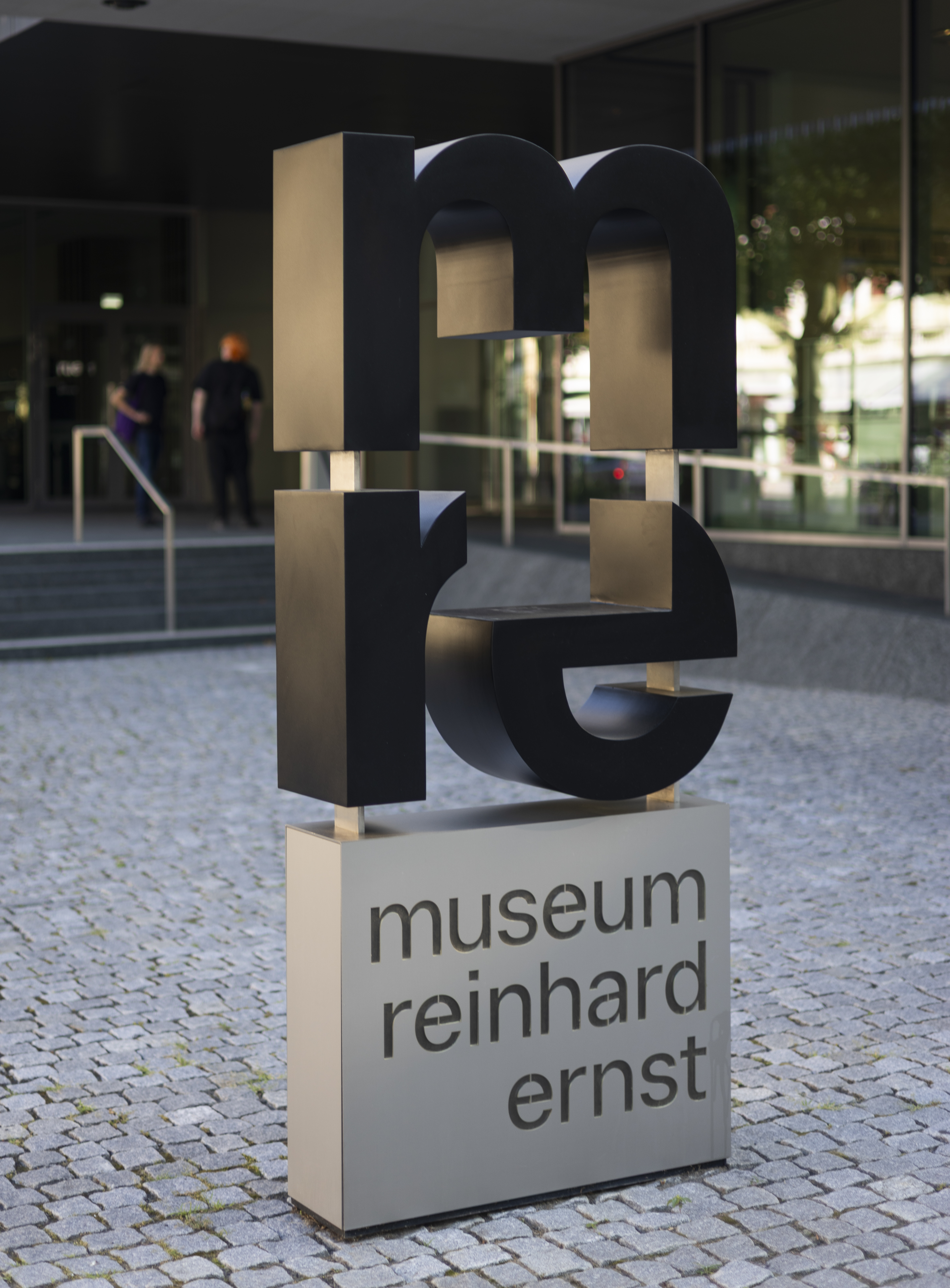
- Entrance sign for the Museum Reinhard Ernst in Wiesbaden, Germany
- Interactive map
- Established: June 24, 2024; 2 years ago
- Location: Wilhelmstraße 1, 65185 Wiesbaden, Germany
- Coordinates: 50.0785°N 8.2459°E
- Type: Art museum
- Director: Oliver Kornhoff
- Architect: Fumihiko Maki
- Website: museum-re.de

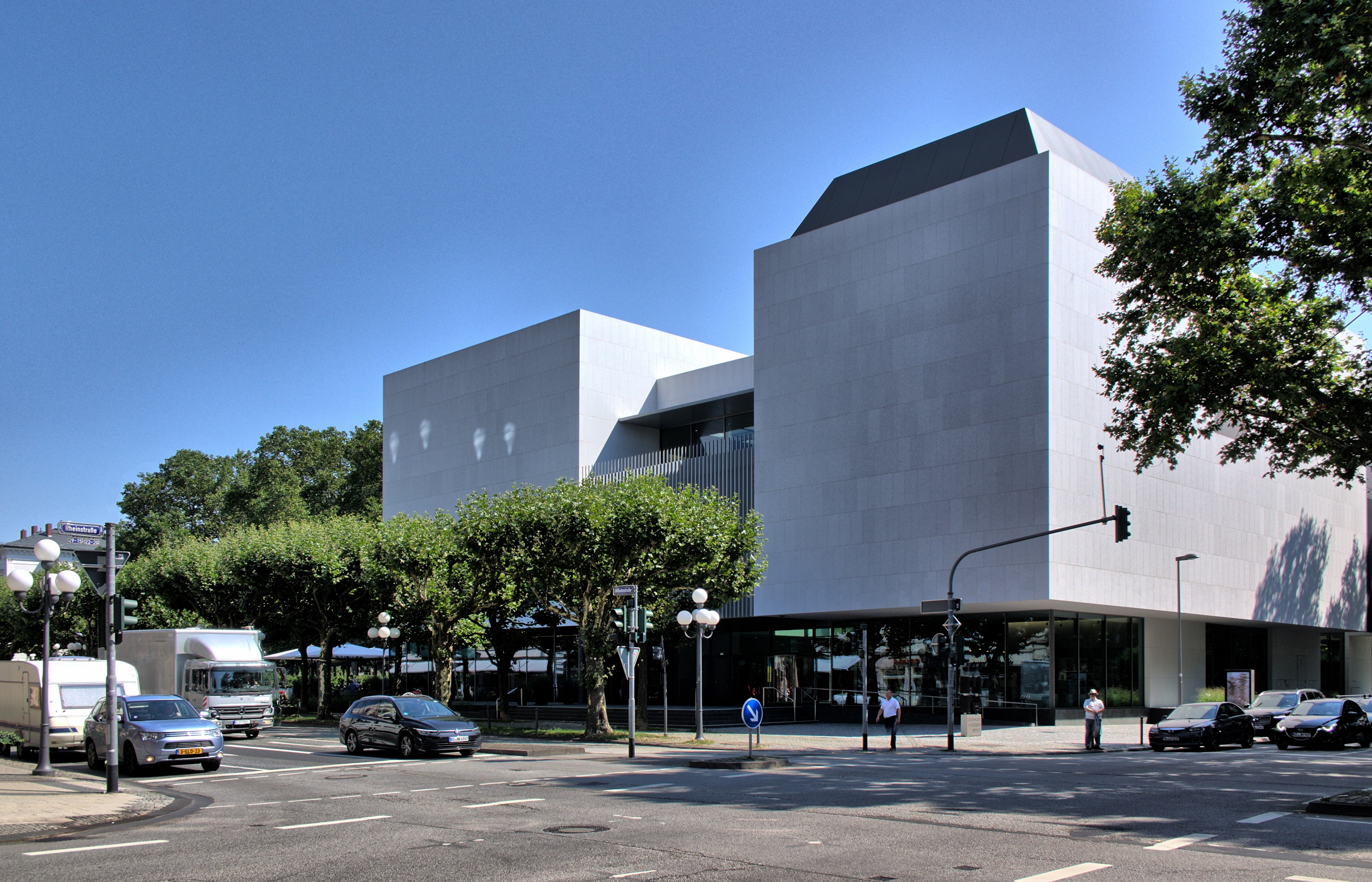
Museum Reinhard Ernst

The Museum Reinhard Ernst is an abstract art museum in Wiesbaden, Germany.

The museum features around 60 works collected by entrepreneur Reinhard Ernst, from his collection of some 960 works. It was opened in June 2024 by the Reinhard & Sonja Ernst Foundation, which Ernst runs with his wife Sonja. The founding director is Oliver Kornhoff.

== Architecture ==
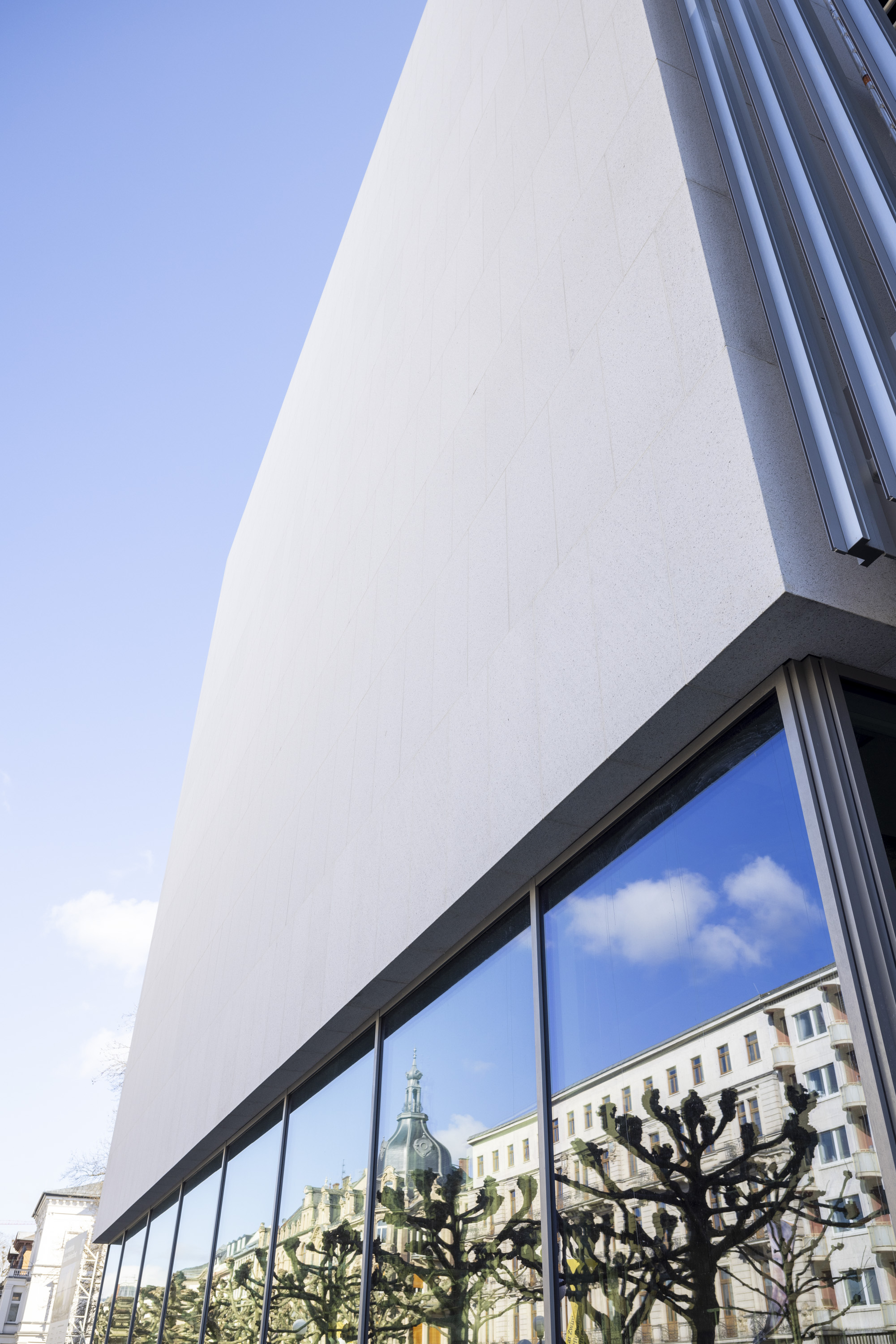
The exterior of the museum

The 9,700 square metres (104,000 sq ft) three-storey museum is situated on the corner of Wilhelmstraße and Rheinstraße, to the north of the Hesse Ministry of Finance building and Hesse Museum of Natural History. It was designed by the late Japanese architect Fumihiko Maki with a white granite cube-shaped facade. There are approximately 2,500 square metres (27,000 sq ft) available for exhibition space, with rooms up to 13 metres (43 ft) high.

== Collection and features ==
The museum is named after entrepreneur Reinhard Ernst exhibiting abstract paintings and sculptures which are part of his art collection. Artwork featured in the collection includes around 60 works from artists such as Tony Cragg, Helen Frankenthaler, Karl Otto Götz, Hans Hartung, Damien Hirst, Yuichi Inoue, Morris Louis, Jackson Pollock, Neo Rauch, Judit Reigl, Pierre Soulages, Toko Shinoda, Frank Stella Atsuko Tanaka and Wolfgang Tillmans. There is a collection of paintings in particular by American artist Helen Frankenthaler; Ernst owns the world's largest collection of her work, with 52 Frankenthaler paintings.

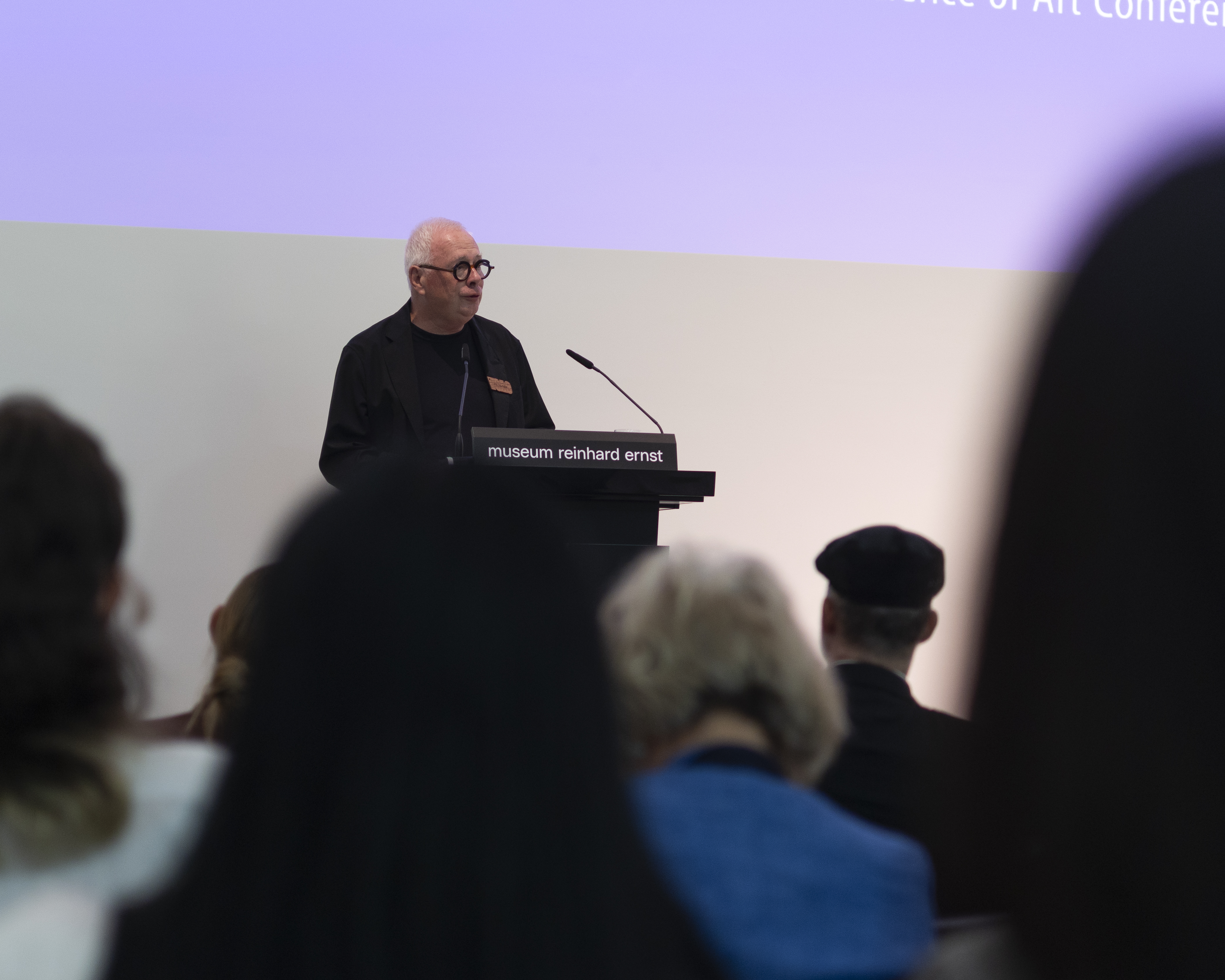
Jan Teunen delivers a lecture at the Visual Science of Art Conference at the Museum Reinhard Ernst

Glass works by Katharina Grosse, MadC, Karl-Martin Hartmann and Bettina Pousttchi are in the museum's foyer, and there are also sculptures by Eduardo Chillida in the inner courtyard.

The museum also hosts events, exhibitions and educational activities for children.
