= Oku (theory) =

Spatial theory or concept

Oku (Japanese: 奥) is a spatial theory or concept that pertains to the idea of "inwardness". It is unique to Japan and is an integral part of the urban space formation in the country. The term entails several abstract connotations such as profundity and can be used to describe not only physical but also psychological depth.

== Origin ==
The term Oku is both used in Japanese and Chinese languages and share three literal meanings: 1) private, intimate, and deep; 2) exalted and sacred; and, 3) profound and recondite. In Japan, Oku is also often used in adjective form. Some of the usage that are relevant to the notion of space includes, oku-dokoro (inner place), oku-sha (inner shrine), oku-yama (mountain recesses), and oku-zashiki (inner room).

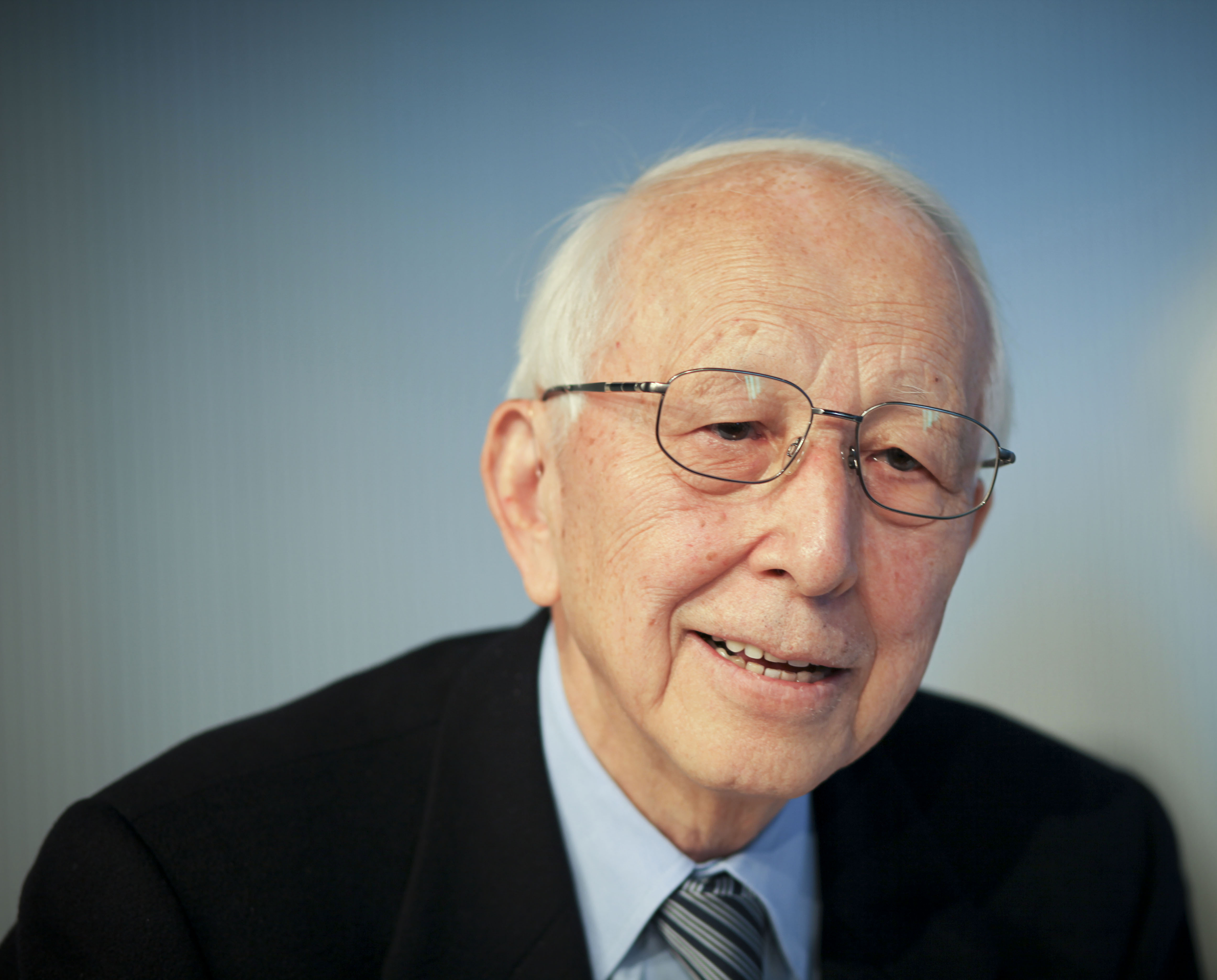
Fumihiko Maki proposed his theory of oku in his work, Japanese City Spaces and the Concept of Oku.

In traditional Japanese culture, Oku emerged as a principle to signify "the inner" or "inward". This idea is traced back to the emergence of rice cultivation in Japan and the environmental separation of villages from the environment. This formed part of the belief that the natural landscape has cosmological attachment, including spiritual spaces. In this view, the locations such as mountains and grove of trees are considered realms that are sacred and lofty, hence forbidden. According to Japanese architect Fumihiko Maki, "for the Japanese, the land is a living entity," and that "at the foundation of this idea is a feeling of deep respect for the land based upon its reverence". The environment came to be separated through spatial configurations from the Japanese homes and communities, which had relatively high densities since the ancient times. The cultural tradition that emerged from the chaotic world of the forest favored a type of harmony that is continually evolving.

== Concept ==
As a Japanese concept, Oku specifies an idea of spatial configurations, which implies a relative distance or an impression of it at a given space. It is also described as a concept that signifies relative or a sense of distance within a space. It is not limited to this kind of configuration as it also expresses psychological depth and an a priori image scheme when approached from the Kantian perspective. A broad conceptualization described it as an invisible middle point. For example, in the case of a building, the principle of Oku seeks to bring what is distant closer so that the interior and exterior are unified.

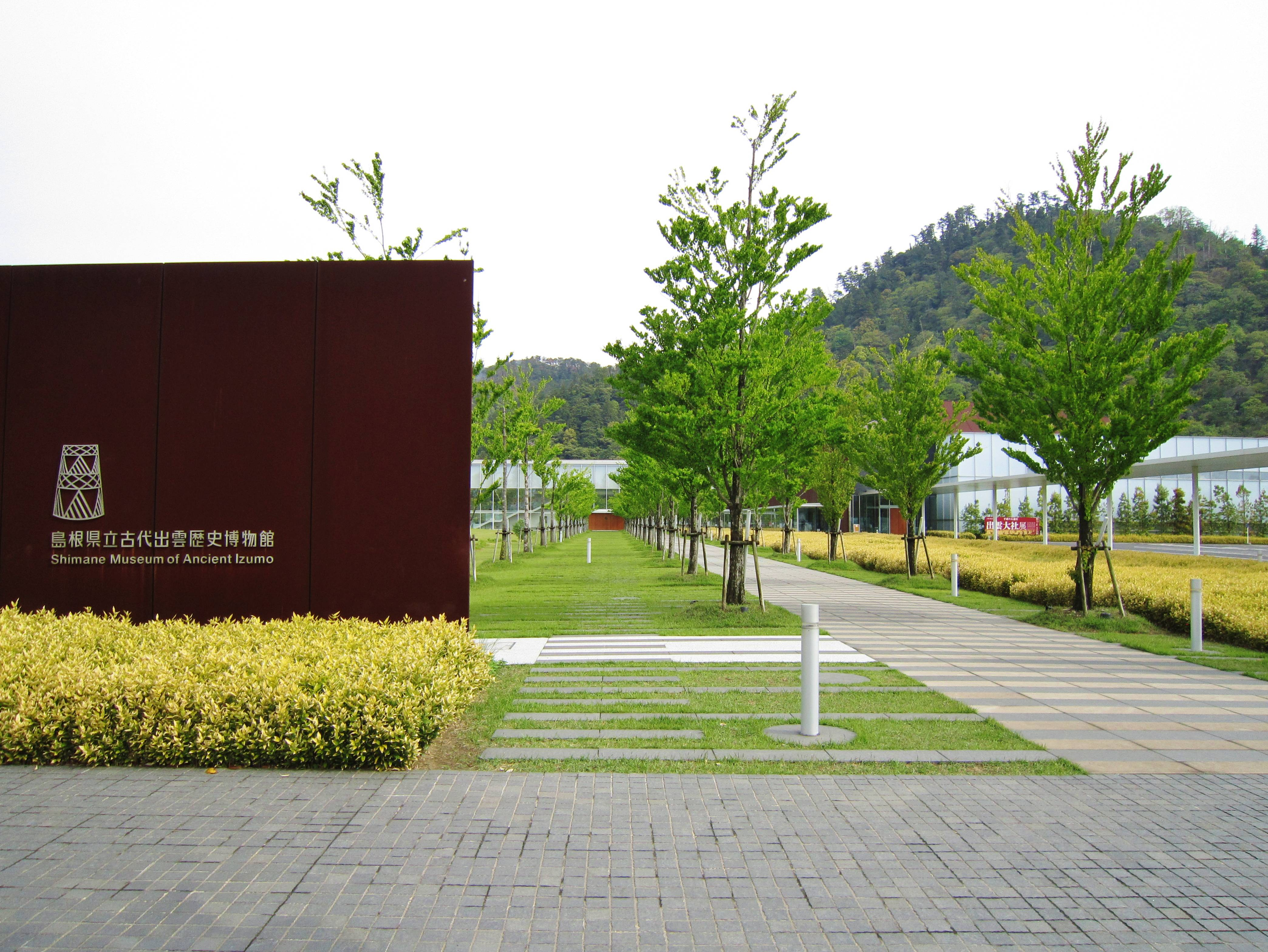
Oku is demonstrated in the architecture of the Shimane Museum of Ancient Izumo. It features a steel wall that runs along the approach to the museum while the landscaping that dominates the scene does not establish a focus.

The principle of Oku is often used in constructing homes and buildings in Japan that feature the layering of spaces from the outside to the inside with increasingly private zones. According to Maki, Oku can be distinguished from the so-called "center demarcation" to building spaces in Western culture. In addressing the relationship between center and boundary, the latter follows a layout oriented towards the attainment of the climax. Oku, on the other hand, works to embed drama and ritual in the process of the approach itself so that instead of going out of a route, the movement is all about searching or roaming. The feeling is also described as "moving into unknown places". In many instances, Oku does not have a climax since the ultimate destination gradually unfolds and this constructs a spatial experience with a time parameter.

Oku is often associated with the concept of ma, which corresponds to the notion of "in between" in Confucian thought. The latter involves the ambiguity of the boundaries while Oku is all about the ambiguity of the center. These two principles are said to be used to mediate what is found in nature and what an artist can make of it. Such mediation can be demonstrated in the way a designer turns a living Japanese garden into a vital and cubic enclosure.

The principle of Oku can also be applied in other fields such as art, literature, and individual behavior. This is seen in the multi-viewpoints of traditional landscape paintings, with each part of the drawing forming a different layer. The simultaneous coexistence of these elements create a complex symbolic spatiality.

== Boundaries ==
Oku or an impression of it is achieved through the creation of multi-layered boundaries that some scholars call spatial creases. Another analogy likened oku as the core of multiple layers in an onion. These boundaries are built and interrelated with several elements such as topography, roads, and fences, among others. It is suggested that these boundaries are analogous to a wrapping and serves as a structural principle that adds to the value in an analysis of a structure.

These creases or layers also demonstrate the other defining characteristic of Oku in terms of space - the focus on roaming or searching in the approach. The winding layers both conceal and hint at places where people can gather or rest. For this reason, different types of “denial” are used so that the space creates a sense of curiosity. An example was the kansho or the open space positioned at the center of each urban block within the Edo period Nagoya castle town. These spaces were embedded within the checkerboard layout of Nagoya and served as a place were urban activities took place.
