= Yuichi Inoue =

Japanese calligraphy artist

Yuichi Inoue (井上 有一, Inoue Yūichi; February 14, 1916 – June 15, 1985) was a Japanese artist known for his vibrant works of calligraphy, having been described as “one of the most distinguished calligraphers in the second half of 20th-century Japan.” He ignored the traditional conventions of sho (calligraphy) pioneering an abstract style that reached international recognition. He is most known for his single character pieces that often extend beyond the oversized paper they were created on. Several of his works are displayed in the permanent collection at the National Museum of Modern Art in Tokyo.

== Early life ==
Inoue was born in Asakusa, Tokyo on February 14, 1916. He graduated from the Tokyo Prefectural Aoyama Normal School (now Tokyo Gakugei University).

Inoue worked as a primary and junior high school teacher before training under famous calligrapher Sokyu Ueda for eight years. On March 10, 1945, Yuichi Inoue narrowly escaped a U.S. air raid on Tokyo, and experience which he referenced in artworks such as Tokyo-daikūshū (Tokyo Bombing).

== Art career ==
Inoue took part in the Third Shodō Geijutsuin (Calligraphy Academy) exhibition at Tokyo Metropolitan Art Museum. The first exhibition of Inoue’s own works took place in Tokyo in 1951. His art became associated with the abstract expressionism art movement, and appeared in major international exhibitions from the early 1950s. After this he took part in numerous exhibitions both in Japan and abroad, becoming one of the first modern Japanese artists to become popular among Western audiences in the post-war period. His work was represented in the Museum of Modern Art exhibition “Abstract Art - Japan and the USA”, which toured Japan and Europe.

In 1952 he created Bokujin-kai (Ink People Society) with fellow artist friends and served as chief editor of Bokujin, its monthly artistic magazine, until its 50th issue.

Inoue retired in 1976 after working for more than 41 years as a schoolteacher.

He created over 3,000 pieces prior to his death on June 15, 1985.

== Death and memorial ==
Inoue was hospitalised in early June 1985 due to fulminant hepatitis. He fell into a coma on June 7, and died eight days later on June 15. A memorial is held annually in remembrance of Inoue on the every second Saturday of June, in front of his artwork, The Tower of Ghosts.

== Personal life ==
In 1948, Inoue married Hirai Kikue with whom he had his daughter Hanako in 1951 and son Tōru in 1953.

== Selected Exhibitions ==
Inoue has taken part in numerous exhibitions, during his lifetime, both in Japan and around the world. Many retrospective exhibitions of his work have also been held since his death in 1985.

=== 1951-1895 ===
- Nitten National Exhibition (1951), Inoue’s first exhibition of his own calligraphy in Tokyo
- Modern Japanese Calligraphy, Museum of Modern Art, New York, USA (1954)
- Abstract Art – Japan and the USA (1955), National Museum for Modern Art, Tokyo
- L'encre de chine dans la calligraphie et l'art japonais contemporains (1955), a touring exhibition for Amsterdam, Basel, Paris, Hamburg and Rome
- “Gutetsu” (1957) at the 4th Biennale in São Paulo, Brazil
- 50 ans d'art moderne (1958), Centre for Fine Arts, Brussels, Belgium
- documenta 2 (1959) in Kassel, Germany
- 6th Biennale, São Paulo and Carnegie International (1961) in Pittsburgh, Pennsylvania, USA
- Writing and Image (1963), Stedelijk Museum Amsterdam and the Kunsthalle Baden-Baden, Germany
- Inoue Yûichi (1965), Von der Heydt Museum, Wuppertal, Germany
- Modern World Art (1969), National Museum of Modern Art, Tokyo
- YU-ICHI (1984) Word Images, UNAC Tokyo, Japan

=== 1985-present ===
- YU-ICHI Lives (1986), SEED Hall, Tokyo
- YU-ICHI, Farewell Thoughts (1986), NEWS, Tokyo
- YU-ICHI, Hundred Flowers (1987), Parco Gallery, Tokyo
- YU-ICHI, Works 1955 - 1985 (1989), a touring exhibition through six Japanese museums: National Museum of Modern Art, Kyoto; Fukuoka Prefectural Museum of Art, Fukuoka; Niigata City Art Museum, Niigata; Yamaguchi Prefectural Museum of Art, Yamaguchi; Ehime Prefectural Museum of Art, Ehime; Koriyama City Museum of Art, Fukushima
- The Splendour of Poverty (1992), Azabu Museum, Tokyo
- Screams against the Sky, Japanese Art after 1945. Modernism and Transition (1995), at the Yokohama Museum of Art, Yokohama; Guggenheim Museum SoHo, New York City; Museum of Modern Art, San Francisco, USA
- YU-ICHI (1995), Kunsthalle Basel, Switzerland
- YU-ICHI (1995), Hin, Gallery of the Tianjin Renmin Meishu Chubanshe, Tianjin, China; Schirn Kunsthalle, Frankfurt, Germany; Galerie im Karmeliterkloster, Frankfurt, Germany
- YU-ICHI INOUE - 1999, Seoul Arts Center, Seoul, South Korea
- Ineffably Beautiful, The Mystical Paradox in Twentieth Century Art (2003), Kunsthalle Erfurt, Erfurt, Germany
- Inoue Yuichi (2005), Hangzhou International Calligraphy Art Festival, China Academy of Art, Hangzhou, China
- Letter . Symbol . Gesture, Carlfriedrich Claus in the context from Klee to Pollock (2005), Kunstsammlung Chemnitz, Germany
- Zeichen setzen - YU-ICHI / UECKER (2005), Langen Foundation, Neuss, Germany
- Japan and the West, The Filled Void (2008), Kunstmuseum Wolfsburg, Wolfsburg, Germany
- Kanji Art of Inoue Yuichi (2008), Shi Fang Art Museum, Zhengzhou, China
- Works with the Collection of Rolf Ricke (2008), Villa Merkel, Esslingen am Neckar, Germany
- Works with the Collection of Rolf Ricke (2010), Villa Merkel, Esslingen, Germany
- The Art of Writing (2011), Kolonnaden, Wiesbaden, Germany
- Inoue Yuichi: Painting with All of One’s heart, and the Avantgarde Art of Calligraphy (2012), Karuizawa New Art Museum, Karuizawa, Japan
- Sharjah Biennial 11 (2013), Sharjah Art Foundation, Sharjah, United Arab Emirates
- Contemporary Art and Calligraphy - At the Nexus of Painting and Writing (2013), Seoul Arts Center, Seoul Calligraphy Art Museum, Seoul, South Korea
- Buddha - 108 Encounteres (2015), Museum Angewandte Kunst, Frankfurt
- Yuichi Inoue (2015), Setouchi City Museum of Art, Okayama, Japan
- Far Yet Close: Calligraphy by Inoue Yuichi (2015), Musée Tomo, Tokyo
- The End of Modernity in Calligraphy: From Yuichi Inoue, Lee Ufan to Zhang Yu (2015), Kuandu Museum of Fine Arts, Taipei, Taiwan
- Calligraphic Abstraction (2015), Seattle Art Museum, Seattle, USA
- A Centennial Exhibition INOUE Yuichi (2016), 21st Century Museum of Contemporary Art, Kanazawa, Japan
- YU-ICHI (2017), Nanjing University of the Arts, China
- Julius Bissier and East Asia. The Realm of my Imagination (May 19—September 23, 2018), “Ausstellungshalle” in the Augustiner Museum, Museum für Neue Kunst, Freiburg im Breisgau, Germany
- Alles unter dem Himmel (2018), Museum für Ostasiatische Kunst, Köln
- YU-ICHI INOUE, La calligraphie libérée (1916-1985) (September 29—December 17, 2018), Musée Toulouse-Lautrec, Albi, France
- Epic Abstraction. Pollock to Herrera (2018), Metropolitan Museum of Art, New York
- Tensakukai (2021), UNAC Tokyo
- “Écrire, c'est Dessiner” (November 6, 2021—February 21, 2022), Centre Pompidou-Metz
- 11. Tensakukai - Hommage to YU-ICHI (2023), Tokyo Metropolitan Theater Gallery, Tokyo
- Farbe ist alles! (2024), Museum Reinhard Ernst, Wiesbaden
- Welt im Fluß (2025), Museum Angewandte Kunst, Frankfurt
