= Ma (negative space) =

Japanese artistic concept

Left panel of the Pine Trees Screen (松林図 屏風, Shōrin-zu byōbu) by Hasegawa Tōhaku. The empty space in this piece is considered to be as important as the trees depicted.

Ma (間, lit. 'gap, space, pause') is a Japanese concept of negative space, and a Japanese reading of the Sino-Japanese character 間.

== Ma in Japanese culture ==
In modern interpretations of traditional Japanese arts and culture, ma is an artistic interpretation of an empty space, often holding as much importance as the rest of an artwork and focusing the viewer on the intention of negative space in an art piece. The concept of space as a positive entity is opposed to the absence of such a principle in a correlated "Japanese" notion of space.

Though commonly used to refer to literal, visible negative space, ma may also refer to the perception of a space, gap or interval, without necessarily requiring a physical compositional element. This results in the concept of ma being less reliant on the existence of a gap, and more closely related to the perception of a gap. The existence of ma in an artwork has been interpreted as "an emptiness full of possibilities, like a promise yet to be fulfilled", and has been described as "the silence between the notes which make the music".

=== In arts and crafts ===
The tokonoma alcove in a traditional Japanese room is a space or a stage used to display important objects, such as a painting scroll, an important art object, or a flower arrangement. The concept is also associated with oku or the Japanese spatial concept of "inwardness".

In ikebana, the space around the flowers is considered to be equally as important as the flowers and plants themselves, with harmony and balance between the two considered the ideal.

In karate, ma refers to the distance between two fighters. Knowing the safe distance between oneself and an opponent based on their reach is considered "understanding ma".

== Etymology ==
Among English loanwords of Japanese origin, both ma (interval, space) and ken (unit of architectural measurement) are written with the Chinese character 間 derived from the character 門 ("door") and 日 ("sun").

Originally, the character 間 was written with the radical for "moon" (月) instead of the character for "sun" (日), and, in this form (閒, xián), depicted, according to Bernhard Karlgren, "A door through the crevice of which the moonshine peeps in".

The character can be read differently when emphasis is put on the connection between things (awai), the distance between things (aida), or the distance between people (aidagara).

== Ma in the West ==
In his 2001 book, The Art of Looking Sideways, graphic designer Alan Fletcher discussed the importance that perceived negative space could hold in art:

Space is substance. Cézanne painted and modelled space. Giacometti sculpted by "taking the fat off space". Mallarmé conceived poems with absences as well as words. Ralph Richardson asserted that acting lay in pauses... Isaac Stern described music as "that little bit between each note - silences which give the form"... The Japanese have a word (ma) for this interval which gives shape to the whole. In the West we have neither word nor term. A serious omission.

— The Art of Looking Sideways, page 370

Derrick de Kerckhove described ma as "the complex network of relationships between people and objects".

In a 2012 interview, film critic Roger Ebert discussed with director Hayao Miyazaki the latter's use of ma in his films:

I told Miyazaki I love the “gratuitous motion” in his films; instead of every movement being dictated by the story, sometimes people will just sit for a moment, or they will sigh, or look in a running stream, or do something extra, not to advance the story but only to give the sense of time and place and who they are.

“We have a word for that in Japanese,” he said. “It’s called ma. Emptiness. It’s there intentionally.”

Is that like the “pillow words” that separate phrases in Japanese poetry?

“I don’t think it’s like the pillow word.” He clapped his hands three or four times. “The time in between my clapping is ma. If you just have non-stop action with no breathing space at all, it’s just busyness, But if you take a moment, then the tension building in the film can grow into a wider dimension. If you just have constant tension at 80 degrees all the time you just get numb.”

== See also ==
- Liminality
- Maai
- Mu
- Negative space
- The Void (philosophy)
- Wu wei, a term in Chinese philosophy
- Yin and yang
