= Fumihiko Maki =

Japanese architect (1928–2024)

- 槇 文彦
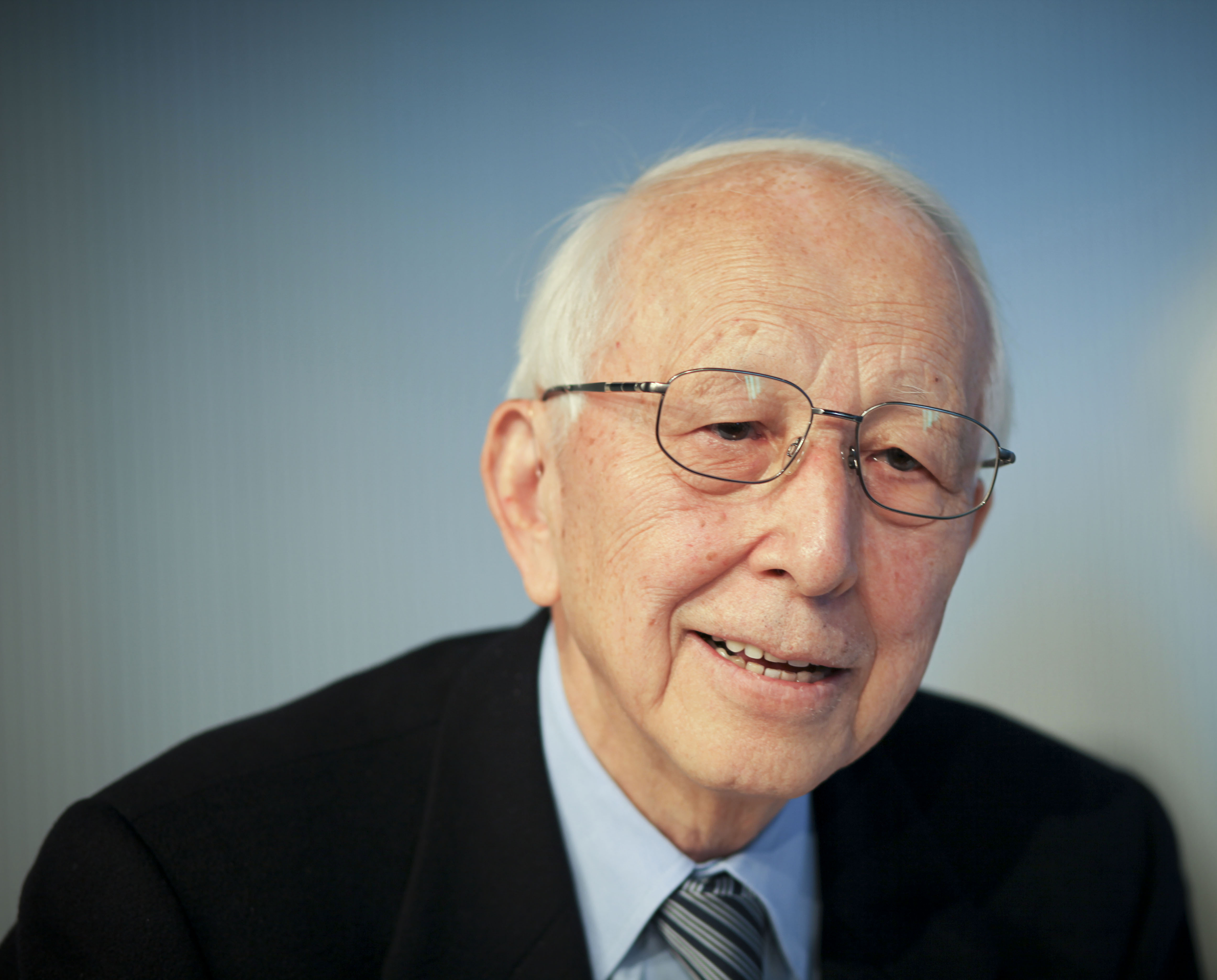
- Maki in 2010
- Born: 6 September 1928; Tokyo, Japan
- Died: 6 June 2024 (aged 95)
- Education: University of Tokyo (Bachelor of Architecture, 1952); Cranbrook Academy of Art (Master of Architecture, 1953); Graduate School of Design, Harvard University (Master of Architecture, 1954)
- Occupation: Architect
- Awards: Pritzker Prize; AIA Gold Medal
- Practice: Maki and Associates
- Buildings: Yerba Buena Center for the Arts, Mildred Lane Kemper Art Museum, 4 World Trade Center
- Projects: Expansion of the headquarters of the United Nations in Manhattan.
- Website: www.maki-and-associates.co.jp

Fumihiko Maki (槇 文彦, Maki Fumihiko; 6 September 1928 – 6 June 2024) was a Japanese architect. In 1993, he received the Pritzker Prize for his work, which often explores pioneering uses of new materials and fuses the cultures of east and west. Maki died on 6 June 2024, at the age of 95.

== Early life ==
Maki was born in Tokyo. While studying at the University of Tokyo, one of his professors was Kenzo Tange, one of the most influential post-war architects. Tange introduced him to Metabolism and Urbanism which was very influential to Maki. He then graduated with a Bachelor of Architecture degree in 1952, moved to the Cranbrook Academy of Art in Bloomfield Hills, Michigan, graduating with a master's degree in 1953. A year later he studied at Harvard Graduate School of Design, graduating with a Master of Architecture degree in 1954.

Maki stated that the Urban Design conference was an influential event he attended while at the GSD (Graduate School Design).

As noted above, Maki was awarded the Pritzker Prize in 1993, being the second Japanese Architect to receive this award after Tange. This was influential for Maki because it acknowledged his work and achievements globally.

== Career ==
From 1956 to 1963, he took a post as assistant professor of architecture at Washington University in St. Louis, where he also was awarded his first commission: the design of Steinberg Hall (an art center) on the university's Danforth Campus. This building remained his only completed work in the United States until 1993, when he completed the Yerba Buena Center for the Arts building in San Francisco. In 2006, he returned to Washington University in St. Louis to design the new home for the Mildred Lane Kemper Art Museum and Walker Hall.

In 1960 he returned to Japan to help establish the Metabolism Group, an avant-garde movement that formed in 1960. "The group adopted the world to express their ambitions to actively, metabolically develop a city through continuous growth and renewal." This group allowed Maki to learn and create new ideas about Urbanism.

Fumihiko stated that Urbanism is "the essential backcloth to architecture." This is necessary because without knowing the background and culture of an area, the design won't having meaning to that place. Architecture is supposed to build greater meaning to where it is being placed.

After leaving Washington University, he became an assistant professor at Harvard in 1964.

Maki worked for Skidmore, Owings and Merrill in New York City and for Sert Jackson and Associates in Cambridge, Massachusetts and founded Maki and Associates in 1965.

When he returned to Tokyo in 1965, he worked on the Hillside Terrace Project for almost a quarter of a century beginning in 1967. This project that he had been working on over a long period of time helped show how the project evolved his career. It had six different phases each at a different time in his life. He mentioned how this project shaped his architectural views and experiences as the lifestyle in Tokyo had changed, meaning the project was as well.

In 2006, he was invited to join the judging panel for an international design competition for the new Gardens by the Bay in Singapore. Maki designed an extension building for the MIT Media Lab in Cambridge, Massachusetts, which was completed in 2009.

After completing a $330 million expansion of the headquarters of the United Nations in Manhattan, Maki designed Tower 4 at the former World Trade Center site which opened in 2013. While it has criticized his 51 Astor Place project as "out of place," New York magazine called Tower 4 "pretty exquisite."

Maki designed the London campus of the Aga Khan University along with a cultural centre as part of the King's Cross development project. This was Maki's first European projects and represented the third and fourth Aga Khan projects for Maki, who also designed the Delegation of the Ismaili Imamat in Ottawa and Aga Khan Museum in Toronto. He was also assigned by the Sonja & Reinhard Ernst Stiftung to design the Museum Reinhard Ernst in Wiesbaden, Germany, to display the foundations' collection of abstract art.

Maki's work was guided by philosophy, he always thought about it as the way a person could use the space, basing it on human experiences and spatial perception. According to Maki, light entering a space is a central point of the design, and is the driving force from every scale even in materiality choice. Maki also mentioned how light entering a space is very crucial, playing a role in the way people interact, and feel. He wrote, "naturally, patterns of light and shadow, earthy colors and textures, as well as the sound of water, when integrated into built environments, are imbued with a special poetic quality of their own. It follows that various poetic and architectonic principles, experienced simultaneously as related."

== Works ==
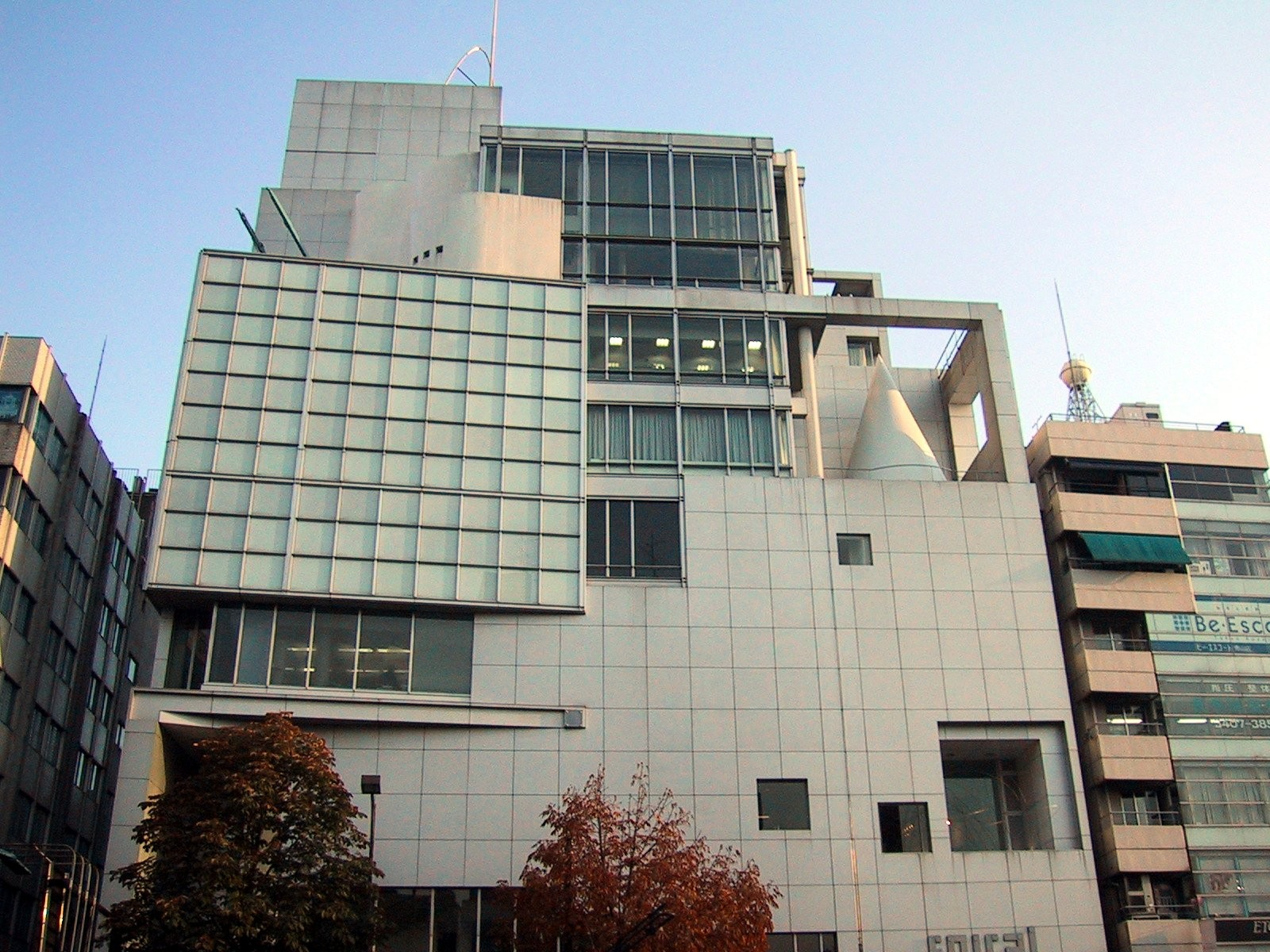
Spiral Building in Tokyo, 1985

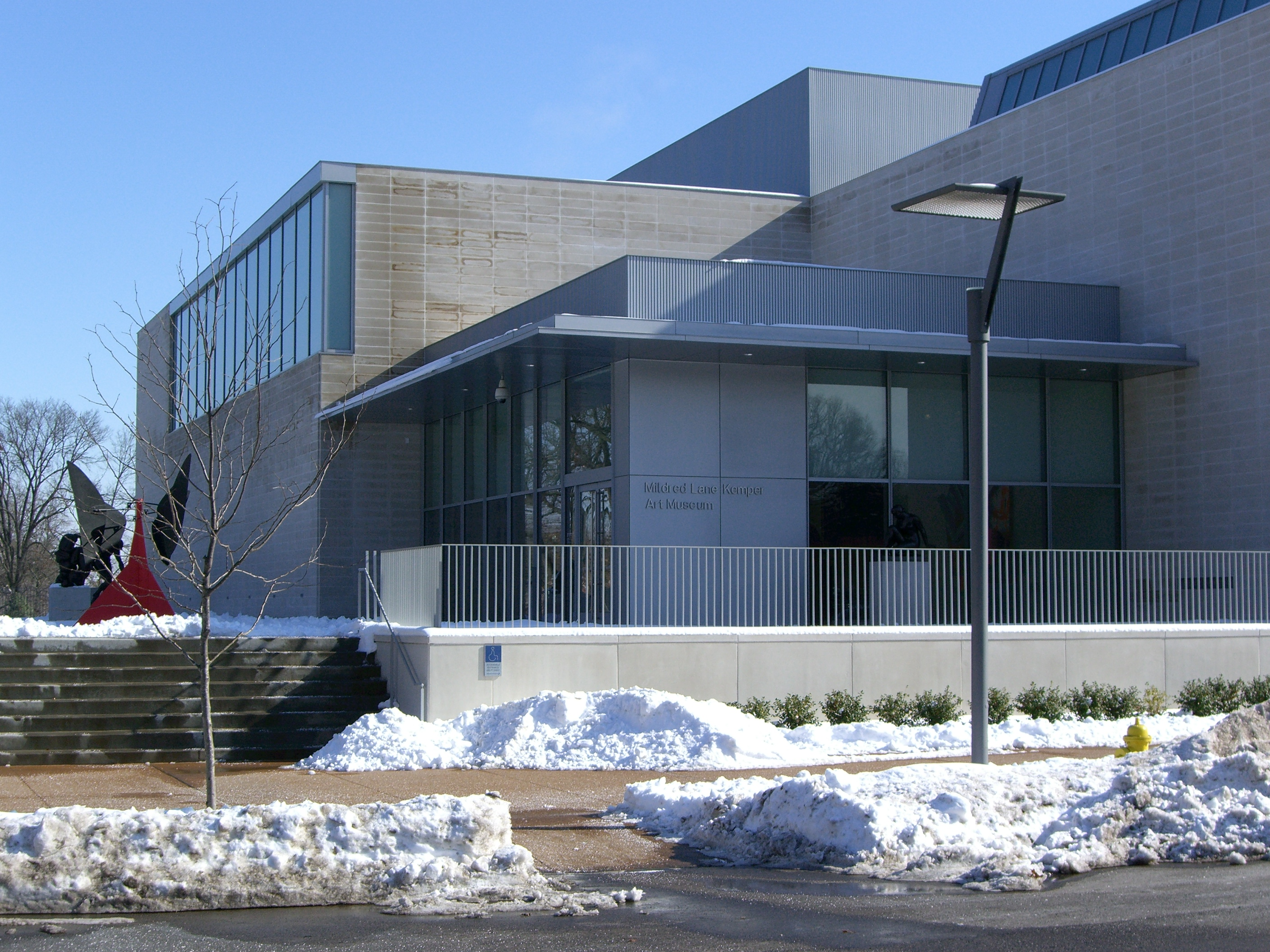
Kemper Art Museum, Washington University in St. Louis, 2006

Maki is known for fusing modernism with Japanese architectural traditions. For instance, he introduced the concept of oku, which is the idea of "inwardness" and a spatial theory. He wrote, "perceiving space is important in formulating ideas of what future cities should be like". Also, as written in his journal, he mentioned many different types of oku which are "oku-dokoro (inner place), oku-guchi (inner entrance), oku-sha (inner shrine), oku-yama (mountain recesses), and oku-zashiki (inner room), all relevant to the notion of physical space; oku-gi (secret or hidden principles) and oku-den (secret or hidden mysteries of an art)."

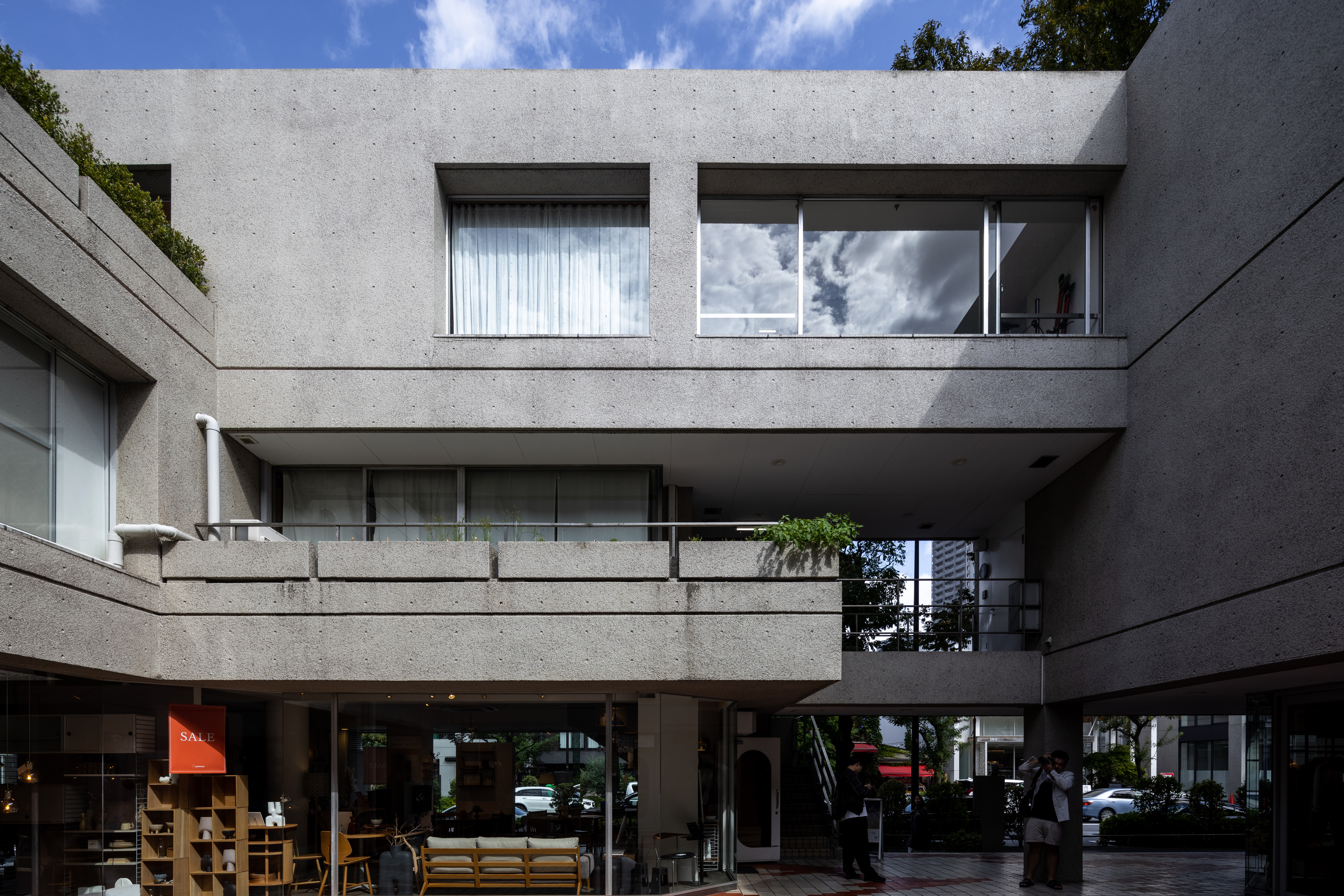
Hillside Terrace, Building C in Tokyo, 1972

This is demonstrated in the use of walls and landscape in the Shimane Museum of Ancient Izumo.

Maki's other notable projects include the following:

Japan:

- Toyoda Auditorium, main building and landmark of Nagoya University (1960)
- Hillside Terrace (1969)
- Expo '70, with Kenzo Tange and others (1970, Osaka)
- St. Mary's International School (1971)
- Osaka Prefectural Sports Center (1972)
- Okinawa Ocean Expo Aquarium(1975–2002)
- Spiral (1985)
- Makuhari Messe (1989)
- Keio University Shonan Fujisawa Campus (1990)
- Tokyo Metropolitan Gymnasium (1991)
- TV Asahi (2003)

United States

- Steinberg Hall at Washington University (1960s in St. Louis)
- Yerba Buena Center for the Arts (1993 in San Francisco)
- Mildred Lane Kemper Art Museum and Walker Hall at Washington University (2006 in St. Louis)
- MIT Media Lab Extension at Massachusetts Institute of Technology (2009 in Cambridge, Massachusetts)
- Annenberg Public Policy Center at the University of Pennsylvania (2009 in Philadelphia)
- 51 Astor Place (2013 in Manhattan, New York)
- 4 World Trade Center (150 Greenwich Street) (2013 in Manhattan)

Germany

- Ensemble Global Gate (2000–2006 in Düsseldorf)
- Office Building Solitaire (2001 in Düsseldorf)

Singapore

- Republic Polytechnic (2006)
- Skyline @ Orchard Boulevard (2015)

Canada

- Delegation of the Ismaili Imamat (2008 in Ottawa)
- Aga Khan Museum (2014 in Toronto)

Switzerland

- Building Square 3 at Novartis Campus (2009 in Basel)

China

- Sea World Culture and Arts Center (2017 in Shekou)

United Kingdom

- Aga Khan Centre (2018 in London)

India

- Bihar Museum 2015 in Patna

Works in progress

- United Nations new building in New York City
- Andhra Pradesh capital city, Amaravati
- New city hall of Yokohama
- Reinhard Ernst Museum in Wiesbaden

== Gallery of works ==
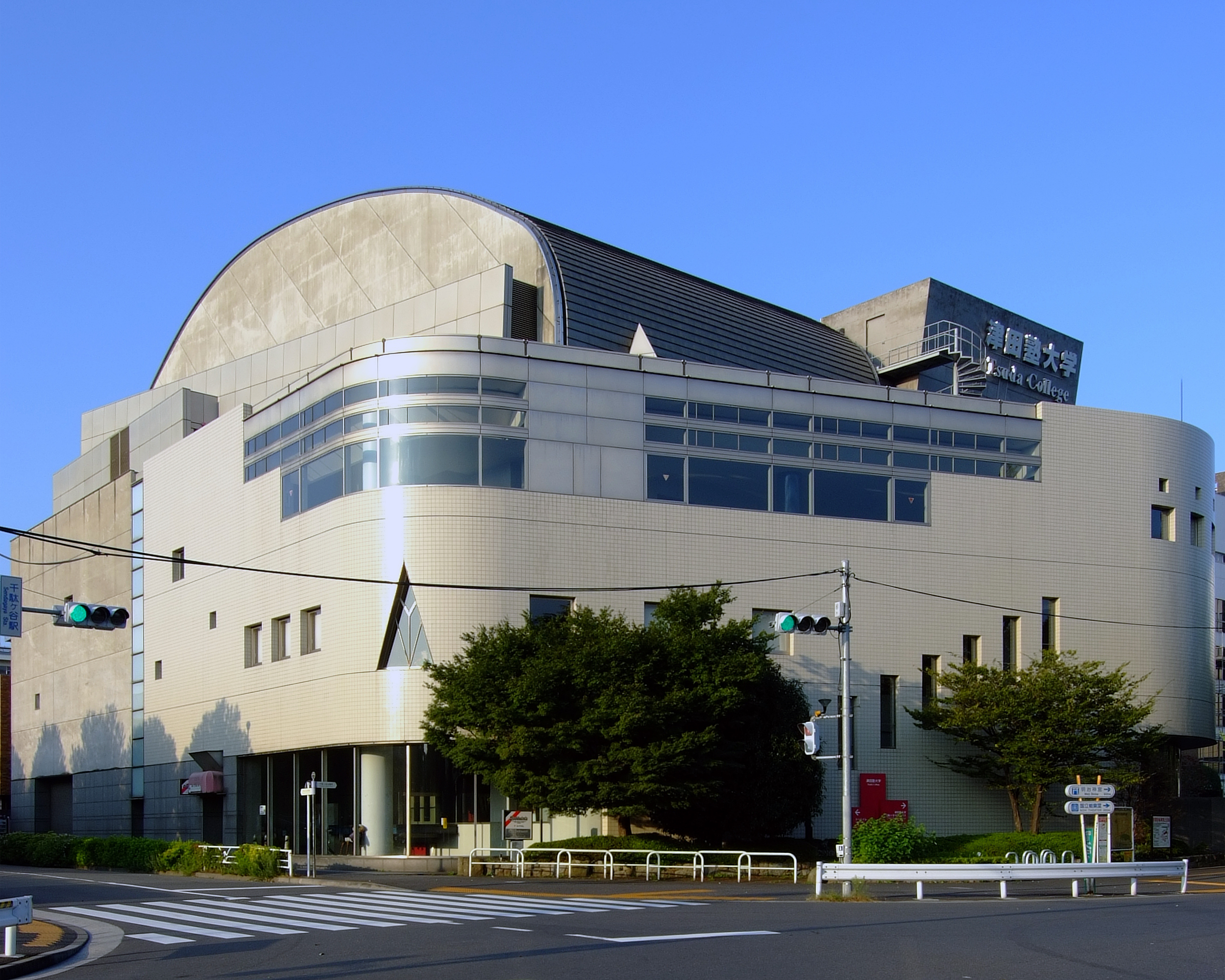
Tsuda Hall, Tokyo (1988)

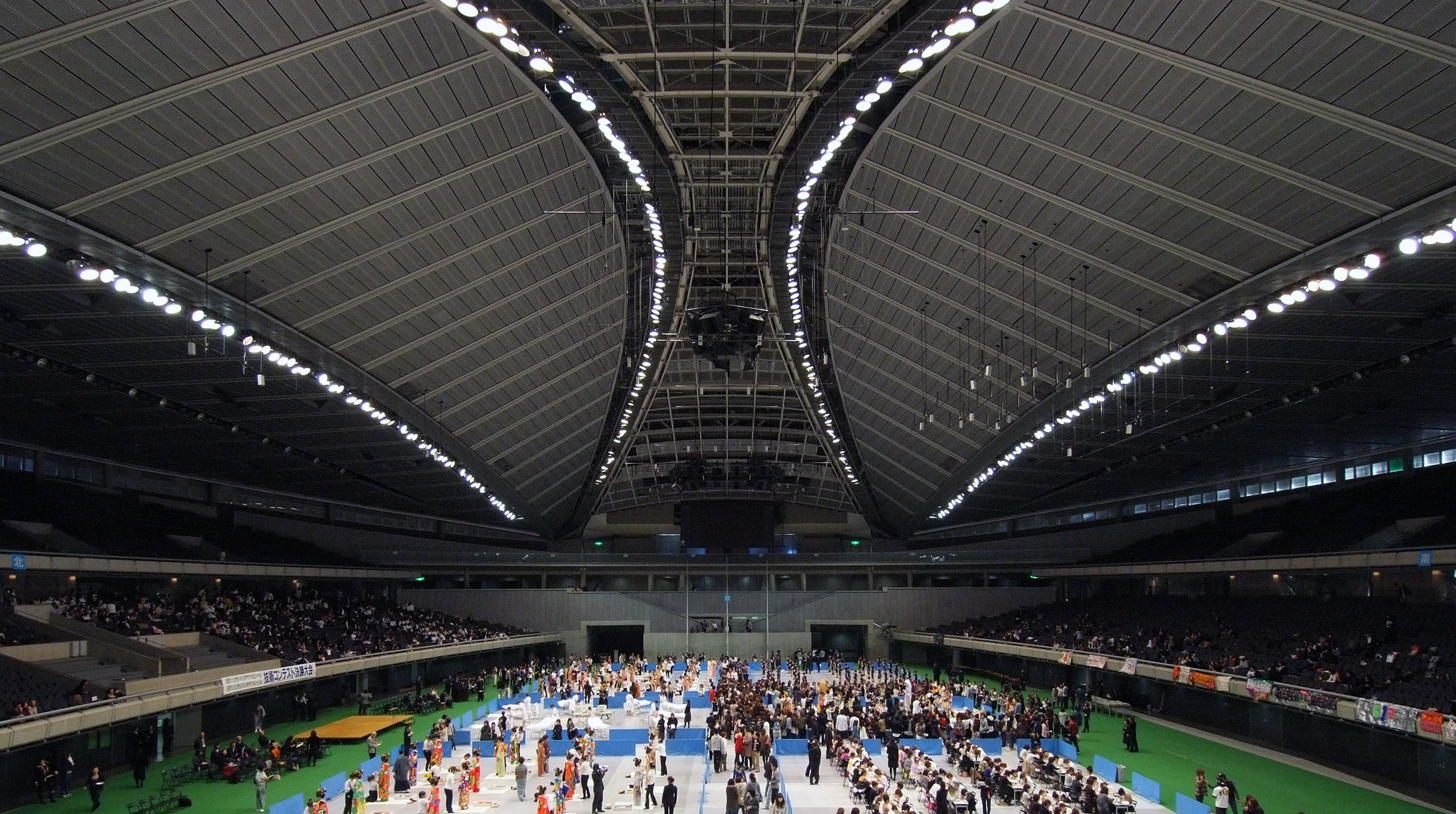
Tokyo Metropolitan Gymnasium, Sendagaya Tokyo (1990)

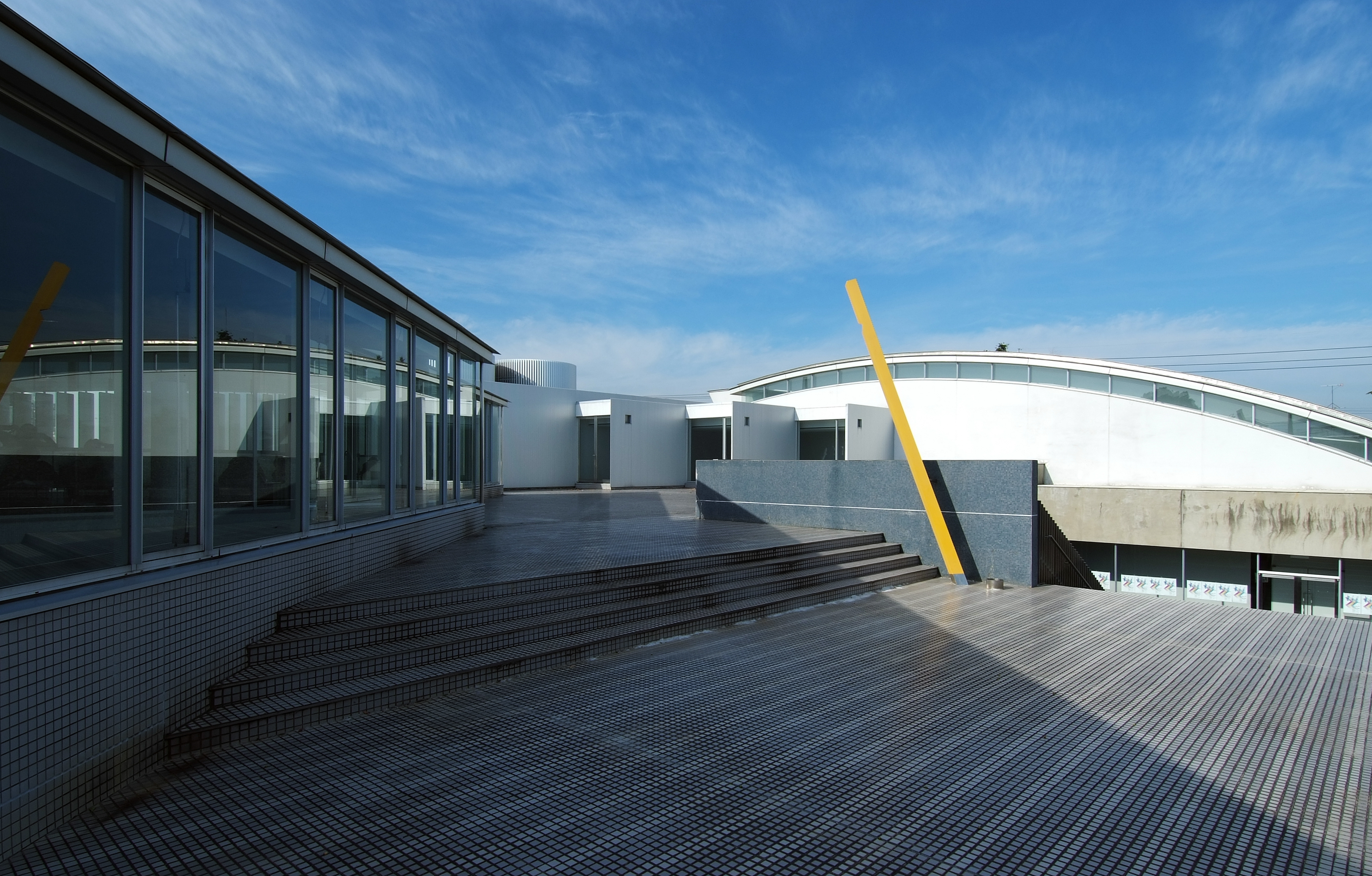
Nakatsu Obata Commemoration Library, Nakatsu Ōita Japan (1993)

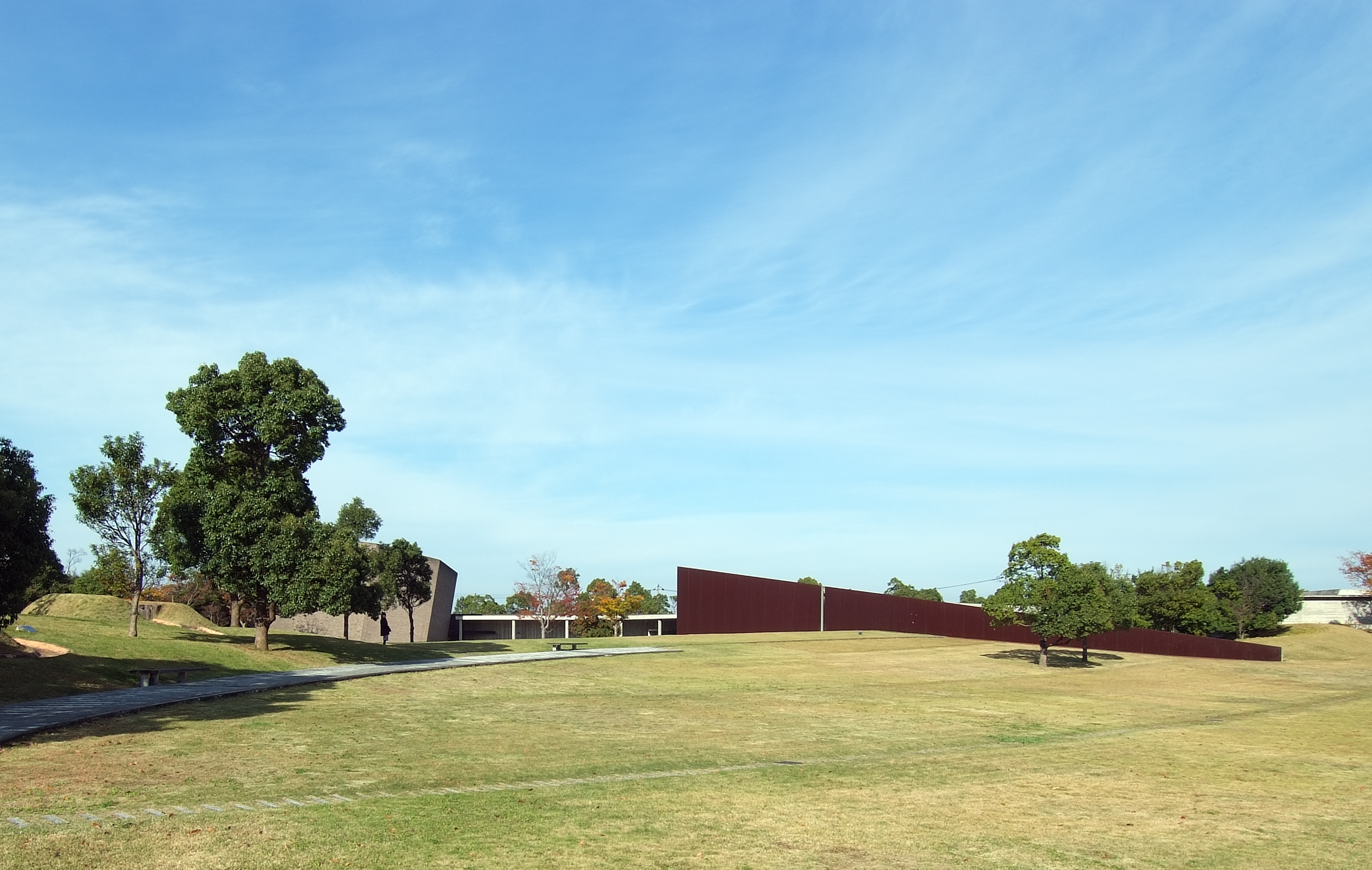
Kaze-no-Oka Crematorium (1997)

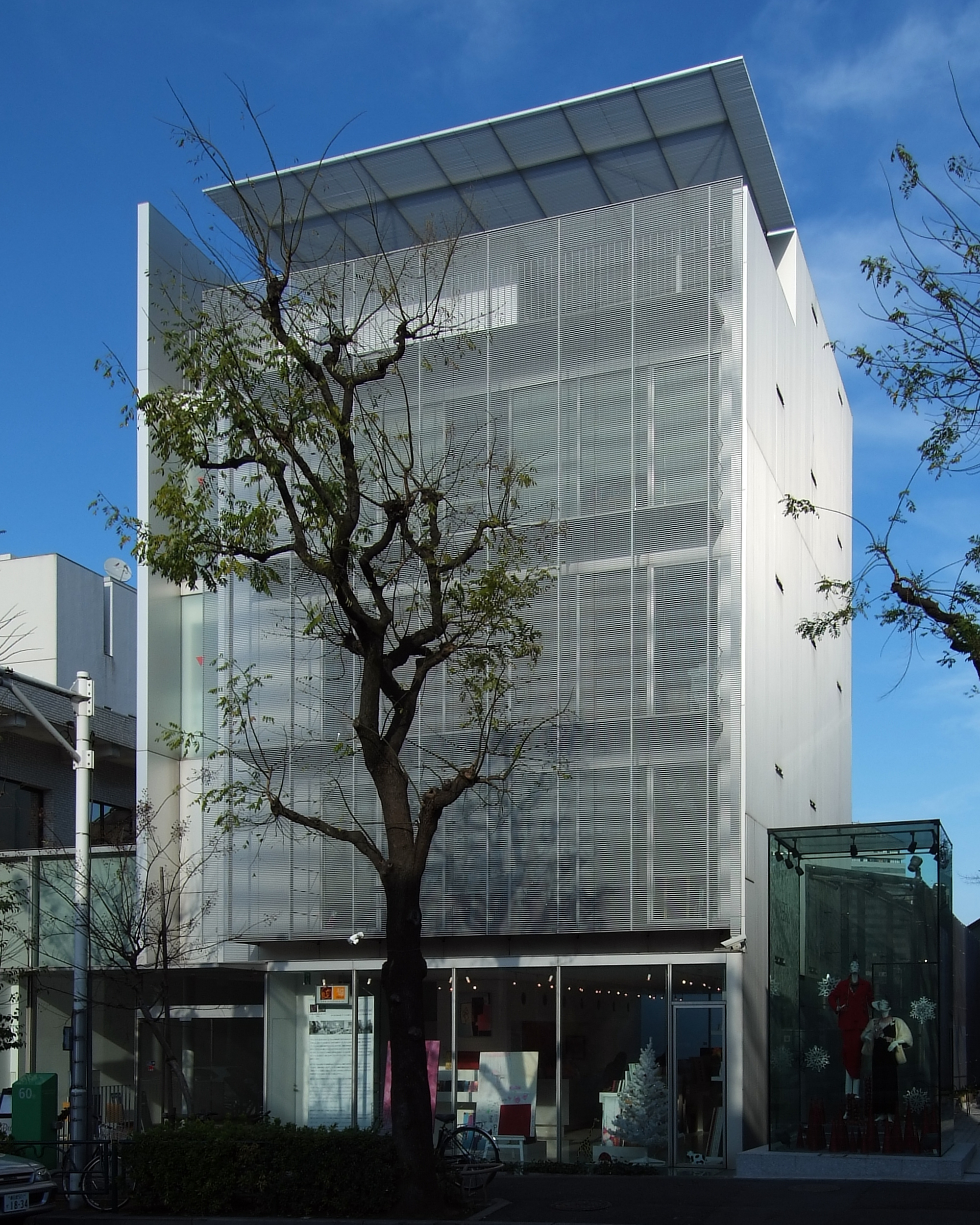
Hillside West (1998)

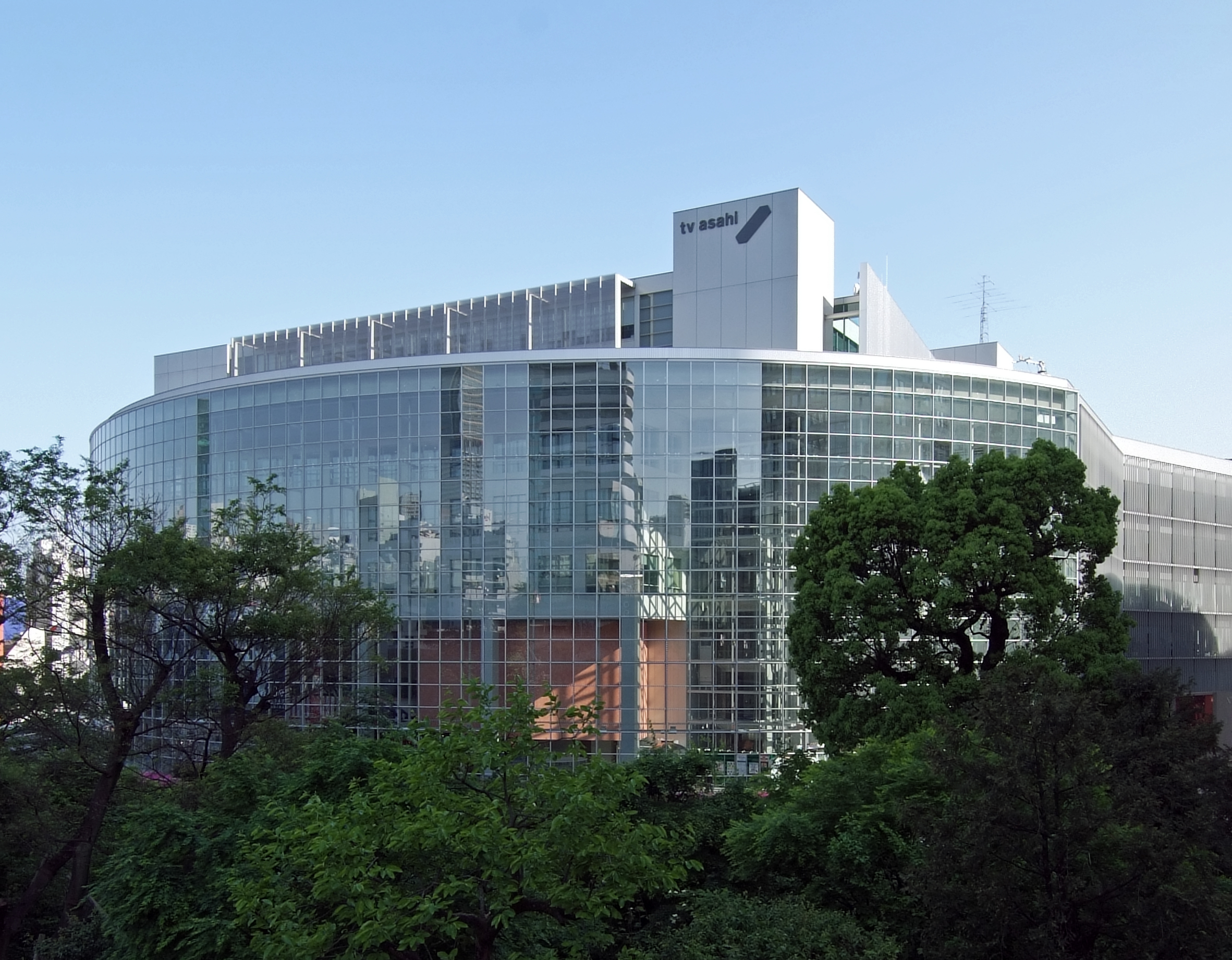
TV Asahi Headquarters, Tokyo (2003)

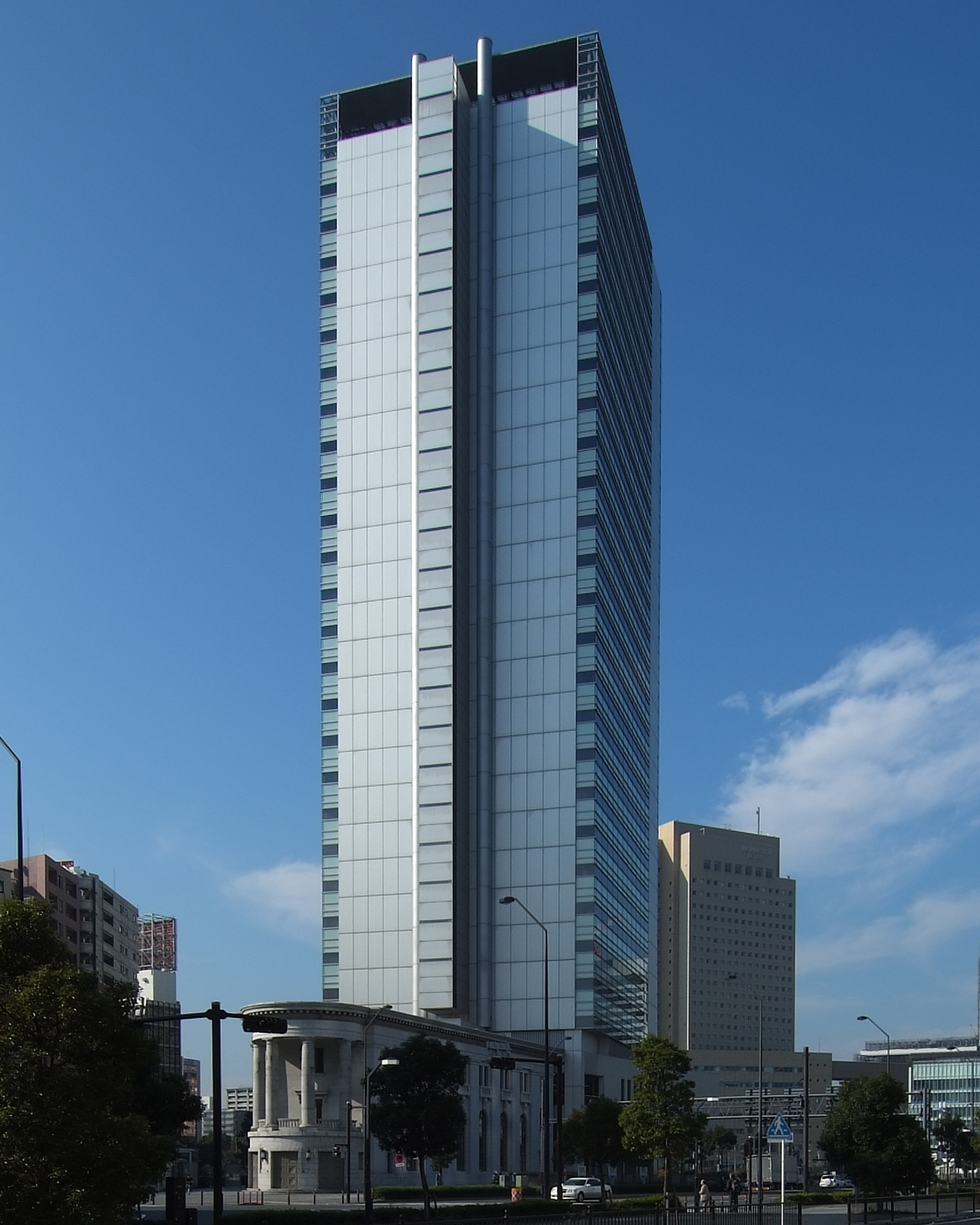
Yokohama Island Tower, Yokohama (2003)

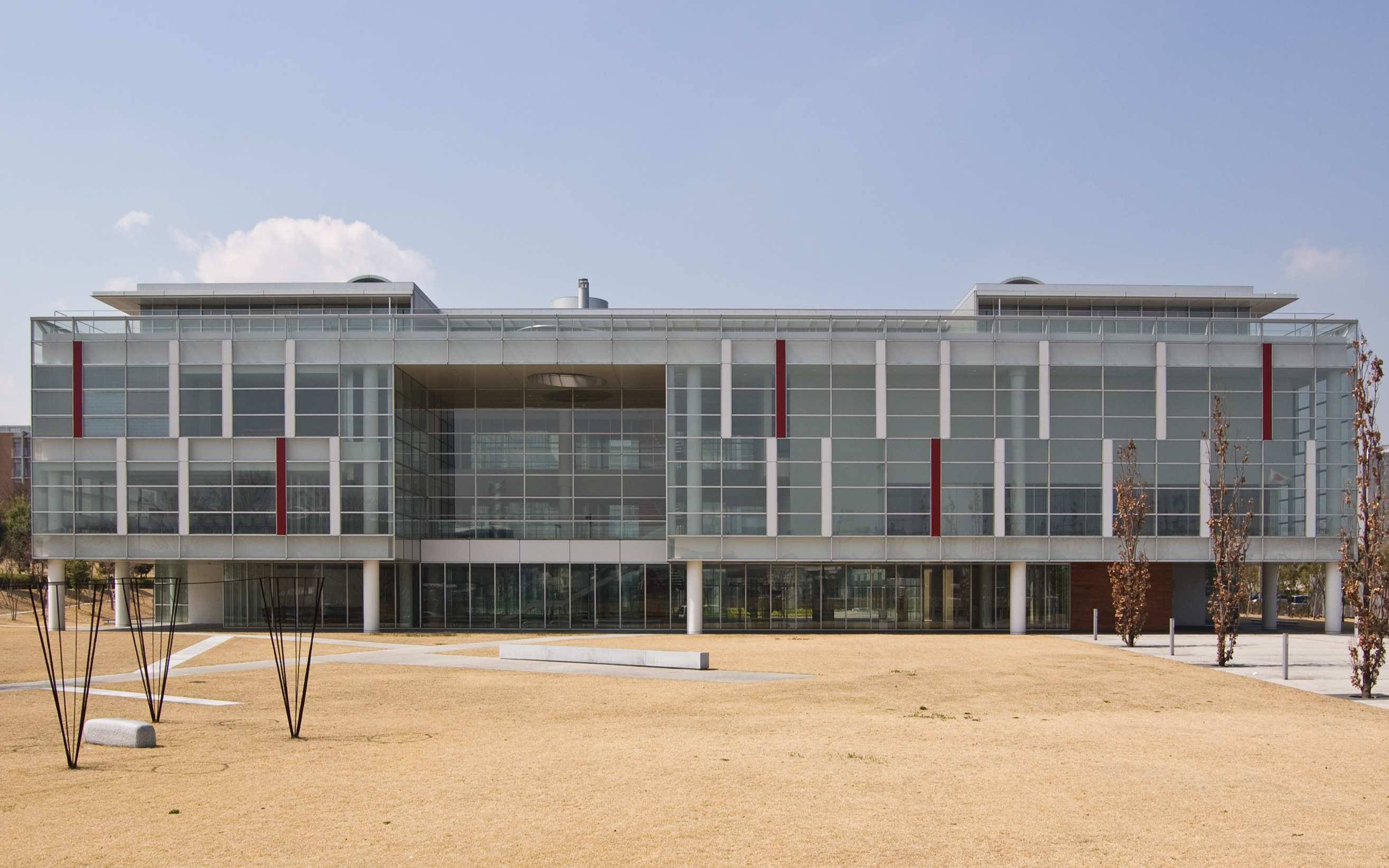
The National Institute for Japanese Language, Tokyo (2005)

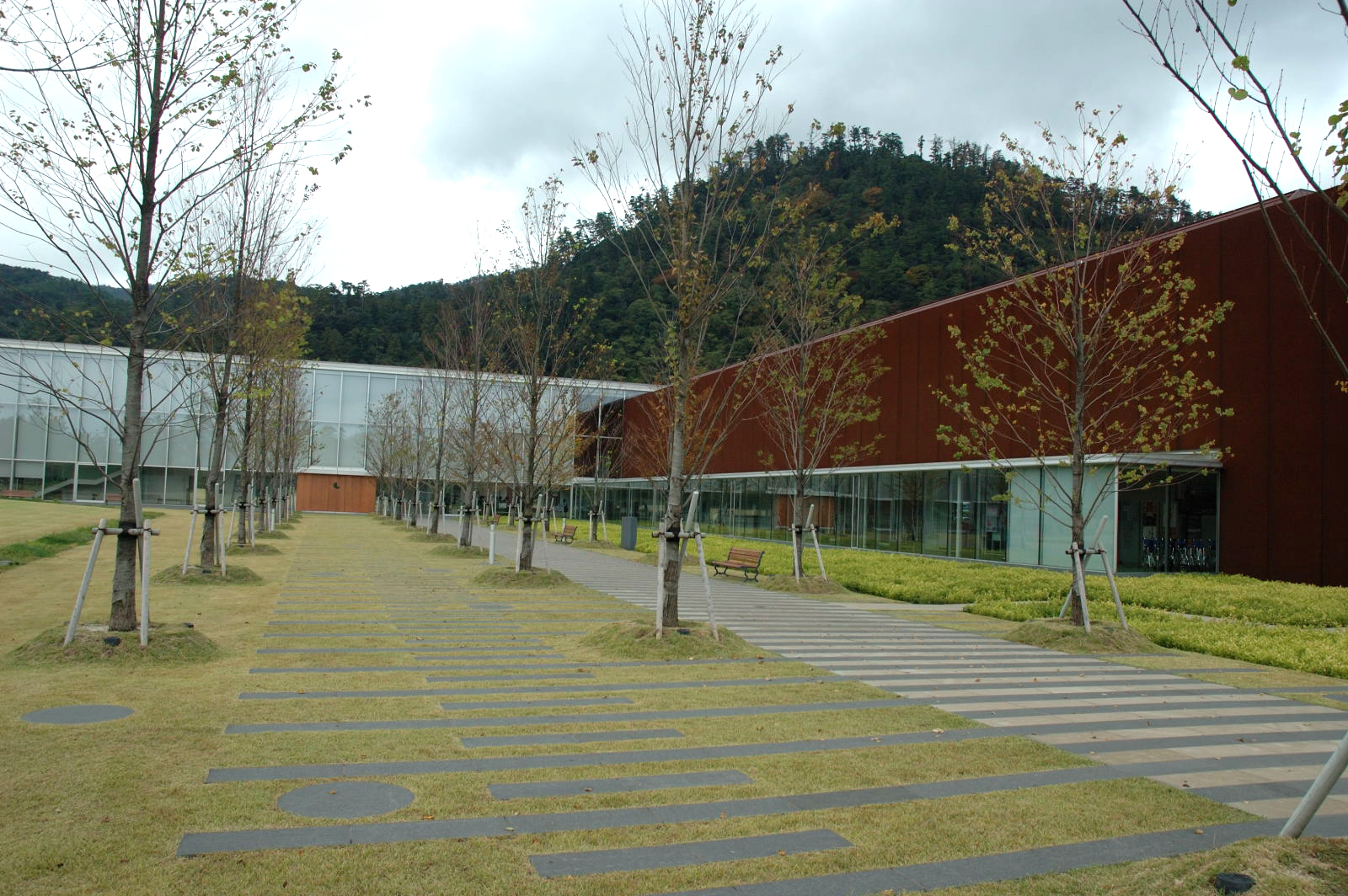
Shimane Museum of Ancient Izumo, Shimane Japan

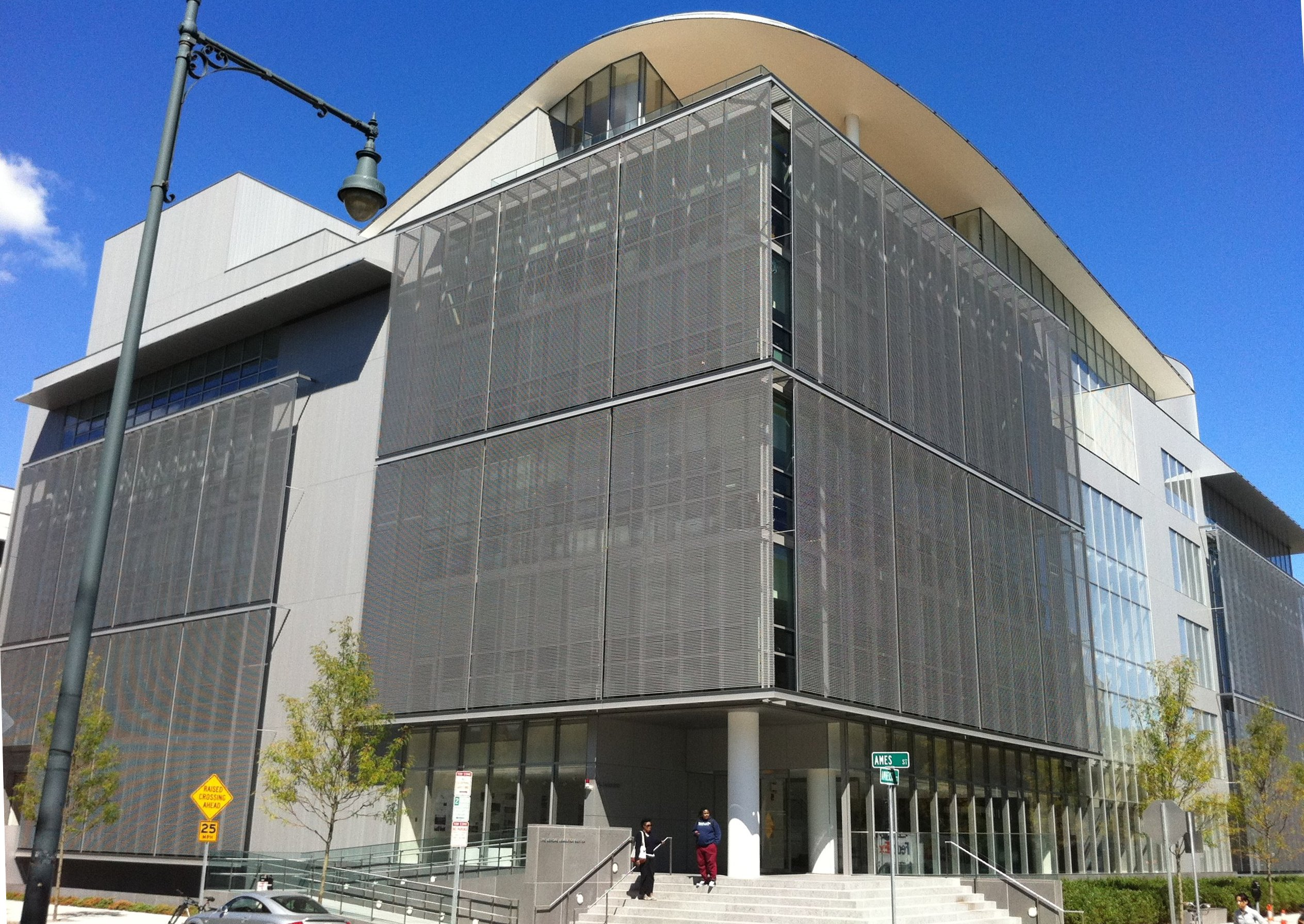
MIT Media Lab Extension, Cambridge, Massachusetts (2009)

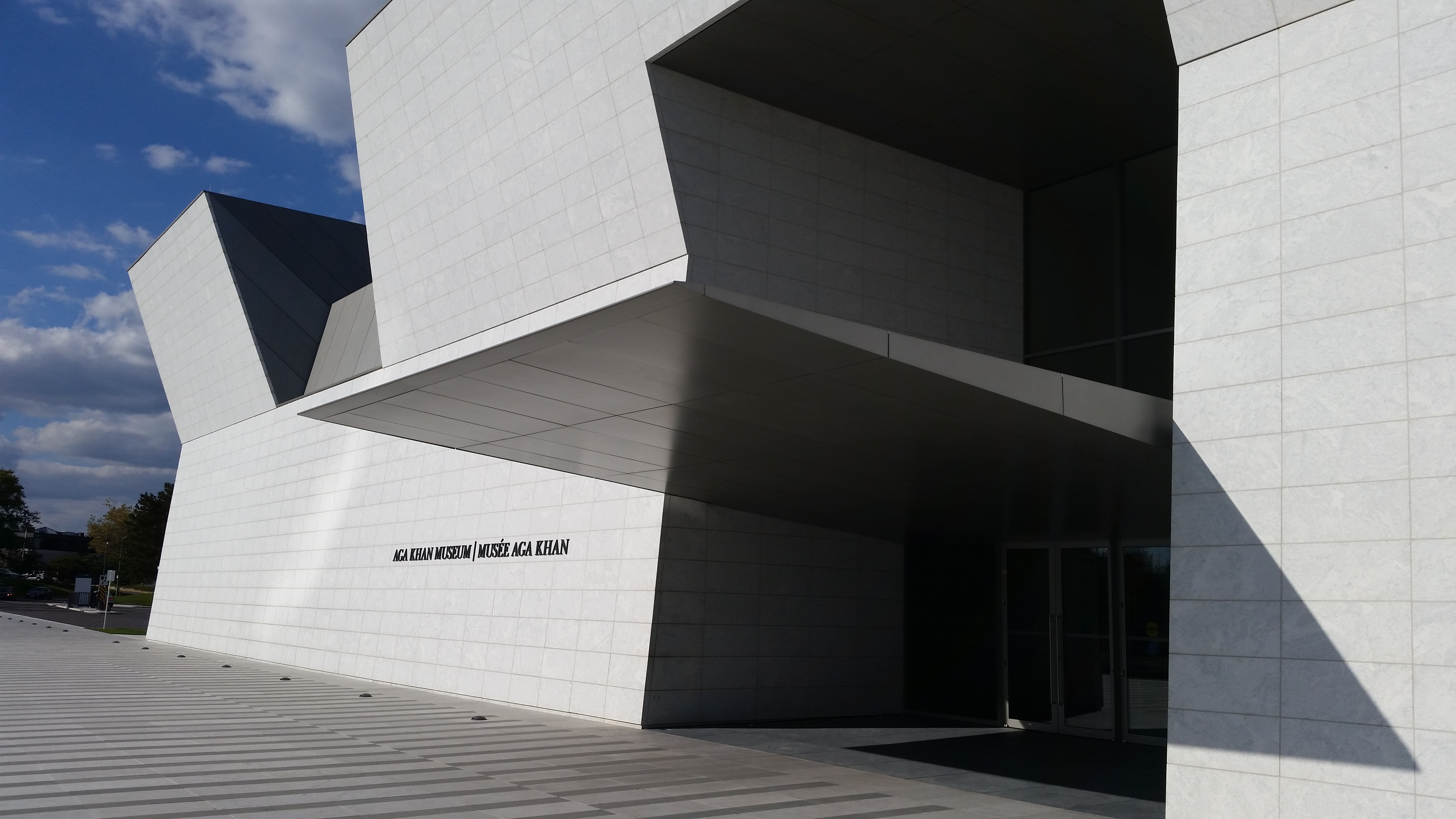
Aga Khan Museum, Toronto (2014)

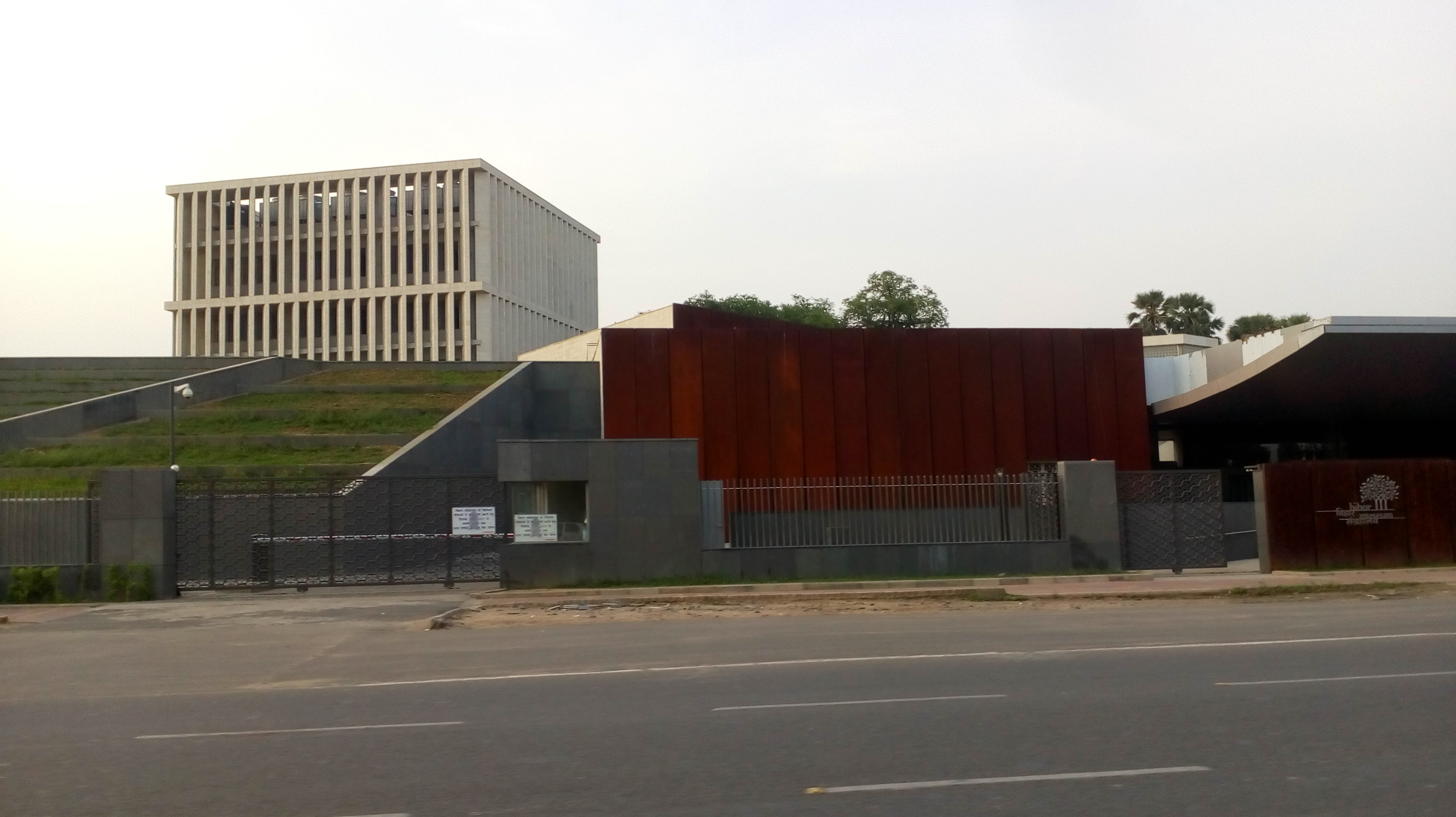
Bihar Museum, Patna (2015)

== Awards ==
- 1988: Wolf Prize in Arts
- 1993: Pritzker Architecture Prize
- 1993: International Union of Architects Gold Medal
- 1999: Praemium Imperiale
- 2011: AIA Gold Medal
