= 10th Street galleries =

Former galleries in New York

- Named after: A collective term for the East Village's co-operative galleries in the 1950s and 60s
- Successor: The Soho gallery scene and the Chelsea galleries
- Founders: Artist-run
- Founded at: East Side of Manhattan
- Type: Non-profit
- Purpose: To provide an avant-garde alternative to more conservative and conventional Madison Ave. and 57th St. galleries
- Headquarters: New York, NY
- Location: East Village
- Origins: Outgrowth of the Downtown Group, which evolved into The Club: Painters and sculptors who lived/worked in Downtown Manhattan
- Services: Organizing exhibitions, selling and promoting art
- Volunteers: Other artists

The 10th Street galleries was a collective term for the co-operative galleries that operated mainly in the East Village on the east side of Manhattan, in New York City in the 1950s and 1960s. The galleries were artist run and generally operated on very low budgets, often without any staff. Some artists became members of more than one gallery. The 10th Street galleries were an avant-garde alternative to the Madison Avenue and 57th Street galleries that were both conservative and highly selective.

== History ==
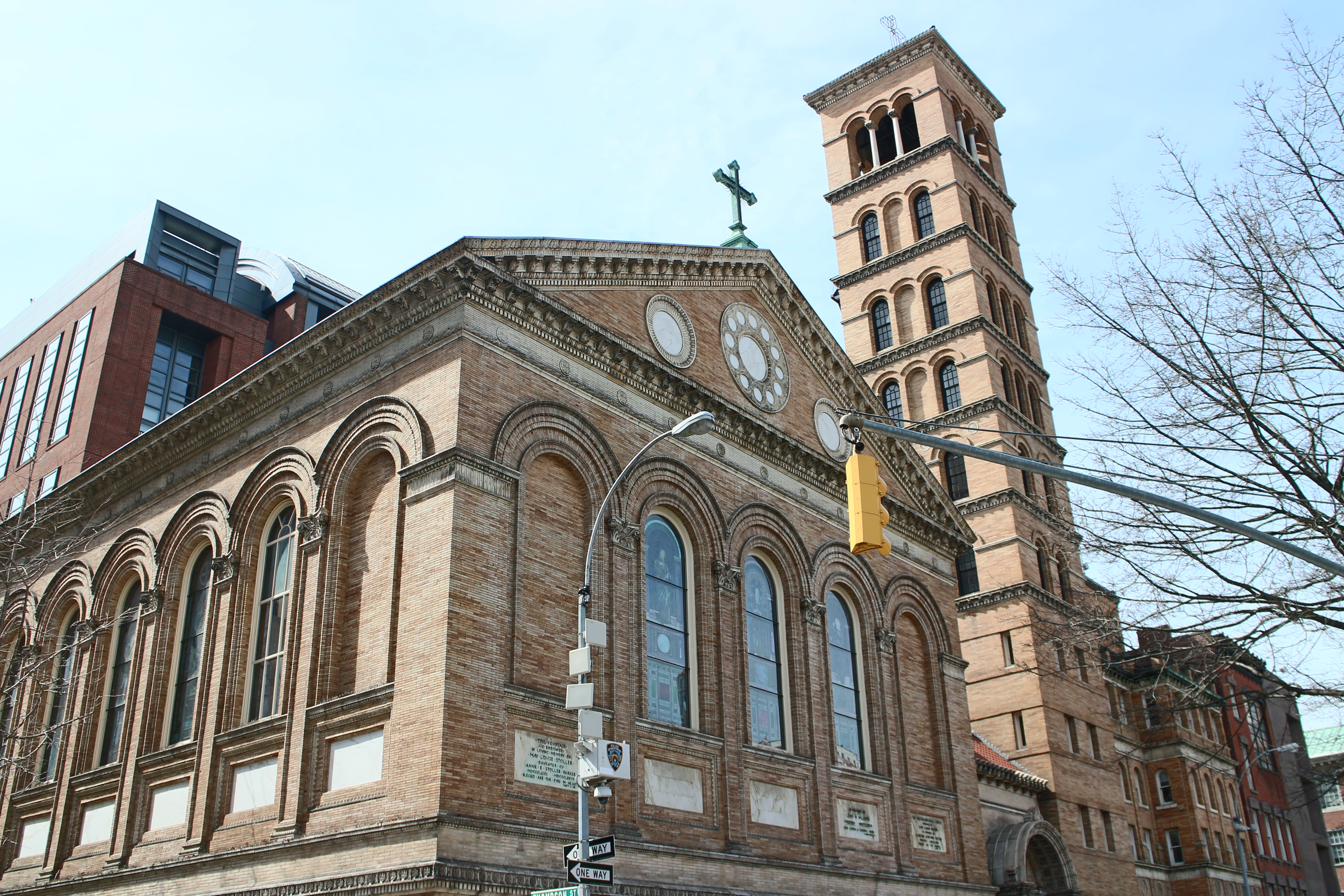
The Judson Memorial Church, photographed in 2017, housed a non-cooperative gallery, and was part of the Tenth Street Scene.

=== The Neighborhood ===
In New York City, from the early 1950s through the mid-1960s (and beyond), many galleries began as an outgrowth of an artistic community that had sprung up in a particular area of downtown Manhattan. The streets between 8th Street and 14th Street between Fifth and Third Avenues attracted many serious painters and sculptors where studio and living space could be found at a relatively inexpensive cost. Author Morgan Falconer describes it this way for the Royal Academy of Art Blog:

[A]rtists lived and worked around them" ... and although "[t]he backdrop was dull – pool rooms, an employment agency, a metal-stamping factory – but the mood lively and do-it-yourself.... One visitor to a group show in 1951 remembered sheltering from the summer heat under a sign painted by Kline.... By day the artists would work, by night they would frequent "The Club", their private talking-shop, or dance in someone's studio – the tango, the jitterbug, even the kazatsky, the Russian folk dance beloved by Communists and Russophiles in the 1930s.

Finding the audience for vanguard contemporary art to be small and the venues in which to show few, artists began to band together to launch and maintain galleries as a solution to the lack of other showing opportunities. Thus began a neighborhood in which several (some now legendary) co-operative galleries were formed, and a few non co-operative galleries as well.

Many of the artists who showed in these galleries, which are often referred to as the 10th Street Co-ops or the 10th Street Scene, have since become well known. Other artists who showed in these galleries are still under known, but in many cases have continued to work with zeal and dedication whether or not they are now famous. Some of the most well-known galleries that made the area what it was were: the Tanager Gallery, The March Gallery, The Hansa Gallery, The Brata Gallery, The James Gallery, The Phoenix Gallery, The Camino Gallery, and the Area Gallery. Although the 10th Street galleries have almost all closed, the Phoenix Gallery remains albeit in a new location and with a new membership.

=== The Artists ===
"Approximately 250 artists were dues-paying members of these co-operative galleries between 1952 and 1962. More than 500 artists and possibly close to 1000 artists exhibited on Tenth Street during those years." Several older and more established artists such as Willem de Kooning, Franz Kline and Milton Resnick maintained studios nearby, and often served a supporting role for the many younger artists who gravitated to this scene.

During the most active years of the 10th Street cooperatives, sculptors William King, David Slivka, James Rosati, George Spaventa, Sidney Geist, Israel Levitan, Gabriel Kohn, and Raymond Rocklin, became known as representatives of the 10th Street style of sculpture, even though there was remarkable diversity in their work.

Other galleries associated with the area and the time were the Fleischman Gallery, the Nonagon Gallery, the Reuben Gallery, the Terrain Gallery and the gallery at the Judson Church, which were not co-operatives.

The galleries on and nearby 10th Street played a significant part in the growth of American art and in the diversification of styles that are evident in the art world of today. The 10th Street scene was also a social scene, and openings often happened simultaneously on common opening days. This afforded a way for many artists to mingle with each other and the writers, poets, curators and occasional collectors who gravitated to the scene. The artists and galleries that made up the 10th Street scene were a direct predecessor to the SoHo gallery scene and the more recent Chelsea galleries.

==== By Photo ====
(Selection was limited by availability.)

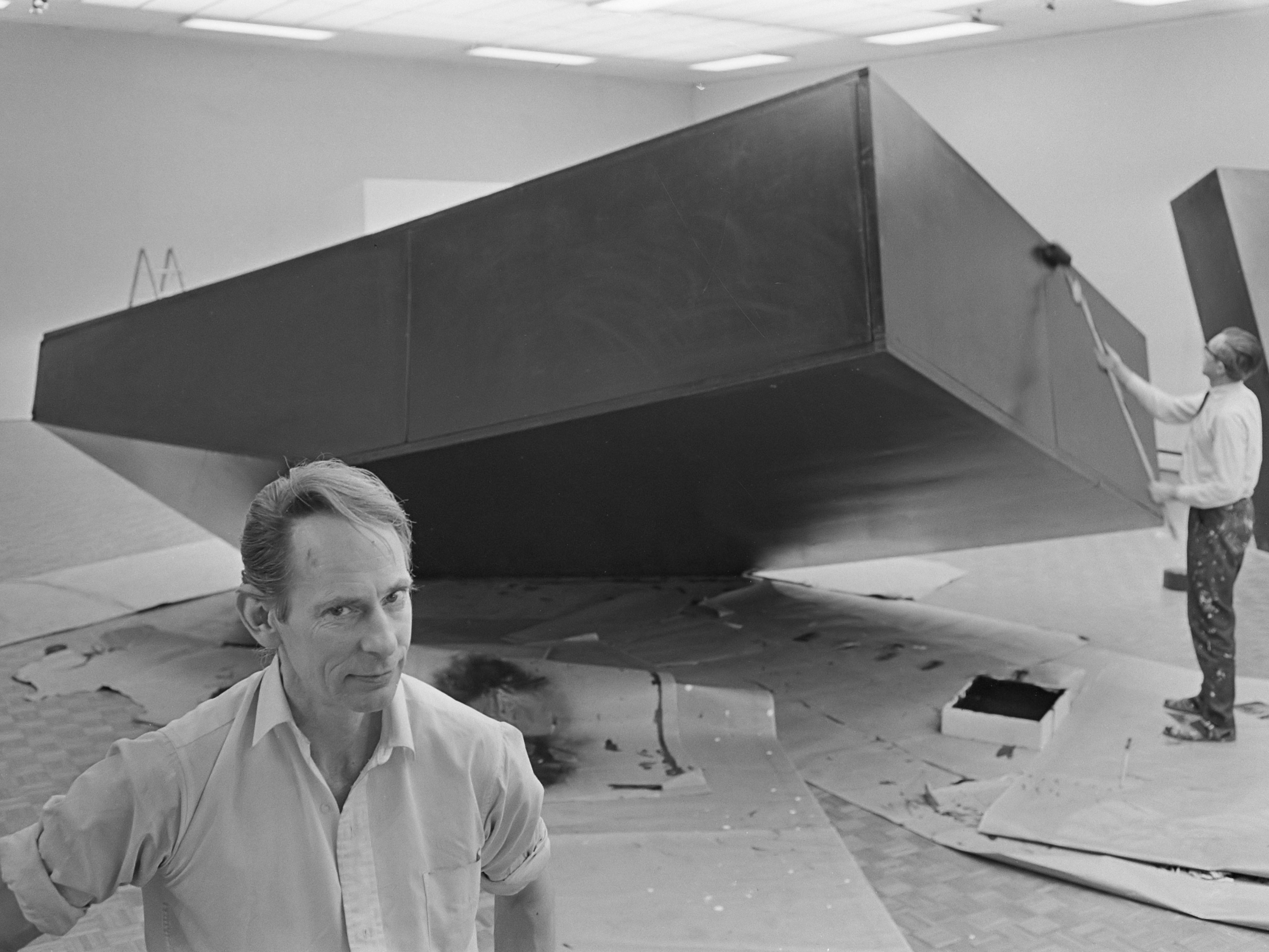
Sculptor Ronald Bladen, photographed in 1968, was a member of the Brata Gallery.

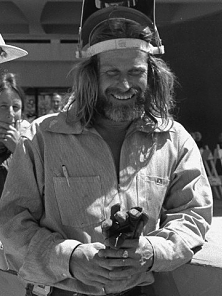
Sculptor Mark di Suvero, pictured in 1978, was a member of the March Gallery.

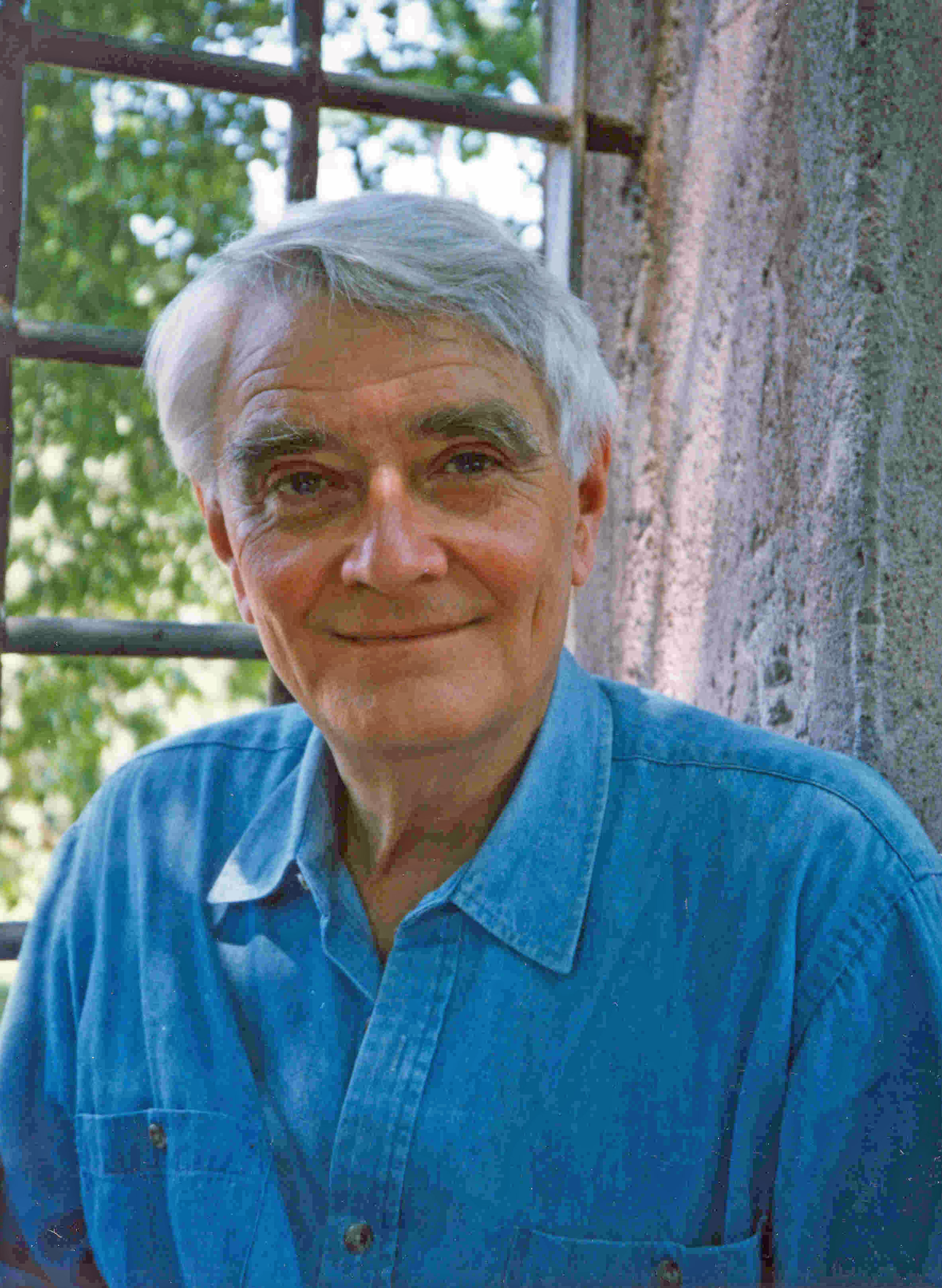
Artist Budd Hopkins, pictured in 1997, was a member of the March Gallery.

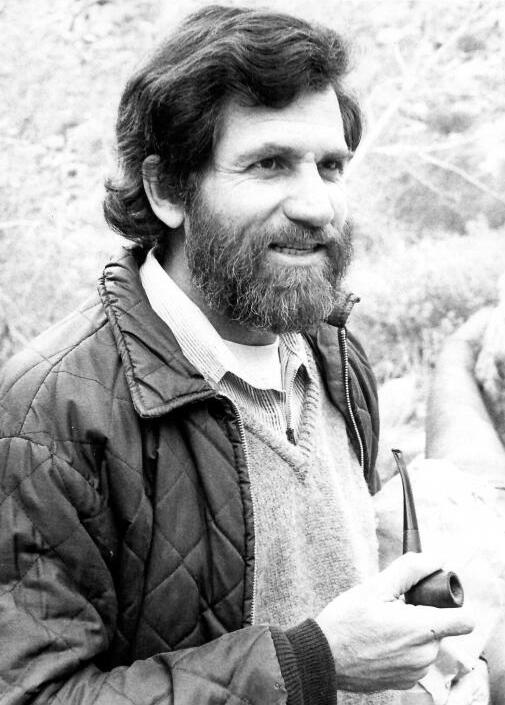
Painter and performance artist Allan Kaprow was a member of the Hansa Gallery.

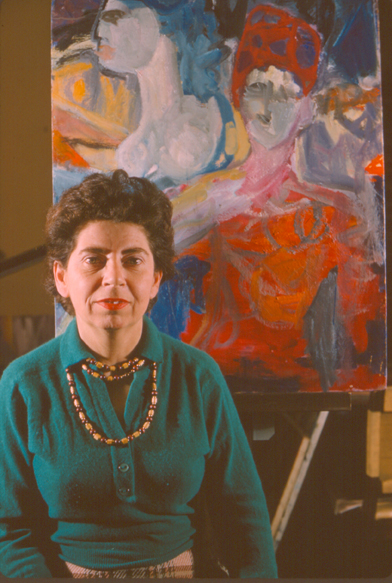
Painter Miriam Laufer, pictured in 1962, is a member of the Phoenix Gallery.

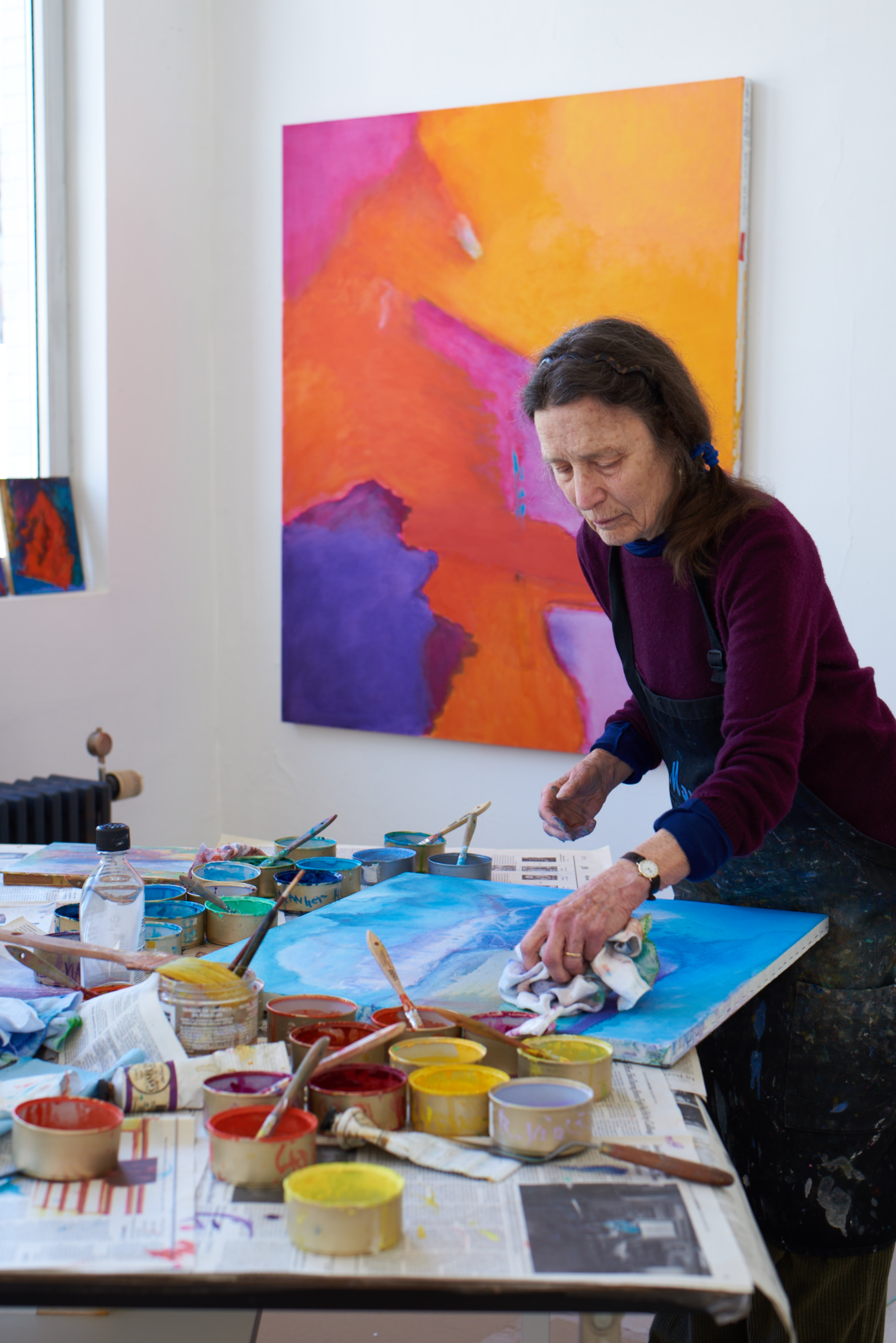
Painter Emily Mason, photographed in 2016, was a member of the Area Gallery.

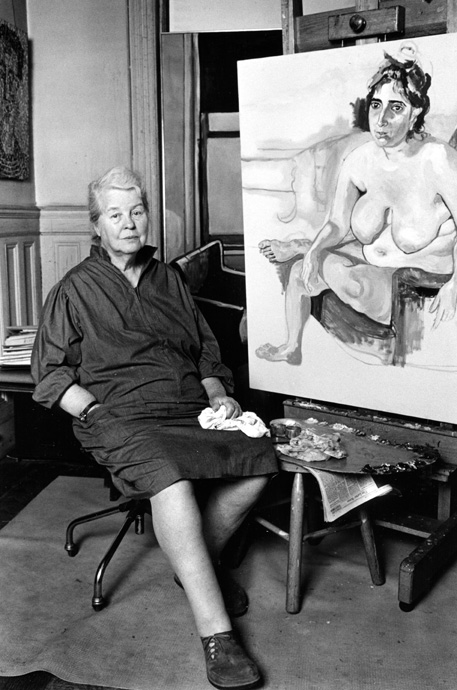
Painter Alice Neel was a member of the Camino Gallery.

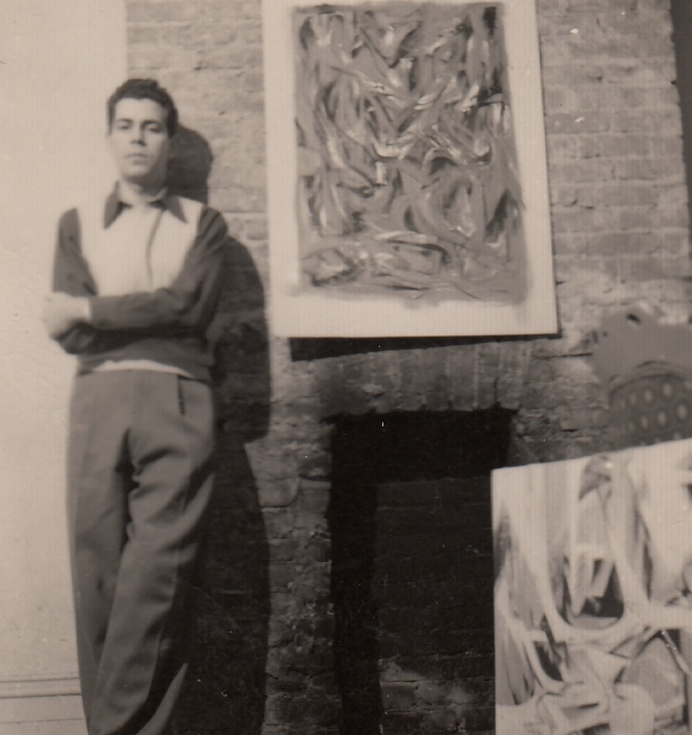
Painter Ray Spillenger was an original member of the March Gallery.

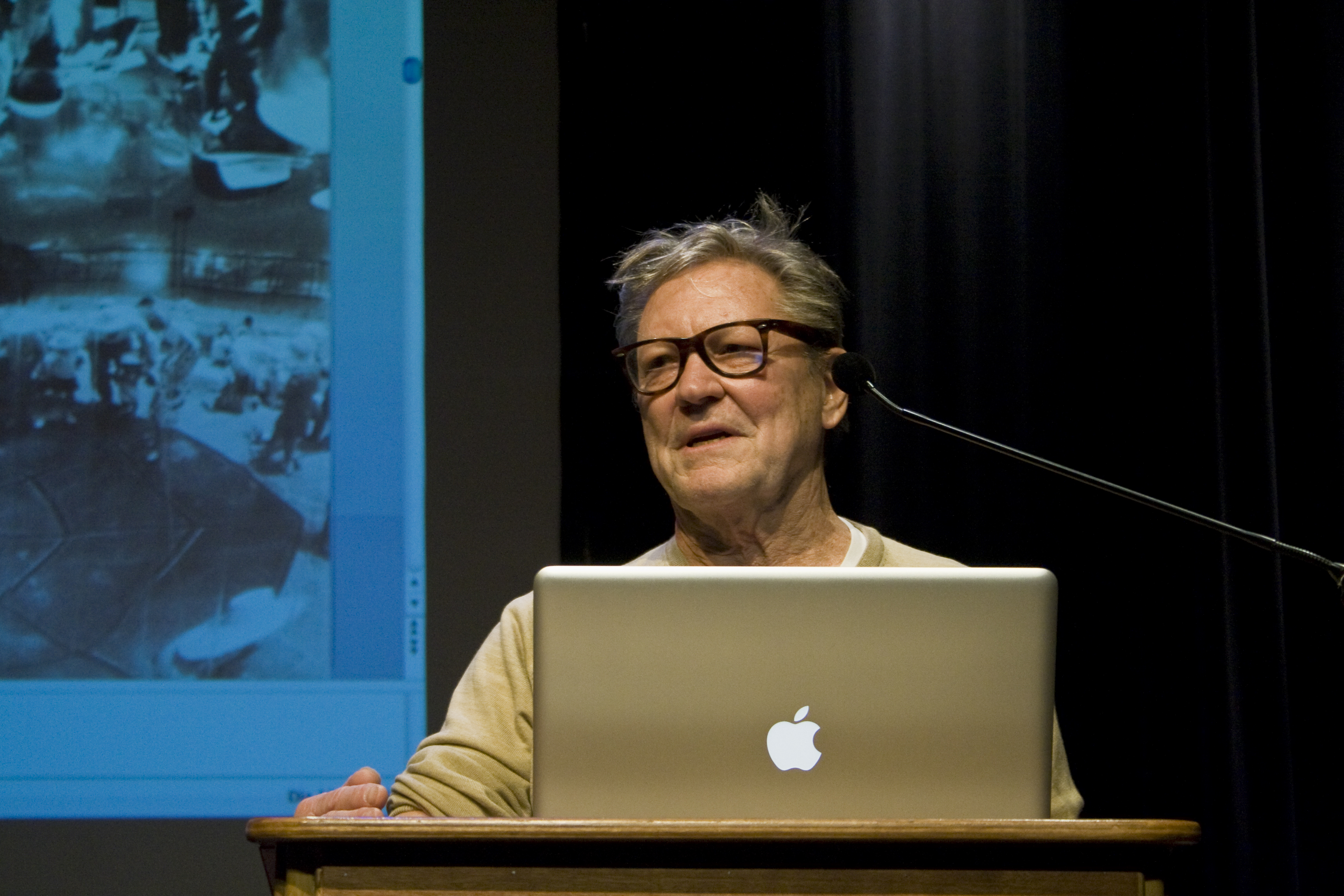
Multimedia artist Robert Whitman, photographed in 2010, was a member of the Hansa Gallery.

==== By Representative work ====
(Selection was limited by availability.)

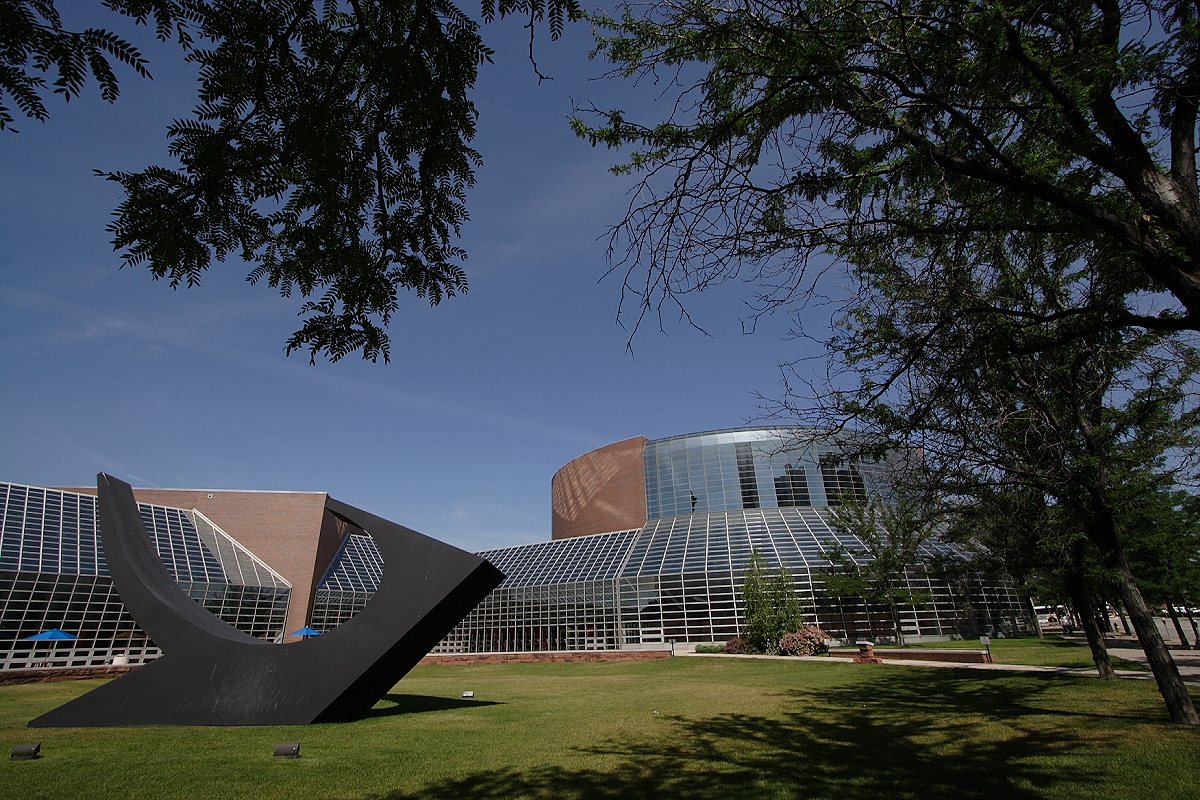
The sculpture "Sonar Tide," in front of the Peoria Civic Center is by Ronald Bladen. He was a member of the Brata Gallery.

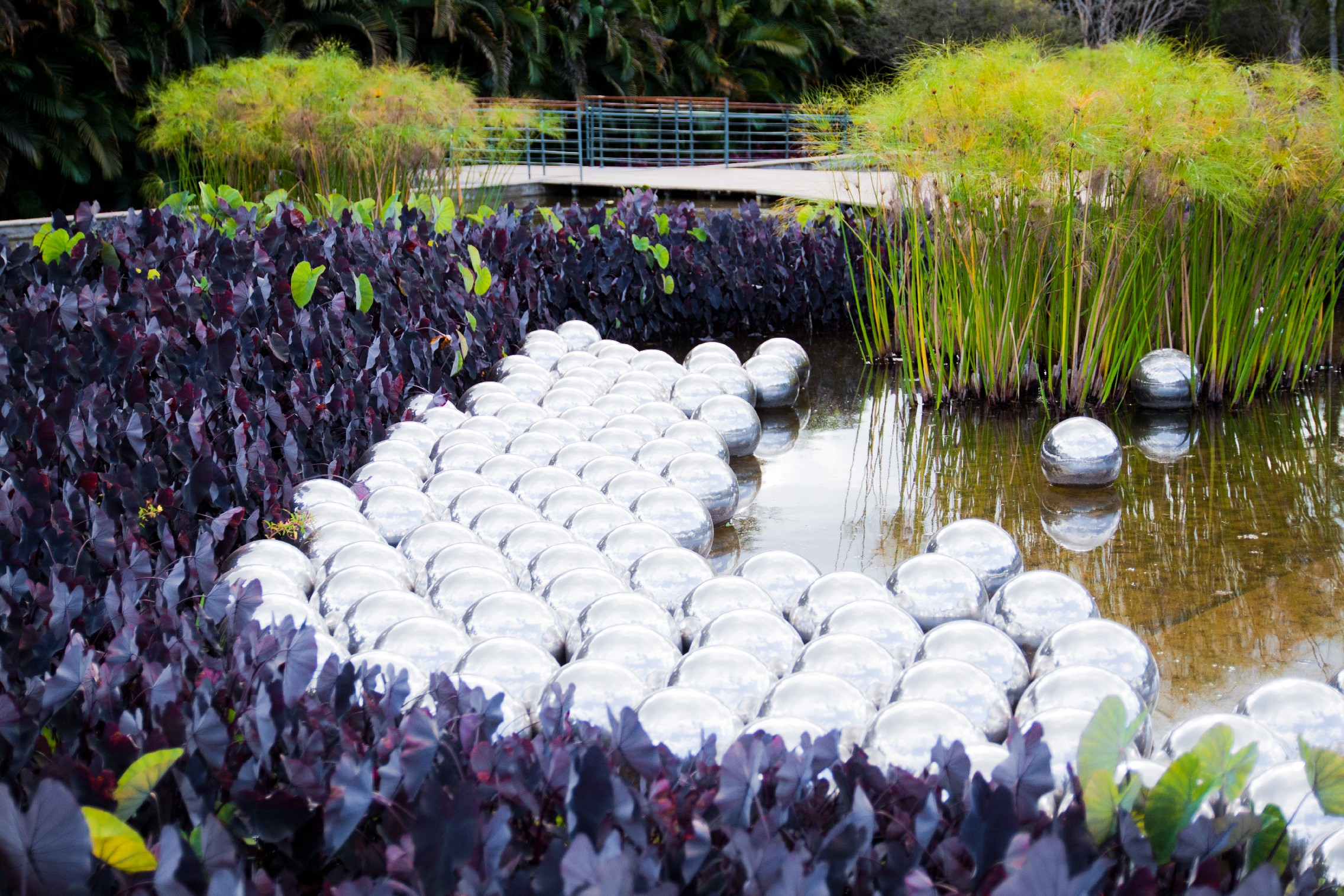
The art installation "Narcissus Garden" by Yayoi Kusama is displayed in Brumadinho/Brazil. She was a member of the Brata Gallery.

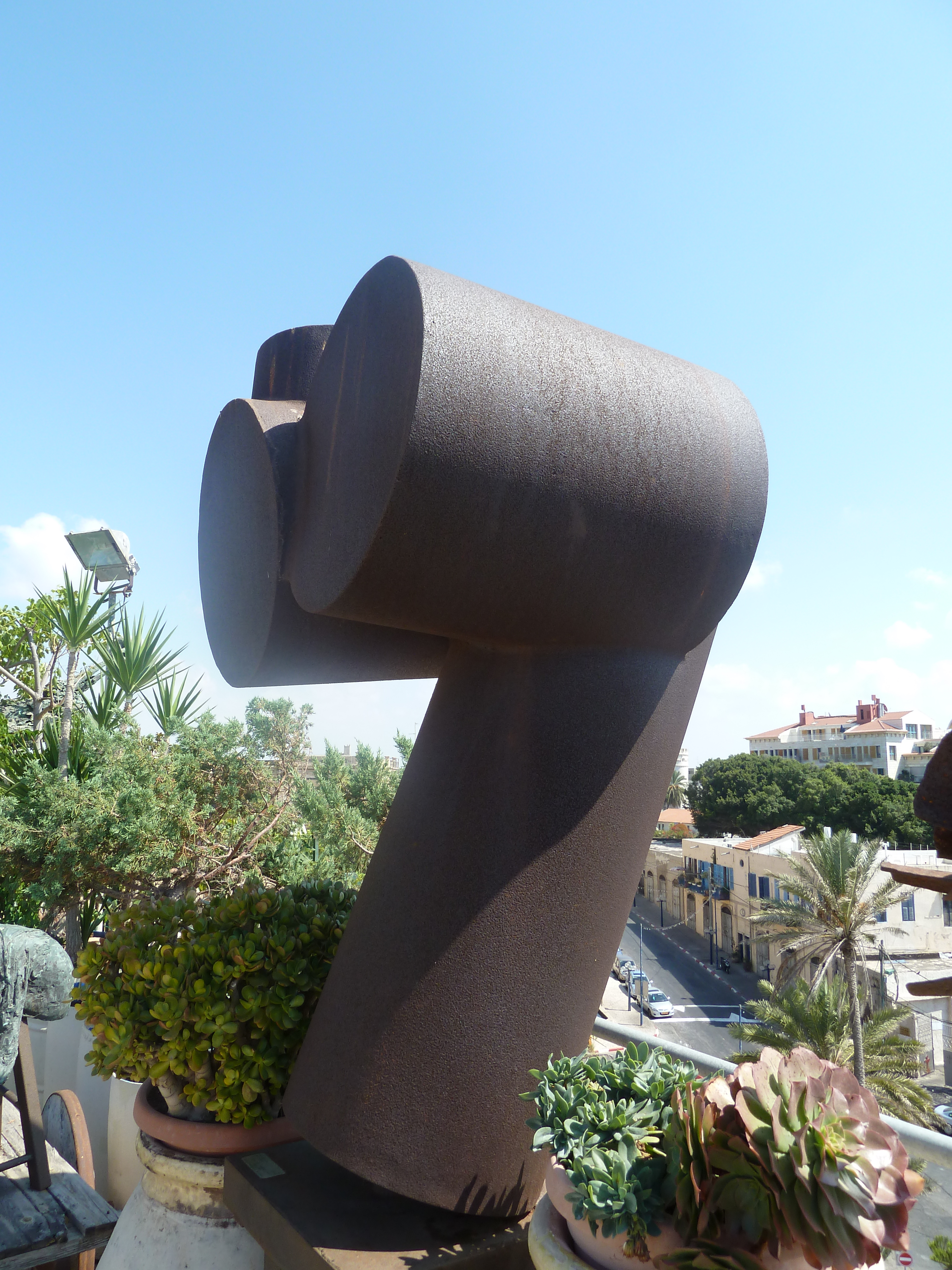
Sculptor Richard Stankiewicz created "Miracle in the Scrap Heap," which his now displayed at the Ilana Goor Museum in Jaffa, Israel. He was a member of the Hansa Gallery.

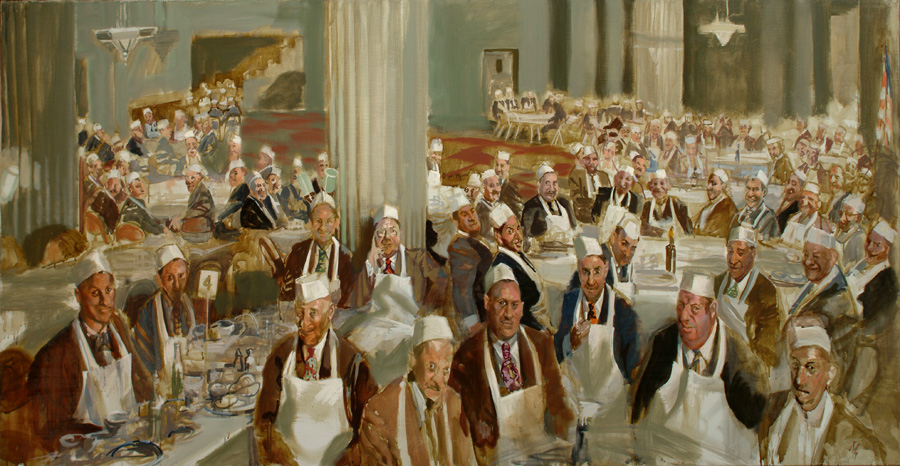
Frank Stout painted "The Lobster Convention." He was a member of the Tanager Gallery.

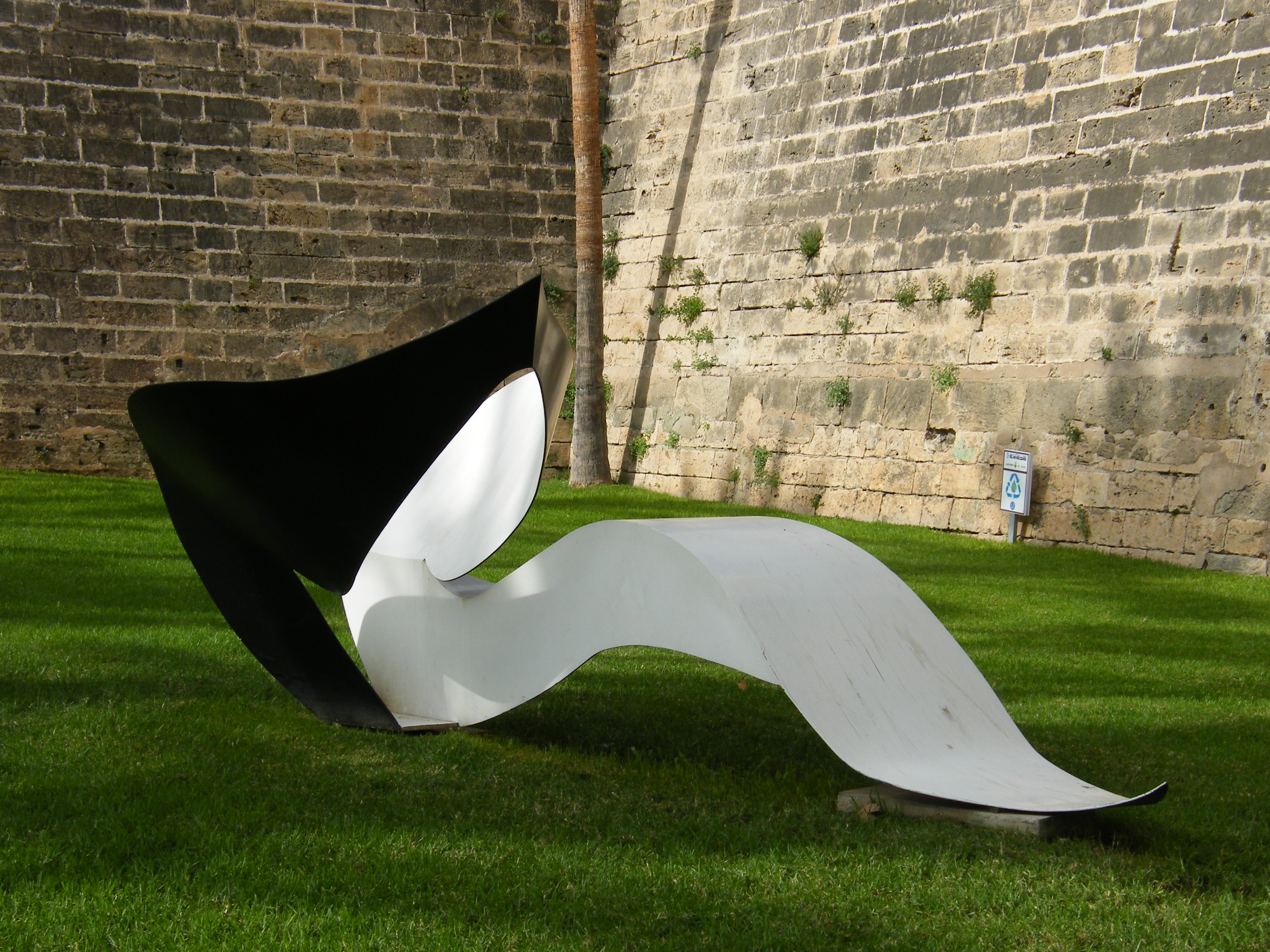
The Sculpture "Negro y blanco horizontalNegro y blanco horizontal" was created between 1993 and 1999 by George Sugarman. It is displayed in Palma de Mallorca, Spain. He was a member of the Brata Gallery.

== Tanager Gallery, 1952–1962 ==
=== Locations ===
- Fall 1953 – summer 1962 at 90 East 10th Street
- Summer 1952 – fall 1953 at 51 East 4th Street

=== Members ===
- Charles Cajori (founder)
- Lois Dodd (founder)
- Perle Fine
- Sidney Geist
- Joseph Groell
- Nanno de Groot
- Sally Hazelet Drummond
- Angelo Ippolito (founder)
- Ben Isquith
- Lester Johnson
- Alex Katz
- Wiliam King (founder)
- Nicholas Marsicano
- Fred Mitchell (founder)
- George Earl Ortman
- Philip Pearlstein
- Edith Schloss
- Frank Stout
- Raymond Rocklin
- Sal Sirugo
- Tom Wesselmann
- Mary Abbott
- Charlotte Park

== Hansa Gallery, 1952–1959 ==
=== Locations ===
- Fall 1952 − fall 1954 at 70 East 12th Street
- Fall 1954 − summer 1959 at 210 Central Park South

=== Members ===
- Edward Avedisian
- Maurice Barr
- Jacques Beckwith (original member)
- Robert Beauchamp
- Lilly Brody
- Jean Follett (original member)
- Barbara Forst (original member)
- Miles Forst (original member)
- Hedi Fuchs
- Paul Georges
- John Gruen (original member)
- Dan Haugard
- Wolf Kahn (original member)
- Allan Kaprow (original member)
- Fay Lansner
- Andrew Martin
- Dody Muller
- Jan Müller (original member)
- Felix Pasillis (original member)
- George Segal
- Arnold Singer (original member)
- Richard Stankiewicz (original member)
- Myron Stout
- Robert Whitman
- Jane Wilson (original member)

=== Directors ===
- Richard Bellamy and Ivan Karp

== James Gallery, 1954–1962 ==
=== Locations ===
- Fall 1954 – summer 1962 at 70 East 12th Street

=== Members ===
- Rita Deanin Abbey
- Margaret Bartlett (original member)
- James Billmyer (original member)
- Nieves Marshalek Billmyer (original member)
- Betty Biship
- M.L. Bonnell
- Dorothy Eisner
- Stan Freborg
- William Freed (original member)
- James Gahagan (founder)
- Tom Hannan (original member)
- Phillip Harrington (original member)
- Myrna Harrison (original member)
- Robert Henry (original member)
- Alice Hodges
- Robert Kaupelis
- Robert La Hotan
- Gene Lesser (original member)
- Arthur Lieneck
- Charles Littler (founder)
- Alvin Most (original member)
- Haynes Ownby (original member)

== Camino Gallery, 1956–1963 ==
=== Locations ===
- Fall 1956 – Fall 1960 at 92 East 10th Street
- Fall 1960 – Fall 1963 at 89 East 10th Street

=== Members ===
- Ruth Abrams (original member)
- Anneli Arms
- S. Beerman
- Theodore Brenson
- Art Brenner
- Kenneth Campbell
- Francis Celentano
- Jean Clad
- Joe Clark
- Ross Coates
- Sally Cook
- Daniel Cowan
- John Curoi
- Don David (original member)
- Leff Deffebach
- Elaine de Kooning
- Lester Elliot
- Alice Forman
- Connie Fox-Boyd
- Andree Golbin (original member)
- Sam Goodman (original member)
- Raymond Hendler
- Jorge Goya-Lukich
- Philip Held
- Jon Henry
- Stanton Kreider (original member)
- John Krushenick (original member)
- Nicholas Krushenick (original member)
- Don Kunz
- June Lathrop
- Aaron Levy
- Len Meiselman
- Alice Neel
- Bart Perry (original member)
- Jack Arnold Rabinowitz
- Elaine Booth Selig
- Gertrude Shibley
- Sal Sirugo
- Pat Sloane
- Leon Polk Smith
- Paul Waldman
- Alida Walsh
- Jo Warner
- Samuel G. Weiner (original member)
- Florence Weinstein (original member)

The Camino closed in November 1963. At that time, six members (Alice Forman, Philip Held, Aaron Levy, Gertrude Shibley, Alida Walsh, Florence Weinstein) joined the Phoenix Gallery, which had moved uptown to 939 Madison Avenue.

=== Directors ===
- Howard Rackliff
- Bruno Palmer-Poroner
- Bruce Glaser
- David Feinstein
- David Rosenberg
- Margot Sylvestre

== March Gallery, 1957–1962 ==
=== Locations ===
- March 1957 – January 1962 at 95 East 10th Street

=== Members ===
- Lennart Anderson
- Gerald Andrea
- Rocco Armento (original member)
- Anne Arnold
- Alice Baber (original member)
- Waldemar Baranowski (original member)
- Robert Beauchamp (original member)
- June Corwine (original member)
- Elaine de Kooning
- Mark di Suvero
- Francine Fels (Felsenthal) (original member)
- William Gambini (original member)
- Joann Gedney (original member)
- Paul Georges
- Burt Green
- Burt Hassen (original member)
- Bob Hauge
- Raymond Hendler
- Budd Hopkins (original member)
- Richard Ireland (original member)
- Lester Johnson (original member)
- Matsumi Kanemitsu (original member)
- Richard Klix
- Gesha Kurakin
- David Lund (original member)
- Boris Lurie (original member)
- Marcia Marcus (original member)
- Joan Mathews
- Hugh Mesibov
- Steve Montgomery (original member)
- Felix Pasilis (founder)
- Patricia Passlof (original member)
- Leo Rabkin
- Wallace Reiss (original member)
- Marlene Schwanzel
- Bill Seibring
- Ray Spillenger (original member)
- Peter Stander (original member)
- Robert Tannen
- Yvonne Thomas
- Bob Tieman
- Beate Wheeler
- Tom Young (original member)
- Mario Yrisarry
- Anthe Zacharias
- Athos Zacharias
- Wilfrid Zogbaum (original member)

== Brata Gallery, 1957 – mid-1960s ==
=== Locations ===
- 1957 – mid-1960s at 89 East 10th Street

=== Members ===
- Takeshi Aseda (original member)
- Dick Ahr
- Rex Ashlock
- Sal Barone
- Ronald Bladen (original member)
- Ed Bleicher
- Edward Clark (original member)
- Bill Creston (original member)
- Berenice D'Vorzon (original member)
- John Dunlop
- Peter Forakis
- Joseph Feldman (original member)
- Harold Goldstein
- Al Held (original member)
- Roger Jorgensen
- Franz Kline (original member)
- Robert Kobayashi (original member)
- Joseph Konzai (original member)
- John Krushenick (founder)
- Nicholas Krushenick (founder)
- Yayoi Kusama (original member)
- Nanae Momiyama (original member)
- Frank Montgomery
- David Owens
- Jack Arnold Rabinowitz (original member)
- Salvatore M. Romano (original member)
- David Seccombe
- Frank Sepa
- William P. Sildar
- Hal Silvermintz
- Nico D. Smith
- Patricia Stegman
- Knute Stiles (original member)
- Sylvia Stone
- George Sugarman (original member)
- Julius Tobias (original member)
- Louis Trakis (original member)
- Wilhelmina Van Ness
- Felix Welensky (original member)

== Phoenix Gallery, 1958–present ==
=== Locations ===
- October 2014−present at 548 West 28th Street
- 2003−fall 2014 at 210 Eleventh Avenue
- 1977−2003 at 560 Broadway
- June 1977 at 30 West 57th Street
- January 1963−May 1977 at 939 Madison Avenue
- October 1958−December 1962 at 40 Third Avenue

=== Members ===
- Isser Aronovici (founder)
- Jean Auger
- Frank Bernaducci
- John Blake
- Michael Boyd
- Francis Celentano
- John Civitello
- Joe Clark
- Sally Cook
- James Cuchiara (original member)
- Marsha Dale (Gurell) (original member)
- Helen Daphnis-Avalon (original member)
- Leon de Leeuw
- Michael Donohue (original member)
- Annick du Charme
- George Englehart
- Blossom Esainko (original member)
- Marlyn Fein
- Cecily Barth Firestein (member since 10th Street)
- John Fischer
- Irwin Feeminger (original member)
- Ed Golik
- Karen Greenberg (original member)
- Red Grooms (original member)
- Judith Hart
- Pat Hartman
- John Hoffer (original member)
- Pierre Jacquemon
- Lenore Jaffee (founder)
- Edwin Jastram (original member)
- Francis Jennings
- Ted Joans (original member)
- John Kazann (original member)
- Robert Kohls
- Miriam Laufer
- Michael Leff
- Ann Leiter-Larsen
- Tom Lenihan
- Eleanore Lockspeiser (member since 10th Street)
- Robert Ludwig
- James Martin (original member)
- Jay Milder (original member)
- Earle Miller
- William Pellicone
- George Preston
- Gwytha Pring
- Arnold Price
- John Pupura
- Ingrid Rehert
- Marlyn Ries
- John Servetas (original member)
- Herbert Simon
- Helen Soreff
- Natalie Sterinbach
- Robert Wiegand
- Gerald Willen
- Ralph Wehrenberg
- Peter Wrangel
- Frank Yee
- Zalmar

== Area Gallery, 1958–1965 ==
=== Locations ===
- Fall 1958 – Summer 1962 at 80 East 10th Street
- Fall 1962 – Summer 1965 at 90 East 10th Street

=== Members ===
- Harvey Becker
- Tom Boutis (original member)
- Lydia Brown
- Jean Cohen
- John Ireland Colins (original member)
- Charles DuBack (original member)
- Joe Fiore (original member)
- Ruth Fortel
- Norman Kanter (original member)
- Tom Kendall
- Bernard Langlais (original member)
- Ellen Leelike
- Emily Mason
- Ernest Marciano
- Doris Matthews
- Ed Moses (original member)
- Daphne Mumford (original member)
- Gordon Press
- Philip Russell
- Selina Trieff
- Nadine Valenti
- Conni Whidden
- Marjorie Windust
- Paul Yakovenko (original member)

== See also ==
- Artist cooperative
- Artist-run initiative
- Artist-run space
- Abstract expressionism
- Park Place Gallery
