= Charles Steven DuBack =

American artist

Charles Steven DuBack (March 10, 1926 – October 22, 2015) was an American artist, known for his large-scale paintings, collage and drawings.

In 2003, Charles DuBack described his artistic development as a process of becoming more experimental and stated that as his career progressed, he aimed to move away from formal rules and return to simple style of his early life.

== Early life and career ==
Charles DuBack was born on March 10, 1926, to Czechoslovak parents Charles and Cecilia DuBack in Fairfield, Connecticut. He was the eldest of ten children. His father worked as a baker, and DuBack assisted in the bakery as a teenager. After high school, Charles DuBack volunteered with the U.S.Navy from 1944 to 1946, during World War II, where he served in the Amphibious Force through 3 invasions in the Pacific Theatre.

On the G.I. Bill, DuBack attended the Whitney School of Fine Art in New Haven, Connecticut, and the Newark School of Fine Arts in Newark, New Jersey, and the Brooklyn Museum Art School, in Brooklyn, NY. He attended Skowhegan School of Painting and Sculpture in Maine for five summers beginning in 1950, where he met fellow artists and friends Bernard “Blackie” Langlais, Lois Dodd and Alex Katz, as well as Daphne Mumford (b. 1934) whom would later become his wife in 1953. Skowhegan is where his affection for Maine began.

As young artists in the early 1950s, DuBack and Mumford lived in Manhattan, sharing a studio building at 212 W 28th street on the first floor, above a working lumber yard, with Bernard Langlais (3rd floor) and Alex Katz (2nd floor).

Together, with friends Tom Boutis, Joe Fiore, Ed Moses, Bernard Langlais, Paul Yakovenko, Norman Kanter, and John Ireland Colins, they founded Area Gallery in 1958 on East 10th street — part of the artist-run co-operative 10th Street galleries. Area Gallery closed in 1965. In 1972 DuBack co-founded Landmark Gallery at 469 Broome Street in SoHo, with artists Sideo Fromboluti, Jean Cohen, Nora Speyer, Tom Boutis, and Daphne Mumford however Landmark Gallery closed in 1982.

Like many artists who developed ties to the Maine coast, Charles DuBack and Daphne Mumford purchased a summer home in North Waldoboro, Maine, in 1954, then in Tenants Harbor, Maine, in 1965. DuBack ultimately left New York City in 1990 to work in his home/studio in Tenants Harbor, on the Saint George River, until his death on October 22, 2015, at the age of 89. DuBack had two daughters with Mumford: Amanda (b. 1954), and Cora (b. 1956), both of whom were featured in many of his earlier figurative paintings.

== Work ==
Charles DuBack's stylistic progression ranged from color fields to portraits, landscape, and finally to “notational” abstractions. He asserted throughout his career that he was a Realist, as “All of my work comes directly from nature.”

Many of DuBack's early paintings were large-scale landscapes and figurative, group portraits of family or friends. For example, Happy New Year, 1961, in the permanent collection of Colby College,* features Bernard and Helen Langlais, John Grillo, Sasson and Shirley Soffer, Daphne Mumford, and DuBack himself. Some pieces included sculptural elements — figures in wood and fabric — mounted to the canvas or board. An example of this resides in the public collection of the Portland Museum of Art: The Coopers, 1970.

From the late 1970s and 80s, DuBack primarily painted landscapes (without figures). In the January 1974 edition of ARTS magazine, Holland Cotter wrote: “….This sense of tension is, perhaps, the most remarkable quality in DuBack’s works. These beautiful landscapes, perfect in calculation yet ingenuous, embody a striving for both simplistic vision and unreflective, almost photographic attempts to contain 'what is'. These appositional perspectives produce an uneasy but successful marriage: the voices — violent, soft, ironic, transcendent — and always vibrantly and uniquely human.”

His final works were notational abstractions of nature — many imbued with the colors of the flora of the gulf coast of Florida, where he spent some winter months — bright, short slashes of color on large canvases.

=== Exhibitions ===
DuBack exhibited his work throughout his life; his first solo exhibition was with Roko Gallery in New York, in 1953, and was honored with a major retrospective more than 50 years later at the Portland Museum of Art, in 2009. Throughout his career his work was shown nationwide, including: the Center for Maine Contemporary Art in Rockport Maine (2003); The National Academy, New York (1992); The National Academy of Design, New York (1990, 1982); The Indianapolis Museum of Art, Indianapolis, Indiana (1978); P.S.1, New York (1977); The Landmark Gallery, New York (1972, 1982); Einhorn Auditorium (Skowhegan School of Painting and Sculpture), New York (1966); the Whitney Museum of American Art, New York (1959–60); the Brooklyn Museum, New York (1959, 1953); Bowdoin College, Maine (1957); Colby College (with Skowhegan School of Painting and Sculpture), Maine (1957).

=== Public collections ===
DuBack's work can be found in public collections nationwide, including: The Portland Museum of Art, Portland, ME; Colby College, Waterville, ME; Bowdoin College, Brunswick, ME; Lehman Brothers, NYC; Art in Embassies program, Washington, D.C.; Emory University, Atlanta, GA; Port Authority, NYC; Columbia Museum of Art, Columbia, SC; Citibank, NYC; The Butler Museum of American Art, CT; Westchester University, Westchester, PA; American University, Washington, D.C.
