= Fred Mitchell (artist) =

American artist (1923–2013)

- Born: Madison Fred Mitchell; November 24, 1923; Meridian, Mississippi
- Died: May 21, 2013 (aged 89); New York City
- Known for: Painting
- Movement: Abstract expressionism

Madison Fred Mitchell (November 24, 1923 – May 21, 2013) belonged to the New York School Abstract Expressionist artists whose influence and artistic innovation by the 1950s had been recognized around the world. New York School Abstract Expressionism, represented by Jackson Pollock, Willem de Kooning, Franz Kline and others became a leading art movement of the post-World War II era.

== Biography ==
Fred Mitchell was born November 24, 1923, in Meridian, Mississippi. Following graduation from Meridian High School, Mitchell attended the Carnegie Institute of Technology (now Carnegie Mellon University), until his studies were interrupted by military duty. After serving in the Army, Mitchell enrolled in the Cranbrook Academy of Art, where he eventually received his M.F.A.

He died New York City on May 21, 2013.

== Studied painting ==
- 1942-1943: Carnegie Institute of Technology, Pittsburgh, PA with scholarship
- 1948, 1950, 1951: Accademia di Belle Arti, Instituto Meschini, Rome, Italy
- 1948: Cranbrook Academy of Art, Bloomfield Hills, MI received BFA; Columbia University, New York City in summer; Atelier 17 with Stanley Hayter
- 1956: Cranbrook Academy of Art, Bloomfield Hills, MI received MFA

== Participation in the Downtown Art Scene ==
In 1947 Mitchell was the winner of Pepsi Cola cash award of $1,500; He sailed to Rome. During his visit to Rome he met painters John Heliker, Afro (Basadella), and Philip Guston, who had major influence on his work. Returning to the US, in 1951 Mitchell moved to New York City and became one of the first painters to open a painting studio in the downtown seaport area along the East River known as Coenties Slip (Manhattan). He soon joined the "Downtown Group" which represented a group of artists who found studios in lower Manhattan. In 1952 Mitchell, Angelo Ippolito, Lois Dodd, Charles Cajori and William King organized the Tanager Gallery, which belonged to the Tenth Street galleries. His friend Philip Pavia introduced Mitchell to 'The Club'.

== Teaching positions ==
Mitchell was also a highly regarded teacher:

- 1952–1954: Drawing and Painting, Neighborhood House, Riverdale. NY
- 1954: Finch College, NY; Founded Coenties Slip (Manhattan) School of Art
- 1956: Positano Art Workshop. Positano, Italy
- 1955–1959: Cranbrook Academy of Arts, Bloomfield Hills, Michigan
- 1961–1968: Downtown Art Center, Seamens Church Institute, Coenties Slip (Manhattan), NY
- 1961–1971: New York University
- 1968–1969: Cornell University, Ithaca, NY
- 1973–1974: Queens College, CUNY
- 1975–1980: Southern Tip School of Art, South Street Seaport, NY
- 1979–1983: Parsons School of Design Master of Fine Arts program, NY
- 1985–2003: Art Students League of New York;
- 1986–2000: Kingsborough Community College, City University, NY

== Selected solo exhibitions ==
- 1942, 1965: Municipal Gallery, Jackson, Mississippi
- 1953: Tanager Gallery, New York City
- 1954: Neighborhood House, New York, NY
- 1956: Positano Art Workshop, Positano, Italy
- 1958, 1960, 1961, 1963: Howard Wise Gallery, Cleveland, Ohio and New York
- 1964: "i" Gallery, La Jolla, CA
- 1965: Ford Foundation Award, Columbia Museum of Art, Columbia, SC
- 1966: Wooster Art Center, Danbury, Connecticut
- 1968: Wisconsin State University, Platteville
- 1972, 1988: Meridian Museum of Art, Meridian, Mississippi
- 1973: Image Gallery, Stockbridge, Massachusetts; Roko Gallery, New York City
- 1974: Queens College Art Library Gallery, Queens, New York; Art Gallery, University of Maine at Machias
- 1976, 1977: Munson-Williams-Proctor Arts Institute Gallery, Utica, New York; University Art Gallery, SUNY Binghamton
- 1979: "Southern Tip Series," South Street Seaport Museum, New York City
- 1982: Landmark Gallery, New York City
- 1984: University of Oregon Museum of Art, Eugene, Oregon
- 1987: Kingsborough Community College Art Gallery, New York
- 1988: Meridian Community College, Casteel Gallery, Mississippi
- 1996: Horne-Marshall Gallery, Meridian, Mississippi
- 1997: White Box Gallery, Fred Mitchell Recent Works; Philadelphia, Pennsylvania
- 1998: Fred Mitchell, Gallery X, New York
- 2003: David Findlay Jr. Gallery, 'Fred Mitchell', New York
- 2005: Noel Fine Art, 'Fred Mitchell: New York Harbor Scenes', Bronxville, New York
- 2007: Joyce Goldstein Gallery, 'Modernism Into Abstraction: Fred Mitchell 1940-1949', Chatham, New York

== Selected group exhibitions ==
- 1945: "Soldier Art" National Army Arts Contest, National Gallery of Art Washington, D.C.
- 1946–1949: Detroit Institute of Art, Detroit, MI
- 1953, 1954: "New York Painting and Sculpture Annual," Stable Gallery, New York City
- 1954–1955: "Young American Painters," circ., Solomon R. Guggenheim Museum, New York City
- 1955: "Vanguard Artists," Walker Arts Center, Minneapolis, MN
- 1956, 1960: "The Founding Five," Tanager Gallery, New York City
- 1958: "Young American Painters," Rome-New York Foundation, Rome, Italy
- 1961: Carnegie International, Pittsburgh, PA
- 1962: "Museum of Modern Art in Embassies," Manila, Philippines
- 1967: "Art in American Embassies Abroad," U.S. State Department
- 1968: "Will Insley, Fred Mitchell and Steve Poleskie," A D White Museum, Cornell University, Ithaca, New York
- 1974: "Nine Artists, Coenties Slip," Whitney Museum of American Art, Downtown, NY
- 1975: "Paintings and Watercolors," Hunterdon Art Center, Clinton, NJ
- 1972, 1973, 1975, 1976, 1983: Buecker & Harpsichords Gallery, NY
- 1980–1982: "New York Painting," Landmark Gallery, New York City
- 1985: "The Gathering of the Avant-Garde: The Lower East Side, 1948–1970," Kenkaleba House Gallery, New York City
- 1990: ULAE Gallery," Waterworks", New York, NY
- 1998: Gallery X, "Revelations", Harlem, NY
- 1999: Katherina Rich Perlow Gallery, "The Abstract Tradition: Fred Mitchell, John Ferren, Stephen Pace, John Grillo", New York, NY
- 2004: The Rockford Art Museum, "Reuniting An Era: Abstract Expressionists of The 1950s", Rockford, IL
- 2007: Hackett Freedman Gallery, "A Culture in the Making: New York and San Francisco in the 1950s", San Francisco, CA
- 2008: Robert Miller Gallery, "Beyond The Canon: Small Works in American Abstraction 1945–1965", New York, NY

== See also ==
- Art movement
- Abstract expressionism
- Action painting
- New York School
