= Frank Stout =

Frank Stout may refer to:

- Frank Stout (rugby union)
- Frank Stout (artist)
