= Marcia Marcus =

American painter (1928–2025)

- Born: January 11, 1928; New York City, U.S.
- Died: March 27, 2025 (aged 97)
- Education: New York University; Cooper Union; Art Students League
- Occupation: Artist
- Known for: Painting, printmaking
- Website: marciamarcus.com

Marcia Marcus (January 11, 1928 – March 27, 2025) was an American figurative painter of portraits, self-portraits, still lifes, and landscape.

== Background ==
Marcus was born on January 11, 1928, in New York City. She earned her B.F.A. at New York University in 1949, followed by studies at Cooper Union in 1950–1952, and with Edwin Dickinson at the Art Students League in 1954. Her classmates in school at Cooper Union included Alex Katz and Lois Dodd. During this time she also worked alongside her friend painter Anthony Toney. In the 1950s, she was working in the intersection of performance art (through happenings) and portraiture.

On March 27, 2025, Marcus died at the age of 97.

== Work ==
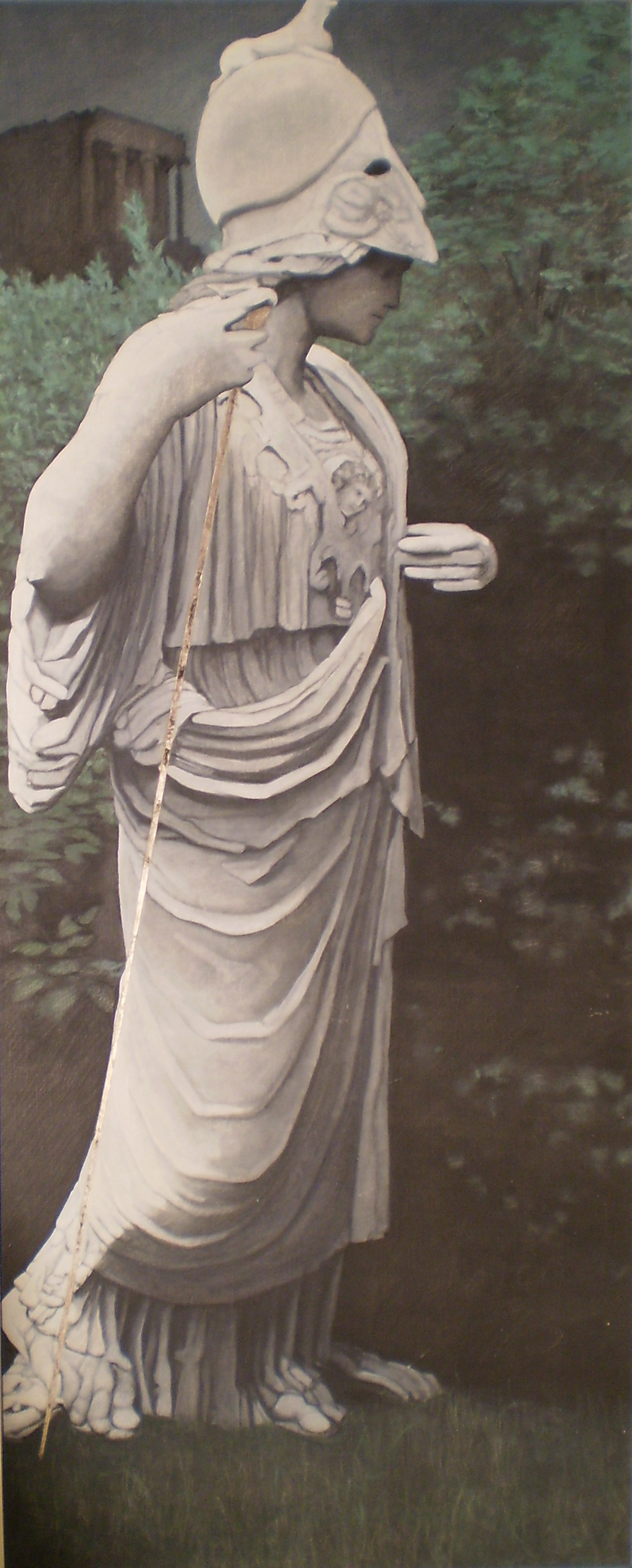
Marcia Marcus dressed as Athena

Marcus's "Happening," entitled In the Garden: A Ballet, was performed by Red Grooms and Bob Thompson at the Delancey Street Museum in 1960. In 1963 and 1965 Marcus's work was included in the annual exhibitions at the Whitney Museum of American Art. In 1962 until 1963, she was the recipient of a Fulbright Fellowship to France.

She taught at many institutions, including Purdue University, Moore College of Art and Design, Rhode Island School of Design, Cooper Union, Louisiana State University, New York University, Vassar College, Cornell University, The University of Iowa, and Northern Arizona University.

Although known for self-portraits, Marcus painted portraits of many people associated with the arts including collectors, critics and fellow artists. Among those Marcus depicted in her paintings were Jill Johnston, Red Grooms, Lucas Samaras, Willem de Kooning, Sari Dienes, Henry Geldzahler, Myron Stout, Bob Thompson, and Roy Neuberger. Many of her works visually address issues like female desire, race, and motherhood.

Her work is held in various public museum collections including the Whitney Museum of American Art, Smithsonian American Art Museum, Hirshhorn Museum and Sculpture Garden, Minneapolis Institute of Art, Albright-Knox Art Gallery, Philadelphia Museum of Art, National Museum of Women in the Arts, Williams College Museum of Art, the University of Colorado at Boulder Museum, and the Maier Museum of Art at Randolph College.

== Awards ==
- 1961 – Walter Gutman Fund
- 1962–1963 – Fulbright Fellowship to France
- 1964, 1977, 1982 – Ingram-Merrill Award
- 1964 – Rosenthal Award
- 1964, 1971 – Childe Hassam Fund Purchase
- 1966 – Ford Foundation, Artist in Residence Grant to the Rhode Island School of Design Museum
- 1991–1992 – National Endowment for the Arts, Painting
- 1993 – Pollock-Krasner
