= Israel Levitan =

American sculptor

- Born: June 13, 1912; Lawrence, Massachusetts, US
- Died: May 17, 1982 (aged 69); Largo, Florida
- Education: Chicago Art Institute
- Known for: sculpture, painting
- Movement: Abstract Expressionism

Israel Levitan (June 13, 1912 – May 17, 1982) was an American abstract expressionist sculptor, born in Lawrence, Massachusetts. Known as a sculptor, he also produced paintings, graphics and fine art works on paper.

The art critics of ARTnews selected his 1959 exhibition at the Barone Gallery in New York City, as one of the 10 best one-man exhibitions of the year. After World War II Levitan was involved in the New York art community, and participated in numerous exhibitions.

== Biography ==
Levitan left home at an early age to travel around the United States, Canada and Mexico. During his travels he lived for a time with Montana's Blackfoot Native Americans. In 1934 Levitan settled in Detroit, Michigan where he took a job as an auto worker. While living in Detroit, Levitan became interested in boxing and with union sponsorship, became Michigan State Amateur Welterweight Boxing Champion under the pseudonym Jack Myers.

In 1939 after a successful career in boxing, Levitan began to study art at the Chicago Art Institute, but his studies were interrupted by World War II. He joined the service as a medical corpsman in the South Pacific and became interested in physical therapy. After the war, Levitan moved to New York. He first studied with Amédée Ozenfant. Over the next three years, he studied with abstract expressionist painter Hans Hofmann where he met his wife, Idee, a painter and designer.

Hofmann, recognizing the three-dimensional aspects of Levitan's paintings, suggested that Levitan experiment with sculpture. Hoffman set out to find an appropriate teacher for his protégée and shortly thereafter Levitan commenced sculpture studies at the atelier of the French master Ossip Zadkine in Paris from 1950 to 1951.

After returning to New York, Levitan set up a studio on East 9th Street and was quickly assimilated into the art scene, eventually becoming Vice President of the American Abstract Artists group. He exhibited his work in the Tenth Street galleries, along with such contemporaries as Gabriel Kohn, Raoul Hague, Sidney Geist, and Louise Nevelson. Unlike most of the artists who worked in wood during the fifties, Levitan had been a painter for many years (since 1938).

== Exhibitions ==
Levitan had one-man shows at the Artists' Gallery, the Wayhe Gallery, the Barone Gallery and the Grand Central Moderns all in New York City; at the University of California, Berkeley, the Gallery in Memphis, Tennessee and the Santa Barbara Museum of Art.

Levitan's work has been shown at numerous museums, including the Musee d’Art Moderne, the Museum of Modern Art, the Brooklyn Museum, the Riverside Museum, the Pennsylvania Academy of Fine Arts, the Tokyo National Museum of Modern Art, the San Francisco Museum of Fine Arts, the Detroit Art Institute, Galerie Claude Bernard, the Guild Hall Museum, the Phillips Andover Academy, the Philadelphia Museum of Art, the Ohio State University, the Trica Kalis Gallery, the Tanager Gallery, the Stable Gallery and many others in New York City.

Levitan's bird flight-themed sculpture "Enrapture" appeared at the Whitney Museum of American Art's 'sculpture annual' in 1952. Additionally, upon New York City's Barone Gallery reopening at a new Madison Avenue location in 1957 it had an exhibition of Giuseppe Guerreschi paintings and Levitan's sculptures. The New York Times reviewed the exhibition and praised Levitan's works, stating that "one of the best pieces in the show is a dancer's torso in a warm-colored wood in which the artist has captured well the thrust of a dancer's body."

== Collections ==
Levitan works are in the permanent collections of museums, including the Guild Hall Museum and the Santa Barbara Museum of Art; and in private collections throughout the United States, Europe and Asia. In addition to these collections he designed a large 45 foot abstract sculptured ceiling for the Chapel of the Interchurch Center in New York City. The carved plaster ceiling features 1,000 lucite disks through which light is projected thus providing a night canopy appearance. Levitan illustrated at least one book named, On Waking Up: Notes From One Searcher to Another
