= Vincent D. Smith =

American artist from New York City

- Born: Vincent DaCosta Smith; December 12, 1929; Brooklyn, New York, U.S.
- Died: December 27, 2003 (aged 74); Manhattan, New York, U.S.
- Education: Skowhegan School of Painting and Sculpture, Maine,

Vincent DaCosta Smith (December 12, 1929 – December 27, 2003) was an American artist, painter, printmaker and teacher. He was known for his depictions of black life.

== Early life ==
Vincent DaCosta Smith was born on December 12, 1929, in the Bedford-Stuyvesant neighborhood of Brooklyn, to Beresford Leopole Smith and Louise Etheline Todd. Both were immigrants from Barbados. He was raised in Brownsville, Brooklyn and Smith drew what he saw around him. He attended an integrated school where he studied piano and the alto sax.

worked a range of jobs before he became a full-time artist. At 16, he worked for the Lackawanna Railroad repairing tracks. At 17, Smith enlisted in the army and traveled with his brigade for a year. It wasn't until after his time in the army that Smith began to paint and printmaking. At the age of 22, Smith was working in a post office where he grew to be friends with fellow artist Tom Boutis.

== Art education ==
Tom Boutis took Smith to a Paul Cézanne show at the Museum of Modern Art in 1951. After seeing the Cézanne show, Smith resigned from his position at the post office and began reading extensively about art.

He studied at the Art Students League of New York with Reginald Marsh.

Later, he began to sit in on classes at the Brooklyn Museum Art School, where the instructors would let him join in on the lessons and the criticisms. After attending classes at the Brooklyn Museum Art School and the Art Students League of New York, he was accepted and received a scholarship to the Skowhegan School of Painting and Sculpture in Maine, where he studied from 1953 to 1956.

Beginning in 1954, he started taking official classes at the Brooklyn Museum Art School, and studied painting, etching, and woodblock printmaking.

== Career ==
Smith was a figurative painter who used abstractions and materiality to make something new. Smith's work depicts the rhythms and intricacies of black life through his prints and paintings. Many of his paintings and prints rely heavily on patterns. According to Ronald Smothers, Vincent D. Smith's work "stood as an expressionistic bridge between the stark figures of Jacob Lawrence and the Cubist and Abstract strains represented by black artists like Romare Bearden and Norman Lewis." Smith has described his own work as "a marriage between Africa and the West." Over his life, he worked in both painting and printmaking.

In 1959, Smith won the John Hay Whitney Fellowship which allowed him to travel to the Caribbean for a year. During this year he was deeply inspired by the customs and lifestyle of the native people. Throughout his life, Smith attended various art schools but it was not until turning 50 he returned to college to earn an official degree.

From 1967 until 1976 he taught at the Whitney Museum’s Art Resource Center. Later in 1985, he taught printmaking at the Center for Art and Culture of Bedford Stuyvesant.

== Death and legacy ==
Smith died in Manhattan on the December 27, 2003 from lymphoma and related complications. Smith was aged 74.

His work is included in many public museum collections including Art Institute of Chicago, Newark Museum of Art, Museum of Modern Art (MoMA), Metropolitan Museum of Art, Yale University Art Gallery, Davidson Art Center, Fitzwilliam Museum, Brooklyn Museum, Albright-Knox Art Gallery, Rhode Island School of Design Museum, among others.

== Exhibitions ==
Over the course of his career, he had over 25 one-man shows and had his work shown in over 30 group shows.

Vincent D. Smith had shown in a range of galleries and museums over his life-span. In 1970, he had his first individual exhibition at the Fisk University in Nashville, Tennessee. His first retrospective was in 1989 at the Schenectady Museum in Schenectady, New York.

Solo shows:

- 1974 - The Portland Museum of Art, Portland, Maine
- 1974 - Studio Museum in Harlem, New York, New York
- 1989 - Schenectady Museum (Retrospective 1964-1989), Schenectady, New York

== Awards and honors ==
- 1959 – John Hay Whitney Fellowship, John Hay Whitney Foundation, New York City, New York
- 1967 – Artist in Residence, Smithsonian Conference Center
- 1968 – Grant, The American Academy and National Institute of Arts and Letters, New York
- 1971 – Creative Public Service Award for the Cultural Council Foundation, New York
- 1973 – National Endowment of the Arts and Humanities Travel Grant, New York
- 1973-1974 – Childe Hassam Purchase Award, American Academy of Arts and Letters, New York City, New York
- 1974 – Thomas P. Clarke Prize, National Academy of Design, New York
- 1981 – Windsor and Newton Award, National Society of Painters in Casein and Acrylic, New York.
- 1985-1986 – Artist-in-Residence, Kenkeleba House Gallery, New York.

== Works ==
Below are some selected works:

- Study for Mural at Boys and Girls High School, 1972, Metropolitan Museum of Art, New York, New York
- A Moment Supreme, 1972, Metropolitan Museum of Art, New York, New York
- The Triumph of B.L.S., 1973, Metropolitan Museum of Art, New York, New York
- Jonkonnu Festival, 1996, Metropolitan Museum of Art, New York, New York

=== Murals ===
- Mural for Crotona/Tremont Social Service Center, The Human Resource Administration, New York, New York 1980
- Mural for Oberia D. Dempsey Multi-Service Center of Central Harlem, New York, New York 1989

== Publications ==
=== Print portfolios ===
- Impressions: Our World, Volume I (a portfolio of seven etchings - five with aquatint, two with embossing). Emma Amos, Benny Andrews, Vivian Browne, Eldzier Cortor, Norman Lewis, Vincent D. Smith, John Wilson (all were collaborating artists) (35 ed.). New York City, New York: Printmaking Workshop. 1974.
- Smith, Vincent D. (1994). Eight Etchings, 1965–1966 (40 ed.). G.W. Einstein Co., Inc.

=== Book illustrations ===
- Amiri Baraka (LE Roi Jones) and Aminia Baraka The Music: Reflections on Jazz and Blues. William Morrow Company, New York, 1987
- Amiri Baraka; The Kaleidoscopic Torch, James B. Gwynne, ed., Stepping Stones Press, 1985
- Marguerite P. Dolch, Stories from Africa, Garrard Publishing Company, Campaign, Illinois, 1975
