= Robert Beauchamp =

American artist (1923–1995)

- Born: Robert John Beauchamp; 1923; Denver, Colorado, U.S.
- Died: 22 March 1995 (aged 71–72)
- Education: Colorado Springs Fine Arts Center; Cranbrook Academy of Art
- Known for: Painting; Arts education
- Awards: Guggenheim Fellow; Fulbright Scholarship
- Patrons: Walter Chrysler; Leo Castelli

Robert Beauchamp (1923 – 22 March 1995) was an American figurative painter and arts educator. Beauchamp's paintings and drawings are known for depicting dramatic creatures and figures with expressionistic colors. His work was described in the New York Times as being "both frightening and amusing". He was a Guggenheim Fellow and a student of Hans Hofmann.

== Early life and education ==
Robert Beauchamp was born in Denver, Colorado in 1923. He had three brothers and three sisters; the children were orphaned by the time Beauchamp was three. The family grew up impoverished due to the Great Depression, living in a community house with other families. As a child he dabbled in art but it wasn't until high school that he began taking art classes. When not creating art he also played sports; football and basketball, and enjoyed chemistry and geology.

He was told he was good at drawing, and replaced study hall classes with art classes, receiving instruction and inspiration from a Welsh teacher named R. Idris Thomas. While in high school Beauchamp would go, every Monday, to the public library and a local museum where he would read books about art; specifically French painting, as assigned by Thomas. Beauchamp would spend upwards of four hours a day in the art room and eventually won the Carter Memorial Prize, which provided a scholarship to the Colorado Springs Fine Arts Center. At Colorado Springs he studied under Boardman Robinson, painting landscapes in nature.

Beauchamp eventually joined the Navy and then returned to Colorado Springs to continue his studies. Traveling the world as an Armed Guard, he spent a year and a half at sea and the rest of the three years in San Francisco. Seeking to make money, and to follow his love for a girl, Beauchamp decided to attend Cranbrook Academy of Art from 1947–1948. There he studied pottery, believing one could "make more money selling pots than you could selling paintings." He described his experience at Cranbrook as intimidating and claustrophobic, and eventually switched to sculpture before switching to painting.

== Career and personal life ==
Robert Beauchamp, Fantasy, 1987. Exhibited at the Gruenebaum Gallery, NYC in 1988

Beauchamp moved to New York City in the early 1950s and was involved in the Tenth Street galleries, which provided outlets for more experimental artists and the second generation of abstract expressionists. Despite his involvement with 10th Street and friendships with abstract artists, abstract art never interested in him. He showed at numerous galleries in New York and Provincetown, socializing with gallery owners, artists and collectors. His first exhibition was at the Tanager Gallery in New York, he also showed during the 1950s at the Hansa Gallery. In New York and Provincetown he studied under Hans Hofmann. Eventually he felt that abstract expressionism became dull and stalemated.

During the 1960s he showed at the Green Gallery. C. 1960 he was awarded a Fulbright Award allowing him to travel to La Romola, Italy. He traveled frequently to cities such as Rome and worked constantly. Beauchamp returned to the states and lived in Provincetown at Walter Gutman's house, who awarded Beauchamp a grant. That year he met his future wife, Nadine Valenti, whom he married in 1967. Beauchamp taught at a variety of schools during his lifetime including Brooklyn College, School of Visual Arts, Cooper Union and the Art Students League of New York during the last fifteen years of his life. Beauchamp died in March, 1995, of prostate cancer in New York.

== Paintings and drawings ==
Beauchamp described his drawings as painterly, seeking the spontaneity in an image. He would develop a drawing then a painting, and vice versa. His heavily impastoed paintings, often described as sculptures themselves, came from the pouring of paint from a can, with little planning and constant evolution in the medium upon the canvas. He preferred little planning to his creations, believing that an artists work would become stale and repetitive with constant planning.

He also created large scale works, at times 70 inches long. Beauchamp had little intention of ever selling his large works, preferring to create them due to the slow and intense experience he received from the process. The large drawings he created on the floor, and the smaller works were created on a table. Paintings were created on either the floor or wall and he described his painting process as "splattering", "pushing the paint around," and sponging.

Animals often appear in his paintings, despite a dislike for domestic animals outside of his artistic creations. He called the characters in his paintings as Beauchamps. Some Beauchamps hold meaning, with Beauchamp rarely sharing the meaning behind the symbols and characters. He made up the creatures himself, seeking to emphasize the character of each.

=== Reception ===
In 2006 the University of Massachusetts Amherst College of Visual & Performing Arts hosted an exhibition of Beauchamp's pieces from the 1960s, curators stated that Beauchamp's work: "effortlessly blends innovative style elements with narrative, descriptive images. One senses equal enjoyment in the manipulation of, and interaction with, color and paint, and the often sudden and unexpected presence of a wasp or a lump of sugar."

== Notable exhibitions ==
- Felix Landau Gallery
- Guggenheim Museum
- Louisiana State University
- University of South Florida
- Utah Museum of Fine Arts
- Walker Art Center
- Whitney Museum of American Art

== Notable collections ==
- Denver Art Museum
- Hirshhorn Museum
- Museum of Modern Art
- University of Massachusetts Amherst
- University of Texas
