= Pierre Jacquemon =

Pierre Jacquemon (1936 – 2001) was a French-American contemporary artist, and a key 20th-century representative of the Lyon school of painting.

Jacquemon was a native of Lyon, born on 6 August 1936. At 16 he began to study medicine and contracted severe polio disease. He remained heavily disabled for the rest of his life. Despite this he developed into one of the Lyon city's foremost artists and one of the few with an international career.

Non-figurative painter since 1955, in France he participated in milestone exhibitions such as Antagonisms, Congress for the Freedom of Culture (Antagonismes, Congrès pour la Liberté de la Culture) at the Palais du Louvre - Musée des Arts Décoratifs in Paris (1960). He lived in London (where he may have lived as a tramp) from 1959 to 1961 and became a New York resident in 1963.

In New York, he settled on the Lower East Side of Manhattan and had his first solo exhibition at the then well-known Paul Bianchini Gallery in 1963.

He exhibited at other New York City galleries throughout the 1960s and 1970s, including Phoenix Gallery, one of the 10th Street galleries in Manhattan.

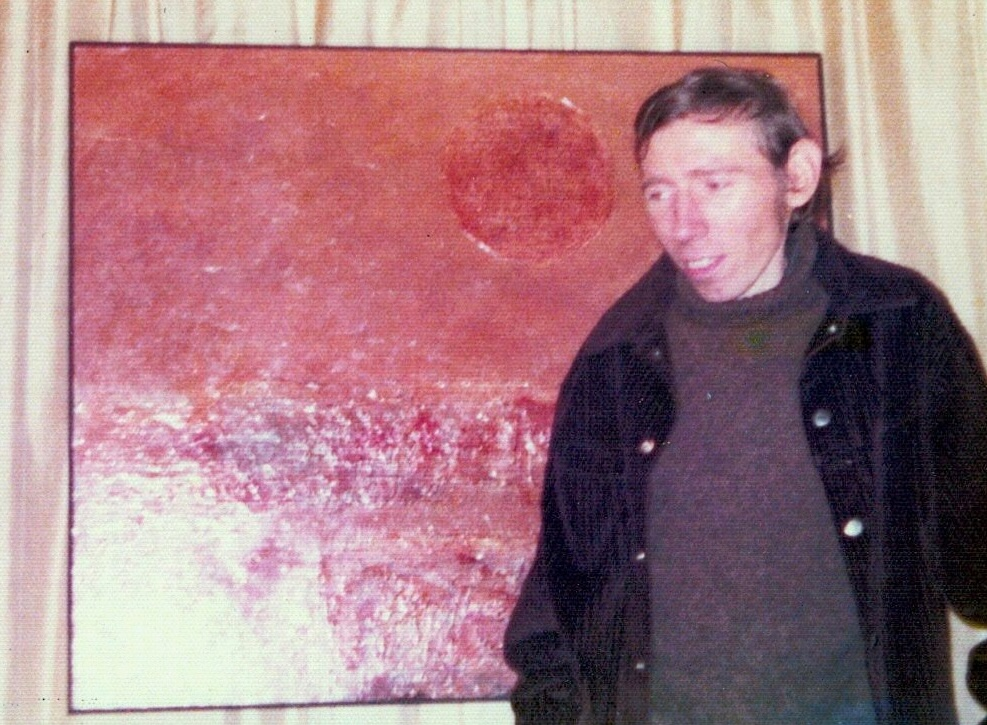
Pierre Jacquemon at the opening of an exhibit of his work.

His works are displayed in several public collections throughout the world, including in the US, the UK (as per the official data base for UK public collections), Japan and France (including at Musée d'Art Moderne de la Ville de Paris and Musée des Beaux Arts de Lyon).

His largely abstract (although kind of primitive symbols are often used) and atmospheric works have a mysterious feel: "Absent any movement, any defined form, Jacquemon's paintings are essentially meditative".

His work can be affiliated to the Lyrical Abstraction group but also to the Art Brut movement. He always followed a very personal, poetic and humble path certainly influenced by the Beat Generation and American New Age atmosphere, as described in Irving Stettner's Stroker: "After all it only takes a moment or two to look at a painting by Pierre Jacquemon: yet in a split-second, or wink of an eye we jump our skins, end up transfixed: immediately we are plunged into a world of timeless space, able to witness planets colliding, the hot red ball at the center of the earth, the flery tails of shooting comets, resplendent meteor showers".
