= Angelo Ippolito =

American painter

- Born: 7 November 1922; Sant'Arsenio, Italy
- Died: 29 October 2001 (aged 78); Johnson City, New York, U.S.
- Known for: Painting
- Movement: Abstract Expressionism
- Awards: Tiffany, Lannan, American Foundation
- Website: angeloippolito.com

Angelo Ippolito (7 November 1922 – 29 October 2001) was an American painter best known for color field oils on canvas that have been exhibited and collected internationally, as well as for his central role in inaugurating the downtown art scene of postwar New York.

== Biography ==
Ippolito's family immigrated to the United States when he was 9 years old. After serving in the Philippines during World War II, he studied with Amédée Ozenfant and John Ferren in New York and Afro in Rome. In 1952 he and painter Fred Mitchell invited artists Lois Dodd, William King, and Charles Cajori to join in founding the first artist-run downtown gallery in New York. The Tanager Gallery inaugurated the Tenth Street-avant-garde scene of the 1950s, and its members soon grew to include artists such as Sally Hazelet, Alex Katz and Philip Pearlstein. Its primary audience was other artists who were "simultaneously participants and spectators." The Tanager's founders actively sought out underrecognized artists, giving a first show to artists who would later become famous, including Elise Asher, Alfred Jensen, and Jasper Johns. Ippolito later accepted positions as artist-in-residence at the University of California at Berkeley (1961–62) and as a professor of art at Michigan State University (1963–71) and Binghamton University (1971–2001). After his death on October 29, 2001, he was interred at Green-Wood Cemetery in Brooklyn, New York.

== Work ==
Critic Robert Rosenblum called Ippolito's inaugural exhibition at the Bertha Schaefer Gallery "a notable event," writing that "his canvases present abstract analogies to a landscape vision, suggesting earth, horizon line and sky; yet the separate realms of land and air are most often fused together in a single coloristic unity." Reviewing his later work, artist-critic Fairfield Porter described him as one of the few abstract artists "who uses brilliant color as his material instead of something to dress the painting up with."

Ippolito's canvases from the later 1960s explored the abstract possibilities of the midwestern U.S. landscape. His former teacher John Ferren remarked that he "could spend a summer in the landscape of Ippolito." In the 1970s his paintings became more expansive and bright-hued, prompting critic Hilton Kramer to write, "the pleasure of color remains his primary concern, and he is a virtuoso in the handling of it. Some of his finest effects, in these new paintings, are achieved when he is juggling bold areas of hot color with an almost reckless abandon." In the following two decades, Ippolito's paintings diverged further from their roots in the landscape to explore atmospheric visions. As he told art historian Kenneth Lindsay in 1974, "When I find the color of the painting I find the form."

Ippolito's work has been exhibited in international venues such as the Carnegie International and São Paulo Biennale and collected by museums such as the Museum of Modern Art, the Whitney Museum of American Art, the Metropolitan Museum of Art, the Yale University Art Gallery, The Phillips Collection, and the Hirshhorn Museum and Sculpture Garden.
