= Raymond P. Spillenger =

American painter

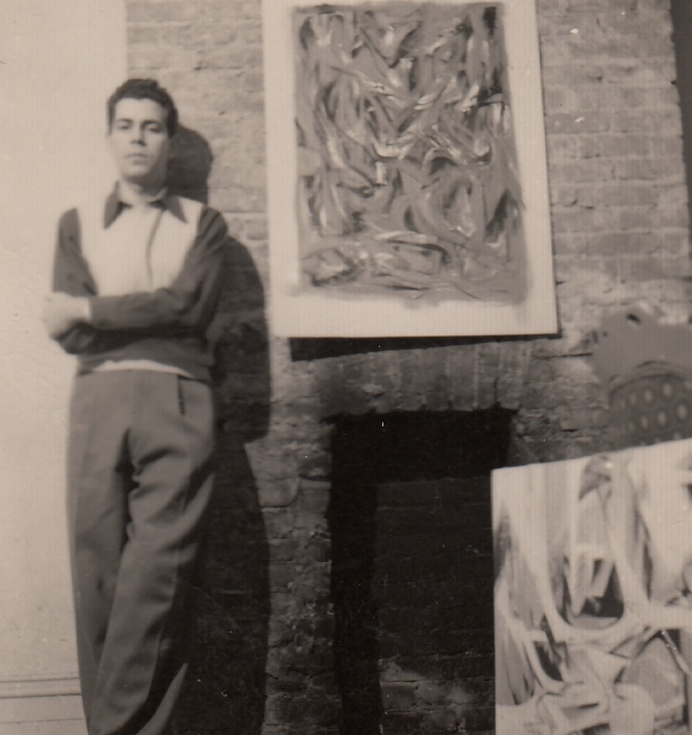
- Raymond Spillenger in his New York studio, ca. 1951.
- Born: October 24, 1924; Brooklyn, New York
- Died: November 20, 2013 (aged 89); New York, New York
- Known for: Painting
- Movement: Abstract Expressionism
- Spouse: Marian Dennison (née Katz) (m. 1955; died in 1997)

Raymond P. Spillenger (October 24, 1924 – November 20, 2013) was an American painter associated with the New York School.

== Biography ==
Spillenger was born on October 24, 1924, in Brooklyn, to Herbert Spillenger, a postal worker, and Minnie Pines. He showed artistic ability from an early age and won several art prizes in elementary and high school. In 1942 he enlisted in the Army Air Corps and flew a C-47 transport plane over “The Hump” (the Eastern Himalayas) in Burma, China and India, an extremely dangerous assignment, for which he was awarded the Distinguished Flying Cross and other honors.

Spillenger returned to the U.S. in 1945 and attended Pratt Institute on the G.I. Bill. After graduating in 1948, Spillenger enrolled at Black Mountain College in Asheville, North Carolina, where he studied with Willem de Kooning and Josef Albers and met John Cage, Merce Cunningham, Buckminster Fuller, Kenneth Noland and a number of painters with whom he'd remain close, Pat Passlof and Elaine de Kooning among them. After Black Mountain, he studied in Rome with Giorgio Morandi and Pericle Fazzini, returning in 1950 to New York.

By 1950 Spillenger had left behind his early figurative work and was focusing exclusively on abstraction. His media of choice were oil on canvas, board and paper. He occasionally exhibited during the fifties, and showed works at three New York Painting and Sculpture Annuals at the Stable Galleries, from 1953 to 1955. His work was admired by his peers; Pat Passlof called him “the most brilliant unknown painter of his generation.” He was one of the first regular members of The club, the modern artists’ semi-official discussion venue, and the Cedar Tavern, the unofficial one. In 1955, he married Marian Dennison (née Katz) and with the birth of their first son Paul in 1956, they moved to an apartment at 95 East Tenth Street in the middle of a hub of the New York art scene. Their second son Clyde was born there in 1960. De Kooning's studio was across the street, at 88 East Tenth Street, Esteban Vicente was in the same building, right across the hall, and his friend Franz Kline lived around the corner on Ninth Street.

Tenth Street between Third and Fourth Avenue was then home to a number of artist cooperative galleries (the Tenth Street galleries) such as the Tanager, the Camino, the March and the Brata, which were created to offer alternatives to the uptown galleries that the artists felt were too conservative. Spillenger was a founding member of the March Gallery in 1957. During the 1950s and 1960s, Spillenger produced a large number of abstract paintings. The influence of Arshile Gorky, de Kooning, and Kline on these works is unmistakable, but they retain their own identity and integrity.

By the mid-1970s, the New York art scene as Spillenger knew it had dispersed. Some painters (Mark Rothko, Jackson Pollock, Kline) had died, others (de Kooning) had become wealthy and moved out of New York; many more either gave up painting or moved to more congenial places to raise their children. At the same time, Spillenger felt the galleries and the art scene in general had become more corrupt than ever before. He wanted no part of it, and soon he stopped painting entirely.

Fifteen years later, now in his late sixties, he came back to art with a vengeance. He began attending life drawing classes and churning out hundreds and hundreds of works on paper, mostly figurative, which still showed the command of movement, line and form that had characterized his abstract work. He continued painting, drawing and revising until 2011, when advanced dementia made it impossible for him to work. He died in 2013, one of the last abstract expressionists to pass.

== Work ==
Works by Raymond Spillenger can be found in the collections of the Walker Art Center in Minneapolis, Minn., and the Hirshhorn Museum in Washington, D.C. He was subject of an exhibition at the Black Mountain College Museum + Arts Center January 22 – May 21, 2016. The show traveled to the Neuberger Museum of Art September 11 - December 23, 2016.

Ray Spillinger: Rediscovery of a Black Mountain Painter is a catalogue raisonné of his work prepared by his son, Paul Spillenger and a publication of Black Mountain College Museum + Arts Center.
