= John Krushenick =

American painter (1927–1998)

John Krushenick (March 18, 1927 – June 19, 1998) painter and co-founder of the Brata Gallery in New York City. He studied with Hans Hofmann, exhibited at the Leo Castelli Gallery in New York City, and MoMA Tokyo. He and brother Nicholas Krushenick opened an artists' cooperative called the Brata Gallery in the late 1950s. During the late 1950s many cooperative galleries along Ninth and Tenth Street in New York City's East Village showcased the work of young artists. The painters and sculptors showcased there were among the avant-garde of the day. According to some sources, one of the earliest of the postwar New York "shaped canvas" paintings, by Edward Clark, was shown at the Brata in 1957.

== See also ==
- New York School
- Nicholas Krushenick
- Tenth street galleries
