= Frank Stout (artist) =

American painter

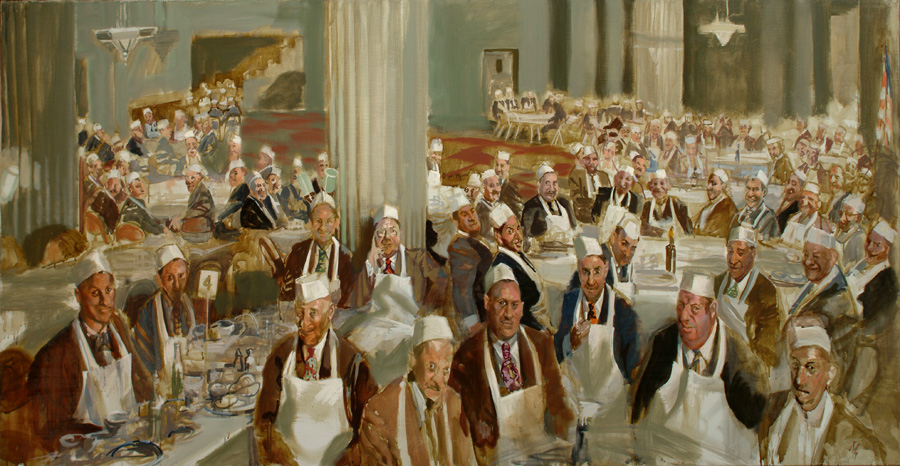
- The Lobster Convention, oil on canvas, 37 x 72 inches, 1974
- Born: Francis Joseph Stout; February 17, 1926 [Massachusetts]
- Died: April 13, 2012 (aged 86)
- Education: School of the Museum of Fine Arts, Boston
- Known for: painting sculpture
- Movement: East Coast Realism
- Awards: National Academy of Design (Henry F. Ranger Award), American Academy of Arts & Letters
- Website: frankstout.com

Frank Joseph Stout (February 17, 1926 – April 13, 2012) was an American figurative artist associated with post-abstract expressionist realism. He is best known for his psychologically penetrating, bravura portraits of individuals and large groups, raw, soulful American landscapes and painterly Italian landscapes and group portraits. He is also known for flowing, sensuous figure sculpture in a variety of media, and his deft pastel, ink and watercolour drawings.

He lived in Boston, New York City, Vermont (USA) and finally Tuscany (Italy).

== Life ==
Frank Stout was born in on the North Shore of Boston on February 17, 1926. After a stint in navy training, he won a place at the School of the Museum of Fine Arts, Boston, on the G.I. Bill (1949–1950).

Stout married Constance Lyle in 1951, and moved to New York. As well as full-time painting, he did drafting work for architect I.M. Pei & Associates, a talent later enabling him to design his own modernist home in rural Vermont. He travelled to Peru in 1954, invited to exhibit at the Society of Architects, and was awarded a commission from the American Embassy in Lima. On returning to Manhattan, Constance tragically died. Stout married Korean aristocrat and scholar Chaewoon Koh in 1960, and an only child was born (Mira Stout, the writer and filmmaker); both mother and daughter appear as portrait subjects throughout his career.

Stout's first US solo show came in 1960 at the Tanager Gallery in New York, showcasing many of the avant grade then gathered around the 10th Street galleries and the Cedar Tavern. Friends and neighbours included Robert Rauschenberg, Alex Katz, Wolf Kahn, Emily Mason, Marisol, Lois Dodd and Willem de Kooning. Stout's career developed on through a series of acclaimed solo exhibits at the Dorsky Gallery on Madison Avenue, continuing until dealer Sam Dorsky's death in 1966, when Stout accepted an appointment as Artist-in-Residence at Marlboro College in Vermont. After a hiatus from showing in New York, he returned to solo exhibitions with the Landmark Gallery in Soho in the late '70s to early '80s, with shows of inventive and bold figure sculpture in terracotta, wire, bronze, marble, and poured plaster. He then showed both painting and sculpture at a number of East Coast museums and galleries, including the Museum of Fine Arts (Springfield (MA)), MIT(Cambridge, MA), Princeton galleries, University of Maine, Kornbluth Gallery, Queens Museum, Fleming Museum UVM, Wichita Art Museum, KA, Sheldon Swope Art Gallery, (IN) United States Information Agency, (Washington DC). The Painting Center, (New York, NY), Mercer Price Gallery (VT), Roko Gallery (New York, NY), Lohin-Geduld Gallery, (New York, NY).

A fire in the late '70s destroyed much of Stout's work. He went on to produce a body of new paintings and sculpture, including his seminal Convention Pictures, Americana roadside landscapes, supermarket still lifes, and a wide variety of sculpture. He combined this productivity with his appointment to Chair of the Art Department at Marlboro.

In 1981 and '82 Stout spent a year in Tuscany teaching art; this had a lasting influence on his life and work. He and his wife Chaewoon purchased a property in the hills outside Siena, where they mostly lived until Chaewoon's death in 1997. Stout remained there, working intensively until 2006. He focused mainly on Italianate subjects, and completed his "Artists & Models Series," a cycle of artist portraits from Antonio Canova to Sigmund Freud. While abroad, out of the mainstream art scene, he continued to receive honors and public commissions, including a controversial plaza sculpture installation at the Vermont State House—initially bronze nudes, revised to wildlife after an indecency outcry—plus commissioned state portraits, appointments to the Vermont Council on the Arts, The Vermont Studio School, and The New England Foundation for the Arts.

Stout continued to paint, sculpt, and exhibit. He had retrospectives (2000, 2001, & 2008) in Vermont and New York, with shows at the Painting Center and Lohin-Geduld Gallery in New York City, the Drury Gallery in Marlboro, and the Brattleboro Museum and Art Center (BMAC) in Brattleboro, VT. His work is featured in several permanent public collections across the US and abroad. Reviews and essays on Stout have appeared in 'ArtNews",The New York Times, The New York Observer, Brattleboro Reformer, American Artist and Harpers magazine. Private and reclusive, Stout has granted few interviews.

Stout received awards from the National Academy of Design (Henry F. Ranger Award) and the American Academy of Arts and Letters.

== Early work ==
Stout's painting of the 1950s moved from total abstraction to gnomic semi-abstraction, influenced by Peruvian ceramics and folkloric imagery. In the 1960s, his work become representational, painting bold portraits, everyday objects, interiors, and planar landscapes using heavy impasto and drippy abstract expressionist brushstrokes. Stout's budding realism was chiefly influenced by expressionist Oskar Kokoschka.

== Sculpture ==
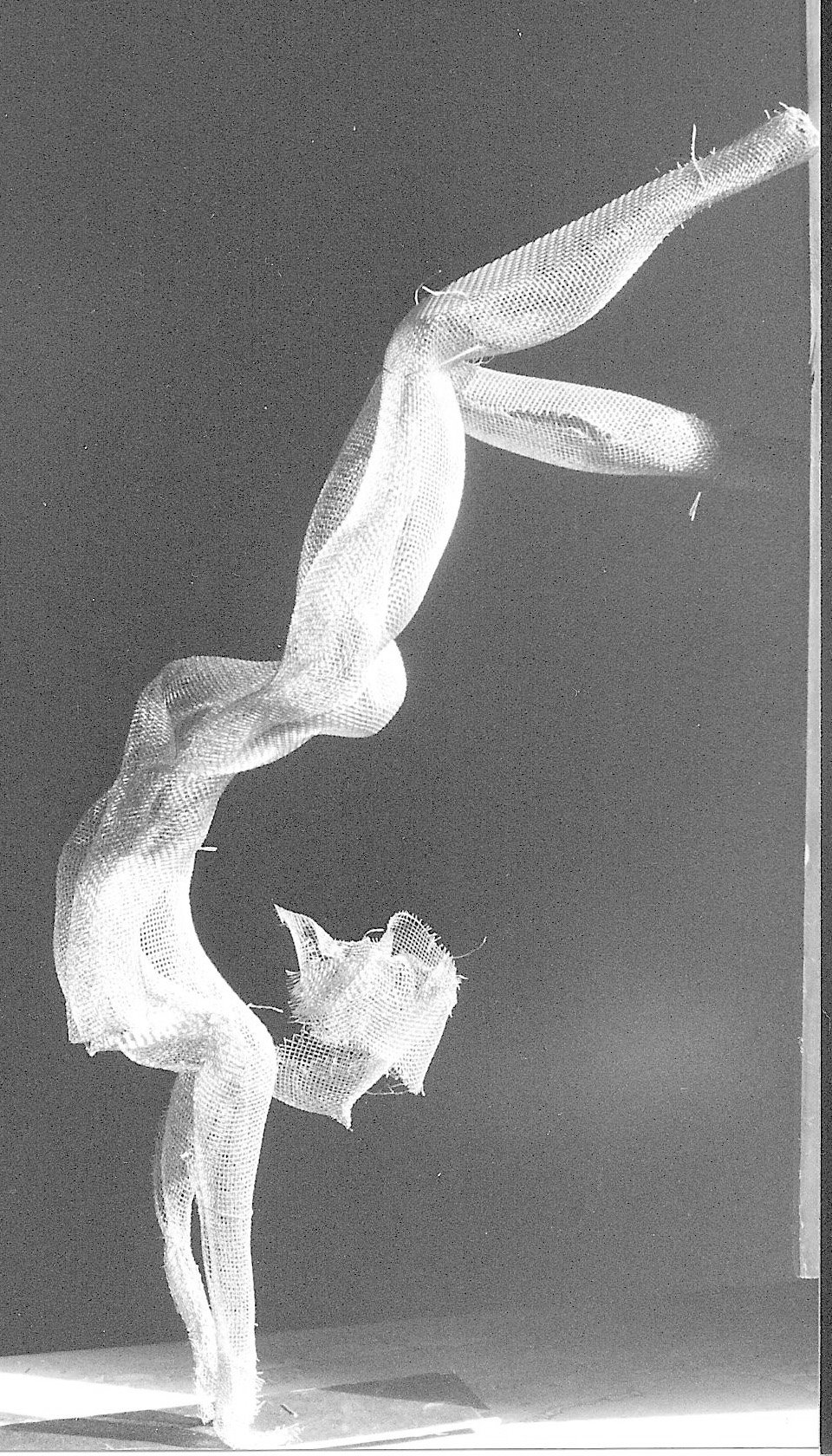
Handstand by Stout

From the early 70s, Stout applied himself to sculpture in tandem with painting, initially large abstract wood and marble pieces, showing unusual versatility across the two practices. He soon abandoned pure abstraction for figurative work with ceramic pieces bearing a Picassoid influence. Stout's terracotta works include a series of jazz artists and small-scale nude figures, sometimes in bathing suits and street clothes, executed with loose, gestural lines and sensuous contours.

He created a cycle of original wall-friezes and 3D plaque portraits in fired clay and plaster in the '80s and '90s, employing minimal but exacting detail, painted glaze accents, and carved linear marks. He also worked in alabaster, and produced medium-sized nude figures in poured plaster over wire mesh, later paring this down to the armature screen itself, achieving a luminous effect. Additionally, he used unconventional found materials, notably foam plumbing insulation, Styrofoam, sheet metal, plastic bottles, wooden ice-cream sticks, and steel wool. His style closely echoes that of his painting: playful and assured, with an economy of line and wry humor described as "throwaway virtuosity."

== Mature work ==
From the late '70s onward, Stout's painting style became more polished and ambitious in subject matter, with a satirical edge and cruelty sometimes compared with Jack Levine and Francis Bacon. His subdued palette, Old Master scumbling, and complex compositions pay homage to Titian, Rembrandt, Frans Hals, and Velasquez, but his painterly method is also harnessed to contemporary subjects via expressionism and his own bold improvisational technique, with tone-shifts from high art intention to exuberant caricature.

The primacy of figure painting in his work is manifest in his "Artists & Models Series" (late 1990s to 2008), a series of portraits of iconic artists and their subjects. His oeuvre is populated by single and group portraits of both the famous and the obscure, from Pope John Paul II to anonymous nursing graduates, family snaps, a Native American tribe, and his noted "Convention Pictures", a series of monumental group portraits of corporate and civic gatherings captured on a cinematic scale. Stout's work ruminates on themes of the individual and society, and the passing of time.

His images of intimacy and of anonymity in 20th- and 21st-century culture are rendered with a sensitive but dispassionate eye, covering a spectrum of moods from the melancholic to the ridiculous. Portraits of Doris Day and D.W. Griffiths' golden age of Hollywood are juxtaposed with winos, and landscapes of decaying New England cinemas, Masonic lodges, and abandoned farms, factories, trailers, and fast food outlets. Where photorealists and Pop realists assert a coolly ironic stance toward similar imagery, Stout expresses an interest in the psychological and emotional character of his subjects as well as their graphic and optical attributes. Where the former use flatness and color to achieve a sense of distance, Stout uses light and pigment to create illusionistic depth and engagement. A sense of restlessness and transience haunt Stout's depopulated landscapes, while the faces in his portraits convey a complicity and bafflement about their roles in the occasions captured. Stout's wide-ranging subject matter forms an additive portrait of contemporary society in transition; moments frozen within a broader, uncertain human narrative.

Stout's work frequently depicted human subjects in relation to their occupations, including butchers and waiters. He also painted everyday objects such as trailer-homes, treating them as subjects of artistic interest.

== Public collections ==
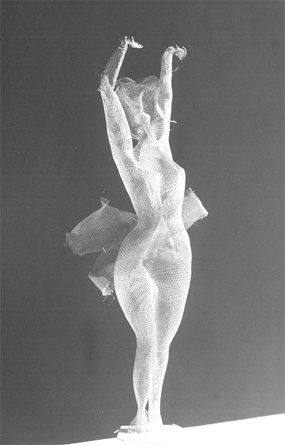
A sculpture by Stout

- American Embassy, Brazil (São Paulo)
- American Embassy, Peru (Lima)
- National Academy, New York, NY
- Wichita Art Museum, Wichita, KS
- Museum of Fine Arts, Springfield, MA
- Vermont State House, Montpelier, VT
- City Hall Fountain, Burlington, VT
- Vermont Arts Council, Montpelier, VT
- University of Vermont, Burlington, VT
- Brattleboro Memorial Hospital, Brattleboro, VT
- Sheldon Swope Art Gallery, Terre Haute, IN
- The US Information Agency Federal Building, Washington, DC
- The Wolf Kahn & Emily Mason Foundation
