= Tom Boutis =

American artist (1922–2018)

- Born: Thomas Boutis; 1922; New York City, New York, U.S.
- Died: October 29, 2018 (aged 95–96); U.S.
- Education: Cooper Union
- Movement: Abstract expressionist

Thomas Boutis (1922 – 2018) was an American artist, known as an abstract expressionist with a love of color. He primarily worked in painting, drawing, collage, watercolor, and printmaking.

== Biography ==
Tom Boutis was born in 1922 in New York City to parents from Kastoria, Greece. He worked as a Federal Art Project artist. Boutis was drafted by the United States Army in 1943. Boutis attended Cooper Union and graduated in 1948. He was a friend of Vincent DaCosta Smith and in the early 1950s Boutis influenced Smith's early career as an artist. His first solo art show was in January 1955 at Zabriskie Gallery in New York City.

In the 1950s, with artists from the E 10th Street co-op movement, he established the Area Gallery in New York City which was in operation from 1958 until 1965. The original members of Area Gallery were Tom Boutis, alongside artists John Ireland Collins, Charles Steven DuBack, Joe Fiore, Bernard Langlais, Ed Moses, Daphne Mumford, and Paul Yakovenko. Alongside many of the artist from Area Gallery, Boutis was a founding member of the artist-run Landmark Gallery at 469 Broome Street in SoHo, in operation from 1972 until 1982.

Boutis was a National Academician and member of the National Academy of Design, joining in 1995.

Boutis died on October 29, 2018, at the age of 96.

His work is included in many public museum collections, including Art Institute of Chicago, the Solomon R. Guggenheim Museum archives, the Smithsonian Archives of American Art, among others.
