= Sally Hazelet Drummond =

American painter (1924-2017)

- Born: Sally Potter Hazelet; June 4, 1924; Evanston, Illinois
- Died: April 9, 2017 (aged 92); Germantown, New York
- Movement: Minimalism

Sally Hazelet Drummond (1924–2017) was an American artist known for her minimalist paintings. She took inspiration from Georges Seurat's pointillism paintings, A Sunday on La Grande Jatte in particular.

Drummond née Hazelet was born on June 4, 1924, in Evanston, Illinois. She grew up with her mother, father, and older sister. She attended Columbia University, the Institute of Design at the Illinois Institute of Technology in Chicago, and the University of Louisville's Hite Art Institute. In the 1950s she exhibited at the Tanager Gallery on 10th Street in New York City. In 1967 she was the recipient of a Guggenheim Fellowship.

Drummond died on April 9, 2017 in Germantown, New York. Her work is in the Buffalo AKG Art Museum, the Hood Museum of Art, the Metropolitan Museum of Art, the Hirshhorn Museum and Sculpture Garden, the Museum of Modern Art, and the Whitney Museum of American Art.

In 2015 Gallery X at the Hite Art Institute held a retrospective of her work entitled Iconoclastic Fervor: Sally Hazelet Drummond's Road to Abstraction.
