= Francis Celentano =

American painter

Francis Michael Celentano (May 25, 1928 – November 20, 2016) was one of the seminal artists in the op art movement that started in the 1960s. He was one of the featured artists in an exhibition called The Responsive Eye, which was held at the Museum of Modern Art in New York City in 1965. He continued to contribute to the art form throughout his life, working in black and white, color, kinetic paintings and three dimensional studies.

== Artistic work ==
Among public collections are the Museum of Modern Art, the Whitney Museum of Contemporary Art, The Albright-Knox Gallery, the Museum of Contemporary Art in Buenos Aires and the Seattle Art Museum. He is represented by the Lee Russo Gallery, Oregon, David Richard Gallery, New Mexico, and D. Wigmore Fine Arts, New York.
