= Don Kunz =

American artist (1937–2001)

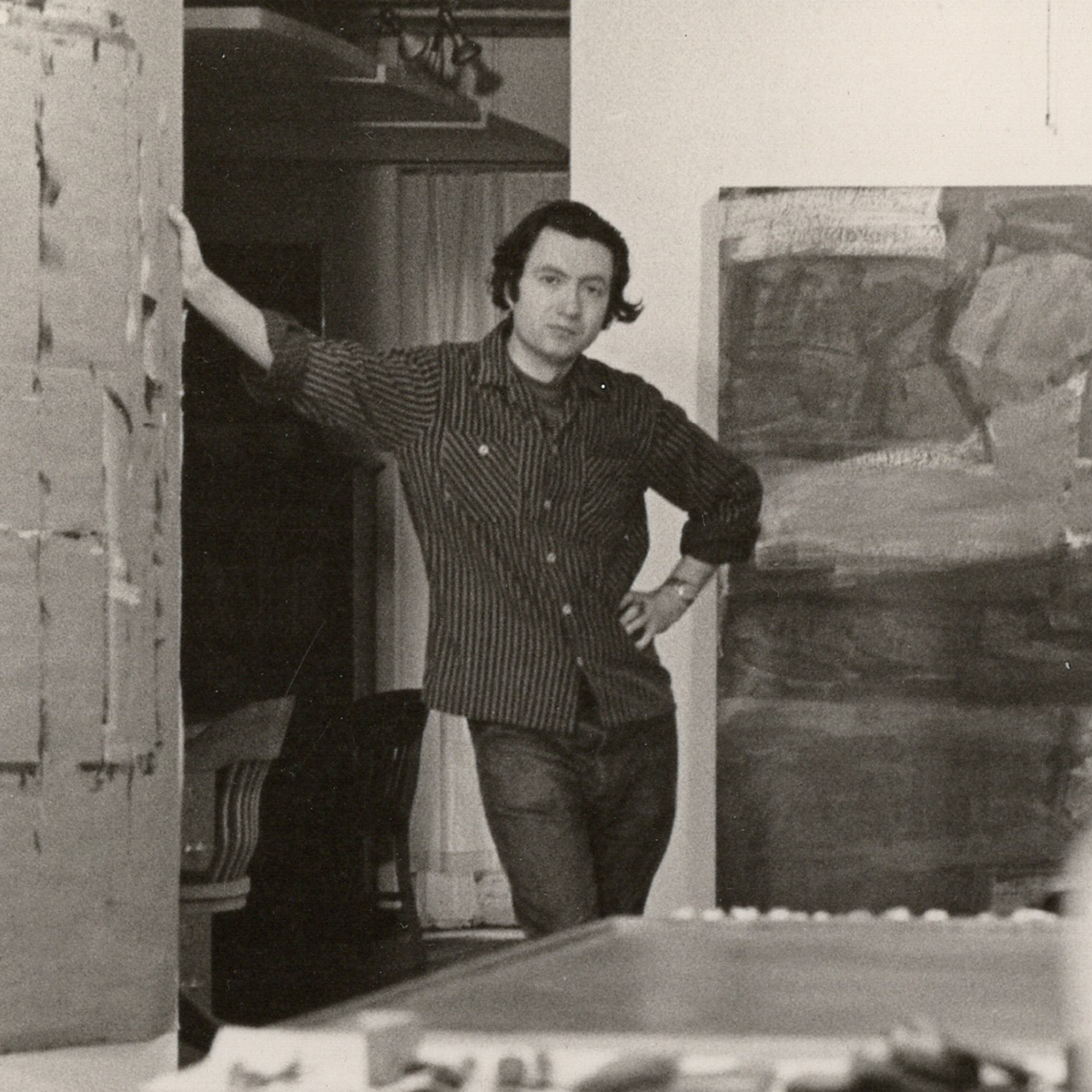
- Don Kunz in his painting studio in New York City, approximately 1972
- Born: 1937; Portland, Oregon
- Died: August 24, 2001 (aged 63–64); New York, New York
- Occupations: Artist, Professor of Painting, Professor of Calligraphy

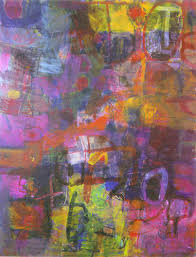
Painting by Kunz

Don Kunz (1932 – 2001), is known for his work as a calligrapher, painter, and teacher. Kunz served the Cooper Union for 33 years. He was devoted to the education of artists, most notably in the areas of painting and calligraphy; he is remembered for creating a dialogue between the two disciplines. His work was described as canvases filled with rich color and texture. Robert Rindler, former Dean of The School of Art at The Cooper Union for the Advancement of Science and Art describes Kunz's work as "a cacophony of color calligraphic gestures. It is the orchestra warming up in discord and evolving before your eyes into the most complex orchestral magic. They are eternally moving while frozen in time and place. All of Kunz's paintings require our participation in a dialogue."

== Biography ==
=== Early life and education ===
A native of Portland, Oregon, Kunz studied calligraphy at Reed College with Lloyd Reynolds (1902–1978), an art teacher at Grant High School in Portland. Kunz trained at the Art Institute of Chicago and Portland's Museum Art School.

=== Career ===
During the 1950s, Kunz's paintings were shown at the Portland and Seattle Art Museums and at galleries in Portland. Kunz taught calligraphy at Queens College, New York and at The Cooper Union beginning in 1966. He was later granted tenure at the latter in 1993 where he continued to teach painting and calligraphy until his death in 2001.

=== Death and legacy ===
Kunz was a prolific artist who painted medium and large scale works on canvas as well as smaller works on paper and canvas. In 2008 in New York City, the Wilmer Jennings Gallery presented the exhibition Inspired by Actual Events: Exhibition in Tribute to Don Kunz, which was organized by Joseph Woolridge, curated by Gregory Coates, and included artwork by Marina Gutierrez, Lisa Hamilton, Glenis Holder, Ryan Oakes, Trevor Oakes, and Jasmin Ortiz.

== Exhibits ==
- The Cooper Union School of Art: Painting Faculty Exhibition Group Show – Oct 31 - Dec 2 1995, New York, NY
- Tenth Street Days: The Co-ops of the 1950s - Camino artists at Amos Eno Gallery, 101 Wooster, Dec. 20, 1977 - Jan. 7, 1978, New York, NY
- MoMA PS1, 10 Downtown: 10 Years – Sep 11 - Oct 2, 1977, New York, NY
- Portland Art Museum One person show, 1959 – Portland, OR
- Seattle Art Museum – 1959, Seattle, WA
- Oregon Centennial – 1959, Portland, OR
- Friendship House – Three person show, 1957 – Portland, OR
- Lewis and Clark College One person show, 1955 – Portland, OR
- Oregon Society of Artists One person show, 1955 – Portland, OR
- Lipman Little Gallery One person show, 1955 – Portland, OR

== Public collections ==
- Onassis Cultural Center – New York, NY
- Portland Art Museum – Portland, OR
- Kaiser Permanent Collection – Reed College, Portland, OR
- The Phillips Collection – Washington, DC

== Bibliography ==
- Joellen Bard, Dore Ashton, Bruno Palmer-Poroner, Lawrence Alloway, Therese Schwartz, Helen Thomas (1977). Kunz, Don in Joellen Bard, Dore Ashton, Bruno Palmer-Poroner, Lawrence Alloway, Therese Schwartz, Helen Thomas, "Tenth Street Days : The Co-ops of the 50's / The Galleries : Tanager, Hansa, James, Camino, March, Brata, Phoenix, Area : an Artist-initiated Exhibition, Works from 1952 - 1962. Published by Education, Art & Service, Inc., New York, NY, 1977.
- Jalāl al-Dīn Rūmī, Maulana, 1207-1273. (1981). The story of the parrot & the merchant / Jalaluddin Mohammad Rumi; translated by Zahra Partovi; drawings by Don Kunz.. Published by Vincent FitzGerald and Company, New York, 1981.
- Robert Rindler (1995). Kunz, Don in Robert Rindler, The Cooper Union School of Art Painting Faculty Exhibition. New York: The Cooper Union School of Art. ISBN 0-9649687-1-1.
- Ginny Allen, Jody Klevit (1999). Kunz, Don in Ginny Allen and Jody Klevit, Oregon Painters: The First Hundred Years (1859 - 1959). Portland: Oregon Historical Society Press. ISBN 0-87595-271-2.
- Jerry Kelly, Alice Koeth (2000). Kunz, Don in Jerry Kelly, Alice Koeth, Artist & Alphabet: 20th Century Calligraphy and Letter Art in America. Boston: David Godine, in association with The American Institute of Graphic Arts and The Society of Scribes. ISBN 1-56792-118-3.
- Nancy Stock-Allen, Jerry Kelly (2022). The Thunderbolt and the Monk: Lloyd J.Reynolds and Robert J. Palladino. Published by The Book Club of California, ISBN 1732548242.

=== Group exhibition catalogues ===
Year	Author	Exhibition	Publisher
1977	Joellen Bard, Dore Ashton, Bruno Palmer-Poroner, Lawrence Alloway, Therese Schwartz, Helen Thomas	"Tenth Street Days: The Co-ops of the 1950s; Camino artists at Amos Eno Gallery"	Published by Education, Art & Service, Inc., New York, NY
1995	Robert Rindler	The Cooper Union School of Art: Painting Faculty Exhibition	Published by The Cooper Union for the Advancement of Science and Art, New York
2000	Jerry Kelly and Alice Koeth	Artist & Alphabet: 20th Century Calligraphy & Letter Art in America	Published by David R. Godine, Boston in Association with The American Institute of Graphic Arts and The Society of Scribes, New York

== See also ==
- Abstract Expressionism
- Lloyd J. Reynolds

== Sources ==
- Robert Rindler (1995). Kunz, Don in Robert Rindler, The Cooper Union School of Art Painting Faculty Exhibition. New York: The Cooper Union School of Art. ISBN 0-9649687-1-1.
- Ginny Allen, Jody Klevit (1999). Kunz, Don in Ginny Allen and Jody Klevit, Oregon Painters: The First Hundred Years (1859 - 1959). Portland: Oregon Historical Society Press. ISBN 0-87595-271-2.
- Jerry Kelly, Alice Koeth (2000). Kunz, Don in Jerry Kelly, Alice Koeth, Artist & Alphabet: 20th Century Calligraphy and Letter Art in America. Boston: David Godine, in association with The American Institute of Graphic Arts and The Society of Scribes. ISBN 1-56792-118-3.
