= Myron Stout =

American artist

- Born: April 27, 1908; Denton, Texas, U.S.
- Died: August 2, 1987 (aged 79); Chatham, Massachusetts, U.S.
- Occupation: Painter
- Known for: Abstract art, geometric abstraction, minimalism

Myron Stout (1908 – August 2, 1987) was an American abstract painter whose geometric paintings and drawings bridged the styles of Abstract Expressionism and Minimalism.

He was born in Denton, Texas. During his senior year at North Texas State University he decided to become a painter, but his progress was halting. He worked as a teacher, and spent part of his time painting landscapes, none of which are known to survive. After military service in World War II, he resumed painting with renewed commitment. In 1946 he began studies with Hans Hofmann. Stout's works of the period 1947–1952 show the influence of European geometric painting, and typically feature multiple intersecting vertical and horizontal bands of color. After about 1950, single forms rather than patterns dominated some of his paintings.

In 1952 Stout relocated to Provincetown. In the autumn of that year his readings of Greek mythology, especially the tragedies of Sophocles and Aeschylus, inspired a new direction in his art. Working in black and white, usually on a small scale, he painted flat monolithic shapes which often resembled forks, shields, or lyres.

Stout worked slowly and crafted his images with great care. He had an independent income and was not concerned with selling his work. His mature work has been described by Hilton Kramer as "a mode of abstraction small in scale, purist in form and intimate in feeling—an art utterly devoid of expressionist bravura and emotional display."

Although he rarely exhibited, in 1954 he displayed charcoal drawings and paintings at the Stable Gallery in New York, and in 1957 he showed at the Hansa Gallery in New York. He was awarded a Guggenheim Fellowship in 1969.

Stout had a retrospective at the Contemporary Arts Museum in Houston in 1977, and a retrospective at the Whitney Museum of American Art in 1980.

Myron Stout died of lung cancer in Chatham, Massachusetts in 1987.

The Museum of Modern Art and the Carnegie Museum of Art are among the public collections holding works by Myron Stout. Selections from the Journals of Myron Stout was published in 2005 by Midmarch Arts Press.
