= William King (artist) =

American sculptor (1925–2015)

- Born: 25 February 1925; Jacksonville, Florida
- Died: 4 March 2015 (aged 90); East Hampton, New York
- Education: University of Florida; Cooper Union
- Occupation: American sculptor

William King (25 February 1925 – 4 March 2015) was a contemporary American sculptor born in Jacksonville, Florida, in 1925. His work spanned countless media and usually revolved around the figurative portrayal of human figures. After attending the University of Florida, King moved to New York in 1945 and graduated from Cooper Union in 1948. His style was mostly abstraction and pop art. During the years of 1994 to 1998, he served as the president of the National Academy of Design. In 2007, King was the recipient of the Lifetime Achievement in Contemporary Sculpture Award given by the International Sculpture Center.
