= Lois Dodd =

American painter (b. 1927)

- Born: 1927 (age 98–99); Montclair, New Jersey, U.S.
- Education: Cooper Union
- Occupations: Visual artist, educator
- Known for: Painting

Lois Dodd (born 1927), is an American painter and educator. Dodd was a key member of New York's postwar art scene. She played a large part and was involved in the wave of modern artists including Alex Katz and Yvonne Jacquette who explored the coast of Maine in the latter half of the 20th century.

== Biography ==
Lois Dodd was born in 1927, in Montclair, New Jersey. She received education at the Cooper Union in New York City from 1945 to 1948, before continuing her training in Rome from 1949-1950.

She is one of the founders and an active member of the Tanager Gallery, which was integral to the Tenth Street-avant-garde scene of the 1950s where artists began running their own coop galleries. Of the original founders, she was the only woman. She exhibited at Tanager Gallery from 1952 to 1962. From 1969 to 1976, she exhibited at the Green Mountain Gallery. From 1971 to 1992, Dodd taught at Brooklyn College and at the Skowhegan School of Painting and Sculpture, where she served on the Board beginning in 1980 and is now Governor Emerita.

In 1992, she retired from teaching at Brooklyn College. Since 1954, her work has been the subject of over fifty one-person exhibitions. Dodd is an elected member of the American Academy and Institute of Arts and Letters and of the National Academy of Design. She currently lives in New York and works in Maine. In a 2011 interview, Dodd said of the original Tanager gallery: "In 1952...I was married to Bill King and we had an apartment on 29th Street. Ely was born in ’52 at just about the same time we opened the gallery. Angelo Ippolito, Charles Cajori, Fred Mitchell, King, and myself were the original group. Bill King and I were in Italy on his Fulbright where we met Angelo and Fred there on the G.I. Bill. Cajori had been at Skowhegan with Bill. We had reunited in New York after our return from Italy...It was on 4th Street in this tiny space that had been a barbershop. The elevated subway was still running up and down the Bowery. There was a bar across the street and a lot of Bowery guys were around the corner, completely different than it is now."

As part of the wave of New York modernists to explore the coast of Maine just after the end of the second World War, Dodd helped to change the face of painting in the state. Along with Fairfield Porter, Rackstraw Downes, Alex Katz, Charles DuBack, and Neil Welliver, Dodd began spending her summers in the Mid-Coast region surrounding Penobscot Bay. Attracted by inexpensive old farmhouses, verdant fields, and the bright sunshine, they sought both companionship and an escape from the demands of city life. The break from the city and its urbane art circles allowed them the freedom to explore new modes of painting, both landscapes and figures, that were anathema in the era of Abstract Expressionism.

== Work ==
Dodd is known primarily for her observational paintings of landscapes, nudes and still lives. As the artist stated in an interview, "I would find it, see it, and say 'that's exciting' but I don't want to set things up." It is in her finding and framing of the everyday that something quietly original and deeply felt permeates the work. By painting her immediate circumstances, Dodd rejected the sources that others of her generation took as a given: Abtract Expressionism, mass media, and popular culture. Instead, she remained an advocate for realism, and was committed to painting the everyday visual world with a strict, geometric style inspired by the works of Mondrian and Charles Sheeler. There is nothing glitzy about the work, neither in its subject matter nor in her use of materials. She is often drawn to unpopulated or abandoned locations such as quarries, ponds, and woods, evoking a sense of loneliness. She does not celebrate excess, ownership, or leisure, nor does she condemn it. Whether or not she intends her refusals to be a comment on the work of those around her, her paintings embody an implicit critique of those who believe acquisitiveness, possession, and leisure are integral to the pursuit of happiness. When asked about her art career, Dodd disliked the word "practice" being used as a descriptor, commenting, "Doctors and Lawyers have a 'practice,' artists have a life"

== Exhibitions ==
Catching the light, this was the first career museum retrospective for Dodd in 2013. It features paintings that represent the places and subjects that have mattered most to her in her 60 years as an artist. They include views of New York City's Lower East Side as seen from her apartment windows and imagery from the woods and gardens of Maine, and some winter scenes by her family's home in New Jersey. The exhibition featured about 51 works that ranged in date from the 1950s to 2010s.

Other recent exhibitions include:

- (2025) Lois Dodd: Framing the Ephemeral, Kunstmuseum Den Haag, The Hague, The Netherlands
- (2023) Lois Dodd: Natural Order, The Bruce Museum, Greenwich, CT
- (2019) Lois Dodd: Flashings, Philipp Haverkampf Galeire, Berlin Modern Art, London, England
- (2019) Downtown Painting, curated by Alex Katz, Peter Freeman, Inc., New York City, New York
- (2019) LandEscape: New Visions of the Landscape from the Early 20th and 21st Centuries, Katonah Museum of Art, Katonah, New York
- (2019) Lois Dodd: Paintings and Drawings, Ogunquit Museum of Modern Art, Ogunquit, Maine
- (2018) Lois Dodd: Early Work, Alexandre Gallery, New York City, New York
- (2017) Lois Dodd: Windows and Reflections, List Gallery, Swarthmore College, Swarthmore, Pennsylvania

== Collections ==
In addition to her numerous exhibitions, her work remains in the collections of many art museums, including at the Smithsonian American Art Museum, Washington, D.C.; Kemper Museum of Contemporary Art, Kansas City, Missouri; Bowdoin College Art Museum; The Museum of Modern Art, New York; Cooper Hewitt Museum; National Portrait Gallery, Washington D.C.; Museo dell’Arte, Udine, Italy; Farnsworth Art Museum, Rockland, Maine; Whitney Museum of American Art, New York City; Portland Museum of Art, Portland, Maine; Wadsworth Athenaeum, Hartford, Connecticut; National Academy of Design, New York, New York; Kalamazoo Art Center, Kalamazoo, Michigan; and Knoxville Museum of Art, Knoxville, Tennessee.

== Awards and honors ==
Grants and awards

- 2007 Benjamin West Clinedinst Medal, Artists’ Fellowship
- 2005 Augustus St. Gaudens Distinguished Alumni Award, Cooper Union
- 2004 Honorary Degree Old Lyme Academy
- 1991 American Academy and Institute of Arts and Letters, Hassam, Speicher, Betts and Symons Purchase Prize
- 1990 National Academy of Design—Henry Ward Ranger Purchase Award
- 1987 Cooper Union Distinguished Alumni Citation
- 1987 National Academy of Design—Leonilda S. Gervas Award
- 1986 American Academy and Institute of Arts and Letters Award
- 1971 Ingram Merrill Foundation Grant
- 1962 Longview Foundation Purchase Award
- 1959–1960 Italian Government Study Grant

Memberships

- 1998 to date American Academy & Institute of Arts & Letters
- 1990–1993 Colby College Museum Advisory Board
- 1988 to date National Academy of Design
- Chairperson, Board of Governors 1986–1988, Skowhegan School of Painting and Sculpture
- Board of Governors 1980 to date, Skowhegan School of Painting and Sculpture
- 1977 Board of Advisors, Artist's Choice Museum
- 1972–1974 Board Member, the Lower East Side Printshop, East 4th Street, New York
- 1972–1975 Chairperson, Cooper Square Community Development Committee
- 1962–1975 Artist's Housing committee, Cooper Square
- 1952–1962 Tanager Gallery, a founder
