= 1961 in art =

Events from the year 1961 in art.

== Events ==
- January 5 – Italian sculptor Alfredo Fioravanti goes to the United States consulate in Rome to confess that he was part of the team that forged the Etruscan terracotta warriors in the Metropolitan Museum of Art.
- March 2 – Release of British film The Rebel starring Tony Hancock, satirizing artistic pretensions.
- March 17 – Publication in the United States of Irving Stone's biographical novel of Michelangelo, The Agony and the Ecstasy.
- May 29–June 17 – War Babies exhibition at the Huysman Gallery in Los Angeles featuring the work of Joe Goode, Larry Bell, Ed Bereal and Ron Miyashiro. Controversy generated by the exhibition's poster leads to the gallery closing down soon after the exhibition ends.
- August 21 – Goya's Portrait of the Duke of Wellington is stolen from the National Gallery in London, three weeks after first going on display there, intended as ransom in Kempton Bunton's campaign for free television licences for pensioners. It is returned 4 years later.
- October–December – Henri Matisse's 1953 paper-cut Le Bateau is hung upside down in the Museum of Modern Art in New York.
- First Fluxus event organised by George Maciunas at the AG Gallery in New York.
- Yves Klein patents his use of International Klein Blue.

== Exhibitions ==
October 4 until November 12 - The Art of Assemblage at MoMA in New York City.

== Awards ==
- Archibald Prize: William Edwin Pidgeon – Rabbi Dr I Porush
- John Moores Painting Prize: Henry Mundy for "Cluster"

== Works ==
- Alexander Archipenko – Queen of Sheba (sculpture)
- Thomas Hart Benton – Independence and the Opening of the West
- Peter Blake – Self-portrait with badges
- Nicola Cantore and Luigi Gheno – Rudolph Valentino memorial in Castellaneta, Italy
- Jacob Epstein (died 1959) – The Rush of Green (bronze)
- M. C. Escher – Waterfall (lithograph)
- Lucio Fontana - Concetto Spaziale Mezzogiorno in Piazza S. Marco
- Jane Frank – Crags and Crevices
- Alberto Giacometti – L'Homme qui marche I (bronze)
- Rodney Gordon – Michael Faraday Memorial (Elephant and Castle, London)
- Barbara Hepworth – Curved Form (Bryher) (bronze)
- David Hockney – We Two Boys Together Clinging
- Edward Hopper – A Woman in the Sun
- Friedensreich Hundertwasser – Houses in Rain of Blood
- Jasper Johns – Map
- Gerald Kelly – Ralph Vaughan Williams
- Mati Klarwein – Annunciation
- Yves Klein – Blue Monochrome
- Roy Lichtenstein
  - Electric Cord
  - Engagement Ring
  - Girl with Ball
  - I Can See the Whole Room...and There's Nobody in It!
  - Look Mickey
  - Mr. Bellamy
  - Roto Broil
- Morris Louis – Beta Lambda
- Piero Manzoni – Artist's Shit (90 tin cans)
- Joan Miró – Bleu II
- Robert Motherwell – Black on White
- Pablo Picasso – Jacqueline
- Bridget Riley – Movement in Squares
- Mark Rothko – Orange, Red, Yellow
- William Scott – Mural for Altnagelvin Hospital, Derry
- Tony Smith – Cigarette (1/3) (environmental sculpture)
- David Wynne – Gorilla (polished marble, Crystal Palace Park, London)
- Yakovenko and Baranov – Garibaldi Monument in Taganrog
- Sacred Heart of Jesus (Indianapolis; approximate date)
- Stucco statue of Paul Bunyan (Trees of Mystery, Klamath, California)

== Births ==
- March 9 – Jo Ractliffe, South African photographer
- March 26 – Leigh Bowery, Australian performance artist, club promoter, actor, model and fashion designer (d. 1994)
- April 28 – Grenville Davey, English sculptor, winner of the Turner Prize
- August 12 – Karsten Schubert, German-born London art dealer (d. 2019)
- September 21 – Kurt Jackson, English landscape painter
- October 24 – Lita Cabellut, Spanish painter

== Deaths ==
- January 30 – John Duncan Fergusson, Scottish Colourist painter (b. 1874)
- February 11 – Kate Carew, American caricaturist (b. 1869)
- February 20 – Jane Emmet de Glehn, American painter (b. 1873)
- March – Stanley Royle, English post-impressionist landscape painter (b. 1888)
- April 7 – Vanessa Bell, English painter and designer (b. 1879)
- April 20 – Ado Vabbe, Estonian painter (b. 1892)
- June 6 – Alfons Karpiński, Polish painter (b. 1875)
- July 6 – Cuno Amiet, Swiss painter and sculptor (b. 1868)
- July 12 – Iva Despić-Simonović, Croatian sculptor (b. 1891)
- August 3 – Hilda Rix Nicholas, Australian painter (b. 1884)
- August 13 – Mario Sironi, Italian painter (b. 1885)
- October 1 – Sir William Reid Dick, Scottish sculptor (b. 1879)
- October 7 – Duilio Barnabè, Italian painter (b. 1914)
- October 13 – Augustus John, Welsh painter (b. 1878)
- December 9 – Kosta Hakman, Serbian painter (b. 1899)
- December 13 – Grandma Moses, American folk artist (b. 1860)
- Full date unknown – Albert Swinden, English-born American painter (b. 1901)

== See also ==
- 1961 in fine arts of the Soviet Union
