= Green Gallery =

Coordinates: 40°45′49.32″N 73°58′31.16″W

The Green Gallery was an art gallery that operated between 1960 and 1965 at 15 West 57th Street in Manhattan, New York City. The gallery's director was Richard Bellamy, and its financial backer was the art collector Robert Scull. Green Gallery is noted for giving early visibility to a number of artists who soon rose to prominence, such as Yayoi Kusama, Mark di Suvero, Donald Judd, and George Segal.

== History ==
Prior to starting the Green Gallery, Bellamy was co-director of the Hansa Gallery, an artists' cooperative gallery in New York's 10th Street gallery district that had moved uptown. He brought his deep connections with downtown artists with him to his new enterprise, which joined a small number of uptown galleries focused on new American art. These included Leo Castelli (founded only a few years before Green) and the somewhat older Sidney Janis and Stable Galleries.

The genesis of the Green Gallery was Robert Scull's interest around 1959 in discovering and securing works by new artists directly, without having to deal with a gallery. While he had been making time to visit studios, he had a business to run and believed a gallery of his own would enable him to reap the benefits of this kind of research without the investment of time. He initially approached Ivan Karp to run the gallery, and Karp referred him to Bellamy. Scull was a silent backer of the business, in order not to interfere with his relationships with other galleries.

While the Green Gallery was not a commercial success, it was distinguished by Bellamy's wide-ranging taste and his presentation of artists working in directions that soon became recognized as vital trends. The gallery's short history spanned a vibrant period in the New York art world; it showcased a diverse group of artists who were giving shape to styles that would soon be labeled Color Field painting, Pop Art and Minimalism.

== Notable artists ==
Artists receiving important first shows at the Green Gallery during its five-year run included: Mark di Suvero, Lucas Samaras, James Rosenquist, Claes Oldenburg (first uptown show), George Segal (first show as a sculptor), Robert Morris, Donald Judd (first show as a sculptor), Larry Poons and Dan Flavin. Although Bellamy did not represent Andy Warhol, Green was the first American gallery to exhibit one of his Pop paintings, 200 One Dollar Bills (1962), included in a 1962 group show.

The gallery also presented the work of artists such as Tom Wesselmann, Alfred Leslie, Milet Andrejevic, Robert Beauchamp, Neil Williams, Philip Wofford, Ralph Humphrey, Ronald Bladen, Richard Smith, Sally Hazelet Drummond, Pat Passlof, and Tadaaki Kuwayama. Other artists who exhibited in group exhibitions there included Kenneth Noland, Ellsworth Kelly, Yayoi Kusama, Frank Stella, John Chamberlain, Daniel Spoerri, George Brecht, Miles Forst, Walter Darby Bannard, Robert Whitman, Julius Hatofsky, Burgoyne Diller, Myron Stout, Richard Stankiewicz, Lester Johnson, James Lee Byars, Sidney Tillim, Charles Ginnever, Anthony Magar, Felix Pasilis, Alice Mason, H.C. Westermann, Lee Lozano, Joan Jacobs, Lilly Brody, Jean Follett, Aristedemos Kaldis, Leslie Kerr, Kaymar, Peter Agostini, Phillip Pavia, Franz Kline, among others.

== See also ==
- Mr. Bellamy, a 1961 painting by Roy Lichtenstein that may poke fun at Richard Bellamy's authoritative presence in the art world.
