= Statues of Paul Bunyan =

There are a number of statues of Paul Bunyan on display in the United States.

== Portland, Oregon ==
A statue of Paul Bunyan is the 31-foot-tall (9.4 m) concrete and metal sculpture which has stood in the Kenton neighborhood of Portland, Oregon since 1959.

== Bangor, Maine ==
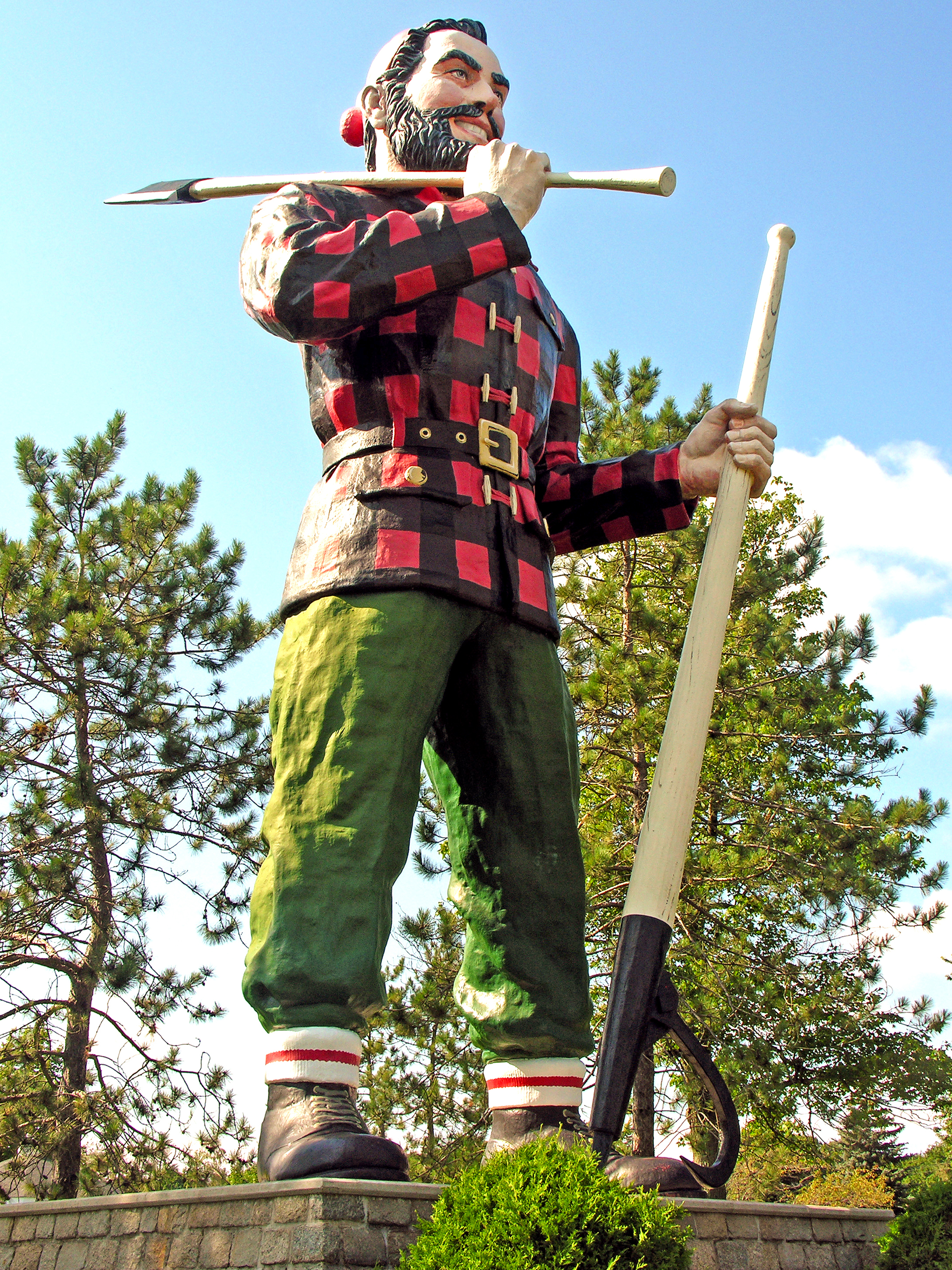
Paul Bunyan statue in Bangor, Maine

Another 31-foot (9.4 m) statue can be found in Bangor, Maine. Standing since 1959, it weighs 3700 pounds. The statue is shown with a large axe in one hand, and a peavey in the other hand.

== Klamath, California ==
At the Trees of Mystery in Klamath, California there is the 49-foot (15 m) tallest known statue of Paul Bunyan."

== Cheshire, Connecticut ==
When the 26-foot "Muffler Man" Paul Bunyan was erected in front of a local lumber business in the 1980s, the town objected to the statue, citing that it was a violation of town codes given its substantial height. Finding no limitation on flagpole height on the books, the owners of the statue replaced Bunyan's axe with an American flag.

== Rocky Mount, North Carolina ==
Located off Exit 145 of I-95 in Rocky Mount, NC, a 40-foot Paul Bunyan statue stands as advertisement for Log Cabin Homes sales center. This statue was purchased from a family owned entertainment center in Brainerd, Minnesota, and relocated to North Carolina in 2011.

== Others ==
Smaller (although still larger than life) statues can also be found in:

- Muncie, Indiana
- Akeley, Minnesota
- Bemidji, Minnesota
- Brainerd, Minnesota
- Manistique, Michigan
- Ossineke, Michigan
- St. Ignace, Michigan
- Aberdeen, South Dakota
- Lakewood, Wisconsin
- Wabeno, Wisconsin.
- Tucson, Arizona

Paul Bunyan's Log Chute, an amusement park ride inside Bloomington, Minnesota's Mall of America, also houses large statues of Paul Bunyan and Babe the Blue Ox.

The Paul Bunyan Logging Camp Museum at Carson Park in Eau Claire, Wisconsin, has statues of Paul Bunyan and Babe the Blue Ox.

The Rumford, Maine Visitor Center is home to giant statues of Paul Bunyan and Babe the Blue Ox.

In Stony Point, New York, at local Scout Camp Bullowa, there is a 18 foot tall Paul Bunyan statue at the southern entrance.

There is also a 19-foot Paul Bunyan in the Enchanted Forest Water Safari in Old Forge, New York, that was built in 1956.

A Paul Bunyan statue stands in Albuquerque, New Mexico, on historic Route 66. The fiberglass figure is a well-known roadside landmark and one of the city's surviving examples of mid-century roadside Americana.
