= Douglas Memorial Bridge =

Bridge on US Route 101 destroyed in 1964

Coordinates: 41.5241°N 124.0451°W

Klamath River and Douglas Memorial Bridge, Governors Richardson (California) and Pierce (Oregon), the antiquated Klamath River ferry being retired, and one of the grizzly bear sculptures

The Douglas Memorial Bridge connected California to Oregon as part of U.S. Route 101. It was named after late California Assemblyman G.H. Douglas who had introduced the 1923 legislature to approve the project, estimated at $225,000, but having a final cost of $400,000 (equivalent to $5.66 million in 2024). The bridge spanned the Klamath River about three miles (4.8 km) from its mouth. Work commenced July 1924 and the bridge was completed and dedicated on May 17, 1926. It opened to traffic on October 30, 1926. Prior to its completion, the crossing was served by antiquated ferries which only operated in fair weather. It was lauded as "one of the most beautiful and practical pieces of bridge construction in the country", by the president of the Downtown Association of San Francisco.

The bridge was 1,147 feet (350 m) long with five main arch spans each 210 feet (64 m) long and short approach spans at each end. Three men lost their lives during the construction. Upon completion, it was the largest structure of its kind in the state highway system.

Each of the four pylons of the bridge featured a sculpture of a large grizzly bear, the symbol of the state of California.

The bridge was destroyed in the Great Christmas Flood of 1964, which also destroyed 98% of the riverbank town of Klamath. The disaster killed 11 people and caused an estimated $300 million in damage. The bridge was temporarily repaired, but was replaced less than a year later with a new four-lane bridge a-half mile (0.80 km) upstream. The western stub of the Douglas Memorial Bridge was preserved, with its pair of eight-ton concrete grizzly bear statues, as a memorial.
