= Paul Bunyan in popular culture =

Since the folkloric hero Paul Bunyan's first major appearance in print, the character has been utilized to promote a variety of products, locations, and services. The giant lumberjack's mass appeal has led him to become a recurring figure in entertainment and marketing, appearing in various incarnations throughout popular culture.

== Popular culture ==
- Bunyan is referenced in the chapter of the second volume of John Dos Passos's U.S.A. trilogy.
- Paul Bunyan is an operetta composed of two acts and a prologue composed in 1941 by Benjamin Britten to libretto W. H. Auden.
- Maddox Brothers and Rose recorded a song called "Paul Bunyan Love" in the 1950s.
- Bunyan is featured in the 1958 Disney animated short Paul Bunyan, as well as Disney's 1995 film Tall Tale: The Unbelievable Adventures of Pecos Bill.
- He is mentioned in The Magnetic Fields song "Grand Canyon", from their album 69 Love Songs.
- In the Simpsons episode "Simpsons Tall Tales", the story of Paul Bunyan is told, with Homer Simpson playing Bunyan.
- The webcomic The Adventures of Dr. McNinja features a disease called "Paul Bunyan's disease", which causes people to grow into axe-wielding giants.
- In professional wrestling, a move in which a wrestler puts their opponent's legs on either side of the ringpost, then pulls them, forcing the opponents' groin into the post, is sometimes called a "Paul Bunyan."
- Paul Bunyan is the subject of a story featured in the "Big Boys Don't Cry" episode of The Puzzle Place, in which, when Babe is so ill that Paul cannot help him, he cries, eventually making the Great Salt Lake.
- A statue of Paul Bunyan along with Babe appears in the level Roadside Destruction from the 2009 video game Tornado Outbreak.
- Paul Bunyan is an achievement in the 2010 video game Civilization V. It is given for chopping down the in-game forest 1,000 times.
- The 8th track of the album Danza IIII: The Alpha – The Omega by extreme metal band The Tony Danza Tapdance Extravaganza is titled "Paul Bunyan and the Blue Ox."
- The Phineas and Ferb episode "Greece Lightning" features a restaurant called Paul Bunyan's Pancake House, which has decorative fiberglass statues of Paul Bunyan and Babe the Blue Ox outside. When Norm the robot crashes into the Babe statue and gets the statue's head stuck onto his own head, Phineas mistakes him for the Minotaur of Greek legend.
- Shel Silverstein's poetry collection "Where the Sidewalk Ends" features a poem titled "Paul Bunyan", about the character. Paul, at 90 years old, claims that "sunshine & sorrow, [he has] seen it all", and decides to die and ascend to Heaven. He is buried by the mournful lumberjacks of the town, but one night he awakens from his "death", expressing his dislike of Heaven as there are no trees to chop down. He leaps onto Babe the Blue Ox and rides away in search of Hell, hoping that there are trees to chop down there.
- In Marvel Comic's "Avengers" #10, (1960s) Immortus summons Paul Bunyan to fight the Executioner.
- The Bugs Bunny cartoon, Lumber Jack-Rabbit, states that Bugs knew Paul Bunyan.
- Mr Bunyan appears as a giant in the Fables (comics) graphic novel spin-off 'Jack of Fables'.
- In the Breath of Fire video game series, there is a recurring woodcutter character named Bunyan.
- In the MMORPG Guild Wars 2, there is a gathering axe called the Bun Yan Axe.
- Paul Bunyan is the antagonist in the film Axe Giant: The Wrath of Paul Bunyan.
- Each year two universities, the University of Michigan and Michigan State University play a football game, famously known as the "Battle for the Paul Bunyan Trophy".
- Each year the two Universities, University of Wisconsin and University of Minnesota play a football game, for the Paul Bunyan Axe trophy.
- A fictional version of the Paul Bunyan statue in Brainerd, Minnesota, is featured throughout the Coen brothers's 1996 film Fargo.
- Rankin/Bass animated "The Ballad of Paul Bunyan" as part of their Festival of Family Classics series on January 7, 1973
- A gender-bend version of Paul Bunyan appears in the mobile game, Fate/Grand Order, as a Berserker-class Servant.
- In the Carl Barks Uncle Scrooge comic story "The Paul Bunyan Machine", first published in 1959, a large forest harvesting machine is named after Paul Bunyan.
- Episode 3 of season 1 of Big Mouth starts with a trailer for a fictional movie "Paul Bunyan New York City", starring Dwayne Johnson as Paul Bunyan.
- A giant Paul Bunyan statue is brought to life and attacks the character Richie in the film It Chapter Two.
- The story of Paul Bunyan is told in the season 5 episode Tall Titan Tales of the animated television series Teen Titans Go!.
- Gottlieb pinball manufacturer made a 2 players machine based on this theme: IPDB #1768
- The animated Disney show Gravity Falls features Paul Bunyan in its title sequence as well as his statue being in the season 2 episode Roadside Attraction.
- In the 2018 action-adventure video game Red Dead Redemption 2, there is a point of interest called "Giant Remains" which references Paul Bunyan and Babe the Blue Ox.
- In Kim Stanley Robinson's Mars trilogy, Paul Bunyan is referenced several times as part of Martian folklore, in which a legendary fight between Bunyan and 'Big Man' shaped the surface of the planet.
- In the Magic: The Gathering Expansion 'Outlaws of Thunder Junction', the card "Bonny Pall, Clearcutter" alludes to Paul Bunyan and Babe the Blue Ox, with their names altered into "Bonny Pall" and "Beau".

== Tourist attractions ==
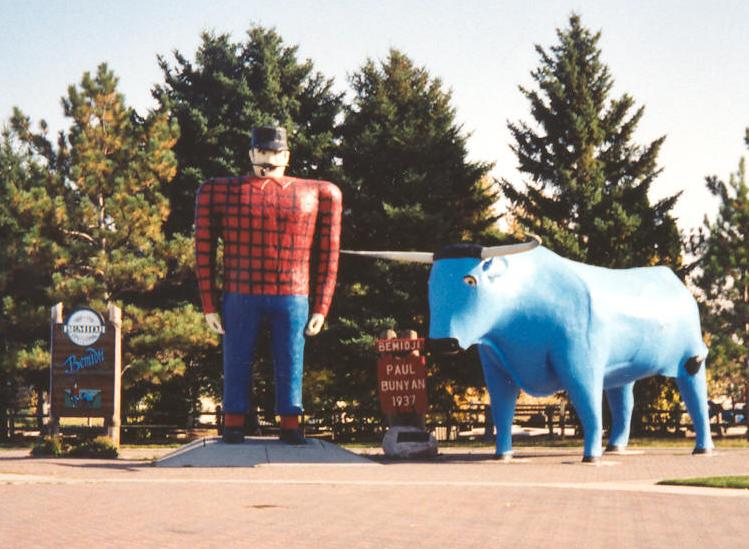
Paul Bunyan and Babe the Blue Ox statues in Bemidji, Minnesota.

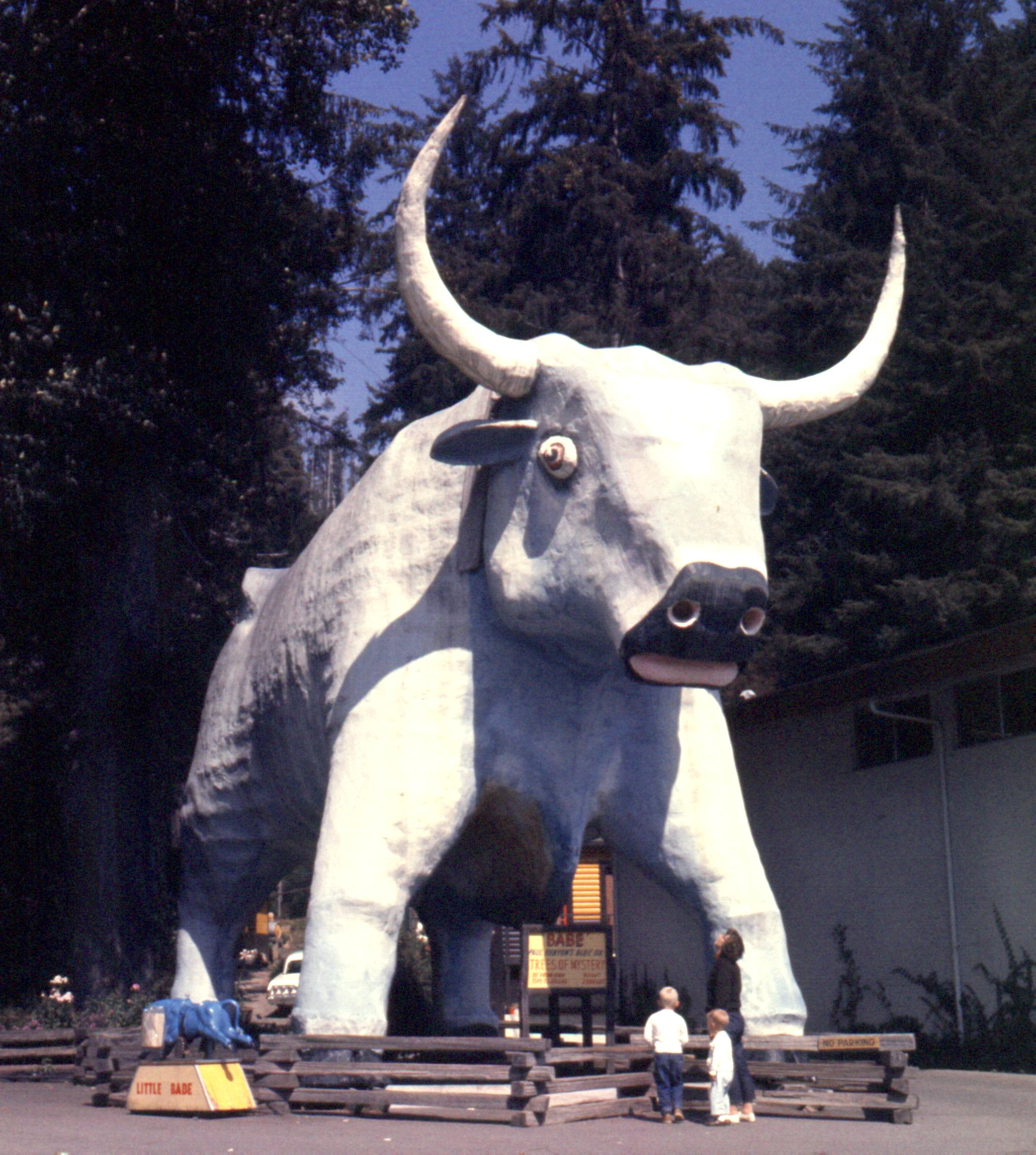
30-foot (9 m) tall statue of Babe the Blue Ox at Trees of Mystery, Klamath, California.

- The state of Michigan has declared Oscoda, Michigan, as the official home of Paul Bunyan because it had the earliest documented published stories by MacGillivray. Other towns such as Bemidji, Brainerd, Shelton, Westwoo; Bay City; Wahoo; Eau Claire; and Bangor also claim the title.
- Kelliher, Minnesota, is the home of Paul Bunyan Memorial Park, which contains a site purporting to be Paul Bunyan's grave. Another legend claims that Rib Mountain in Wausau, Wisconsin, is Bunyan's grave site.
- The Paul Bunyan Council of the Boy Scouts of America was active in Midland, Michigan, from 1951 to 1971 and two Order of the Arrow lodges have their original roots tied into the fable of Paul Bunyan. OA Lodge 196, Mesabi, from Hibbing, Minnesota, used Paul Bunyan as its lodge totem from 1941 to 1995. OA Lodge 26, Blue Ox, from Rochester, Minnesota, has used the Blue Ox exclusively as its lodge totem and on nearly all patches and neckerchiefs since 1927.
- The most famous statues of Paul Bunyan and Babe the Blue Ox are in Bemidji, Minnesota, and are listed on the National Register of Historic Places. The Bemidji Blue Ox Marathon race course runs past the statues.
- Paul Bunyan Land, a popular amusement park 7 miles (11 km) east of Brainerd, Minnesota, features a talking statue of Paul with a statue of Babe. Previously located in Baxter, the original Paul Bunyan Land park closed in 2003 to make room for new commercial development. The moving, talking, seated Paul Bunyan was then moved east of Brainerd to its current location at This Old Farm.
- Trees of Mystery, a roadside attraction in Klamath, California, features a 49 ft (15 m) tall statue of Bunyan and a 35 ft (10 m) tall statue of Babe. In November 2007 the statue of Babe's head fell off due to rain and old, rotted materials giving way. It has since been repaired.
- Bunyan is depicted on the world's largest wood carving, at the entrance to Sequoia National Park in California.
- There are 30-foot-tall (9.1 m) Paul Bunyan statues at Paul Bunyan's Northwoods Cook Shanty locations in Minocqua, Wisconsin, and in Wisconsin Dells, Wisconsin.
- Two college football trophies have a connection to the legendary lumberjack. The University of Minnesota Golden Gophers and University of Wisconsin Badgers have played for Paul Bunyan's Axe since the 1940s.
- The unincorporated town of Union Lake, Michigan, previously held an annual Paul Bunyan Festival every year in July. The festival was sponsored and run by several local charitable and civic groups, including the Jaycees and the Chamber of Commerce, but was discontinued in the 1990s.
- Hackensack, Minnesota is said to be the home of Lucette, Paul Bunyan's sweetheart. The park downtown has the statue of Lucette and their son, Paul Jr.
- The character of Paul Bunyan features prominently in Jon Ludwig's Paul Bunyan & the Tall Tale Medicine Show at the Center for Puppetry Arts in Atlanta, Georgia
- The City of Fort Bragg, California, has been celebrating "Paul Bunyan Days" since 1939. Taking place on Labor Day Weekend, it includes rock shows, ugly dog contests, tricycle races, a logging show, and a Labor Day Parade.
- There is a big statue of Paul Bunyan in Squamish, British Columbia, Canada.
- The Log Chute flume ride (formerly known as 'Paul Bunyan's Log Chute') at the Nickelodeon Universe Park (formerly Knott's Camp Snoopy) at the Mall of America in Bloomington, Minnesota, features large animatronic Paul Bunyan and Babe statues, as well as associated characters from the legends.
- There is a statue of Paul Bunyan holding a hot dog in Atlanta, Illinois. Although originally he held an axe, the axe was replaced with the hot dog due to its use as a symbol for Bunyon's restaurant in Cicero, Illinois. The statue was moved to Atlanta, Illinois, when the restaurant closed down in 2003.
