= Christopher Fitzgerald (artist) =

American painter

- Born: 1977 (age 48–49)
- Education: Yale, Penn State
- Known for: Contemporary art
- Awards: Texas Commission on the Arts

Christopher Miñán Fitzgerald is an American artist based in Austin, Texas. Born in 1977, he graduated from Western Washington University in 1999 having studied under Ed Bereal. After his college education, Fitzgerald spent the summer in Italy and France studying art and returned to Seattle where he first began exhibiting his paintings. His first solo show sold out in the fall of 1999 during the WTO protests. Austin Chronicle visual arts writer Rachel Koper listed him as one of her "favorite individual artists of 2004" and one of her "favorite artists by body of work in 2005". Shortlisted for Austin Museum of Art's 22-To-Watch 2005 exhibition and the Arthouse Texas Prize in 2006, he then studied at the Yale University School of Art in the summer of 2008. Fitzgerald received his MFA from Penn State University under advisors Brian Alfred and Robert Yarber. He currently holds an appointment as associate professor of art at Concordia University Texas. His paintings are featured in the New American Paintings publication and the White Columns Artist Registry. He received an award from the Texas Commission on the Arts in 2023 for his first solo museum exhibition with the International Museum of Art & Science.
