= Tillim =

Tillim is a surname. Notable people with the surname include:

- Guy Tillim (born 1962), South African photographer
- Sidney Tillim (1925–2001), American artist and art critic
