= Jean Follett =

American sculptor

Jean Follett (June 5, 1917 – July 6, 1990) was an American painter and one of the innovators of assemblage art in the United States. She was a member of the New York abstract art movement of the 1940s and 1950s.

== Early life and education ==
Jean Francis Follett was born in 1917 to Sherman Follett, a mail carrier, and Helen (Nellie) Crapsey Follett, a former school teacher. She had one older sister, Margaret. The family lived on the East Side of St. Paul, Minnesota and attended St. Paul's Unity Unitarian Church.

Follett attended Cleveland Junior High and Johnson Senior High School before enrolling as an undergraduate at the University of Minnesota. She studied art with Cameron Booth and LeRoy Turner at the St. Paul Gallery and School of Art in the late 1930s. During World War II, Follett served in the Women's Army Corps (WAC), at the Fort Des Moines Provisional Army Officer Training School in Des Moines, Iowa. After finishing her service in 1946, she moved to New York City.

In New York, Follett studied with Hans Hofmann and was a founding member of the Hansa gallery cooperative. Her friend and fellow Hofmann student Allan Kaprow later recalled that, during group critiques, Hofmann almost universally praised Follett's work. Alongside the compositional techniques on which Hofmann's instruction was focused, Follett referenced Surrealism and Dada as major influences on her practice. In 1950-51 she traveled to Paris for further study.

== Career ==
Around 1950, Follett began to develop a style that bridged painting and sculptural construction, using thick layers of paint embedded with found objects to create paintings that resembled relief sculptures. Among the objects used in these works are tools, machine parts, light switches, nails, springs, and pieces of pipe. Follett's assemblage techniques elevated the everyday objects and debris, using a two-dimensional picture plane to transform three-dimensional objects into abstract forms.

Follett was one of the first American artists to use junk metal to create such hybrid objects, and her technique influenced the style of her studio mate, Richard Stankiewicz, a sculptor who also studied with Hofmann. She and Stankiewicz shared a workspace on Bond Street, and exhibited together at the Hansa space in 1953 or 1954. The pair cultivated a friendship with Jean Dubuffett, whose studio was just down the block; his art brut style informed Follett's approach to figuration and abstraction.

Follett was active in the independent gallery and New York School scenes: Robert Frank referred to her as his favorite artist, and Richard Bellamy often came by for studio visits. Bellamy would later cite her influence on the work of several of her contemporaries, including Jim Dine, James Rosenquist, and George Segal.

Her work was included in the 1954 Guggenheim exhibit Younger American Painters, in the Group 3 show at Rutgers University in 1959, and in Sam Wagstaff's landmark 1964 exhibit "Black, White, and Grey." She had work exhibited in three shows at the Museum of Modern Art in the 1960s, including the international survey The Art of Assemblage (1961). She also showed at the Green Gallery under the direction of Richard Bellamy and Ivan Karp.

The high prices that she asked for her work, even in the first years of the cooperative Hansa gallery's existence, were shocking to her fellow artists. This may have been a strategy intended to maintain her ownership of her artwork, or to stave off the disappointment associated with her paintings frequently failing to sell. The art collector Horace Richter was one of the few to successfully purchase one of her works. Because her art career was not financially profitable, a predicament familiar to many of her peers, Follett supported herself as a freelance drafter.

Follett's career faltered after a promising spate of shows and attention that lasted from the mid-1950s to the early 1960s. A 1962 studio fire destroyed much of her existing artwork and that loss, combined with declining health and financial instability, turned out to be insurmountable. Follett went back to Minnesota, where she also had a studio, intending to take only a brief time away. Although she would continue to travel to New York to see shows, she never returned to her work there full-time.

== Personal life ==
In 1946, Jean Follett married Alan Shirey, whom she had met in 1941. The wedding took place after a long engagement, as their earlier plans had been postponed because of World War II military service. Follett relocated to New York City to study with Hans Hofmann later that same year; the marriage ended in divorce in the early 1950s.

As a student at Hans Hofmann's school, Follett met and became romantically involved with Richard Stankiewicz, her future studio mate; that relationship ended in the late 1940s.

Follett maintained a decades-long, long-distance friendship with the Newfoundland artist Rae Perlin, who had lived for a short time in New York City. The two maintained a correspondence even after the end of Jean's art career and her return to Minnesota, writing letters through the 1960s and 1970s.

Jean Follett died on July 6, 1990, in Minneapolis, Minnesota. She was interred at Forest Lawn Memorial Park in Maplewood, Minnesota.

== Legacy ==
After her successes in the early 1960s, Follett fell into obscurity and is still a marginalized figure in the history of a scene in which she was briefly influential. Ivan Karp described her as a pioneer of "remarkable historic importance" whose adventurous work was perhaps too challenging to find a market at the time.

Her work is in the collections of the Museum of Modern Art, the American College of Greece, the Walker Art Center, the Whitney Museum of American Art and the Minnesota Historical Society.
