= Mr. Bellamy =

Painting by Roy Lichtenstein

- Artist: Roy Lichtenstein
- Year: 1961
- Movement: Pop art
- Dimensions: 143.5 cm × 108 cm (56.5 in × 42.5 in)
- Location: Modern Art Museum of Fort Worth; Fort Worth

Mr. Bellamy is a 1961 pop art painting by Roy Lichtenstein in his comic book style of using Ben-Day dots and a text balloon. The work is regarded as one of the better examples of Lichtenstein's sense of humor. The work is held in the collection at the Modern Art Museum of Fort Worth.

== Background ==
In 1961, Lichtenstein had developed the technique of emulating the mechanized production techniques, while simultaneously depicting the subjects of pop culture. This extended his pop art to a second dimension. He did so by developing a technique that took Ben-Day dots from small comic book panels and magazine pages to the grand scale of his oversized paintings.

Lichtenstein was a trained United States Army pilot, draftsman and artist as well as a World War II (WWII) veteran who never saw active combat. His list of aeronautical themed works is extensive. Mr. Bellamy depicts an air force soldier, according to some sources. However, other sources claim that the subject is a military officer of unknown branch of service. Created in Lichtenstein's breakthrough year, Mr. Bellamy represents an art world inside joke, which was succeeded the following year by Masterpiece, a satirical statement on his own career. In the work, Lichtenstein presents a wholesome male protagonist heading to an important meeting with a "Mr. Bellamy", who shared a name with one of Lichtenstein's important art world contacts, Richard "Dick" Bellamy, Green Gallery art dealer and director, who was known for presenting new work by unknown artists who had never been shown before. The text balloon says "I am supposed to report to a Mr. Bellamy. I wonder what he's like."

In November 1961, Lichtenstein sent Mr. Bellamy to Leo Castelli for sale.

== Critical response ==
The work represents Lichtenstein's "gentle, professorial humor" and his penchant for "corny themes, colors, and postures." Apart from enlarging its size, Lichtenstein presented a "mere copy, lacking artistic originality and creativity" in this work. This subject matter sourced from comic books was regarded as "the lowest commercial and intellectual kind" because of public sentiment on the heels of 1950s United States Senate investigations of connections between comics and juvenile delinquency.

== See also ==
- 1961 in art
