= Blue II =

Blue II or Blue 2 may refer to:

- Beneteau Blue II, a French catamaran design
- Blue II, a solar car made by Blue Sky Solar Racing in 1999
- Blue II, a 1961 oil painting by Joan Miró as part of Triptych Bleu I, II, III
- Blue II, a brand of disposable razors from Gillette
- Butler Blue II, a dog, mascot of Butler University 2004–2013
- Brilliant blue FCF, a food colorant also known as CI Food Blue 2
- Indigo carmine, a food colorant also known as FD&C Blue 2
