= Christopher Fitzgerald =

Christopher Fitzgerald may refer to:

- Christopher Fitzgerald (artist) (born 1977), American transmedia artist
- Christopher Fitzgerald (actor) (born 1972), American actor and performer
