= Huysman Gallery =

- Location in Los Angeles metropolitan area
- Established: December 1960
- Dissolved: Summer 1961
- Location: 740 N. La Cienega Blvd. Los Angeles, California
- Coordinates: 34.0848°N 118.3761°W
- Type: Art gallery
- Founder: Henry Hopkins

The Huysman Gallery was an art gallery in Los Angeles, California that operated from December 1960 to summer 1961. (Note: Most sources say the gallery was founded in 1960. However, Henry Hopkins once wrote that the gallery was founded in 1961.) It was located at 740 North La Cienega Boulevard, across the street from the noted Ferus Gallery. Curator Henry Hopkins, who founded the gallery, named it after the French decadent novelist Joris-Karl Huysmans. The gallery showcased the works of several young artists who later had great success, including Joe Goode, Ed Ruscha, and Larry Bell.

== War Babies exhibition ==
The gallery's most famous exhibition, War Babies, ran from May 29, 1961 to June 17, 1961. It showed the work of Goode, Bell, Ed Bereal, and Ron Miyashiro, all of whom were born in the late 1930s and experienced World War II in their early childhood. According to Hopkins, "the exhibition title was selected by Goode to establish a birth point in time and to indicate a sense of post-war internationalism." War Babies was one of the earliest racially integrated exhibitions and "was a daring challenge to the prevailing norms and mores of postwar America and its underlying racial stereotypes and identity politics." The participating artists played off the work of the nearby Ferus artists. Goode contributed thickly painted images of stars along with a cardboard box nailed to the gallery wall, Miyashiro contributed paintings suggestive of sinister eroticism, Bereal contributed leather pouches that stank of oil, and Bell contributed a "saddle painting". The mix of styles present in the exhibition was indicative of the fluidity of the Los Angeles art scene in the early 1960s.

The exhibition's poster, created by Jerry McMillan and Joe Goode, ultimately attracted more attention than the exhibition itself. It depicted the four participating artists seated at a table covered with an American flag as a tablecloth. Each of the artists was posed with a prop playing off an ethnic or religious stereotype: Bell (Jewish) held a bagel, Bereal (African American) held a watermelon, Miyashiro (Japanese American) held chopsticks, and Goode (Catholic) held a mackerel. Liberals and conservatives alike criticized the poster; the John Birch Society denounced the gallery for flag desecration. Following the controversy surrounding War Babies, the gallery's backers—a group of three lawyers—withdrew their support for the gallery. The gallery closed in summer 1961, soon after the close of the War Babies exhibition.
