= Electric Cord =

Painting by Roy Lichtenstein

- Artist: Roy Lichtenstein
- Year: 1961
- Movement: Pop art
- Dimensions: 71.1 cm (28.0 in) × 46.8 cm (18.4 in)

Electric Cord is a 1961 pop art painting by Roy Lichtenstein.

In October 2012, the painting was returned to the widow of Leo Castelli after it had gone missing 42 years prior. Castelli had purchased the painting in the 1960s for $750. In 2012, it was estimated to be worth $4 million.

== See also ==
- 1961 in art
