= Roto Broil =

Painting by Roy Lichtenstein

- Artist: Roy Lichtenstein
- Year: 1961
- Movement: Pop art
- Dimensions: 174 cm × 174 cm (68.5 in × 68.5 in)
- Location: Tehran Museum of Contemporary Art

Roto Broil is a 1961 pop art painting done in oil and graphite on canvas by Roy Lichtenstein. It was one of the consumer goods paintings made in the early 1960s that "made a splash, sold well and immediately polarized the critics."

== History ==
The subject of Roto Broil comes from a packaging carton. When Lichtenstein had his first solo show at The Leo Castelli Gallery in February 1962, it sold out before opening. Roto Broil was one of the works that Lichtenstein exhibited at that show. The work was acquired at Sotheby's, New York on October 21, 1976 for US$75,000.

== Details ==
Roto Broil is part of a 1961 trilogy of common commercial goods (along with Electric Cord and Turkey) that are considered his first "full-fledged images". They are reduce the narrative and highlight the "purely representational and explanatory value". This begins a period in which he presents bright objects in space for perusal. It was among the pop works that "...shocked viewers with their confrontational banality..."

Drawn from advertising, Roto Broil represents Lichtenstein's talent for depicting his source material in "unified, powerful and coherent formal structures" without his audience losing its connection to the source, while physically and powerfully expressing the key elements of his art — "colour, line, form, composition and so on." According to Modern Art: Impressionism to Post-Modernism,

the appliance itself, placed symmetrically against a uniform field of red, is treated in terms of bold simplified masses of black and white. Particularly striking is the rendering of the drainage holes in the frying-pan as black discs which take on a life of their own in the same way as they would in a completely abstract painting…The symmetry of the composition is calculatedly broken by the black lines (paradoxically indicating highlights) on the right side of the appliance and by the protruding handle of the pan on the same side.

Roto Broil presents its subject in its entirety with no distracting objects, but with no supporting planar surface. Thus, "It occupies the picture-plane emblematically, centralized and head-on." The "frontal and centralized presentation"'s directness lacked the sophistication to market the images of household goods for advertising but was considered daring artistically. The featured item was produced by Leon Klinghoffers company.

== See also ==
- 1961 in art
