= Sidney Tillim =

American painter

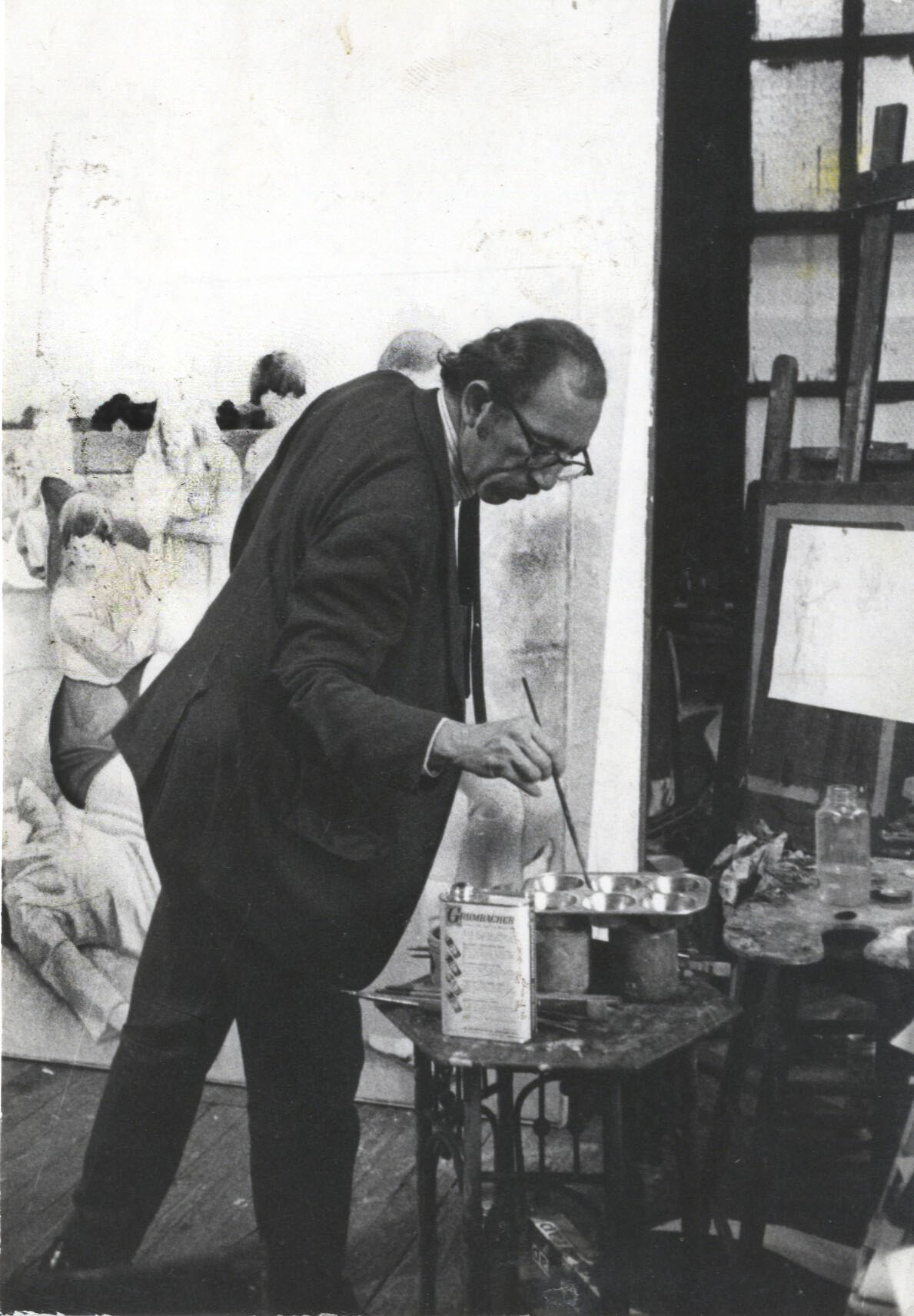
- Sidney Tillim, with Lamentation, 1970
- Born: June 16, 1925; New York City, New York
- Died: August 16, 2001 (aged 76); New York City, New York
- Education: Syracuse University
- Notable work: History paintings
- Movement: Figurative Art, Abstract Art
- Spouse: Diane Radycki Tillim
- Awards: Guggenheim Fellowship (painting), National Endowment for the Arts Grant, Pollock-Krasner Foundation Grant
- Website: Tillim Archive (http://www.dianearthistory.com/tillim-archive.html)

Sidney Tillim (June 16, 1925 – August 16, 2001) was an American artist and art critic, known for his maverick painting and independent point of view on modern art in post-war America. Best remembered for his revival of history painting in the 1970s, Tillim alternated between the figurative and the abstract throughout his career. Likewise, although he wrote on a wide range of topics for Artforum and Arts Magazine, he is most identified with supporting representational art when few did.

== Early life and education ==
Born in Brooklyn, New York, in 1925, Tillim grew up in Norfolk, Virginia, where, as a young teenager, he twice won the Tidewater Marbles Championship (1938, 1939). During the summers of 1946 and 1947, he covered Piedmont League baseball for the Norfolk Ledger-Dispatch, which also published his baseball drawings. (He claimed the cartoonists Milton Caniff and Willard Mullin as early influences.) Tillim went to Syracuse University to study journalism, only to switch to fine arts after a year. He earned a BFA in painting and illustration, magna cum laude, in 1950. In college he became interested in representational and abstract artists: Ben Shahn, Paul Klee, Wassily Kandinsky, the Cubists, and Piet Mondrian (especially in Mondrian's grids).

After graduation, Tillim headed to California where he took a series of jobs as he painted, wrote poetry, and acted. In Monterey in 1952 he had his first solo show (abstractions) and published a chapbook of poetry, about which the Beat Generation poet Lawrence Ferlinghetti wrote: "Here is a small collection of a painter's poetry.... He is not afraid to use strong language—if he sees dung, he names it. If his body is on fire, he says so. This is promising."

In 1953 Tillim returned to New York, where he would establish his career.

== Painting ==
Tillim had over twenty solo exhibitions and took part in many group shows throughout his career, from 22 Realists at the Whitney Museum of American Art in 1970 and the 1972 Whitney Annual to the big 1992 Slow Art: Painting in New York Now at MoMA PS1, and more. In 2002, a year after he died, Bennington College held a major retrospective exhibition, Sidney Tillim: A Life in Pictures (92 paintings, plus drawings and graphics).

Tillim's first solo show in New York took place in 1960 (geometric abstractions and representational art). It was not until the mid-1960s that he began large narrative paintings of personal, historical, and current events, among them The Death of Malcolm X, 1965 (unfinished); Champion, 1966 ("It’s me," Tillim said of the knuckles-down marble shooter, "conceiving we are the heroes of our own existence."); A Dream of Being, 1969 ("A kind of history painting...of the psychological reality of our time....[It is] about the secular experience and the 'hero' of that experience—secular man."); Lamentation (for Kate Houskeeper), 1970 (a breakthrough for him, Tillim would say later, in producing a narrative with conviction); Count Zinzendorf Spared by the Indians, 1972 ("I am using an earlier 'race' conflict to comment on the present one."); John Adams Accepts the Retainer to Defend the British Soldiers Accused in the Boston Massacre, 1974 (inspired by campus uprisings following the Kent State shootings); and The Capture of Patty Hearst, 1978.

In the 1960s and 1970s Tillim was represented by the avant-garde art dealer Richard Bellamy and by the Robert Schoelkopf Gallery, a showcase for contemporary figurative art. During these years his important narrative and representational paintings were acquired for the Hirshhorn Museum and Sculpture Garden, Washington, D.C.; Mumok, Vienna (Museum moderner Kunst Stiftung Ludwig Wien); the James A. Michener collection at the University of Texas; and the Weatherspoon Art Museum, University of North Carolina Greensboro. The Art Gallery of Alberta acquired a suite of thirty-one drawings for Eden Retold (a series of paintings which Tillim based on the poem by Karl Shapiro, "Adam and Eve"). Another drawing for this series—The Song, 1970—is held in the collection of the Museum of Modern Art.

By the time figurative art became of interest in the art world, however, Tillim, once at the forefront of the trend, had returned to hard-edge abstraction. "The idea was just to paint pictures, not to make art.... [Bugs Bunny Meets the Sublime, Fair Shake, Jackhammer] are the climax of the first period (note the sizes of the pictures).... I intended a kind of humor though, even in the abstract, to deflate pretension. To make art is pretentious."

Tillim began the transition away from "straight" figurative art in 1979 by way of a Cubo-Expressionist style, as in An American Tragedy (the novelist Norman Mailer stabbing his wife at a party). His narrative work in this short-lived style elicited some of the best reviews he would receive; while his totally abstract work would attract no attention for years. (In some quarters of the figurative revival, this embrace of abstraction would earn him life-long enmity.) As a consequence, in the mid-1980s when there were no commercial showings of this work, Tillim was challenged multiple times by the Internal Revenue Service on his claim to the profession "artist" (vs "teacher/ critic," with "artist" relegated to the category of hobby). Tillim prevailed in every audit.

Tillim's representational art had developed in the socially and politically unstable 1960s and 1970s; while his experiments in abstract art occurred at the time conservatism took hold in the eighties and nineties. It was in 1987 that he accidentally kicked over a can of paint in his studio and proceeded to soak up the spill off the floor with a roll of paper towels. The saturated toweling inspired him to imprint the sheets directly onto the canvas. He had stumbled upon a process that made concrete his ideas about reproduction, repetition, fabrication, and postmodernist art. The imprints are large and colorful, energetic and elegant—qualities that had been held in check by the labor of history painting (which could take months and in one instance, Tillim admitted, took years).

In 1992 Tillim started rubbing opaquing film (Korectype) on paper, scraping the film with his fingernails, brushes, scissors, etc. "Korectype appeals to me as a medium because it is both mechanical and manual at once. With it one makes a mark that is personal and impersonal—surprising and finished, a unique copy in fact."

Then in 1993, feeling he had taken these experiments as far as he could, Tillim resumed painting with brushes. The brushworks are large abstract compositions, loose grids of shapes of dripping color that, as intimated in the title Approaching Majesty, Accepting Shame, are simultaneously "magnificent" and "disenchanted." This new work took Tillim away from issues of perception and mechanical reproduction, inherent in the imprints, and brought him back to "painting about painting."

In his late period Tillim returned to narrative art, with images from popular culture—viz., movies, television, current events. These include American Beauty, David Cone's No-Hitter, Modern Crime, or The Death of Irene Silverman (by Sante Kimes), The Women (the rapper Foxy Brown and the model Kate Moss), and others.

What unites all his work is the postmodern combination of a deep affinity for ordinary American culture and colors with the traditions of art. These could range from the stiff elegance and frozen detachment of the Italian Primitives whom Tillim admired—Fra Angelico, Piero della Francesca, Andrea Mantegna, Giovanni Bellini—to the struggle and ambition of Cézanne. "Banality represented under the proper art historical, stylistic conditions is the only credible source of art beauty in late twentieth-century art," avowed Tillim. "If there's not an element of the banal, of the ordinary, even the 'kitschy,' it's not for me."

Tillim's last exhibition was eight 'banal,' 'ordinary,' 'even kitschy,' contemporary history paintings. The show, Sidney Tillim Recent Paintings, took place in 2001, four months before the artist died, making it perforce—much as is the painting Johnny Guitar, or To Stay or To Go—his "poignant moment of leave taking."

In painting Tillim was awarded a Guggenheim Fellowship, National Endowment for the Arts Grant, Pollock-Krasner Foundation Grant, Yaddo Fellowship, and Ingram Merrill Foundation for the Arts Grant. In Summer 1992 he was a Resident Artist at the Skowhegan School of Painting and Sculpture, Maine.

== Art criticism ==
Tillim's studio practice informed his critical thinking. "He had the most individual turn of mind of anyone I knew in the world of art," wrote Philip Leider, the founding editor of Artforum. Tillim, one of Leider's early East-Coast hires, was a contributing editor from 1965 to 1970. He wrote nineteen articles for the influential magazine, including "The Figure and the Figurative in Abstract Expressionism" (1965); "Philip Pearlstein and the New Philistinism" (1966); "Gothic Parallels: Watercolor and Luminism in American Art" (1967); "Earthworks and the New Picturesque" (1968); "A Variety of Realisms" (1969).

Before moving to Artforum, Tillim had been a prodigious reviewer and contributing editor at Arts Digest/ Arts/ Arts Magazine, where Hilton Kramer was editor. From 1958 to 1965 Tillim wrote as many as fifty exhibition reviews a month. Regardless, like the minimalist sculptor Donald Judd, who was his colleague at Arts, Tillim began to sense that criticism and the practice of painting were incompatible. After leaving Artforum, Tillim stopped writing for commercial publication; when he resumed, fourteen years later, he free-lanced as an occasional contributor to American Craft, Art in America, Artforum, and Arts. His last published piece, the photography exhibition review "William Henry Fox Talbot at Hans P. Kraus, Jr.," appeared in 2000 in Art in America.

Before his death, Tilllim was gathering material for a book on the art critic Clement Greenberg, whom he considered the most important influence on his own criticism. (Tillim had portrayed Greenberg, a long-term friend, in 1969 in the painting Who Among Us Really Knows?) Tillim also assembled two groups of essays for publication. One, "Art after Ideology: Selected Writings, 1959-89," anthologizes thirty years of magazine writing; the other, "The Return of Bad Art: Art in the Age of Mechanical Representation," concerns photography and its impact on and assimilation by fine art in the postmodern twentieth century.

== Teaching ==
Tillim taught art history, painting, and art criticism at Bennington College for nearly three decades, from 1966 to 1994. At Bennington he became friends with the artist Jules Olitski and the writer Phillip Lopate. In spring 1973 Tillim was appointed visiting Charles A. Dana Professor of Fine Arts at Colgate University, where he debuted The Reception of President-Elect Washington by the Women of Trenton, April 21, 1789 (destroyed 1996)—a painting prompted by the disgraced presidency of Richard Nixon.

== Book collecting ==
In addition to being an artist and writer, Tillim was an avid book collector. He compiled one collection on 19th-century American art (acquired by Arizona State University) and another on photomechanical reproduction c.1840-1960 (800 objects, acquired by the San Francisco Museum of Modern Art). On the latter subject, he organized two exhibitions (with catalogues), one contemporary and one historical: 1) Photography Reproduction Production/ The Work of Art in the Age of Mechanical Representation: Richard Artschwager, Ellen Brooks, Joseph Nechvatal, Mark Tansey, Andy Warhol (Bennington College, 1992); and 2) with the photographer David A. Hanson, Photographs in Ink (Fairleigh Dickinson University, 1996). An historical survey of photomechanical printing, from early systems up to three/four-color letterpress halftone, such an exhibition was rare at the time. All 120 items on display were culled from the personal collections of the two curators.

== Personal ==
Tillim was the second of three children born to Norman and Anna Tillim (née Cohen), and was raised in an Orthodox Jewish family. The Tillims kept a tavern in Norfolk, Va. His father was a merchant marine, often away from home. (The childhood memory of his father's return after a six-month absence occasioned Tillim's 1979 painting The Return of My Father from Alaska.) His parents divorced in 1941 and, until he went into the Army, the teenage Tillim stayed with relatives in Brooklyn or in a boarding house with his errant father. Much like him, Tillim was a "dude" when it came to dress. (In the photograph at the head of this article, he can be seen in his studio painting in a suit and tie.)

Tillim attended Maury High School, Norfolk, Virginia, 1939–43; served in the US Army in Europe in World War II, 1943-46 (Purple Heart); then attended Syracuse University on the GI Bill, 1946–50. In high school Tillim took art courses and wrote and drew sports cartoons for the high school weekly. In the army he wrote and illustrated The History of Company A, 252nd Engineer Combat Battalion, 1946. In college he was the sports editor for the campus monthly magazine, Syracusan, and won the Freshman Prize in painting (for figurative work). Tillim would often apply his sportswriter's visual sensibility to his artist's narrative talent. (Figurative paintings like Champion and David Cone's No Hitter are overt examples, while the titles of abstract works, such as the baseball-themed Carucci's Dominion and Ducks on the Pond, provide more allusive examples.)

In 1956 Tillim married Muriel Schochen (aka Muriel Sharon, 1919–96), the founding director of the Children's Theater at the 92nd Street YM-YWHA, New York. In 1998 he married the art historian Diane Radycki (born 1946), the author of Paula Modersohn-Becker: The First Modern Woman Artist (Yale University Press, 2013).

Tillim died in Manhattan on August 16, 2001.

== Sidney Tillim Archive ==
In January 2018 the Sidney Tillim Archive was donated to the New York Public Library. The extensive archive holds over fifty years of journals, drawings, and papers.

Tillim's journals offer a rare look into the New York art world in the second half of the twentieth century by an insider with an "oppositional mind"—a painter of not only figuration but also abstraction; a critic who wrote for important art magazines, cutting-edge and established; an artist who taught criticism at a college outstanding for its fine-arts curriculum; and an amateur collector who put together a museum-quality collection of specimens of 19th-century photomechanical reproduction.

Tillim's drawings and sketchbooks cover his entire oeuvre, and include preparatory studies for the major paintings. There is also an atlas-size, limited edition portfolio, New York (16 prints by 16 artists), published in 1991 by Juni-Verlag, Germany, with graphic work by Tillim, Rudy Burckhardt, Joseph Nechvatal, Philip Pocock, Mierle Laderman Ukeles, Hannah Wilke, et al. In addition, the Archive holds works on paper by other artists, among them the children's book illustrator Marcia Brown, the muralist and printmaker Richard Haas, the minimalist Sol LeWitt (early figurative work), the contemporary artist Tom Sachs, the "Lost Generation" artist Henry Strater, and the sculptor Isaac Witkin; as well as a miscellany by various Bennington College art faculty (Kenneth Noland, June Leaf, et al.), from doodles drawn during faculty meetings and random sketches made of one another, to a life-size plaster head and face mask of Tillim.

Tillim's papers consist of a voluminous correspondence (to and from 1,000 writers); records that document his practice as an artist, writer, teacher, and curator; inventories of book collections; as well as biographical records, his annotated personal library, recordings, memorabilia, and ephemera (including several scarce posters: How Modern is The Museum of Modern Art? 1940, American Abstract Artists; The Intrasubjectives, 1949, Samuel M. Kootz Gallery; and The Store, 1961, Claes Oldenburg).

== Bibliography ==
22 Realists [exhibition catalogue]. Curator James K. Monte. Whitney Museum of American Art, 1970, p. 55. Illus. Furniture War.

1972 Annual Exhibition of Painting. Contemporary American Painting [exhibition catalogue]. Whitney Museum of American Art, 1972, p. 61. Illus. Count Zinzendorf Spared by the Indians.

Barnitz, Jacqueline. Exhibition review (Sidney Tillim at Robert Schoelkopf Gallery). Arts Magazine, March 1965, p. 57. Illus. Work Jacket on Tripod [aka Work Jacket on Easel].

Burton, Scott. Exhibition review (Sidney Tillim at Noah Goldowsky Gallery). Art News, Summer 1969, p. 73. Illus. A Dream of Being.

Coleman, A. D. "Photographs in Ink, A Survey" (at Fairleigh Dickinson University). Photography in New York International, November/ December 1996, p. 42.

Davis, Douglas. "Return of the Real" (22 Realists at Whitney Museum). Newsweek, February 23, 1970, p. 105. Illus. The Death of a Girl [aka Lamentation (for Kate Houskeeper)].

Drawings by Sidney Tillim [exhibition catalogue]. Intro. Lelde Muehlenbachs. The Edmonton Art Gallery, Alberta, 1976. Illus. ten figure drawings, including eight studies for Eden Retold.

Genocchio, Benjamin. Exhibition review (Sidney Tillim at Suffolk Community College). New York Times (Long Island), February 11, 2007, Arts and Entertainment, p. 14. Illus. Television, Fast Shuffle.

Hagen, Charles. "A Show of 5 Artists Who Use the Look of Photo Reproduction" (at Bennington College). New York Times, May 18, 1992, pp. C13-14.

Johnson, Ken. Exhibition review (Sidney Tillim at Trans Hudson). New York Times, May 4, 2001, p. E33.

Judd, Donald. Exhibition review (Sidney Tillim at Cober). Arts, November 1960, p. 56. Illus. Fifth Painting. Reprinted in Donald Judd Complete Writings 1959-1975. Halifax and New York: The Press of the Nova Scotia College of Art and Design and New York University Press, 1975.

Looking Critically: 21 Years of Artforum Magazine. Preface Amy Baker Sandback. Ann Arbor, Mich: UMI Research Press, 1984, p. 337. Illus. A Dream of Being.

Mattick, Paul. "Sidney Tillim at Usdan Gallery, Bennington College." Art in America, May 2003, pp. 152–53. Illus. Diderot in Hawaii.

"Neuer Realismus: Auf dem Rückweg" (22 Realists at Whitney Museum). Der Spiegel, August 10, 1970, p. 111. Illus. Tod eines Mädchens [Death of a Girl, aka Lamentation (for Kate Houskeeper)].

Newman, Amy. Challenging Art: Artforum 1962-1974. New York: Soho Press, 2000.

Perl, Jed, and Deborah Rosenthal. Exhibition review (Sidney Tillim at Meredith Long Contemporary). Arts Magazine, January 1980, p. 8. Illus. Murder Hollywood Style.

Photographs in Ink [exhibition catalogue]. Curators David A. Hanson and Sidney Tillim. Essay Sidney Tillim. Fairleigh Dickinson University, 1996.

Realism Now [exhibition catalogue]. Essay Linda Nochlin. Vassar College, Poughkeepsie, NY, 1968, p. 43. Illus. Sink and Burlap Bag.

Rose, Barbara, Michael Fried, Max Kozloff, and Sidney Tillim. Art Criticism in the Sixties. A Symposium of the Poses Institute of Fine Arts. Brandeis University, Waltham, Mass., May 7, 1966. New York: October House, 1967.

Schwabsky, Barry. On Sidney Tillim, et al. In: "Studio View." The New Art Examiner, February 1994, p. 29. Illus. Approaching Majesty, Accepting Shame.

Sidney Tillim [exhibition catalogue]. Essay Terry Fenton. The Edmonton Art Gallery, Alberta, 1973. Illus. seven b&w reproductions (including one of The Reception of President-Elect Washington by the Women of Trenton, April 21, 1789, 1973, oil on canvas, 80" x 64").

Sidney Tillim, Imprints & Brushworks 1989-1993 [exhibition catalogue]. Essay Uli Bohnen. Galerie Vorsetzen, Hamburg, 1993. Illus. nine b&w reproductions, sixteen color plates.

Sidney Tillim New Paintings & Drawings [exhibition catalogue]. Essay Barry Schwabsky. Trans Hudson Gallery, New York, 1997. Illus. Colors, Making the Cut, Remembering Representation, Yes and Noir.

Sidney Tillim Recent Paintings [exhibition catalogue]. Trans Hudson Gallery, New York, 2001. Illus. eight color plates.

Siegel, Katy. "Sidney Tillim: Critical Realist." Artforum, September 2003, pp. 208–11. Illus. Diderot in Hawaii, John Adams Accepts the Retainer to Defend the British Soldiers Accused in the Boston Massacre.

Tillim, Sidney. "Bugs Bunny Meets the Sublime" [lecture], Summer 1992. In: Resident Artists Lecture Series. Skowhegan School of Painting and Sculpture, Maine. The Skowhegan audio archive is on deposit at the libraries of The Archives of American Art, Museum of Modern Art, Art Institute of Chicago, Getty Research Institute, among others. A CD of his lecture is held in the Tillim Archive.

Tillim, Sidney. "Criticism and Culture, or Greenberg’s Doubt." Art in America, May 1987, pp. 122–27ff.

Tillim, Sidney. Essay. In: Photography Reproduction Production/ The Work of Art in the Age of Mechanical Representation: Richard Artschwager, Ellen Brooks, Joseph Nechvatal, Mark Tansey, Andy Warhol [exhibition catalogue]. Curator Sidney Tillim. Bennington College, 1992.

Tillim, Sidney. Essay. In: Realism & Metaphor [exhibition catalogue]. Intro. Margaret A. Miller. Univ. of South Florida, Tampa, 1980. Illus. An American Tragedy, The Return of My Father from Alaska.

Tillim, Sidney. "The Ideal and the Literal Sublime: Reflections on Painting and Photography in America." Artforum, May 1976, pp. 58–61.

Tillim, Sidney. "My New Sofa" [personal essay]. Art in America, October 2001, pp. 43–45. Illus. David Cone’s No-Hitter, untitled abstraction [misidentified as Bugs Bunny Meets the Sublime], The Departure of the Prince of Wales (watercolor).

Tillim, Sidney. "Notes of a New York Critic." In: New York: The Art World (Arts Yearbook 7). Ed. James R. Mellow. New York: The Art Digest, 1964, pp. 56–59.

Tillim, Sidney. "Notes on Narrative and History Painting." In: A New History Painting by Sidney Tillim: The Reception of President-Elect Washington by the Women of Trenton [exhibition catalogue]. The Picker Gallery, Colgate University, 1973. Illus. five b&w reproductions (including two drawings for The Reception...). Reprinted with revisions and different illustrations in Artforum, May 1977.

Tillim, Sidney. "On Reproducing a Photograph." In: Photographs in Ink [exhibition catalogue]. Curators David A. Hanson and Sidney Tillim. Fairleigh Dickinson University, 1996.

Wasserman, Emily. Exhibition review (Sidney Tillim at Noah Goldowsky Gallery). Artforum, Summer 1969, pp. 63–64. Illus. Who Among Us Really Knows?
