= Richard Bellamy (art dealer) =

American art dealer (1927–1998)

- Born: December 3, 1927; Cincinnati, Ohio, US
- Died: March 29, 1998 (aged 70)
- Occupation: Art dealer

Richard Hu Bellamy (December 3, 1927 – March 29, 1998), was an American art dealer, known as Dick Bellamy.

Dick Bellamy was born in Cincinnati in 1927, the son of a doctor who met his future wife at medical school. He ran New York's Green Gallery, from 1960 until 1965 an art gallery at 15 West 57th Street in Manhattan. He then ran the Noah Goldowsky Gallery on Upper Madison Avenue for a few years. Bellamy attended the University of Ohio in Cincinnati for one semester. In 1949 he visited Provincetown, Massachusetts, and its summer art colony. He moved to New York in the early 1950s, eventually working as director of the Hansa Gallery, a cooperative gallery that included members Allan Kaprow, George Segal, Richard Stankiewicz, Jean Follett, Robert Whitman and Jan Müller. Under the pseudonym Mooney Peebles he appeared in the 1959 short film Pull My Daisy written by Jack Kerouac and directed by Robert Frank and Alfred Leslie.
