= Ron Miyashiro =

American painter

Ronald Yoshiaki Miyashiro (born 1937) is an American artist who works in painting, jewelry making, and assemblage art. Miyashiro, a Japanese American born in Honolulu, Hawaii, first came to prominence in 1961 while still a student at Chouinard Art Institute in Los Angeles, when he appeared on the controversial poster for "War Babies," an influential exhibition at Henry Hopkins' Huysman Gallery in Los Angeles, along with his friends and contemporaries Larry Bell, Ed Bereal, and Joe Goode. Miyashiro later moved from Los Angeles to New York City where he continues to make work in multiple media. His early work has enjoyed a resurgence in recent years, and has been included in a number of high-profile museum exhibitions devoted to art from the 1960s.

== Education ==
Miyashiro moved to Los Angeles, California in 1957, at the age of 19 to attend Chouinard, at the instigation of a cousin. Without a portfolio or any prior training in visual art, Miyashiro was forced to take private lessons in order to create a portfolio so that he could get into Chouinard's program. While there, he studied painting with Robert Irwin, who introduced Miyashiro to the use of inexpensive house paints and strategies of assemblage. Irwin's influence led directly to Miyashiro's major works of the early 1960s, wall-mounted small-scale assemblages consisting of found objects and dark, thick paint. Richards Ruben, who was a major exponent of abstract expressionism in southern California, was also teaching at the time at Chouinard and was another important influence. The postwar period at Chouinard was a high point for the institution, which became a seedbed for abstract expressionist practice in California, a key context for Miyashiro's work in the early 1960s.

== "War Babies" ==
In 1961, Miyashiro was one of four artists who appeared in "War Babies," an exhibition curated by Henry Hopkins at the Huysman Gallery in Los Angeles. The exhibition's poster, which featured Miyashiro, Bell, Goode and Bereal eating foods stereotypically associated with their respective ethnicities, attracted controversy and criticism from sources as diverse as the John Birch Society on the right (for the poster's alleged desecration of the American flag) and from voices on the left decrying its use of stereotypes. Miyashiro's work at the time consisted of paintings and elegant, small-scale charcoal drawings that were, according to Henry Hopkins, "very black and very dark drawings of vaginal shapes, very rich oily, charcoal things. There would be a kind of slit in the middle."

Miyashiro later moved to New York where, facing financial difficulties, he returned to jewelry making as a way of making ends meet, while continuing to work as an artist in other mediums.

In 2022, Marian Goodman Gallery featured historical work from the exhibition in their Paris bookstore, Librairie Marian Goodman, in the exhibition War Babies and the Studs.

== Exhibitions ==
Miyashiro's work has enjoyed a resurgence in recent years, and has been included in several high-profile group exhibitions devoted to art in Los Angeles in the 1960s. In 1988, he was featured in Lost and Found in California : Four Decades of Assemblage Art, published in conjunction with a series of exhibitions organized by James Corcoran Gallery in Santa Monica.

In 2010, Miyashiro participated in "circa 1962," a two-person show at Cardwell Jimmerson gallery in Culver City in 2010, alongside the work of Jim Eller.

In 2011, Miyashiro's work was included in the group exhibition "Now Dig This! Art in Black Los Angeles 1960-1980" at UCLA's Hammer Museum alongside works by Noah Purifoy, John Outterbridge, Melvin Edwards, Betye Saar, Charles White as well as other non-African American artists including Mark di Suvero, Sheila Levrant de Bretteville, Gordon Wagner and others.

== Death ==
Ron died December 8, 2016, at the age of 78.

=== External links ===
- first part of a four-part interview with Ron Miyashiro, 2011 on YouTube
- Miyashiro speaking about his work at The Getty Center in 2010
- A short biography of the artist for Pacific Standard Time at The Getty Center
- Joe Goode, Larry Bell, Ron Miyashiro, and Jerry McMillan speak about the exhibition War Babies, 2010–11
- Ron Miyashiro's Work Featured in Sandy Relief Fund Art Show
