= Carson Park =

Carson Park may refer to:

== Parks in the United States ==
- Carson Park (baseball stadium), Eau Claire, Wisconsin
- Carson Park (Eau Claire, Wisconsin)
- Johnny Carson Park, Burbank, California
- Kit Carson Park, Escondido, California
- Lang-Carson Park, Reynoldstown, Atlanta, Georgia
- A park in Indianapolis, Indiana

== Other uses ==
- Carson Park (baseball stadium), in Wisconsin
- A neighborhood in Long Beach, California; see Long Beach Fire Department

== See also ==
- Carson Parks (1936–2005), American songwriter
