= International Museum of Art & Science =

Coordinates: 26.2415°N 98.2336°W

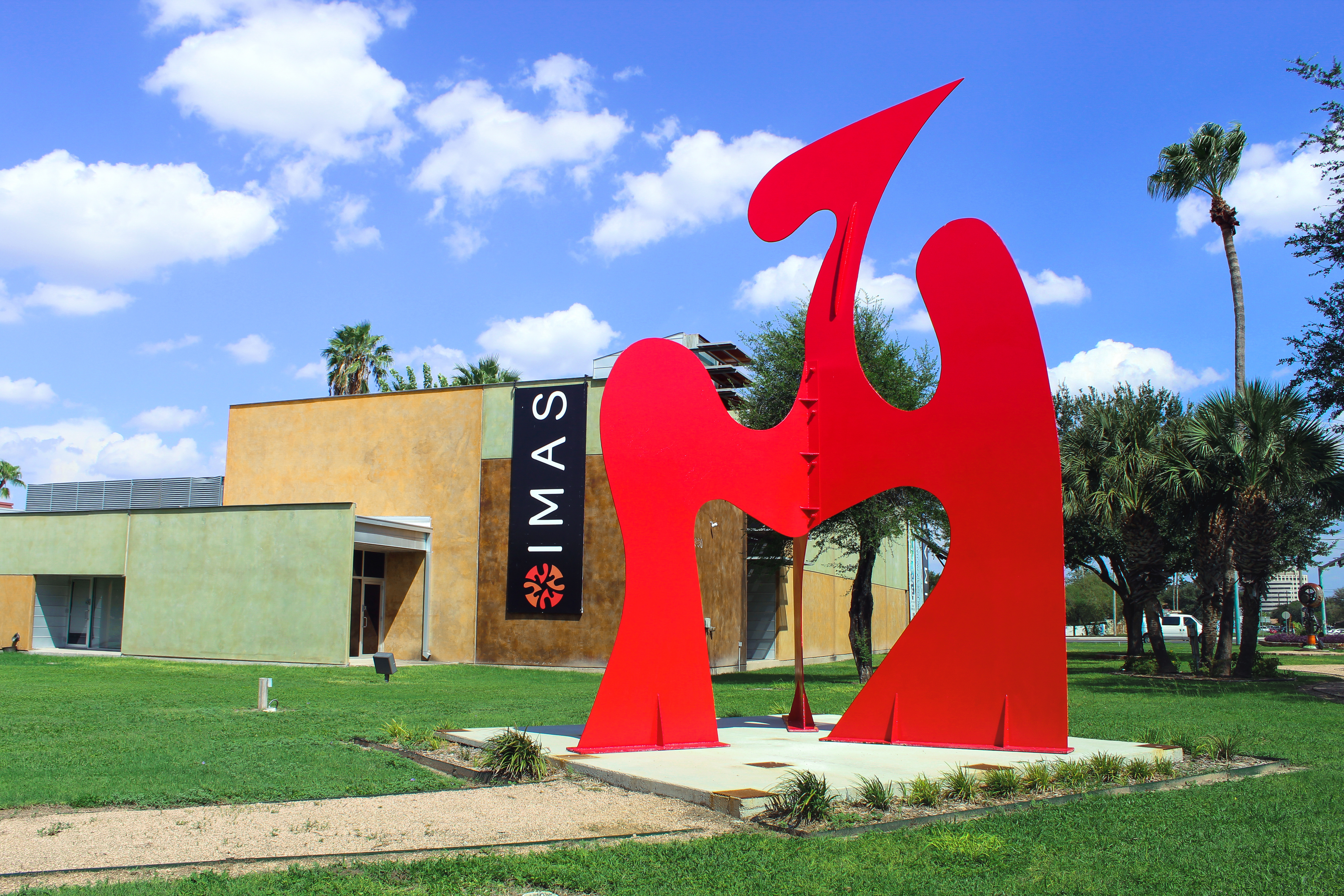
"Dactyl" by Stuart Kraft at the International Museum of Art & Science

The International Museum of Art & Science (IMAS) is a museum located in McAllen, Texas. It is dedicated to exhibiting Latin American art, as well as educating visitors about science. Its exhibits include antique stained glass, images from the Hubble Space Telescope, and the Discovery Pavilion, an educational children's exhibit. The museum also features a sculpture garden and a science playground.

The museum's art collections include European art from the 16th to 19th centuries, Japanese prints, Modern art and folk art.
