= Mackerel snapper =

Derogatory term for Catholics in America

Mackerel snapper was once a sectarian slur for Catholics, originating in the United States in the 1850s. It referred to the Catholic discipline of Friday abstinence from red meat and poultry, for which fish was substituted. That practice distinguished Catholics from other Christians, especially in North America, where Protestant churches prevailed and Catholics tended to be immigrants from Italy, Poland, and Ireland.

The term has been considered jocular since the mid-20th century and has fallen into disuse.

== Examples ==
One example of the term's use comes from a letter to University of Notre Dame's president Father Matthew Walsh, from an anonymous Klansman who was upset with the actions of Notre Dame students in breaking up a Klan rally in South Bend.

The term was also used by a character in the motion picture Heaven Knows, Mr. Allison, set in the South Pacific during 1944 (the screenplay compares the rituals and commitment of the Catholic Church and the United States Marine Corps). In the film, the non-Catholic U.S. Marine Corporal Allison (Robert Mitchum) refers to some fellow Marines as "mackerel snappers" while talking with a Catholic nun, then catches himself and quickly explains away his faux pas by stating that they were the "best Marines".

The term is also included in the novel The Sun Also Rises by Ernest Hemingway: "They thought we were snappers, all right," the man said. "It certainly shows you the power of the Catholic Church. It's a pity you boys ain't Catholics. You could get a meal, then, all right."

In the novel A Prayer for Owen Meany by John Irving, the title character uses it to describe Catholics during the anti-Catholic phase of his childhood and adolescence.

In the movie Needful Things Father Meehan, the Catholic priest, refers to himself as a Mackerel Snapper.

In Rowan & Martin's Laugh-In Season 2 Episode 25 at 37:16 (March 24, 1969), two nuns are in a restaurant. The waitress says, "Can I have your orders?" One of the nuns responds, "Two mackerels."

In Dalziel and Pascoe Series 12 Episode 2, Dalziel uses the term to refer to a pathologist who crosses himself.

The term is used in the TV series Barney Miller episode, "Possession", in which a suspect demands to be exorcised of his demons.

The term is used often on the Michael Knowles podcast on The Daily Wire.

== See also ==
- Anti-Catholicism
- Discrimination
- Papist
- Friday Fast
