= Trees of Mystery =

Park near Klamath, California

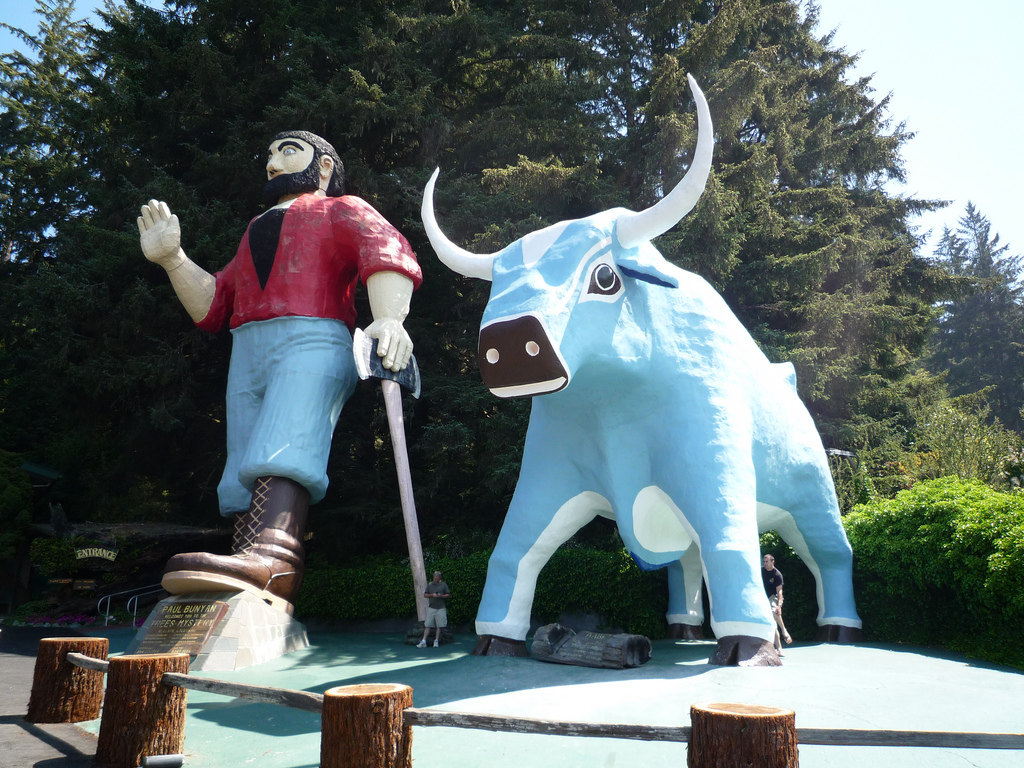
- Paul Bunyan and Babe the Blue Ox statues at Trees of Mystery
- Interactive map of Trees of Mystery
- Location: Klamath, California, USA
- Coordinates: 41°35′4.1″N 124°5′8.83″W
- Status: Operating
- Opened: 1946
- Website: Official website

Trees of Mystery is a park and tourist attraction along U.S. Route 101 (US 101) near the coastal town of Klamath, California. It features interpretive trails through Coastal Redwoods and a number of unusual tree formations, many of which can be seen from its Kingdom of Trees Trail. Its Trail of Tall Tales displays some 50 chainsaw sculptures and carvings illustrating stories of legendary logger Paul Bunyan and his crew.

Trees of Mystery is best known for its 49-foot (15 m) statue of Paul Bunyan and 35-foot (11 m) statue of Bunyan's companion Babe the Blue Ox, which are visible from US 101. Constructed largely of wooden beams, chicken wire and stucco, the current Babe was built in 1950 and the current Bunyan in 1961. The original Bunyan was built in 1946, but was destroyed by rain that winter. In late 2007, the half-ton, 9-foot-wide (2.7 m) head of Babe fell to the ground as the result of rain damage; it has since been replaced.

An early 1950 brochure referred to the attraction as "Unbelievable but True, World's Largest Group of Nature's Living Wonders".

== Attractions ==
=== The trees ===
Trees of Mystery highlights a selection of novel tree formations, including:

- The Cathedral Tree, consisting of nine trees growing in a semicircle out of one root structure, often used as a site for weddings
- The Brotherhood Tree, so named for its massive size of 19 feet in diameter and 297 feet in height. Since 2014, the official height is 246 feet. The top of the tree may have been struck by lightning, so its height may have decreased.
- The Candelabra Tree, formed by a fallen tree with younger trees sprouting from it
- The Elephant Tree, resembling an elephant's trunk, with multiple limbs branching from its base

Given the trees' ages and sizes, it is generally assumed that Trees of Mystery's creators discovered the formations in-place and decided to build an attraction around them. However, the attraction's history and kitschy style have given it archetypal status among West Coast tourist destinations.

=== Skytrail ===
In 2001, an aerial tramway was installed called the Skytrail. It takes guests on a 1/3-mile ride through the forest, allowing them to see parts of the attraction from a different point of view. It culminates at an observation deck where the Pacific Ocean is visible above the surrounding forest.

=== The End of the Trail Collection ===
The End of the Trail holds a large private collection of Native American art, crafts and tools.

== See also ==
- Paul Bunyan-themed tourist attractions
- Statues of Paul Bunyan
- List of Museums in the North Coast (California)
