= Ed Bereal =

American artist

- Born: 1937 (age 88–89)
- Education: Chouinard Art Institute

Ed Bereal (born 1937) is an American artist best known for his work in assemblage and for his participation in exhibitions and performances that addressed political issues and racial stereotypes from the 1960s onward. In 1961, his work was included in the controversial exhibition War Babies at the Huysman Gallery in Los Angeles, along with work by Larry Bell, Joe Goode, and Ron Miyashiro. In the 1960s he and other artists like Vija Celmins, Craig Kauffman, and Robert Irwin taught at the new campus of the University of California, Irvine in the Fine Arts department.

In 2022, Marian Goodman Gallery featured historical work from the 1961 exhibition in their Paris bookstore, Librairie Marian Goodman, in the exhibition War Babies and the Studs.

Bereal was a founding member of the 1960s radical street theater group Bodacious Buggerrilla. In 2012, the group was featured in the Getty Center's Performance and Public Art Festival as part of "Pacific Standard Time: Art in L.A., 1945-1980". This event was part of a series entitled "Talks about Acts," organized by Malik and Alexandro Segade.

== Education ==
- 1959-62 Chouinard Art Institute
- 1962-68 private studies with John Chamberlain
- Private studies with John Altoon and Peter Voulkos

== Recent exhibitions ==
- 2022 Librairie Marian Goodman, Paris
- 2004 Elizabeth Leach Gallery, Portland, OR
- 2006 Centre Georges Pompidou, Paris
- 2006 Roberts & Tilton, New York
- 2009 Moderna Museet, Stockholm
- 2016 Harmony Murphy Gallery, LA
- 2019 The Whatcom Museum, Bellingham, WA
