= Triptych Bleu I, II, III =

1961 painting series by Joan Miró

- Tríptico Azul I, II, III (Spanish)
- Artist: Joan Miró
- Year: 1961
- Medium: Oil on Canvas
- Movement: Abstractism
- Dimensions: 270 cm × 355 cm (110 in × 140 in)
- Location: Musée National d'Art Moderne, Paris

Triptych Bleu I, II, III is a triptych created in 1961. It is a set of three-part display abstract oil paintings by the Spanish modern artist Joan Miró. The paintings are named Bleu I, Bleu II, Bleu III (in English, Blue I, Blue II, Blue III) and are similar. All are large paintings of 355 cm x 270 cm each, and are currently owned by the Musée National d'Art Moderne in the Centre Pompidou in Paris.

== Background ==
As an up-and-coming artist in Paris during the 1920s, Miró was influenced heavily by Cubism and Art Nouveau, particularly the works of artists like Picasso. During this time he painted works similar to Bleu I, II and III such as Maternity (1924), Painting (1927), and Catalan Peasant with a Guitar (1924). Many of these works used the same spacious, blue field. Miró held a special significance with this colour; to him this blue was a symbol of a world of cosmic dreams, an unconscious state where his mind flowed clearly and without any sort of order. This blue was the colour of a surreal, ethereal night, a night that embodied the only place where dreams could exist in their rawest state, untouched and uncensored by conscious, rational thought.

== The painting ==
Miró completed the Triptych Bleu I, II, III on March 8, 1961, well into his artistic career. By this time he was an established artist with large exhibitions all over the world, and saw this triptych as a summary of his works up to this point. Shifts in style and technique are apparent over the course of his artistic career, ranging from busy landscapes and portraits at the beginning of his career to his famous abstract paintings of nearly empty space and stark, primary colors, the style in which Bleu II was created. Miró’s abstract paintings conveyed his dreams and subconscious, and he often spoke of painting freely without truly being in control; rather, letting the free-flowing thoughts and shifts of his mind move the brush across the canvas, a technique referred to as “psychic automatism”. Bleu II exemplifies his distinct style; the artist uses sparse, uniform brushstrokes all across the canvas, giving the enormous expanse of the painting an even more empty feeling, which is emphasized even further by the distinguishable dreamy blue of the background.

Bleu II is probably the painting in Miró’s portfolio that most definitively expresses his obsession with dreamscapes and vacant, infinite space. In 1958, during which he was working on the Bleu I, II, III triptych and similar abstract murals in Paris, he was quoted saying: “The spectacle of the sky overwhelms me. I’m overwhelmed when I see, in an immense sky, the crescent of the moon, or the sun. There, in my pictures, tiny forms in huge, empty spaces. Empty spaces, empty horizons, empty plains—everything which is bare has always greatly impressed me.” (Twentieth Century Artists on Art, 1958). Bleu I and Bleu III are nearly identical to Bleu II with exactly the same backgrounds of matching color and simple lines and shapes.

To animate the sparseness of Bleu II's canvas, Miró includes the dynamic red line on the left side of the painting, conveying a sharp shock in the calm blue surface. He also employs the series of bold, defined black dots radiating out from the red line in a horizontal flow to transmit the motion of the line through the whole expanse of the canvas. With these shapes, Miró creates an energetic, powerful piece, a bold work brought to life by the precise (but by intention very free) placement of geometric shapes and bright colors, allowing the viewer a glimpse into the unspoiled subconscious of the artist and truly embodying the unique style for which Miró is well known for today.
