= Richard Stankiewicz =

American sculptor (1922–1983)

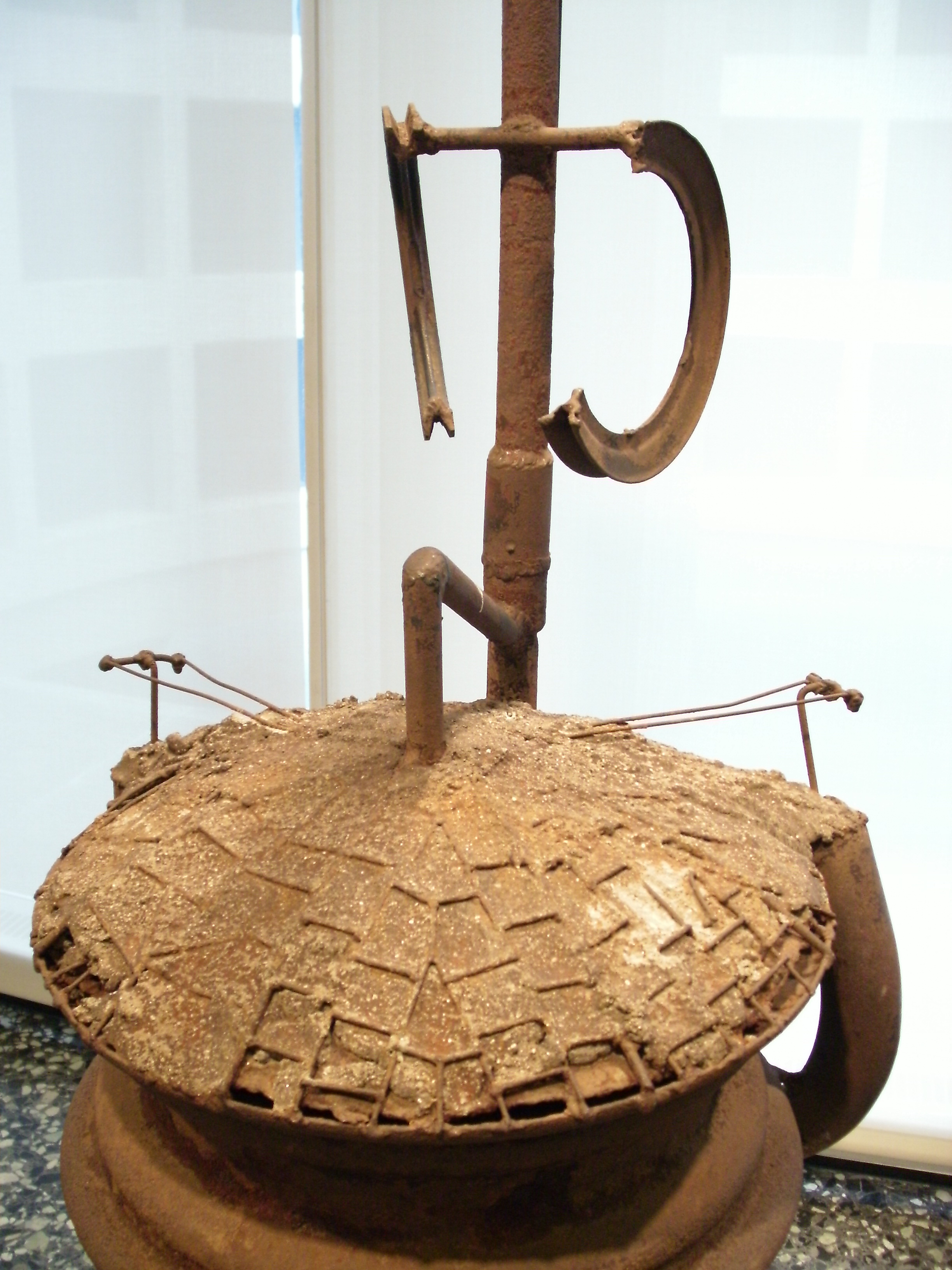
Detail of Figure; 1956; steel, iron, and concrete; in the collection of the Hirshhorn Museum and Sculpture Garden

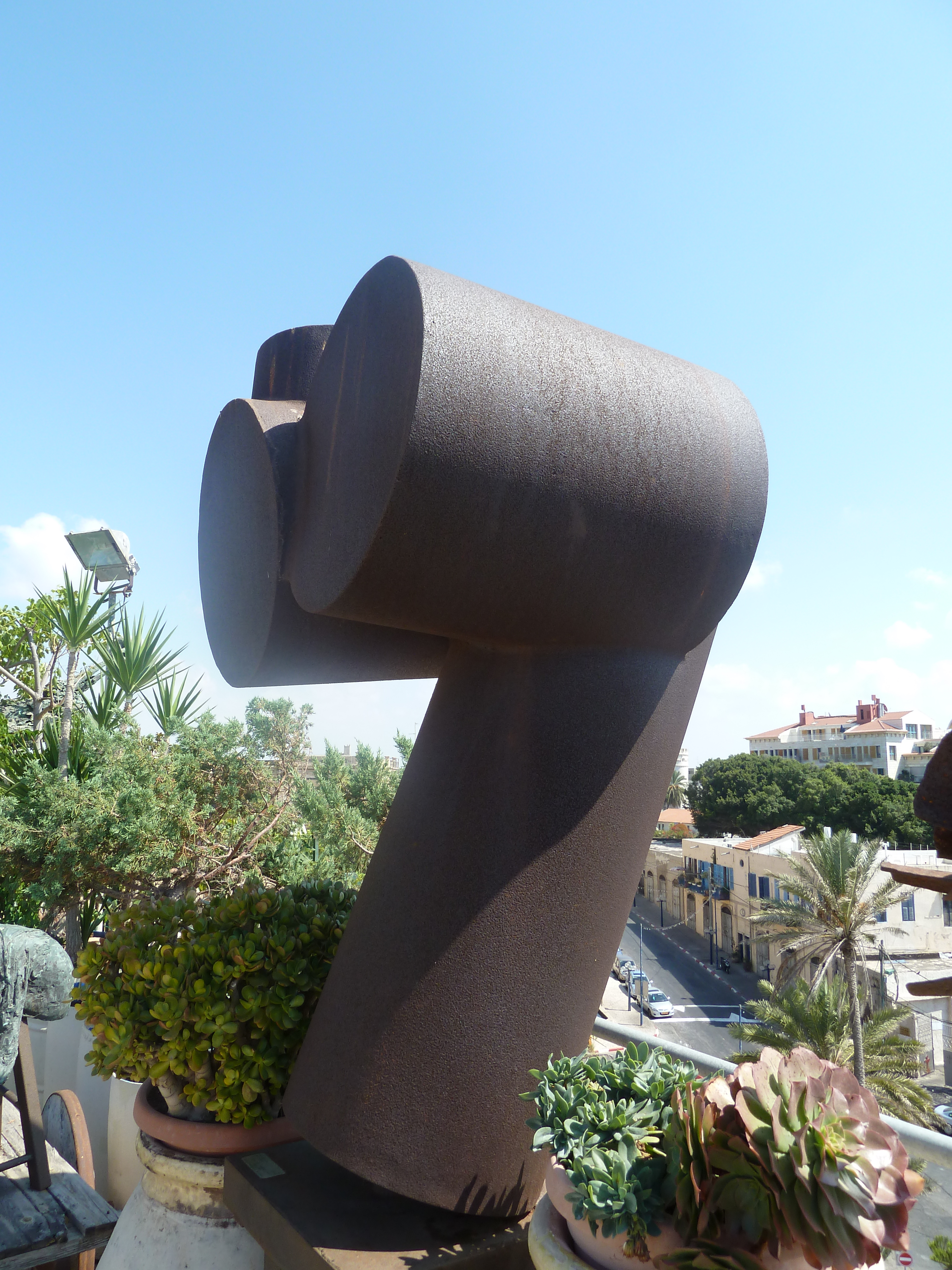
"Miracle in the Scrap Heap", displayed in the Ilana Goor Museum, Jaffa.

Richard Stankiewicz (1922–1983) was an American sculptor, known for his work in scrap metal.

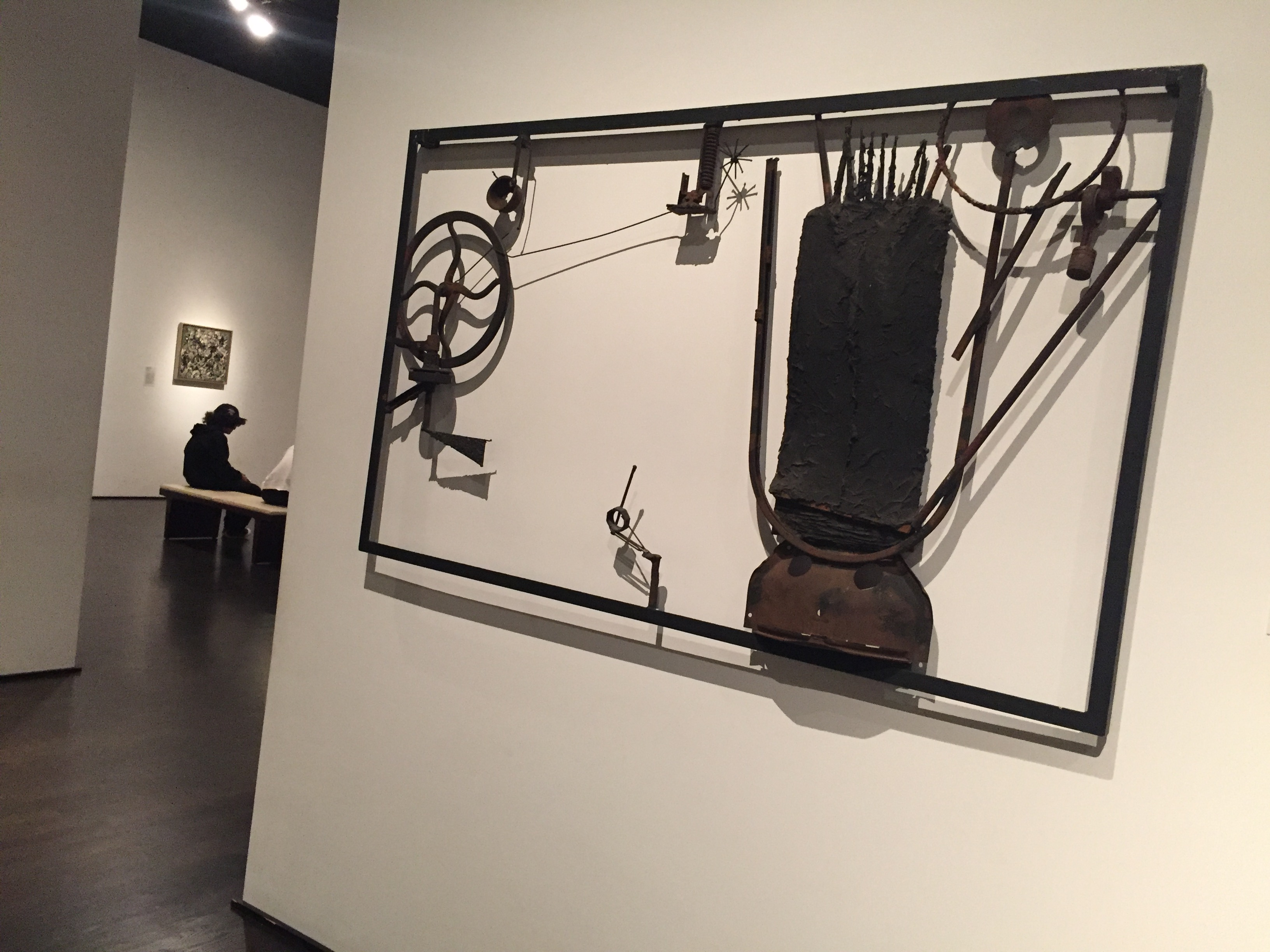
Untitled, 1956-1957, by Richard Stankiewicz.

Stankiewicz was born in Philadelphia, but spent his formative years in Detroit. He began painting and sculpting while in the United States Navy, in which he served from 1941 until 1947. Beginning in 1948 and continuing into the following year, he studied in New York City with Hans Hofmann; in 1950–51, in Paris, he studied with Fernand Léger and Ossip Zadkine. Upon his return to New York, Stankiewicz joined the cooperative Hansa Gallery; he exhibited there until the end of the 1950s, moving to the Stable Gallery in 1959. In 1962 he left the city for Huntington, Massachusetts. Stankiewicz continued to exhibit internationally until his death in 1983. Today his work may be seen in numerous museum collections, including those of the Hirshhorn Museum and Sculpture Garden, the Carnegie Museum of Art, the Smithsonian American Art Museum, the Cleveland Museum of Art, The Hyde Collection, and the Walker Art Center.
