= Klamath, California =

Unincorporated community in coastal northern California

Klamath, California Hoʼpʼew (Yurok)
- unincorporated community census-designated place
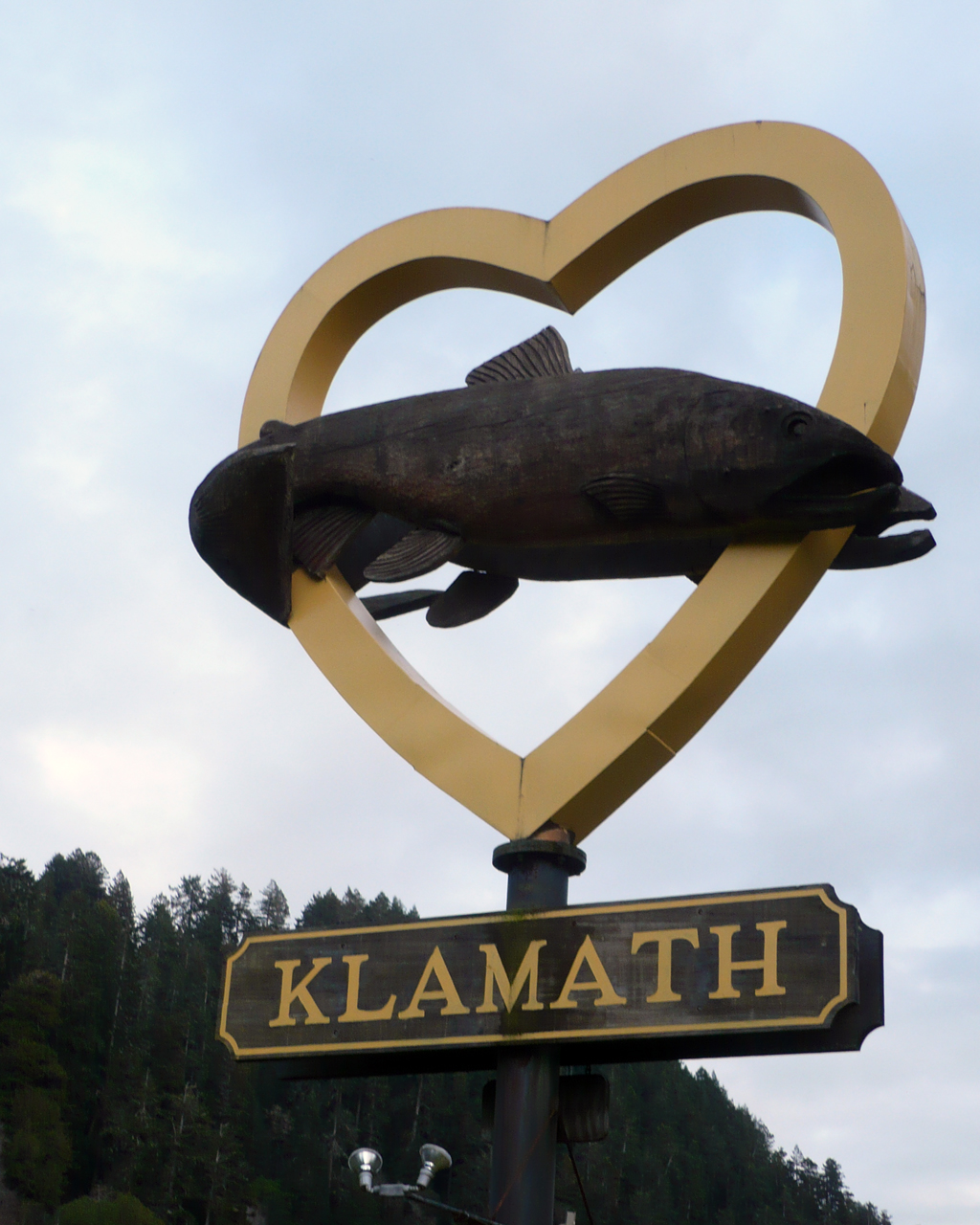
- A giant salmon in a heart sign at the entrance to the town of Klamath

- Location in Del Norte County and the state of California

- Location in the United States Location in California
- Coordinates: 41°31′35″N 124°02′18″W
- Country: United States
- State: California
- County: Del Norte

Area
  - Total: 17.217 sq mi (44.592 km^{2})
  - Land: 17.217 sq mi (44.592 km^{2})
  - Water: 0 sq mi (0 km^{2}) 0%
- Elevation: 30 ft (9 m)

Population (2020)
  - Total: 1,088
  - Density: 63.19/sq mi (24.40/km^{2})
- Time zone: UTC-8 (Pacific (PST))
  - Summer (DST): UTC-7 (PDT)
- ZIP code: 95548
- Area code(s): 707, 369
- FIPS code: 06-38702
- GNIS feature ID: 0277534

Klamath (Yurok: Hoʼpʼew; Tolowa: Taa-chit) is an unincorporated community in Del Norte County, California, United States, situated on US Route 101, inland from the mouth of the Klamath River. The population of Klamath is 1088 based on the 2020 US Census. For statistical purposes, the United States Census Bureau has defined Klamath as a census-designated place (CDP). Klamath is at an elevation of 30 feet (9.1 m). Klamath is located within the Yurok Indian Reservation.

The original town center was destroyed by the 1964 Flood. Streets and sidewalks of this original site, west of US 101 and the current site of the town's core, remain visible.

== Geography ==
According to the United States Census Bureau, the CDP has a total area of 17.2 square miles (45 km^{2}), all land.

=== Climate ===
The region experiences warm (but not hot) and dry summers, with no average monthly temperatures above 71.6 °F (22.0 °C). According to the Köppen Climate Classification system, Klamath has a warm-summer Mediterranean climate, abbreviated "Csb" on climate maps.

Climate data for Klamath
Month	Jan	Feb	Mar	Apr	May	Jun	Jul	Aug	Sep	Oct	Nov	Dec	Year
Record high °F (°C)	75 (24)	80 (27)	81 (27)	86 (30)	91 (33)	98 (37)	89 (32)	93 (34)	95 (35)	90 (32)	78 (26)	72 (22)	98 (37)
Mean daily maximum °F (°C)	54.4 (12.4)	56.3 (13.5)	56.7 (13.7)	58.5 (14.7)	61.8 (16.6)	64.8 (18.2)	66.3 (19.1)	66.7 (19.3)	67.2 (19.6)	64.2 (17.9)	58.6 (14.8)	54.6 (12.6)	60.8 (16.0)
Daily mean °F (°C)	46.4 (8.0)	47.9 (8.8)	48.4 (9.1)	50.2 (10.1)	53.6 (12.0)	57.7 (14.3)	58.9 (14.9)	59.4 (15.2)	58.5 (14.7)	55.1 (12.8)	50.3 (10.2)	46.6 (8.1)	52.7 (11.5)
Mean daily minimum °F (°C)	38.4 (3.6)	39.6 (4.2)	40.1 (4.5)	42 (6)	45.4 (7.4)	49.1 (9.5)	51.6 (10.9)	52.2 (11.2)	49.8 (9.9)	46 (8)	42.1 (5.6)	38.7 (3.7)	44.6 (7.0)
Record low °F (°C)	18 (−8)	19 (−7)	24 (−4)	27 (−3)	24 (−4)	33 (1)	34 (1)	36 (2)	24 (−4)	28 (−2)	22 (−6)	16 (−9)	16 (−9)
Average precipitation inches (mm)	13.86 (352)	10.79 (274)	10.51 (267)	5.72 (145)	3.63 (92)	1.42 (36)	0.32 (8.1)	0.73 (19)	1.71 (43)	5.66 (144)	11.68 (297)	14.05 (357)	80.09 (2,034)
Average snowfall inches (cm)	0.4 (1.0)	0.4 (1.0)	0.1 (0.25)	0 (0)	0 (0)	0 (0)	0 (0)	0 (0)	0 (0)	0 (0)	0 (0)	0.1 (0.25)	1.1 (2.8)
Average precipitation days	17	15	16	12	8	5	2	2	4	8	15	17	121

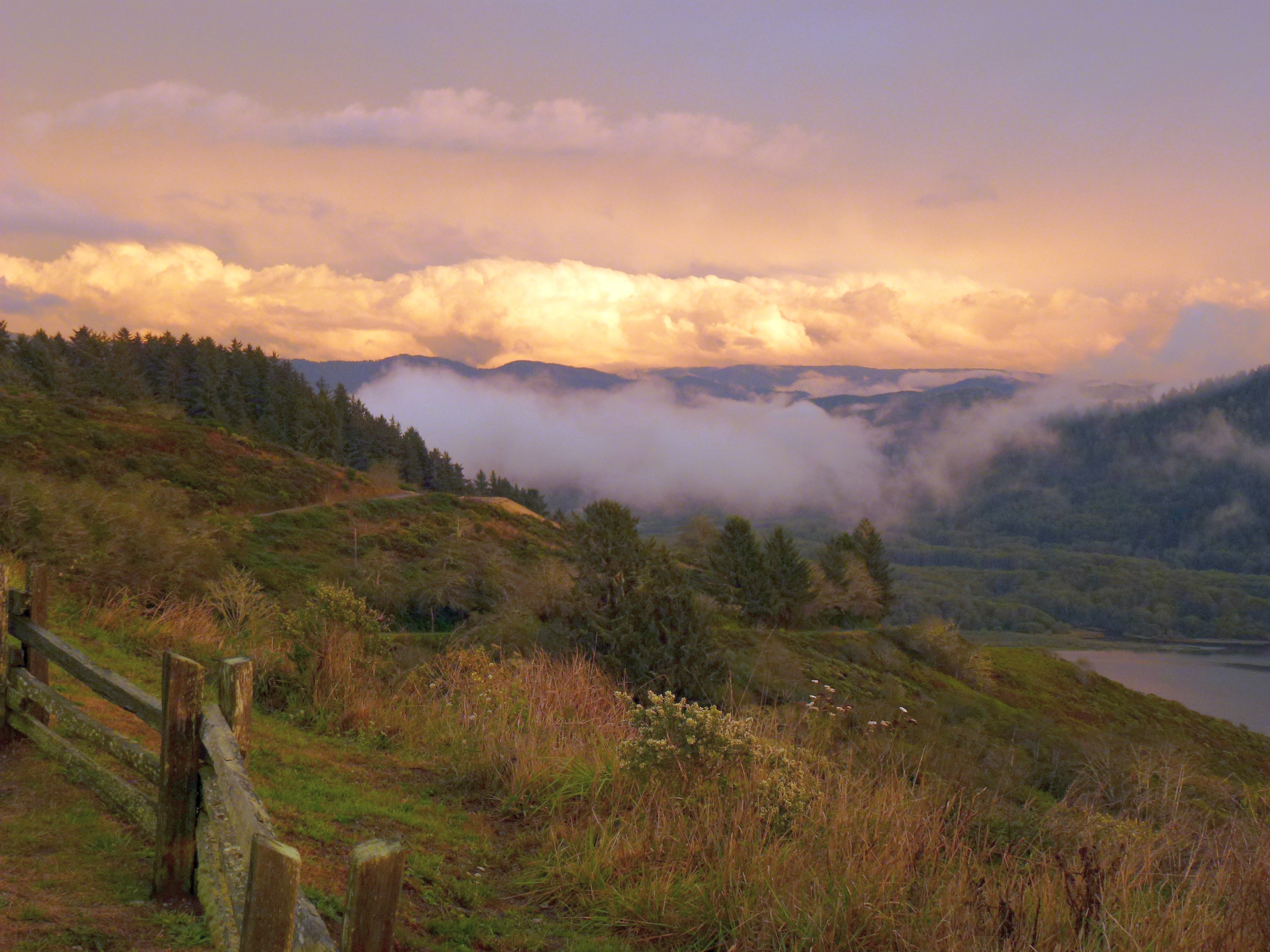
Klamath River Overlook near Klamath

== Demographics ==
Historical population
Census	Pop.	Note	%±
1990	827		—
2000	651		−21.3%
2010	779		19.7%
2020	1,088		39.7%
U.S. Decennial Census; 1990 2000 2010

Klamath first appeared as a census designated place in the 1990 U.S. census.

=== Racial and ethnic composition ===
Klamath CDP, California – Racial and ethnic composition Note: the US Census treats Hispanic/Latino as an ethnic category. This table excludes Latinos from the racial categories and assigns them to a separate category. Hispanics/Latinos may be of any race.
Race / Ethnicity (NH = Non-Hispanic)	Pop 2000	Pop 2010	Pop 2020	% 2000	% 2010	% 2020
White alone (NH)	368	354	426	56.53%	45.44%	39.15%
Black or African American alone (NH)	0	1	3	0.00%	0.13%	0.28%
Native American or Alaska Native alone (NH)	214	275	429	32.87%	35.30%	39.43%
Asian alone (NH)	5	2	2	0.77%	0.26%	0.18%
Native Hawaiian or Pacific Islander alone (NH)	0	0	3	0.00%	0.00%	0.28%
Other race alone (NH)	1	0	2	0.15%	0.00%	0.18%
Mixed race or Multiracial (NH)	27	57	142	4.15%	7.32%	13.05%
Hispanic or Latino (any race)	36	90	81	5.53%	11.55%	7.44%
Total	651	779	1,088	100.00%	100.00%	100.00%

=== 2020 census ===
As of the 2020 census, Klamath had a population of 1,088 and a population density of 63.2 inhabitants per square mile (24.4/km^{2}).

The age distribution was 256 people (23.5%) under the age of 18, 65 people (6.0%) aged 18 to 24, 248 people (22.8%) aged 25 to 44, 273 people (25.1%) aged 45 to 64, and 246 people (22.6%) who were 65 years of age or older. The median age was 42.4 years. For every 100 females, there were 98.9 males, and for every 100 females age 18 and over there were 92.1 males age 18 and over.

The census reported that 99.7% of the population lived in households and 3 people (0.3%) were institutionalized. In addition, 0.0% of residents lived in urban areas, while 100.0% lived in rural areas.

There were 425 households, out of which 113 (26.6%) had children under the age of 18 living in them, 128 (30.1%) were married-couple households, 49 (11.5%) were cohabiting couple households, 137 (32.2%) had a female householder with no partner present, and 111 (26.1%) had a male householder with no partner present. Of all households, 160 (37.6%) were one person households, and 72 (16.9%) had someone living alone who was 65 or older. The average household size was 2.55. There were 231 families (54.4% of all households).

There were 560 housing units at an average density of 32.5 units per square mile (12.5 units/km^{2}), of which 425 (75.9%) were occupied and 135 (24.1%) were vacant. Of the occupied units, 278 (65.4%) were owner-occupied and 147 (34.6%) were occupied by renters. The homeowner vacancy rate was 1.7% and the rental vacancy rate was 14.7%.

=== 2010 census ===
At the 2010 census Klamath had a population of 779. The population density was 62.1 inhabitants per square mile (24.0/km^{2}). The racial makeup of Klamath was 379 (48.7%) White, 1 (0.1%) African American, 325 (41.7%) Native American, 3 (0.4%) Asian, 0 (0.0%) Pacific Islander, 5 (0.6%) from other races, and 66 (8.5%) from two or more races. Hispanic or Latino of any race were 90 people (11.6%).

The census reported that 775 people (99.5% of the population) lived in households, 4 (0.5%) lived in non-institutionalized group quarters, and no one was institutionalized.

There were 307 households, 83 (27.0%) had children under the age of 18 living in them, 107 (34.9%) were opposite-sex married couples living together, 37 (12.1%) had a female householder with no husband present, 30 (9.8%) had a male householder with no wife present. There were 38 (12.4%) unmarried opposite-sex partnerships, and 5 (1.6%) same-sex married couples or partnerships. 94 households (30.6%) were one person and 35 (11.4%) had someone living alone who was 65 or older. The average household size was 2.52. There were 174 families (56.7% of households); the average family size was 3.20.

The age distribution was 183 people (23.5%) under the age of 18, 53 people (6.8%) aged 18 to 24, 168 people (21.6%) aged 25 to 44, 231 people (29.7%) aged 45 to 64, and 144 people (18.5%) who were 65 or older. The median age was 43.1 years. For every 100 females, there were 107.2 males. For every 100 females age 18 and over, there were 109.9 males.

There were 406 housing units at an average density of 32.4 units per square mile (12.5 units/km^{2}), of which 307 were occupied, 173 (56.4%) by the owners and 134 (43.6%) by renters. The homeowner vacancy rate was 3.9%; the rental vacancy rate was 8.8%. 398 people (51.1% of the population) lived in owner-occupied housing units and 377 people (48.4%) lived in rental housing units.

== Economy ==
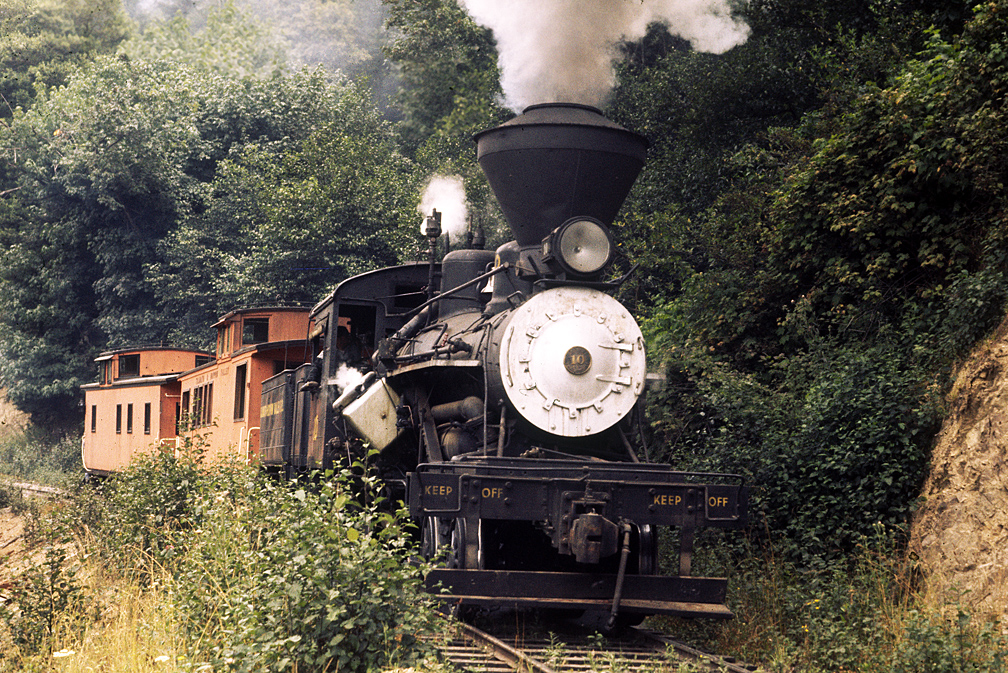
KHV No. 10, a 3-truck Heisler locomotive on the Klamath & Hoppow Valley Railroad, 1972

Salmon fishing was a major component of the local economy. As of 2023, fish stocks were in steep decline due to political feuds with upstream agribusiness water users in the Klamath Falls area.

== Arts and culture ==
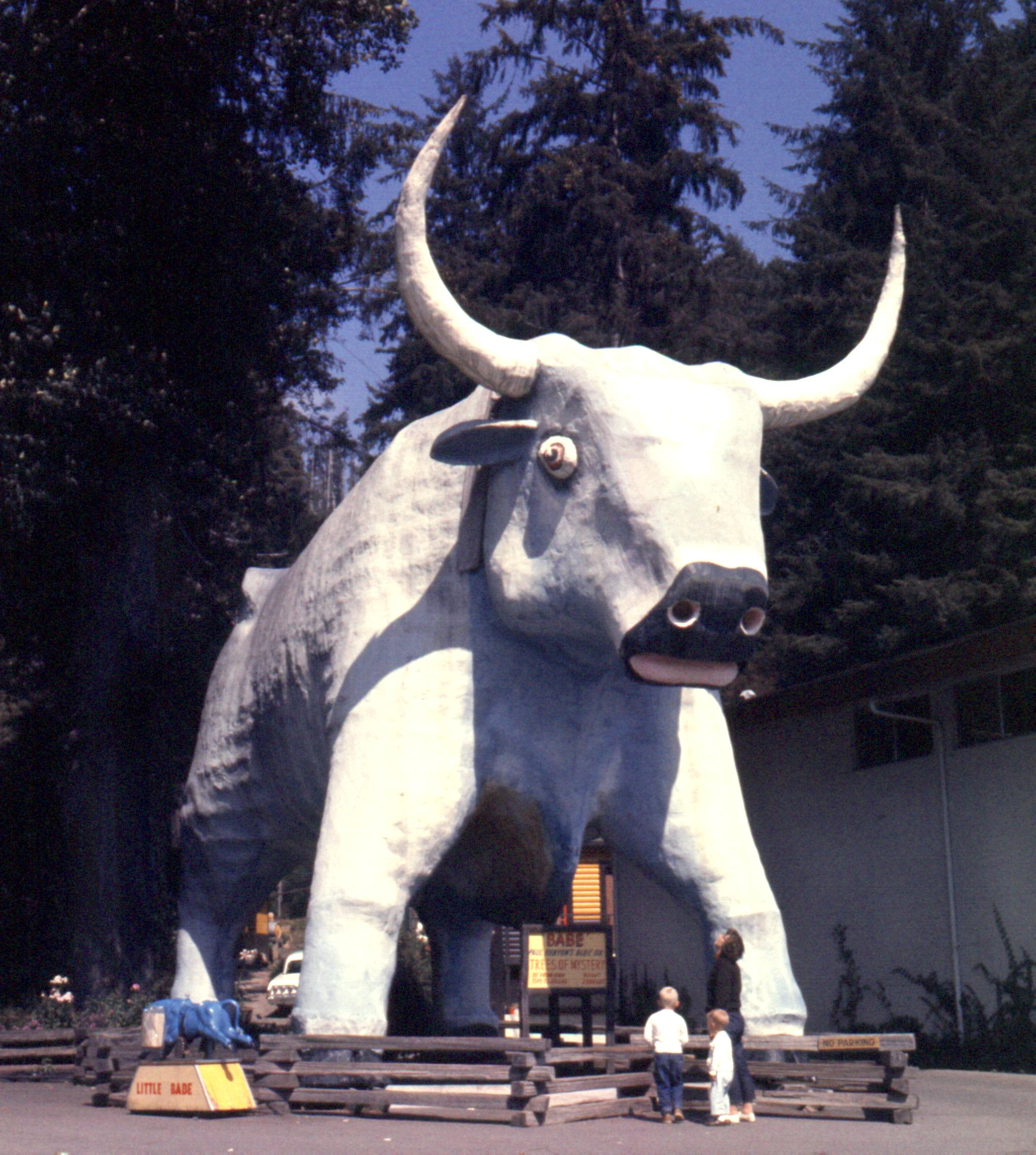
Babe the Blue Ox and Trees of Mystery in Klamath

Klamath has a 35-foot-tall (10 m) statue of Babe the Blue Ox, the legendary sidekick of Paul Bunyan, the famous mythical lumberjack, at Trees of Mystery.

Klamath is home to one of three California redwood trees that can be driven through.

== Government ==
In the state legislature, Klamath is in the 2nd senatorial district, represented by Democrat Mike McGuire, and the 2nd Assembly district, represented by Democrat Chris Rogers.

Federally, Klamath is in California's 2nd congressional district, represented by Democrat Jared Huffman.

== See also ==
- Trees of Mystery
