= Modern art =

Artistic period (1860s–1970s)

Modern art

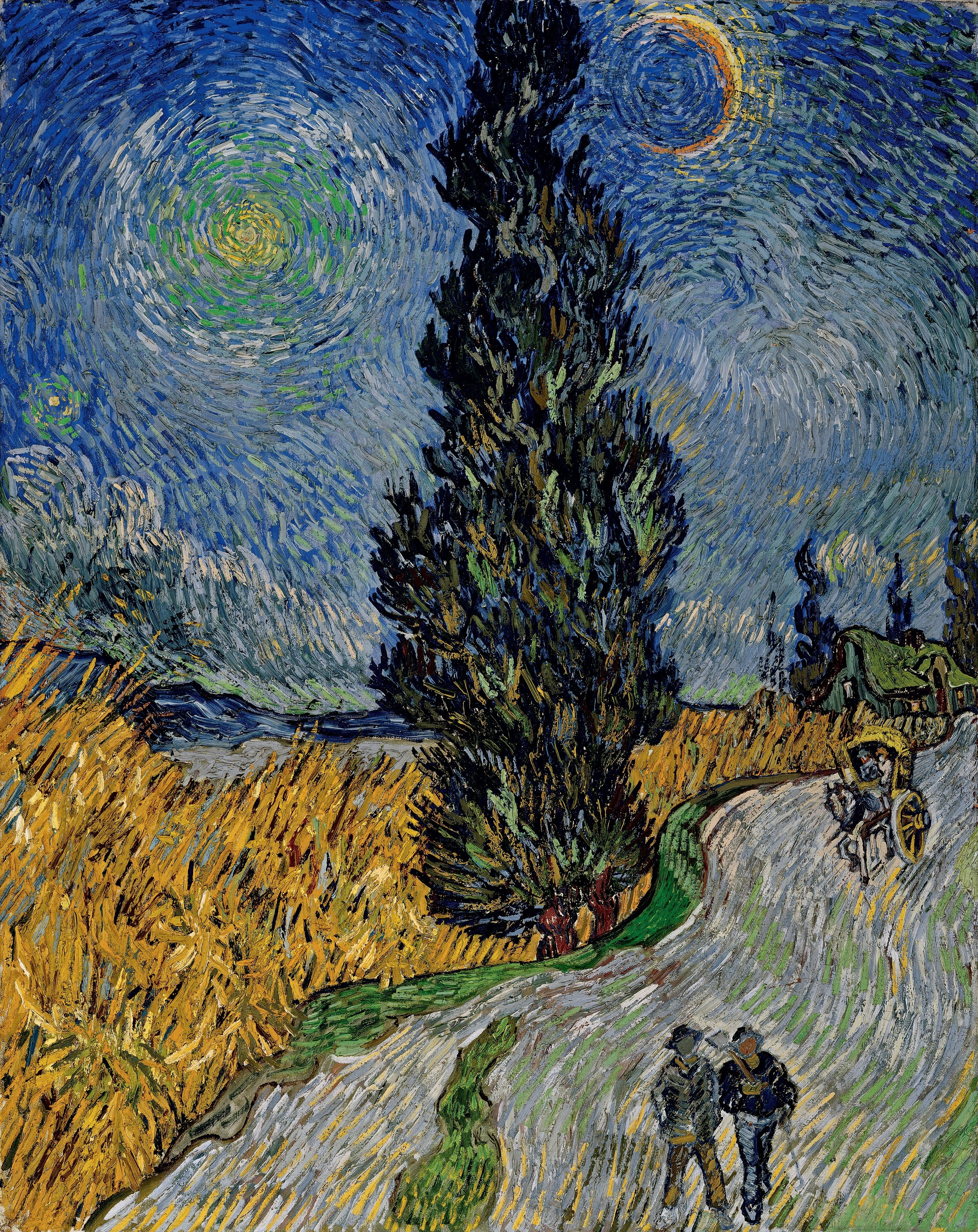
Vincent van Gogh, Country Road in Provence by Night, May 1890, Kröller-Müller Museum

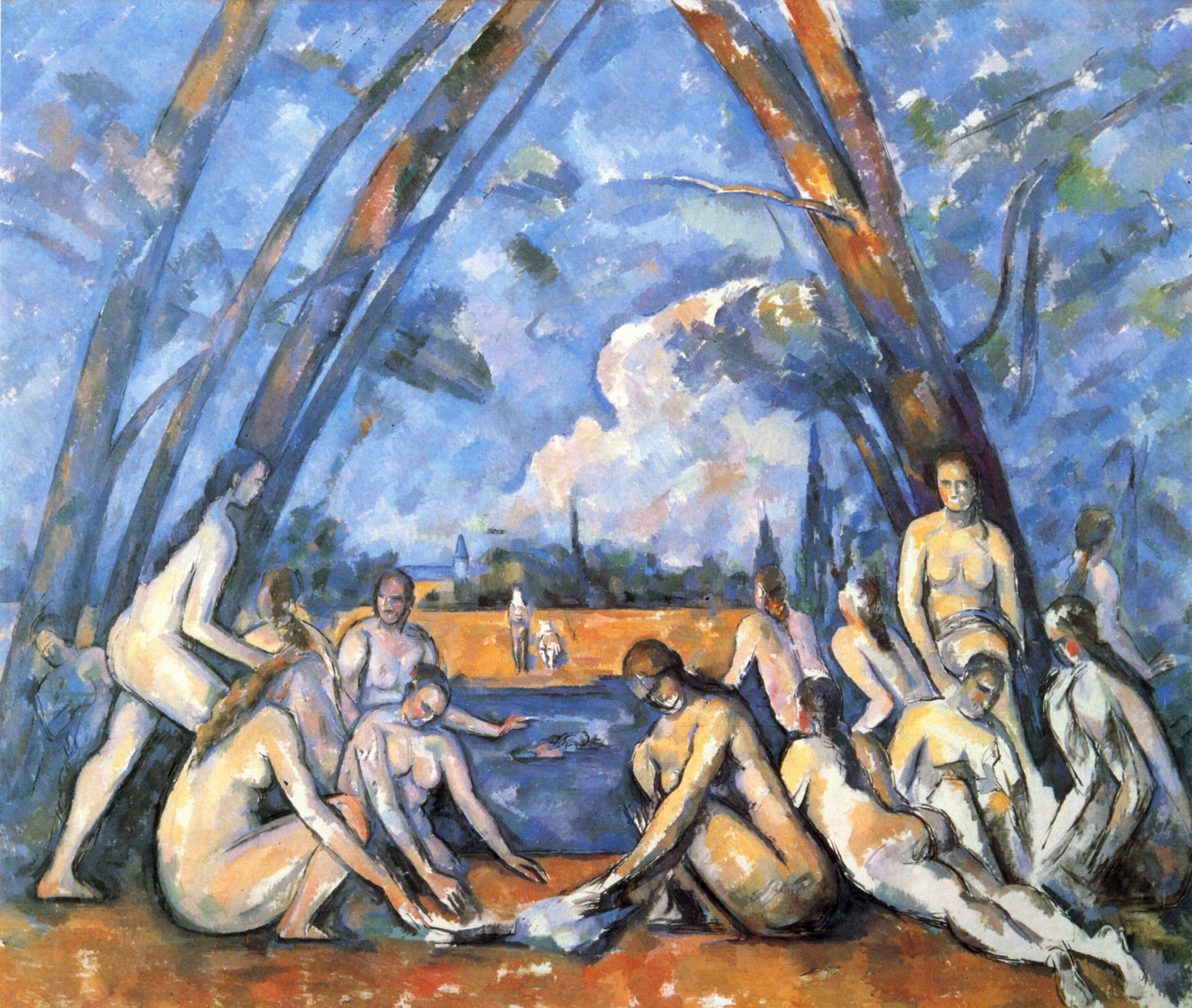
Paul Cézanne, The Large Bathers, 1898–1905

Modern art includes artistic work produced during the period extending roughly from the 1860s to the 1970s, and denotes the styles and philosophies of the art produced during that era. The term is usually associated with art in which the traditions of the past have been thrown aside in a spirit of experimentation. Modern artists experimented with new ways of seeing and with fresh ideas about the nature of materials and functions of art. A tendency away from the narrative, which was characteristic of the traditional arts, toward abstraction is characteristic of much modern art. More recent artistic production is often called contemporary art or Postmodern art.

Modern art begins with the post-impressionist painters like Vincent van Gogh, Paul Cézanne, Paul Gauguin, Georges Seurat and Henri de Toulouse-Lautrec. These artists were essential to modern art's development. At the beginning of the 20th century Henri Matisse and several other young artists including the pre-cubists Georges Braque, André Derain, Raoul Dufy, Jean Metzinger and Maurice de Vlaminck revolutionized the Paris art world with "wild," multi-colored, expressive landscapes and figure paintings that the critics called Fauvism. Matisse's two versions of The Dance signified a key point in his career and the development of modern painting. It reflected Matisse's incipient fascination with tribal art: the intense warm color of the figures against the cool blue-green background and the rhythmical succession of the dancing nudes convey the feelings of emotional liberation and hedonism.

At the start of 20th-century Western painting, and initially influenced by Toulouse-Lautrec, Gauguin and other late-19th-century innovators, Pablo Picasso made his first Cubist paintings. Picasso based these works on Cézanne's idea that all depiction of nature can be reduced to three solids: cube, sphere and cone. Picasso dramatically created a new and radical picture depicting a raw and tribal brothel scene with five prostitutes, violently painted women, reminiscent of African tribal masks and his new Cubist inventions. He named it Les Demoiselles d'Avignon (The Young Ladies of Avignon, originally titled The Brothel of Avignon). Between 1905 and 1911 German Expressionism emerged in Dresden and Munich with artists like Ernst Ludwig Kirchner, Wassily Kandinsky, Franz Marc, Paul Klee and August Macke. Analytic cubism was jointly developed by Picasso and Georges Braque, exemplified by Violin and Candlestick, Paris, from about 1908 through 1912. Analytic cubism, the first clear manifestation of cubism, was followed by Synthetic cubism, practiced by Braque, Picasso, Fernand Léger, Juan Gris, Albert Gleizes, Marcel Duchamp and several other artists into the 1920s. Synthetic cubism is characterized by the introduction of different textures, surfaces, collage elements, papier collé and a large variety of merged subject matter.

The notion of modern art is closely related to Modernism. (Note: "One way of understanding the relation of the terms 'modern,' 'modernity,' and 'Modernism' is that aesthetic modernism is a form of art characteristic of high or actualized late modernity, that is, of that period in which social, economic, and cultural life in the widest sense [was] revolutionized by modernity ... [this means] that Modernist art is scarcely thinkable outside the context of the modernized society of the late nineteenth and twentieth centuries. Social modernity is the home of Modernist art, even where that art rebels against it." — Lawrence E. Cahoone)

== History ==
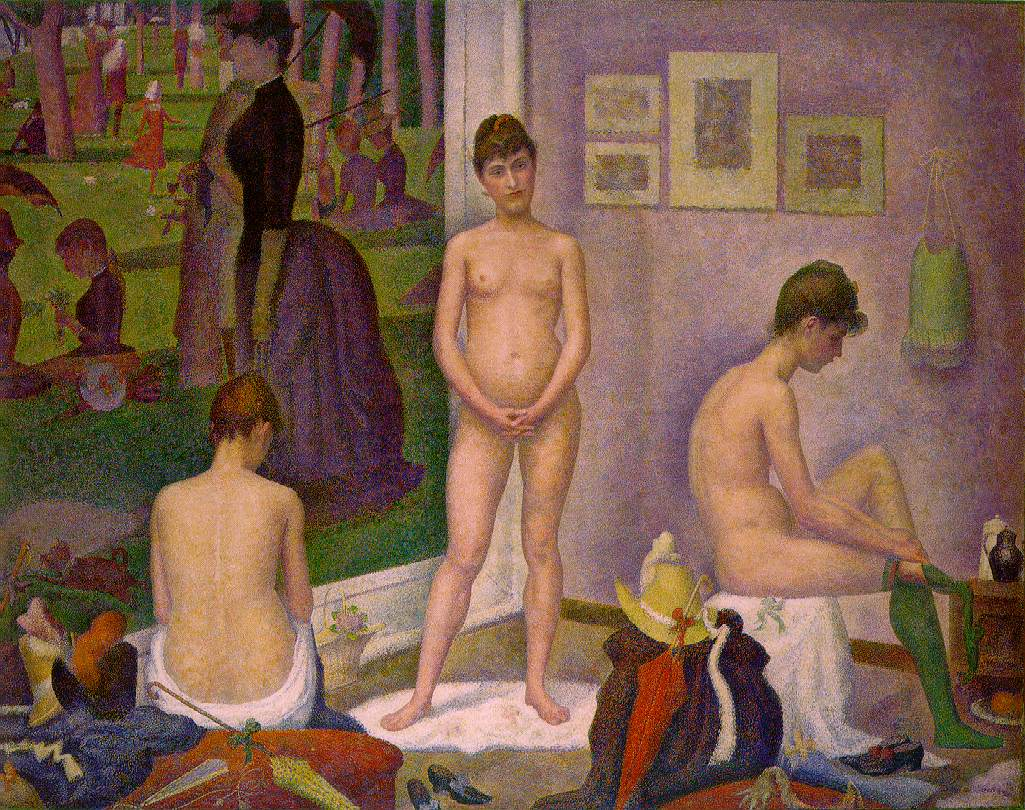
Georges Seurat, Models (Les Poseuses), 1886–88, Barnes Foundation

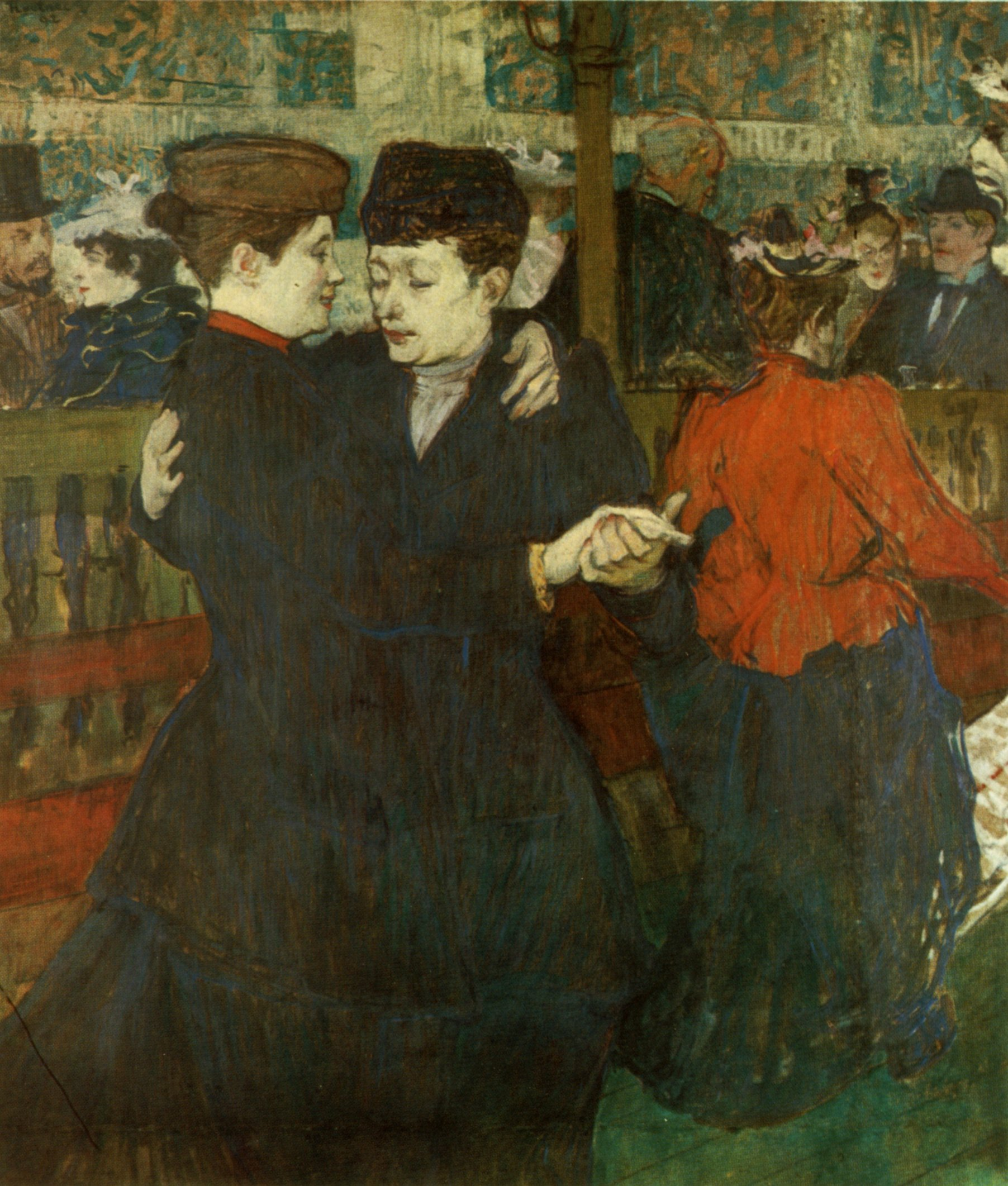
Henri de Toulouse-Lautrec, At the Moulin Rouge: Two Women Waltzing, 1892

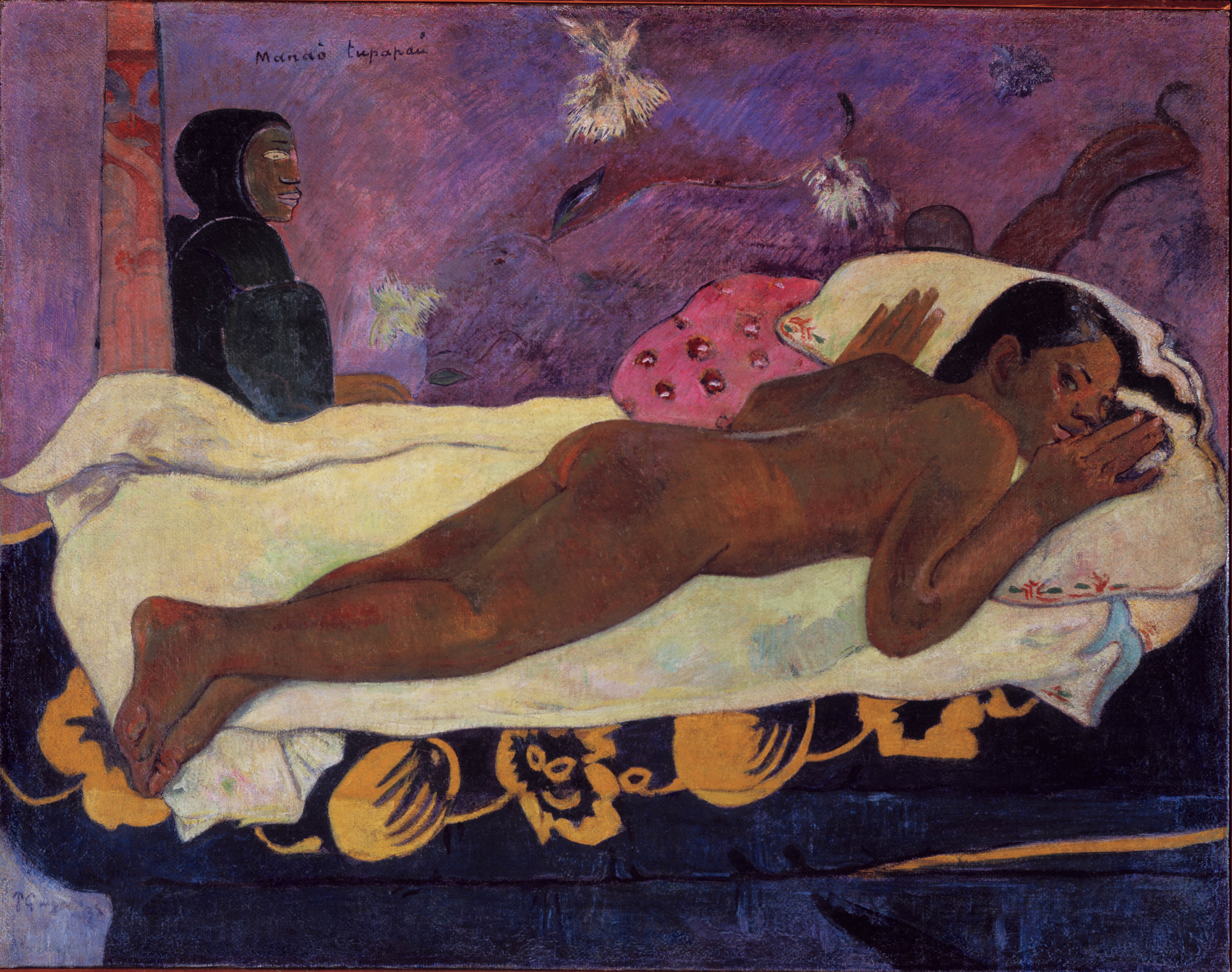
Paul Gauguin, Spirit of the Dead Watching, 1892, Albright-Knox Art Gallery

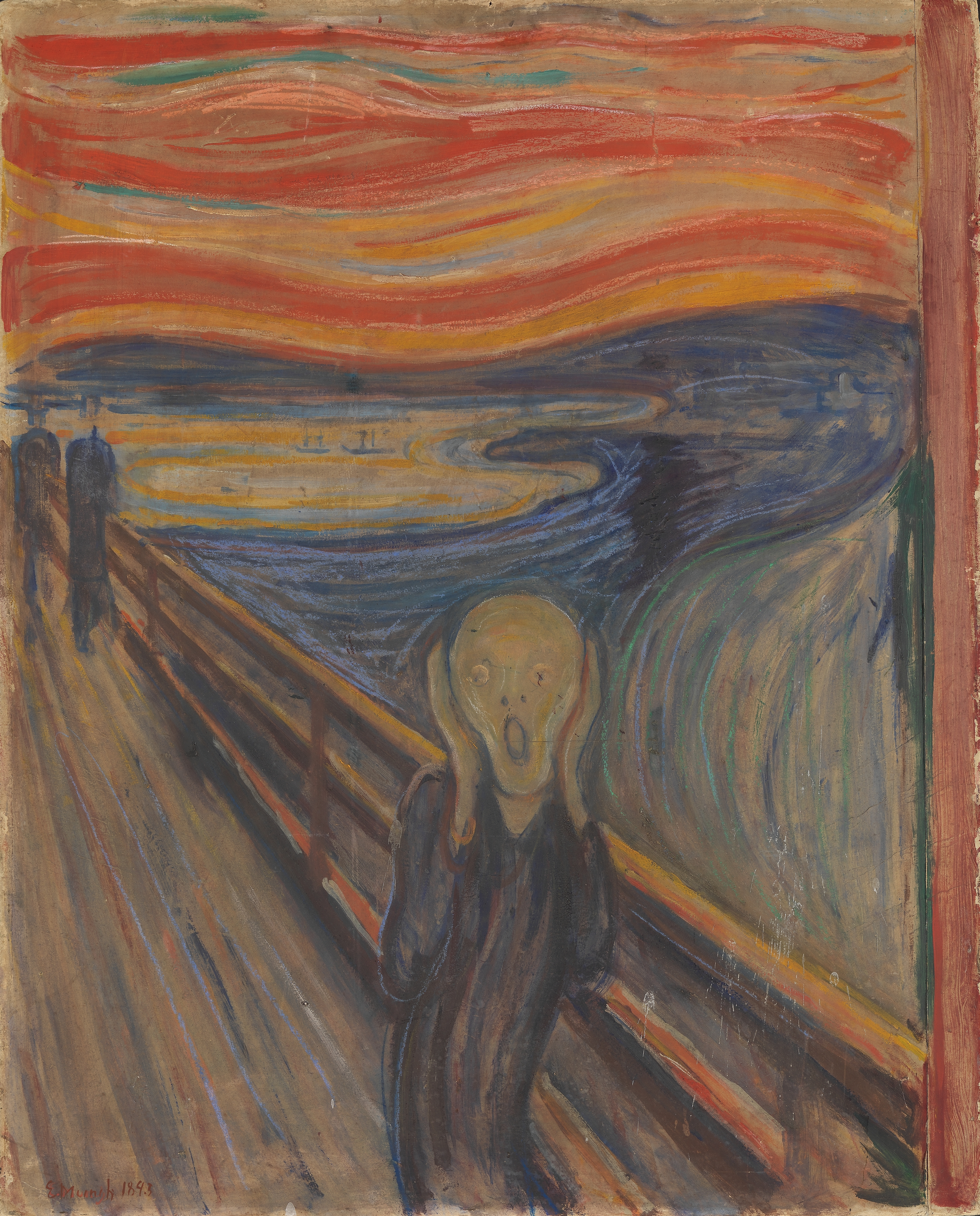
The Scream by Edvard Munch, 1893

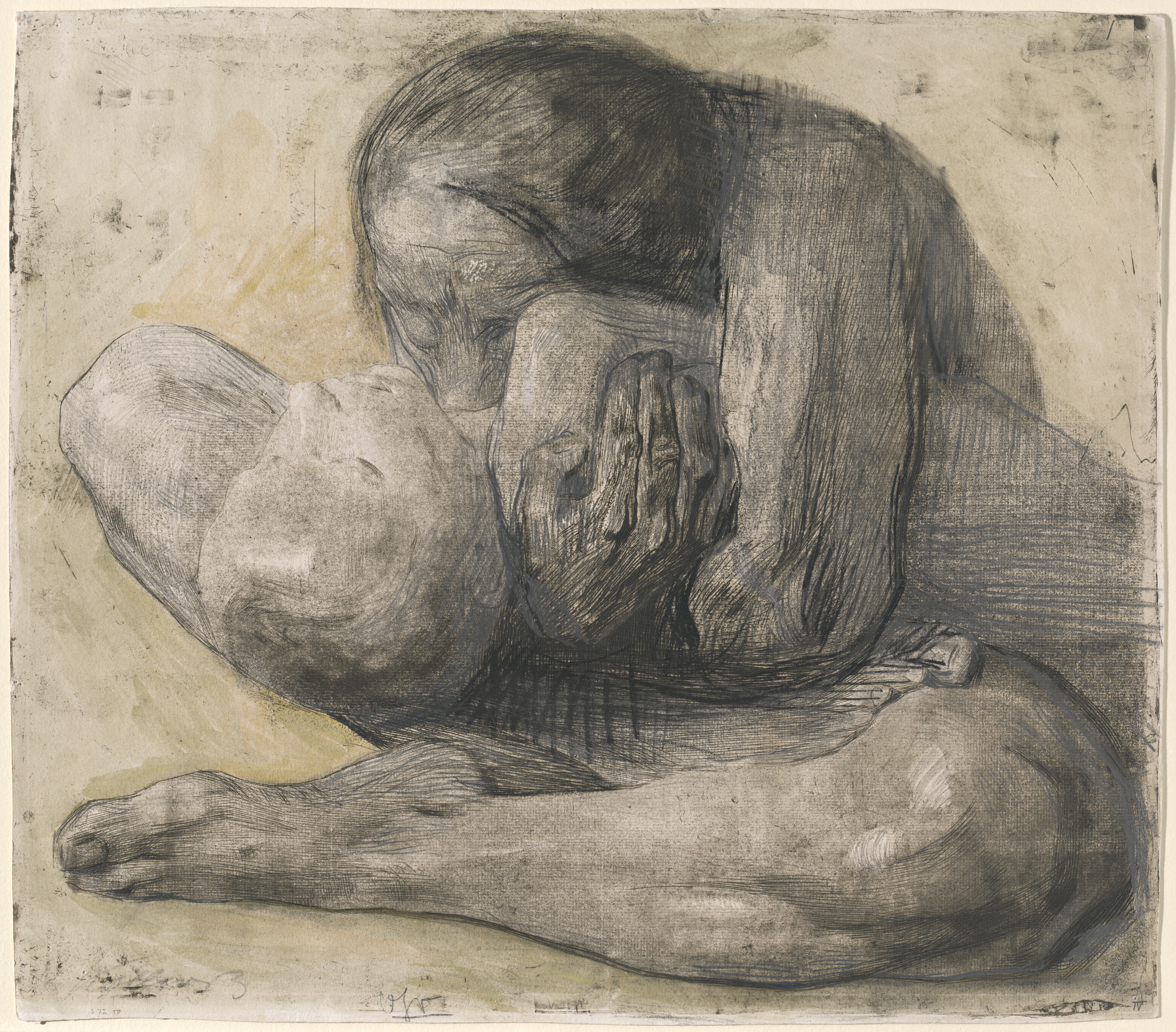
Käthe Kollwitz, Woman with Dead Child, 1903 etching

Pablo Picasso, Family of Saltimbanques, 1905, National Gallery of Art, Washington, DC.

Jean Metzinger, Paysage coloré aux oiseaux aquatiques, 1907, oil on canvas, 74 × 99 cm, Musée d'Art Moderne de la Ville de Paris

Marc Chagall, I and the Village, 1911

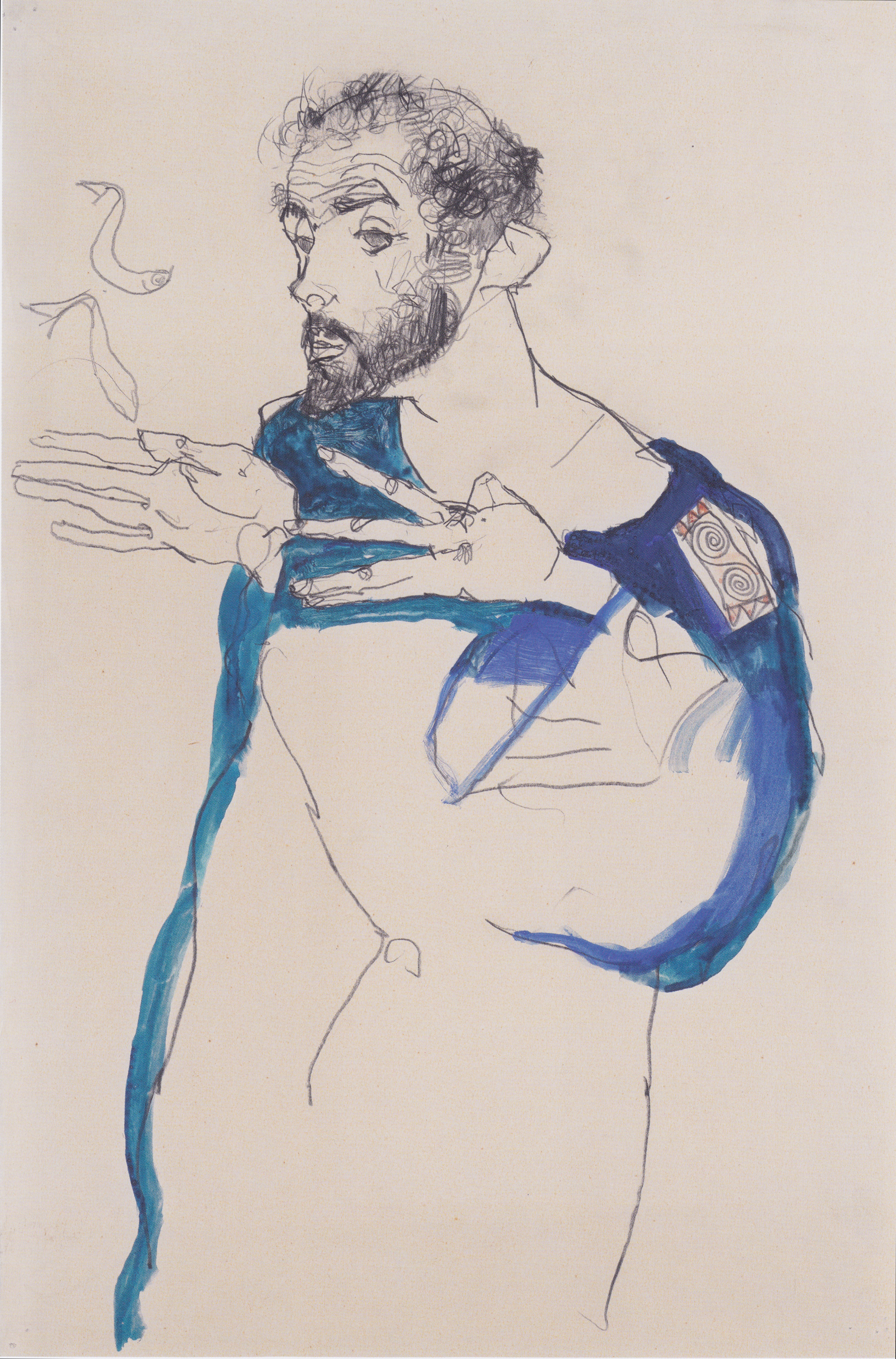
Egon Schiele, Klimt in a light Blue Smock, 1913

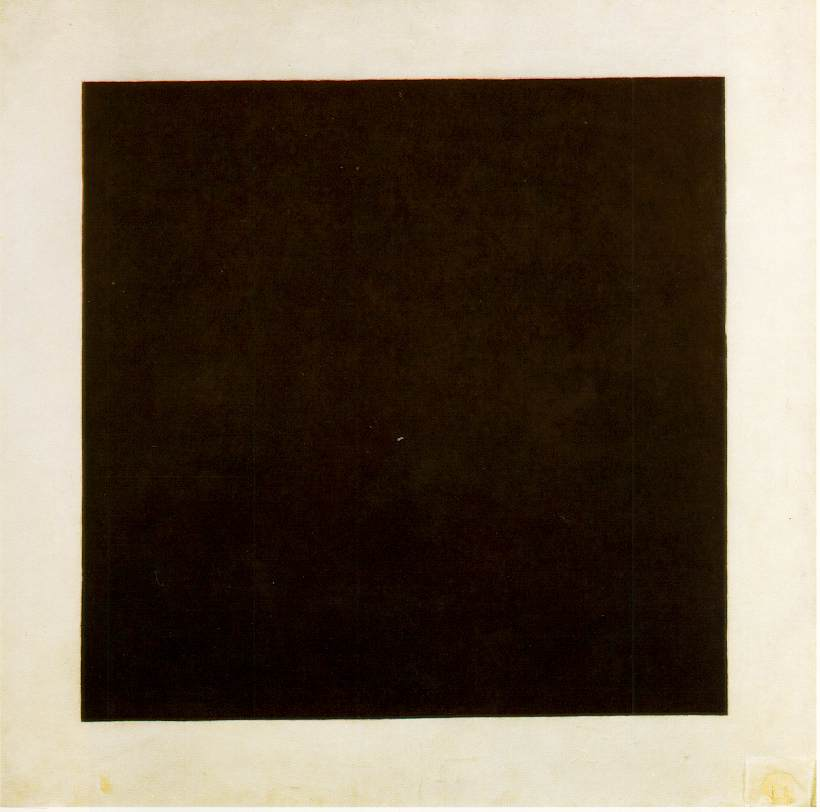
Kasimir Malevich, Black Square, 1915

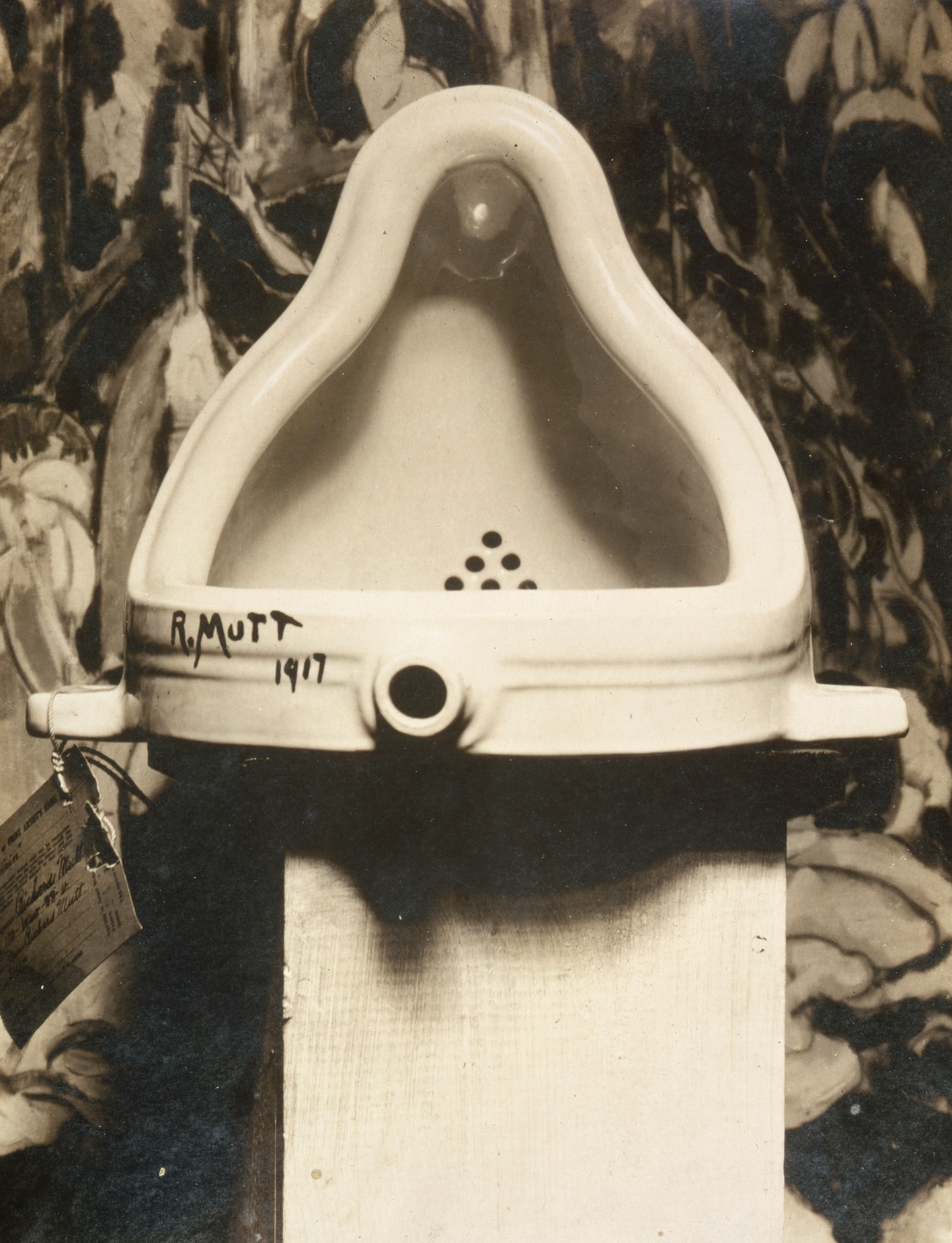
Marcel Duchamp, Fountain, 1917. Photograph by Alfred Stieglitz

Hannah Höch, Cut with the Kitchen Knife through the Last Epoch of Weimar Beer-Belly Culture in Germany, 1919, collage of pasted papers, 90×144 cm, Nationalgalerie, Staatliche Museen zu Berlin

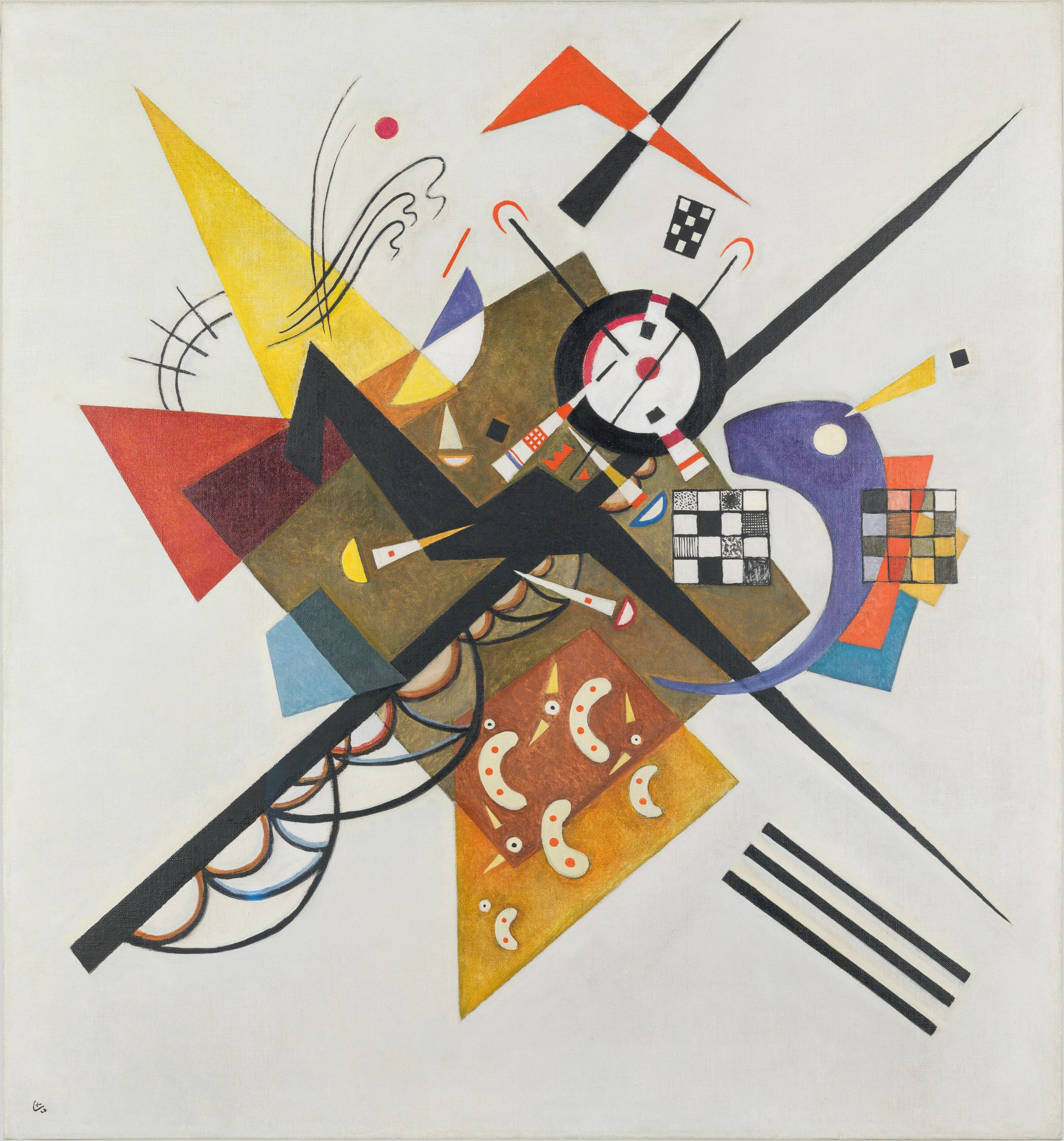
Wassily Kandinsky, On White II, 1923

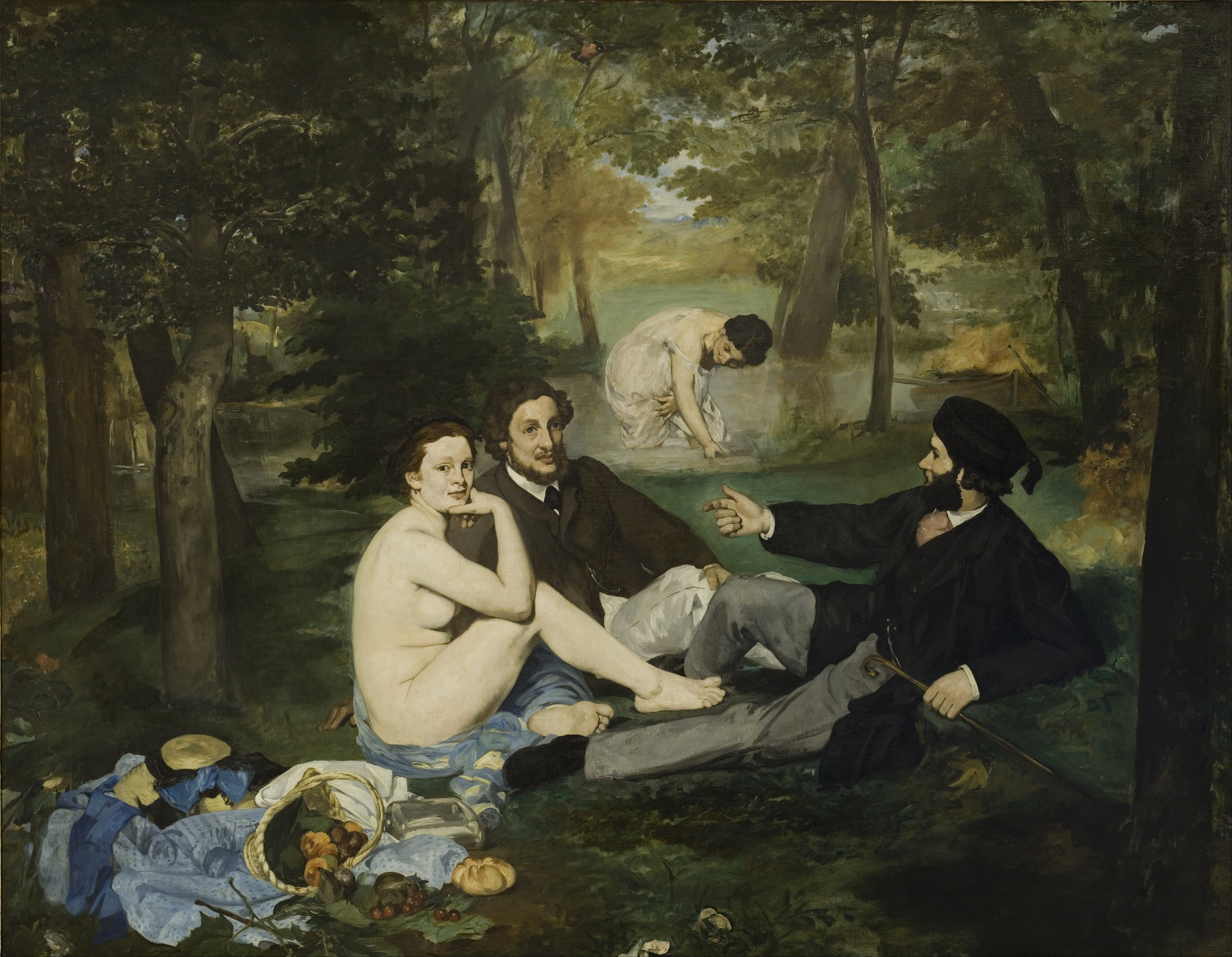
Édouard Manet, The Luncheon on the Grass (Le déjeuner sur l'herbe), 1863, Musée d'Orsay, Paris

=== Roots in the 19th century ===
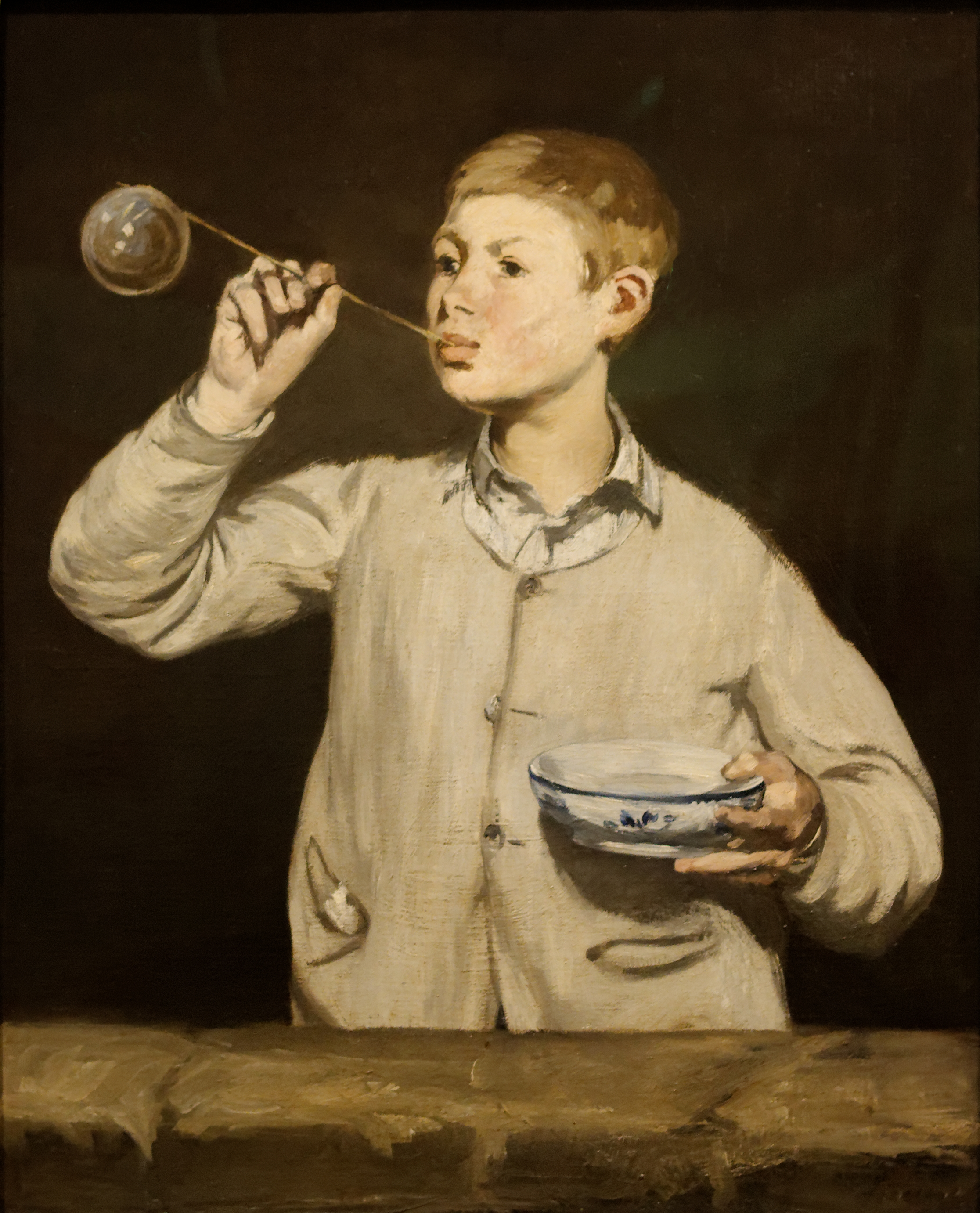
Édouard Manet, Boy Blowing Bubbles, 1867, Calouste Gulbenkian Museum

Although modern sculpture and architecture are reckoned to have emerged at the end of the 19th century, the beginnings of modern painting can be located earlier. Francisco Goya is considered by many as the Father of Modern Painting without being a Modernist himself, a fact of art history that later painters associated with Modernism as a style, acknowledge him as an influence. The date perhaps most commonly identified as marking the birth of modern art as a movement is 1863, the year that Édouard Manet showed his painting Le déjeuner sur l'herbe in the Salon des Refusés in Paris. Earlier dates have also been proposed, among them 1855 (the year Gustave Courbet exhibited The Artist's Studio) and 1784 (the year Jacques-Louis David completed his painting The Oath of the Horatii). In the words of art historian H. Harvard Arnason: "Each of these dates has significance for the development of modern art, but none categorically marks a completely new beginning .... A gradual metamorphosis took place in the course of a hundred years."

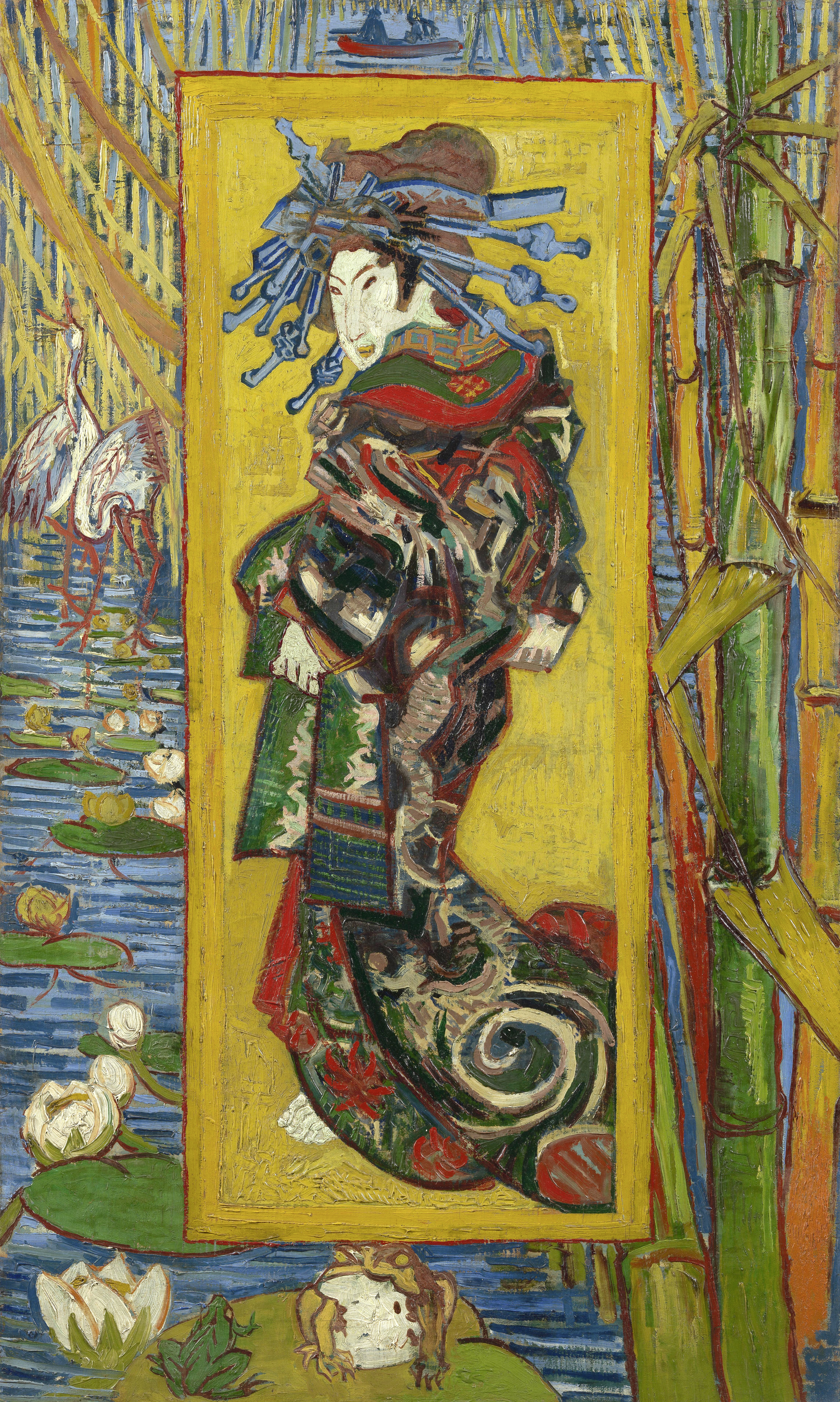
Vincent van Gogh, Courtesan (after Eisen) (1887), Van Gogh Museum

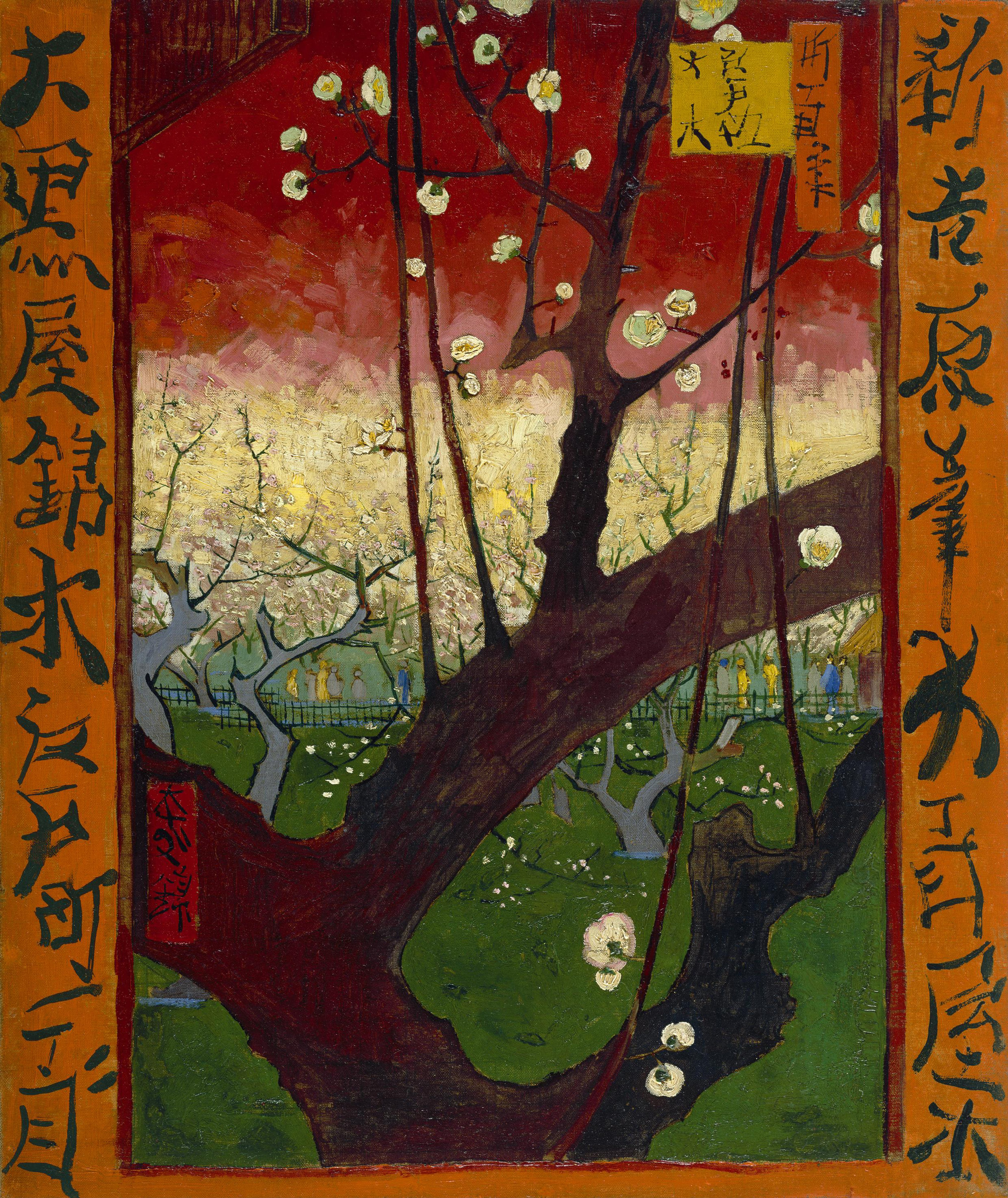
Vincent van Gogh, The Blooming Plumtree (after Hiroshige) (1887), Van Gogh Museum

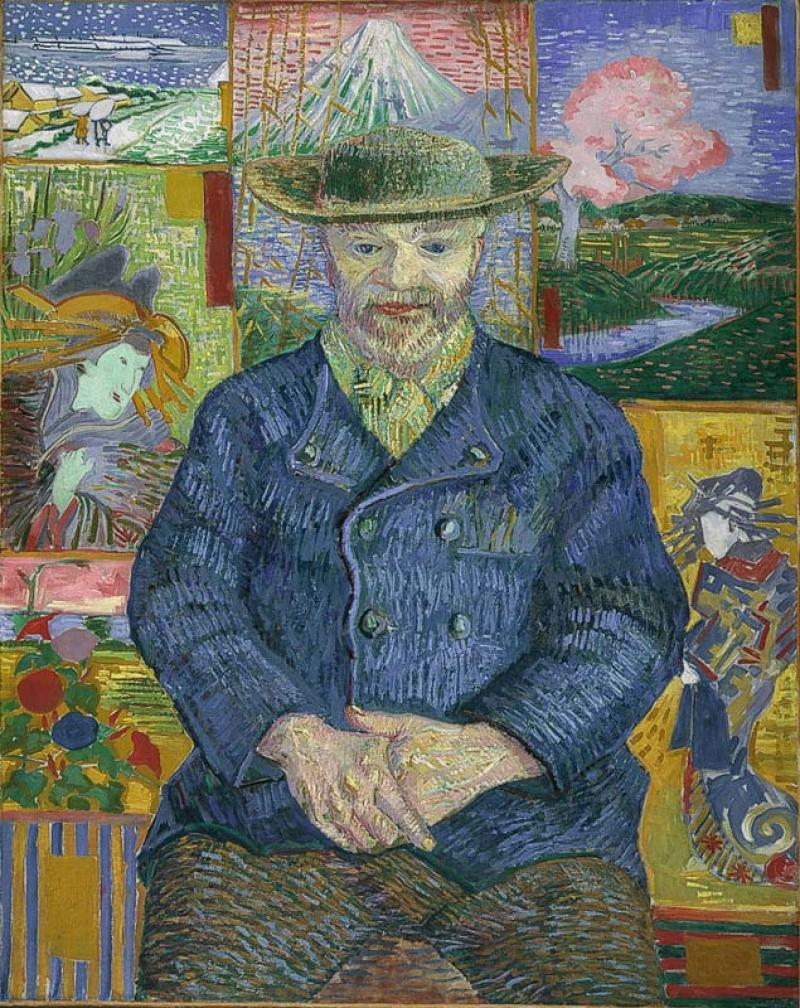
Vincent van Gogh, Portrait of Père Tanguy (1887), Musée Rodin

The strands of thought that eventually led to modern art can be traced back to the Enlightenment. (Note: "In the seventeenth and eighteenth centuries momentum began to gather behind a new view of the world, which would eventually create a new world, the modern world." – Lawrence E. Cahoone) The modern art critic Clement Greenberg, for instance, called Immanuel Kant "the first real Modernist" but also drew a distinction: "The Enlightenment criticized from the outside ... Modernism criticizes from the inside." The French Revolution of 1789 uprooted assumptions and institutions that had for centuries been accepted with little question and accustomed the public to vigorous political and social debate. This gave rise to what art historian Ernst Gombrich called a "self-consciousness that made people select the style of their building as one selects the pattern of a wallpaper."

The pioneers of modern art were Romantics, Realists and Impressionists. By the late 19th century, additional movements which were to be influential in modern art had begun to emerge: Post-Impressionism and Symbolism.

Influences upon these movements were varied: from exposure to Eastern decorative arts, particularly Japanese printmaking, to the coloristic innovations of Turner and Delacroix, to a search for more realism in the depiction of common life, as found in the work of painters such as Jean-François Millet. The advocates of realism stood against the idealism of the tradition-bound academic art that enjoyed public and official favor. The most successful painters of the day worked either through commissions or through large public exhibitions of their work. There were official, government-sponsored painters' unions, while governments regularly held public exhibitions of new fine and decorative arts.

The Impressionists argued that people do not see objects but only the light that they reflect, and therefore painters should paint in natural light (en plein air) rather than in studios and should capture the effects of light in their work. Impressionist artists formed a group, Société Anonyme Coopérative des Artistes Peintres, Sculpteurs, Graveurs ("Association of Painters, Sculptors, and Engravers") which, despite internal tensions, mounted a series of independent exhibitions. The style was adopted by artists in different nations, in preference to a "national" style. These factors established the view that it was a "movement." These traits—establishment of a working method integral to the art, the establishment of a movement or visible active core of support, and international adoption—would be repeated by artistic movements in the Modern period in art.

=== Early 20th century ===
Pablo Picasso, Les Demoiselles d'Avignon, 1907, Museum of Modern Art, New York

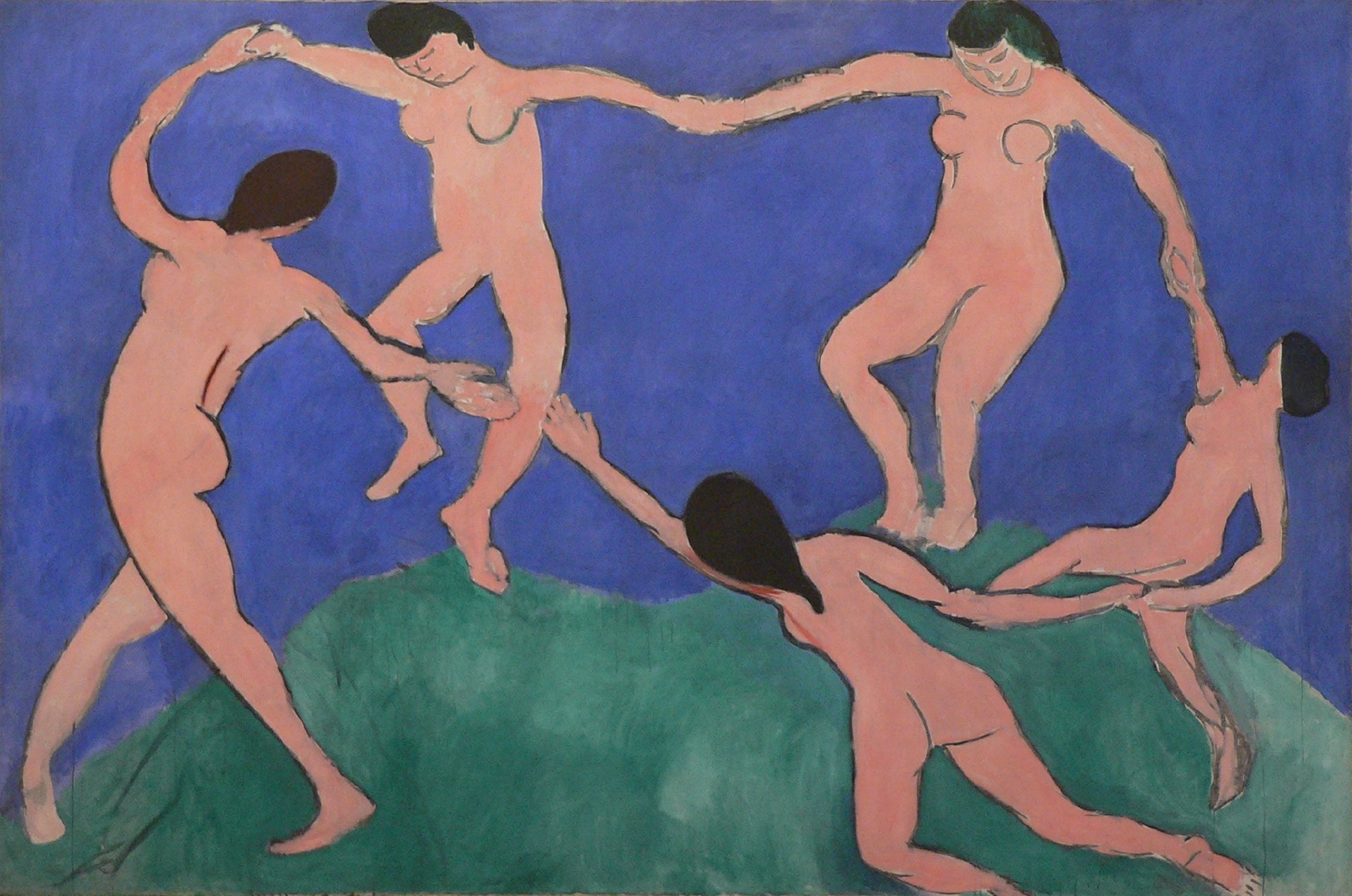
Henri Matisse, The Dance I, 1909, Museum of Modern Art, New York

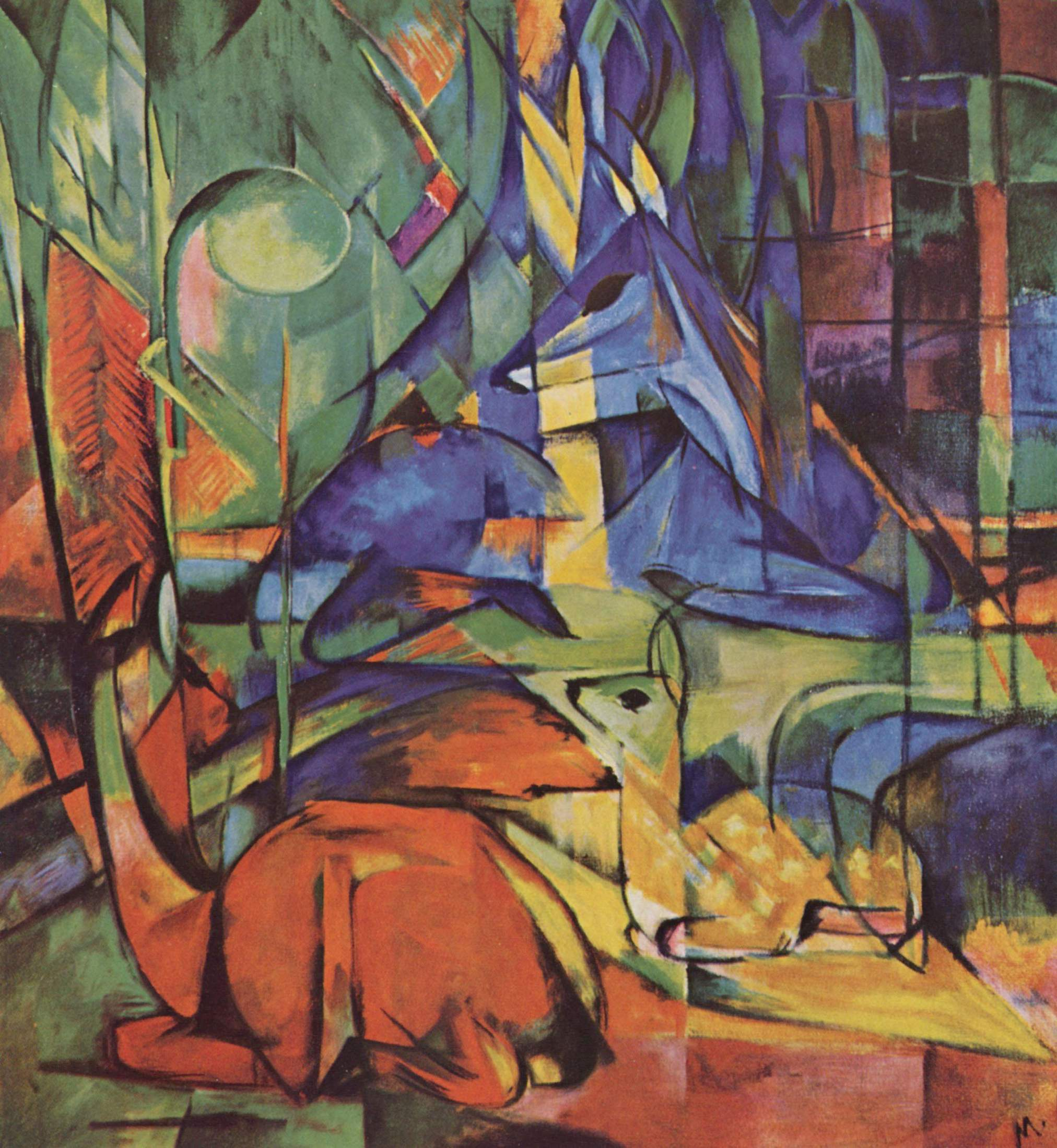
Franz Marc, Rehe im Walde (Deer in Woods), 1914, Kunsthalle Karlsruhe

Among the movements that flowered in the first decade of the 20th century were Fauvism, Cubism, Expressionism, and Futurism.

In 1905, a group of four German artists, led by Ernst Ludwig Kirchner, formed Die Brücke (The Bridge) in the city of Dresden. This was arguably the founding organization for the German Expressionist movement, though they did not use the word itself. A few years later, in 1911, a like-minded group of young artists formed Der Blaue Reiter (The Blue Rider) in Munich. The name came from Wassily Kandinsky's Der Blaue Reiter painting of 1903. Among their members were Kandinsky, Franz Marc, Paul Klee, and August Macke. However, the term "Expressionism" did not firmly establish itself until 1913.

Futurism took off in Italy a couple years before World War I with the publication of Filippo Tommaso Marinetti's Futurist Manifesto. Benedetta Cappa Marinetti, wife of Filippo Tommaso Marinetti, created the second wave of the artistic movement started by her husband. "Largely thanks to Benedetta, her husband F.T. Marinetti re orchestrated the shifting ideologies of Futurism to embrace feminine elements of intuition, spirituality, and the mystical forces of the earth." She painted up until his death and spent the rest of her days tending to the spread and growth of this period in Italian art, which celebrated technology, speed, and all things new.

During the years between 1910 and the end of World War I and after the heyday of cubism, several movements emerged in Paris. Giorgio de Chirico moved to Paris in July 1911, where he joined his brother Andrea (the poet and painter known as Alberto Savinio). Through his brother, he met Pierre Laprade, a member of the jury at the Salon d'Automne where he exhibited three of his dreamlike works: Enigma of the Oracle, Enigma of an Afternoon and Self-Portrait. In 1913, he exhibited his work at the Salon des Indépendants and Salon d'Automne, and his work was noticed by Pablo Picasso, Guillaume Apollinaire, and several others. His compelling and mysterious paintings are considered instrumental to the early beginnings of Surrealism. Song of Love (1914) is one of the most famous works by de Chirico and is an early example of the surrealist style, though it was painted ten years before the movement was "founded" by André Breton in 1924. The School of Paris, centered in Montparnasse, flourished between the two world wars.

World War I brought an end to this phase but indicated the beginning of many anti-art movements, such as the in Zürich and Berlin emerging Dada, including the work of Emmy Hennings, Hannah Höch, Hugo Ball and Marcel Duchamp, and of Surrealism. Artist groups like de Stijl and Bauhaus developed new ideas about the interrelation of the arts, architecture, design, and art education.

Modern art was introduced to the United States with the Armory Show in 1913 and through European artists who moved to the U.S. during World War I.

=== After World War II ===
It was only after World War II, however, that the U.S. became the focal point of new artistic movements. The 1950s and 1960s saw the emergence of Abstract Expressionism, Color field painting, Conceptual artists of Art & Language, Pop art, Op art, Hard-edge painting, Minimal art, Lyrical Abstraction, Fluxus, Happening, video art, Postminimalism, Photorealism and various other movements. In the late 1960s and the 1970s, Land art, performance art, conceptual art, and other new art forms attracted the attention of curators and critics, at the expense of more traditional media. Larger installations and performances became widespread.

By the end of the 1970s, when cultural critics began speaking of "the end of painting" (the title of a provocative essay written in 1981 by Douglas Crimp), new media art had become a category in itself, with a growing number of artists experimenting with technological means such as video art. Painting assumed renewed importance in the 1980s and 1990s, as evidenced by the rise of neo-expressionism and the revival of figurative painting.

Towards the end of the 20th century, many artists and architects started questioning the idea of "the modern" and created typically Postmodern works.

== Art movements and artist groups ==
(Roughly chronological with representative artists listed.)

=== 19th century ===
- Romanticism and the Romantic movement – Francisco de Goya, J. M. W. Turner, Eugène Delacroix
- Realism – Gustave Courbet, Camille Corot, Jean-François Millet, Rosa Bonheur
- Pre-Raphaelites – William Holman Hunt, John Everett Millais, Dante Gabriel Rossetti
- Macchiaioli – Giovanni Fattori, Silvestro Lega, Telemaco Signorini
- Impressionism – Frédéric Bazille, Gustave Caillebotte, Mary Cassatt, Edgar Degas, Armand Guillaumin, Édouard Manet, Claude Monet, Berthe Morisot, Pierre-Auguste Renoir, Camille Pissarro, Alfred Sisley
- Post-Impressionism – Georges Seurat, Paul Cézanne, Paul Gauguin, Vincent van Gogh, Henri de Toulouse-Lautrec, Henri Rousseau, Henri-Jean Guillaume Martin, Albert Lebourg, Robert Antoine Pinchon
- Pointillism – Georges Seurat, Paul Signac, Maximilien Luce, Henri-Edmond Cross
- Divisionism – Gaetano Previati, Giovanni Segantini, Pellizza da Volpedo
- Symbolism – Gustave Moreau, Odilon Redon, Edvard Munch, James Whistler, James Ensor
- Les Nabis – Pierre Bonnard, Édouard Vuillard, Félix Vallotton, Maurice Denis, Paul Sérusier
- Art Nouveau and variants – Jugendstil, Secession, Modern Style, Modernisme – Aubrey Beardsley, Alphonse Mucha, Gustav Klimt,
- Art Nouveau architecture and design – Antoni Gaudí, Otto Wagner, Wiener Werkstätte, Josef Hoffmann, Adolf Loos, Koloman Moser
- Early Modernist sculptors – Aristide Maillol, Auguste Rodin

=== Early 20th century (before World War I) ===
- Abstract art – Francis Picabia, Wassily Kandinsky, František Kupka, Robert Delaunay, Sonia Delaunay, Léopold Survage, Piet Mondrian, Kazimir Malevich, Hilma af Klint
- Fauvism – André Derain, Henri Matisse, Maurice de Vlaminck, Georges Braque, Kees van Dongen
- Expressionism and related – Die Brücke, Der Blaue Reiter – Ernst Ludwig Kirchner, Wassily Kandinsky, Franz Marc, Egon Schiele, Oskar Kokoschka, Emil Nolde, Axel Törneman, Karl Schmidt-Rottluff, Max Pechstein
- Cubism – Pablo Picasso, Georges Braque, Jean Metzinger, Albert Gleizes, Fernand Léger, Robert Delaunay, Henri Le Fauconnier, Marcel Duchamp, Jacques Villon, Francis Picabia, Juan Gris
- Futurism – Filippo Tommaso Marinetti, Benedetta Cappa Marinetti, Giacomo Balla, Umberto Boccioni, Carlo Carrà, Gino Severini, Natalia Goncharova, Mikhail Larionov
- Orphism – Robert Delaunay, Sonia Delaunay, František Kupka
- Suprematism – Kazimir Malevich, Alexander Rodchenko, El Lissitzky
- Synchromism – Stanton Macdonald-Wright, Morgan Russell
- Vorticism – Wyndham Lewis
- Sculpture – Constantin Brâncuși, Joseph Csaky, Alexander Archipenko, Raymond Duchamp-Villon, Jacques Lipchitz, Ossip Zadkine, Henri Laurens, Elie Nadelman, Chaim Gross, Chana Orloff, Jacob Epstein, Gustave Miklos, Antoine Bourdelle
- Photography – Pictorialism, Straight photography

=== World War I to World War II ===
- Dada – Jean Arp, Marcel Duchamp, Max Ernst, Francis Picabia, Kurt Schwitters
- Surrealism – Marc Chagall, René Magritte, Jean Arp, Salvador Dalí, Max Ernst, Giorgio de Chirico, André Masson, Joan Miró
- Expressionism and related: Chaim Soutine, Abraham Mintchine, Isaac Frenkel
- Pittura Metafisica – Giorgio de Chirico, Carlo Carrà, Giorgio Morandi
- De Stijl – Theo van Doesburg, Piet Mondrian
- New Objectivity – Max Beckmann, Otto Dix, George Grosz
- Figurative painting – Henri Matisse, Pierre Bonnard
- American Modernism – Stuart Davis, Arthur G. Dove, Marsden Hartley, Georgia O'Keeffe
- Constructivism – Naum Gabo, Gustav Klutsis, László Moholy-Nagy, El Lissitzky, Kasimir Malevich, Vadim Meller, Alexander Rodchenko, Vladimir Tatlin
- Bauhaus – Wassily Kandinsky, Paul Klee, Josef Albers
- Scottish Colourists – Francis Cadell, Samuel Peploe, Leslie Hunter, John Duncan Fergusson
- Social realism – Grant Wood, Walker Evans, Diego Rivera
- Precisionism – Charles Sheeler, Charles Demuth
- Boychukism – Mykhailo Boychuk, Sofiya Nalepinska-Boychuk, Ivan Padalka, Vasily Sedlyar
- Sculpture – Alexander Calder, Alberto Giacometti, Gaston Lachaise, Henry Moore, Pablo Picasso, Julio Gonzalez

=== After World War II ===
- Figuratifs – Bernard Buffet, Jean Carzou, Maurice Boitel, Daniel du Janerand, Claude-Max Lochu
- Sculpture – Henry Moore, David Smith, Tony Smith, Alexander Calder, Richard Hunt, Isamu Noguchi, Alberto Giacometti, Sir Anthony Caro, Jean Dubuffet, Isaac Witkin, René Iché, Marino Marini, Louise Nevelson, Albert Vrana
- Abstract expressionism – Joan Mitchell, Willem de Kooning, Jackson Pollock, Arshile Gorky, Hans Hofmann, Franz Kline, Robert Motherwell, Clyfford Still, Lee Krasner,
- American Abstract Artists – Ilya Bolotowsky, Ibram Lassaw, Ad Reinhardt, Josef Albers, Burgoyne Diller
- Art Brut – Adolf Wölfli, August Natterer, Ferdinand Cheval, Madge Gill
- Arte Povera – Jannis Kounellis, Luciano Fabro, Mario Merz, Piero Manzoni, Alighiero Boetti
- Color field painting – Barnett Newman, Mark Rothko, Adolph Gottlieb, Sam Francis, Morris Louis, Kenneth Noland, Jules Olitski, Helen Frankenthaler
- Tachisme – Jean Dubuffet, Pierre Soulages, Hans Hartung, Ludwig Merwart
- COBRA – Pierre Alechinsky, Karel Appel, Asger Jorn
- Conceptual art – Art & Language, Dan Graham, Lawrence Weiner, Bruce Nauman, Daniel Buren, Victor Burgin, Sol LeWitt
- De-collage – Wolf Vostell, Mimmo Rotella
- Neo-Dada – Robert Rauschenberg, Jasper Johns, John Chamberlain, Joseph Beuys, Lee Bontecou, Edward Kienholz
- Figurative Expressionism – Larry Rivers, Grace Hartigan, Elaine de Kooning, Robert De Niro, Sr., Lester Johnson, George McNeil, Earle M. Pilgrim, Jan Müller, Robert Beauchamp, Bob Thompson
- Feminist Art — Eva Hesse, Judy Chicago, Barbara Kruger, Mary Beth Edelson, Ewa Partum, Valie Export, Yoko Ono, Louise Bourgeois, Cindy Sherman, Kiki Smith, Guerrilla Girls, Hannah Wilke
- Fluxus – George Maciunas, Joseph Beuys, Wolf Vostell, Nam June Paik, Daniel Spoerri, Dieter Roth, Carolee Schneeman, Alison Knowles, Charlotte Moorman, Dick Higgins
- Happening – Allan Kaprow, Joseph Beuys, Wolf Vostell, Claes Oldenburg, Jim Dine, Red Grooms, Nam June Paik, Charlotte Moorman, Robert Whitman, Yoko Ono
- Dau-al-Set – founded in Barcelona by poet/artist Joan Brossa, – Antoni Tàpies
- Grupo El Paso – founded in Madrid by artists Antonio Saura, Pablo Serrano
- Geometric abstraction – Wassily Kandinsky, Kazimir Malevich, Nadir Afonso, Manlio Rho, Mario Radice, Mino Argento, Adam Szentpétery
- Hard-edge painting – John McLaughlin, Ellsworth Kelly, Frank Stella, Al Held, Ronald Davis
- Kinetic art – George Rickey, Getulio Alviani
- Land art – Ana Mendieta, Christo, Richard Long, Robert Smithson, Michael Heizer
- Les Automatistes – Claude Gauvreau, Jean-Paul Riopelle, Pierre Gauvreau, Fernand Leduc, Jean-Paul Mousseau, Marcelle Ferron
- Minimal art – Sol LeWitt, Donald Judd, Dan Flavin, Richard Serra, Agnes Martin
- Postminimalism – Eva Hesse, Bruce Nauman, Lynda Benglis
- Lyrical abstraction – Ronnie Landfield, Sam Gilliam, Larry Zox, Dan Christensen, Natvar Bhavsar, Larry Poons
- Neo-figurative art – Fernando Botero, Antonio Berni
- Neo-expressionism – Georg Baselitz, Anselm Kiefer, Jörg Immendorff, Jean-Michel Basquiat
- Transavanguardia – Francesco Clemente, Mimmo Paladino, Sandro Chia, Enzo Cucchi
- Figuration libre – Hervé Di Rosa, François Boisrond, Robert Combas
- New realism – Yves Klein, Pierre Restany, Arman
- Op art – Victor Vasarely, Bridget Riley, Richard Anuszkiewicz, Jeffrey Steele
- Outsider art – Howard Finster, Grandma Moses, Bob Justin
- Photorealism – Audrey Flack, Chuck Close, Duane Hanson, Richard Estes, Malcolm Morley
- Pop art – Richard Hamilton, Robert Indiana, Jasper Johns, Roy Lichtenstein, Robert Rauschenberg, Andy Warhol, Ed Ruscha, David Hockney
- Postwar European figurative painting – Lucian Freud, Francis Bacon, Frank Auerbach, Gerhard Richter
- New European Painting – Luc Tuymans, Marlene Dumas, Neo Rauch, Bracha Ettinger, Michaël Borremans, Chris Ofili
- Shaped canvas – Frank Stella, Kenneth Noland, Ron Davis, Robert Mangold.
- Soviet art – Aleksandr Deyneka, Aleksandr Gerasimov, Ilya Kabakov, Komar & Melamid, Alexandr Zhdanov, Leonid Sokov
- Spatialism – Lucio Fontana
- Video art – Nam June Paik, Wolf Vostell, Joseph Beuys, Bill Viola, Hans Breder
- Visionary art – Ernst Fuchs, Paul Laffoley, Michael Bowen

== Notable modern art exhibitions and museums ==
=== Austria ===
- Leopold Museum, Vienna

=== Belgium ===
- SMAK, Ghent

=== Brazil ===
- MASP, São Paulo, SP
- MAM/SP, São Paulo, SP
- MAM/RJ, Rio de Janeiro, RJ
- MAM/BA, Salvador, Bahia

=== Colombia ===
- Bogotá Museum of Modern Art (MAMBO)

=== Croatia ===
- Ivan Meštrović Gallery, Split
- Modern Gallery, Zagreb
- Museum of Contemporary Art, Zagreb

=== Ecuador ===
- Museo Antropologico y de Arte Contemporaneo, Guayaquil
- La Capilla del Hombre, Quito

=== Finland ===
- EMMA, Espoo
- Kiasma, Helsinki

=== France ===
- Château de Montsoreau-Museum of Contemporary Art, Montsoreau
- Lille Métropole Museum of Modern, Contemporary and Outsider Art, Villeneuve d'Ascq
- Musée d'Orsay, Paris
- Musée d'Art Moderne de la Ville de Paris, Paris
- Musée National d'Art Moderne, Paris
- Musée Picasso, Paris
- Museum of Modern and Contemporary Art, Strasbourg
- Musée d'art moderne de Troyes

=== Germany ===
- Berggruen Museum, Berlin
- Degenerate Art exhibition, a touring exhibition of modern art held in Nazi Germany to condemn modern art
- documenta, Kassel, an exhibition of modern and contemporary art held every 5 years
- Museum Ludwig, Cologne
- Pinakothek der Moderne, Munich

=== India ===
- National Gallery of Modern Art, New Delhi
- National Gallery of Modern Art, Mumbai
- National Gallery of Modern Art, Bangalore

=== Iran ===
- Museum of Contemporary Art, Tehran

=== Ireland ===
- Hugh Lane Gallery, Dublin
- Irish Museum of Modern Art, Dublin

=== Israel ===
- Tel Aviv Museum of Art

=== Italy ===
- Palazzo delle Esposizioni
- Galleria Nazionale d'Arte Moderna
- Venice Biennial, Venice
- Palazzo Pitti, Florence
- Museo del Novecento, Milan

=== Mexico ===
- Museo de Arte Moderno, México D.F.

=== Netherlands ===
- Van Gogh Museum, Amsterdam
- Stedelijk Museum, Amsterdam
- Kunstmuseum, The Hague

=== Norway ===
- Astrup Fearnley Museum of Modern Art, Oslo
- Henie-Onstad Art Centre, Oslo

=== Poland ===
- Museum of Art, Łódź
- National Museum, Kraków
- National Museum, Warsaw

=== Qatar ===
- Mathaf: Arab Museum of Modern Art, Doha

=== Romania ===
- National Museum of Contemporary Art, Bucharest

=== Russia ===
- Hermitage Museum, Saint Petersburg
- Pushkin Museum, Moscow
- Tretyakov Gallery, Moscow

=== Serbia ===
- Museum of Contemporary Art, Belgrade

=== Spain ===
- Museu d'Art Contemporani de Barcelona, Barcelona
- Museo Nacional Centro de Arte Reina Sofía, Madrid
- Thyssen-Bornemisza Museum, Madrid
- Institut Valencià d'Art Modern, Valencia
- Atlantic Center of Modern Art, Las Palmas de Gran Canaria
- Museu Picasso, Barcelona.
- Museo Picasso Málaga, Málaga.

=== Sweden ===
- Moderna Museet, Stockholm

=== Taiwan ===
- Asia Museum of Modern Art, Taichung

=== United Kingdom ===
- Estorick Collection of Modern Italian Art, London
- Saatchi Gallery, London
- Tate Britain, London
- Tate Liverpool
- Tate Modern, London
- Tate St Ives

=== Ukraine ===
- National Art Museum of Ukraine, Kyiv
- Andrey Sheptytsky National Museum of Lviv, Lviv

=== United States ===
- Albright-Knox Art Gallery, Buffalo, New York
- Art Institute of Chicago, Chicago, Illinois
- Governor Nelson A. Rockefeller Empire State Plaza Art Collection, Albany, New York
- Guggenheim Museum, New York City, New York, and Venice, Italy; more recently in Berlin, Germany, Bilbao, Spain, and Las Vegas, Nevada
- High Museum, Atlanta, Georgia
- Los Angeles County Museum of Art, Los Angeles, California
- McNay Art Museum, San Antonio, Texas
- Menil Collection, Houston, Texas
- Museum of Fine Arts, Boston, Massachusetts
- Museum of Modern Art, New York City, New York
- San Francisco Museum of Modern Art, San Francisco, California
- The Baker Museum, Naples, Florida
- Walker Art Center, Minneapolis, Minnesota
- Whitney Museum of American Art, New York City, New York

== See also ==
- 20th-century art
- Art manifesto
- Gesamtkunstwerk
- History of painting
- List of 20th-century women artists
- List of modern artists
- Modern architecture
- Periods in Western art history
- Western painting

== Sources ==
- Arnason, H. Harvard; Prather, Marla (1998). History of modern art: painting, sculpture, architecture, photography (4th ed.). New York: Harry N. Abrams, Inc. ISBN 978-0-8109-3439-9. OCLC 1035593323 – via Internet Archive.
- Atkins, Robert (1997). Artspeak: A Guide to Contemporary Ideas, Movements, and Buzzwords (2nd ed.). New York: Abbeville Press Publishers. ISBN 978-0-7892-0415-8. OCLC 605278894 – via Internet Archive.
- Cahoone, Lawrence (1996). From Modernism to Postmodernism: An Anthology. Cambridge, MA: Blackwell Publishers. ISBN 978-1-55786-602-8. OCLC 1149327777 – via Internet Archive.
- "CIMA Art Gallery". Times of India Travel. 2015-06-30.
- Clement, Russell (1996). Four French Symbolists: A Sourcebook on Pierre Puvis de Chavannes, Gustave Moreau, Odilon Redon, and Maurice Denis. Westport, CN: Greenwood Press. ISBN 978-0-313-29752-6. OCLC 34191505.
- Cogniat, Raymond (1975). Pissarro. New York: Crown Publishers. ISBN 978-0-517-52477-0. OCLC 2082821.
- Corinth, Lovis; Schuster, Peter-Klaus; Vitali, Christoph; Butts, Barbara; Brauner, Lothar; Bärnreuther, Andrea (1996). Lovis Corinth. Munich; New York: Prestel. ISBN 978-3-7913-1682-6. OCLC 35280519.
- Greenberg, Clement (1982). "Modernist Painting". In Frascina, Francis; Harrison, Charles; Paul, Deirdre (eds.). Modern Art and Modernism: A Critical Anthology. In association with the Open University. London: Harper & Row. ISBN 978-0-06-318234-9. OCLC 297414909 – via Internet Archive.
- Gombrich, Ernst H. (1995). The Story of Art. London: Phaidon Press Limited. ISBN 978-0-7148-3355-2. OCLC 1151352542 – via Internet Archive.
- Jencks, Charles (1987). Post-Modernism: The New Classicism in Art and Architecture. New York: Rizzoli. ISBN 978-0-8478-0835-9. OCLC 1150952960 – via Internet Archive.
- John-Steiner, Vera (2006). "Patterns of Collaboration among Artists". Creative Collaboration. Oxford University Press. pp. 63–96. doi:10.1093/acprof:oso/9780195307702.003.0004. ISBN 978-0-19-530770-2. OCLC 5105130725, 252638637.
- Lander, David (November–December 2006). "Fifties Furniture – The Side Tav\ble as Sculpture". Shopping. American Heritage. 57 (6). American Association for State and Local History. ISSN 2161-8496. OCLC 60622066.
- Mullins, Charlotte (2006). Painting people: figure painting today. New York: D.A.P./Distributed Art Pubs. ISBN 978-1-933045-38-2. OCLC 71679906.
- Saunders, Frances Stonor (2013-06-14) [1995-10-22]. "Modern art was CIA 'weapon'". The Independent. Archived from the original on 2022-05-15.
- Scobie, Stephen (1988). "The Allure of Multiplicity: Metaphor and Metonymy in Cubism and Gertrude Stein". In Neuman, S. C.; Nadel, Ira Bruce (eds.). Gertrude Stein and the Making of Literature. London: Palgrave Macmillan. doi:10.1007/978-1-349-08541-5_7. ISBN 978-1-349-08543-9. OCLC 7323640453 – via Internet Archive.
