= Earle M. Pilgrim =

American painter

- Born: March 14, 1923; Brooklyn, NY, United States
- Died: 1976 (aged 52–53); New York City, United States

Earle Montrose Pilgrim (March 14, 1923–1976) was an American artist whose work is within the stylistic milieu of Abstract Expressionism and Figurative Expressionism. Working in the early 1950s until the mid-1970s, Pilgrim's style is characterized by figuration informed by abstraction. The artist fluctuated between epic, large-scale compositions and intimate canvases and worked with a variety of media from painting to experimental film. Pilgrim's oeuvre reflects the artist's various interests from avant-garde portraiture to the notion of the occult, which were all figured through a Modernist interest in coloration, abstraction, and expression.

== Early life ==
Born in Brooklyn, March 14, 1923 and raised at 206 Macon Street by his parents, Leon and Amy (Crane) Pilgrim; and one sister, Enid. Pilgrim describes his birth date in the following excerpt found in a sketchbook:

Mar. 14, 1923, just before the big crash, there was a big crash in front of a certain house in Brooklyn, lo ‘twas the stork bearing a 3 lb. gift for Leon and Amy Pilgrim, this 3 lb gift went through the various stages of development. When the glorious parcel had a reasonable chance of survival, Leon and Amy decided to name it (?) him (?) he (?) This last; "he" was somehow accepted, as proper usage in the British West Indies the birthplace of Both Leon and Amy.

Pilgrim was educated in the public system until the end of his second year of high school, where he was thrown out for wearing a top hat and coat at a school dance, instead of the required uniform, this event brought his father, Leon, to enroll Earle in an apprenticeship with a printmaker. On March 27, 1943, Pilgrim enlisted in the United States Army, assigned to the 477th Composite Group, for the duration of the war until he was court-martialed for refusing to defer to a white officer. While serving at Godwin Field, the Godwin Field Beacon published a poem by Earle Pilgrim and he is identified as a member of the Artists Sketch Club.

== Art career ==
When Pilgrim returned from the Army, he went to Greenwich Village and learned jewelry making by working with jeweler Sam Kramer. He studied at the Art Students League and at one point worked at Sotheby's. Allan Malcolm Morrison (1916-1968) quoted Earle Pilgrim in "Twilight for Greenwich Village," published in the Negro Digest, Volume VII, Number 3, January 1949, "Bohemians don’t fight or crusade,” said Earl Pilgrim, a gaunt, bearded youth who haunts the San Remo Cafe and relaxes in Washington Park in the late afternoon. "We go on living our lives as we want to live them. To hell with the sneers of society. We’re anti-bourgeois and we’re individualists. We don’t even like the name ’Bohemian.’ It has a bad smell.” He explained the only reason why he used the word was because his philosophy has to have a name and "Bohemian” just happens to be most convenient."

He met Lily Touma at the San Remo Cafe during this time and they eventually married.

In 1951, the Pilgrims went to Provincetown, Massachusetts. In the art colony, the Pilgrims took 393 Commercial Street as their gallery and lived in the back. Earle, studying under Henry Hensche, would paint and make jewelry, while Lily would craft dolls and hooked rugs and write for "The Advocate," an early Provincetown newspaper. Additionally, Earle taught jewelry in adult education programs authorized by the Massachusetts State Board of Education.

At his gallery, Earle showed many artists who subsequently became famous, including Allan Kaprow and Lester Johnson. Johnson, specifically, held a deep admiration for Pilgrim, saying that, "Earle Pilgrim was one [of] the first people who liked my work."

During these years Pilgrim also built up a presence in Boston, at 80 West Cedar Street in Beacon Hill and in 1954 the Pilgrim's moved to the city full-time.

It was in Boston that Pilgrim began to occupy loft spaces in which he would live and continue to sell "Jewelry Originals, Paintings, Curiosa". These spaces were visited by an assortment of counterculture figures during the day, including Timothy Leary, Alan Watts, and Ram Dass. Pilgrim related with Boston's milieu of Jazz musicians such as Sam Rivers, Tony Williams, and Herb Pomeroy as well as other writers and artists.

Pilgrim's body of work includes jewelry, printmaking, painting, collage, metal sculpture, and avant-garde filmmaking. It was in Boston that he began to experiment in film. It was also in Boston that his behavior became aberrant, with one significant event marker: a spontaneous and frantic bus trip taken from Boston to California with no advance warning.

Earle Pilgrim was later institutionalized, sometime between 1960 and 1962, according to documents in the archives. Mrs. Pilgrim wrote in a chronology of Earle Pilgrim's illness:

"Cause of breakdown unknown; could have been due to physical, mental, and/or any one of the following: 2–3 years of obsessively overworking day and night without proper rest and sustenance, painting, filming, making jewelry, running jewelry and antique shop; difficulty in making money from painting and in starting business without sufficient capital; death of father; accumulation of years of frustration in coping with racial prejudice and finding a place in society, etc."

Pilgrim was a member of a group led by John Brockman, called "Projection Film-Makers".

"In 1965, [Reverend Michael] Allen (a community figure on the Lower East Side) invited John Brockman—a young businessman with an office uptown, who was attending Theatre Genesis events in the evenings—to coordinate screenings of experimental filmmaking at the church, a well-attended series that culminated in Brockman organizing the month-long Expanded Cinema Festival in November '65 at the Filmmakers' Cinémathèque , based on an initial idea of Jonas Mekas' and featuring performances/screenings by Claes Oldenburg, Nam June Paik, Robert Rauschenberg, Carolee Schneemann, Jack Smith, Andy Warhol, La Monte Young and many others. It is worth noting that Allen issued his invitation to Brockman at a time when the City had banned so-called underground film."

During Earle Pilgrim's final years he lived in a loft with his wife Lily at 275 Church Street in New York City, above La Monte Young and Marian Zazeela. These important American artists eventually transformed the Pilgrim's loft into Dream House a minimalist sound and light installation that has been continuous for over twenty years.

Pilgrim would spend the rest of his life in and out of institutions, approximately 14–16 years, which included a VA hospital, a state mental institution near Boston, Bellevue, St. Vincent's, and Beekman.
