= Martin Jasper =

German-Ecuadorian architect

Martin Albert Jasper
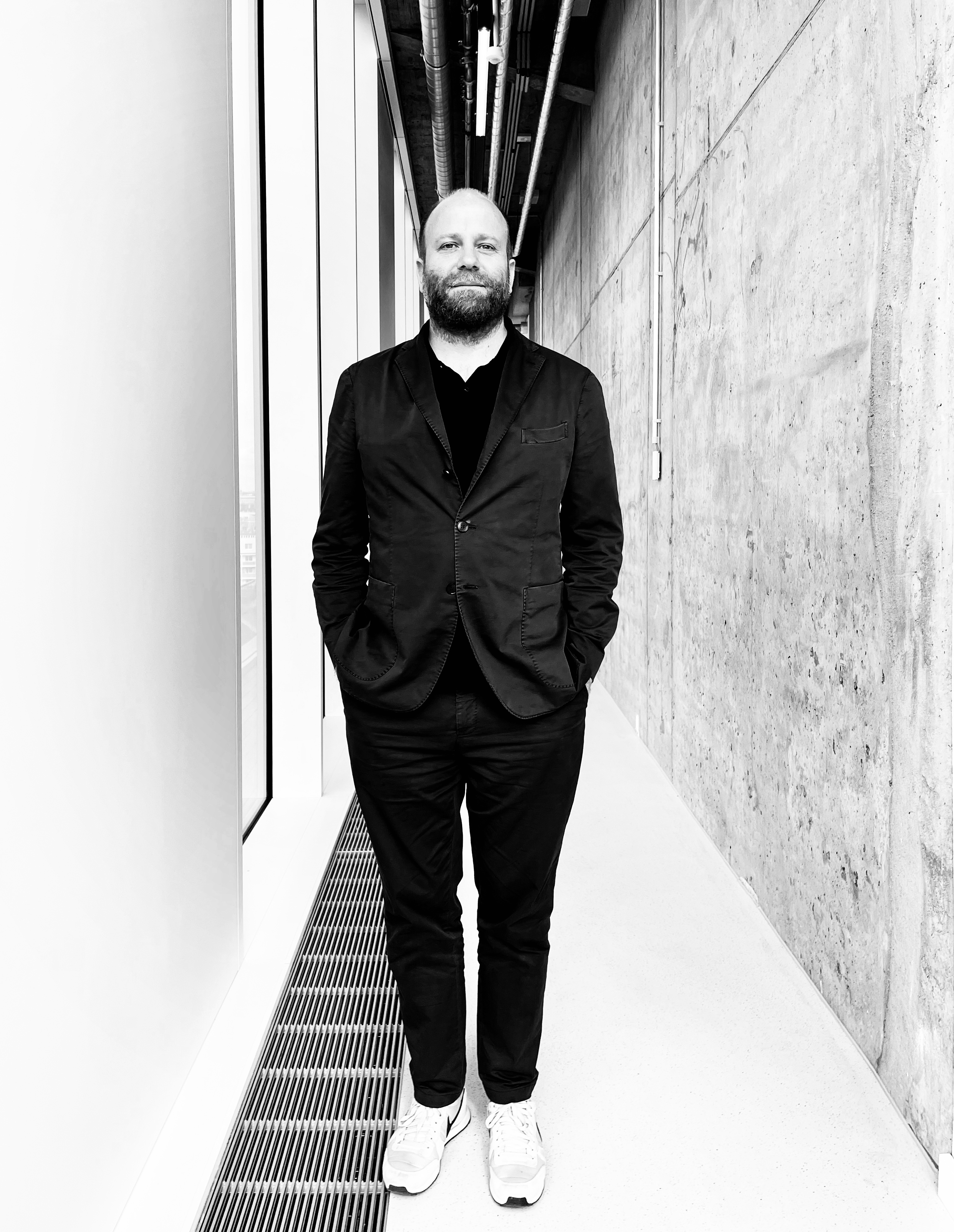
- Martin Jasper
- Born: Martin Albert Jasper; November 14, 1979; Guayaquil, Ecuador
- Education: Universität der Künste Berlin, Politecnico di Milano, Facultad de Arquitectura Universidad Católica de Valparaíso, Accademia di Belli Arti di Brera Milano
- Occupation: Architect
- Practice: Jasper Architects
- Buildings: UP! Berlin
- Website: https://jasperarchitects.com

Martin Jasper (born on November 14, 1979, in Guayaquil, Ecuador) is a German-Ecuadorian architect, founder of the architecture studio Jasper Architects, who designed the UP! Berlin building.

== Career ==
After graduating from high school in Santiago de Chile, Martin Jasper was enrolled as an assistant painter of the Ecuadorian painter Oswaldo Guayasamín in Quito, Ecuador. Jasper applied for Berlin University of the Arts (UDK) and moved to Berlin, where he won the Studienstiftung des Deutschen Volkes scholarship. He also studied at the Architecture School of the Pontifical Catholic University of Valparaiso in Chile and at the Polytechnic University of Milan.

He taught Architectural Design at the School of Architecture of the Zhengzhou University in Zhengzhou, China. He finished his academic training in fine art and painting at the Brera Academy in Milan, Italy.

Jasper worked at the architecture studio Metrogramma Associati, in Milan and at the Berlin office of English studio Foster + Partners. In 2008 he founded his own studio, Jasper Architects, based in Berlin, Buenos Aires and Vienna.

Martin Jasper obtained the German Sustainable Building Council (DGNB) certificate and has become a promoter and adviser of the DGNB around the world. The DGNB promotes the construction of economical and sustainable buildings.

In 2012, the Central Society of Architects of Argentina (SCA) presented Jasper with the First Prize for Sustainable Architecture and Urban Design for the project "Casa Eco Solar”, a self-sufficient building built in San Salvador de Jujuy.

In 2016 Jasper won the competition to transform a mall of the Centrum Warenhaus chain once in East Berlin into a smart office building named UP! Berlin. The mall was erected in 1979 next to East Berlin's Central Station (now Berlin Ostbahnhof) and the transformation was finished in 2021.
