= Lester Johnson =

Lester Johnson may refer to:

- Lester Johnson (politician) (1901–1975), U.S. Representative from Wisconsin
- Lester Johnson (artist) (1919–2010), American artist
