= H. Harvard Arnason =

American academic (1909–1986)

Hjorvardur Harvard Arnason (1909 – 1986) was an American academic, administrator, author and art historian focusing on modern art. His most enduring contribution was his survey of modern art, History of Modern Art: Painting, Sculpture, Architecture & Photography, which was first published in 1968. Now in its seventh edition, it has remained a standard volume on the modern period.

== Background ==
Arnason was born in Winnipeg, Manitoba, Canada to Icelandic immigrants, Sveinbjorn Arnason and Maria (Bjarnadottir) Arnason. He attended the University of Manitoba from 1925 to 1927, then immigrating to the United States where he attended Northwestern University, graduating in 1931. He taught at Northwestern until earning his AM degree in 1937. He continued his studies at Princeton, where he was awarded a Master of Fine Arts in 1939.

== Career ==
In New York, he worked at the Frick Collection and at Hunter College. During World War II, he was field representative in Iceland for the Office of War Information from 1942 to 1944, then was promoted to assistant deputy director for Europe, in 1944 and 1945. In 1947 he was a visiting professor at the University of Chicago, and then professor and chair of the art department at the University of Minnesota, where he remained until 1961. In Minnesota, Arnason became director of the Walker Art Center in 1951, holding that position for ten years, with a brief stint as a Carnegie Foundation visiting professor at the University of Hawaiʻi in 1959. In 1961 he returned to New York, to become vice-president for art administration at the Guggenheim Foundation, serving with Guggenheim director Thomas Messer. While at the Guggenheim, Arnason published his famous survey of modern art in 1968, A History of Modern Art, much of it drawn from his contacts and experiences with the Walker Museum. He left the Guggenheim in 1969. He wrote books about a number of modern artists.

== Personal life ==
In 1936, he married Elizabeth Hickox Yard, whose father was director of religion and a member of the department of political science at Northwestern University. Arnason was made a naturalized American citizen in 1940. He was married a second time to Elinor Lane Franklin in 1966. His daughter, the writer Eleanor Arnason, credits growing up in the company of avant-garde artists was a formative influence in her literary career. Arnason died in New York City on May 28, 1986.

== Selected works ==
- Arnason, H. Harvard. Directions in Modern Painting (G. David Thompson Collection at the Solomon R. Guggenheim Museum). New York: Solomon R. Guggenheim Museum, 1961
- Arnason, H. Harvard. Philip Guston. New York: Solomon R. Guggenheim Museum, 1962
- Arnason, H. Harvard. Marca-Relli. New York: H. N. Abrams, 1963
- Arnason, H. Harvard. History of Modern Art: Painting, Sculpture, Architecture. New York: H. N. Abrams, 1968
- Arnason, H. Harvard and Jacques Lipchitz. My Life in Sculpture New York: Viking Press, 1972
- Arnason, H. Harvard. The Sculptures of Houdon. London: Phaidon, 1975
- Arnason, H. Harvard. Robert Motherwell. New York: H. N. Abrams, 1977
- Arnason, H. Harvard. 1998. History of Modern Art: Painting, Sculpture, Architecture, Photography. Fourth Edition, rev. by Marla F. Prather, after the third edition, revised by Daniel Wheeler. New York: Harry N. Abrams, Inc. ISBN 0-8109-3439-6; Upper Saddle River, New Jersey: Prentice-Hall. ISBN 0-13-183313-8; London: Thames & Hudson. ISBN 0-500-23757-3 [Fifth edition, revised by Peter Kalb, Upper Saddle River, New Jersey: Prentice Hall; London: Pearson/Prentice Hall, 2004. ISBN 0-13-184069-X]
