= Bob Thompson (painter) =

American painter (1937–1966)

- Bob Thompson in the garden of the Martha Jackson Gallery, New York, 1965
- Born: Robert Louis Thompson; June 26, 1937; Louisville, Kentucky, US
- Died: May 30, 1966; Rome, Italy
- Occupation: Figurative painter

Bob Thompson (June 26, 1937 – May 30, 1966) was an African-American figurative painter known for his bold and colorful canvases, whose compositions were influenced by the Old Masters. His art has also been described as synthesizing Baroque and Renaissance masterpieces with the jazz-influenced Abstract Expressionist movement.

He was prolific in his eight-year career, producing more than 1,000 works before his death in Rome in 1966. The Whitney Museum mounted a retrospective of his work in 1998. He also has works in numerous private and public collections throughout the United States.

== Early life ==
Robert Louis Thompson was born in Louisville, Kentucky, into a middle-class family, the youngest of three children. He had two older sisters, Cecile and Phyllis. His mother was a school teacher, his father owned a start-up dry cleaning business.

Shortly after he was born, the family moved to Elizabethtown, Kentucky, where his father worked for a dry-cleaning business, eventually opening his own business. Thompson's father discouraged him from associating with lower-income black families. As a result, both he and his two sisters grew up relatively socially isolated.

His father, who had expanded his dry-cleaning business to a second location, died when his delivery truck he was driving crashed. Thompson, just 13, returned to Louisville to live with his older sister, Cecile, and her husband, who exposed him to art and jazz.

Thompson became a pre-med student at Boston University (1955–56), but dropped out after a semester and returned to the University of Louisville (1957–58), where he studied painting. Among his instructors were German expressionist artist Ulfert Wilke, American surrealist painter Mary Spencer Nay, and German painter and stained glass maker Charles Crodel, who was a visiting professor at the time. Especially influential were the two courses Thompson took with Dario Covi that included Renaissance art and the life drawing class he took with Eugene Leake.

In 1958, Nay suggested that Thompson spend the summer in the Cape Cod artists' community in Provincetown, MA. While there, Thompson studied at the Seong Moy Art School and met the multimedia artist Red Grooms and the painter, Dody Müller, the widow of Jan Müller whose figurative and expressionist paintings Thompson admired.

Thompson married Carol Plenda in December 1960. She supported his talent and tried to work through several problems throughout their marriage, mostly Thompson's drug use.

== Career ==
Following his summer in Provincetown, Thompson moved to New York City, where, in addition to deepening his connection to the New York artists he'd met on the Cape, he formed friendships with jazz musicians such as Charlie Haden and Ornette Coleman while a regular at the jazz clubs, such as The Five Spot and the Slugs' Saloon. He also formed friendships with writers Allen Ginsberg and LeRoi Jones as well as to fellow artists Lester Johnson, Mimi Gross, Marcia Marcus and Allan Kaprow, with whom he participated in some of the earliest Happenings organized by Grooms.

Thompson had his first solo exhibition in 1960 at the Delancy Street Museum and later at the Martha Jackson Gallery where he had solo exhibitions in 1963–64, and 1965. Thompson exhibited at the Donald Morris Gallery in Detroit in 1965, which created significant interest in his work among local collectors. In 1968, The New School organized a solo exhibition of his work, as did the Speed Art Museum in 1971.

== Personal life and death ==
During Thompson's career in the late 1950s to the 1960s, his artistic career allowed him many new opportunities such as parties and events which were not possible for people in his position, however, Thompson was soon addicted to using heroin, which later formed into full addiction which caused tragic events in Thompson's life and mental health.

In 1961 Thompson received a Whitney Foundation fellowship, allowing him and his wife to move to Europe. They went to London, Paris (staying at the so-called "Beat Museum" hotel) and to Spain, where they settled in Ibiza. Thompson wanted to draw inspiration from the European Old Masters, and perhaps also wanted to escape drugs. However, his drug use took its toll. He died from a heroin overdose following gall bladder surgery in Rome, Italy in 1966. While Thompson had a relatively short career before his early death, he still managed to complete about 1,000 paintings and drawings.

== Artistic style ==
The Spinning, Spinning, Turning, Directing (1963) at the Smithsonian American Art Museum in 2023

Although, as a figurative painter, Thompson ran against the trend of Abstract Expressionism that dominated art at the time, he drew inspiration from the bold energy of Abstract Expressionist works. As a student and early in his career, immersed himself in the art of earlier eras, from the Renaissance and Baroque onward. One of his recurrent themes was the reinterpretation of subjects from the Old Masters, synthesizing masterpieces of the past with his interest and engagement with contemporary culture, including jazz, poetry and the arts.

In his early career, he typically painted large groups of figures in mainly earth tones. By 1963, his focus shifted towards painting single, central events in brighter colors. He began to paint more expressively, combining traditional symbols and themes with his own imagination. Thematically, Thompson was inspired by the dichotomy of good and evil as well as the relationship between men and nature. His figures are often multi-colored and flat and reflect many of the basic elements of the Abstract Expressionist movement.

Though not as directly active in the civil rights movement as some Black artists of the 1960s, Thompson's close friendships and associations with the cultural figures and themes of the era found bold expression in his painting. His 1961 painting "L'Execution" depicts a lynching, explicitly referencing the violent, racist resistance to civil rights, while also paying homage to Piero della Francesca's Flagellation of Christ. Thompson honored Black artists and institutions with his 1964 portrait of his long-time friend, poet, writer and playwright, LeRoi Jones ("LeRoi Jones and Family"); "The Hairdresser" (1962–63); "The Beauty Parlor (1963); and "Homage to Nina Simone ", a piece dedicated to the singer and civil rights activist, whom he admired and befriended in the summer of 1965. This work, painted that year, is among the final dozen major paintings Thompson completed before his death in 1966.

== Legacy ==
Long considered a "painter's painter," Thompson's work has steadily gained in recognition since his death. The 1998 exhibition of Thompson's work, curated by Thelma Golden at the Whitney Museum of American Art did much to bring his artistic achievement to the attention of wider audience.

In her review of the show for The New York Times, critic Roberta Smith wrote of the paintings, drawings and gouaches and other works: "Altogether they convey a sense of headlong momentum, of a smart young man in a hurry, in love with painting and its history, with the possibilities of contemporary art and with life itself."
