= Oswaldo Guayasamín =

Ecuadorian painter

- Guayasamín on a 1956 cover of Mundo Hispánico
- Born: Oswaldo Guayasamín Calero; July 6, 1919; Quito, Ecuador
- Died: March 10, 1999 (aged 79); Baltimore, Maryland, U.S.
- Notable work: Los niños muertos, Manos de protesta
- Movement: Shaking
- Awards: Premio Eugenio Espejo (1991)

Oswaldo Guayasamín Calero (July 6, 1919 – March 10, 1999) was an Ecuadorian painter and sculptor of Kichwa and Mestizo heritage.

== Biography ==
=== Early life ===
Guayasamín was born in Quito, Ecuador, to a native father and a Mestiza mother, both of Kichwa descent. His family was poor and his father worked as a carpenter for most of his life. Oswaldo Guayasamín later worked as a taxi and truck driver. He was the eldest of ten children in his family. When he was young, he enjoyed drawing caricatures of his teachers and the children that he played with. He showed an early love for art. He created a Pan-American art of human and social inequalities which achieved international recognition.

He graduated from the School of Fine Arts in Quito as a painter and sculptor. He also studied architecture there. He held his first exhibition when he was 23, in 1942. While he was attending college, his best friend died during a demonstration in Quito. This incident would later inspire one of his paintings, Los Niños Muertos (The Dead Children). This event also helped him to form his vision about the people and the society that he lived in.

=== Career ===
Guayasamín started painting from the time he was six years old. He loved to draw from that age. Starting from watercolors and transforming all the way through to his signature humanity pieces, his art career had many highlights. Although tragedy molded Guayasamín's work, it was his friend's death that inspired him to paint powerful symbols of truth in society and injustices around him. While his interest was seldom with his school work, he began selling his art before the time that he could even read. After his attendance at the School of Fine Arts in Quito, his career took off.

La Galería Caspicara, an art gallery opened by Eduardo Kingman in 1940, was one of the first places that Guayasamín was featured. His themes of oppression in the lower social classes allowed him to stand out and gain more recognition. El Silencio in particular, was a painting from this showcase that stood out. It marks a shift in Guayasamín's work from storytelling to focusing on his subjects symbolizing all human suffering.

Guayasamín met José Clemente Orozco while traveling in the United States of America and Mexico from 1942 to 1943. They traveled together to many of the diverse countries in South America. They visited Peru, Brazil, Chile, Argentina, Uruguay, and other countries. Through these travels, he observed more of the indigenous lifestyle and poverty that appeared in his paintings.

Oswaldo Guayasamín won first prize at the Ecuadorian Salón Nacional de Acuarelistas y Dibujantes in 1948. He also won the first prize at the Third Hispano-American Biennial of Art in Barcelona in 1955. In 1957, at the Fourth Biennial of São Paulo, he was named the best South American painter.

In 1988, the Congress of Ecuador asked Guayasamín to paint a mural depicting the history of Ecuador. Due to its controversial nature, the United States government criticized him because one of the figures in the painting shows a figure in a German military helmet, implying a Nazi soldier, with the lettering "CIA" on it.

The artist's last exhibits were inaugurated by him personally in the Luxembourg Palace in Paris, and in the Palais de Glace in Buenos Aires in 1995. In Quito, Guayasamín built a museum that features his work. His images capture the political oppression, racism, poverty, Latin American lifestyle, and class division found in much of South America.

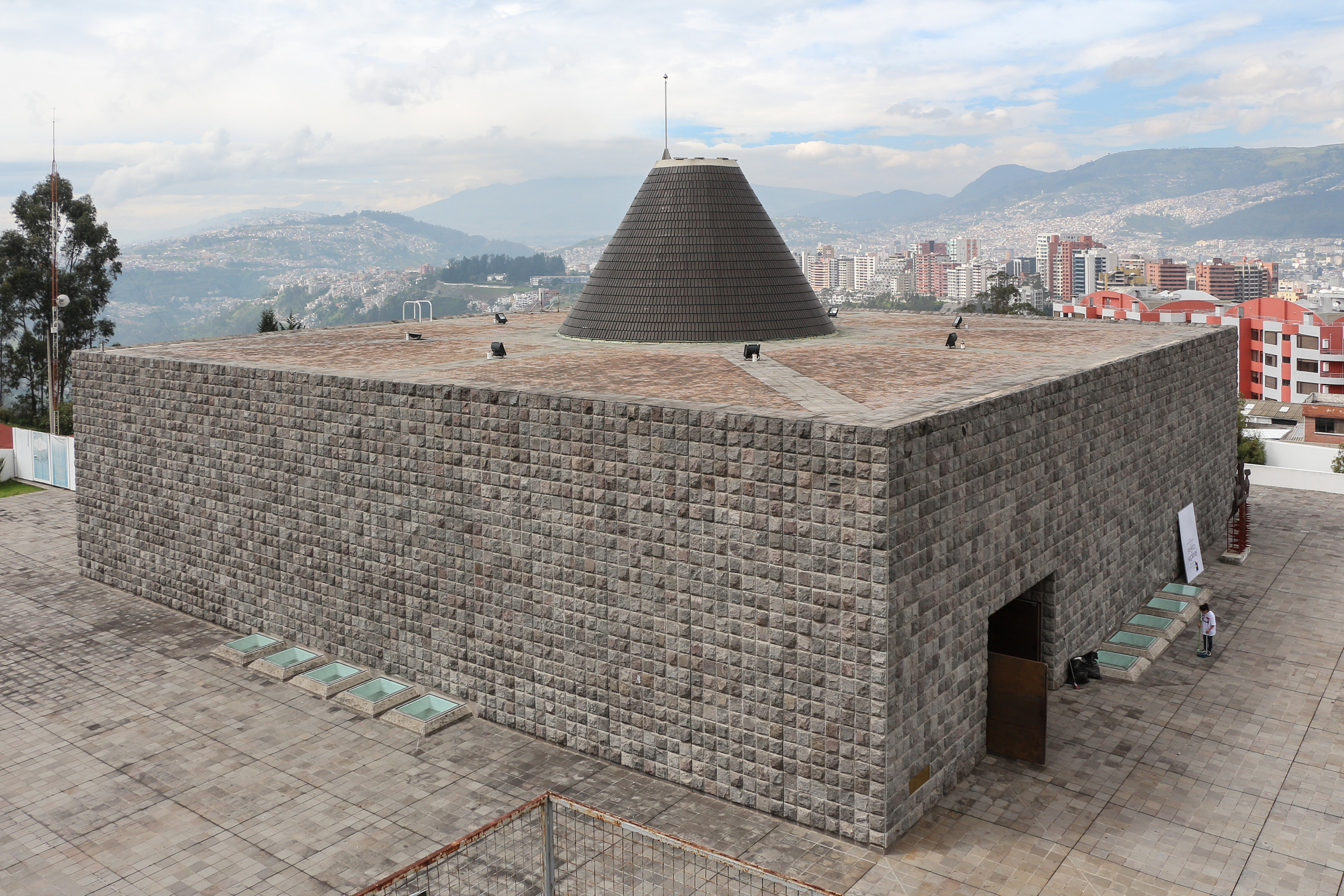
La Capilla del Hombre in Quito

Guayasamín dedicated his life to painting, sculpting and collecting. He was an ardent supporter of the communist Cuban Revolution in general and Fidel Castro in particular. He was given a prize for "an entire life of work for peace" by UNESCO. His death on March 10, 1999, was considered a great loss to Ecuador and occurred in the midst of a political and socioeconomic crisis, with the day marked by strikes by the indigenous people (whom he spent his life supporting) and other sectors of society. Guayasamín himself suffered personally in the last months of his life, after his 27-year-old grand-daughter Maita Madriñan Guayasamín, her 4-year-old daughter Alejandra and her 4-month-old son Martín (both Guayasamín's great-grandchildren) were killed in the crash of Cubana de Aviación Flight 389 in Quito in August 1998

He is still lauded as a national treasure and has been likened to the Michelangelo of Latin America by the Spanish art historian José Camón Aznar. In 2002, three years after his death, a building co-designed by Guayasamín, La Capilla del Hombre ("The Chapel of Man"), was completed and opened to the public. The Chapel is meant to document not only man's cruelty to man but also the potential for greatness within humanity. It is co-located with Guayasamín's home in the hills overlooking Quito.
