= La Capilla del Hombre =

Art museum in Quito, Ecuador

Coordinates: 0.1908°S 78.4695°W

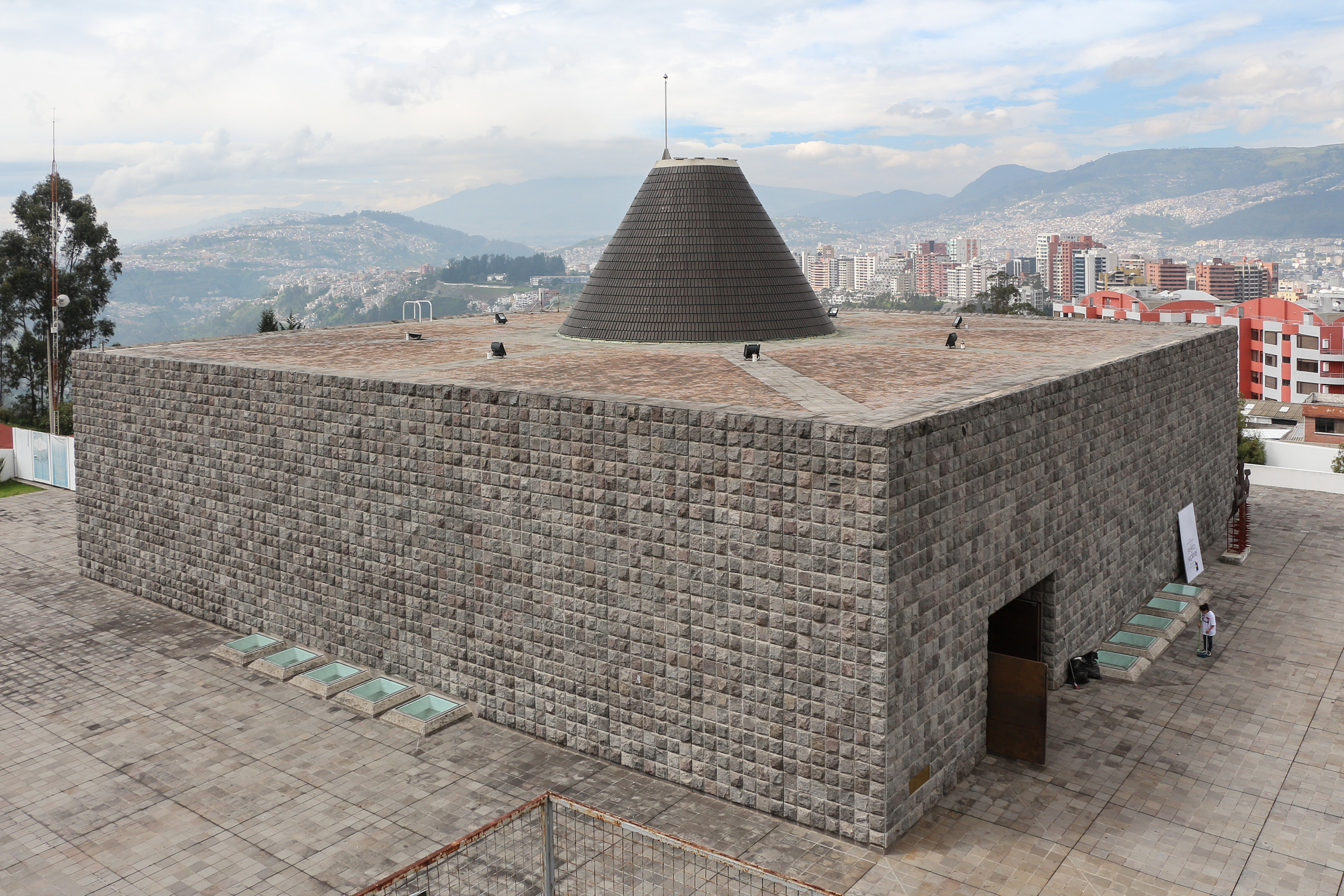
La Capilla del Hombre in Quito

The painter Oswaldo Guayasamín's La Capilla del Hombre ("The Chapel of Man") occupies a site in Bellavista overlooking the city of Quito, Ecuador. The Capilla is a purpose-built art museum dedicated to the peoples of Latin America. Construction of Guayasamín's masterpiece began in 1995 and unfortunately was not completed until 2002, after his death.

Although this chapel contains fewer pieces of Guayasamín's art than the nearby foundation and museum, the building provides an atmosphere specific to his artwork to view his paintings. The Capilla del Hombre exhibits Guayasamín's work as a history of human suffering and violence in Latin America and the world. It includes sculptures and murals and integrates the surroundings into an artistic interpretation of the subject. The building was co-designed by Oswaldo Guayasamín and Handel Guayasamín.
