= Lester Johnson (artist) =

American artist and educator

- Born: January 27, 1919; Minneapolis, Minnesota, U.S.
- Died: May 30, 2010 (aged 91); Westhampton, New York, U.S.
- Occupations: Artist, educator
- Known for: Figurative expressionism; human figure painting
- Movement: Second Generation of the New York School

Lester Johnson (January 27, 1919 – May 30, 2010) was an American artist and educator. Johnson was a member of the Second Generation of the New York School during the late 1950s. The subject of much of his work is the human figure. His style is considered by critics and art historians to be in the figurative expressionist mode.

== Biography ==
Lester Johnson was born in 1919 in Minneapolis, Minnesota. From 1942 to 1947, he attended the Minneapolis School of Art, where he studied under Alexander Masley and Cameron Booth, both former students of Hans Hofmann at the Hofmann school in Munich, Germany.

Johnson moved to New York City in 1947. His first studio and apartment was on 6th Street and Avenue A, next door to the painter Wolf Kahn. His next residence and workspace was a loft on St. Marks Place that he shared with artists Larry Rivers and Jim Fosberg.

In 1949, Johnson married Josephine Valenti, an art historian, and moved into a house on 2nd Ave and 2nd Street, which the couple shared with Kahn.

During the early 1950s, Johnson became associated with the Hansa Gallery Group, the 10th Street Gallery Co-op Movement, and the 8th Street artist's club. In 1954 Johnson hitchhiked to Provincetown, Massachusetts. There he joined contemporaries like Kahn, Jan Müller, Gandy Brodie, and Bob Thompson; spending the summer painting and exhibiting in the vibrant coastal arts community.

In 1954, Johnson and Valenti bought a summer house on Old Stone Highway in East Hampton, New York. In 1961, Johnson briefly left the city for an artist-in-residence position at Ohio State University. Upon returning to New York City, Johnson shared a studio with the painter Philip Pearlstein.

In 1964, Johnson was invited by Abstract Expressionist painter Jack Tworkov to teach at Yale, where he served as the Director of Studies Graduate Painting from 1969 to 1974. Johnson retired from teaching at the Yale School of Art and Architecture in 1989.

Johnson died on May 30, 2010, at the age of 91.

== Artwork ==
Johnson's early paintings were in the vein of Abstract Expressionism. In 1954, he began to focus on the figure, rendered in a style that reflected the spontaneous and dynamic mode of action painting. The city and its citizens played an important influence on Johnson's work. His first notable series in the mode of action painting where profiles and frontal depictions of unspecified human heads. His next significant series of paintings depict men, often in suits and bowler hats, in crowded street scenes. Johnson manifested these images as monochrome silhouettes, almost blending into the background as if these anonymous figures were ingrained within the landscape. Later on, Johnson's crowds included women and a more diverse palette and details. The figures were less anonymous and full of color and stylistic motifs, such as dresses with prints and T-shirts with logos.

The painter Paul Resika, notes that Johnson's work, "had a Leger-like simplicity and strength; something of Balla’s futurist movement. Lester Johnson was one of the first post-war painters, raised in 'modernism,' to paint the figure. It was human content he said, that he was after."

In March 1961, ARTnews published an article with text by critic Lawrence Campbell and photographs by Robert Frank titled "Lester Johnson Paints a Picture." The article was part of a series showing the process of artists working in their studio (it began in 1953 with the piece "de Kooning Paints a Picture"). Johnson tells Campbell about his process of creating a painting: “It is as though I had fought my way out from behind my own personality, and was able at last to expand and express myself in a completely fresh way. When the painting is finished, I realize I can never repeat it. It came from a moment of absolute freedom. The moment came when I was able to set down a statement in paint which was the sum of the statements that preceded it.”

== Exhibitions ==
In Provincetown, Johnson had solo and group shows at the Sun Gallery and HCE Gallery. In New York, Johnson exhibited at the Martha Jackson Gallery, Zabriskie Gallery, Gimpel & Weitzenhoffer, and James Goodman Gallery. He has also been exhibited at several museums, including group shows at the Solomon R. Guggenheim Museum, The Whitney Museum, Metropolitan Museum of Art, and the Provincetown Art Association and Museum. He was elected a member to both the American Academy of Arts & Letters and National Academy of Design. Throughout his career, Lester exhibited extensively with Donald Morris Gallery in Detroit, Michigan and with David Klein Gallery in Birmingham, Michigan.

== Awards and prizes ==
- 2004 Elected Member, American Academy of Arts and Letters
- 2003 American Academy of Arts and Letters, Jimmy Ernst Award
- 1987 Elected Associate, National Academy of Design
- 1987 Brandeis University, Creative Arts Award for Painting
- 1973 Guggenheim Fellowship
- 1961 Longview Fellowship Massachusetts Institute of Technology
- 1942 Midwestern Artists Competition 1st prize
- 1941 St. Paul Gallery Scholarship
- 1940–41 The President’s Scholarship Minneapolis School of Fine Arts
- 1939 Alfred Pillsbury Scholarship

== Selected public collections ==
- Baltimore Museum of Art, Baltimore, MD
- Albright-Knox Art Gallery, Buffalo, NY
- Fogg Art Museum, Harvard University, Cambridge, MA
- Art Institute of Chicago, Chicago, IL
- Detroit Institute of Arts, Detroit, MI
- Kalamazoo Institute of Arts, Kalamazoo, MI
- Modern Art Museum of Fort Worth, Fort Worth, TX
- Wadsworth Atheneum, Hartford, CT
- Minneapolis Institute of Arts, Minneapolis, MN
- The Walker Art Center, Minneapolis, MN
- Yale University Art Gallery, New Haven, CT
- Museum of Modern Art, New York, NY
- Metropolitan Museum of Art, New York, NY
- Whitney Museum of American Art, New York, NY
- Solomon R. Guggenheim Museum, New York, NY
- Chrysler Museum of Art, Norfolk, VA
- The Provincetown Art Association and Museum, Provincetown, MA
- Carnegie Museum of Art, Pittsburgh, PA
- Museum of Art, Rhode Island School of Design, Providence, RI
- Aldrich Contemporary Art Museum, Ridgefield, CT
- Rose Art Museum, Brandeis University, Waltham, MA
- Hirshhorn Museum and Sculpture Garden, Washington, DC.
- Smithsonian American Art Museum, Washington, DC.

== Suggested reading ==
- Sandler, Irving H. The New York School: The Painters and Sculptors of the Fifties, New York: Harper & Row, 1978. ISBN 0-06-438505-1
- Schimmel, Paul and Stein, Judith E., The Figurative fifties: New York figurative expressionism: New York: Rizzoli, 1988. ISBN 0-8478-0942-0
