= Jan Müller (artist) =

German-American painter (1922–1958)

- Born: December 27, 1922; Hamburg, Germany
- Died: January 29, 1958 (aged 35); New York City, U.S.
- Occupations: Abstract expressionist painter; New York Figurative Expressionist painter

Jan Müller (December 27, 1922 – January 29, 1958) was a New York-based figurative expressionist artist of the 1950s. According to art critic Carter Ratcliff, "His paintings usually erect a visual architecture sturdy enough to support an array of standing, riding, levitating figures. Gravity is absent, banished by an indifference to ordinary experience." According to the poet John Ashbery, Müller "brings a medieval sensibility to neo-Expressionist paintings."

== Biography ==
Jan Müller was born on December 27, 1922, in Hamburg, Germany. In 1933 his family fled the Nazis to Prague, and later to Bex-les-Bains, Switzerland; there he experienced the first of several attacks of rheumatic fever. He visited Paris in 1938 and two years later was apprehended and interned in a camp near Lyon. Shortly after the fall of Paris, Müller was released, at which time he moved to Ornaisons, near Narbonne. Following an unsuccessful attempt to escape to the United States from Marseille, he was able to cross the border into Spain in 1941 and proceed via Portugal to New York.

Jan Müller began to study art in 1945.

- The Art Students League of New York, New York City, for six months
- Hans Hofmann School of Fine Arts for five years

He became a US citizen in 1957.

Jan Müller died on January 29, 1958, at the age of thirty-five, in New York.

== Selected solo exhibitions ==
- 1953, 1954, 1955, 1956, 1957, 1958: Cooperative Hansa Gallery, New York City, which he founded with Allan Kaprow and Richard Stankiewicz
- 1955, 1956: The Sun Gallery, Provincetown, Massachusetts
- 1960: University of Minnesota
- 1961: Zabriskie Gallery, NYC
- 1962: Jan Müller: 1922–1958 organized by the Solomon R. Guggenheim Museum, NYC
- 1970, 1971, 1972: Noah Goldowsky
- 1976, 1977: Gruenebaum Gallery, NYC
- 1980: Rosa Esman Gallery, NYC

== Selected group exhibitions ==
- 1952: 813 Broadway (Gallery), NYC
- 1953: The Art Institute of Chicago
- 1955: University of Minnesota
- 1955, 1956: Stable Show, Annual Exhibition of Painting and Sculpture, Stable Gallery, NYC
- 1957: The New York School, Second Generation, Jewish Museum, NYC; Young America, Whitney Museum of American Art, NYC
- 1958: Carnegie, Pittsburgh, Pennsylvania; Festival of Two Worlds, Spoleto, Perugia, Italy
- 1958, 1959: Institute of Contemporary Art, Boston, MA
- 1959: New Images of Man, Museum of Modern Art, NYC
- 1960: American Federation of Arts, circ., NYC
- 2009: Days Lumberyard Studios, Provincetown, MA, 1915-1972, ACME Fine Art, Boston, MA;

== Collections ==
- Mint Museum of Art, Charlotte, North Carolina
- Museum of Modern Art, NYC
- Newark Museum, Newark, New Jersey
- Chrysler Museum of Art, Norfolk, VA

== See also ==
- New York School
- Action painting

== Books ==
- Paul Schimmel and Judith E Stein, The Figurative fifties : New York figurative expressionism, (Newport Beach, Calif. : Newport Harbor Art Museum : New York : Rizzoli, 1988.) ISBN 978-0-8478-0942-4 ISBN 978-0-91749312-6
- Barbara Rose, American Art Since 1900; a critical history. (New York, F. A. Praeger, 1967.) OCLC: 256107 p. 236, repr., 237
- Irving Sandler, The New York School: The Painters and Sculptors of the Fifties, (New York, Harper & Row, 1978.) ISBN 0-06-438505-1, ISBN 978-0-06-438505-3 p. 124, fig. 86
- Marika Herskovic, New York School Abstract Expressionists Artists Choice by Artists, (New York School Press, 2000.) ISBN 0-9677994-0-6 pp. 32,38
- Marika Herskovic, American Abstract and Figurative Expressionism: Style Is Timely Art Is Timeless: An Illustrated Survey With Artists' Statements, Artwork and Biographies. (New York School Press, 2009.) ISBN 978-0-9677994-2-1. p. 172-175
