= City Gallery (Manhattan) =

Art gallery in New York City

Coordinates: 40.744°N 73.991°W

City Gallery was an art gallery in New York City that exhibited the work of contemporary artists in a loft space that was run collectively by a group of young avant-garde artists.

== History ==
In November 1958, artists Red Grooms and Jay Milder, founded the City Gallery inside of Grooms' third-floor walk-up inside of a Flatiron Loft, which was located at 735 Sixth Avenue (the northwest corner of Twenty-Forth street). The loft was around twenty feet by forty feet and was primarily being used as a Grooms' studio.

Grooms and Milder were previously part of the Phoenix Gallery, a cooperative art gallery founded during the 10th Street gallery boom. When Phoenix Gallery declined to show Claes Oldenburg's work, Grooms and Milder dropped out of Phoenix and City Gallery organized Oldenberg's first New York City exhibition.

The City Gallery gallery ceased operations in May 1959 when Grooms left the city for the summer. After Grooms returned to New York in the fall, he moved downtown to Delancey Street and subsequently founded the Delancey Street Museum, which featured many of the same artists exhibited at City Gallery, and also presented some of the first 'Happenings.' The building that housed City Gallery was demolished soon after the Grooms moved out.

== Exhibitions ==
In addition to Oldenberg's solo New York debut, City Gallery also presented Jim Dine's inaugural New York City exhibition. Other artists who showed at City Gallery included Mica Nava (née Michaela Weisselberg), Chris Lane, Gandy Brodie, Sari Dienes, Jackie Ferrara, Stephen Durkee, Mimi Gross, Bob Thompson, Lester Johnson, Robert Beauchamp, George Nelson Preston, Joan Herbst, Peter Passuntino, Budd Hopkins, Emily Mason, Wolf Kahn, and Alex Katz. Milder and Grooms also exhibited their work in group shows with their peers. In an interview with art historian, Judith Stein, Grooms recalls, "We were reacting to Tenth Street. In '58 and '59, Tenth Street was sort of like SoHo is now, and it was getting all the lively attention of everyone downtown....We were just kids in our twenties..and had a flair for attracting people to our openings."
