= Jay Milder =

American painter (1934–2026)

Jay Milder (May 12, 1934 – May 27, 2026) was an American artist and a figurative expressionist painter of the second generation New York School.

Themes from the Hebrew Bible such as Jacob's Ladder and Noah's Ark, and the esoteric mystical beliefs of the Kabbalah, are recurring themes in Milder's paintings, presented as archetypal images that recur in the basic karma, make-up, and need of human nature.

Milder's work has been internationally exhibited and is included in the collections of many museums. He has been the subject of several retrospectives in Brazil. The first was in 2006, at the Museum of Modern Art, in Rio de Janeiro and the second, in 2007 at the National Museum Brasilia. Milder is renowned in São Paulo, one of the major international centers for street and public art, as a seminal influence on graffiti artists.

== Life and career ==
Jay Milder was born in Omaha, Nebraska, on May 12, 1934. His grandparents, who came from Ukraine, were descendants of the Hasidic mystic, Rabbi Nachman. As he listened to family stories his interest in spiritualism and mysticism increased, and became an important influence on his philosophy of life and art. Later, when he arrived in New York, he was drawn to the Theosophical Society and the teaching of Helena Blavatsky.

He graduated from Omaha Central High School in 1952. In late 1953, he traveled to Europe where he studied painting with André L'Hote, and sculpture with Ossip Zadkine. He also spent a lot of time studying art at the Louvre Museum, and at the studio of Stanley Hayter. During Milder's time in Paris, the paintings of the Jewish painter Chaïm Soutine, became a primary influence on his own paintings and sculptures.

Milder returned to the United States in 1956, and he began studying painting at the Chicago Art Institute. His drawing teacher, Isabel McKinnen, introduced him to the compositional theories of the Abstract Expressionists, notably, the push/pull method originated by Hans Hofmann of creating spatial value and depth through abstract forms and color arrangement. During his time as a student in Chicago, Milder exhibited with the Momentum Group, an alliance of emerging artists who were particularly dedicated to the progression of figurative art and its global origins. In 1957, Milder spent the summer in Mexico where he exhibited in Puebla and received the Mexican Government's Honor Award for artists. Back in the United States, Milder and his family moved to New Dorp Beach in Staten Island, in order to raise his daughters without fear of eviction. He created a studio in the abandoned concrete seaside hospital of the St. John's Guild where he could produce long paintings in its wings and host parties for friends from the city.

In the summer of 1958, Milder studied with Hans Hofmann in Provincetown, Massachusetts. He exhibited his work at the Sun Gallery, with his contemporaries, including Mary Frank, Red Grooms, Bob Thompson, Lester Johnson, Emilio Cruz, and Alex Katz, among others. During this period his painting began to incorporate iconography of birds, animals, humans, and animal/human hybrids. That same year, Milder, Bob Thompson, and Red Grooms, founded the City Gallery in the Chelsea section of New York City. The gallery moved downtown and became the Delancey Street Museum and an early site for 'Happenings', which Milder participated in. He showed his first major series called "Subway Runners" in 1964 at the Martha Jackson Gallery in New York City.

During the 1970s, Milder co-founded a collective group called Rhino Horn with Peter Passuntino, Peter Dean, Benny Andrews, Nicholas Sperakis, Michael Fauerbach, Ken Bowman, Leonel Gongora, and Bill Barrell. Rhino Horn continued a style promoting politically and socially driven American Figurative Expressionism, when many people in the art world and society were focused on Pop Art and Minimalism.

Milder's art has been the subject of two retrospectives in Brazil in 2007 at the National Museum Brasilia and, in 2006, at the Museum of Modern Art, in Rio de Janeiro. In Summer of 2009 he was in Brazil where at this time he painted a commissioned mural alongside Brazilian street artist, Eduardo Kobra in São Paulo.

Milder died from a stroke on May 27, 2026, at the age of 92.

== Artwork ==
Milder's paintings underwent various stylistic changes since the 1950s. The most common and important consistency is his organic form of Expressionism. Biblical references always play an important role in Milder's work. From Milder's perspective, the Kabbalah underlies all aspects of reality including not only the way a painting is conceived and executed, but also its impact on the visual environment around us. In a 1976 article in Arts magazine titled, “Jay Milder: Painter of Discovery, Resolution and Rediscovery,” historian George Nelson Preston contextualized Milder's artistic process as “trance-like,” and labeled him “an important painter's painter and … an historian's painter.”

His first notable series of paintings are his "Subway Runners," "Subway Faces," and "Subway People," which are stylized representations of human figures within an environment that references the New York City subway system. Milder painted in these figures in such a heavy impasto that they often protrude out off of the canvas. While the "Subway Faces" and "Subway People" depict clusters of figures alluding to riders packed into subway cars, the "Subway Runners" feature large solitary forms that stretch across the canvas as if they were running to catch a train.

Milder began a group of small paintings, entitled “Messiah Series”, in the late 1960s. These were fully expressionistic earth toned pictures, and he completed around 250 paintings in the series, based on biblical themes from the Old Testament. When 40 of these paintings were shown in a traveling exhibition premiering at the Richard Green Gallery in New York City, in 1987, art critic Donald Kuspit wrote in Artforum Magazine: “after Nolde's biblical pictures, these are the best and most integral group of biblical pictures in the 20th century.”

From the 1970s through the 2000s, much of Milder's artworks have been centered around interpretations of the Kabbalah, including Jewish numerology.

== Collections and awards ==
Milder's work is in the permanent collection of galleries and museums throughout the world, including The Tel-Aviv Museum of Art in Tel-Aviv, Israel, The Provincetown Art Association and Museum in Provincetown, Massachusetts, The Chrysler Museum of Art in Norfolk, Virginia, The RISD Museum in Providence, Rhode Island, and the Dayton Art Institute in Dayton, Ohio.

Milder received the Mexican Government's Honor Award for artists in 1957, a Rainbow Arts Foundation Award at Exhibition Museum, Guadalajara, Mexico. In 1965, he was honored as Professor Emeritus at City College of New York in 1991, and in 1999 he was the Cultural Exchange representative between The United States and Brazil at the Belles Artes Museum, Rio de Janeiro, Brazil.
