= John Kelly (Australian artist) =

Australian artist (born 1965)

- Born: 1965 (age 60–61); United Kingdom
- Education: RMIT
- Occupation: Artist
- Website: johnkellyartist.com

John Kelly (born 1965) is an Australian artist.

== Early life ==
Kelly was born in England in 1965. His family emigrated to Australia later the same year and settled in the Melbourne suburb of Sunshine.

In 1985, he earned a Bachelor of Arts (Visual Arts Painting) from RMIT where he also completed his Masters of Arts in 1995. As a winner of the 1995 Anne & Gordon Samstag International Visual Arts Scholarship, he travelled to London to study as an Affiliate Student at the Slade School of Art from 1996 to 1997.

== Works ==
=== Paintings – early works (Dobell's cows) ===
Kelly's interest in Australian history clashed with his idiosyncratic sense of humour and this collision created his early Dobell's Cows series (1992–1996) based on the work of the artist Sir William Dobell. Dobell and his fellow artists were commissioned to camouflage airfields during WWII, and as part of this ruse Dobell made papier-mâché cows and scattered them around airfields to deceive the Japanese pilots – "Said Bill, I think the authorities underestimate the eyesight of the Japanese airmen". There is very little historical record that these cows actually existed although Dobell's camouflage activities at Menangle and Bankstown aerodrome are well documented in the Australian War Memorial and by the photography of Max Dupain.

Dobell's cows were first exhibited at Niagara Galleries, Melbourne, in 1993. Whilst studying at the Slade, a work from this series, ‘Two men lifting a cow’ was reproduced in France on the front page of Libération. These early indications that Kelly's work had broader resonance beyond Australia influenced Kelly greatly, and his thoughts for future international projects.

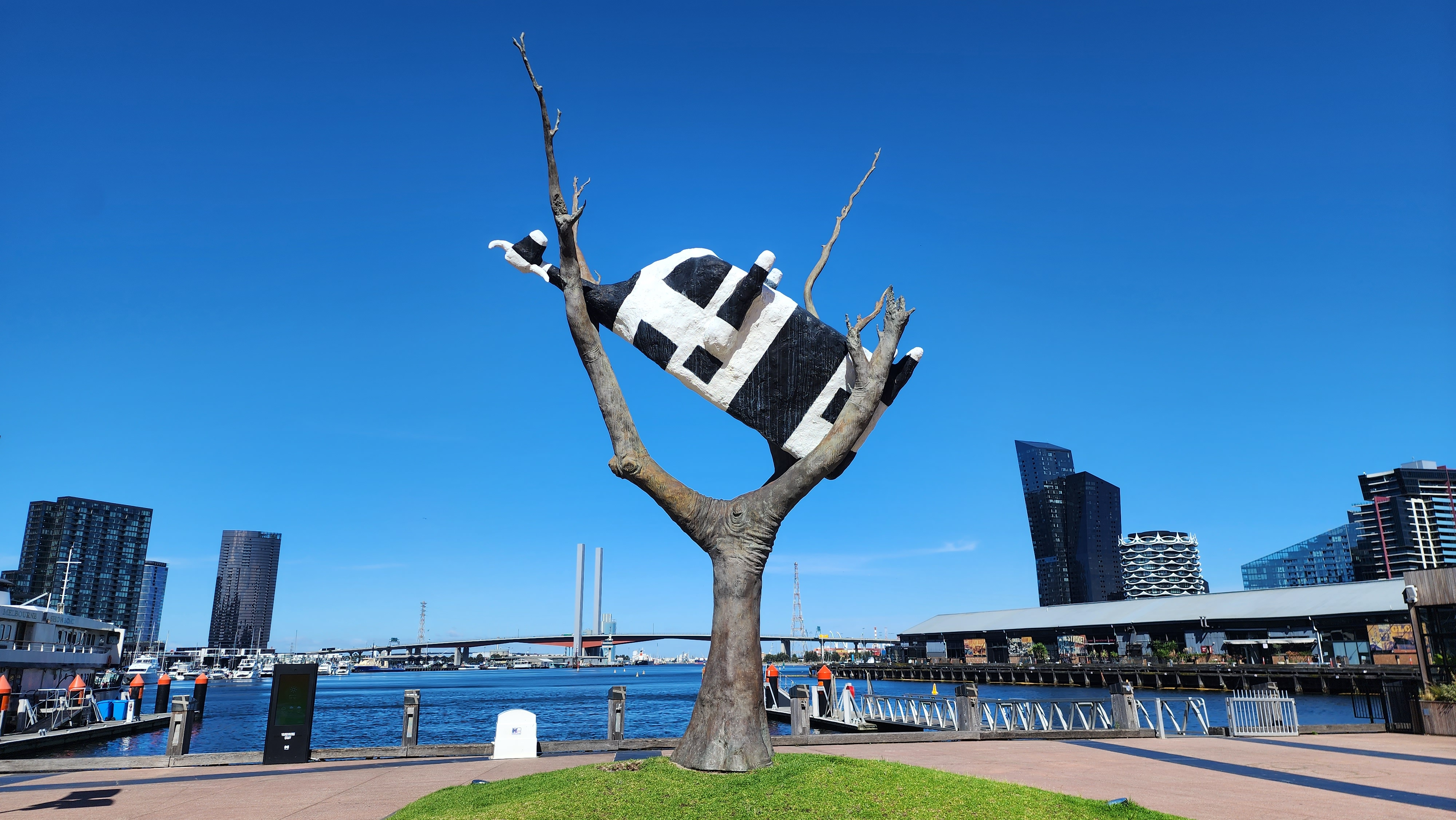
Cow Up A Tree in Harbour Esplanade, Docklands

=== Cow up a Tree and other sculptures ===
In 1999, Kelly was asked by the City of Paris to exhibit in a sculpture exhibition, "Champs del la Sculpture II", held on the Champs-Élysées to mark the millennium. This exhibition included internationally recognised artists such as Red Grooms, Nam June Paik, Tony Cragg, and Barry Flanagan.

At the famous Coubertin Foundation, just outside Paris, Kelly created his iconic 'Cow up a Tree' sculpture, an 8-metre high, four ton bronze sculpture that reproduces Dobell's camouflage cows upside down, high in the branches of an Australian gum tree. This surreal sculpture, based on flood imagery from Australia, caused a Parisian sensation and was commented upon in worldwide media including in The Times, "Cows and debris put Paris back on modern art map" (Charles Bremmer, 14 September 1999), Time Magazine, the BBC and almost all the French media. This sculpture, one of three in the edition travelled back to Melbourne where it has been on permanent public exhibition as part of Melbourne's Docklands precinct. The second sculpture has been exhibited at The Hague's Sculpture Festival, Glastonbury Festival (2007), where it features in a Kaiser Chief's music video "When the Heat Dies Down". From 2007-08, Le Musée d'Art moderne et contemporain (MAMAC) in France where it was juxtaposed against the work of Alexander Calder and Niki de Saint Phalle.

After the Champs Elysèes exhibition he went on to exhibit another monumental bronze work, "Three Cows in a Pile", at the Monte Carlo Sculpture Festival, La Parade des Animaux, in 2002. Other artists in this exhibition included Alexander Calder, Red Grooms and Keith Haring.

In 2003, "Holy Cow – the art of John Kelly", a half-hour television documentary was aired in Australia. In 2005, "Three Cows in a Pile" was exhibited at Glastonbury Festival and also at the Goodenough College in London's Mecklenburgh Square. This exhibition also raised money for a perennial student bursary and was so successful the college has named room 345, Kelly's old room at the Goodenough Trust as it was in 1996-1997 when he studied at the Slade.

=== The Logo series ===
The Monte Carlo sculpture Festival was to be a turning point in Kelly's imagery for it was here he clashed first with the legal world and then the Arts bureaucracy. In accepting the invitation to exhibit in Monte Carlo, Kelly was sued by Arts'd’Australie & Stephane Jacob, a Parisian art dealer, who claimed he was the artist's agent in France. In facing the Parisian court, Kelly sought support from the Australia Council for the Arts and the Australian Embassy. The Embassy refused his request for mediation,

After an appeal, the Australian Council offered a small grant to Kelly. In accepting, he was contractually obligated to use the logo of the Arts funding body, which consists of a sun and kangaroo emblem. At the same time Kelly discovered that the Australia Council had contracted Saatchi and Saatchi, at a cost of hundreds of thousands of dollars, to undertake a report titled Australians and the Arts.

This report found that the Arts were very much a 'brand' and led to an Australia Council strategy of 'Branding the Arts'. As branding can only lead to conformity, Kelly viewed it as anti-art and objected to the concept. Using poetry, letters and articles

Kelly began to agitate to have this policy abandoned but to no avail. Finally, using his contractual obligations he tried to subvert the Arts Council by using the Arts council logo in his work, which possibly more effectively critiqued the Australian Council's strategy, for all reference to branding was later removed from their website. In its place were instructions, titled 'Incorrect usage', which explained how not to use the logo. These instructions could also have been an accurate description of Kelly's work and the title 'Incorrect Usage' was used as the title of Kelly's 2005 exhibition at the Piccadilly Gallery in London.

Arts'd’Australie's case relied on the concept that an unwritten agency agreement existed between the parties.

However, in 2004, the Tribunal de Grande instance dismissed the entire case. Arts d'Australie appealed and the case was re-heard. The Appeals court again found that Stephane Jacob was not Kelly's French Agent but awarded the dealer 20,000 euros. In all, the French court case had dragged on for five years. After the case was over, Kelly was quoted as saying, "many artists would consider being a parasite upon an art dealer an unlikely and extraordinary achievement."

=== Moo Brew Beer Labels ===
In 2005 Kelly was asked to design beer labels for a boutique Australian beer made by the Moorilla Estate in Tasmania. In an ironic twist he accepted and produced a series of paintings to be reproduced as labels for the beer, Moo Brew. The paintings did not use Dobell's cows but incorporated a deconstructed logo, which was in keeping with the Saatchi and Saatchi report that said 'Australian Art should be down to earth and accessible'. The artist who opposed ‘branding the Arts’ had effectively used the advice to brand the beer with his deconstructed logo work.

=== Deconstructing Australia ===
In 2006, Kelly was invited by Agnew's Gallery in London to exhibit his work. The gallery who formerly represented Sir Sidney Nolan exhibited three paintings from the Logo series in 'Looking Forward – 30 British Artists'. In late 2006 the McClelland Sculpture Park and Art Gallery surveyed a collection of his sculptures in a show titled 'Deconstructing Australia', which introduced a new element. This element was a shape borrowed from a Sidney Nolan painting 'Moonboy' or 'The Boy and the Moon' a seminal 1939 work by Australia's most important 20th century painter. At first Kelly simply turned it upside down so it became a light (Nolan's light), but eventually it evolved into other things including an alien.

With this exhibition his three key themes to date (Dobell's cows, the Australia Council logo and Nolan's Moonboy) merged to form an idiosyncratic set of symbols that reference Australian modernist history, critique bureaucratic meddling in the Arts and formed a set of symbols that peculiarly become Kelly's although the references are direct and specific (an example is Nolan's Moonboy metamorphosis into an Alien). Also in 2007 he exhibited in Ireland at the Fenton Gallery with a show titled 'There was an Englishman, an Australian and an Irishman...' In the book 'Representing art in Ireland', the writer Fergal Gaynor described Kelly as an "obsessive" and "awkward" artist. A documentary 'Deconstructing John Kelly' was made by Fine Eye Productions and released in 2013.

=== Recent exhibitions ===
Kelly's recent paintings and sculptures have been complemented by his building of scale models of real museums and galleries including the Tate gallery in London, the Australian Centre for Contemporary Art and the Lewis Glucksman Gallery in Cork. In quietly acquiring and subverting these institutions, much as he did with the Australia Council he has held miniature exhibitions in their sanctified spaces.

In the recent work, 'The Probe', he introduced the surveillance camera where the viewer becomes the viewed and, in 2008, he was invited as a 'Free Radical' to exhibit in the Guangzhou Triennial in China where his work 'The Probe II' was acquired by the Guangdong Museum of Art. His work is also represented in the National Gallery of Australia and the Art Gallery of New South Wales as well as Musée Poulain in Vernon, France and the Ballarat and Benalla galleries.

In August 2018, Kelly suffered a health crisis but recovered sufficiently to make art again.

== Writing ==
Kelly's articles and reviews have been published in Circa magazine in Ireland and Art Monthly in Australia. His take on the art world in Cork, where he lives has created debate in the Irish Times, especially when he exposed the selection process at the 'Open' held at the Crawford gallery in 2007. Aidan Dunne wrote “...the balance of power in the art world has shifted to the extent that curators play a prescriptive and constitutive role in what artists do and how their work is framed and presented, to the extent that artists are crucially dependent on curatorial approval. So Kelly is making a good point in his open letter in shifting attention onto the role of the curatorial selectors in deciding on what we see when we go into a gallery”. Kelly was critical of the two curators, France Morris (Tate Modern) and Enrique Juncosa (Irish Museum of Modern Art).

Kelly is also a regular contributor to the Daily Review – an independent Arts Journal. Several articles regarding what Kelly refers to as the "disproportionate representation" of private galleries and the appointment of the chair for Australian Venice Biennale 2019 selection panel again sparked considerable controversy and discussion in the media.

Aside from his critical writing he is also co-writing a play based on Sir William Dobell's life with the award-winning Scottish playwright Alan Gilmour. Kelly has recently exhibited at the Salamanca Arts Centre in Hobart, Tasmania and also at the Liverpool Street gallery in Sydney.
