= City Gallery =

City Gallery may refer to:

- City Gallery (Hong Kong)
- City Gallery (Leicester)
- City Gallery (Manhattan)
- City Gallery Wellington
- Singapore City Gallery
