= Coubertin Foundation =

French museum nonprofit organization

Coordinates: 48°N 2°E

- Fondation de Coubertin
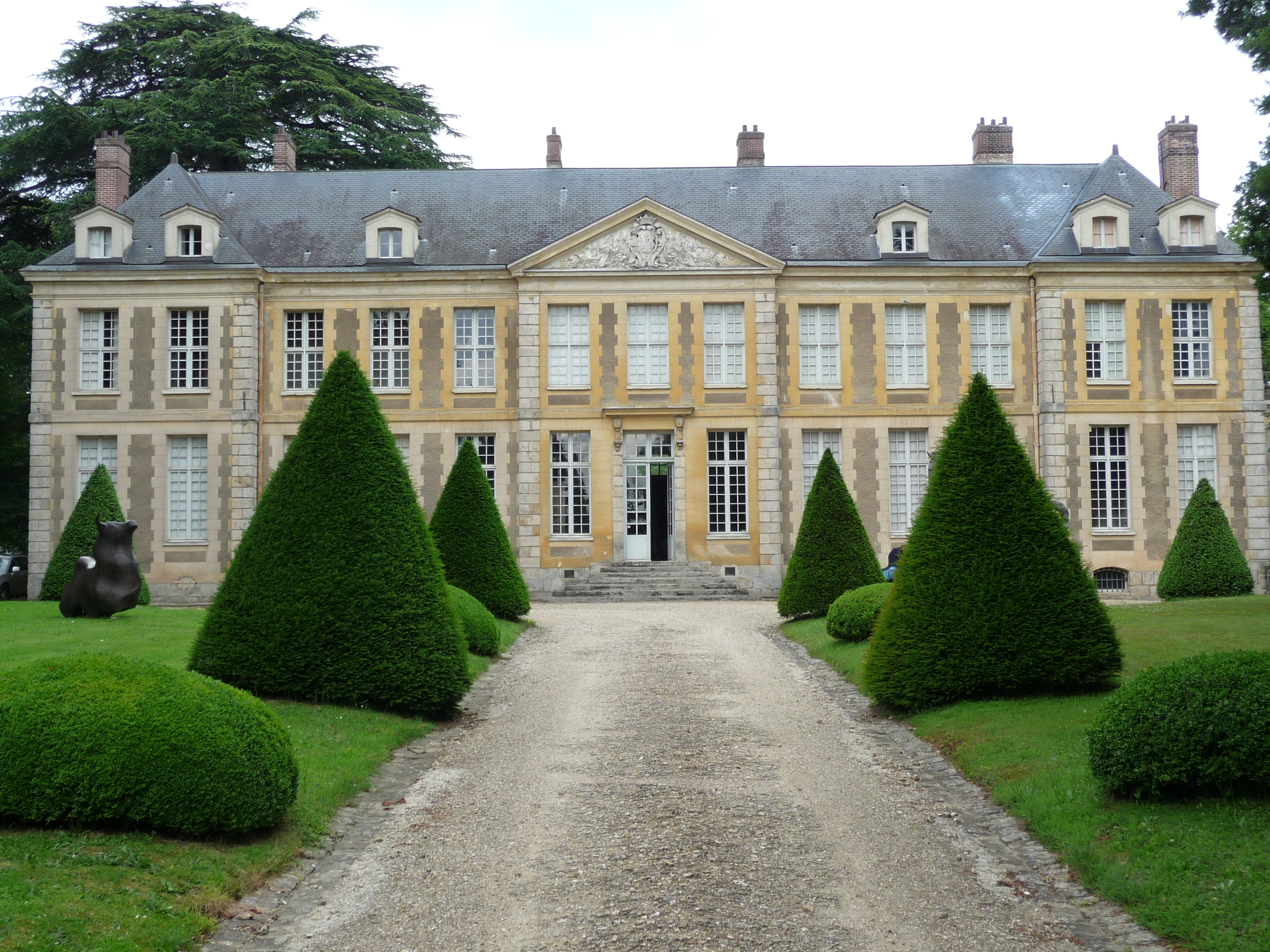
- Location: 78470 Saint-Rémy-lès-Chevreuse
- Type: Art museum
- Founders: Yvonne de Coubertin and Jean Bernard

The Coubertin Foundation (French: Fondation de Coubertin) is a French foundation that conducts training in the crafts and operates a sculpture museum in Saint-Rémy-lès-Chevreuse.

== History ==
The foundation was born from the meeting in 1949 of Yvonne de Coubertin (1893–1974), a niece of Pierre de Coubertin who owned an estate in Saint-Rémy-lès-Chevreuse, and Jean Bernard, artist and renovator of the Companionship of Duty of the Tour of France and the only child of sculptor Joseph Bernard. In 1950 they created an association for to transmit skills in manual arts and crafts, including carpentry, cabinetmaking, stonecutting, masonry, plaster, metalwork and painting. This association became in 1973 the Fondation de Coubertin and gained tax-exempt charity status.

== Location ==
The 80 hectares (200 acres) Coubertin estate is located in the valley of Chevreuse in Saint-Rémy-lès-Chevreuse, in the French countryside. The entrance to the estate opens onto a linden-shaded driveway leading to the palace gate. Behind the gate, a French driveway leads to a castle of the late seventeenth century, with a sober facade. To the right of the castle, below, is the garden of bronzes and behind the castle, an English park. The castle is listed as a historical monument by decree of 7 September 1945.

== Mission ==
The purpose of the Coubertin Foundation is to develop young peoples' skills in the manual arts and instill in them concern for quality of workmanship, honesty and responsibility. The foundation accepts about 30 apprentices each year in manual arts and crafts, mostly from the Workers' Association of Companions of Duty and Tour of France. Professional training is provided in masters' workshops. The Saint-Jacques workshops are for metalwork, carpentry and stone-cutting; the Saint-Jacques workshops carried out the complete reconstruction of the royal gate at the Versailles palace as it existed before 1771. The Foundry of Coubertin provides training in metalwork and cast art; in 2008, the foundry completed Jean Cardot's Flame of Liberty for the Embassy of the United States in Paris.

== Sculpture collection ==
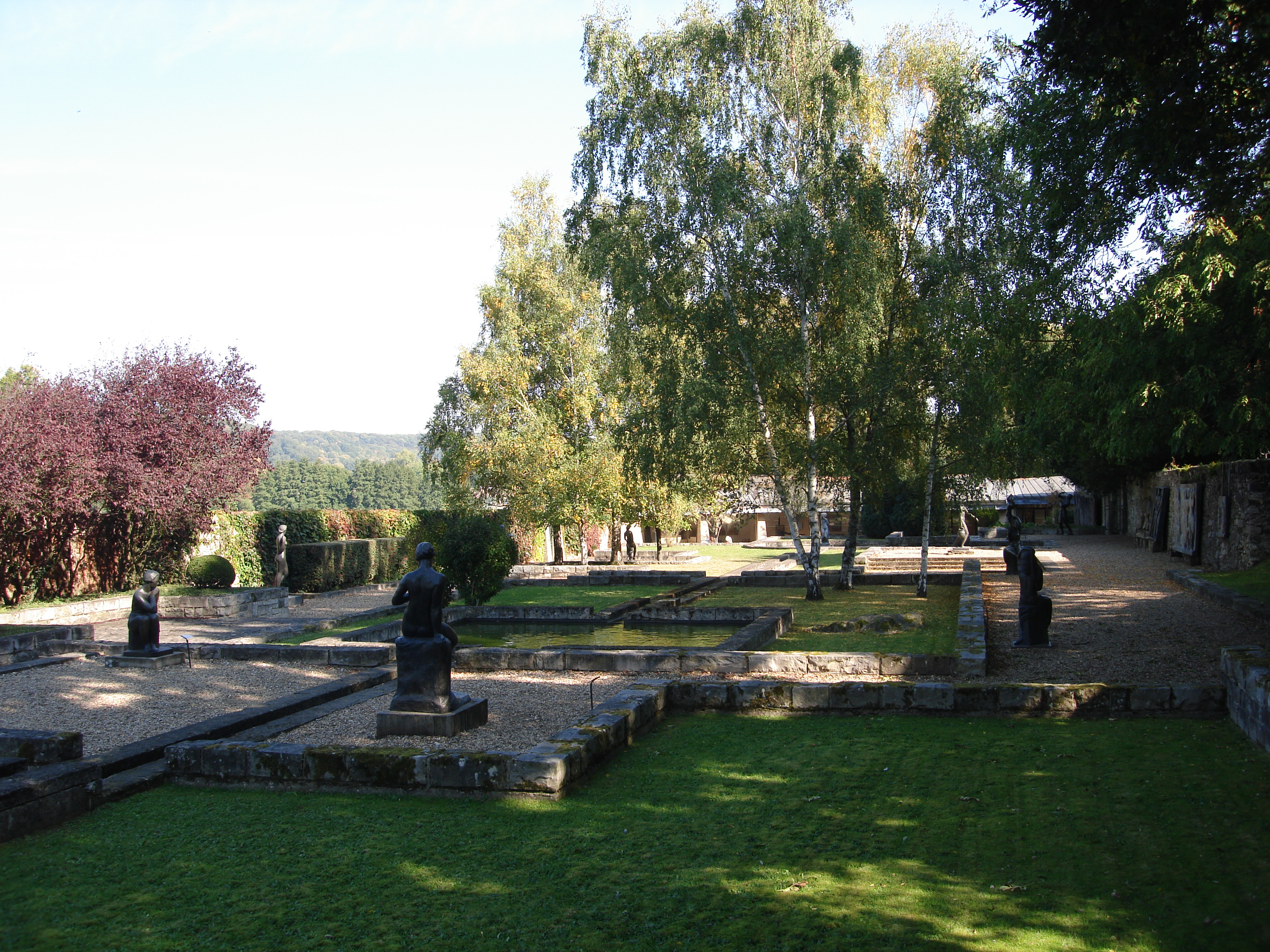
The bronze garden of Robert Auzelle.

The collections of the Foundation of Coubertin are located in the palace of the estate. The foundation received from its second president, Jean Bernard, a donation of 21 sculptures and 1,500 drawings by his father, the sculptor Joseph Bernard.

In 1994, the workshop funds of sculptor René Collamarini (1904–1983) were added to the collections.

The foundation has a set of sculptures ranging from the end of the 19th century to the 20th century (116 pieces): Robert Wlérick, Pablo Gargallo, Carlo Sarrabezolles, Jean Chauvin, Étienne Hajdu, Marta Pan, Jean Cardot as well as an important selection of sculptor drawings. The foundation collection also a donation from the Bourdelle museum and pieces by Étienne Martin, Marta Pan, Parvine Curie, Karel, Dominique Labauvie and John Kelly. Around this collection, the architect Robert Auzelle has set up an open-air sculpture museum, the Jardin des Bronzes.

== Major exhibitions from 1986 to 2012 ==
- 1986: sculptures du xxe siècle;
- 1987: bronzes d’automne, de Rodin à Zadkine;
- 1988: la sculpture en taille directe en France, de 1900 à 1950;
- 1989: pierres et marbres de Joseph Bernard;
- 1990: Aux grands hommes, David d’Angers;
- 1991: genèse d’une sculpture, le monument à Michel Servet, de Joseph Bernard;
- 1992: Jean Chauvin;
- 1993: Étienne Hajdu;
- 1996: Étienne Martin;
- 1998: Gilioli;
- 1999: course of sculpture in Île-de-France (selection from the collection of the Regional Contemporary Art Fund (FRAC) of Île-de-France);
- 2000ː Marta Pan;
- 2001: Jean Cardot;
- 2002: Eugène Dodeigne;
- 2005: Nicolas Alquin;
- 2007: forty drawings by Joseph Bernard (exhibition at the Orangerie of Madame Élisabeth in Versailles);
- 2008: Jean Bernard, artist and companion of duty, on the centenary of his birth;
- 2009: sculptures by Antoine Poncet (poetic resonances with Jean Arp and Philippe Jaccottet);
- 2010: sculptures by Ousmane Sow (May 8 to July 11);
- 2011: a look at Rodin's photographs, videos, installations by Jean-Yves Cousseau (from May 7 to July 10, 2011);
- 2012: sculptures by Denis Monfleur (from May 5 to July 22, 2012).

== See also ==
- Masterpiece (companionship) (on French Wikipedia)
- Apprenticeship
- Pierre de Coubertin
- Metalworking
