= Alan Gilmour (playwright) =

Alan Gilmour is a playwright and librettist. Born in Edinburgh and raised in Hamilton, Scotland, he studied, lived and worked in London before moving to Melbourne, Australia.

== Early works in theatre ==
After studying Drama and Theatre Arts at Goldsmiths College, University of London, Gilmour's first play The Piano Lesson (2005), a work based on the Matisse painting, won the Orange Playwriting Prize 2005 (best play by a new Scottish writer). This led to a successful production at Òran Mór, Glasgow with Joanne Cummings playing Hannah, the piano student who makes up for a chaotic personal life with an obsession for music and particularly her piano teacher, the unseen and much lusted-over Greg.

This was followed by The Gyntish Self (2006), an energetic romp through the classic tale of Peer Gynt, co-written with Rob Drummond and Ewen Glass and produced by the young, Scottish Theatre Company Measureless Liars, "A jaunty skim through our hero's search for self that takes in street-smart localised patois and a deadpan acquisition of pop psychology therapy speak. "I just need to re-focus, " says Peer in one moment of reflection" Glasgow Herald.

== Music ==
Throughout 2006, Gilmour worked with Eugene Skeef and the London Philharmonic Orchestra creating librettos, words and movements for community symphonies such as PECKHAM SPLASH (2006), performed in The Queen Elizabeth Hall, South Bank Centre, London. This project grew out of an ability, which Gilmour and Eugene Skeef shared, to quickly generate music and lyrics from stories that the people of Peckham shared in workshops, a series of stories that formed the basis of the musical work.

London Excite: A Symphony of London (2007/8) was developed out of Gilmour and Skeef's experience of doing community work with the orchestra but was always meant to be on a vast scale. Commissioned as the Orchestra's 75th anniversary symphony and the culmination of the Royal Festival Hall's re-opening season: the work used a full orchestra, 160-piece choir and six soloists to tell the story of London, who it is, what it as and who its people are. Gilmour generated the libretto from fragments of poetry, music, workshops and stories that collected in a journey through London. or see the rehearsals and experience some of the music. London Excite was presented at The Royal Festival Hall, 7 June 2008.

Since moving to Melbourne Australia in 2006, Gilmour has been working on an operatic journey through Australia The Australian Constitution: Ten Small Operas About One Big Country (2007/9). In November 2008 one of the operas was presented as a work-in-progress at La Mama, Carlton with the first five of the small operas being presented at the Carlton Courthouse in August 2008.

Gilmour is currently Associate Artist with Chamber Made Opera and contributor to a discussion on the future of Australian opera in 3MBS Radio's On Air Magazine.

== Back to the theatre ==
Gilmour is currently working on two plays: one based on the classic poem Memories of Christmas by Dylan Thomas and a play on the life of William Dobell, a major collaboration with the artist John Kelly (artist).
