= Amy Kravitz =

American film director

- Born: Massachusetts
- Years active: 1980–present
- Spouse: Steven Subotnick

Amy Kravitz (March 6, 1956, Wilmington, Delaware) is an independent filmmaker and teacher specializing in abstract animation. She is currently a Professor in the Film Department at the Rhode Island School of Design.

== Work ==
As a young girl, Amy Kravitz began making and teaching animation in Yvonne Andersen's famed Yellow Ball Workshop. Amy went on to obtain a B.A. in Social Anthropology from Harvard University, and received an MFA in Experimental Animation from the California Institute of the Arts. During her studies at CalArts, she was mentored under Sky David and Jules Engel. She taught Animation at Harvard and the School of the Museum of Fine Arts, Boston, before becoming a professor in the Film Department of the Rhode Island School of Design where she has taught Experimental Animation since the 1980s, and from time-to-time has served as the department chair.

Her film work includes River Lethe (1985), The Trap (1988), and Roost (1999). She states that her approach to filmmaking is "direct and visceral." Her films have been screened worldwide and have received numerous prizes and awards.

In 2022, Kravitz was named the Honorary President of the Ottawa International Animation Festival's return to an in-person festival after being virtual to previous two years.

== Personal life ==
Amy lives and works in Providence, Rhode Island with her husband, Steven Subotnick. She has two daughters.

== Filmography ==
River Lethe (1985)

The Trap (1988)

Roost (1999)
