= Yvonne Andersen =

American film director

- Born: September 7, 1932 (age 94); Long Beach, California
- Occupations: Filmmaker, teacher, author
- Known for: Co-founding the Yellow Ball Workshop

Yvonne Andersen (born September 7, 1932) is an American animated filmmaker, author, and teacher. She is most well known for co-creating the Yellow Ball Workshop with her husband, Dominic Falcone. The Yellow Ball Workshop was a school for both children and adults to learn about animation.

Andersen and her husband produced many of the films created by their students. Following the Yellow Ball Workshop, Andersen taught at the Rhode Island School of Design.

Andersen was a strong believer in the potential of children. She said that children would innovate the fields they entered, so it was important to encourage and support them. Amy Kravitz, a former student of Andersen, stated: "When I was a child in her class, one of the most important things Yvonne did was take me seriously. She took all of us seriously."

== Career ==
Andersen shot her animated films on 16 mm film and used "pixillation, cutouts, and puppet animation" in them. Her films have been noted as having a "strong graphic visual style and poetic structure." While Andersen herself created many films, much of her career involved teaching others about film-making, as well as promoting and producing their films. Reviews of her books have described them as good for beginners and filled with useful ideas on making animated movies.

=== The Sun Gallery ===
The Sun Gallery was created in Provincetown, Massachusetts by Andersen and her husband in 1955 following Andersen's education. This exhibition was open during the summer and was a place for young and up and coming artists to have their work shown. Artists who had their work shown at The Sun Gallery include "Red Grooms, Lester Johnson, Robert and Mary Frank, Vera Williams, Tony Vevers, and Alex Katz." The gallery ran from 1955 to 1959, during which around 100 artists were promoted.

=== The Yellow Ball Workshop ===
The Yellow Ball Workshop was a place for mainly children (although all ages were welcome) to learn about the processes of making animated films, which included using the materials to create their own films. Using the camera, synchronizing sound and picture, and animating the figures were among the skills taught at this workshop. Andersen would always have art supplies for her children to use, and she encouraged them to invite their friends over to use them as well. This led to children regularly coming to Andersen's home, sometimes when her own children were not there, to use these art supplies. A group of the children expressed desire in creating a film, which led to a two-minute film using the resources they had. Shortly after, one of the children created a script which would become The Yellow Ball Workshop's first produced film, The Amazing Colossal Man. The group worked together to create the film, and this became the basis for The Yellow Ball Workshop starting in 1963. Between 1963 and 1980, the Yellow Ball Workshop produced more than a dozen films. The animation program at the Rhode Island School of Design took inspiration from The Yellow Ball Workshop, and Andersen would go on to teach at this school.

=== Rhode Island School of Design ===
Andersen was approached for a job opportunity at the Rhode Island School of Design in 1979. She worked part-time for 5 years before becoming a full-time teacher, she taught "flat animation, stop motion and film special effects." Later, she spent 9 years as the head of the Film and Video Department. Andersen worked at this school for a total of 23 years before retiring in 2002.

== Filmography ==
Year	Title	Role	Notes
1962	The Laundry	Director	
1962	One Hot Dog With Mustard	Director	
1963	Spaghetti Trouble	Co-director	Co-director Red Grooms
1964	The Amazing Colossal Man	Producer	Made by Andersen's students
1966	Fat Feet	Cinematographer	Directed by Red Grooms
1969	Meow, Meow	Cinematographer	Directed by Red Grooms
1970	Let's Make A Film	Director	
1977	I Saw Their Angry Faces	Director	
1994	We Will Live Forever	Director	

== Books ==
- Make your Own Animated Movies (1970), Little, Brown and Company
- Teaching Film Animation To Children (1970), Van Nostrand Reinhold
- Make Your Own Animated Movies and Video Tapes (1991), Little, Brown and Company
