= Steven Subotnick =

American animator

Steven Subotnick (born 1956 in San Francisco, California) is an American animation teacher and animator. He received a BFA in Film from UCLA. He later received an MFA in Experimental Animation from California Institute of the Arts. While at CalArts, he was mentored under Jules Engel.

He is married to animator Amy Kravitz. He has taught animation at Harvard University, the School of the Museum of Fine Arts in Boston, and currently at Rhode Island School of Design and Massachusetts College of Art and Design. Steven Subotnick is the son of Morton Subotnick.

== Filmography ==
- Lake (2013)
- Baby (2012)
- Fight (2012)
- Boy (2011)
- Two (2011)
- West (2011)
- Thine (2011)
- Jelly Fishers (2009)
- Glass Crow (2004)
- Hairyman (1998)
- The Devil’s Book (1994)
- Calling Cards (1992)
- Twins (1986)
- The Dancing Bulrushes (producer, 1985)
- 3 Nocturnes (1985)
- Snow Woman (1985)
