= The Royal Gate of the Palace of Versailles =

Coordinates: 48°48′15.5″N 2°7′20″E

- Grille royale du château de Versailles (French)
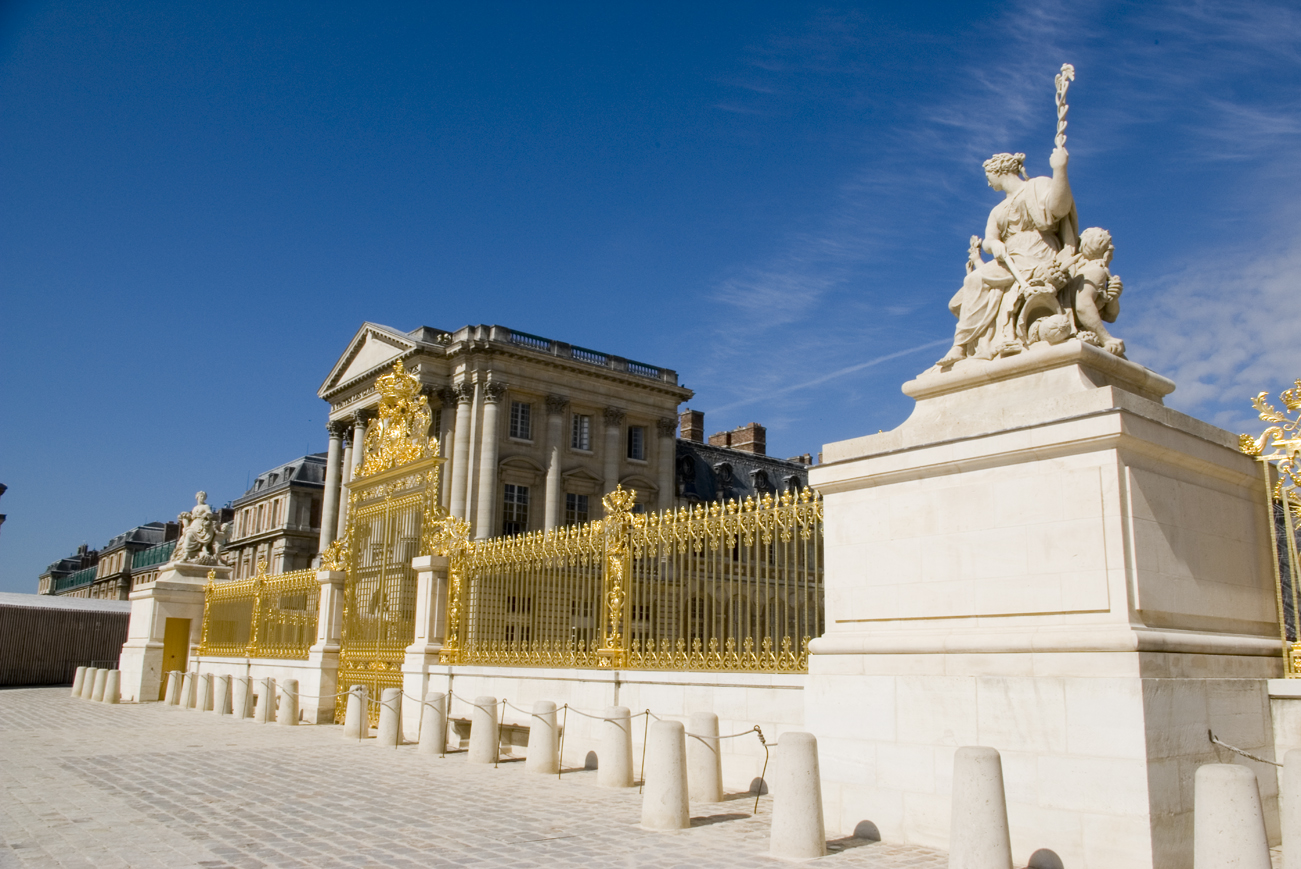
- Gate of the Palace of Versailles in 2009
- Interactive map of the The Royal Gate of the Palace of Versailles area

General information
- Location: France

The Royal Gate of the Palace of Versailles separates the Cour d'Honneur from the Royal Court of the Palace of Versailles. It is also located between the Pavillon Dufour (on the left as you enter), built under Louis XVIII and currently used to welcome visitors to the château, and the Gabriel wing (on the right), whose construction began in 1772, but which was not completed until 1985.

The Royal Gate was destroyed in 1794, during the French Revolution. It marked the castle's outskirts at the end of the 17th century for less than a century before reappearing in a new version in 2008.

Although considered restitution by its architect Fréderic Didier, art historians have criticized this initiative.

== History of the gate ==
The gate was designed during the reign of Louis XIV by Jules Hardouin-Mansart, the King's First Architect and Superintendent of the King's Buildings, around 1680 when the castle underwent significant changes. During the same period, Hardouin-Mansard was also the author of the palace facade, the park side, and the north and south recessed wings.

This gate was the work of several ironworkers associated with its elaboration and installation: Luchet, Marie, Godignon, and Belin, considered the best professionals in their field at the time. Gilded and ornamented with rich pillars or pilasters, the gate opened through two portals that gave onto two lateral courtyards called "Cours des Princes" and "Cours de la Chapelle." The old gate then extended between the columns of the pavilions of the side wings located at the end of the castle, which the Dufour pavilions and the Gabriel wing have now replaced. Then, this gate curved in a quarter circle on the courtyard of Honor to end on two stone sentry boxes, which were used as a guardhouse.

Most of it was removed in 1771 or 1772, during the last years of Louis XV's reign, due to the construction of the Gabriel wing. It was temporarily replaced by a simple wooden palisade that remained in place during the reign of Louis XVI.

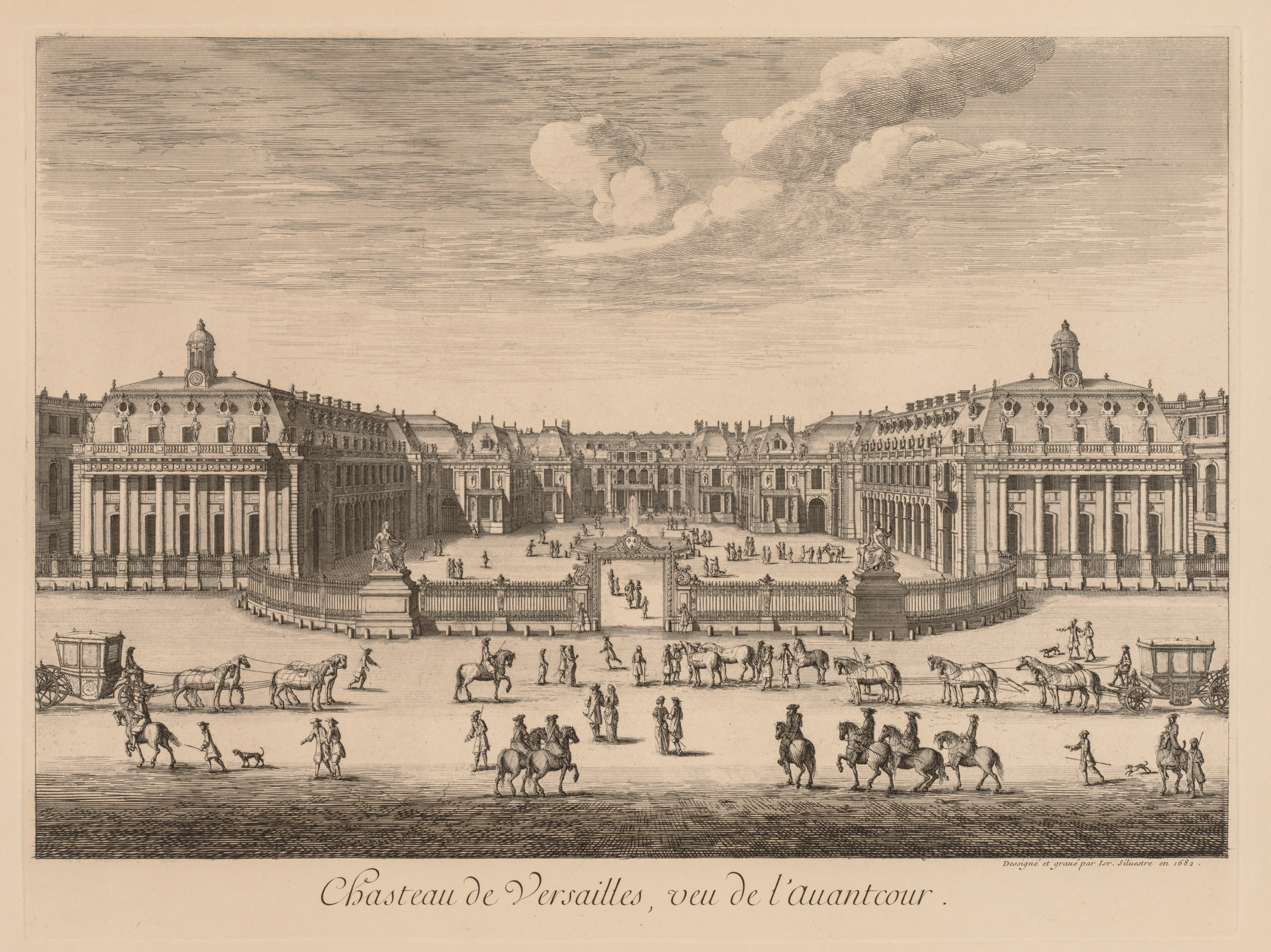
Watercolor representing the gate in the 17th century by Israël Silvestre (1621–1691).

The maintenance of this simple barrier (due to the non-completion of the Gabriel wing) facilitated access to the rioters of October 5 and 6, 1789, who were thus able to penetrate more quickly into the castle enclosure, than into the building itself.

By virtue of an order issued by the Versailles district directorate in August 1794, the Royal Gate was destroyed, the Cour Royale was cleared and the Cour de Marbre lost its precious floor.

In 1838, an equestrian statue of Louis XIV was installed in its place as part of the creation of the Museum of the History of France by Louis-Philippe I. It was then moved when the new gate was installed.

Between 2005 and 2008, a new gate is built. It required the use of 15 tons of iron and 100,000 gold leaves. Most of the financing (3.5 million euros) was provided as part of the sponsorship of the public works group Monnoyeur which was celebrating its 100th anniversary that year.

A controversy arose on the occasion of this reconstruction.

== Controversy ==
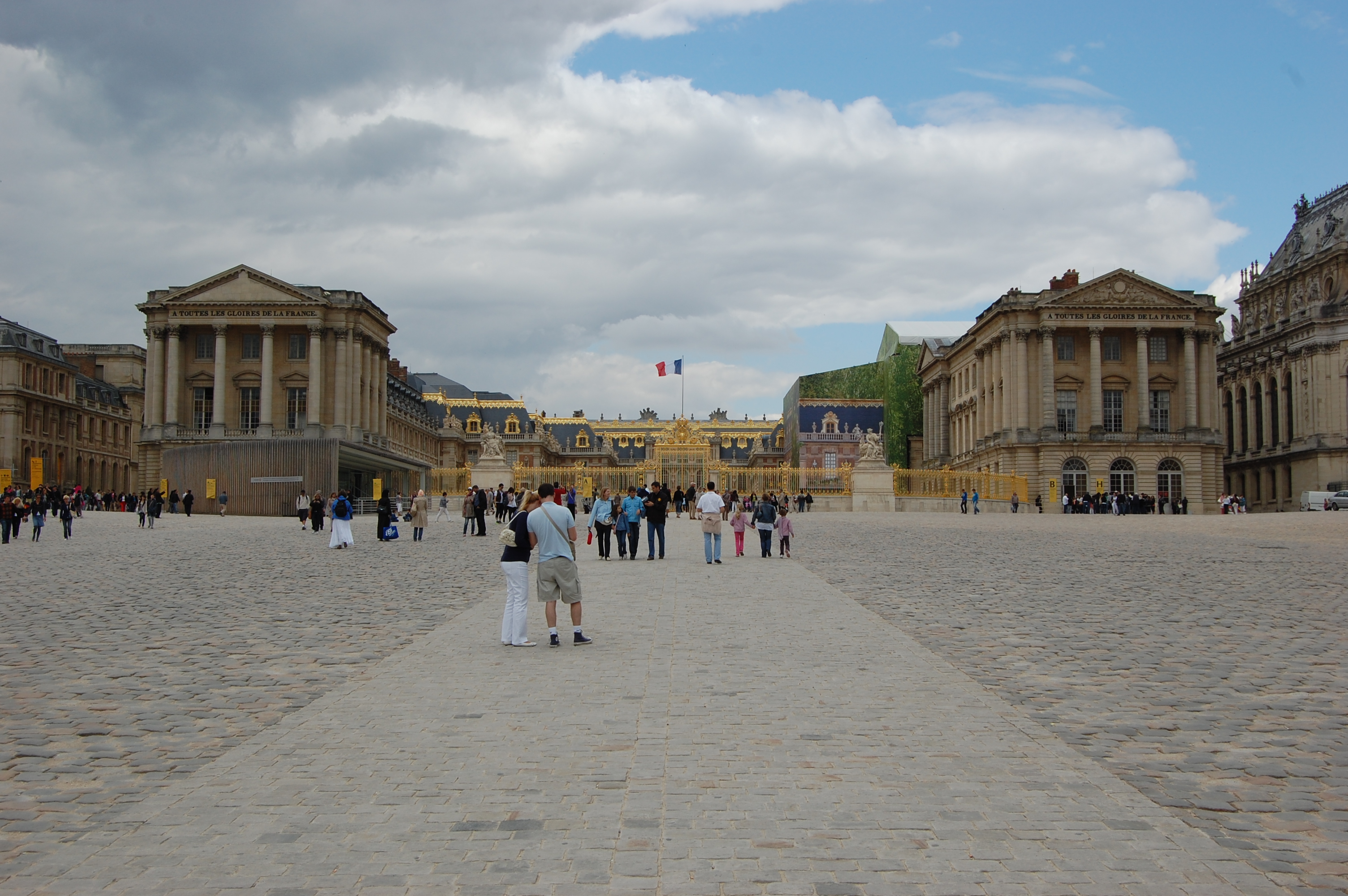
The Gabriel wing framed the castle gate, the royal courtyard on the right, and the Dufour pavilion on the left in 2011.

=== Controversy on the Restitution of old states ===
The controversy began even before the construction of the gate because of the non-respect of the "last known state" of the monument, the rule for the restoration of old buildings.

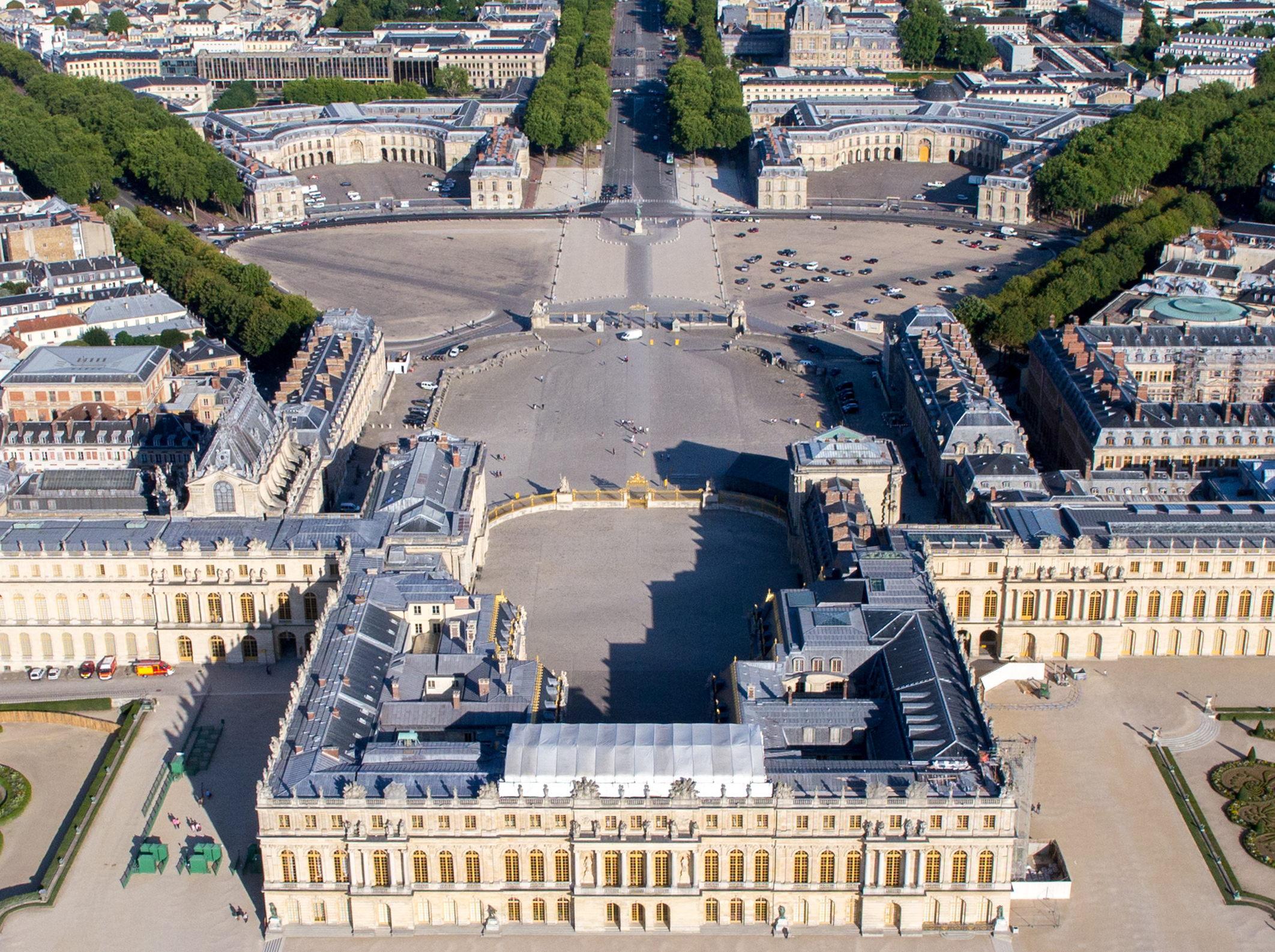
Aerial view of the courtyard of honor, the royal court and the royal gate in 2013.

For the critics of this project, there is a desire to ignore the history of Versailles in the nineteenth century to return to the state of the seventeenth century without a valid reason. The construction also requires the relocation of the equestrian statue of Louis XIV, which was purposely placed there in 1838. This decision amounts to denying that Versailles was an important place in the nineteenth century and disregarding the will of Louis-Philippe. The journalist Didier Rykner speaks of "official vandalism." The weakness of the sources on the gate increases the difficulty, as the engravings of the period contradict each other and need to allow for precise knowledge of the ornamentation of this gate. Some commentators also emphasize the need for coherence in the project, which does not correspond to any existing state, since the Gabriel wing dates from the eighteenth century and the Dufour pavilion from the nineteenth century, i.e., after the destruction of the original grid.

On the contrary, according to Béatrix Saule, director of the castle museum, this new project is in line with the interventions carried out since the beginning of the 20th century, which aim to present the royal estate in a state that best reflects that of the end of the Ancien Régime. From a functional point of view, the gate must, first of all, serve to control the flow of visitors: whereas the castle formerly presented a multitude of hardly identifiable visitor circuits, the gate makes it possible to direct visitors towards more obvious entrances, and to use the royal courtyard, now integrated into the visit, to facilitate the distribution of the apartments. Finally, suppose the gate is a new work made according to the old plans. In that case, the two sculpted groups on top of the gatehouses (Peace, by Tuby, and Abundance, by Coysevox) are perfectly authentic: they had been replaced in the forecourt and have found, after restoration, their original location.

=== Polemic on professional ethics and the risk of conflicts of interest ===
In an article in "Le Monde" , Adrien Goetz uses the grid as the basis for his concerns about the perverse effects of the law on patronage and risk of conflict of interest for the architects of Historical Monuments: "As soon as a patron is found, the chief architects, who take 10% of each building site, offer him miraculous reconstructions, like this monstrous golden grid". But the grid cost five million euros. In the same article, Adrien Goetz paradoxically affirms that "the restitution of heritage is essential" because it is a question of "recovering its pride, its culture."

== Archaeological excavations ==
Before the construction of the gate, an archaeological site had been set up to uncover the foundations of the first gate created by Jules Hardouin-Mansart. The lower parts of the former layout of the castle's courtyard fence were discovered during this work site, particularly one of the ditches framing the central gate. This one showed faunal remains, generally large mammals, corresponding to the remains of meals that were probably consumed by the castle guards of the time and who therefore used these ditches as a dumping ground.

== Gallery ==
Some views on the royal gate of the Palace of Versailles.

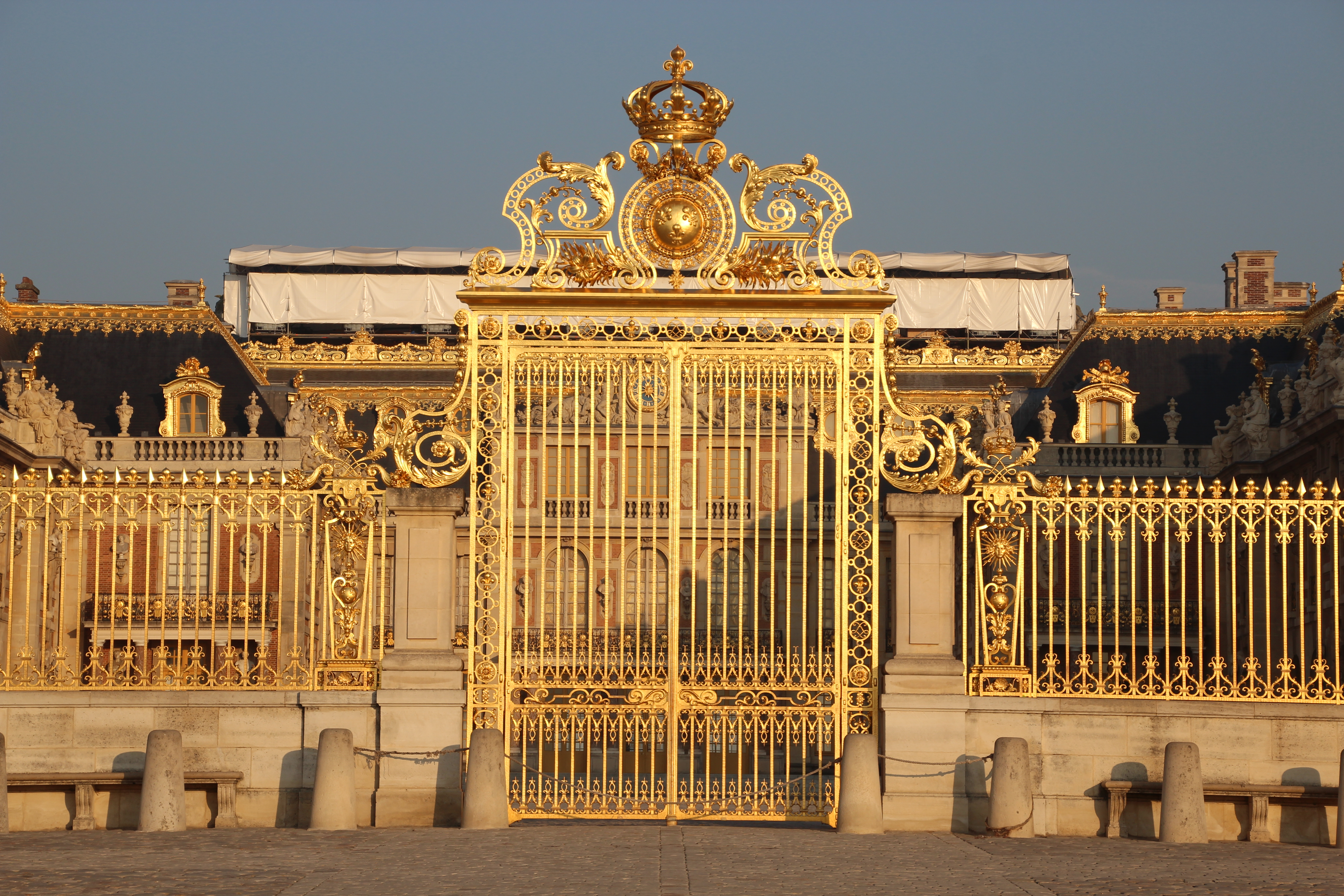

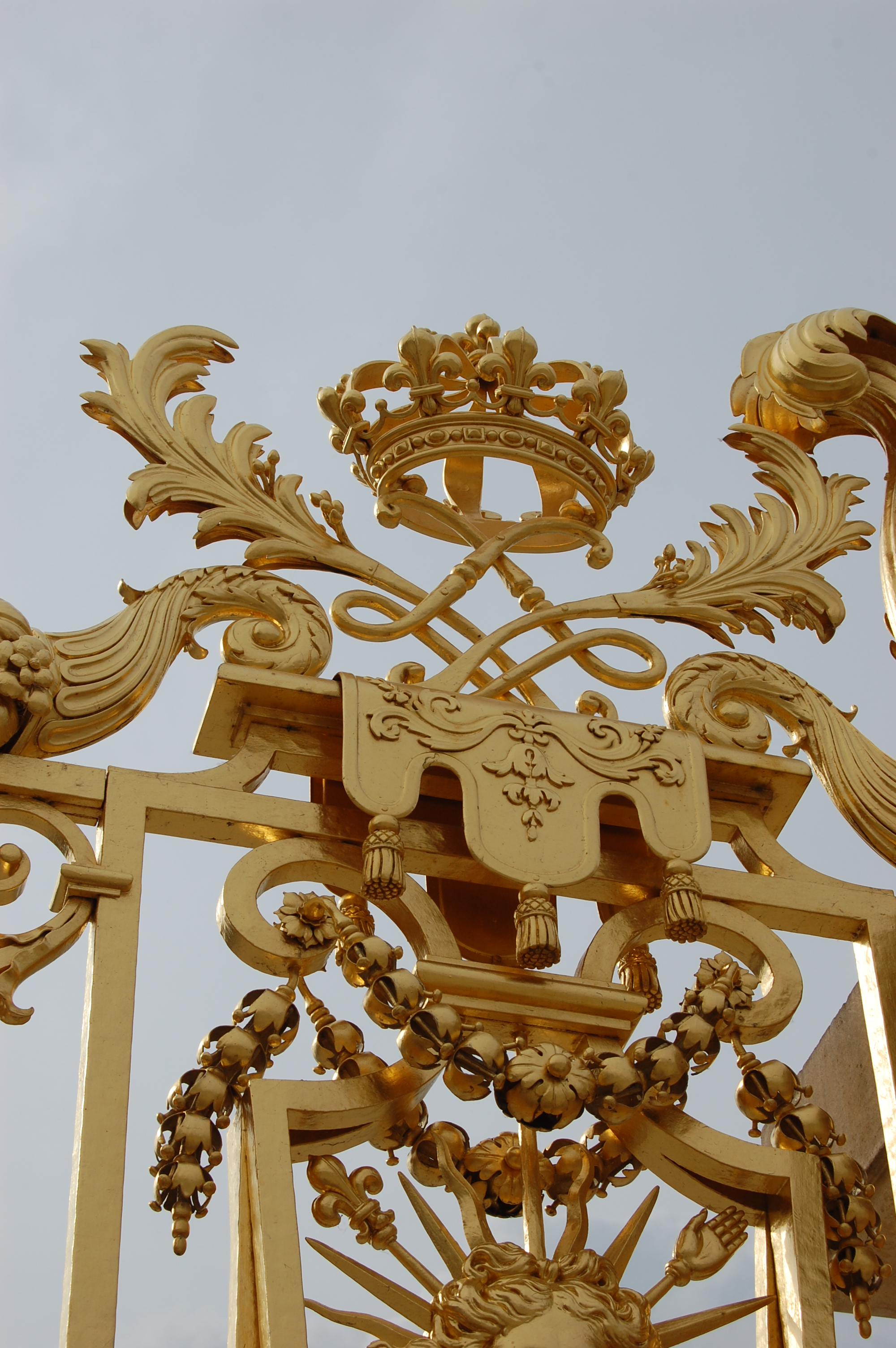

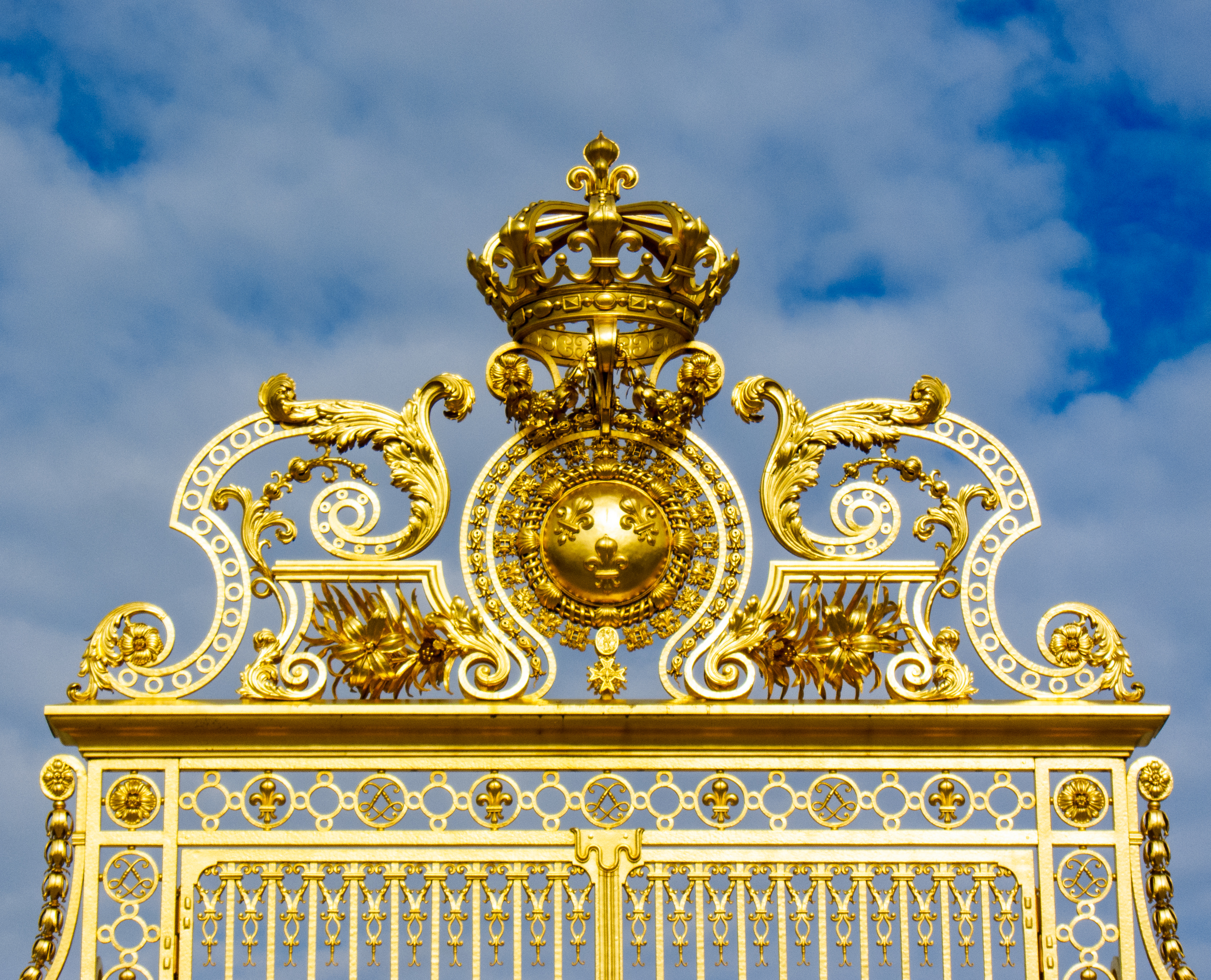

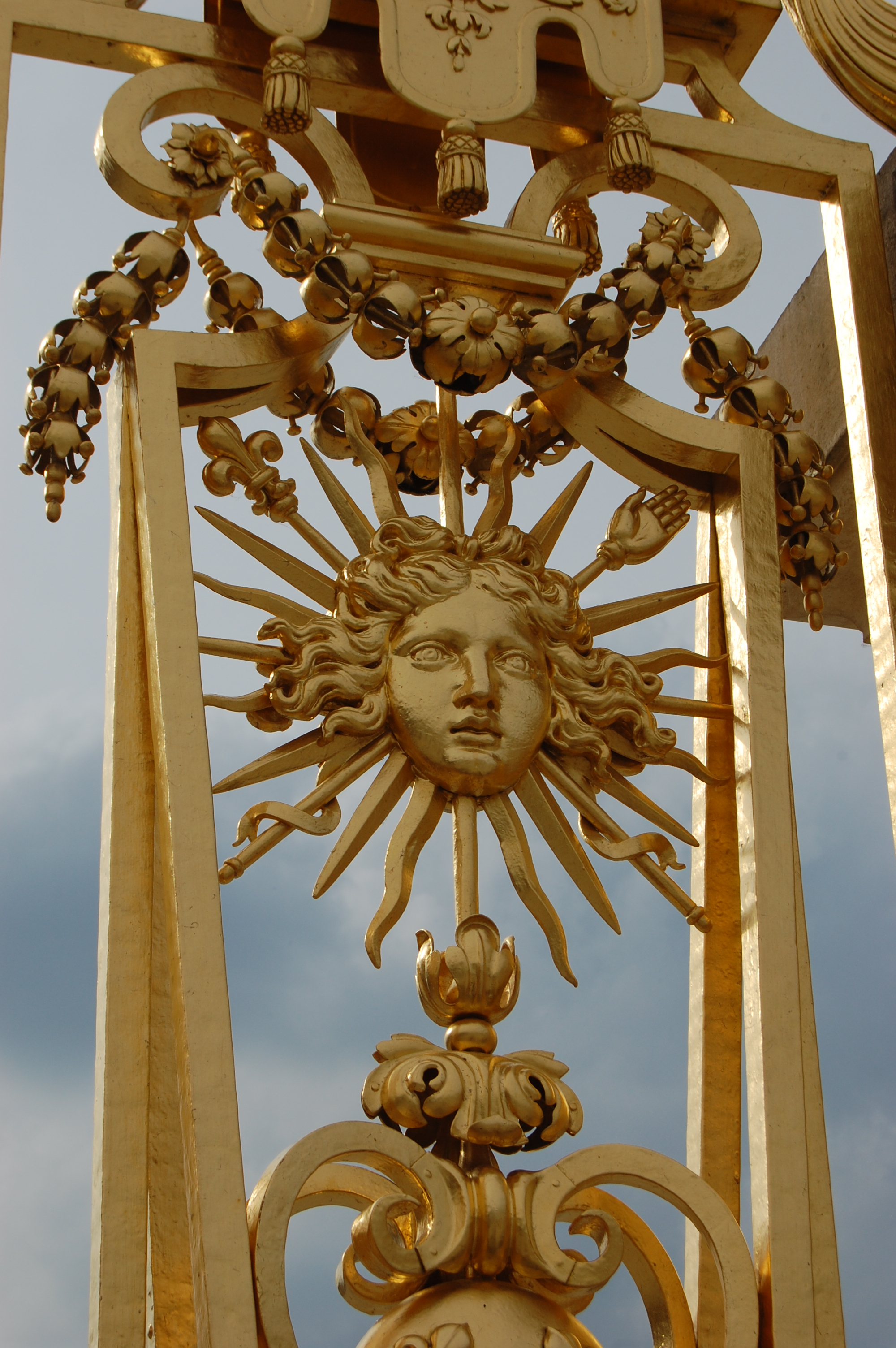

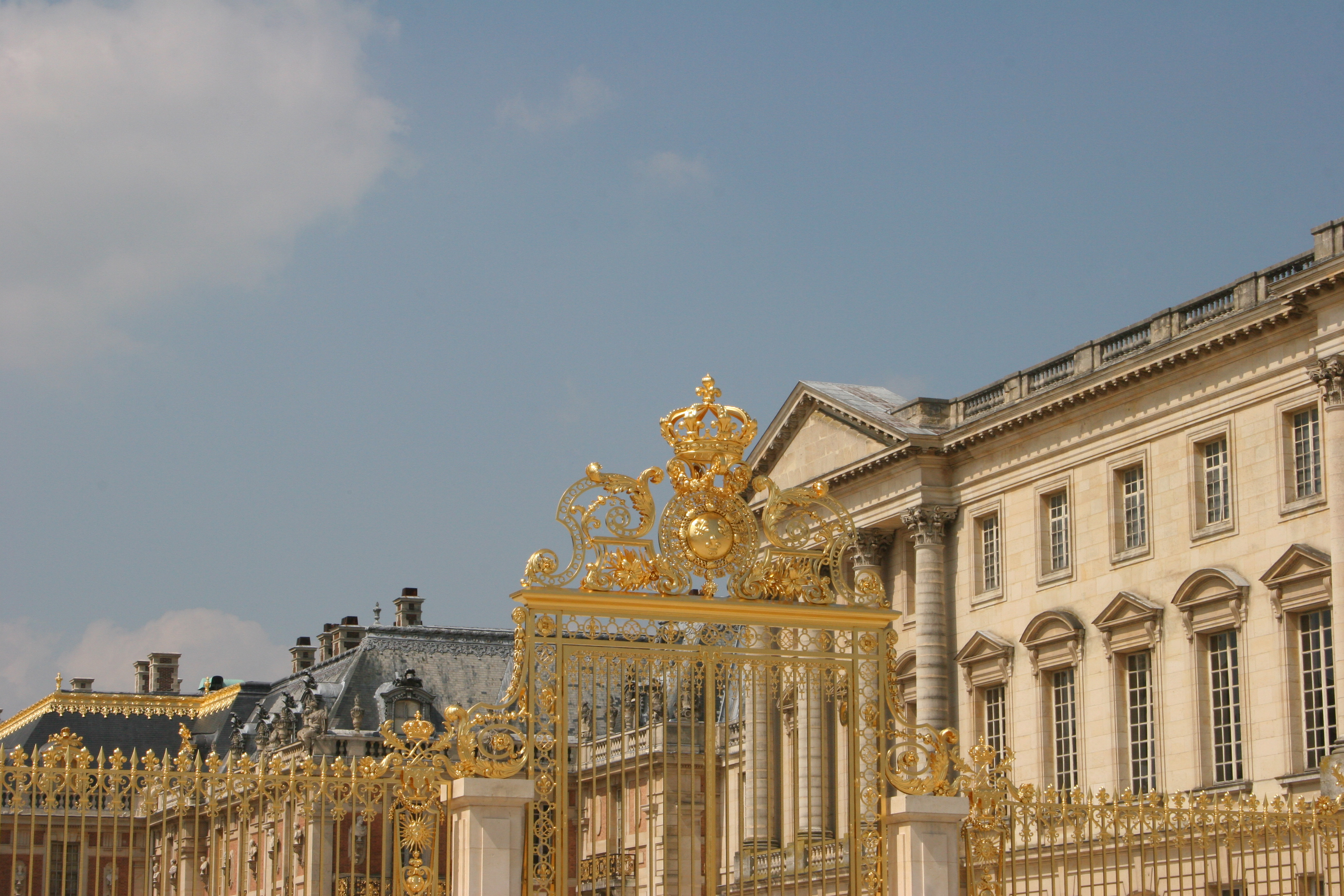

== See also ==
- Palace of Versailles
- Subsidiary structures of the Palace of Versailles
- Royal court
