= Mimi Gross =

American artist (born 1940)

Mimi Gross (born 1940) is a New York City born American artist.

== Biography ==
=== Early life ===
Gross was born in New York City in 1940. She is the daughter of the sculptor Chaim Gross. She grew up on the Upper West Side of Manhattan among the artist community of her parents, which included Raphael Soyer, Moses Soyer, Arnold Newman, Max Weber, and David Burliuk. From 1963-1976 she was married and collaborated with the artist Red Grooms.

=== Career ===
Mimi Gross's work spans from painting and drawing, films, mail art, book design, costume and set design, indoor and out of door installations, diorama and sculpture. Gross is known for her work in oil crayon, chalk pastel, and oil paint.

She began exhibiting in Provincetown, MA, an artist colony where she spent her summers with her family, in 1957, including a three-woman show at the Sun Gallery in 1958. She had a solo show at the Provincetown Art Association in 1997, as well as several solo shows in various galleries there.

She became well known for large 3-D constructions she made with her husband, including City of Chicago (1967–68), Discount Store (1970–71), Astronauts on the Moon (1972) and Ruckus Manhattan (1975–76).

She has collaborated with Douglas Dunn, beginning with Foot Rules in 1978 and most recently tanks under trees (2008) with text by Anne Waldman and Cassations (2012).

Gross serves on the faculty of MICA, Maryland Institute College of Art, and was the 2010/11 McMillan/Stewart Chair in Painting.

== Sources ==
- Kokoli, Alexandra M. ed., Feminism Reframed, Swartz, Anne, “The Feminist Art Project,” Newcastle, UK, Cambridge Scholars Publishing, 2008, 293-4.
- Kirwin, Liza, More Than Words: Illustrated Letters from the Smithsonian’s Archives of American Art, Princeton, NJ, Princeton Architectural Press, 2005, x, 44-46, 188.
- Nadel, D. (2017, January 27). Critical eye: Mimi Gross in her world. Art in America, 105(2), p. 29-32. Retrieved from https://www.artinamericamagazine.com/news-features/magazines/critical-eye-mimi-gross-* "Mimi Gross," The New Yorker, Apr 17, 2000, 20.
- Francine A. Koslow, "Mimi Gross at David Brown Gallery," Artforum, November 1988, 149.
- Jeffrey Deitch, "Report from Times Square," Art in America, September 1980, 62.
