= Red Grooms =

American multimedia artist (born 1937)

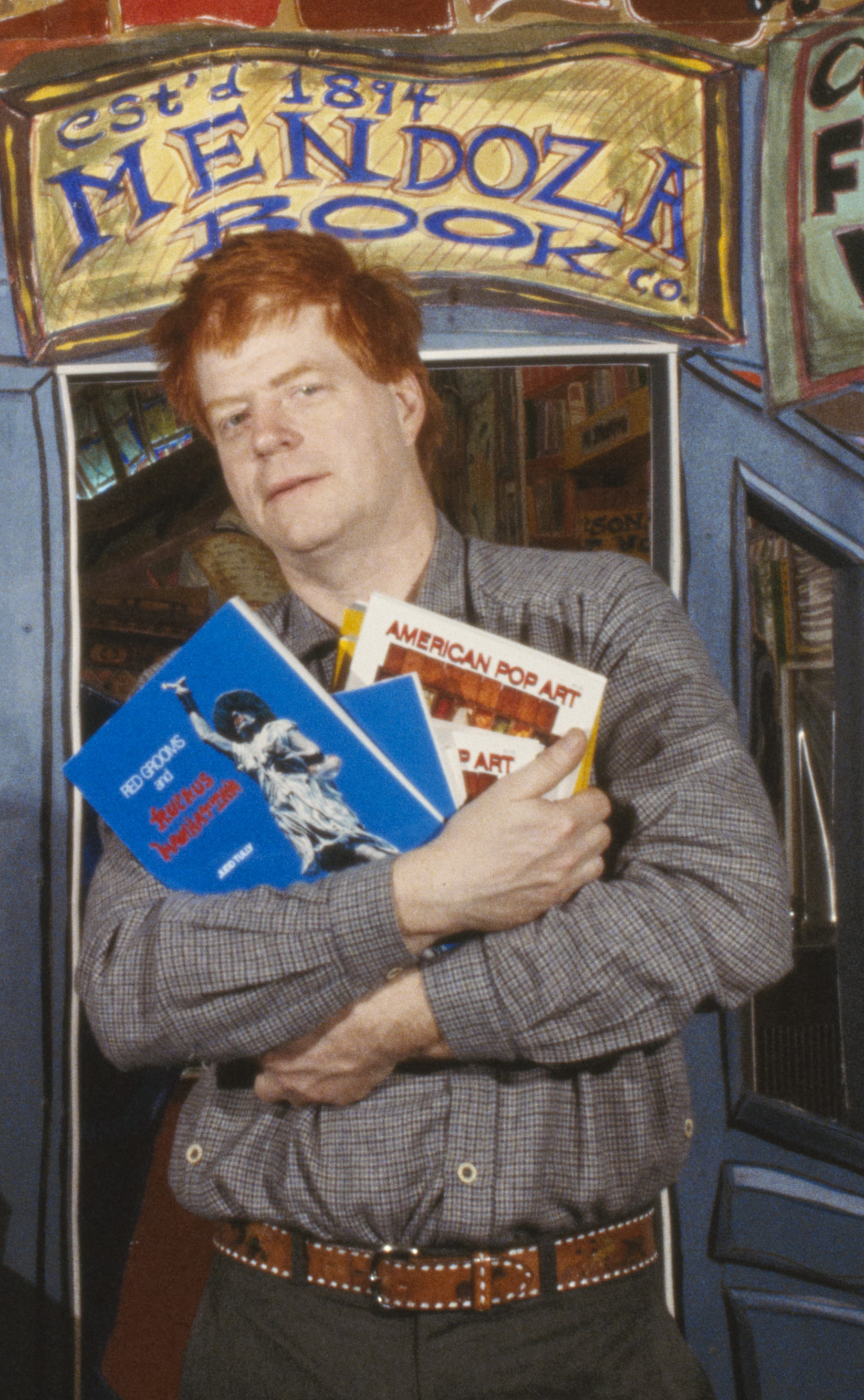
- Red Grooms with his work "Bookstore" in 1978
- Born: Charles Rogers Grooms; June 7, 1937 (age 89); Nashville, Tennessee
- Education: Art Institute of Chicago, Nashville's Peabody College
- Known for: Multimedia art; printmaking

Red Grooms (born Charles Rogers Grooms on June 7, 1937) is an American multimedia artist best known for his colorful pop-art constructions depicting frenetic scenes of modern urban life. Grooms was given the nickname "Red" by Dominic Falcone (of Provincetown's Sun Gallery) when he was starting out as a dishwasher at a restaurant in Provincetown and was studying with Hans Hofmann.

== Background and education ==
Grooms was born in Nashville, Tennessee during the middle of the Great Depression. He studied at the Art Institute of Chicago, then at Nashville's Peabody College. In 1956, Grooms moved to New York City, to enroll at the New School for Social Research. A year later, Grooms attended a summer session at the Hans Hofmann School of Fine Arts in Provincetown, Massachusetts. There he met experimental animation pioneer Yvonne Andersen, with whom he collaborated on several short films.

Red Grooms belongs to a generation of artists who, in G. R. Swenson's words, "took the world too seriously not to be amused by it." As Judith Stein notes, "At times Grooms's humor has an absurdist streak, full of the impetuous energy and preposterous puns of the Marx Brothers. He shares a comic sense with Bob and Ray whose straight-man/funny-man teamwork plays off against the mundane conventions of daily life. As an empiricist with a keen political sense and a retentive memory for visual facts, Grooms follows in the tradition of William Hogarth and Honoré Daumier, who were canny commentators on the human condition."

In 1969, Peter Schjeldahl compared Grooms to Marcel Duchamp, because both embodied "a movement of one man that is open to everybody."

== Career ==
=== Early work ===
In the spring of 1958, Grooms, Yvonne Andersen and Lester Johnson each painted 12 by 12 feet (3.7 m × 3.7 m) panels, which they erected with telephone poles on a parking lot adjacent an amusement park in Salisbury, MA.

Inspired by artist-run spaces such as New York's Hansa Gallery and Phoenix, and Provincetown's Sun Gallery, Grooms and painter Jay Milder opened the City Gallery in Grooms' second-floor loft in the Flatiron District. When Phoenix refused to show Claes Oldenburg, Grooms and Milder dropped out of Phoenix and City Gallery presented Oldenberg's first New York exhibition, as well as that of Jim Dine. Other artists who showed at City Gallery include Stephen Durkee, Mimi Gross, Bob Thompson, Lester Johnson, and Alex Katz. Grooms recalls, "We were reacting to Tenth Street. In '58 and '59, Tenth Street was sort of like SoHo is now, and it was getting all the lively attention of everyone downtown....We were just kids in our twenties..and had a flair for attracting people to our openings."

During the late 1950s and early 1960s, Grooms made a number of "Happenings". The best known was The Burning Building, staged at his studio (dubbed "The Delancey Street Museum" for the occasion) at 148 Delancey Street in New York's Lower East Side between December 4 and 11, 1959.

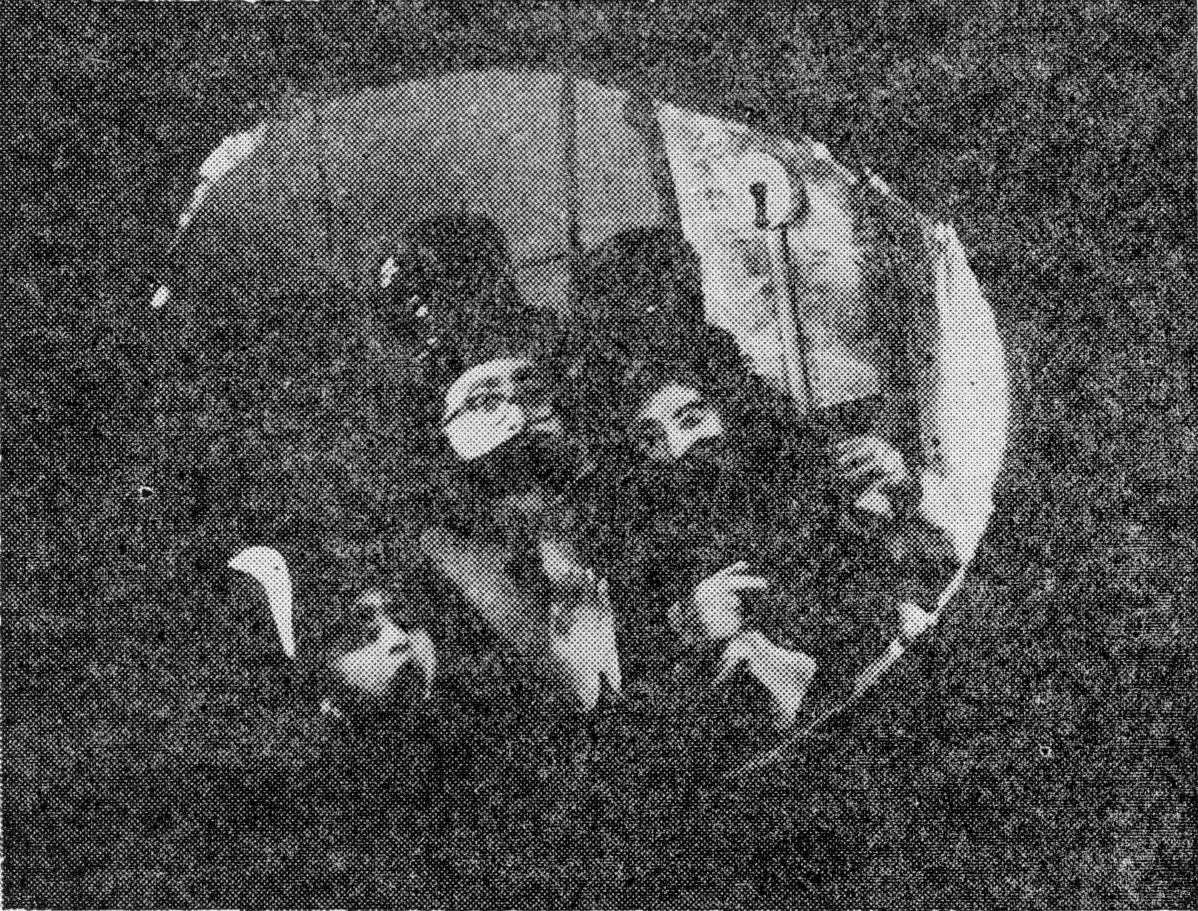
Publicity still from Shoot the Moon (1962)

Inspired by Georges Méliès's 1902 film A Trip to the Moon, Grooms' early film Shoot the Moon (1962) features celebrants played by Edwin Denby, Alex Katz and Grooms seen shredding library books to make confetti. Other Grooms films include:The Big Sneeze (1962), a hand-drawn comic filmed by Rudy Burckhardt; Before an' After (1964), a sadomasochistic comedy that casts Mimi Gross as part dominatrix/part healthclub operator; Fat Feet (1966), a collaboration with Mimi Gross, Yvonne Andersen and Dominic Falcone that begins where Shoot the Moon ends; Tapping Toes (1968–70), which uses his first sculpto-pictorama City of Chicago (1967) as its set; Conquest of Libya by Italy (1912–13) (1972–3), a black and white animation that spoofs that era's newsreels; Hippodrome Hardware (1973), based on Grooms' 1972 live performance of the same name, whose main character Mr. Ruckus is played by Grooms; Grow Great (1974), a live-action short that features Mimi Gross as the household consumer; Little Red Riding Hood (1978), which features his daughter Saskia; and Man Walking Up (1984).

Today, Grooms is recognized as a pioneer of site-specific sculpture and installation art. City of Chicago (1967), a room-sized, walk-through "sculpto-pictorama," features sky-scraper-proportioned sculptures of Mayor Daley and Hugh Hefner "joined by such historical figures as Abraham Lincoln, Al Capone, and fan-dancer Sally Rand, accompanied by a sound track featuring gunfire and burlesque music. Grooms's genius for rendering the intricacies of architectural ornament is vividly apparent in several three-dimensional vistas of Chicago's famous buildings. Evident here and in the numerous other cityscapes Grooms has created is his extraordinary ability to capture a sense of place with a great sensitivity to detail."

Another sculpto-pictorama, Ruckus Manhattan (1975, created in collaboration with Mimi Gross and over twenty other collaborators) exemplifies the mixed-media installations that would become his signature craft. These vibrant three-dimensional constructions melded painting and sculpture, to create immersive works of art that invited interaction from the viewer. The pieces were often populated with colorful, cartoon-like characters, from varied walks of life. The work was exhibited at 88 Pine Street from 1975 to 1977 and "launched Grooms to stardom".

His satirical environmental installation The Discount Store was shown at VCU's Anderson Gallery in 1979. One of his biggest themes is the use of painting people, often using other artists or their styles to show his appreciation for their works.

=== Mature work ===
Regarding his large wall relief, William Penn Shaking Hands with the Indians (1967), based on a similarly titled painting by Benjamin West, Grooms remarked, "To tell the truth I did [the work] more because of Mr Benjamin West than Mr. Penn. Benjamin West is a hero for American Art. ... As I understand he set up the whole tableau for The Treaty on his estate using actors from a touring Shakespeare company Then he had an easel installed in the basket of a hot air balloon tethered at 60 feet, and with the help of sandwiches and birch beer hauled up to him by his wife, painted this great masterpiece in six days. To me, this is exemplary American behavior."

Grooms's two most notable installations—The City of Chicago (1967) and Ruckus Manhattan (1975)—were enormously popular with the public. These works were executed in collaboration with then-wife, the artist Mimi Gross. Along with Gross, he starred in Mike Kuchar's Secret of Wendel Samson (1966), which tells the story of a closeted gay artist torn between two relationships. In the 1990s Grooms returned to his Tennessee roots, creating likenesses of 36 figures from Nashville history for the Tennessee Foxtrot Carousel (1998).

Grooms' sculpture The Shootout, which depicts a cowboy and an Indian shooting at one another, drew protests by Native American activists when it was unveiled in Denver in 1982. The sculpture was evicted from two locations in downtown Denver after protesters threatened to deface it. In 1983 the sculpture was moved to the grounds of the Denver Art Museum, and now sits on the roof of the museum restaurant. Grooms commented "Denver is beginning to rival Grumpsville, Tennessee, as one of the great sourpuss towns."

=== Other media ===
Besides painting and sculpture, Grooms is also known for his prolific printmaking. He has experimented with numerous techniques, creating woodblock prints, spray-painted stencils, soft-ground etchings, and elaborate three-dimensional lithograph constructions.

His 1973 purchase of a hot-glue gun facilitated several masterpieces of paper sculpture; for example, Sam, a portrait of Sam Reily who appeared in Fat Feet; and Gretchen's Fruit, a tour-de-force still life. In 1979, Grooms spent a week teaching at the University of New Mexico, in Albuquerque, where he first started working in bronze. Regarding the several western and football themes made in metal, Grooms told Grace Glueck: "It looks just like my regular stuff, but it's for the ages. . . It turns out to be easier to work with than less durable materials." The monumental Lumberjack (1977–1984), cast from a whimsical woodsman Red made as a gift for artist Neil Welliver, demonstrates his facility with the lost-wax method of casting.

== Collections and honors ==
Grooms' work has been exhibited in galleries across the United States, as well as Europe, and Japan. His art is included in the collections of thirty-nine museums, including the Art Institute of Chicago, the Museum of Modern Art in New York, the Whitney Museum of American Art, the Metropolitan Museum of Art, Cheekwood Botanical Garden and Museum of Art in Nashville, the Montgomery Museum of Fine Arts, the Cleveland Museum of Art, the Carnegie Museum of Art, the Knoxville Museum of Art, and the Tennessee State Museum.

In 2003, Grooms was awarded the Lifetime Achievement Award by the National Academy of Design.

== Personal life ==
Grooms currently lives and works in New York City in a studio in lower Manhattan at the intersection of Tribeca and Chinatown, where he has lived for around 40 years. He has one daughter, Saskia Grooms.
