= George Nelson Preston =

Ghanaian historian (born 1938)

George Nelson Preston aka Nana Anakwa, the Aboafohene of Akuapem-Mamfe, Ghana (born 1938), is an artist and scholar of African art, and the author of essays, reviews, and books on traditional African art and Contemporary art. He has participated as curator, writer, and presenter for The Bronx Museum; Brooklyn Museum Installed display of selections of permanent collection of African Art on view (1968–1978); Metropolitan Museum of Art; Smithsonian Institution; Museu Afro Brasil; Centro Conde y Duque, Madrid; Museu de Arte de São Paulo (MASP); The Schomburg Center; Review: The State of Art in New York; African Arts Magazine; and Dialectical Anthropology.

In 1959, he opened the Artist's Studio at 48 East Third Street, NYC, which hosted readings by Beat Generation poets such as Jack Kerouac, Allen Ginsberg, Frank O'Hara, Diane di Prima and LeRoi Jones (Amiri Baraka). "George Nelson Preston had a storefront 'Artist's Studio' at 48 East 3rd Street where he orchestrated the most important poetry readings ever held in New York. One historic program on Sunday, February 15, 1959, included Kerouac, Ginsberg, Corso, Orlovsky, LeRoy Jones, Jose Garcia Villa, Edward Marshall, Ted Joans, and others". He graduated in English Literature and Fine Arts from the City College of the City University of New York in 1962 and earned a master's degree I(1968) and the Ph.D. (1973), both from Columbia University in the City of New York. For the completion of his Ph.D., he conducted field research in Ghana, Ivory Coast and Togo (1968–70), resulting in a Ph. D. thesis entitled "Twifo-Hemang and the Art-Leadership Complex of the Akan of Ghana".

Preston returned to Africa on numerous subsequent occasions through 2013. He taught African Art History at the Cooper Union (1971–78) and Rutgers University (1970–73) and at the City College of CUNY (1973-2006), where he is now Emeritus Professor. He has published several academic articles and books on classical African and Contemporary Art including Sets, Series and Ensembles in African Art, 1985, Emanoel Araújo: Afro-Minimalist Brazilian, 1987 and African Art Masterpieces, 1991, among others.

Since 2003, he has been a member of the scientific committee of the Florence Biennale. In 2005, he inaugurated the Museum of Art and Origins in Harlem, New York, where he houses and exhibits his African art collection and is chief curator and chief executive officer. He is also a plastic artist, with works in the collection of the Museu AfroBrasil, São Paulo. From 14 November to 24 December 2016 he exhibited paintings and drawings in his solo exhibition entitled Journeys of an Afro-Atlantic Envoy: George Nelson Preston, at the Wilmer Jennings gallery of Kenkeleba House, curated by Coreen Jennings. Preston is a recipient of Fulbright and Foreign Area grants for fieldwork in Africa. The art alumni of The City College/CUNY Alumni Association honored him with a Career Achievement Award in 2014. In 2016 he was elected to the Pierre Verger Chair of Academia Brasileira de Arte, Rio de Janeiro.

== Works ==
- 1969: The Innovative African Sculptor. Ithaca College Museum of Art catalog, pp. 66.
- 1985: Sets, Series and Ensembles in African Art. Abrams and the Center for African Art
- 1987 Emanoel Araújo Afrominimalista / Brazilian Afrominimalist, Museu de Arte de Sâo Paulo
- 1991: African Art Masterpieces. Hugh Levin Lauter and Abrams
- 1992: America 500. Centro Cultural Recoleta, Buenos Aires
- 1982: Ancient Treasures in Terra Cotta of Mali and Ghana, by George Nelson Preston and Bernard de Grunne, African American Institute.
- 1989. Traditions and Transfprmations: Contemporary Afro-American Sculpture. 71 pp. Bronx Museum of the Arts
- 2002. Mother Africaby Armand Duchateau, Stefan Eis enhofer, Manuel A Jordan, Rogelio Martinez Fure, George Nelson Preston. 164 pp. Kerr Museum Productions.
- 2018. "Ancestralidade dos simbolos / The Ancestrality of Symbols Africa-Brasil" by Adriano Pedrosa, George Nelson Preston, Tomás Toledo and Clarival do Prado Valladares.164 pp. Museu de Arte de Sâo Paulo
