= List of light sculptures by Dan Flavin =

American artist Dan Flavin (April 1, 1933 – November 29, 1996) was best known for creating minimalist sculptural objects and installations from commercially available fluorescent light fixtures. He created hundreds of individual works and installations throughout his career, including editioned sculptures, permanent installations, and site-specific works. Below are chronological, though possibly incomplete, lists of light works by Flavin. These lists do not include Flavin's works on paper.

The majority of Flavin's extant light sculptures are listed under the "Works" section. Permanent installations are included on the main list and a separate list of permanent works. Flavin exhibited and published numerous works that were never permanently fabricated or sold in their full edition or at all. For each work listed below, edition sizes and the number of fabricated works are included.

Details about individual works - including medium, dimension, and edition size - are primarily sourced from the public collections which own many of Flavin's works, as well as the catalogue raisonné of Flavin's light sculptures published by the Dia Art Foundation in 2004.

== Works ==
These lists include every work Flavin conceptualized and executed during his lifetime, as well as several works conceptualized before his death and executed posthumously at his direction. Every work on this list was fabricated at least once for an exhibition, installation, or other presentation. The number of works fabricated refers to the number of times the work was fabricated permanently and sold, gifted, or transferred to a collector, museum, or other party; works with 0 fabrications were only fabricated during Flavin's life temporarily for one or more exhibitions. Edition sizes refer to the number of editions of a work intended to be fabricated; Flavin often did not complete the number of intended editions and sometimes produced additional versions beyond the numbered edition, or produced works in multiples without an official numbered edition.

Abbreviations: NE = Non-editioned; CR = catalogue raisonné

=== 1960s ===
List of works by Dan Flavin - 1960s
Title	Year	Medium	Dimensions	Edition size	No. of works fabricated	Public collection(s)	2004 CR no.	Notes	Ref
icon I (the heart) (to the light of Sean McGovern which blesses everyone)	1961-1962	Oil on cold gesso on Masonite and pine, and red fluorescent light	25 1/8 × 25 1/8 × 4 5/8 in (63.8 × 63.8 × 11.9 cm)	NE	1		1		
icon II (the mystery) (to John Reeves)	1961	Oil on cold acrylic gesso on Masonite and pine, porcelain receptacle, pull chain, and amber "Firelogs Vacuum" incandescent bulb	25 1/8 × 25 1/8 × 4 5/8 in (63.8 × 63.8 × 11.9 cm)	NE	1		2		
icon III (blood) (the blood of a martyr)	1962	Oil and linoleum over cold acrylic gesso on Masonite and pine, red incandescent light bulb, and red fluorescent light	34 × 25 × 6 in (86.4 × 63.5 × 15.2 cm)	NE	1	Judd Foundation, New York	3		
icon IV (the pure land) (to David John Flavin [1933–1962])	1962-1969	Formica and daylight fluorescent light	44 1/2 × 44 1/2 × 11 1/8 in (113 × 113 × 28.6 cm)	NE	1	National Gallery of Canada, Ottawa	4		
icon V (Coran's Broadway Flesh)	1962	Oil on cold gesso on Masonite, porcelain receptacles, pull chains, and clear incandescent "candle" bulbs	31 5/8 × 31 5/8 × 9 7/8 in (80.5 × 80.5 × 25.1 cm)	NE	1		5		
icon VI (Ireland dying) (to Louis Sullivan)	1962-1963	Oil on Masonite, painted steel receptacles, glass cap, red incandescent bulb, and socket disc flasher	25 3/4 × 25 11/16 × 10 1/4 in (65.4 × 65.2 × 26 cm)	NE	1	Judd Foundation, New York	6		
icon VII (via crucis)	1962-1964	Acrylic on engineered wood, fluorescent light	28 × 28 × 10 1/8 in (71.1 × 71.1 × 25.7 cm)	NE	1	Dia Art Foundation, Beacon, New York	7		
icon VIII (the dead nigger's icon) (to Blind Melon Jefferson)	1962-1963	Oil on Masonite, porcelain receptacles, pull chains, red incandescent bulbs, and socket disc flashers	25 1/8 × 25 1/8 × 10 7/16 in (63.8 × 63.8 × 26.5 cm)	NE	1		8		
East New York Shrines	1962-1966	Tin can, porcelain receptacle, pull chain, Aerolux bulb black glass beads	11 3/8 (30 cm) height, 4 1/2 in (11.5 cm) diameter	10	8		9		
Barbara Roses	1962-1965	White glazed terracotta flower pot, porcelain light fixture with pull chain containing an Aerolux Flowerlite light bulb	8 1/4 × 4 3/4 × 4 3/4 in (20.95 × 12.06 × 12.06 cm)	10	10	Smith College Museum of Art, Northampton, Massachusetts	10		
Roses	1962-1965	Terracotta flower pot, white plastic light sockets, Aerolux Flowerlite	8 1/2 in (21.5 cm) high, 5 1/2 in (14 cm) diameter	10	10	Museum of Modern Art, New York	11		
the Barbara Roses 3	1962-1971	Plastic flowerpots, porcelain fixtures, Aerolux Flowerlite, and light bulb	9 in (23 cm) high, 5 1/4 in (13.3 cm) diameter	10	10		12		
the diagonal of May 25, 1963 (to Constantin Brâncuși)	1963	Yellow fluorescent light	8 ft (244 cm) long diagonal	3	3	Dia Art Foundation, Beacon, New York	13	First entirely fluorescent sculpture.	
the diagonal of May 25, 1963	1963	Daylight fluorescent light	8 ft (244 cm) long diagonal	3	3		14		
the diagonal of May 25, 1963 (to Robert Rosenblum)	1963	Cool white fluorescent light	8 ft (244 cm) long diagonal	3	3	Metropolitan Museum of Art, New York; and Philadelphia Museum of Art	15		
the diagonal of May 25, 1963	1963	Warm white fluorescent light	8 ft (244 cm) long diagonal	3	2	Modern Art Museum of Fort Worth, Fort Worth, Texas	16		
the diagonal of May 25, 1963	1963	Soft white fluorescent light	8 ft (244 cm) long diagonal	3	2	Stedelijk Museum voor Actuele Kunst, Ghent	17		
the diagonal of May 25, 1963	1963	Blue fluorescent light	8 ft (244 cm) long diagonal	3	3	San Francisco Museum of Modern Art	18		
the diagonal of May 25, 1963	1963	Green fluorescent light	8 ft (244 cm) long diagonal	3	3		19		
the diagonal of May 25, 1963	1963	Pink fluorescent light	8 ft (244 cm) long diagonal	3	3		20		
the diagonal of May 25, 1963	1963	Red fluorescent light	8 ft (244 cm) long diagonal	3	3	Pinault Collection, Paris	21		
three fluorescent tubes	1963	Yellow and red fluorescent light on acrylic on Masonite and pine	49 × 10 × 6 1/2 in (124 × 25.4 × 16.5 cm)	NE	1		22		
one of May 27, 1963	1963	Red fluorescent and incandescent light on acrylic on Masonite and pine	8 × 48 × 6 1/2 in (20 × 122 × 16.5 cm)	NE	1	Art Institute of Chicago	23		
the nominal three (to William of Ockham)	1963	Cool white fluorescent light	8 ft (244 cm) high	3	3	Dia Art Foundation, Beacon, New York	24		
the nominal three (to William of Ockham)	1963	Cool white fluorescent light	6 ft (183 cm) high	3	3	Museo Nacional Centro de Arte Reina Sofía, Madrid; and Parrish Art Museum, Water Mill, New York	25		
the nominal three (to William of Ockham)	1963	Daylight fluorescent light	8 ft (244 cm) high	3	3		26		
the nominal three (to William of Ockham)	1963	Daylight fluorescent light	6 ft (183 cm) high	3	3	Solomon R. Guggenheim Museum, New York	27		
untitled	1963	Green fluorescent light	8 ft (244 cm) high	5	4	Louis Vuitton Foundation, Paris	28		
red out of a corner (to Annina)	1963	Red fluorescent light	8 ft (244 cm) high	3	3		29		
pink out of a corner (to Jasper Johns)	1963	Pink fluorescent light	8 ft (244 cm) high	3	3	Museum of Modern Art, New York	30		
untitled (to Charles Cowles)	1963	Daylight and blue fluorescent light	8 ft (244 cm) high	5	4	Museum of Contemporary Art, Los Angeles	31		
untitled (for Charlotte and Jim Brooks) 6	1963	Ultraviolet and blue fluorescent light	8 ft (244 cm) wide	3	3	Walker Art Center, Minneapolis	32	Originally exhibited as untitled	
four red horizontals (to Sonja)	1963	Red fluorescent light	8 ft (244 cm) wide	5	3		33		
untitled	1963–1966	Cool white and warm white fluorescent light	10 ft (305 cm) high	3	1		34		
alternate diagonals of March 2, 1964 (to Don Judd)	1964	Red and yellow fluorescent light	12 ft (366 cm) long diagonal	3	3	Museum of Contemporary Art Chicago; and Pinault Collection, Paris	35		
alternate diagonals of March 2, 1964 (to Don Judd)	1964	Daylight and cool white fluorescent light	12 ft (366 cm) long diagonal	3	2	Dallas Museum of Art; and Judd Foundation, Marfa, Texas	36		
alternate diagonals of March 2, 1964 (to Don Judd)	1964	Cool white fluorescent light	12 ft (366 cm) long diagonal	3	2		37		
alternate diagonals of March 2, 1964 (to Don Judd)	1964	Daylight fluorescent light	12 ft (366 cm) long diagonal	3	3	Louis Vuitton Foundation, Paris	38		
daylight and cool white (to Sol LeWitt	1964	Daylight and cool white fluorescent light	8 ft (244 cm) high	3	2		39		
untitled (to Henri Matisse)	1964	Pink, yellow, blue and green fluorescent light	8 ft (244 cm) high	3	3	Solomon R. Guggenheim Museum, New York	40		
untitled (to Henri Matisse)	1964	Pink, yellow, blue and green fluorescent light	4 ft (122 cm) high	5	3		41		
untitled (to Mr. and Mrs. Guiseppe Agrati)	1964	Pink, daylight, green, and yellow fluorescent light	8 ft (244 cm) high	3	3		42		
untitled (to Mr. and Mrs. Guiseppe Agrati)	1964	Pink, daylight, green, and yellow fluorescent light	4 ft (122 cm) high	5	3		43		
untitled (to Mr. and Mrs. Thomas Inch)	1964	Pink, daylight, cool white, and yellow fluorescent light	8 ft (244 cm) high	3	3	Crystal Bridges Museum of American Art, Bentonville, Arkansas	44		
untitled (to Mr. and Mrs. Thomas Inch)	1964	Pink, daylight, cool white, and yellow fluorescent light	4 ft (122 cm) high	5	3		45		
untitled (to Philip Johnson)	1964	Pink, green, blue, and red fluorescent light	8 ft (244 cm) high	3	3	Pinault Collection, Paris	46		
"a leaning diagonal" of March 27, 1964 (to David Smith)	1964	Cool white fluorescent light	8 ft (244 cm) long, leaning	NE	1		47		
untitled	1964	Cool white and daylight fluorescent light	8 ft (244 cm) high	NE	0		48	Originally produced for sale at the Kornblee Gallery, this work was purchased and returned before being dismantled.	
untitled	1964	Cool white fluorescent light	8 ft (244 cm) high	NE	1	Whitney Museum, New York	49		
untitled	1964	Cool white deluxe fluorescent light	Approx. 14 ft (427 cm) long	3	1		50		
untitled	1964	Yellow and daylight fluorescent light	8 ft (244 cm) high	3	2		51		
red and green alternatives (to Sonja)	1964	Green and red fluorescent light	8 ft (244 cm) wide	3	4		52		
red and green alternatives (to Sonja)	1964	Green and red fluorescent light	4 ft (122 cm) wide	5	3		53		
a primary picture	1964	Red, yellow, and blue fluorescent light	2 ft (61 cm) high, 4 ft (122 cm) wide	3	3	Glenstone, Potomac, Maryland	54		
Ursula's one and two picture	1964	Ultraviolet fluorescent lights	2 ft (61 cm) high, 4 ft (122 cm) wide	3	1	Villa Panza, Varese, Italy (permanent loan to Fondo Ambiente Italiano, collection of Solomon R. Guggenheim Museum, New York)	55		
Untitled	1964	Cool white fluorescent light	2 ft (61 cm) high, 4 ft (122 cm) wide	NE	1		56		
gold, pink and red, red	1964	Yellow, pink, and red fluorescent light	8 ft (244 cm) long	3	2	Dia Art Foundation, Beacon, New York; and Villa Panza, Varese, Italy (permanent loan to Fondo Ambiente Italiano, collection of Solomon R. Guggenheim Museum, New York)	57		
"monument" 1 for V. Tatlin	1964	Cool white fluorescent light	8 ft (244 cm) high	5	5	Dia Art Foundation, Beacon, New York; Museum of Modern Art, New York; and Pinakothek der Moderne, Munich	58	First of fifty works in the series dedicated to Vladimir Tatlin.	
"monument" 7 for V. Tatlin	1964	Cool white fluorescent light	10 ft (305 cm) high	5	4	Dia Art Foundation, Beacon, New York; Moderna Museet, Stockholm; and Pinakothek der Moderne, Munich	59		
"monument" for V. Tatlin	1964	Cool white fluorescent light	10 ft (305 cm) high	5	3	Dia Art Foundation, Beacon, New York; and Pinault Collection, Paris	60		
"monument" for V. Tatlin	1964-1965	Cool white fluorescent light	8 ft (244 cm) high	5	5	Louis Vuitton Foundation, Paris	61		
"monument" for V. Tatlin	1964	Cool white fluorescent light	8 ft (244 cm) high	5	3	Dia Art Foundation, Beacon, New York	62		
"monument" for V. Tatlin	1964	Cool white fluorescent light	8 ft (244 cm) high	5	4	Dia Art Foundation, Beacon, New York	63		
"monument" for V. Tatlin	1964	Cool white fluorescent light	8 ft (244 cm) high	5	3	Art Institute of Chicago; and Dia Art Foundation, Beacon, New York	64		
"monument" for V. Tatlin	1964	Cool white fluorescent light	8 ft (244 cm) high	5	4	Museum of Fine Arts, Boston	65		
"monument" for V. Tatlin	1964	Cool white fluorescent light	11 ft (335 cm) high	5	4	Dia Art Foundation, Beacon, New York	66		
"monument" for V. Tatlin	1964	Cool white fluorescent light	8 ft (244 cm) long diagonal	5	0		67		
"monument" for V. Tatlin	1964	Cool white fluorescent light	14 ft (427 cm) wide	5	1	Dia Art Foundation, Beacon, New York	68		
untitled	1964	Red and yellow fluorescent light	8 ft (244 cm) wide	5	6	Sheldon Museum of Art, Lincoln, Nebraska	69		
untitled	1964	Yellow and red fluorescent light	8 ft (244 cm) wide	5	1		70		
untitled	1964-1970	Yellow and red fluorescent light	4 ft (122 cm) wide	NE	0		71		
untitled	1964	Daylight, cool white, and warm white fluorescent light	Five sections, 5 ft (152 cm) wide each	5	2	Royal Museums of Fine Arts of Belgium, Brussels	72		
untitled	1964	Cool white and daylight fluorescent light	5 ft (152 cm) wide	NE	1		73	Identical to the second section of untitled (1964) [CR no. 72].	
untitled	1964	Ultraviolet and blue fluorescent light	8 ft (244 cm) wide	NE	0		74	Originally realized for an exhibition at Dwan Gallery in 1968	
untitled	1964	Ultraviolet and blue fluorescent light	4 ft (122 cm) wide	5	3		75		
untitled	1964	Ultraviolet fluorescent light	4 ft (122 cm) wide	5	2		76		
untitled	1964-1974	Pink fluorescent light	8 ft (244 cm) wide	5	1	Yale University Art Gallery, New Haven, Connecticut	77		
untitled	1964-1974	Red and pink fluorescent light	8 ft (244 cm) wide	5	2		78		
untitled	1964-1974	Yellow and pink fluorescent light	8 ft (244 cm) wide	5	1		79		
untitled	1964-1974	Blue and pink fluorescent light	8 ft (244 cm) wide	5	2		80		
untitled	1964-1974	Green and pink fluorescent light	8 ft (244 cm) wide	5	2	Museum Brandhorst, Munich	81		
untitled (for Charlotte and Jim Brooks) 1	1964	Pink and blue fluorescent light	8 ft (244 cm) wide	5	0		82		
untitled (for Charlotte and Jim Brooks) 2	1964	Red and blue fluorescent light	8 ft (244 cm) wide	5	1		83		
untitled (for Charlotte and Jim Brooks) 3	1964	Yellow and blue fluorescent light	8 ft (244 cm) wide	5	2	Modern Art Museum of Fort Worth, Fort Worth, Texas	84		
untitled (for Charlotte and Jim Brooks) 4	1964	Blue fluorescent light	8 ft (244 cm) wide	5	0		85		
untitled (for Charlotte and Jim Brooks) 5	1964	Green and blue fluorescent light	8 ft (244 cm) wide	5	0		86		
untitled (for Charlotte and Jim Brooks) 7	1964	Pink and blue fluorescent light	4 ft (122 cm) wide	5	3		87		
cool white along and down	1964-1966	Daylight fluorescent light	8 ft (244 cm) wide, 4 ft (244 cm) long, leaning	NE	0		88		
untitled	1964	Ultraviolet fluorescent light	4 ft (122 cm) high	3	2		89		
untitled	1964	Red, yellow, and blue fluorescent light	4 ft (122 cm) high	5	1	Yale University Art Gallery, New Haven, Connecticut	90		
untitled	1965	Blue and ultraviolet fluorescent light	8 ft (244 cm) long, leaning	NE	0		91		
untitled	1965	Cool white fluorescent light	12 ft (366 cm) high, 4 ft (122 cm) wide, 4 ft (122 cm) deep	NE	0		92		
untitled	1965	Cool white fluorescent light	Unknown	NE	0		93	Installation in the fine arts building of Ohio State University	
Jill's red, red and gold	1965	Red and yellow fluorescent light	8 ft (244 cm) high	3	1		94		
Puerto Rican light (to Jeanie Blake)	1965	Red, pink, and yellow fluorescent light	4 ft (122 cm) high	3	4		95		
Puerto Rican light (to Jeanie Blake) 2	1965	Red, pink, and yellow fluorescent light	8 ft (244 cm) high	5	3	Dia Art Foundation, Beacon, New York; and Institute of Contemporary Art, Miami	96		
red around a corner	1965	Red fluorescent light	8 ft (244 cm) high	NE	0		97		
white around a corner	1965	Cool white fluorescent light	8 ft (244 cm) high	3	1		98		
mini-white (de-flowered abstract antidote to the Barbara Roses)	1965-1966	Acrylic on terracotta flowerpot, white plastic light socket, and white incandescent light	7 in (18 cm) high, 4 3/4 in (12 cm) diameter	10	6		99		
"monument" for V. Tatlin	1966-1969	Cool white fluorescent light	9 ft (274 cm) high	5	5	Dia Art Foundation, Beacon, New York; National Gallery of Australia, Canberra; and Pinakothek der Moderne, Munich	100		
"monument" for V. Tatlin	1966	Cool white fluorescent light	10 ft (305 cm) high	5	5	Dia Art Foundation, Beacon, New York; and Tate, London	101		
"monument" for V. Tatlin	1966	Cool white fluorescent light	12 ft (366 cm) high	5	4	National Gallery of Art, Washington, D.C.; and Philadelphia Museum of Art	102		
untitled	1966	Red and daylight fluorescent light	2 ft (61 cm) wide	NE	1		103		
untitled (to Frank Stella)	1966	Pink and yellow fluorescent light	2 ft (61 cm) high, 6 ft (183 cm) wide across a corner	3	2		104		
untitled (to Frank Stella)	1966	Pink and yellow fluorescent light	2 ft (61 cm) high, 4 ft (122 cm) wide across a corner	5	2		105		
standing pink and gold behind blue	1966	Blue, pink, and yellow fluorescent light	2 ft (61 cm) high, 6 ft (183 cm) wide across a corner	NE	1		106		
untitled	1966	Ultraviolet and blue fluorescent light	8 ft (244 cm) high, 2 ft (61 cm) wide across a corner	3	2		107		
monument 4 for those who have been killed in ambush (to P.K. who reminded me about death)	1966	Red fluorescent light	8 ft (244 cm) wide, 6 ft (183 cm) deep	3	3	Villa Panza, Varese, Italy (permanent loan to Fondo Ambiente Italiano, collection of Solomon R. Guggenheim Museum, New York)	108		
monument 4 for those who have been killed in ambush (to P.K. who reminded me about death)	1966	Red fluorescent light	8 ft (244 cm) wide, 8 ft (244 cm) deep	3	3	Dia Art Foundation, Beacon, New York; and National Gallery of Canada, Ottawa	109		
"monument" on the survival of Mrs. Reppin	1966	Warm white and red fluorescent light	2 ft (61 cm) high, 5 ft (152 cm) wide	3	3	Norton Simon Museum, Pasadena, California; and Van Abbemuseum, Eindhoven, Netherlands	110		
untitled (to Annette Borgmann)	1966	Yellow, pink, and blue fluorescent light	6 ft (183 cm) high, 4 ft (122 cm) wide	NE	1		111		
untitled (to Annette Borgmann)	1966-1968	Pink, blue, and yellow fluorescent lights	4 ft (122 cm) high, 2 ft (61 cm) wide	NE	1		112		
untitled (to Karin)	1966	Daylight, warm white, and cool white fluorescent light	10 ft (305 cm) long diagonal	3	2	Museum Kröller-Müller, Otterlo, Netherlands	113		
untitled	1966	Daylight fluorescent light	20 ft (610 cm) wide	NE	1		114		
untitled (to Ingrid Nibbe)	1966	Green fluorescent light	2 ft (61 cm) high, 4 ft (122 cm) wide, 4 ft (122 cm) long, leaning	3	3	Museum Kröller-Müller, Otterlo, Netherlands	115		
greens crossing greens (to Piet Mondrian who lacked green)	1966	Green fluorescent light	First section: 4 ft (122 cm) high × 20 ft (610 cm) wide; Second section: 2 ft (61 cm) high × 22 ft (670 cm) wide	NE	1	Solomon R. Guggenheim Museum, New York	116		
untitled	1966	Cool white fluorescent light	4 ft (122 cm) high, 18 ft (549 cm) wide, 6 ft (183 cm) long, leaning	NE	1	Museum Brandhorst, Munich	117		
untitled	1966	Cool white fluorescent light	8 ft (244 cm) wide across a corner	3	1		118		
untitled	1966	Cool white fluorescent light	14 ft (427 cm) wide	3	1		119		
untitled	1966	Cool white fluorescent light	8 ft (244 cm) square across a corner	NE	0		120		
untitled (to the "innovator" of Wheeling Peachblow)	1966-1968	Daylight, yellow, and pink fluorescent light	8 ft (244 cm) square across a corner	3	3	Museum of Modern Art, New York	121		
untitled (to the "innovator" of Wheeling Peachblow)	1966-1968	Daylight, yellow, and pink fluorescent light	4 ft (122 cm) square across a corner	5	4		122		
untitled (to Christina and Bruno)	1966-1971	Yellow fluorescent light	8 ft (244 cm) square across a corner	5	2	Dia Art Foundation, Beacon, New York	123		
untitled (to Janet and Allen)	1966-1971	Pink fluorescent light	8 ft (244 cm) square across a corner	5	2	Dia Art Foundation, Beacon, New York	124		
untitled (to Sabine and Holger)	1966-1971	Red fluorescent light	8 ft (244 cm) square across a corner	5	3	Dia Art Foundation, Beacon, New York	125		
untitled (to Karin and Walther)	1966-1971	Blue fluorescent light	8 ft (244 cm) square across a corner	5	3	Dia Art Foundation, Beacon, New York	126		
untitled (to Katharina and Christoph)	1966-1971	Green fluorescent light	8 ft (244 cm) square across a corner	5	2	Dia Art Foundation, Beacon, New York	127		
untitled (to Pia and Franz)	1966-1971	Warm white fluorescent light	8 ft (244 cm) square across a corner	5	1		128		
untitled (to Heidi and Uwe)	1966-1971	Cool white fluorescent light	8 ft (244 cm) square across a corner	5	1	Dia Art Foundation, Beacon, New York	129		
untitled (to Barbara and Joost)	1966-1971	Daylight fluorescent light	8 ft (244 cm) square across a corner	5	1	Dia Art Foundation, Beacon, New York	130		
untitled (to Thordis and Heiner)	1966-1971	Soft white fluorescent light	8 ft (244 cm) square across a corner	5	2	Dia Art Foundation, Beacon, New York	131		
untitled	1966	Cool white fluorescent light	8 ft (244 cm) high	NE	1		132		
untitled	1966	Daylight and cool white fluorescent light	8 ft (244 cm) high	5	2		133		
untitled (to Heiner Friedrich)	1966-1968	Cool white and daylight fluorescent light	Using 5-foot (152 cm) fixtures: 6 ft (183 cm) high, 5 ft (183 cm) wide across a corner; Using 4-foot (122 cm) fixtures: 5 ft (152 cm) high, 4 ft (122 cm) wide across a corner	NE	0		134		
untitled (to the "last war," the final one) 4	1966-1976	Red and green fluorescent light	2 ft (61 cm) high, 8 ft (244 cm) wide across a corner	5	0		135		
untitled	1966-1967	Cool white fluorescent light	8 ft (244 cm) high	3	1		136		
untitled	1966-1969	Daylight fluorescent light	8 ft (244 cm) high	NE	0		137		
"monument" for V. Tatlin	1967	Cool white fluorescent light	8 ft (244 cm) high	5	3	Colección Jumex, Mexico City	138		
"monument" for V. Tatlin	1967	Cool white fluorescent light	8 ft (244 cm) high	5	0		139		
"monument" for V. Tatlin	1967	Cool white fluorescent light	8 ft (244 cm) high	5	5		140		
"monument" for V. Tatlin	1967	Cool white fluorescent light	8 ft (244 cm) high	5	2		141		
"monument" for V. Tatlin	1967	Cool white fluorescent light	8 ft (244 cm) high	5	3	Dia Art Foundation, Beacon, New York; and Hirshhorn Museum and Sculpture Garden, Smithsonian Institution, Washington, D.C.	142		
"monument" for V. Tatlin	1967	Cool white fluorescent light	8 ft (244 cm) high	5	0		143		
"monument" for V. Tatlin	1967	Cool white fluorescent light	8 ft (244 cm) high	5	0		144		
"monument" for V. Tatlin	1967	Cool white fluorescent light	8 ft (244 cm) high	5	1	Louis Vuitton Foundation, Paris	145		
"monument" for V. Tatlin	1967	Cool white fluorescent light	8 ft (244 cm) high	5	0		146		
"monument" for V. Tatlin	1967	Cool white fluorescent light	8 ft (244 cm) high	5	0		147		
untitled	1967	Cool white fluorescent light	8 ft (244 cm) high	NE	0		148		
untitled	1967	Cool white fluorescent light	8 ft (244 cm) high	NE	0		149		
untitled	1967	Cool white fluorescent light	8 ft (244 cm) high	NE	0		150		
untitled	1967	Cool white fluorescent light	8 ft (244 cm) high	NE	0		151		
untitled	1967	Green fluorescent light	8 ft (244 cm) modules; six total on three walls	NE	0		152		
alternating pink and "gold"	1967	Pink and yellow fluorescent light	8 ft (244 cm) high; fifty-four lamps on six walls of variable lengths	NE	0		153		
alternating pink and yellow (to Joseph Halmy)	1967-1969	Pink and yellow fluorescent light	Dimensions variable	NE	0		154		
"monument" for V. Tatlin	1968	Cool white fluorescent light	8 ft (244 cm) wide	5	1		155		
"monument" for V. Tatlin	1968	Cool white fluorescent light	14 ft (427 cm) wide	5	4		156		
"monument" for V. Tatlin	1968	Cool white fluorescent light	14 ft (427 cm) wide	5	1		157		
"monument" for V. Tatlin	1968	Cool white fluorescent light	14 ft (427 cm) wide	5	1	Dia Art Foundation, Beacon, New York	158		
"monument" for V. Tatlin	1968	Cool white fluorescent light	8 ft (244 cm) high	5	4	Dia Art Foundation, Beacon, New York; and National Gallery of Art, Washington, D.C.	159		
"monument" for V. Tatlin	1968	Cool white fluorescent light	8 ft (244 cm) high	5	2		160		
"monument" for V. Tatlin	1968	Cool white fluorescent light	8 ft (244 cm) high	5	0		161		
"monument" for V. Tatlin	1968	Cool white fluorescent light	8 ft (244 cm) high	5	0		162		
"monument" for V. Tatlin	1968	Cool white fluorescent light	8 ft (244 cm) high	5	3		163		
untitled	1968	Yellow fluorescent light	4 ft (122 cm) high, 11 ft (335 cm) wide	NE	1		164		
untitled	1968	Yellow fluorescent light	2 ft (61 cm) high, 4 ft (122 cm) wide across a corner	NE	1		165		
untitled	1968	Yellow fluorescent light	6 ft (183 cm) high	NE	1		166		
untitled	1968	Yellow fluorescent light	6 ft (183 cm) high	NE	1		167		
untitled	1968	Yellow fluorescent light	6 ft (183 cm) high	NE	1		168		
untitled	1968	Yellow fluorescent light	6 ft (183 cm) high	NE	1		169		
untitled	1968	Yellow fluorescent light	4 ft (122 cm), 2 ft (61 cm) deep	NE	1		170		
untitled	1968	Yellow fluorescent light	4 ft (122 cm), 2 ft (61 cm) deep	NE	1		171		
untitled	1968	Yellow fluorescent light	6 ft (183 cm) high	NE	1		172		
an artificial barrier of blue, red and blue fluorescent light (to Flavin Starbuck Judd)	1968	Red and blue fluorescent light	Modular units, each made of two 2-foot (61 cm) vertical fixtures and two 4-foot (122 cm) horizontal fixtures; length variable	3	2		173		
an artificial barrier of green fluorescent light (to Trudie and Enno Develing)	1968-1969	Green fluorescent light	Modular units, each made of two 4-foot (122 cm) vertical fixtures and two 4-foot (122 cm) horizontal fixtures; length variable	NE	0		174		
an artificial barrier of ultraviolet fluorescent light (to Trudie and Enno Develing)	1968-1969	Ultraviolet fluorescent light	Modular units, each made of two 2-foot (61 cm) vertical fixtures and two 2-foot (61 cm) horizontal fixtures; approx. 29 ft (8.84 m) long	NE	0		175		
untitled (affectionately, to Jay, enroute)	1968-1975	Ultraviolet fluorescent light	Modular units, each made of two 2-foot (61 cm) vertical fixtures and two 4-foot (122 cm) horizontal fixtures; approx. 43 ft 8 in (13.31 m) long	NE	0		176		
untitled	1968	Red and green fluorescent light	6 ft (183 cm) high	3	3		177		
untitled	1968	Red and green fluorescent light	10 ft (305 cm) high	3	1		178		
untitled	1968	Red and green fluorescent light	10 ft (305 cm) high	3	2	Villa Panza, Varese, Italy (permanent loan to Fondo Ambiente Italiano, collection of Solomon R. Guggenheim Museum, New York)	179		
untitled	1968	Red and yellow fluorescent light	6 ft (183 cm) high	3	3	Museum Brandhorst, Munich; and Museum of Modern Art, New York	180		
untitled	1968	Red and yellow fluorescent light	10 ft (305 cm) high	3	2	Museum Brandhorst, Munich	181		
untitled	1968	Red and yellow fluorescent light	10 ft (305 cm) high	3	3	Museum Boijmans Van Beuningen, Rotterdam; and Museum Brandhorst, Munich	182		
untitled	1968	Red and blue fluorescent light	6 ft (183 cm) high	3	3		183		
untitled	1968	Red and blue fluorescent light	10 ft (305 cm) high	3	2		184		
untitled	1968	Red and blue fluorescent light	10 ft (305 cm) high	3	2		185		
untitled	1968	Red and green fluorescent light	6 ft (183 cm) wide	3	2		186		
untitled	1968	Red, yellow, and blue fluorescent light	6 ft (183 cm) high	3	3		187		
untitled	1968-1969	Green, red, and yellow fluorescent light	4 ft (122 cm) high	3	2		188		
untitled	1968	Pink and ultraviolet fluorescent light	20 ft (610 cm) high	NE	0		189		
untitled	1968	Ultraviolet fluorescent light	2-ft (61 cm) vertical fixtures, 4-foot (122 cm) horizontal fixtures; size dependent on room	NE	1	Villa Panza, Varese, Italy (permanent loan to Fondo Ambiente Italiano, collection of Solomon R. Guggenheim Museum, New York)	190		
untitled	1968	Ultraviolet fluorescent light	Unknown	NE	0		191		
untitled	1968	Ultraviolet fluorescent light	Unknown	NE	0		192		
untitled	1968	Cool white and daylight fluorescent light	8 ft (244 cm) high, 2 ft (61 cm) wide across a corner	3	1		193		
untitled (to Dorothy and Roy Lichtenstein on not seeing anyone in the room)	1968	Cool white fluorescent light	8 ft (244 cm) high; sixteen fictures installed in a doorway measuring 8 × 11 ft (244 × 335 cm)	3	1	San Francisco Museum of Modern Art	194		
untitled (to Mr. and Mrs. Richard Fraenkel)	1968	Blue and red fluorescent light	4 ft (122 cm) high, 8 ft (244 cm) wide across a corner	NE	0		195		
"monument" for V. Tatlin	1969	Cool white fluorescent light	10 ft (305 cm) high	5	5	Detroit Institute of Arts; and Dia Art Foundation, Beacon, New York	196		
"monument" for V. Tatlin	1969	Cool white fluorescent light	8 ft (244 cm) high	5	3	Dia Art Foundation, Beacon, New York	197		
"monument" for V. Tatlin	1969	Cool white fluorescent light	8 ft (244 cm) high	5	4	Dia Art Foundation, Beacon, New York; and Stedelijk Museum Amsterdam	198		
"monument" for V. Tatlin	1969	Cool white fluorescent light	8 ft (244 cm) high	5	4	Museum of Contemporary Art, Los Angeles; and San Francisco Museum of Modern Art	199		
"monument" for V. Tatlin	1969	Cool white fluorescent light	8 ft (244 cm) high	5	4	Dia Art Foundation, Beacon, New York; Louis Vuitton Foundation, Paris; Walker Art Center, Minneapolis; and Whitney Museum, New York	200		
"monument" for V. Tatlin	1969-1970	Cool white fluorescent light	8 ft (244 cm) high	5	2	Scottish National Gallery of Modern Art, Edinburgh	201		
"monument" for V. Tatlin	1969-1970	Cool white fluorescent light	8 ft (244 cm) high	5	1		202		
"monument" for V. Tatlin	1969-1970	Cool white fluorescent light	8 ft (244 cm) high	5	4	Museum of Contemporary Art Tokyo; and National Gallery of Art, Washington, D.C.	203		
untitled	1969	Pink fluorescent light	8 ft (244 cm) high, leaning	3	3	Art Institute of Chicago; and Dia Art Foundation, Beacon, New York	204		
untitled (to Shirley and Jason)	1969	Pink and blue fluorescent light	8 ft (244 cm) high, leaning	3	3	Dia Art Foundation, Beacon, New York	205		
untitled	1969	Pink and green fluorescent light	8 ft (244 cm) high, leaning	3	3	Dia Art Foundation, Beacon, New York; and High Museum of Art, Atlanta	206		
untitled	1969	Pink and red fluorescent light	8 ft (244 cm) high, leaning	3	3	Dia Art Foundation, Beacon, New York	207		
untitled	1969	Pink and yellow fluorescent light	8 ft (244 cm) high, leaning	3	3	Dia Art Foundation, Beacon, New York	208		
untitled	1969	Pink and daylight fluorescent light	8 ft (244 cm) high, leaning	3	3	Dia Art Foundation, Beacon, New York	209		
untitled (to Paddy)	1969-1976	Blue and pink fluorescent light	4 ft (122 cm) high, leaning	5	1		210		
untitled (to Isobel)	1969-1976	Blue and green fluorescent light	4 ft (122 cm) high, leaning	5	1		211		
untitled	1969	Blue, daylight, cool white, and warm white fluorescent light	8 ft (244 cm) wide across a corner	5	2	Kunstmuseum Basel	212		
untitled	1969	Blue and green fluorescent light	8 ft (244 cm) wide across a corner	5	2		213		
untitled	1969	Blue, yellow, and pink fluorescent light	8 ft (244 cm) wide across a corner	5	2		214		
untitled	1969	Cool white and daylight fluorescent light	4 ft (122 cm) wide across a corner	5	2		215		
untitled	1969	Pink and green fluorescent light	6 ft (183 cm) high	Uneditioned	2		216		
untitled	1969	Daylight and cool white fluorescent light	6 ft (183 cm) high	Uneditioned	2		217		
untitled	1969	Daylight and cool white fluorescent light	4 ft (122 cm) wide	5	4		218		
untitled	1969	Red and blue fluorescent light	4 ft (122 cm) wide	NE	1		219		
untitled	1969	Red, yellow, and green fluorescent light	4 ft (122 cm) wide	5	2		220		
untitled	1969	Red and pink fluorescent light	4 ft (122 cm) wide	Uneditioned	2		221		
untitled	1969	Blue and red fluorescent light	2 ft (61 cm) high, 2 ft (61 cm) wide across a corner	Uneditioned	2		222		
untitled	1969	Blue, yellow, and pink fluorescent light	2 ft (61 cm) high, 2 ft (61 cm) wide across a corner	NE	1		223		
untitled	1969	Green, pink, and yellow fluorescent light	2 ft (61 cm) high, 2 ft (61 cm) wide across a corner	5	2		224		
untitled	1969	Cool white, daylight, and warm white fluorescent light	2 ft (61 cm) high, 2 ft (61 cm) wide across a corner	Uneditioned	2		225		
untitled	1969	Ultraviolet fluorescent light	Unknown	NE	1		226		
untitled	1969	Pink and green fluorescent light	8 ft (244 cm) high, 8 ft (244 cm) wide	NE	0		227		
untitled (to Bob and Pat Rohm)	1969	Red, green, and yellow fluorescent light	8 ft (244 cm) square across a corner	5	4		228		
untitled (to Bob and Pat Rohm)	1969-1970	Red, green, and yellow fluorescent light	4 ft (122 cm) square across a corner	5	3	Pinakothek der Moderne, Munich	229		
untitled (to dear, durable Sol from Stephen, Sonja and Dan) one	1969	Daylight and cool white fluorescent light	8 ft (244 cm) square across a corner	5	1	San Francisco Museum of Modern Art	230		
untitled (to dear, durable Sol from Stephen, Sonja and Dan) two	1969	Daylight and cool white fluorescent light	4 ft (244 cm) square across a corner	5	1	Walker Art Center, Minneapolis	231		
untitled (to Annette Carlozzi)	1969-1979	Ultraviolet fluorescent light	4 ft (244 cm) square across a corner	5	0		232		
untitled	1969	Daylight and cool white fluorescent light	Minimum 38 ft (11.6 m) wide	NE	0		233		
three sets of tangented arcs in daylight and cool white (to Jenny and Ira Licht)	1969	Daylight and cool white fluorescent light	Room size: 9 ft 6 in × 24 ft × 9 in × 37 ft 3 in (290 × 752 × 1135 cm)	NE	0		234		
untitled (to Jean Boggs)	1969	Green, blue, yellow, and red fluorescent light	8 ft high; placed in an acutely angled corner	NE	0		235		
untitled (to S.M. with all the admiration and love which I can sense and summon)	1969	Red, yellow, pink, and blue fluorescent light	Eight modular units, each 8 × 8 ft (244 × 244 cm) square, in a corridor measuring 9 ft 6 in × 8 ft × 64 ft 1 in (290 × 244 × 1953 cm)	NE	0		236		
untitled (to S.M.) 2	1969	Red, yellow, pink, and blue fluorescent light	Eight modular units, each 8 × 8 ft (244 × 244 cm) square, in a corridor measuring 9 ft 6 in × 8 ft × 64 ft 1 in (290 × 244 × 1953 cm)	NE	0		237		
untitled (to Heiner Friedrich)	1969	Ultraviolet fluorescent light	Room size: 9 ft 6 in × 33 ft 9 in × 40 ft 10 in (290 × 1030 × 1245 cm)	NE	0		238		
untitled	1969	Ultraviolet fluorescent light	Room size: approx. 22 × 21 ft (670 × 640 cm)	NE	0		239		
untitled (to Jane and Brydon Smith) 1	1969	Daylight and blue fluorescent light	8 ft (244 cm) high, 8 ft (244 cm) wide across a corner	NE	0		240		
untitled (to Jane and Brydon Smith) 2	1969	Daylight and blue fluorescent light	8 ft (244 cm) high, 8 ft (244 cm) wide across a corner	NE	0		241		
untitled	1969	Yellow and pink fluorescent light	2 ft (61 cm) high, 2 ft (61 cm) wide across a corner	3	3	Museum of Modern Art, New York	242		
untitled	1969	Blue and red fluorescent light	4 ft (122 cm) high, 4 ft (122 cm) wide across a corner	5	3	Tate Gallery, London	243		
untitled	1969	Blue and red fluorescent light	2 ft (61 cm) high, 2 ft (61 cm) wide across a corner	5	4		244		
untitled (to Sonja)	1969	Yellow and green fluorescent light	Left section: modular units, each with two 4-foot (122 cm) vertical fixtures and two 4-foot (122 cm horizontal fixtures); Right section: modular units, each with two 8-foot (244 cm) vertical fixtures and two 8-foot (244 cm horizontal fixtures)	NE	0		245		
untitled	1969	Pink and yellow fluorescent light	8 ft (244 cm) high, 2 ft (61 cm) wide across a corner	3	3		246		
untitled	1969	Yellow and pink fluorescent light	8 ft (244 cm) high, 2 ft (61 cm) wide across a corner	3	3		247		
untitled	1969	Yellow fluorescent light	4 ft (122 cm) wide	3	3	Norton Simon Museum, Pasadena, California	248		

=== 1970s ===
List of works by Dan Flavin - 1970s
Title	Year	Medium	Dimensions	Edition size	No. of works fabricated	Public collection(s)	2004 CR no.	Notes	Ref
"monument" for V. Tatlin	1970	Cool white fluorescent light	8 ft (244 cm) high	5	4	Dia Art Foundation, Beacon, New York	249		
"monument" for V. Tatlin	1970	Cool white fluorescent light	8 ft (244 cm) high	5	5	Louis Vuitton Foundation, Paris	250		
"monument" for V. Tatlin	1970	Cool white fluorescent light	8 ft (244 cm) high	5	0		251		
untitled (to Heiner Friedrich)	1970	Pink and green fluorescent light	16 ft (488 cm) high	3	0		252		
untitled (to Barbara Wool)	1970	Pink and red fluorescent light	4 ft (122 cm) high, 4 ft (122 cm) wide	3	3		253		
untitled (to Ira)	1970	Yellow and green fluorescent light	8 ft (244 cm) high, 2 ft (61 cm) wide across a corner	3	1		245		
untitled	1970	Blue and red fluorescent light	Modular units, each made of two 8-foot (244 cm) vertical fixtures and two 8-foot (244 cm) horizontal fixtures	3	2	Dia Art Foundation, Beacon, New York; and Judd Foundation, New York	255		
untitled (to the young woman and men murdered in Kent State and Jackson State Universities and to their fellow students who are yet to be killed)	1970	Red, green, and yellow fluorescent light	16 ft (488 cm) high, 2 ft (61 cm) wide across a corner	3	0		256		
untitled (to Marianne) one	1970	Blue and yellow fluorescent light	8 ft (244 cm) high, 2 ft (61 cm) wide across a corner	5	3	Museum of Contemporary Art San Diego	257		
untitled (to Elita and her baby, Cintra)	1970	Blue, red, and pink fluorescent light	2 ft (61 cm) high, 8 ft (244 cm) wide across a corner	3	2	Hood Museum of Art, Hanover, New Hampshire	258		
untitled	1970	Daylight and cool white fluorescent light	4 ft (122 cm) square across a corner	5	1		259		
untitled (to Barnett Newman to commemorate his simple problem, red, yellow, and blue)	1970	Yellow, blue, and red fluorescent light	8 ft (244 cm) wide across a corner, height variable	3	3	National Gallery of Art, Washington, D.C.; and Stedelijk Museum Amsterdam	260		
untitled (to Brad Gillaugh)	1970	Cool white, pink, and red fluorescent light	8 ft (244 cm) high	5	4		261		
untitled (to Ileana and Michael Sonnabend)	1970	Blue, yellow, and pink fluorescent light	8 ft (244 cm) wide across a corner	5	5	Saint Louis Art Museum	262		
untitled	1970	Blue and red fluorescent light	4 ft (122 cm) wide across a corner	5	7	Rhode Island School of Design Museum, Providence, Rhode Island	263		
untitled (to Jean-Christophe)	1970	Pink, green, blue, and red fluorescent light	4 ft (122 cm) high	5	5		264		
untitled (to Ward Jackson, an old friend and colleague who, when, during the Fall, 1957, I finally returned to New York from Washington and joined him to work together in this museum, kindly communicated)	1971	Daylight, pink, yellow, green, and blue fluorescent light	System of two modular units; First unit: four 2 ft (61 cm) horizontal fixtures and two 8 ft (244 cm) vertical fixtures; Second unit: two 8 ft (244 cm) fixtures, leaning, and one 2 ft (61 cm) horizontal fixture	NE	1	Solomon R. Guggenheim Museum, New York	265		
untitled (to Barnett Newman) one	1971	Yellow, red, and blue fluorescent light	8 ft (244 cm) high, 4 ft (122 cm) wide across a corner	5	1		266		
untitled (to Barnett Newman) two	1971	Yellow, red, and blue fluorescent light	8 ft (244 cm) high, 4 ft (122 cm) wide across a corner	5	3	San Francisco Museum of Modern Art	267		
untitled (to Barnett Newman) three	1971	Yellow, blue, and red fluorescent light	8 ft (244 cm) high, 4 ft (122 cm) wide across a corner	5	0		268		
untitled (to Barnett Newman) four	1971	Yellow, blue, and red fluorescent light	8 ft (244 cm) high, 4 ft (122 cm) wide across a corner	5	3		269		
untitled (to Annalee fondly) 2	1971	Green, pink, and yellow fluorescent light	8 ft (244 cm) wide across a corner	5	1	Nelson-Atkins Museum of Art, Kansas City, Missouri	270		
untitled (to Paolina)	1971	Red, yellow, pink, and blue fluorescent light	4 ft (122 cm) high, 2 ft (61 cm) wide across a corner	5	5		271		
untitled (to Paul Toner)	1971	Yellow and green fluorescent light	ft (122 cm) wide	5	3	Winnipeg Art Gallery	272		
untitled (to Barbara Nüsse)	1971	Blue and pink fluorescent light	2 ft (122 cm) high, 2 ft (122 cm) wide across a corner	50	21	National Gallery of Australia, Canberra	273		
untitled (to Mary Lee Haldeman)	1971	Ultraviolet and pink fluorescent light	4 ft (122 cm) square across a corner	5	0		274		
untitled (to Janie Lee) one	1971	Blue, pink, yellow, and green fluorescent light	8 ft (244 cm) across a corner	5	3		275		
untitled (to Janie Lee) two	1971	Blue, green, yellow, and pink fluorescent light	8 ft (244 cm) across a corner	5	2		276		
untitled (to Virginia Dwan) 1	1971	Blue, red, pink, and yellow fluorescent light	8 ft (244 cm) across a corner	5	3		277		
untitled (to Virginia Dwan) 2	1971	Blue, yellow, pink, and red fluorescent light	8 ft (244 cm) across a corner	5	1		278		
untitled (to Elizabeth and Richard Koshalek)	1971	Blue, pink, yellow, and green fluorescent light	Nine modular units, each 8 × 8 ft (244 × 244 cm) square, in a corrido measuring 8 ft (244 cm) wide, 74 ft (22.6 m) long, 6 ft 6 in (198 cm) high at one end and 9 ft 9 in (297 cm) high at the other end	NE	0		279		
untitled (to Johnny W.)	1971	Pink, yellow, and green fluorescent light	8 ft (244 cm) high, 2 ft (61 cm) wide across a corner	5	1		280		
untitled	1971	Daylight and cool white fluorescent light	8 ft (244 cm) high, 2 ft (61 cm) wide across a corner	5	0		281		
untitled (to Donna) 1	1971	Blue, pink, and yellow fluorescent light	8 ft (244 cm) high, 8 ft (244 cm) wide across a corner	5	1		282		
untitled (To Donna) 2	1971	Yellow, pink, and blue fluorescent light	8 ft (244 cm) high, 8 ft (244 cm) wide across a corner	5	2	Portland Art Museum, Portland, Oregon	283		
untitled (To Donna) 3	1971	Pink, yellow, and blue fluorescent light	8 ft (244 cm) high, 8 ft (244 cm) wide across a corner	5	1		284		
untitled (To Donna) 4	1971	Pink, yellow, and blue fluorescent light	8 ft (244 cm) square across a corner	5	1		285		
untitled (To Donna) 4a	1971	Pink, blue, and yellow fluorescent light	8 ft (244 cm) square across a corner	5	0		286		
untitled (To Donna) 5	1971	Yellow, pink, and blue fluorescent light	8 ft (244 cm) square across a corner	5	4		287		
untitled (To Donna) 5a	1971	Yellow, blue, and pink fluorescent light	8 ft (244 cm) square across a corner	5	4	Musée National d'Art Moderne, Centre Pompidou, Paris	288		
untitled	1971	Yellow, blue, and pink fluorescent light	4 ft (122 cm) square across a corner	5	0		289		
untitled (To Donna) 6	1971	Blue, pink, and yellow fluorescent light	8 ft (244 cm) square across a corner	5	2	Buffalo AKG Art Museum, Buffalo, New York	290		
untitled (To Donna) 6a	1971	Blue, yellow, and pink fluorescent light	8 ft (244 cm) square across a corner	5	2		291		
untitled	1971	Blue, yellow, and pink fluorescent light	4 ft (122 cm) square across a corner	5	0		292		
untitled	1971	Blue and red fluorescent light	8 ft (244 cm) square across a corner	5	1		293		
untitled	1971	Green fluorescent light	Two sections, 20 ft (810 cm) long each	NE	0		294		
untitled (to Cy Twombly) 1	1972	Cool white and daylight fluorescent light	8 ft (244 cm) wide across a corner	5	1	Mumok, Vienna	295		
untitled (to Cy Twombly) 2	1972	Cool white and daylight fluorescent light	4 ft (122 cm) wide across a corner	5	1		296		
untitled (to Cy Twombly) 3	1972	Cool white and daylight fluorescent light	2 ft (61 cm) wide across a corner	5	1		297		
untitled (to Marlene and Michael Venezia)	1972	Ultraviolet fluorescent light	Twenty sections, 4 ft (122 cm) long diagonal each	NE	0		298		
untitled (to Seymour Knox and Gordon Smith)	1972	Cool white and daylight fluorescent light	Four sections; Two sections approx. 26 ft (793 cm) high; Two sections approx. 14 ft (427 cm) high	NE	0		299		
untitled (to Mies van der Rohe for his "Barcelona Pavilion") (and to Richard Nickel who observed, believed in, recorded, preserved somewhat and communicated as best he could the thought and work of Chicago's architects, losing his life accordingly affectionately within the disastrous commercial destruction of Louis Sullivan's great Stock Exchange Building)	1972	Cool white and daylight fluorescent light	Four sections, 14 ft (427 cm) high each	NE	0		300		
untitled (to Dominique and John de Menil)	1972	Cool white and daylight fluorescent light	Four sections, 12 ft (366 cm) high each	NE	0		301		
untitled (to a man, George McGovern) 1	1972	Cool white and daylight fluorescent light	10 ft (305 cm) high, 10 ft (305 cm) wide	3	2	Van Abbemuseum, Eindhoven, Netherlands	302		
untitled (to a man, George McGovern) 2	1972	Warm white fluorescent light	10 ft (305 cm) high, 10 ft (305 cm) wide	3	2	Dia Art Foundation, Beacon, New York	303		
untitled (to Tina and Christoph and their Palladio)	1972-1973	Cool white and warm white fluorescent light	Dimensions variable	NE	1		304		
untitled	1972	Daylight and warm white fluorescent light	At least two sections, approx. 20 ft (610 cm) high	NE	0		305		
untitled (to Debbie Hay, moving anyway)	1972	Cool white and warm white fluorescent light	2 ft (61 cm) high, 20 ft (610 cm) wide	NE	0		306		
untitled (for Lois, with the affection of years)	1972	Warm white and daylight fluorescent light	2 ft (61 cm) high, 50 ft (15.3 m) wide	NE	0		307		
untitled (to Jim Shaeufele) 1	1972	Cool white fluorescent light	9 ft (274 cm) high	3	1	Dia Art Foundation	308		
untitled (to Jim Shaeufele) 2	1972	Daylight fluorescent light	16 ft (488 cm) high	3	1	Dia Art Foundation	309		
untitled (to Jim Shaeufele) 3	1972	Warm white fluorescent light	10 ft (305 cm) high	3	1	Dia Art Foundation	310		
untitled (to Eleanor McGovern)	1972	Blue, pink, and yellow fluorescent light	8 ft (244 cm) high, leaning	5	4		311		
untitled (to Helen Winkler)	1972	Cool white and warm white fluorescent light	8 ft (244 cm) square across a corner	5	1		312		
untitled (to Kay Foster)	1972	Daylight fluorescent light	8 ft (244 cm) high, 2 ft (61 cm) wide across a corner	5	0		313		
untitled	1972	Cool white and daylight fluorescent light	8 ft (244 cm) high	5	0		314		
untitled	1972	Cool white, daylight, and warm white fluorescent light	8 ft (244 cm) high	5	0		315		
untitled (in memory of Urs Graf)	1972	Yellow, pink, green, and blue fluorescent light	Eight sections; Four sections: 8 ft (244 cm) high; Four sections: 44 ft (12.3 m) high	NE	1	Kunstmuseum, Basel, Switzerland	316		
untitled	1972	Cool white and daylight fluorescent light	2 ft (61 cm) high, 2 ft (61 cm) wide across a corner	5	0		317		
untitled	1972	Blue and red fluorescent light	2 ft (61 cm) wide across a corner	5	3		318		
untitled (to Jan and Ron Greenberg)	1972-1973	Yellow and green fluorescent light	8 ft (244 cm) high, in a corridor measuring 8 ft (244 cm) high and 8 ft (244 cm) wide, length variable	3	2	Dia Art Foundation, Beacon, New York	319		
untitled (to "Buster" May)	1972-1974	Blue and red fluorescent light	8 ft (244 cm) high, in a corridor measuring 8 ft (244 cm) high and 8 ft (244 cm) wide; length variable	3	1		320		
untitled (to Barry, Mike, Chuck and Leonard)	1972-1975	Yellow and pink fluorescent light	8 ft (244 cm) high, in a corridor measuring 8 ft (244 cm) high and 8 ft (244 cm) wide; length variable	3	1		321		
untitled	1973	Daylight and cool white fluorescent light	Two sections, 48 ft (14.64 m) long each	NE	0		322		
untitled (to Emily)	1973	Warm white, soft white, daylight, and cool white fluorescent light	In a corrido measuring 8 × 8 × 25 ft (244 × 244 × 760 cm)	NE	0		323		
untitled (to Alexandra)	1973	Pink fluorescent light	Modular units, each made of two 4-foot (122 cm) vertical fixtures and four 2-foot (61 cm) horizontal fixtures; overall length at least 36 ft (11 m)	NE	0		324		
untitled (to Pat and Bob Rohm)	1973	Red, yellow, and green fluorescent light	8 ft (244 cm) high, 2 ft (61 cm) wide across a corner	5	3		325		
untitled (to Barnett Newman)	1973	Yellow, red, and blue fluorescent light	8 ft (244 cm) high, 2 ft (61 cm) wide across a corner	5	3	Seattle Art Museum	326		
untitled (To Donna)	1973	Blue, yellow, and pink fluorescent light	8 ft (244 cm) high, 2 ft (61 cm) wide across a corner	5	3	Seattle Art Museum	327		
untitled (to Kay Foster)	1973	Cool white, daylight, and warm white fluorescent light	8 ft (244 cm) high, 2 ft (61 cm) wide across a corner	5	0		328		
untitled (in memory of Barbara Schiller) 1	1973	Cool white and warm white fluorescent light	22 ft (670 cm) wide	NE	0		329		
untitled (in memory of Barbara Schiller) 2	1973	Cool white and warm white fluorescent light	46 ft (14 m) wide	NE	0		330		
untitled (in memory of Barbara Schiller)	1973	White fluorescent light	12 ft (366 cm) wide	NE	0		331		
the blue and then, the red (to Kathan Brown)	1973	Blue and red fluorescent light	14 ft (427 cm) high	NE	0		332		
untitled (to you, Heiner, with admiration and affection)	1973	Green fluorescent light	Modular units, each 4 ft (122 cm) high, 4 ft (122 cm) wide; length variable	NE	1	Dia Art Foundation, Beacon, New York; and Pinakothek der Moderne, Munich	333		
untitled (to Saskia, Sixtina, Thordis)	1973	Pink, yellow, green, and blue fluorescent light	8 ft (244 cm) high, width variable	NE	1	Pinault Collection, Paris	334		
untitled	1973	Cool white and warm white fluorescent light	6 ft (163 cm) high	3	1		335		
untitled	1973	Cool white and warm white fluorescent light	10 ft (305 cm) wide	3	0		336		
untitled	1973	Warm white fluorescent light	6 ft (183 cm) wide	5	0		337		
untitled	1973	Warm white and cool white fluorescent light	4 ft (122 cm) high, 4 ft (122 cm) wide across a corner	5	0		338		
untitled (to Barbara Lipper)	1973	Blue, red, and pink fluorescent light	8 ft (244 cm) square across a corner	5	1		339		
untitled (to Barbara Lipper)	1973	Blue, red, and pink fluorescent light	4 ft (122 cm) square across a corner	5	5		340		
untitled (to Fraziska Heuss, with pride and affection)	1973	Warm white and cool white fluorescent light	12 ft (366 cm) high, 16 ft (488 cm) wide	NE	0		341		
untitled	1973	Daylight and warm white fluorescent light	Left section: 9 ft (274 cm) wide; Right section: 3 ft (91 cm) high, 8 ft (244 cm) wide	NE	0		342		
untitled (to Bill and Roy)	1973	Daylight and warm white fluorescent light	Left section: 2 ft (61 cm) high, 21 ft (640 cm) wide; Right section: 2 ft (61 cm) high, 19 ft (579 cm) wide	NE	0		343		
untitled (fondly, to Kay, John and Cosimo)	1973	Daylight and warm white fluorescent light	Two sections, each 15 ft (457 cm) high, 2 ft (61 cm) wide	NE	0		344		
untitled (for dear Marge, all the way to L.A.)	1973	Daylight and red fluorescent light	Two sections, 20 ft (305 cm) high, 2 ft (61 cm) wide each	NE	0		345		
untitled	1973	Pink, red, and yellow fluorescent light	Two sections, 8 ft (244 cm) high, 8 ft (244 cm) wide each	NE	0		346		
untitled	1973	Daylight and warm white fluorescent light	Left section: 2 ft (61 cm) high, 11 ft (335 cm) wide; Right section: 23 ft (781 cm) wide	NE	0		347		
untitled (to Jan and Ron Greenberg) 2	1973-1981	Yellow and green fluorescent light	8 ft (244 cm) high, in a corridor measuring 8 ft (244 cm) high and 8 ft (244 cm) wide	3	0		348		
"monument" for V. Tatlin	1974	Cool white fluorescent light	10 ft (305 cm) high	5	1	Dia Art Foundation, Beacon, New York	349		
"monument" for V. Tatlin	1974	Cool white fluorescent light	10 ft (305 cm) high	5	3	Dia Art Foundation, Beacon, New York; Musée National d'Art Moderne, Centre Pompidou, Paris; and Scottish National Gallery of Modern Art, Edinburgh	350		
untitled	1974	Pink, green, and blue fluorescent light	4 ft (122 cm) high, 4 ft (122 cm) wide across a corner	5	5		351		
untitled	1974	Cool white fluorescent light	First section: 11 ft (335 cm) wide; Section section: 11 ft (335 cm) high, 25 ft (760 cm) wide	NE	0		352		
untitled (in memory of my father D. Nicholas Flavin)	1974	Daylight fluorescent light	Modular units, each 2 ft (61 cm) high, 1 ft (30.5 cm) wide; Overall size variable	3	0		353		
untitled (to Helga and Carlo, with respect and affection)	1974	Blue fluorescent light	Modular units, each made with two 4-foot (122 cm) vertical fixtures and three 4-foot (122 cm) horizontal fixtures; Approx. 60 ft (18.3 m) long	NE	1	Hirshhorn Museum and Sculpture Garden, Smithsonian Institution, Washington, D.C.	354		
untitled	1974	Green fluorescent light	Modular units, each made with two 4-foot (122 cm) vertical fixtures and three 4-foot (122 cm) horizontal fixtures; At least 76 ft (23 m) long	NE	0		355		
untitled	1974	Pink fluorescent light	Modular units, each made with two 4-foot (122 cm) vertical fixtures and three 4-foot (122 cm) horizontal fixtures; At least 62 ft (19 m) long	NE	0		356		
untitled	1974	Yellow fluorescent light	Modular units, each made with two 4-foot (122 cm) vertical fixtures and three 4-foot (122 cm) horizontal fixtures; At least 72 ft (22 m) long	NE	0		357		
untitled (to Margrit Suter, with pleasure, affectionately)	1974	Green fluorescent light	4 ft (122 cm) wide	NE	0		358		
untitled (to Stephen with gratitude aplenty)	1974-1989	Cool white fluorescent light	5 ft (152 cm) wide	NE	0		359		
untitled (to Ellen Johnson, fondly)	1975	Red, pink, and yellow fluorescent light	4 ft (122 cm) wide	5	3	Allen Memorial Art Museum, Oberlin, Ohio	360		
untitled	1975	Daylight and warm white fluorescent light	9 ft (274 cm) high, 3 ft (91 cm) wide	3	0		361		
untitled	1975	Daylight and warm white fluorescent light	9 ft (274 cm) high, 3 ft (91 cm) wide	3	0		362		
untitled (to Ellen aware, my surprise)	1975	Pink, blue, and green fluorescent light	8 ft (244 cm) square across a corner	5	2	Des Moines Art Center, Des Moines, Iowa	363		
untitled (to you, Anne Livet)	1975	Red, pink, and yellow fluorescent light	8 ft (244 cm) square across a corner	3	0		364		
untitled	1975	Ultraviolet fluorescent light	40 ft (12.2 m) high	NE	0		365		
untitled	1975	Daylight and cool fluorescent light	4 ft (122 cm) high	5	2		366		
untitled	1975	Green fluorescent light	16 ft (488 cm) long diagonal	5	2		367		
untitled (to Robert, Joe and Michael)	1975-1981	Pink and yellow fluorescent light	8 ft (244 cm) wide, in a corridor measuring 8 ft (244 cm) high and 8 ft (244 cm) wide; Length variable	3	2	Dia Art Foundation, Beacon, New York; and Museum of Contemporary Art, Los Angeles	368		
untitled (to Robert, Joe and Michael) 2	1975-1982	Red and yellow fluorescent light	8 ft (244 cm) wide, in a corridor measuring 8 ft (244 cm) high and 8 ft (244 cm) wide; Length variable	3	0		369		
untitled	1976	Red and ultraviolet fluorescent light	Five sections, 4 ft (122 cm) high, 1 ft (30.5 cm) wide each	NE	0		370		
untitled (affectionately, to two Americans, Florence and Howard Merritt)	1976	Red, white, and blue fluorescent light	Unknown	NE	0		371		
untitled	1976	Red and daylight fluorescent light	4 ft (122 cm) wide	5	0		372		
untitled	1976	Red and cool white fluorescent light	4 ft (122 cm) wide	5	0		373		
untitled	1976	Red and warm fluorescent light	4 ft (122 cm) wide	5	0		374		
untitled	1976	Red and soft white fluorescent light	4 ft (122 cm) wide	5	0		375		
untitled	1976	Pink and red fluorescent light	8 ft (244 cm) high	5	3		376		
untitled	1976	Pink and yellow fluorescent light	8 ft (244 cm) high	5	2		377		
untitled	1976	Pink and blue fluorescent light	8 ft (244 cm) high	5	3		378		
untitled	1976	Pink and green fluorescent light	8 ft (244 cm) high	5	2		379		
untitled	1976	Pink, blue, and green fluorescent light	8 ft (244 cm) high, leaning	5	4		380		
untitled	1976	Pink, green, and blue fluorescent light	8 ft (244 cm) high, leaning	5	3	Dia Art Foundation, Beacon, New York	381		
untitled (fondly, to Helen)	1976	Blue, yellow, and green fluorescent light	8 ft (244 cm) high, leaning	5	4		382		
untitled (fondly, to Helen)	1976	Blue, green, and yellow fluorescent light	8 ft (244 cm) high, leaning	5	2		383		
untitled (fondly, to "Phip")	1976	Pink, red, and green fluorescent light	8 ft (244 cm) high	5	0		384		
untitled (fondly, to "Phip")	1976	Pink, yellow, and blue fluorescent light	8 ft (244 cm) high	5	0		385		
untitled	1976	Red, yellow, and green fluorescent light	8 ft (244 cm) high, 2 ft (61 cm) wide across a corner	5	1		386		
untitled	1976	Red, yellow, and blue fluorescent light	8 ft (244 cm) high, 2 ft (61 cm) wide across a corner	5	0		387		
untitled	1976	Pink, red, and blue fluorescent light	8 ft (244 cm) wide	5	0		388		
untitled	1976	Daylight and red fluorescent light	4 ft (122 cm) wide across a corner	5	0		389		
a color corridor modified by blue (affectionately, to Wendy and Lindsay)	1976	Pink, yellow, green, and blue fluorescent light	8 ft (244 cm) high	NE	0		390		
untitled (to Fiona, fondly) 1	1976	Blue, green, and red fluorescent light	6 ft (183 cm) high	5	0		391		
untitled (to Fiona, fondly) 2	1976	Red, green, and blue fluorescent light	6 ft (183 cm) high	5	0		392		
untitled (to Fiona, fondly) 3	1976	Pink, green, and yellow fluorescent light	6 ft (183 cm) high	5	0		393		
untitled (to Fiona, fondly) 4	1976	Yellow, green, and pink fluorescent light	6 ft (183 cm) high	5	0		394		
untitled (for Mary Ann and Hal with fondest regards) 1	1976	Pink and green fluorescent light	8 ft (244 cm) square across a corner	3	0		395		
untitled (for Mary Ann and Hal with fondest regards) 2	1976	Green and pink fluorescent light	8 ft (244 cm) square across a corner	3	0		396		
untitled	1976	Pink and yellow fluorescent light	8 ft (244 cm) square across a corner	3	3		397		
untitled (to Emmy and Joe with affection)	1976	Green, pink, and blue fluorescent light	First section: 24 ft (7.3 m) wide; Second section: 56 ft (17.1 m) wide	NE	1		398	Commissioned by Joseph Pulitzer Jr. and Emily Rauh Pulitzer for their country home in St. Louis County.	
Varese corridor	1976	Green, pink, and yellow fluorescent light	Two sections, 92 ft (28 cm) long	NE	1	Villa Panza, Varese, Italy (permanent loan to Fondo Ambiente Italiano, collection of Solomon R. Guggenheim Museum, New York)	399		
untitled	1976-1977	Pink, daylight, and yellow fluorescent light	Three sections, approx. 1000 ft (300 m) long each	NE	1		400		
untitled (in memory of Josef Albers) 1	1977	Pink, blue, and green fluorescent light	8 ft (244 cm) wide	5	0		401		
untitled (in memory of Josef Albers) 2	1977	Green, blue, and pink fluorescent light	8 ft (244 cm) wide	5	0		402		
untitled (in memory of "Sandy" Calder) V	1977	Red, yellow, and blue fluorescent light	10 ft (305 cm) wide	5	1		403		
untitled (for you Leo, in long respect and affection) 1	1977	Pink, green, yellow, and blue fluorescent light	8 ft (244 cm) square across a corner	3	1	Louis Vuitton Foundation, Paris	404		
untitled (for you Leo, in long respect and affection) 2	1977	Blue, yellow, pink, and green fluorescent light	8 ft (244 cm) square across a corner	3	2		405		
untitled (for Robert, with fond regards) 1	1977	Pink, yellow, and red fluorescent light	4 ft (122 cm) square across a corner	5	2		406		
untitled (for Robert, with fond regards) 2	1977	Pink, yellow, and red fluorescent light	8 ft (244 cm) square across a corner	3	2	National Gallery of Australia, Canberra; and Whitney Museum, New York	407		
untitled (in honor of Harold Joachim) 1	1977	Pink, blue, green, and yellow fluorescent light	12 ft (366 cm) high, 4 ft (122 cm) wide across a corner	3	0		408		
untitled (in honor of Harold Joachim) 2	1977	Pink, yellow, blue, and green fluorescent light	4 ft (122 cm) square across a corner	5	3		409		
untitled (in honor of Harold Joachim) 3	1977	Pink, yellow, blue, and green fluorescent light	8 ft (244 cm) square across a corner	3	1	Dia Art Foundation, Beacon, New York	410		
untitled (fondly, to Gus, Ruth and Ken)	1977	Green, blue, yellow, and pink fluorescent light	Eight sections 8 ft (244 cm) high each	NE	0		411		
untitled	1977	Blue, red, pink, and yellow fluorescent light	Two sections, 112 ft (34 m) long each	NE	0		412		
untitled (quietly, to the memory of Mia Visser)	1977	Blue and ultraviolet fluorescent light	First section: 8 ft (244 cm) wide; Second section: 72 ft (22 m) wide	NE	1		413		
untitled (to Helene)	1977	Pink, yellow, blue, and green fluorescent	Four sections, 8 ft (244 cm) high each	NE	0		414		
untitled (for Gretchen, a colorful and fond match)	1977	Green fluorescent light	4 ft (122 cm) high	NE	0		415		
untitled	1978	Blue, red, and pink fluorescent light	2 ft (61 cm) high, 4 ft (122 cm) wide across a corner	5	0		416		
untitled (to the real Dan Hill) 1a	1978	Pink, yellow, green, and blue fluorescent light	8 ft (244 cm) high, leaning	5	4	Musée d'art contemporain de Lyon	417		
untitled (to the real Dan Hill) 1b	1978	Blue, green, yellow, and pink fluorescent light	8 ft (244 cm) high, leaning	5	3	Dia Art Foundation, Beacon, New York; Museum of Contemporary Art, Antwerp; and Nelson-Atkins Museum of Art, Kansas City, Missouri	418		
untitled	1978	Daylight and warm white fluorescent light	14 ft (427 cm) high, 2 ft (61 cm) wide	5	0		419		
untitled (for you Leo, in long respect and affection) 3	1978	Pink, green, yellow, and blue fluorescent light	4 ft (122 cm) square across a corner	5	3	Museum of Contemporary Art Chicago	420		
untitled (for you Leo, in long respect and affection) 4	1978	Pink, green, blue and yellow fluorescent light	4 ft (122 cm) square across a corner	5	3	Modern Art Museum of Fort Worth, Fort Worth, Texas	421		
untitled (to Helene) 2	1978-1979	Pink, yellow, blue, and green fluorescent light	Four sections, 8 ft (244 cm) high	3	1		422		
untitled (to John Holmes)	1979	Blue and red fluorescent light	Two sections, 24 ft (732 cm) long diagonal	NE	0		423		
untitled (to Cathie Conn)	1979	Cool white and warm white fluorescent light	Two sections, 10 ft (305 cm) high each	NE	0		424		
untitled (for Betty and Richard Koshalek, a friendly reminder)	1979	Green, yellow, blue, and pink fluorescent light	First section: approx. 40 × 60 ft (12.2 × 18.3 m); Second section: approx. 12 × 25 ft (366 × 760 cm)	NE	1		425		
untitled (for Carol and Mike, mostly nightly)	1979	Ultraviolet fluorescent light	4 ft (122 cm) high, 8 ft (244 cm) wide	NE	1		426		
untitled (to Piet Mondrian)	1979	Red, yellow, and blue fluorescent light	8 ft (244 cm) wide	NE	1		427		
untitled (to Stephen)	1979-1980	Pink and green fluorescent light	First section: 48 ft (14.65 m) wide; Second section: 60 ft (18.3 m) long diagonal	NE	1	James Martin Fitzgerald United States Courthouse, Anchorage, Alaska (collection of General Services Administration)	428		
untitled	1979	Pink, yellow, green, and blue fluorescent light	Eight sections: Two sections 2 ft (61 cm) high; Two sections 4 ft (122 cm) high; Two sections 6 ft (183 cm) high; Two sections 8 ft (244 cm) high	NE	1		429		
untitled	1979	Pink and yellow fluorescent light	18 ft (548 cm) wide	NE	1		430		
untitled	1979	Cool white and daylight fluorescent light	Four sections, 2 ft (61 cm) high and 2 ft (61 cm) wide each	NE	1		431		
untitled	1979	Cool white and daylight fluorescent light	Six section, 16 in (40 cm) wide each	NE	1		432		

=== 1980s ===
List of works by Dan Flavin - 1980s
Title	Year	Medium	Dimensions	Edition size	No. of works fabricated	Public collection(s)	2004 CR no.	Notes	Ref
untitled	1980	Pink, blue, and green fluorescent light	2 ft (61 cm) wide across a corner, height dependent on room size	3	0		433		
"monument for V. Tatlin	1981	Red and daylight fluorescent light	8 ft (244 cm) high or wide	5	2		434		
"monument for V. Tatlin	1981	Yellow, daylight, and red fluorescent light	8 ft (244 cm) wide	5	2	Dia Art Foundation, Beacon, New York	435		
untitled (to Julie Brown)	1981	Green, blue, yellow, red, and pink fluorescent light	8 ft (244 cm) high, in a wedge-shaped corridor; Back wall: 38 ft (11.6 m) long; Front angled wall: two sections, 23 ft 2 in (705 cm) long; Widest point between front and back walls: 13 ft 1 in (400 cm)	3	1		436		
untitled (to my dear bitch, Airily)	1981	Blue fluorescent light	8 ft (244 cm) long diagonal, in a corridor measuring 8 ft (244 cm) high and 8 ft (244 cm) wide	NE	0		437		
untitled (to Thordis)	1981	Pink fluorescent light	8 ft (244 cm) long diagonal	NE	1		438		
"monument" for V. Tatlin	1982	Red, yellow, and daylight fluorescent light	8 ft (244 cm) long diagonal	5	0		439		
untitled (for Leila and Massimo, with admiration and affection)	1982	Blue and red fluorescent light	8 ft (244 cm) high, in a corridor measuring 8 ft (244 cm) high and 8 ft (244 cm) wide	NE	0		440		
untitled (to my dear bitch, Airily) 1A	1982	Pink and green fluorescent light	8 ft (244 cm) long diagonal, in a corridor measuring 8 ft (244 cm) high and 8 ft (244 cm) wide	NE	0		441		
Untitled	1982	Yellow, green, and cool white fluorescent light	Three sections: First section, two parts, 24 ft (732 cm) long diagonal each; Second section, two parts, 10 ft (305 cm) high; Third section, eight parts, each 16 in (40 cm) diameter	NE	0		442	Commissioned by the Dia Art Foundation, along with CR nos. 443–445, for 155 Mercer Street, a building originally intended to be a dance rehearsal space but reconfigured to serve as the Masjid al-Farah mosque; Work was dismantled in 1987.	
Untitled	1982	Cool white and warm white fluorescent light	Four sections, each 6 ft (183 cm) long diagonal	NE	0		443	Commissioned by the Dia Art Foundation, along with CR nos. 442, 444, and 445, for 155 Mercer Street; dismantled in 1987.	
Untitled	1982	Green, warm white, and cool white fluorescent light	Three sections: First section, four parts, 12 ft (366 cm) long diagonal each; Second section, two parts, 6 ft (183 cm) long diagonal; Third section, eight parts, each 16 in (40 cm) diameter	NE	0		444	Commissioned by the Dia Art Foundation, along with CR nos. 442, 443, and 445, for 155 Mercer Street; dismantled in 1987.	
Untitled	1982	Red and blue fluorescent light	Two sections, 4 ft (122 cm) wide each	NE	0		445	Commissioned by the Dia Art Foundation, along with CR nos. 442–444, for 155 Mercer Street; dismantled in 1987.	
untitled (to my dear bitch, Airily) 2	1984	Blue and green fluorescent light	86 ft 8 in (26.4 m) wide or 68 ft (20.7 m) wide in two sections	NE	0		446		
untitled (to Ellen)	1984	Blue, pink, and green fluorescent light	8 ft (244 cm) wide across a corner	5	1		447		
Ksenija's Frieze	1985	Pink, yellow, blue and green fluorescent light	32 ft (976 cm) wide	3	0		448		
untitled (to Ksenija)	1985	Green, blue, yellow, and pink fluorescent light	8 ft (244 cm) high	5	3		449		
untitled (to Ksenija)	1985	Green, blue, yellow, and pink fluorescent light	8 ft (244 cm) high	5	3		450		
untitled (to Ksenija)	1985	Green, blue, yellow, and pink fluorescent light	8 ft (244 cm) high	5	3		451		
untitled (to Ksenija)	1985	Green, blue, yellow, and pink fluorescent light	8 ft (244 cm) high	5	4		452		
untitled (to Ksenija)	1985	Blue, yellow, pink, and green fluorescent light	8 ft (244 cm) high	5	1		453		
untitled (to Piet Mondrian)	1985	Red, yellow, and blue fluorescent light	8 ft (244 cm) high	5	2		454		
untitled (in awe and appreciation of you, Nikki)	1985	Pink, yellow, green, red, and blue fluorescent light	8 ft (244 cm) high, over 16 ft (488 cm) wide	NE	0		455		
untitled (fondly to Margo)	1986	Warm white, cool white, and daylight fluorescent light	8 ft (244 cm) high, 2 ft (61 cm) wide across a corner	5	3		456		
untitled (fondly to Margo)	1986	Yellow and pink fluorescent light	8 ft (244 cm) high, 8 ft (244 cm) wide across a corner	3	1		457		
untitled (fondly to Margo)	1986	Yellow and pink fluorescent light	8 ft (244 cm) wide	3	1		458		
untitled (fondly to Margo)	1986	Pink and yellow fluorescent light	8 ft (244 cm) high or 8 ft (244 cm) wide	5	3	National Museum of Art, Osaka	459		
untitled (fondly to Margo)	1986	Pink and yellow fluorescent light	8 ft (244 cm) high	5	1		460		
untitled (fondly to Margo)	1986	Yellow and pink fluorescent light	16 ft (488 cm) high	3	2		461		
untitled (fondly to Margo)	1986	Yellow and pink fluorescent light	16 ft (488 cm) high	3	1		462		
untitled (to John Chamberlain)	1986	Pink, blue, green, and yellow fluorescent light	4 ft (122 cm) high, 2 ft (61 cm) wide, 2 ft (61 cm) deep	NE	0		463		
untitled (to Piet Mondrian through his preferred colors, red, yellow and blue)	1986	Red, yellow, blue, and daylight fluorescent light	101 modular units, 2 ft (61 cm) high, 16 in (40 cm) wide each	NE	1	Stedelijk Museum Amsterdam	464		
untitled (to Piet Mondrian who lacked green) 2	1986	Pink and green fluorescent light	Dimensions unknown	NE	0		465		
untitled (to the citizens of Lyon)	1987	Blue and red fluorescent light	Eight sections; Four sections 12 ft (366 cm) high; Four sections 4 ft (122 cm) wide	NE	1	Musée d'art contemporain de Lyon	466		
untitled (to Isabelle "la belle lyonnaise")	1987	Green, blue, yellow, and pink fluorescent light	Eleven sections; Ten sections 8 ft (244 cm) wide each; One section 16 ft (488 cm) wide	NE	1	Musée d'art contemporain de Lyon	467		
untitled (in honor of Leo at the 30th anniversary of his gallery)	1987	Red, pink, yellow, blue, and green fluorescent light	8 ft (244 cm) square across a corner	5	2	San Francisco Museum of Modern Art	468		
untitled (in honor of Leo at the 30th anniversary of his gallery)	1987	Red, pink, yellow, blue, and green fluorescent light	4 ft (122 cm) square across a corner	5	4		469		
untitled (for Fredericka and Ian)	1987	Pink and red fluorescent light	6 ft (183 cm) long diagonal	5	2		470		
untitled (for Fredericka and Ian) 2	1987	Pink, red, and yellow fluorescent light	6 ft (183 cm) long diagonal	5	1		471		
untitled (for Fredericka and Ian) 3	1987	Pink, yellow, and blue fluorescent light	6 ft (183 cm) long diagonal	5	2		472		
untitled (for Fredericka and Ian) 4	1987	Pink, blue, and green fluorescent light	6 ft (183 cm) long diagonal	5	3		473		
untitled (to Caroline)	1987	Daylight, cool white, and warm white fluorescent light	8 ft (244 cm) high	5	4	Fonds national d'art contemporain, Centre national des arts plastiques, Paris	474		
untitled (to Anne)	1987	Daylight, cool white, and warm white fluorescent light	8 ft (244 cm) high	5	2		475		
untitled (to Eugenia)	1987	Cool white, warm white, and daylight fluorescent light	8 ft (244 cm) high	5	3		476		
untitled (to the citizens of the Swiss cantons) 1	1987	Red and daylight fluorescent light	4 ft (122 cm) long diagonal	5	1	Buffalo AKG Art Museum, Buffalo, New York	477		
untitled (to the citizens of the Swiss cantons) 2	1987	Red and cool white fluorescent light	4 ft (122 cm) long diagonal	5	2	Buffalo AKG Art Museum, Buffalo, New York	478		
untitled (to the citizens of the Swiss cantons) 3	1987	Red and warm white fluorescent light	4 ft (122 cm) long diagonal	5	3	Buffalo AKG Art Museum, Buffalo, New York	479		
untitled (to the citizens of the Swiss cantons) 4	1987	Red and soft white fluorescent light	4 ft (122 cm) long diagonal	5	2	Buffalo AKG Art Museum, Buffalo, New York	480		
untitled (for Annemarie and Gianfranco) 1	1987	Pink, yellow, and green fluorescent light	8 ft (244 cm) high	5	3		481		
untitled (for Annemarie and Gianfranco) 2	1987	Pink, yellow, and blue fluorescent light	8 ft (244 cm) high	5	2		482		
untitled (to Don Judd, colorist) 1	1987	Pink fluorescent light	4 ft (122 cm) high, 4 ft (122 cm) wide	5	3	Scottish National Gallery of Modern Art, Edinburgh, and Tate, London (jointly owned via Artist Rooms)	483	Nos. 1 and 6 from this series are colored and configured the same and share a CR no.	
untitled (to Don Judd, colorist) 6	1987	Pink fluorescent light	4 ft (122 cm) high, 4 ft (122 cm) wide	5	3		483	Nos. 1 and 6 from this series are colored and configured the same and share a CR no.	
untitled (to Don Judd, colorist) 2	1987	Pink and red fluorescent light	4 ft (122 cm) high, 4 ft (122 cm) wide	5	3	Scottish National Gallery of Modern Art, Edinburgh, and Tate, London (jointly owned via Artist Rooms)	484		
untitled (to Don Judd, colorist) 3	1987	Pink and yellow fluorescent light	4 ft (122 cm) high, 4 ft (122 cm) wide	5	3	Scottish National Gallery of Modern Art, Edinburgh, and Tate, London (jointly owned via Artist Rooms)	485		
untitled (to Don Judd, colorist) 4	1987	Pink and blue fluorescent light	4 ft (122 cm) high, 4 ft (122 cm) wide	5	3	Scottish National Gallery of Modern Art, Edinburgh, and Tate, London (jointly owned via Artist Rooms)	486		
untitled (to Don Judd, colorist) 5	1987	Pink and green fluorescent light	4 ft (122 cm) high, 4 ft (122 cm) wide	5	3	Scottish National Gallery of Modern Art, Edinburgh, and Tate, London (jointly owned via Artist Rooms)	487		
untitled (to Don Judd, colorist) 7	1987	Red and pink fluorescent light	4 ft (122 cm) high, 4 ft (122 cm) wide	NE	0		488		
untitled (to Don Judd, colorist) 8	1987	Yellow and pink fluorescent light	4 ft (122 cm) high, 4 ft (122 cm) wide	NE	0		489		
untitled (to Don Judd, colorist) 9	1987	Blue and pink fluorescent light	4 ft (122 cm) high, 4 ft (122 cm) wide	NE	0		490		
untitled (to Don Judd, colorist) 10	1987	Green and pink fluorescent light	4 ft (122 cm) high, 4 ft (122 cm) wide	NE	0		491		
untitled (to Rainer) 2	1987	Cool white and warm white fluorescent light	7 1/2 ft (228 cm) high	5	3		492		
untitled (to Rainer) 3	1987	Cool white and soft white fluorescent light	7 1/2 ft (228 cm) high	5	4		493		
untitled (to Rainer) 4	1987	Cool white and daylight fluorescent light	7 1/2 ft (228 cm) high	5	3		494		
untitled (to Alex and Nikki)	1987	Blue, green, red, pink, and yellow fluorescent light	12 ft (366 cm) high	5	3	Louis Vuitton Foundation, Paris	495		
untitled (to Charlotte)	1987	Red, pink, yellow, blue and green fluorescent light	8 ft (244 cm) high	5	4		496		
untitled (to Véronique)	1987	Red, yellow, blue, and green, fluorescent light	8 ft (244 cm) high	5	4		497		
untitled (to V. Mayakovsky) 1	1987	Red fluorescent light	4 ft (122 cm) long diagonal	5	3		498		
untitled (to V. Mayakovsky) 2	1987	Red fluorescent light	4 ft (122 cm) long diagonal	5	3		499		
untitled (in loving memory of 'Toiny from Leo and Dan)	1987	Pink, yellow, and blue fluorescent light	Dimensions variable	NE	1		500		
untitled (to John Vinci)	1987	Pink, yellow, blue, and green fluorescent light	12 ft 2 in (371 cm) high	NE	0		501		
untitled (to S.A., lovingly)	1987	Blue and red fluorescent light	8 ft (244 cm) square across a corner	3	2		502		
untitled (to S.A., lovingly)	1987	Blue and red fluorescent light	4 ft (244 cm) square across a corner	5	3		503		
untitled	1987	Pink and yellow fluorescent light	4 ft (244 cm) square across a corner	5	3		504		
untitled (for Donald Young)	1987	Pink, blue, yellow, and green fluorescent light	8 ft (244 cm) wide	5	2		505		
untitled (for Ellen)	1988	Pink, blue, and green fluorescent light	4 ft (122 cm) square across a corner	5	3		506		
untitled (to the people of Baden-Baden, respectfully)	1989	Red and yellow fluorescent light	Five sections, 16 ft (488 cm) high each	NE	1	Staatliche Kunsthalle Baden-Baden, Baden-Baden, Germany	507		
untitled (for the staff of the Staatliche Kunsthalle Baden-Baden and their fellow craftsfolk who thought about and worked on this exposition of mine, with gratitude and esteem)	1989	Ultraviolet fluorescent light	4 ft (122 cm) long on each of three alternating diagonals	NE	1	Staatliche Kunsthalle Baden-Baden, Baden-Baden, Germany	508		
untitled	1989	Pink, green, and blue fluorescent light	Six sections: Four sections 12 ft (366 cm) high; Two sections 12 ft (366 cm) wide	NE	0		509		
untitled (to the Poetters, affectionately)	1989	Green, pink, yellow, and blue fluorescent light	Dimensions unknown	NE	0		510		
untitled	1989	Pink, yellow, and green fluorescent light	4 ft (122 cm) square across a corner	5	2		511		
untitled (for Leo Castelli at his gallery's 30th anniversary) 3	1989	Red, pink, yellow, blue, and green fluorescent light	4 ft (122 cm) square across a corner	5	1		512		
untitled (to Sabine)	1989	Warm white and cool white fluorecsent light	Eight sections, 16 in (40 cm) diameter each	NE	0		513		
untitled (to Nikki)	1989	Warm white and daylight fluorescent light	Eight sections, 16 in (40 cm) diameter each	NE	0		514		
untitled	1989	Ultraviolet fluorescent light	At least 40 ft (12.2 m) wide	NE	0		515		
untitled	1989	Daylight, blue, and red fluorescent light	4 ft (122 cm) high, 2 ft (61 cm) deep, 124 units wide	3	1		516		
untitled (to the citizens of the Republic of France on the 200th anniversary of their revolution) 1	1989	Blue, cool white, and red fluorescent light	6 ft (183 cm) wide, height variable	3	0		517		
untitled (to the citizens of the Republic of France on the 200th anniversary of their revolution) 2	1989	Blue, cool white, and red fluorescent light	4 ft (122 cm) wide, 2 ft (61 cm) deep, height variable	3	0		518		
untitled (to the citizens of the Republic of France on the 200th anniversary of their revolution) 3	1989	Blue, cool white, and red fluorescent light	2 ft (61 cm) wide, 2 ft (61 cm) deep, height variable	3	0		519		
untitled (to the people of the French Revolution)	1989	Red, blue, and cool white fluorescent light	4 ft (122 cm) wide, 2 ft (61 cm) deep	5	1		520		
untitled (to Morgan and Laurie) 1	1989	Blue and red fluorescent light	8 ft (244 cm) high, 2 ft (61 cm) deep	5	2		521		
untitled (to Morgan and Laurie) 2	1989	Blue and red fluorescent light	8 ft (244 cm) high, 2 ft (61 cm) deep	5	3		522		
untitled (to Annemarie and Gianfranco) 3	1989	Pink, yellow, and green fluorescent light	8 ft (244 cm) high	5	3		523		
untitled (to Annemarie and Gianfranco) 4	1989	Pink, yellow, and green fluorescent light	8 ft (244 cm) high	5	3		524		
untitled (to Annemarie and Gianfranco) 5	1989	Pink, yellow, and green fluorescent light	8 ft (244 cm) high	5	3		525		
untitled (to Sabine) summer	1989	Pink, yellow, blue, and green fluorescent light	Dimensions unknown	NE	0		526		
untitled (to Sabine) winter	1989	Pink, yellow, blue, and green fluorescent light	Dimensions unknown	NE	0		527		

=== 1990s ===
List of works by Dan Flavin - 1990s
Title	Year	Medium	Dimensions	Edition size	No. of works fabricated	Public collection(s)	2004 CR no.	Notes	Ref
"monument" for V. Tatlin	1990	Cool white fluorescent light	8 ft (244 cm) high	5	1	Leeum, Samsung Museum of Art, Seoul	528		
untitled (to Lucie Rie, master potter) 1b	1990	Cool white and daylight fluorescent light	6 ft (183 cm) high, 2 ft (61 cm) deep	5	0		529		
untitled t(o Lucie Rie, master potter) 1c	1990	Cool white and blue fluorescent light	6 ft (183 cm) high, 2 ft (61 cm) deep	5	3		530		
untitled (to Lucie Rie, master potter) 1d	1990	Cool white fluorescent light	6 ft (183 cm) high, 2 ft (61 cm) deep	5	3		531		
untitled (to Lucie Rie, master potter) 1j	1990	Yellow, blue, green, and red fluorescent light	6 ft (183 cm) high, 2 ft (61 cm) deep	5	3		532		
untitled (to Lucie Rie, master potter) 1k	1990	Yellow, blue, red, and green fluorescent light	6 ft (183 cm) high, 2 ft (61 cm) deep	5	0		533		
untitled (to Lucie Rie, master potter) 1l	1990	Pink, blue, and green fluorescent light	6 ft (183 cm) high, 2 ft (61 cm) deep	5	0		534		
untitled (to Lucie Rie, master potter) 1o	1990	Blue, yellow, red, and green fluorescent light	6 ft (183 cm) high, 2 ft (61 cm) deep	5	3		535		
untitled (to Lucie Rie, master potter) 1u	1990	Pink, yellow, blue, and green fluorescent light	6 ft (183 cm) high, 2 ft (61 cm) deep	5	3		536		
untitled (to Lucie Rie, master potter) 1y	1990	Yellow, green, pink, and blue fluorescent light	6 ft (183 cm) high, 2 ft (61 cm) deep	5	0		537		
untitled (to Lucie Rie, master potter) 1aa	1990	Yellow fluorescent light	6 ft (183 cm) high, 2 ft (61 cm) deep	5	3		358		
untitled (to Lucie Rie, master potter) 1ii	1990	Green, pink, and yellow fluorescent light	6 ft (183 cm) high, 2 ft (61 cm) deep	5	0		539		
untitled (to Lucie Rie, master potter) 1nn	1990	Pink, yellow, red, and green fluorescent light	6 ft (183 cm) high, 2 ft (61 cm) deep	5	0		540		
untitled (to Lucie Rie, master potter) 1pp	1990	Red, pink, yellow, and green fluorescent light	6 ft (183 cm) high, 2 ft (61 cm) deep	5	0		541		
untitled (to Lucie Rie, master potter) 1ddd	1990	Pink, yellow, red, and green fluorescent light	6 ft (183 cm) high, 2 ft (61 cm) deep	5	3		542		
untitled (to Lucie Rie, master potter) 1fff	1990	Pink, yellow, blue, and green fluorescent light	6 ft (183 cm) high, 2 ft (61 cm) deep	5	0		543		
untitled (to Lucie Rie, master potter) 1iii	1990	Pink, green, yellow, and red fluorescent light	6 ft (183 cm) high, 2 ft (61 cm) deep	5	0		544		
untitled (to Lucie Rie, master potter) 1jjj	1990	Pink, blue, yellow, and green fluorescent light	6 ft (183 cm) high, 2 ft (61 cm) deep	5	3		545		
untitled (to Lucie Rie, master potter) 1ppp	1990	Blue, green, pink, and yellow fluorescent light	6 ft (183 cm) high, 2 ft (61 cm) deep	5	0		546		
untitled (to Lucie Rie, master potter) 1rrr	1990	Blue, green, yellow, and pink fluorescent light	6 ft (183 cm) high, 2 ft (61 cm) deep	5	0		547		
untitled (for Conor Cruise O'Brien) 4a	1990	Pink, green, and yellow fluorescent light	8 ft (244 cm) long diagonal, 2 ft (61 cm) deep	5	1		548		
untitled (for Conor Cruise O'Brien) 4b	1990	Green, yellow, and pink fluorescent light	8 ft (244 cm) long diagonal, 2 ft (61 cm) deep	5	0		549		
untitled (for Conor Cruise O'Brien) 5a	1990	Pink, green, yellow, and red fluorescent light	8 ft (244 cm) long diagonal, 2 ft (61 cm) deep	5	1		550		
untitled (for Conor Cruise O'Brien) 5b	1990	Green, red, pink, and yellow fluorescent light	8 ft (244 cm) long diagonal, 2 ft (61 cm) deep	5	1		551		
untitled (for Conor Cruise O'Brien) 5c	1990	Red, green, yellow, and blue fluorescent light	8 ft (244 cm) long diagonal, 2 ft (61 cm) deep	5	1		552		
untitled (for Conor Cruise O'Brien) 6a	1990	Green, yellow, pink, and red fluorescent light	8 ft (244 cm) long diagonal, 2 ft (61 cm) deep	5	1		553		
untitled (for Conor Cruise O'Brien) 6b	1990	Green, yellow, blue and pink fluorescent light	8 ft (244 cm) long diagonal, 2 ft (61 cm) deep	5	1		554		
untitled (for Conor Cruise O'Brien) 4aa	1990	Pink, green, and yellow fluorescent light	4 ft (122 cm) long diagonal, 2 ft (61 cm) deep	5	1		555		
untitled (for Conor Cruise O'Brien) 4bb	1990	Green, yellow, and pink fluorescent light	4 ft (122 cm) long diagonal, 2 ft (61 cm) deep	5	0		556		
untitled (for Conor Cruise O'Brien) 5aa	1990	Pink, green, yellow, and red fluorescent light	4 ft (122 cm) long diagonal, 2 ft (61 cm) deep	5	0		557		
untitled (for Conor Cruise O'Brien) 5bb	1990	Green, red, pink, and yellow fluorescent light	4 ft (122 cm) long diagonal, 2 ft (61 cm) deep	5	0		558		
untitled (for Conor Cruise O'Brien) 5cc	1990	Red, green, yellow, and blue fluorescent light	4 ft (122 cm) long diagonal, 2 ft (61 cm) deep	5	1		559		
untitled (for Conor Cruise O'Brien) 6aa	1990	Green, yellow, pink, and red fluorescent light	4 ft (122 cm) long diagonal, 2 ft (61 cm) deep	5	0		560		
untitled (for Eric Zetterquist) 1	1990	Yellow, blue, pink, and green fluorescent light	4 ft (122 cm) long diagonal, 2 ft (61 cm) deep	5	2		561		
untitled (for Paul Gredinger, with respect and admiration)	1990	Cool white, warm white, and daylight fluorescent light	4 ft (122 cm) long diagonal, 2 ft (61 cm) deep	5	3		562		
untitled (for Ad Reinhardt) 1b	1990	Blue, yellow, pink, red, and green fluorescent light	8 ft (244 cm) high, 2 ft (61 cm) deep	5	1		563		
untitled (for Ad Reinhardt) 1c	1990	Pink, yellow, green, red, and blue fluorescent light	8 ft (244 cm) high, 2 ft (61 cm) deep	5	0		564		
untitled (for Ad Reinhardt) 1d	1990	Yellow, pink, red, blue, and fluorescent light	8 ft (244 cm) high, 2 ft (61 cm) deep	5	1		565		
untitled (for Ad Reinhardt) 1e	1990	Green, yellow, pink, red, and blue fluorescent light	8 ft (244 cm) high, 2 ft (61 cm) deep	5	0		566		
untitled (for Ad Reinhardt) 2a	1990	Ultraviolet fluorescent light	4 ft (122 cm) wide	5	0		567		
untitled (for Ad Reinhardt) 2b	1990	Pink and ultraviolet fluorescent light	4 ft (122 cm) wide	5	1		568		
untitled (for Ad Reinhardt) 2d	1990	Blue and ultraviolet fluorescent light	4 ft (122 cm) wide	5	1		569		
untitled (for Ad Reinhardt) 2e	1990	Pink, ultraviolet, and red fluorescent light	4 ft (122 cm) wide	5	1		570		
untitled (for Ad Reinhardt) 2h	1990	Pink, yellow, blue, and green fluorescent light	4 ft (122 cm) wide	5	1		571		
untitled (for Ad Reinhardt) 2i	1990	Pink, green, and blue fluorescent light	4 ft (122 cm) wide	5	1		572		
untitled (for Otto Freundlich) 3a	1990	Blue, pink, red, yellow, and green fluorescent light	4 ft (122 cm) high, 2 ft (61 cm) deep	5	1		573		
untitled (for Otto Freundlich) 3ab	1990	Blue, pink, yellow, and red fluorescent light	4 ft (122 cm) high, 2 ft (61 cm) deep	5	1		574		
untitled (for Otto Freundlich) 3g	1990	Pink, yellow, and red fluorescent light	4 ft (122 cm) high, 2 ft (61 cm) deep	5	1		575		
untitled (for Otto Freundlich) 3j	1990	Green, pink, yellow, and red fluorescent light	4 ft (122 cm) high, 2 ft (61 cm) deep	5	0		576		
untitled (for Otto Freundlich) 3p	1990	Red, blue, pink, and yellow fluorescent light	4 ft (122 cm) high, 2 ft (61 cm) deep	5	1		577		
untitled (for Otto Freundlich) 3r	1990	Blue and red fluorescent light	4 ft (122 cm) high, 2 ft (61 cm) deep	5	1		578		
untitled (for John Heartfield) 3a	1990	Red fluorescent light	8 ft (244 cm) high, 2 ft (61 cm) deep	5	1		579		
untitled (for John Heartfield) 3b	1990	Red and blue fluorescent light	8 ft (244 cm) high, 2 ft (61 cm) deep	5	0		580		
untitled (for John Heartfield) 3c	1990	Red and blue fluorescent light	8 ft (244 cm) high, 2 ft (61 cm) deep	5	0		581		
untitled (for John Heartfield) 3d	1990	Red and blue fluorescent light	8 ft (244 cm) high, 2 ft (61 cm) deep	5	0		582		
untitled (for John Heartfield) 4a	1990	Red, pink, yellow, and green fluorescent light	8 ft (244 cm) high, 2 ft (61 cm) deep	5	0		583		
untitled (for John Heartfield) 4b	1990	Red, pink, yellow, and blue fluorescent light	8 ft (244 cm) high, 2 ft (61 cm) deep	5	0		584		
untitled (for John Heartfield) 5a	1990	Red, pink, yellow, and green fluorescent light	8 ft (244 cm) high, 2 ft (61 cm) deep	5	0		585		
untitled (to S.L.) a	1990	Pink and yellow fluorescent light	8 ft (244 cm) wide, 2 ft (61 cm) deep	5	0		586		
untitled (to S.L.) b	1990	Green, pink, and yellow fluorescent light	8 ft (244 cm) wide, 2 ft (61 cm) deep	5	0		587		
untitled (to S.L.) c	1990	Yellow and pink fluorescent light	8 ft (244 cm) wide, 2 ft (61 cm) deep	5	0		588		
untitled (to S.L.) e	1990	Red, pink, and yellow fluorescent light	8 ft (244 cm) wide, 2 ft (61 cm) deep	5	0		589		
untitled (to Hans Coper, master potter) 15	1990	Cool white fluorescent light	8 ft (244 cm) high, 2 ft (61 cm) deep	5	0		590		
untitled (to Hans Coper, master potter) 17a	1990	Cool white fluorescent light	8 ft (244 cm) high, 2 ft (61 cm) deep	5	1		591		
untitled (to Hans Coper, master potter) 17b	1990	Cool white and daylight fluorescent light	8 ft (244 cm) high, 2 ft (61 cm) deep	5	1		592		
untitled (to Hans Coper, master potter) 17c	1990	Cool white and warm white fluorescent light	8 ft (244 cm) high, 2 ft (61 cm) deep	5	1		593		
untitled (to Hans Coper, master potter) 17d	1990	Cool white, daylight, and warm white fluorescent light	8 ft (244 cm) high, 2 ft (61 cm) deep	5	2		594		
untitled (to Hans Coper, master potter) 21a	1990	Cool white, daylight, and warm white fluorescent light	4 ft (122 cm) high, 2 ft (61 cm) deep	5	0		595		
untitled (to Hans Coper, master potter) 21b	1990	Cool white, daylight, and warm white fluorescent light	4 ft (122 cm) high, 2 ft (61 cm) deep	5	1		596		
untitled (to Hans Coper, master potter) 24a	1990	Daylight and cool white fluorescent light	4 ft (122 cm) high, 4 ft (122 cm) wide	5	3	Museo Nacional Centro de Arte Reina Sofía, Madrid; and Museum Brandhorst, Munich	597		
untitled (to Hans Coper, master potter) 24b	1990	Warm white and cool white fluorescent light	4 ft (122 cm) high, 4 ft (122 cm) wide	5	2	Museo Nacional Centro de Arte Reina Sofía, Madrid	598		
untitled (to Hans Coper, master potter) 25a	1990	Daylight and cool white fluorescent light	8 ft (244 cm) high, 2 ft (61 cm) wide	5	3	Museo Nacional Centro de Arte Reina Sofía, Madrid	599		
untitled (to Hans Coper, master potter) 25b	1990	Warm white and cool white fluorescent light	8 ft (244 cm) high, 2 ft (61 cm) wide	5	2	Museo Nacional Centro de Arte Reina Sofía, Madrid	600		
untitled (to my friend DeWain Valentine) a	1990	Pink and yellow fluorescent light	6 ft (183 cm) long diagonal, 2 ft (61 cm) deep	5	0		601		
untitled (to my friend DeWain Valentine) b	1990	Pink, yellow, and green fluorescent light	6 ft (183 cm) long diagonal, 2 ft (61 cm) deep	5	0		602		
untitled (to my friend DeWain Valentine) c	1990	Pink, yellow, and blue fluorescent light	6 ft (183 cm) long diagonal, 2 ft (61 cm) deep	5	0		603		
untitled (to my friend DeWain Valentine) d	1990	Pink, yellow, and red fluorescent light	6 ft (183 cm) long diagonal, 2 ft (61 cm) deep	5	0		604		
untitled (to my friend DeWain Valentine) e	1990	Pink, blue, yellow, and green fluorescent light	6 ft (183 cm) long diagonal, 2 ft (61 cm) deep	5	2	Mumok, Vienna	605		
untitled (to my friend DeWain Valentine) f	1990	Pink, blue, and yellow fluorescent light	6 ft (183 cm) long diagonal, 2 ft (61 cm) deep	5	0		606		
untitled (to my friend DeWain Valentine) g	1990	Pink, blue, yellow, and red fluorescent light	6 ft (183 cm) long diagonal, 2 ft (61 cm) deep	5	1	Mumok, Vienna	607		
untitled (to my friend DeWain Valentine) h	1990	Pink, green, and blue fluorescent light	6 ft (183 cm) long diagonal, 2 ft (61 cm) deep	5	0		608		
untitled (to my friend DeWain Valentine) i	1990	Pink, green, and yellow fluorescent light	6 ft (183 cm) long diagonal, 2 ft (61 cm) deep	5	0		609		
untitled (to my friend DeWain Valentine) 1a	1990	Yellow, red, and pink fluorescent light	8 ft (244 cm) long diagonal, 2 ft (61 cm) deep	5	0		610		
untitled (to my friend DeWain Valentine) 1b	1990	Blue, red, and pink fluorescent light	8 ft (244 cm) long diagonal, 2 ft (61 cm) deep	5	0		611		
untitled (to my friend DeWain Valentine) 1c	1990	Green, red, and pink fluorescent light	8 ft (244 cm) long diagonal, 2 ft (61 cm) deep	5	0		612		
untitled (to my friend DeWain Valentine) 1d	1990	Pink fluorescent light	8 ft (244 cm) long diagonal, 2 ft (61 cm) deep	5	0		613		
untitled (to my friend DeWain Valentine) 1e	1990	Yellow and pink fluorescent light	8 ft (244 cm) long diagonal, 2 ft (61 cm) deep	5	0		614		
untitled (to my friend DeWain Valentine) 1f	1990	Blue and pink fluorescent light	8 ft (244 cm) long diagonal, 2 ft (61 cm) deep	5	0		615		
untitled (to my friend DeWain Valentine) 1g	1990	Green and pink fluorescent light	8 ft (244 cm) long diagonal, 2 ft (61 cm) deep	5	0		616		
untitled (to my friend DeWain Valentine) 2a	1990	Red and pink fluorescent light	6 ft (183 cm) diagonal, 2 ft (61 cm) deep	5	0		617		
untitled (to my friend DeWain Valentine) 2b	1990	Red, pink, and yellow fluorescent light	6 ft (183 cm) diagonal, 2 ft (61 cm) deep	5	0		618		
untitled (to my friend DeWain Valentine) 2c	1990	Red, pink, and blue fluorescent light	6 ft (183 cm) diagonal, 2 ft (61 cm) deep	5	0		619		
untitled (to my friend DeWain Valentine) 2d	1990	Red, pink, and green fluorescent light	6 ft (183 cm) diagonal, 2 ft (61 cm) deep	5	0		620		
untitled (for Denise)	1990	Yellow, green, and pink fluorescent light	4 ft (122 cm) wide or high, 2 ft (61 cm) deep	5	1		621		
untitled (to Burgoyne Diller)	1990	Red, blue, and yellow fluorescent light	8 ft (244 cm) high, 2 ft (61 cm) deep	NE	0		622		
untitled	1990	Pink, blue, and yellow fluorescent light	8 ft (244 cm) square across a corner	NE	0		623		
untitled (for Lafayette, we remember) 1	1991	Blue, pink, and red fluorescent light	8 ft (244 cm) high, 2 ft (61 cm) deep	5	0		624		
untitled (for Lafayette, we remember) 2	1991	Blue, pink, and red fluorescent light	4 ft (122 cm) high, 2 ft (61 cm) deep	5	0		625		
untitled (to Clare) 1	1991	Pink, red, and yellow fluorescent light	8 ft (244 cm) high, 2 ft (61 cm) deep	5	0		626		
untitled (to Clare) 2	1991	Pink, blue, and yellow fluorescent light	8 ft (244 cm) high, 2 ft (61 cm) deep	5	0		627		
untitled (to Clare) 3	1991	Pink, green, and yellow fluorescent light	8 ft (244 cm) high, 2 ft (61 cm) deep	5	0		628		
untitled	1991	Red and ultraviolet fluorescent light	8 ft (244 cm) wide	NE	0		629		
untitled	1991	Yellow and ultraviolet fluorescent light	8 ft (244 cm) wide	NE	0		630		
untitled	1991	Green and ultraviolet fluorescent light	8 ft (244 cm) wide	NE	0		631		
untitled (for A. C.)	1992	Pink, yellow, blue, and green fluorescent light	8 ft (244 cm) square across a corner	3	2	Denver Art Museum	632		
untitled (for C.D.)	1992	Pink, green, and yellow fluorescent light	8 ft (244 cm) high	3	0		633		
untitled (for P.P.F) 2	1992	Red, ultraviolet, pink, and yellow fluorescent light	8 ft (244 cm) high, 8 ft (244 cm) wide	3	0		634		
untitled (for S.D.)	1992	Ultraviolet and yellow fluorescent light	8 ft (244 cm) high, 2 ft (61 cm) wide across a corner	5	5		635		
untitled (for Prudence and her new baby) a	1992	Ultraviolet and red fluorescent light	8 ft (244 cm) high, 2 ft (61 cm) wide across a corner	5	5		636		
untitled (for Prudence and her new baby) b	1992	Ultraviolet and pink fluorescent light	8 ft (244 cm) high, 2 ft (61 cm) wide across a corner	5	3		637		
untitled (for Prudence and her new baby) c	1992	Ultraviolet and blue fluorescent light	8 ft (244 cm) high, 2 ft (61 cm) wide across a corner	5	1		638		
untitled (to Ken Price)	1992	Pink, red, green, yellow, and blue fluorescent light	4 ft (122 cm) high, 2 ft (61 cm) deep	5	2		639		
untitled (to Tracy, to celebrate the love of a lifetime)	1992	Pink, green, blue, yellow, daylight, red, and ultraviolet fluorescent light	Dimensions variable	NE	1	Solomon R. Guggenheim Museum, New York	640		
untitled (to Tracy Harris)	1992	Red, yellow, green, ultraviolet, blue, and daylight fluorescent light	Four sections: First section 136 ft (41.45 m) wide; Second section 136 ft (41.45 m) wide; Third section, three parts, 32 ft (976 cm) wide each; Fourth section, six parts, 4 ft (122 cm) wide each	NE	1		641		
untitled (to Madeline and Eric Kraft)	1992	Red, ultraviolet, pink, and yellow fluorescent light	4 ft (122 cm) wide, 2 ft (61 cm) deep	5	3		642		
untitled (to Mary Elizabeth)	1992	Daylight and warm white fluorescent light	4 ft (122 cm) wide, 2 ft (61 cm) deep	5	3		643		
untitled (for Professor Klaus Gallwitz)	1993	Red, blue, pink, yellow, green, and ultraviolet fluorescent light	Six sections: Two sections 12 ft (366 cm) high; Four sections 16 ft (488 cm) high	NE	1	Städel, Frankfurt	644		
untitled (to Alexandra as you recover)	1993	Pink, blue, yellow, and green fluorescent light	8 ft (244 cm) high	5	0		645		
untitled (for the Vernas on the opening anew)	1993	Red, pink, and yellow fluorescent light	2 ft (61 cm) wide, 2 ft (61 cm) deep on an angle	5	1		646		
untitled (for the Vernas on the opening anew)	1993	Green, pink, and yellow fluorescent light	4 ft (122 cm) wide, 2 ft (61 cm) deep on an angle	5	0		647		
untitled (for the Vernas on the opening anew)	1993	Blue, pink, and yellow fluorescent light	4 ft (122 cm) wide, 2 ft (61 cm) deep on an angle	5	0		648		
untitled (to Greta Garbo)	1993	Green and yellow fluorescent light	8 ft (244 cm) high, 2 ft (61 cm) wide across a corner	5	1		649		
untitled (to Ariadne)	1993	Pink, yellow, blue, and green fluorescent light	8 ft (244 cm) high, 2 ft (61 cm) wide across a corner	5	1		650		
untitled (for Buck)	1993	Pink, blue, and green fluorescent light	16 ft (488 cm) high, 2 ft (61 cm) wide across a corner	5	1		651		
untitled	1993	Yellow, blue, and red fluorescent light	4 ft (122 cm) high, 6 ft (183 cm) wide	5	1		652		
untitled	1993	Red, yellow, and blue fluorescent light	2 ft (61 cm) wide	5	1		653		
untitled (to Ksenija)	1994	Pink, yellow, blue, and green fluorescent light	Four rows of 4-foot (122 cm) fixtures running full length of space, approx. 328 ft (100 m) long	NE	1		654		
untitled	1994	Yellow fluorescent light	Ten units, 4 ft (122 cm) high each	NE	1	Städtische Galerie im Lenbachhaus, Munich	655		
untitled (to Ronald S. Lauder)	1994	Blue, red, and daylight fluorescent light	4 ft (122 cm) high	5	1		656		
untitled	1994	Red, yellow, and blue fluorescent light	Modular units, 4 ft (122 cm) long diagonal each	NE	0		657		
untitled (to Jörg Schellmann)	1994	Warm white and daylight fluorescent light	8 ft (244 cm) high, 2 ft (61 cm) wide across a corner	5	3		658		
untitled (to Jörg Schellmann)	1994	Blue and pink fluorescent light	8 ft (244 cm) high, 2 ft (61 cm) wide across a corner	5	3		659		
untitled (to Barnett Newman for “Who’s Afraid of Virginia Woolf”)	1994	Red, blue, and yellow fluorescent light	24 ft (732 cm) high, 2 ft (61 cm) wide across a corner	3	1	Baltimore Museum of Art	660		
untitled	1995	Blue, red, and green fluorescent light	4 ft (122 cm) wide	5	3		661		
untitled	1995	Green and red fluorescent light	4 ft (122 cm) wide	5	0		662		
untitled	1995	Pink, red, and green fluorescent light	4 ft (122 cm) wide	5	3	Metropolitan Museum of Art, New York	663		
untitled	1995	Yellow, red, and green fluorescent light	4 ft (122 cm) wide	5	3		664		
untitled	1995	Red and green fluorescent light	4 ft (122 cm) wide	5	0		665		
untitled	1995	Ultraviolet, red, and green fluorescent light	4 ft (122 cm) wide	5	3	Museum of Fine Arts, Houston	666		
untitled	1995	Blue, green, and red fluorescent light	4 ft (122 cm) wide	5	3		667		
untitled	1995	Green and red fluorescent light	4 ft (122 cm) wide	5	1		668		
untitled	1995	Pink, green, and red fluorescent light	4 ft (122 cm) wide	5	3		669		
untitled	1995	Yellow, green, and red fluorescent light	4 ft (122 cm) wide	5	3		670		
untitled	1995	Red and green fluorescent light	4 ft (122 cm) wide	5	3		671		
untitled	1995	Ultraviolet, green, and red fluorescent light	4 ft (122 cm) wide	5	3		672		
untitled	1995	Blue, green, and red fluorescent light	4 ft (122 cm) wide	5	0		673		
untitled	1995	Yellow, green, and red fluorescent light	4 ft (122 cm) wide	5	0		674		
untitled	1995	Green and red fluorescent light	4 ft (122 cm) wide	5	0		675		
untitled	1995	Red and green fluorescent light	4 ft (122 cm) wide	5	1		676		
untitled	1995	Blue, red, and green fluorescent light	4 ft (122 cm) wide	5	0		677		
untitled	1995	Yellow, red, and green fluorescent light	4 ft (122 cm) wide	5	0		678		
untitled	1995	Green and red fluorescent light	4 ft (122 cm) wide	5	0		679		
untitled (to Janet Chamberlain)	1995	Pink, yellow, blue, and green fluorescent light	4 ft (122 cm) wide	NE	1		680		
untitled	1995	Red, green, and yellow fluorescent light	2 ft (61 cm) high, 8 ft (244 cm) wide	NE	0		681		
untitled	1995	Warm white and daylight fluorecsent light	5 ft (152 cm) high	5	1		682		
untitled	1996	Pink and green fluorescent light	5 ft (152 cm) high	5	4		683		
untitled	1996	Pink and blue fluorescent light	5 ft (152 cm) high	5	1		684		
untitled	1996	Pink and yellow fluorescent light	5 ft (152 cm) high	5	1		685		
untitled (for Robert Ryman)	1996	Warm white and daylight fluorescent light	4 ft (122 cm) high	5	2		686		
untitled	1996	Blue and green fluorescent light	6 ft (183 cm), 8 ft (244 cm), and 12 ft (366 cm) high	NE	1		687		
untitled	1996	Daylight fluorescent light	Three sections: Approx. 13 ft 4 in (405 cm), 12 ft 8 in (385 cm), and 15 ft 4 in(470 cm) high; all 16 in (40 cm) wide	NE	1		688		
untitled	1996	Blue and green fluorescent light	Two sections, approx. 62 ft (19 m) high each	NE	1	Dia Art Foundation, Beacon, New York	689		
untitled	1996	Pink, blue, and green fluorescent light	Three sections: One section 26 ft (11 m) wide; Two sections 8 ft (244 cm) high	NE	1		690		
untitled	1996	Blue and green fluorescent light	Four sections: Three sections 24 ft (732 cm) high, 4 ft (122 cm) wide each; One section 52 ft (15.85 m) wide	NE	1		691		
untitled	1996	Red and daylight fluorescent light	Six sections: Three sections 24 ft (732 cm) high; Two sections 16 ft (488 cm) high; One section 8 ft (244 cm) high	NE	0		692	Installation in the Calvin Klein flagship store on Madison Avenue in New York, originally for the 1996 holiday season; temporarily re-installed by Calvin Klein in 2016.	
untitled	1996	Green, ultraviolet, blue, pink, and yellow fluorescent light	Nave: two sections, 92 ft (28 m) wide each, transept: two sections, 32 ft (975 cm) wide each, apse: two sections, 32 ft (975 cm) high each	NE	1	Santa Maria Annunciata in Chiesa Rossa, Milan	693	Commissioned by Italian priest Giulio Greco and designed just before Flavin's death, this work was executed posthumously with support from the Dia Art Foundation and Fondazione Prada	
untitled	1996	Green fluorescent light	Two sections, 184 (56 m) wide	NE	1	Menil Collection, Houston	694		
untitled	1996	Daylight fluorescent light	Two sections, 16 ft (488 cm) long diagonal each	NE	1	Menil Collection, Houston	695		
untitled	1996	Pink, yellow, green, blue, and ultraviolet fluorescent light	Two sections, 8 ft (244 cm) high each, approx. 128 ft (39 m) wide each	NE	1	Menil Collection, Houston	696		
untitled (Marfa project)	1996	Pink, green, yellow, and blue fluorescent light	Six buildings, two sections each: 8 ft (244 cm) long diagonal in corridors with walls measuring 8 ft (244 cm) diagonal and spaced 5 ft 8 in (1.7 m) apart	NE	1	Chinati Foundation, Marfa, Texas	697		

== Permanent installations ==
From 1975, Flavin installed permanent site-specific works in Europe and the United States. Below are Flavin's works intended to be permanent installations; each work is also included in the above list. De-installed permanent works are listed separately.

=== Extant installations ===
- 101 Spring Street, New York (former residence of artist Donald Judd, collection of the Judd Foundation)
  - untitled (1970); Blue and red fluorescent light; 14 units, each 96 × 96 × 3 1/2 in (243.8 × 243.8 × 8.9 cm)
- Kunstmuseum Basel, Switzerland
  - untitled (in memory of Urs Graf) (1972, installed 1975); Yellow, pink, green, and blue fluorescent light; Eight sections, four sections: 8 ft (244 cm) high, four sections: 44 ft (13.4 m) high
- Kröller-Müller Museum, Otterlo, Netherlands
  - (quietly, to the memory of Mia Visser) (1977); Blue and ultraviolet fluorescent light (tubes, fixtures with acrylic covers); 86 ft 7 in (26.4 m)
- Hudson River Museum, Yonkers, New York
  - untitled (for Betty and Richard Kosahalek, a friendly reminder) (1979); Green, yellow, blue and pink fluorescent light; First section: approx. 40 × 60 ft (12.2 × 18.3 cm), second section: approx. 12 × 25 ft (366 × 760 cm)
- James Martin Fitzgerald United States Courthouse, Anchorage, Alaska (collection of General Services Administration)
  - untitled (to Stephen) (1979–1980); Pink and green fluorescent lights; First section: 48 ft (14.65 m) wide, second section: 60 ft (18.3 m) long diagonal
- Dia Bridgehampton (formerly the Dan Flavin Art Institute), Bridgehampton, New York; 10 works on permanent display since 1983, all collection of Dia Art Foundation, Beacon, New York, except red out of a corner (to Annina) (collection of Dan Flavin Estate); Overall installation referred to by Dia as nine sculptures in fluorescent light (1963–1981);
  - red out of a corner (to Annina) (1963); Red fluorescent light; 8 ft (244 cm) high; Ed. 2/3
  - untitled (to Katharina and Christoph) (1966–1971); Green fluorescent light; 8 ft (244 cm) square across a corner; Ed. 1/5
  - untitled (to Jim Schaeufele) 1 (1972); Cool white fluorescent light; 9 ft (274 cm) high; Ed. 1/3
  - untitled (to Jim Schaeufele) 2 (1972); Daylight fluorescent light; 16 ft (488 cm) high; Ed. 1/3
  - untitled (to Jim Schaeufele) 3 (1972); Warm white fluorescent light; 10 ft (305 cm) high; Ed. 1/3
  - untitled (to Jan and Ron Greenberg) (1972–73); Yellow and green fluorescent light; 8 ft (244 cm) high, in a corridor measuring 8 ft (244 cm) high and 8 ft (244 cm) wide, length variable; Ed. 2/3
  - untitled (1976); Pink, green, and blue fluorescent light; 8 ft (244 cm) high, leaning; Ed. 2/3
  - untitled (in honor of Harold Joachim) 3 (1977); Pink, yellow, blue, and green fluorescent light; 8 ft (244 cm) square across a corner; Ed. 1/3
  - untitled (to Robert, Joe and Michael) (1975–81); Pink and yellow fluorescent light; 8 ft (244 cm) wide, in a corridor measuring 8 ft (244 cm) high and 8 ft (244 cm) wide, length variable; Ed. 2/3
- Staatliche Kunsthalle Baden-Baden, Baden-Baden, Germany
  - untitled (to the people of Baden-Baden, respectfully) (1989); Red and yellow fluorescent light; Five sections, 16 ft (488 cm) height each
- Städtische Galerie im Lenbachhaus, Munich
  - untitled (1994); Yellow fluorescent light; Ten units, 4 ft (122 cm) high each
- Hypo-Haus annex building, Munich (collection of Hypovereinsbank)
  - untitled (to Janet Chamberlain) (1995); Pink, yellow, blue and green fluorescent light; 4 ft (122 cm) wide
- Hamburger Bahnhof, Berlin
  - untitled (1996); Blue and green fluorescent light; 6 ft (183 cm), 8 ft (244 cm), and 12 ft (366 cm) high
- Wissenschaftspark Gelsenkirchen, Gelsenkirchen, Germany
  - untitled (1996); Blue and green fluorescent light; Four sections, sections one–three: 24 ft (732 cm) high each, 4 ft (12 cm) wide each, fourth section: 52 ft (15.85 m) wide
- UBS Office, Bern, Switzerland (collection of UBS)
  - untitled (1996); Pink, blue, and green fluorescent lights; Three sections, first section: 36 ft (11 m) wide, sections two–three: 8 ft (244 cm) high
- Santa Maria Annunciata in Chiesa Rossa, Milan
  - untitled (1996); Green, ultraviolet, blue, pink, and yellow fluorescent light; Nave: two sections, 92 ft (28 m) wide each, transept: two sections, 32 ft (975 cm) wide each, apse: two sections, 32 ft (975 cm) high each
- Menil Collection, Houston
  - untitled (1996); Green fluorescent light; Two sections, 184 ft (56 m) wide each
  - untitled (1996); Daylight fluorescent light; Two sections, 16 ft (488 cm) long diagonal each
  - untitled (1996); Pink, yellow, green, blue, and ultraviolet fluorescent light; Two sections, 8 ft (244 cm) high each, approx. 128 ft (39 m) wide each
- Chinati Foundation, Marfa, Texas
  - untitled (Marfa project) (1996); Pink, green, yellow, and blue fluorescent lights; Six buildings, two sections each: 8 ft (244 cm) long diagonal in corridors with walls measuring 8 ft (244 cm) long diagonal and spaced 5 ft 8 in (1.7 m) apart

=== Formerly installed works ===
- Grand Central Terminal, New York; de-installed 1986
  - untitled (1976–1977); Pink, daylight, and yellow fluorescent light; Three sections, approx. 1000 ft (300 m) long each
- Brooklyn Commons (formerly the MetroTech Center), Brooklyn, New York; de-installed 2018
  - untitled (to Tracy Harris) (1992); Red, yellow, green, ultraviolet, blue, and daylight fluorescent lights; Four sections, first section: 136 ft (41.45 m) wide, second section: 136 ft (41.45 m) wide, third section: three parts, 32 ft (976 cm) wide each, fourth section: six parts, 4 ft (122 cm) wide each
- 548 W 22nd St, Chelsea, Manhattan (collection of Dia Art Foundation)
  - untitled (1996); Blue and green fluorescent light; two sections, each approx. 62 ft (19 m) high

== Citations and references ==
=== Cited references ===
- Bell, Tiffany; Gray, David (2004). "Catalogue of Lights". In Govan, Michael; Bell, Tiffany (eds.). Dan Flavin: The Complete Lights, 1961–1996. New York / New Haven, Connecticut: Dia Art Foundation / Yale University Press. pp. 211–423. ISBN 9780300106336. OCLC 55510648.
- Guidelli-Guidi, Matilde. "Dia Bridgehampton" (PDF). Dia Art Foundation. Archived (PDF) from the original on 14 August 2024.
