= Anthony d'Offay =

British art dealer, collector and curator

Georges Anthony d'Offay (born January 1940) is a British art dealer, collector and curator.

== Life and career ==
Georges Anthony d'Offay was born in January 1940 in Sheffield to a French father.

He began dealing in art in the late 1960s, operating from premises in Dering Street off the top of New Bond Street in London. He closed the gallery in 2001 and founded Artist Rooms in 2008. He has been the recipient of the UK Montblanc de la Culture Arts Patronage Award (2009), The Prince of Wales Medal for Arts Philanthropy (2011) and the Paolozzi Medal (2011). He has been awarded Honorary Doctorates by the University of Edinburgh, De Montfort University, Leicester and Sheffield Hallam University.

=== Anthony d'Offay Gallery (1965–2001) ===
In 1965, at the age of 25, he opened his first gallery in London and for 15 years organised mostly historical exhibitions of early 20th century British art including Abstract Art in England 1913-1915 (1969) which critically reassessed the importance of the Vorticist movement in the UK. In the 1970s, he started to show contemporary art.

In 1980 he opened an exhibition space for contemporary art on the first floor at 23 Dering Street. The gallery was run by d'Offay with Anne Seymour, formerly a curator at Tate, and Marie-Louise Laband who masterminded every aspect of the gallery including the exhibition programme. Together they inaugurated a programme of international contemporary art, starting with an exhibition by Joseph Beuys in August of that year. Beuys' large installation from that show Stripes from the House of the Shaman was sold to the National Gallery of Australia, Canberra.

The gallery also organised and funded events, publications, performances and lectures.

The last exhibition at the Anthony d'Offay Gallery, of Bill Viola, had 70,000 visitors.

=== Artist Rooms ===
d'Offay closed the gallery in 2001 and worked on building a collection of over 1000 artworks. The collection, then valued in excess of £100 million, was donated jointly to the National Galleries of Scotland and Tate in 2008 with the assistance of the National Heritage Memorial Fund, The Art Fund and the Scottish and British Governments.

Since 2009 there have been more than 120 Artist Rooms exhibitions in museums and galleries across the United Kingdom. These free shows have been seen by some 29 million visitors. 55,000 young people are in Artist Rooms education programmes and a 10-fold surge in attendance has been recorded at many venues participating in the programme. 93% of visitors said that the experience of Artist Rooms had changed their ideas about art. The Art Fund charity was one of the original principal supporters of Artist Rooms. It continues to sponsor the Touring Programme of exhibitions from the collection and facilitates dynamic education projects in each venue.

== Allegations of inappropriate behaviour ==
In January 2018, several women with careers in the art world and who have worked with d'Offay, came forward with allegations of sexual harassment and inappropriate behaviour, with police investigating d'Offay after receiving a complaint from a young woman that he sent her malicious messages. The allegations date from 1997 to 2004 with the current police investigation relating to the period from 2012 to 2018. D'Offay strongly denies the allegations and says he is unaware of a police investigation. The Metropolitan Police confirmed that an investigation was ongoing.

The Tate and National Galleries of Scotland, joint recipients of d'Offay's Artist Rooms "part gift, part purchase", publicly announced they would be severing contact with him stating "The work of Tate and NGS is underpinned by values of fairness, equality and respect and the right to work free of sexual harassment. We expect these values to be demonstrated in the behaviour of everyone who is involved in our organisations." On 27 April 2018 he terminated his position as director and a "person with significant control" at the Artist Rooms Foundation, set up to work with the Tate and National Galleries of Scotland on the original Artist Rooms collection. Despite the issued statement and resignation, d'Offay's name was kept in prominent display in Tate Modern's Turbine Hall during this period.

On 8 April 2019 it was confirmed in a joint statement by Tate and NGS to several media outlets that the galleries would be resuming links with d'Offay. It was also revealed, in an article by Ben Quinn in The Guardian that this decision "to quietly resume links with the influential art patron Anthony d'Offay, a year on from allegations against him of sexual harassment, followed intensive lobbying of trustees, it is understood." The police investigation is ongoing, though d'Offay has denied any awareness of an investigation.
