= Artist Rooms =

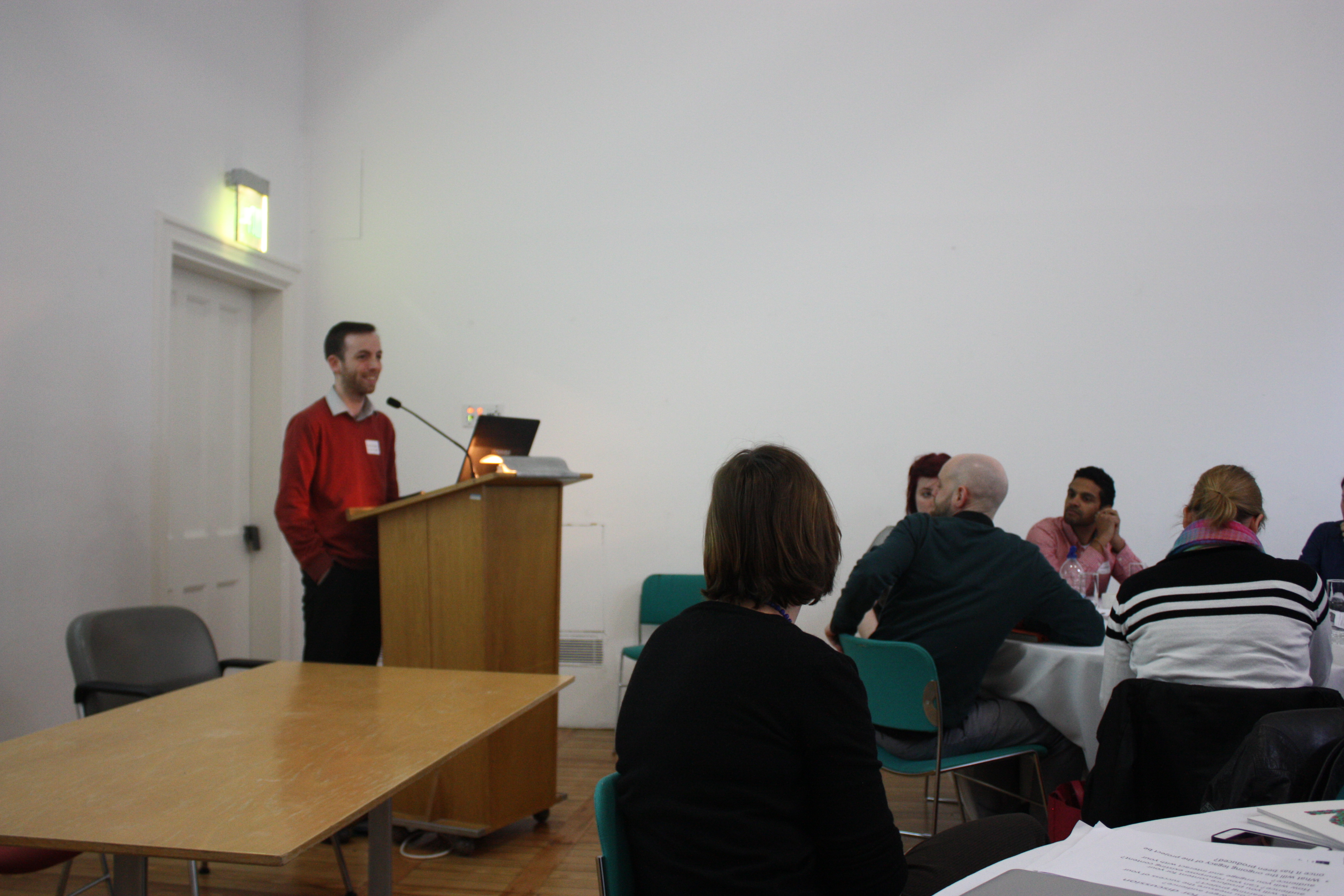
Photos taken at the Developing Digital Resources event at The Studio, at the Scottish National Gallery of Modern Art, on Tuesday 25 March 2014.

Artist Rooms is a touring collection of international modern and contemporary art in the United Kingdom, established through the d'Offay donation in 2008. Comprising over 1,500 works by 42 artists, it is owned by National Galleries Scotland and Tate which care for the collection together and arrange for its presentation throughout the UK in museums, galleries, and exhibition spaces. Each "room" is devoted to a specific artist with the aim of providing an immersive and comprehensive experience of that artist's work, a format described by Nicholas Serota, former director of Tate Modern, as being "without precedent anywhere in the world."

== Establishment ==
In 2001, Anthony d'Offay closed the gallery he had run since 1965 with Anne Seymour and Marie-Louise Laband, and began building a collection of more than 1,000 works from internationally recognized artists, including Joseph Beuys, Andy Warhol, Jeff Koons and Isaac Julien. The collection, then valued at around £125 million, was donated jointly in 2008 to the National Galleries Scotland and Tate, with the assistance of the National Heritage Memorial Fund, the Art Fund and the Scottish and British governments. Tate is also home to a dedicated Rothko Room, where Mark Rothko's Seagram Murals are displayed under subdued lighting as requested by the artist.

== Present-day work ==
At the end of 2024, there had been 211 Artist Rooms across the United Kingdom, with nearly 60 million exhibition visitors. The Art Fund charity was one of the original principal supporters of Artist Rooms. It continues to sponsor the touring program of exhibitions from the collection and facilitates dynamic education projects in each venue.

Artist Rooms exhibitions have been held in Tate Britain, Tate Modern, Scottish National Gallery of Modern Art, Wolverhampton Art Gallery, National Museum Wales, De La Warr Pavilion, mima, Kettle's Yard, Baltic Centre for Contemporary Art, The Hepworth, and Tramway.

=== Education ===
Some 800,000 young people have been involved in the education programs, which are supported by the Artist Rooms Foundation, created in 2011.

== Reception ==
During its fifth anniversary, Maria Miller, secretary of state for culture, media and sport, stated that, "Artist Rooms has been a spectacular success since it was established just five years ago. Thanks to Anthony d’Offay’s generosity, and the hard work and imagination of all those involved in the project, really high quality art has been made available for millions to enjoy up and down the UK. Long may it continue."

Richard Doment wrote that, "it [Artist Rooms] is the most important thing that has happened in the art world in this country in my lifetime."

Similarly, Jonathan Jones described Artist Rooms as, "the best collection of contemporary work," adding that, "what really matters is the strength of the works, and the fact that Britain's museums, large and small, can now draw on such a high-quality treasury."

== Artists in Artist Rooms ==
- Carl Andre
- Diane Arbus
- Phyllida Barlow
- Georg Baselitz
- Joseph Beuys
- Louise Bourgeois
- Vija Celmins
- Martin Creed
- Ian Hamilton Finlay
- Dan Flavin
- Ellen Gallagher
- Gilbert & George
- Douglas Gordon
- Johan Grimonprez
- Richard Hamilton
- Damien Hirst
- Jenny Holzer
- Isaac Julien
- Alex Katz
- Anselm Kiefer
- Jeff Koons
- Jannis Kounellis
- Sol LeWitt
- Roy Lichtenstein
- Richard Long
- Robert Mapplethorpe
- Agnes Martin
- Don McCullin
- Mario Merz
- Daido Moriyama
- Ron Mueck
- Bruce Nauman
- Charles Ray
- Gerhard Richter
- Ed Ruscha
- Robert Ryman
- August Sander
- Robert Therrien
- Cy Twombly
- Bill Viola
- Andy Warhol
- Lawrence Weiner
- Francesca Woodman
