= Men As Trees =

US musical group

- Origin: Auburn Hills, Michigan
- Genres: Screamo, Post-rock
- Instrument(s): Vocals, guitars, drums, keyboard, melodica, violin
- Years active: 2002–2010
- Labels: DIY
- Members: Andrew Kallicragas, Jason Kallicragas, Nick Yonce, Frank Tedeschi
- Past members: Brian Keene, Kyle Babcock, Dave Armitage

Men As Trees was a band from Auburn Hills, Michigan.

== History ==
Formed in 2003 the band sought to combine punk, hardcore and instrumental music into a form that is now often described as a hybrid of screamo and post-rock, and that strives for intensity, both in quick, frantic bursts and longer, patient contemplations. Most notable and referred to as having an epic sound which draws them to the forefront of their blend of genres.

Men As Trees quietly recorded/released a demo and EP online in '05/6 but began to attract notice with their two-song EP, live From the Crow's Nest Looking Out which preceded their first tour in February 2007. 2007 also saw the release of the band's first full-length CD Six Waves In, followed by more touring in the U.S. and Canada and the release, less than a year later, of their most highly refined and best received album to date, Weltschmerz. Men As Trees maintain their DIY roots in many ways, one of which is by offering all of their music for free download .

Summer of 2009 held their month-long European tour where they co-headlined with German post-rock band Single State of Man.

After taking a two-year hiatus to pursue family/travel/school/work, the members of Men As Trees have relocated and reformed as Locktender in Cleveland, OH. Locktender is a concept focused hardcore band concentrating on artists and their works interpreted through music, lyrics & art.

== Discography ==
4Way Split Men As Trees/Le Pre Ou Je Suis Mort/Dolcim/Dying in Motion 12" Vinyl

Men As Trees, Weltschmerz (2008)

- Warred on by Cranes EP (2006)
- From The Crows Nest Looking Out EP (2007)
- Six Waves In Daijoubu Records (2007)
- Weltschmerz Daijoubu Records (2008)
- Men As Trees/Single State of Man Split 7" Vinyl icorrupt records, Synalgie Records, Still Leben Records, LaLa, Emuzah Records (2009)
- 4Way Split Men As Trees/Le Pré Où Je Suis Mort/Dolcim/Dying in Motion 12" Vinyl co-released Ape Must Not Kill Ape / Arctic Radar / Communication Is Not Words / IFB / Moment Of Collapse (2010)
