= Female epic =

The female epic is a concept in literary criticism that seeks to expand generic boundaries by identifying ways in which women authors have adapted the masculine epic tradition to express their own heroic visions.

Historically, epic literature has been considered an exclusively male domain, to the extent that "epic and masculinity appear to be almost coterminous." From Homer's Iliad to Milton's Paradise Lost, the epic canon has been defined by works authored by men, and the characteristic subject matter and diction of the epic have carried connotations of masculinity.

Recently, however, feminist literary critics have identified a number of texts written by women which, they argue, deserve to be considered epics, as they have many of the required qualities: emphasis on heroism, nation building, religious authority, a strong quest motif, and significant length. Because these texts post-date Milton's Paradise Lost – conventionally considered to be the last authentic epic in the Western tradition – they are by default "modern epics". However, argue these critics, this is by no means a contradiction. The epic remains an authentic and vital literary genre, and one to which women have made valuable contributions.

== Poetry Epics by Women ==
- Faltonia Betitia Proba's A Virgilian Cento Concerning the Glory of Christ or Cento was written in fourth century AD. The epic poem uses verses by Virgil in a re-ordered form to recount the life of Jesus.
- Sirat Dhat al-Himma, a classic of Arabic epic poetry. It narrates the tale of Delhemma, a Muslim warrior-woman on the Byzantine frontier. Dhelhemma's story is dominated by the strife between her clan, the Banu Tayy, and their longtime rivals, the Banu Sulaym; and is set within the larger struggles between the Byzantines and Arabs, and the Umayyads and Abbasids. The story itself is medieval in origin, though its exact dating is disputed; it dates back to at least the mid-12th century CE, as it was popular among Muslims during the Crusades, but many scholars believe it was written c.1000 CE, around the time of the Seljuk conquests.
- Mary Tighe's Psyche (1805) uses the Spenserian stanza form originated by Edmund Spenser in his Elizabethan epic The Faerie Queene. In Tighe's epic poem the goddess Venus, out of jealousy for the attentions Psyche receives, commands Cupid to make Psyche fall in love with a monster.
- H.D.'s Helen of Egypt (1961) is an American epic poem that reinvents the myths surrounding Helen, Paris, Achilles, Theseus, and other ancient Greek characters, fusing storylines with the mysteries of Egyptian hermeticism.
- Giannina Braschi's Empire of Dreams (1988) is a postmodern poetry epic about the immigrant's journey from the margins to the center of American culture. Climactic episode takes place at the top of the Empire of State Building, Macy's, and St. Patrick's Cathedral, during a pastoral invasion of modern day New York City.
- Sylvie Kandé, a Franco-Senegalese author, published an epic poem in three cantos that imagines the fate of Mansa Aboubakar II of Mali. One the scenes imagines that a Mali imperial expedition reaches the Americas before Columbus.
- Alice Notley's The Descent of Alette (1996) is a feminist poetry epic which critiques the epic poem itself. It explores a heroine's (Alette) journey through the underworld, re-imagined as an underground subway station, of which she and others are destined to spend eternity at the hands of the Tyrant, a patriarchal figure who controls the world.
