= Little Black Dress (disambiguation) =

A little black dress is an evening or cocktail dress.

Little Black Dress may also refer to:

- Little Black Dress (film), a 2011 South Korean film
- "Little Black Dress", a song from the 1981 film Shock Treatment
- "Little Black Dress", a 1996 song written by Maurice Seezer and performed by Gavin Friday for his album Shag Tobacco
- "Little Black Dress", a 2006 song written by Mark Avsec and performed by Donnie Iris for his album Ellwood City
- "Little Black Dress", a 2013 song written by Sara Bareilles from her album The Blessed Unrest
- "Little Black Dress", a 2013 song by One Direction from their album Midnight Memories

== See also ==
- Black Dress (painting), a 1960 painting by the American artist Alex Katz
- Black Dress (EP), the seventh extended play by girl group CLC
- Black Dresses, a Canadian musical group
- "Gettin' You Home (The Black Dress Song)", a 2009 song performed by Chris Young
- Blackshirts (disambiguation)
