= Eye and Ear Theater =

The Eye and Ear Theater Company was founded in 1979 by Ada Katz, wife of the painter Alex Katz; Roy Leaf, vice president of the Skowhegan School of Painting and Sculpture; and theater director Mac McGinnes, as a non-profit theatrical production company.

== Description ==
Inspired by the poet and artist theaters of the 1950s and early 1960s, such as John B. Myers' Artists' Theatre and the Judson Poets Theatre of Greenwich Village, the organization sought to encourage artistic collaboration through Off Broadway productions of plays written by poets with sets and costumes designed by painters and sculptors. It was run by a Board of Directors which was composed of the company's founders along with Bob Holman, Susan Davis, Beth DeWoody, George Schneeman, and later Joanne Cassulon, Mark Charles, James Kraft, Rosie Levai, Michael O'Brian, and Paul Chupf. The Board dealt with fundraising, production, administration, and publicity. It also set the company's artistic goals, and in pursuing them relied on the assistance of an Advisory Board, which included noted poets, choreographers, and artists like John Ashbery, Edwin Denby, Laura Dean, Paul Taylor, Red Grooms, and Jennifer Bartlett. The members of both bodies were volunteers who contributed resources like office space and secretarial services in addition to their time. Their work would be supported by a paid administrative staff beginning in 1985. The poets and artists were paid for their work and the sets and costumes used in the company's productions remained the property of the theatre company, which on occasion lent them to art exhibitions. Much of the organization's funding came from individuals, corporations, and foundations, as well as state and federal grants, including The National Endowment for the Arts, the Lila Acheson Wallace Fund, the Samuel and May Rudin Foundation, the Kulcher Foundation, the Leonhardt Foundation, and the Foundation for Contemporary Performance Arts.

== Season productions ==
The Eye and Ear Theater Company strove to produce three plays per season, each developed through collaborations between poets, visual artists, and theater directors, usually with the assistance of other specialists. Among the company's productions are works from both contemporary and past poets. The organization's first production, City Junket written by Kenward Elmslie and designed by Red Grooms, opened in 1980 accompanied by a smaller staging of Litany by John Ashbery with sets by Alex Katz. The next season saw the production of Edwin Denby's Four Plays by Edwin Denby, a play originally written for one of Andy Warhol's uncompleted film projects, with sets designed by Elizabeth Murray and costumes by Judith Shea under the direction of Bob Holman. Also produced were The Heroes by John Ashbery with sets by Jane Freilicher and Shopping and Waiting by James Schuyler on a set designed by Alex Katz. In 1982 the company staged Ed Friedman's The White Snake using sets and costumes designed by Robert Kushner followed in 1983 by Paid on Both Sides by W.H. Auden designed by David Hockney. In 1984 Eye and Ear produced the single-act drama Desire Caught by the Tail by Pablo Picasso with sets developed by Linda Benglis. The next year the company produced a play it had commissioned from the poet Alice Notley, Anne's White Glove, on a set designed by Jane Dickson. In 1988 the company produced Kaddish written by Allen Ginsberg and designed by Eric Fischl.

== Archives ==
Archived records for the Eye and Ear Theater exist to 1996.
