= Merlin James =

British artist (born 1960)

Merlin James (born 1960 in Cardiff, Wales) is an artist living and working in Glasgow, Scotland.

== Life and work ==
James studied at Central School of Art and Design, London, and the Royal College of Art, London. His college thesis, on French artist Jean Hélion, led to Hélion introducing him to London's Albemarle Gallery and subsequently to James' first solo exhibition there in 1990. James moved from London to Glasgow in 2004.

Of roughly the same generation as the Young British Artists, James is perhaps unusual in making work on the model of the traditional easel picture. It frequently takes the form of small-scale paintings on stretched canvas or polyester, sometimes incorporating artist-made frames. He also makes drawings and prints.

As a critic, Merlin James has published widely, including many articles and contributions to books and catalogues. In 2002, he became the first to hold the Alex Katz Visiting Chair in Painting at Cooper Union. In 2007 James represented Wales at the 52nd Venice Biennale.

== Notable solo exhibitions ==
- 1995 Poussin's Phocion, National Museum of Wales, Cardiff, Wales
- 1996 Merlin James, Kettle's Yard Gallery, Cambridge, England
- 2001 Merlin James, Andrew Mummery Gallery, London, UK
- 2004 Merlin James: Easel Painting, Talbot Rice Gallery, Edinburgh, Scotland – 40 works covering a 20-year period.
- 2005 Merlin James, Sikkema Jenkins & Co., New York, NY, US
- 2007 Merlin James, Venice Biennale, 52nd International Art Exhibition, Wales Pavilion, Italy (catalogue)
- 2012 Merlin James: In The Gallery, Douglas Hyde Gallery, Trinity College, Dublin, Eire
- 2013 Merlin James, Parasol Unit Foundation for Contemporary Art, London, UK (catalogue)
- 2013 Signal Box, KW Institute for Contemporary Art, Berlin, Germany (catalogue)
- 2014 Freestyle, Kunstverein Freiburg, Freiburg im Breisgau, Germany
- 2014 Merlin James – Paintings, Drawings, Prints, Aanant & Zoo, Berlin, Germany

== Notable group exhibitions ==
- 2004 The Edge of Real, Whitechapel Art Gallery, London, UK
- 2006 Faces of a Collections, Kunsthalle Mannheim, Germany
- 2008/9 21: Selections of Contemporary Art from the Brooklyn Museum, Brooklyn Museum, New York, NY, USA
- 2009 Nus, Fortes Valeca, São Paulo, Brazil
- 2010 Long Long Gone, Leo Koenig, New York, NY, USA
- 2013 Picture Show, Gallery of Modern Art, Glasgow, Scotland
- 2013 Inevitable Figuration, Museo Pecci, Prato, Italy
