= Alex Katz =

American artist (born 1927)

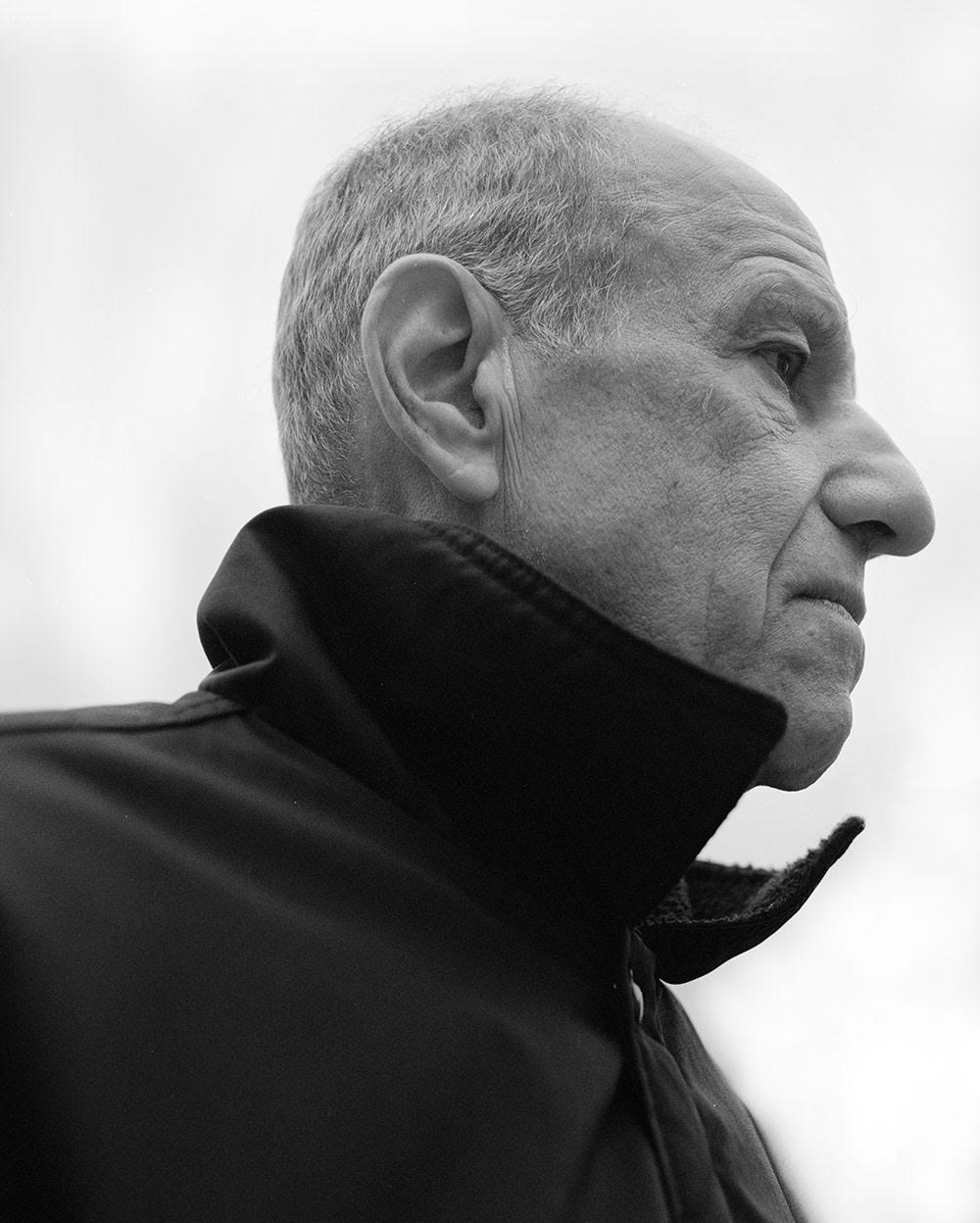
- Katz in 2006
- Born: July 24, 1927 (age 99); Brooklyn, New York, U.S.
- Education: The Cooper Union, Skowhegan School of Painting and Sculpture
- Occupation: Artist
- Known for: Sculpture, painting, printmaking
- Movement: Figurative painting, New Realism, Pop Art
- Spouse: Ada Katz (m. 1958)

Alex Katz (born July 24, 1927) is an American figurative artist known for his paintings, sculptures, and prints. Since 1951, Katz's work has been the subject of more than 200 solo exhibitions and nearly 500 group exhibitions throughout the United States and internationally. He is well known for his large paintings, whose bold simplicity and heightened colors are considered as precursors to Pop Art.

== Early life and career ==
Alex Katz was born on July 24, 1927, to a Jewish family in Brooklyn, New York, the son of an émigré who had lost a factory he owned in Ukraine, Odesa. In 1928, the family moved to St. Albans, Queens, where Katz grew up.

From 1946 to 1949, Katz studied at the Cooper Union in New York, and from 1949 to 1950 at the Skowhegan School of Painting and Sculpture in Maine. Skowhegan exposed him to painting from life, which proved pivotal in his development as a painter and remains a staple of his practices today. Katz has said that Skowhegan's plein air painting gave him "a reason to devote my life to painting". Every year from early June to mid-September, Katz moves from his SoHo loft to a 19th-century clapboard farmhouse in Lincolnville, Maine. A summer resident of Lincolnville since 1954, he has developed a close relationship with Colby College. From 1954 to 1960, he made a number of small collages of still lifes, Maine landscapes, and small figures. He met Ada Del Moro, who had studied biology at New York University, at a gallery opening in 1957. The two married on February 1, 1958. In 1960, Katz had his first (and only) son, Vincent Katz. Vincent Katz had two sons, Isaac and Oliver, who have been the subjects of Katz's paintings.

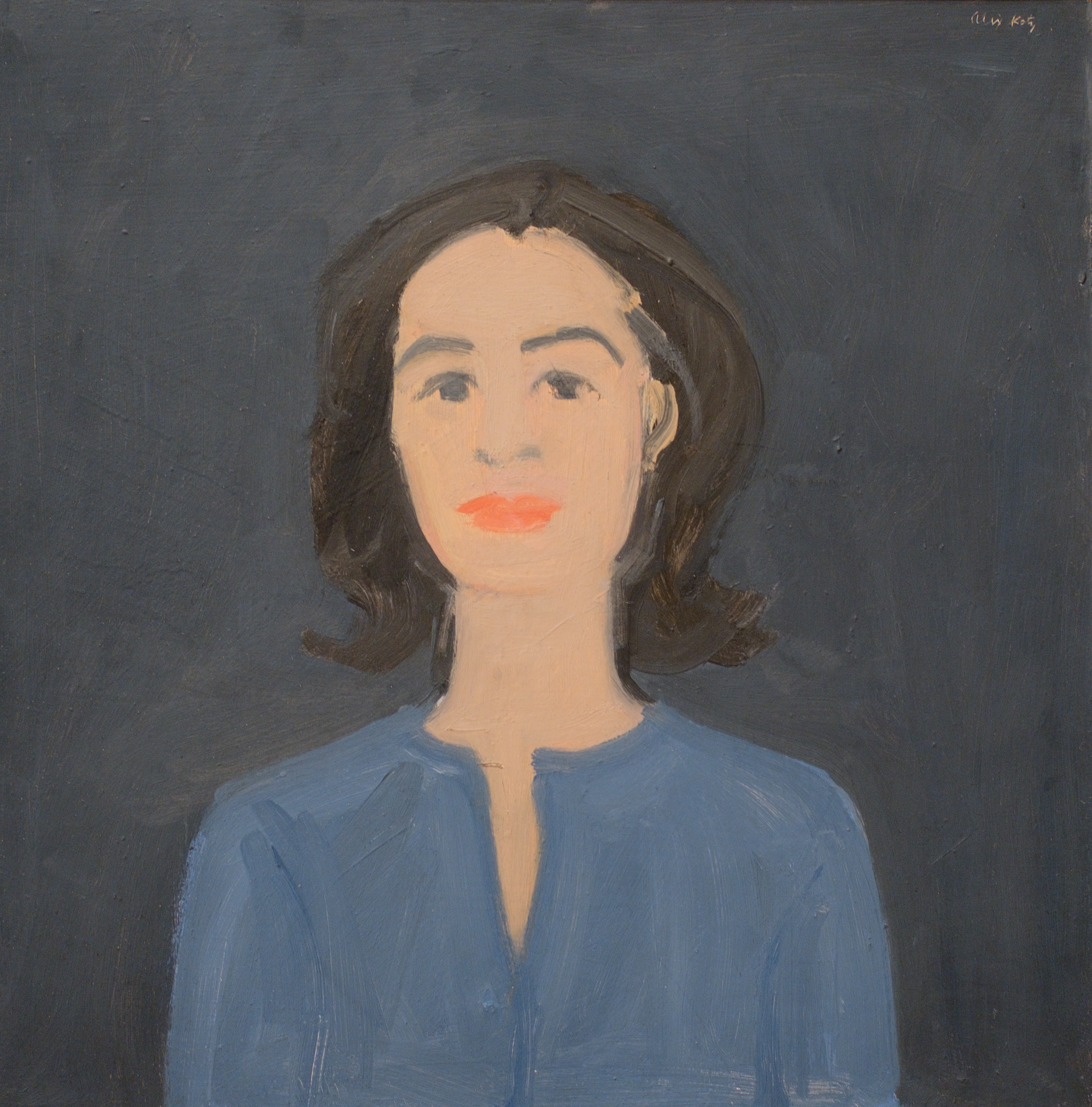
Ada on Blue, 1959. Whitney Museum

Katz has admitted to destroying a thousand paintings during his first ten years as a painter in order to find his style. Since the 1950s, he worked to create art more freely in the sense that he tried to paint "faster than I can think". His works seem simple, but according to Katz they are more reductive, which is fitting to his personality. "One thing I don't want to do is things already done. As for particular subject matter, I don't like narratives, basically."

== Work ==
Katz achieved public prominence in the 1980s. He is well known for his large paintings, whose bold simplicity and heightened colors are now seen as precursors to Pop Art.

=== Artistic style ===
Katz's paintings are divided almost equally into portraiture and landscape. Since the 1960s he has painted views of New York (especially his immediate surroundings in Soho) and landscapes of Maine, where he spends several months every year, as well as portraits of family members, artists, writers and New York socialites. His paintings are defined by their flatness of color and form, their economy of line, and their emotional detachment. A key source of inspiration is Kitagawa Utamaro's woodcuts.

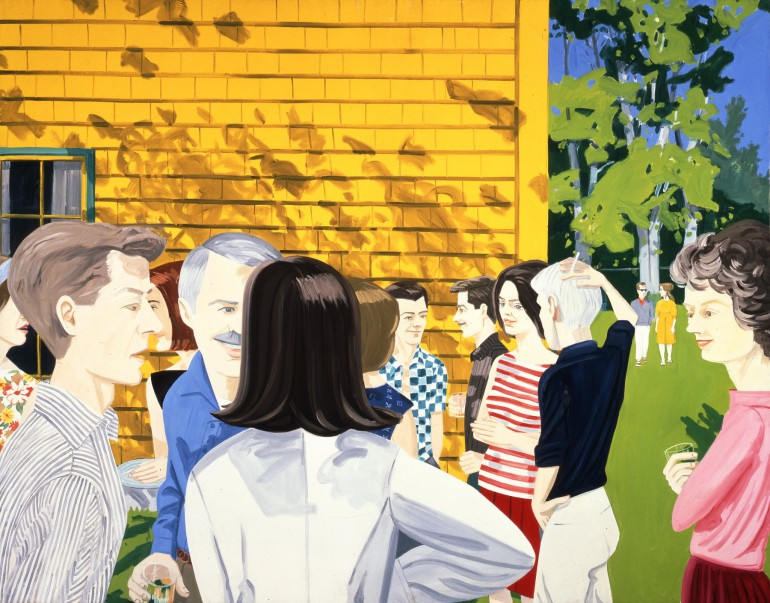
Lawn Party, 1965. Museum of Modern Art

In the early 1960s, influenced by films, television, and billboard advertising, Katz began painting large-scale paintings, often with dramatically cropped faces. Ada Katz, whom he married in 1958, has been the subject of more than 250 of his portraits. To make one of his large works, Katz paints a small oil sketch of a subject on a masonite board; the sitting might take an hour and a half. He then makes a small, detailed drawing in pencil or charcoal, with the subject returning, perhaps, for the artist to make corrections. Katz next blows up the drawing into a "cartoon", sometimes using an overhead projector, and transfers it to an enormous canvas via "pouncing"—a Renaissance-era technique involving powdered pigment pushed through tiny perforations pricked into the cartoon to recreate the composition on the surface to be painted. Katz pre-mixes all his colors and gets his brushes ready. Then he paints the canvas—12 feet (3.7 m) wide by 7 feet (2.1 m) high or even larger—in a session of six or seven hours.

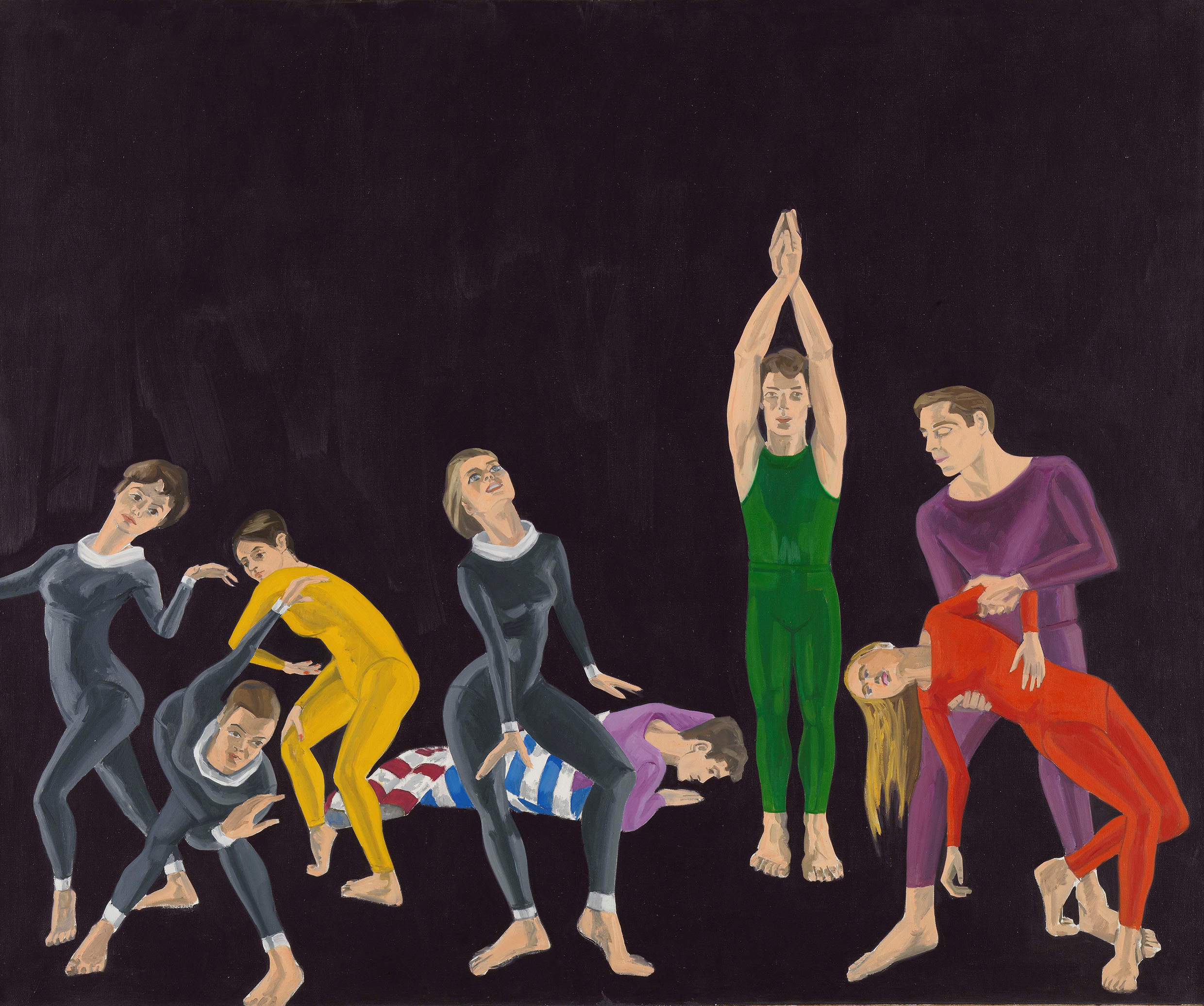
Paul Taylor Dance Company, 1964. Museum Brandhorst

Beginning in the late 1950s, Katz developed a technique of painting on cut panels, first of wood, then aluminum, calling them "cutouts". These works occupied space like sculptures, but their physicality is compressed into planes, as with paintings. The later cutouts are attached to wide, U-shaped aluminum stands, with a flickering, cinematic presence enhanced by warm spotlights. Most are close-ups, showing either front-and-back views of the same figure's head or figures who regard each other from opposite edges of the stand.

After 1964, Katz increasingly portrayed groups of figures. He continued painting these complex groups into the 1970s, portraying the social world of painters, poets, critics, and other colleagues that surrounded him. He began designing sets and costumes for choreographer Paul Taylor in the early 1960s, and he has painted many images of dancers throughout the years. One Flight Up (1968) consists of more than 30 portraits of some of the leading lights of New York's intelligentsia during the late 1960s, such as the poet John Ashbery, the art critic Irving Sandler, and the curator Henry Geldzahler, who championed Andy Warhol. Each portrait is painted using oils on both sides of a sliver of aluminum that has then been cut into the shape of the subject's head and shoulders. The silhouettes are arranged predominantly in four long rows on a plain metal table.

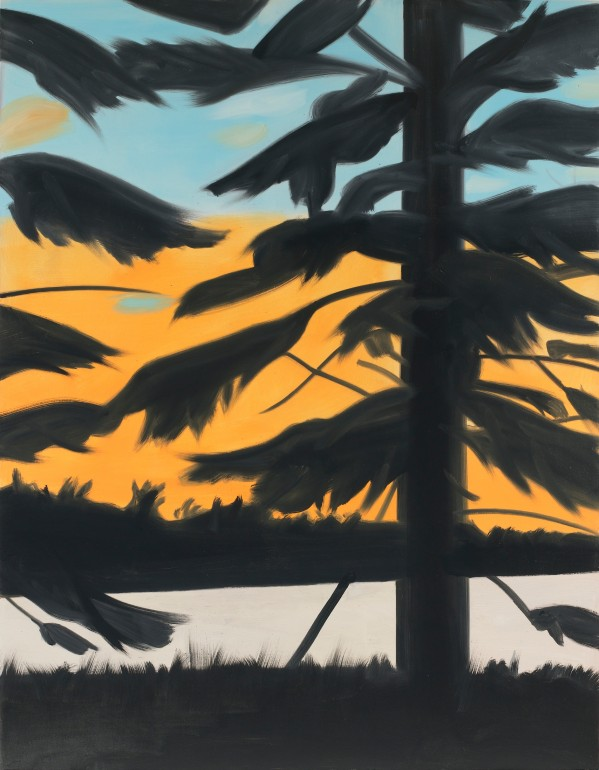
Sunset 1, 2008. Tate Modern

After his Whitney exhibition in 1974, Katz focused on landscapes, saying: "I wanted to make an environmental landscape where you were IN it." In the late 1980s, Katz took on a new subject in his work: fashion models in designer clothing, including Kate Moss and Christy Turlington. "I've always been interested in fashion because it's ephemeral", he said.

=== Printmaking ===
In 1965, Katz also embarked on a prolific career in printmaking. He went on to make many editions in lithography, etching, silkscreen, woodcut and linoleum cut, producing over 400 print editions in his lifetime. The Albertina, Vienna, and the Museum of Fine Arts, Boston, hold complete collections of Katz's print oeuvre. The Albertina released a print catalogue raisonné in 2011.

During his time as a visiting artist at the University of Pennsylvania, Katz approached Japanese artist and printmaker Hitoshi Nakazato, an associate professor at the Graduate School of Fine Art, to make a series of prints.

=== Public commissions ===
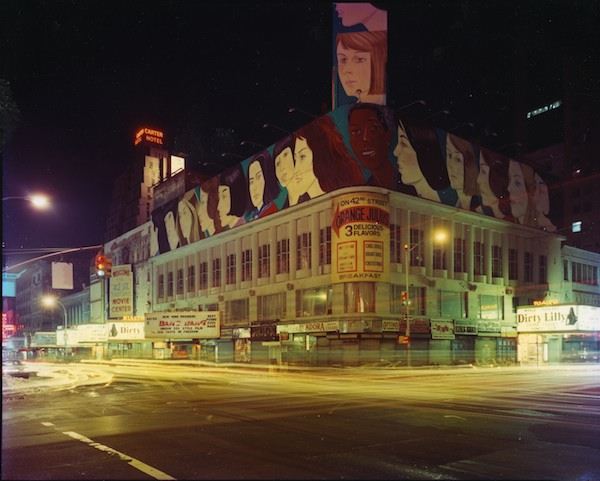
Alex Katz Times Square Mural, 1977

In 1977, Katz was asked to create a work to be produced in billboard format above Times Square, New York City. The work, at 42nd Street and 7th Avenue, consisted of a frieze comprising 23 portrait heads of women. Each portrait was 20 feet (6.1 m) high and based on a study Katz did from life. The billboard extended 247 feet (75 m) along two sides of the RKO General building and wrapped in three tiers above on a 60-foot (18 m) tower. In 1980, the U.S. General Services Administration's Art in Architecture Program commissioned Katz to create an oil-on-canvas mural in the new United States Attorney's Building at Foley Square, New York City. The mural, inside the Silvio V. Mollo Building at Cardinal Hayes Place & Park Row, is 20 feet (6.1 m) high by 20 feet wide. In 2005, Katz participated in a public art project titled "Paint in the City", commissioned by United Technologies Corporation and organized by Creative Time. Katz's work, Give Me Tomorrow, was 28 feet (8.5 m) tall and 53 feet (16 m) long on a billboard space above the Bowery Bar on the corner of the Bowery and East Fourth Street. It was hand-painted by sign painters and installed in 2005.

=== Collaborations ===
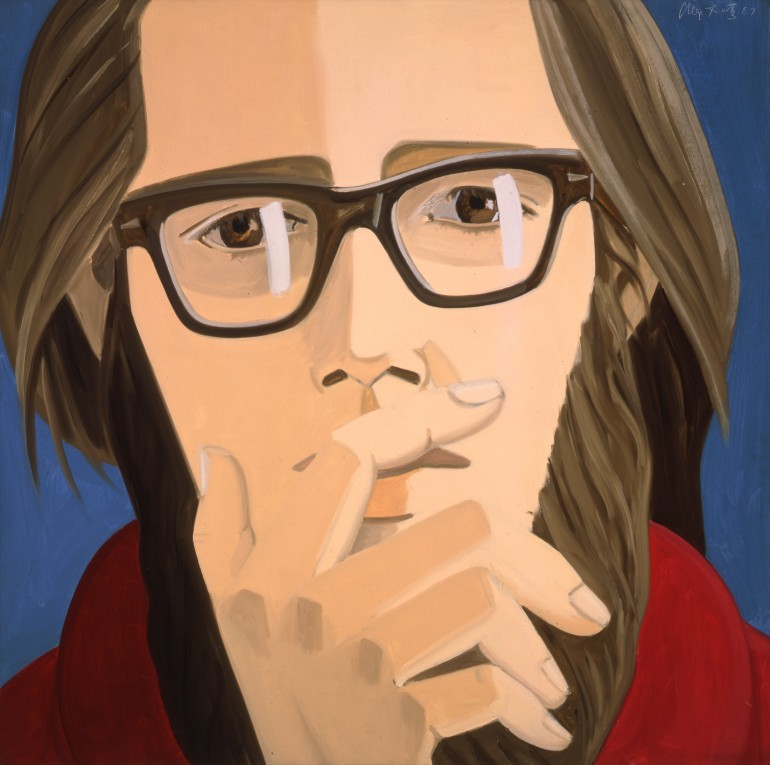
Ted Berrigan, 1967

Katz has collaborated with poets and writers since the 1960s, producing several notable editions, including "Face of the Poet", combining his images with work by poets in his circle, among them Ted Berrigan, Ann Lauterbach, Carter Ratcliff, and Gerard Malanga. He worked with John Ashbery on the publications "Fragment" in 1966 and "Coma Berenices" in 2005. He worked with Vincent Katz on "A Tremor in the Morning" and "Swimming Home". Katz also made 25 etchings for the Arion Press edition of Gloria with 28 poems by Bill Berkson. Other collaborators include Robert Creeley, with whom he produced "Edges" and "Legeia: A Libretto", and Kenneth Koch ("Interlocking Lives"). In 1962, Harper's Bazaar incorporated cutouts by Katz for a four-page fashion spread.

Numerous publications outline Katz's career's many facets: from Alex Katz in Maine published by the Farnsworth Art Museum to the catalogue Alex Katz New York published by the Irish Museum of Modern Art. Alex Katz Seeing Drawing, Making, published in 2008, describes Katz's multiple-stage process of first producing charcoal drawings, small oil studies, and large cartoons for placing the image on the canvas and the final painting. In 2005, Phaidon Press published an illustrated survey, Alex Katz, by Carter Ratcliff, Robert Storr and Iwona Blazwick. In 1989, a special edition of Parkett was devoted to Katz. Francesco Clemente, Enzo Cucchi, Liam Gillick, Peter Halley, David Salle, and Richard Prince have written essays about his work or conducted interviews with him.

== Gallery of works ==
Title	Year	Location
Ella Marion in Red Sweater	1946	Museum of Modern Art
Art School	1952	Pennsylvania Academy of Fine Arts Museum
Double Portrait of Robert Rauschenberg	1959	Colby College Museum of Art
The Black Dress	1960	Museum Brandhorst
The Red Smile	1963	Whitney Museum
Blue Umbrella 2	1972	Collection of Peter Blum, NYC
Red Tie	1979	Museum of Modern Art
Red Coat	1982	Metropolitan Museum of Art
Soho Morning	1987	San Francisco Museum of Modern Art
Purple Wind	1995	Metropolitan Museum of Art
Tan Woods	1998	Colby College Museum of Art
Yellow House 2	2001	Art Institute of Chicago
Winter Landscape	2007	High Museum of Art
Black Hat 2	2010	The Albertina
CK 17	2017	Whitney Museum
Dancers 5	2021	Colby College Museum of Art
Ada	2023	Colby College Museum of Art
Trees on Red 4	2024	Personal Collection of the Artist

== Exhibitions ==
Since 1951, Katz's work has been the subject of more than 200 solo exhibitions and nearly 500 group exhibitions throughout the United States and internationally. Katz's first solo show was an exhibition of paintings at the Roko Gallery in New York in 1954. In 1974, the Whitney Museum of American Art showed Alex Katz Prints, followed by a traveling retrospective exhibition of paintings and cutouts titled Alex Katz in 1986. The subject of more than 200 solo exhibitions and nearly 500 group shows internationally, Katz has since had retrospectives at museums including the Whitney Museum of American Art, New York; Brooklyn Museum, New York; the Jewish Museum, New York; the Irish Museum of Modern Art, Dublin; Colby College Museum of Art, Maine; Staatliche Kunsthalle, Baden-Baden; Fondazione Bevilacqua La Masa, Venice; Centro de Arte Contemporáneo de Málaga; and the Saatchi Gallery, London. In 1998, a survey of his landscapes was shown at the P.S. 1 Contemporary Art Center, featuring nearly 40 pared-down paintings of urban or pastoral motifs.

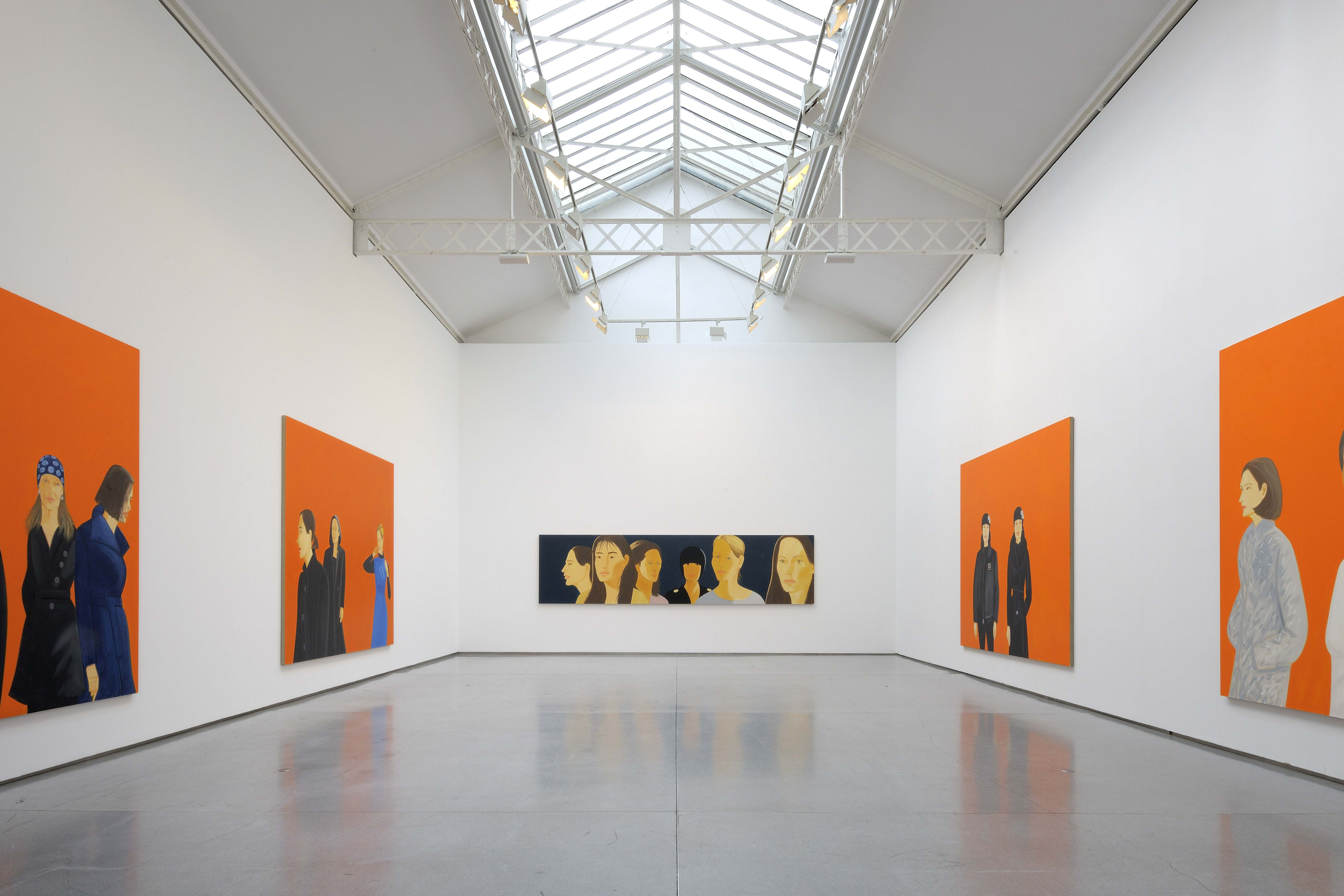
"Fashion and Studies", 2009. Galerie Thaddaeus Ropac, Paris

Katz is represented by Gladstone Gallery in New York, Timothy Taylor Gallery in London, and Galerie Thaddaeus Ropac in Paris/Salzburg. Before showing with Brown, he had been represented by Pace Gallery for 10 years and by Marlborough Gallery for 30 years.

In 2015, the Metropolitan Museum of Art exhibited the Alex Katz at The Met that spanned "nearly the entire arc of Katz's career and include drawings, prints, and paintings".

Katz's prints are distributed in Europe by Galerie Frank Fluegel in Nuremberg. In 2022, a retrospective of his work was on display at the Thyssen National Museum of Spain, the first time Katz´s work had been displayed in that country.

From October 21, 2022, to February 20, 2023, the Guggenheim Museum held a retrospective of his eight-decade career in Alex Katz: Gathering. The catalog was edited by Katherine Brinson. ISBN 9780892075607

From August 16, 2022, to February 19, 2023, the Colby Museum of Art exhibited Alex Katz: Theater and Dance, the "first comprehensive exploration of Katzʼs playful and inventive collaborations with choreographers, dancers, and members of avant-garde theater ensembles over six decades". The show traveled to Artis–Naples, The Baker Museum, Naples, Florida (October 12, 2024 - February 2, 2025), Frye Art Museum, Seattle, Washington (February 22 – June 8, 2025), Museum of Contemporary Art San Diego, San Diego, California (August 21, 2025 – January 4, 2026), and Wichita Art Museum, Wichita, Kansas (January 31, 2026 – May 10, 2026). The exhibit drew on works in the Colby's collection and archival material from the Paul Taylor Dance Company. A catalog accompanied the exhibit (ISBN 978-0-847-87146-9).

The Musée Matisse Nice exhibited Henri Matisse – Alex Katz. The Silence of Painting (Le silence de la peinture) from October 28, 2026 – January 18, 2027. "[T]he exhibition offers visitors the chance to explore Alex Katz's body of work, from his earliest pieces (Nude, 1951) to his most recent works (Lilies 13, 2025)." The exhibit pairs Katz’s work with that of Matisse and "features many rarely seen early Matisse pieces and “almost only works from Alex’s studio,” including large recent black-and-white aquatint etchings." Exhibition Guide

== Collections ==
Katz's work is in the collections of more than 100 public institutions worldwide, including the Honolulu Museum of Art; the Museum of Modern Art, New York; the Metropolitan Museum of Art, New York; the Whitney Museum of American Art, New York; the Smithsonian Institution, Washington, D.C.; the Carnegie Museum of Art, Pittsburgh; the Art Institute of Chicago; the Des Moines Art Center; the Cleveland Museum of Art; the Tate Gallery, London; the Centre Georges Pompidou, Paris; Museo Nacional Centro de Arte Reina Sofia, Madrid; the Metropolitan Museum of Art, Tokyo; the Nationalgalerie, Berlin; and the Museum Brandhorst, Munich. In 2010, Anthony d'Offay donated a group of Katz's works to the National Galleries of Scotland and the Tate; they are shown as part of the national touring programme, Artist Rooms. In 2011, Katz donated Rush (1971), a series of 37 painted life-size cutout heads on aluminum, to the Museum of Fine Arts, Boston; the piece is installed, frieze-like, in its own space.

== Recognition ==
Katz has received numerous awards, including the John Simon Guggenheim Memorial Fellowship for Painting in 1972, and in 1987 both Pratt Institute's Mary Buckley Award for Achievement and the Queens Museum of Art Award for Lifetime Achievement. The Chicago Bar Association honored Katz with the Award for Art in Public Places in 1985. In 1978, Katz received a U.S. government grant to participate in an educational and cultural exchange with the USSR. He was inducted by the American Academy of Arts and Letters in 1988, and recognized with honorary doctorates by Colby College, Maine (1984), and Colgate University, Hamilton, New York (2005). In 1990, he was elected into the National Academy of Design as an associate member, and he became a full Academician in 1994. He was named the Philip Morris Distinguished Artist at the American Academy in Berlin in 2001 and received the Cooper Union Annual Artist of the City Award in 2000. In 1994, Cooper Union Art School created the Alex Katz Visiting Chair in Painting with an endowment provided by the sale of ten paintings Katz donated, a position held first by Katz and art critic Merlin James. In 2005, Katz was the honored artist at the Chicago Humanities Festival's Inaugural Richard Gray Annual Visual Arts Series. In 2007, he was honored with a Lifetime Achievement Award from the National Academy of Design, New York.

In October 1996, the Colby College Museum of Art opened a 10,000-square-foot (930 m^{2}) wing dedicated to Katz that features more than 400 oil paintings, collages, and prints he donated. In addition, he has purchased numerous pieces for the museum by artists including Jennifer Bartlett, Chuck Close, Francesco Clemente, and Elizabeth Murray. In 2004, he curated a show at Colby of younger painters Elizabeth Peyton, Peter Doig and Merlin James, who work in the same figurative territory staked out by Katz.

In 1996, Vincent Katz and Vivien Bittencourt produced a video, Alex Katz: Five Hours, documenting the production of his painting January 3, and in 2008 he was the subject of a documentary What About Style? Alex Katz: a Painter's Painter directed by Heinz Peter Schwerfel.

== Legacy ==
Katz's work is said to have influenced many painters, such as David Salle, Helena Wurzel, Peter Halley, and Richard Prince, as well as younger artists like Peter Doig, Julian Opie, Liam Gillick, Elizabeth Peyton, Barb Januszkiewicz, Johan Andersson, and Brian Alfred.

== Bibliography ==
- Carter Ratcliff, Robert Storr, Iwona Blazwick, Barry Schwabsky, ALEX KATZ, Phaidon Press, 2014, ISBN 978-0-7148-6740-3
- Mark Rappolt, ALEX KATZ: FACE THE MUSIC, Galerie Thaddaeus Ropac, 2011, ISBN 978-3-901935-44-2
- Klaus Albrecht Schröde, ALEX KATZ: PRINTS, Hatje Cantz, 2010, ISBN 978-3-7757-2585-9
- Roland Mönig, Guy Tosatto, Timo Valjakka, Eric de Chassey, ALEX KATZ: AN AMERICAN WAY OF SEEING, 2010, ISBN 978-3-86678-263-1
- David A. Moos, ALEX KATZ: SEEING, DRAWING, MAKING, Windsor Press, 2008, ISBN 978-0-9746116-4-8
- Luca Cerizza, ALEX KATZ: FACES AND NAMES, JRP|Ringier, 2008, ISBN 978-3-905770-79-7
- Enrique Juncosa, Juan Manuel Bonet, Rachael Thomas, ALEX KATZ: NEW YORK, Charta / Irish Museum of Modern Art, 2007, ISBN 978-88-8158-634-9
- Barry Schwabsky, ALEX KATZ: THE SIXTIES, Charta, 2006, ISBN 978-88-8158-593-9
- David Cohen, Sharon Corwin, ALEX KATZ: COLLAGES, Colby College Museum of Art, Waterville, Maine, 2006, ISBN 978-0-9728484-5-9
- Carter Ratcliff, Robert Storr, Iwona Blazwick, ALEX KATZ, Phaidon, 2006, ISBN 978-0-7148-4407-7
