= Black Dress (painting) =

1960 oil on canvas painting by Alex Katz

The black Dress
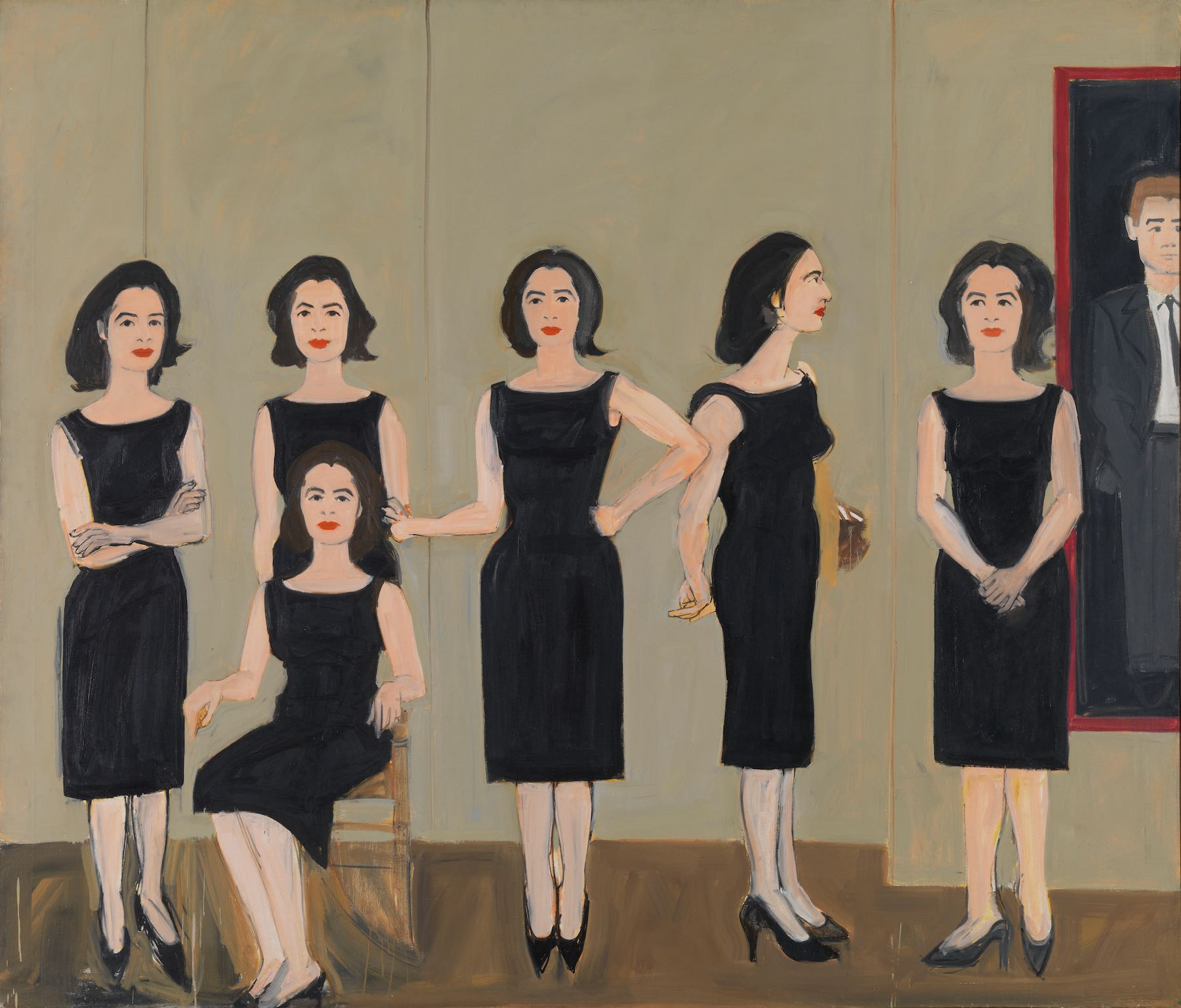
- Artist: Alex Katz
- Year: 1960
- Medium: Oil on canvas
- Location: Museum Brandhorst, Munich, Germany

Black Dress is a 1960 oil on canvas painting by Alex Katz (b. 1927) of his wife and frequent subject Ada Katz shown six times with the work employing cinematic effects. It also prominently features a repainting of a Katz portrait of the New York School poet James Schuyler in the work's backdrop.

Today the work is held in the permanent collection of the Museum Brandhorst in Munich, Bavaria, Germany. The work was loaned to the Solomon R. Guggenheim Museum in New York City and exhibited there in Katz's 2022–2023 retrospective exhibition "Gathering" at the art venue.
