= Epic (genre) =

Genre of narrative presented in a long format

Epic is a narrative genre characterised by its length, scope, and subject matter. The defining characteristics of the genre are mostly derived from its roots in ancient poetry (epic poems such as Homer's Iliad and Odyssey). An epic is not limited to the traditional medium of oral poetry, and has expanded to include modern mediums including film, theater, television shows, novels, and video games.

Epic poetry dates back millennia to works of literature predating Ancient Greece or the Hebrew Bible, such as the Epic of Gilgamesh. But critique and discourse has continuously arisen over this long period of time, with attempts to clarify what the core characteristics of the “epic” genre really are beginning only in the past two centuries as new mediums of storytelling emerged with developing technologies. Most significantly, the advent of the novel, such as classics like Tolstoy's War and Peace which began to be referred to as “epic novels”, caused critics to reconsider what can be called an “epic”. With this discussion, epic became a larger overarching genre under which many subgenres, such as epic poetry, epic novels, and epic films could fall under. However, the nebulous definitions assigned to even the long-standing ancient epics due to their ubiquitous presence across vastly differing cultures and traditions, are still a topic of discourse for today's literary academics, and have caused lingering difficulties in creating a definitive definition for the umbrella term of “epic” as a genre.

== Etymology and origin ==
Epic originally comes from the Latin word epicus, which itself comes from the Ancient Greek adjective ἐπικός (epikos) deriving from ἔπος (epos), meaning "word, story, poem."

The word "epic", throughout the years, has adapted to different meanings that stem far away from its origins. In Ancient Greece, Epic was used in the form of a noun. Epic (noun) refers to a long poem, book, movie, etc. that tells the story of a hero's adventures. The earliest epics were long poems performed out loud that told these grandiose stories about heroes. Today, in modern society, the word epic has been expanded and associated with all kinds of long literatures that still underlyingly focus on the values of a given society. It is often used as an adjective. Epic (adjective) refers to something very great or large and usually difficult or impressive. In addition, the word epic can be used to describe any media that has a large scope, that speaks about the human condition and that is ambitious with artistic goals. Star Wars, for example, is considered a modern cinematic epic.

== History ==
=== Ancient sources ===
Providing a plethora of narrative tropes, the Mesopotamian Epic of Gilgamesh, as the first recorded epic poem, would lay the foundation for the entire Western branch of the genre. Both the Old Testament and New Testament borrow many themes from Gilgamesh, which in turn has been found to draw from older Sumerian tradition. As such, some anthropologists identify Jesus as an embodiment of the same mythical archetype. Some similarities, among others, include stories of:

- the universal flood:
  - Utnapishtim in the Mesopotamian story
  - Noah in the Judeo-Christian story
- the 'tree of life' and the Garden of Eden:
  - Enkidu and Shamhat in Gilgamesh.
  - Adam and Eve in the Bible.
- the hero versus a divine assailant:
  - Gilgamesh vs Enkidu
  - Jacob vs the angel

Just as it provided a blueprint for biblical traditions, many other pre-Christian mythos and religious epics have also shown to be influenced by Gilgamesh, including those of Buddha in Buddhist tradition; Krishna in Hindu tradition; Odysseus, Perseus, and Dionysus in Greek tradition; Ra, Horus, Osiris, and Amenhotep III in Ancient Egyptian tradition; Romulus in Roman tradition; and Zoroaster/Zarathustra and Mithra in Zoroastrian tradition.

The Bible similarly extended its influence into existing epic literature such as the legend of King Arthur, which, as it exists in the modern day, has been interpreted to be loosely modeled upon the life of Jesus, however this was not always the case. Arthurian literature had originally been based on pre-Christian, Celtic folklore and may have been based on a British warrior (5th–6th century) who staved off invading Saxons. During the early christianization of the United Kingdom, the Church tolerated new converts observing their older, pagan traditions. However, as the British Church grew in power, events taking place in Europe (such as The Crusades) inspired authors to reshape the traditional legends with Christian undertones. Author Robert de Boron, for instance, translated the legend into French in 1155, in which he would conceive of the now-iconic addition of the sword-in-the-stone legend, and would expand upon the Round Table lore whereby Arthur had twelve knights just as Jesus has twelve disciples.

=== Modernity ===
Specific echelons of popular culture draw from a variety of epic narrative tropes. This may preclude to genres such as heroic fantasy, sword and sorcery, space opera, fantasy adventures, and high fantasy. Some even draw influence from each other, just as ancient sources. For example Frank Herbert's Dune Saga inspired the Star Wars trilogy and Alejandro Jodorowsky's Jodoverse.

== Types ==
=== Folk epic ===
Folk epic can be defined as the earliest form of the epic genre, which was performed and passed down in oral form. Folk epics were often sung or narrated in royal courts. These stories recounted particular mythologies and consisted of mainly made on-the-spot stories. Due to their oral handing down, early folk epic authors and performers remain unknown. The authors are presumed to have been mostly common men.

=== Literary epic ===
As the years went by there was a need to preserve these folk epics in written form and attribute value to their authors. With this increased demand, the literary epic genre emerged. Literary epic shares similarities with folk epic, but instead of being in oral form, it is presented in a written format to ensure its survival across the years. Literary epics tend to be more polished, coherent, and compact in structure and style. They most often are based on ideas of the author, that stem from their own learned knowledge. The author, unlike with folk epics, tends to be recognised.

=== Transition from folk to literary epic ===
Early famous poems such as Iliad and Odyssey, show the transition from folk to literary epics. With a need to preserve these famous stories, they were adapted to a written format. Their author known as Homer probably never existed, as the name was used to incorporate the many generations of performers who told, retold, and shaped the stories of the Iliad and the Odyssey over time.

== Elements ==
=== Length ===
It has been well-established that narrative works of extreme length can be considered “epics”. The exact length is less important than the relative length within its medium. For example, with poetry, the distinction is made between epics and lyrics, relatively long and short respectively as poetry. In film, television, or novels, just as in epic poetry, this can manifest as a series or collection of connected individual works, evoking the epic cycle.

=== Style ===
Originating once again from the style of the ancient epic, a certain level of seriousness is expected in the prose of something considered an “epic”. Put another way, to achieve the grandiosity typical of an “epic”, distance must be created from the story for the reader via the style of the prose. To further this, the work must be high quality within its medium, again to evoke “epicness”.

=== Epic hero ===
Epics are thought of as representative of a culture and a community, and something which defines a social identity, thus the epic hero is the individual representative of that. The hero is often righteous or moralistically good, especially in the ancient epic, or else above all others in some field such as combat or leadership. The hero is the vehicle by which the epic's long, difficult narrative must be carried. They must therefore be a strong, distinct, and memorable character.

=== Mythos ===
An epic tends to draw upon existing narratives, specifically within the community or culture it represents. This can be thought of as the “mythos” of the epic. In ancient epics, this was often existing, published works. In the modern context, many narratives that could be considered “epic” have developed their own mythos, such as with comic book franchises like DC, or sci-fi like Star Wars and Star Trek and fantasy like The Lord of the Rings which go so far as to develop multiple novel languages for their mythos. This creative mythos could still, however, be argued to be drawing upon existing narratives, traditions, and motifs present in cultures and communities represented in these epics.

=== Themes ===
The themes within an epic are reflected in the relationship between the epic hero and the epic setting. The concerns of an epic are greater than the individual hero's concerns; the grandiosity extends to the conflict, and the concern of the epic is the concern of the entire world within the narrative.

== Genres ==
There are many genres of epic and various mediums that have adopted such genres, including:

- Epic film: encompasses historical epics, religious epics, and western epics. However, such commonly been broken further into subgenres,
- Female epic: examines ways in which female authors have adapted the masculine epic tradition to express their own heroic visions.
- Chivalric epics from the Middle Ages.
- National epics.

Real-life stories of heroic figures have also been referred to as being epic. For example, Ernest Shackleton's exploration adventures in Antarctica.

=== Epic fantasy ===
Epic fantasy (or high fantasy) has been described as containing three elements:

1. it must be a trilogy or longer;
2. its time-span must encompass years or more; and
3. it must contain a large back-story or universe setting in which the story takes place.

J. R. R. Tolkien's The Lord of the Rings is an example of epic fantasy, though the genre is not limited to the Western tradition, for example: Arabic epic literature includes One Thousand and One Nights; and Indian epic poetry includes Ramayana and Mahabharata.
