= Alice Notley =

American poet (1945–2025)

- Born: Alice Elizabeth Notley; November 8, 1945; Bisbee, Arizona, U.S.
- Died: May 19, 2025 (aged 79); Paris, France
- Education: Barnard College (BA); University of Iowa (MFA)
- Occupation: Poet
- Notable work: The Descent of Alette, Disobedience, Culture of One, Mysteries of Small Houses, Grave of Light: New and Selected Poems, 1970-2005, Being Reflected Upon
- Spouses: Ted Berrigan (m. 1972; died 1983); Douglas Oliver (m. 1988; died 2000)
- Children: 2, including Anselm Berrigan

Alice Elizabeth Notley (November 8, 1945 – May 19, 2025) was an American poet. Notley came to prominence as a member of the second generation of the New York School of poetry. Notley's early work laid both formal and theoretical groundwork for several generations of poets and topics like motherhood and domestic life. The Paris Review described her as having been "one of America's greatest living poets".

Notley's experimentation with poetic form, seen in her books 165 Meeting House Lane, When I Was Alive, The Descent of Alette, and Culture of One, ranges from a blurred line between genres, to a quotation-mark-driven interpretation of the variable foot, to a full reinvention of the purpose and potential of strict rhythm and meter.

In addition to poetry, Notley wrote a book of criticism (Coming After, University of Michigan, 2005), a play ("Anne's White Glove"—performed at the Eye & Ear Theater in 1985), a biography (Tell Me Again, Am Here, 1982), and she edited three publications, Chicago, Scarlet, and Gare du Nord. Notley's collage art appeared in Rudy Burckhardt's film "Wayward Glimpses" and her illustrations have appeared on the cover of numerous books. As is often written in her biographical notes, "She has never tried to be anything other than a poet." She was a recipient of the Ruth Lilly Poetry Prize.

== Early life ==
Notley was born on November 8, 1945, in Bisbee, Arizona, and grew up in Needles, California. Notley wrote extensively of her childhood and early life in her book Tell Me Again (Am here, 1982).

Notley left Needles for New York City to attend Barnard College in 1963, desiring an escape from the isolation of her hometown. She received a Bachelor of Arts from Barnard College in spring 1967 and left New York City that fall for the fiction program at the Iowa Writers' Workshop at the University of Iowa. She was the only woman in her genre and one of two in the entire graduate writing department. Notley cited—in part—a reading by Robert Creeley as early inspiration for her writing more poetry. A close relationship with the poet Anselm Hollo, who was teaching at the program at that time, led to Notley leaving Iowa City for Morocco in 1968. Notley claimed that it was boring and returned to Iowa City where she met the poet Ted Berrigan who began teaching as an instructor at the school that fall.

After Notley's graduation, she and Berrigan spent periods of time in New York City and Buffalo. During the winter of 1970–71, Notley and Berrigan lived on Long Island, where Notley wrote her first book, 165 Meeting House Lane (Twenty-Four Sonnets). The book took its title from the address of their home on Long Island. In the dedication, Notley thanked Tom Clark who would go on to re-publish the sonnet cycle in his anthology All Stars. Notley and Berrigan spent the several months between Long Island and Chicago in Bolinas, California; Berrigan's C Press published 165 Meeting House Lane in Bolinas. Notley's second book, Phoebe Light, was published in 1973 by Bill Berkson's Bolinas-based press Big Sky.

== 1972–75: Chicago and Essex ==
In 1972, Notley and Ted Berrigan married and moved to Chicago where Berrigan had been appointed to Ed Dorn's newly vacated teaching position at Northeastern Illinois University. Notley and Berrigan joined an already active community of Chicago poets, including Paul Carroll, Paul Hoover, and Maxine Chernoff. Notley gave birth to their first son, Anselm Berrigan, named after Anselm Hollo, in 1972.

A group of Berrigan's students—Darlene Pearlstein, Peter Kostakis, and Richard Friedman—started a small press, The Yellow Press, which published two books by Notley. Young poets on the Chicago scene regularly hung out with Notley and Berrigan at their home and many followed the couple back to New York City in the late 1970s. The circle of younger poets who spent time with Notley and Berrigan included the aforementioned members of the Yellow Press team, Barbara Barg, Rochelle Kraut, Rose Lesniak, Bob Rosenthal, Steve Levine, Simon Schuchat, Tim Milk, and several others.

While in Chicago, Notley started publishing her magazine Chicago, a legal-sized mimeograph publication. Notley began the magazine to connect with preexisting poet friends and meet new writers on both coasts while living in the midwest. The magazine ran for eight issues, three of which were published while Notley and Berrigan lived in England. Notley edited seven of the issues with Berrigan taking over one while Notley was pregnant with their first son. The artist George Schneeman, famous for his artworks that appeared on the covers of dozens of books of poetry, did all of the covers for the magazine.

In 1974, Berrigan was hired as a visiting poet at University of Essex, so Notley and Berrigan relocated to Brightlingsea in Essex. While in England, Notley would write her second sonnet cycle Great Interiors, Wines and Spirits of the World, which was published in a Notley-themed issue of the Chicago magazine Out There.

From February through June 1974 in Wivenhoe, Essex, Notley wrote her book Songs for the Unborn Second Baby (United Artists, 1979). While Notley had written on motherhood prior to Songs, this book was her first to focus fully on the matter and is the first full-length book of a New York School-affiliated poet to address sexism in poetry, and the pressures and setbacks of motherhood in both personal and creative life. The book was reissued in 2021 by the London-based small press Distance No Object. Notley gave birth to her and Berrigan's second child, Edmund Berrigan, at Colchester Hospital in 1974.

The couple returned to Chicago for a brief period after their year in England before moving to New York City in 1976.

== 1976–1992: New York City ==
Notley and Berrigan moved their family to New York City's Lower East Side, where they live together until Berrigan's death in 1983. Their apartment at 101 St. Mark's Place was a hub for young writers and Berrigan and Notley's contemporaries. Notley remained fairly prolific during this era, writing and publishing several full-length collections. Perpetually strapped for cash, the two took on whatever small jobs they could to support the family. Notley and Berrigan were frequent instructors at Naropa University's summer writing program. Some of Notley's most famous engagements with the poetry community while in New York City were her workshops at the Poetry Project at St. Mark's Church in the Bowery, which were attended by dozens of young poets including Bob Holman, Patricia Spears Jones, Steve Carey, and Susie Timmons. Eileen Myles wrote of their experience in Notley's workshops in their books Chelsea Girls (Black Sparrow Press, 2004; Ecco, 2015) and Inferno (O/R Books, 2010). Of her 1983 workshop, Notley wrote:

I expect my workshop will be similar to past Alice Notley workshops: same old format, assignments, xeroxes, forms, occasions, geometries, kinds of poems, speculations on and practice of the lofty and the silly. I assume I've learned a little more since the last time I taught, and that I've a little more to learn in the teaching. If not, boo hoo.

In 1986, Notley led a workshop where participants were required to write an entire book during the course of their meetings. After the workshop ended, Notley teamed up with students to print copies of their works on the mimeograph machine in the St. Mark's basement. The books were published under the imprint Unimproved Editions and Notley made cover art for the majority of the titles. Her own book, entitled Parts of a Wedding, was published first in a small edition by Unimproved Editions then later as a section of the O Books anthology O One.

Berrigan's death in 1983 struck the poetry community exceptionally hard and over the next decade, Notley would suffer the loss of many others who were close to her. Notley's 1985 play "Anne's White Glove," commissioned by Ada Katz's Eye and Ear Theater navigated the pain of Berrigan's death, and her collections Margaret & Dusty (Coffee House, 1985), Parts of a Wedding (Unimproved Editions, 1986), and At Night the States (The Yellow Press, 1987) contain material written during a period of mourning. Notley's elegiac work during this era, including her poems "Beginning With a Stain" and "At Night the States," is some of her most widely celebrated.

== 1992–2025: Paris ==
In 1992, Notley moved to Paris with her second husband, the British poet and novelist Douglas Oliver (1937–2000), whom she had met while living in England in 1974, and had married in 1988. They worked on two magazines together, Gare du Nord and Scarlet, and self-published a compendium of their own books, The Scarlet Cabinet, which contained Notley's Descent of Alette. Descent would be Notley's most widely read and taught collection after its reprinting by Penguin books in 1996. Notley remained in Paris but made several trips to the United States each year to give readings and teach small workshops. Some have linked Notley's geographical move to Paris—since it followed a period of intensely personal writing—as also marking a creative distance between herself and her poems, though her books Mysteries of Small Houses (Penguin, 1998), and Culture of One (Penguin, 2011) engage very much with personal matter.

In 1999, Notley was a finalist for the Pulitzer Prize and a winner of the Los Angeles Times Book Prize for Poetry. In spring 2001, she received an award from the American Academy of Arts and Letters and the Poetry Society of America's Shelley Memorial Award. This period also marked an increase in scholarly interest in Notley's work.

Notley stayed very involved in the preservation of both Berrigan and Oliver's works, having edited and written introductions for a number of their books, and she continued to be a prolific and powerful force in contemporary poetry, winning the Lenore Marshall Poetry Prize in 2007 and the Ruth Lilly Poetry Prize in 2015. Several poems from her 2007 collection In the Pines were set to music by the Canadian indie pop band AroarA for their 2014 Polaris Music Prize-nominated 2013 EP In the Pines and in August 2014, a conference celebrating Notley's work was held by the Bay Area Public School system in Oakland, California. Over two nights, November 14 and 15, 2016, Notley read The Descent of Alette in its entirety at The Lab in San Francisco.

Notley died from a stroke at a Paris hospital, on May 19, 2025, at the age of 79. At the time of her death, she also had ovarian cancer. Her memorial was held at the Poetry Project at St. Mark's Church in-the-Bowery on Nov. 19, 2025.

== Bibliography ==
1970s

- Poems & stories (thesis, unpublished) (University of Iowa, 1970)
- 165 Meeting House Lane (C Press, 1971)
- Phoebe Light (Big Sky, 1973)
- Incidentals in the Day World (Angel Hair, 1973)
- For Frank O'Hara's Birthday (Reality Street, 1976)
- Alice Ordered Me to Be Made (The Yellow Press, 1976)
- A Diamond Necklace (Frontward Books, 1977)
- Songs for the Unborn Second Baby (United Artists, 1979; reprint Distance No Object, 2021)

1980s

- Dr. Williams' Heiresses (Tuumba, 1980)
- When I Was Alive (Vehicle Editions, 1980)
- How Spring Comes (Toothpaste Press, 1980)
- Waltzing Matilda (Kulchur Press, 1981; reprint Faux Press, 2002) ISBN 9780936538044
- Tell Me Again (Am Here/Immediate Editions, 1982)
- Sorrento (Sherwood Press, 1984)
- Margaret & Dusty: Poems. Coffee House Press. 1985. ISBN 978-0-918273-08-6.
- Parts of a Wedding (Unimproved Editions, 1986)
- At Night the States (The Yellow Press, 1988)
- From a Work in Progress (Dia Foundation, 1988)

1990s

- Homer's Art (Institute of Further Studies, 1990)
- The Scarlet Cabinet (with Douglas Oliver) (Scarlet Editions, 1992)
- Selected Poems of Alice Notley (Talisman House, 1993)
- To Say You (Pyramid Atlantic, 1994)
- Close to Me and Closer...(The Language of Heaven) and Desamere (O Books, 1995)
- The Descent of Alette. Penguin Group US. 1996. ISBN 978-1-4406-2143-7.
- Mysteries of Small Houses. Penguin Group US. 1998. ISBN 978-1-4406-2125-3.
- Byzantine Parables (Cambridge, 1998)

2000s

- Disobedience. Penguin Books. 2001. ISBN 978-0141002293.
- Iphigenia (Belladonna, 2002)
- From the Beginning (The Owl Press, 2005)
- City of (Rain Taxi, 2005)
- Coming After. University of Michigan Press. 2005. ISBN 9780472098590.
- Alma, Or, The Dead Women. Granary Books. 2006. ISBN 9781887123723.
- In the Pines. Penguin Group US. 2007. ISBN 978-1-4406-1977-9.
- Grave of Light: New and Selected Poems, 1970-2005. Wesleyan University Press. 2008. ISBN 978-0-8195-6773-4.
- Above the Leaders (Veer Books, 2008)

2010s

- Reason and Other Women. Chax Press. 2010. ISBN 978-0925904843.
- Culture of One. Penguin Group US. 2011. ISBN 9781101502037.
- Songs and Stories of the Ghouls. Wesleyan University Press. November 15, 2011. ISBN 978-0-8195-7153-3.
- Secret ID (The Catenary Press, 2012)
- Negativity's Kiss (Presses universitaires de Rouen et du Havre, 2013)
- Manhattan Luck (Heart's Desire, 2014)
- Benediction. Letter Machine Editions. 2015. ISBN 978-0988713734.
- Certain Magical Acts (Penguin Poets, 2016)
- Eurynome's Sandals (Presses universitaires de Rouen et du Havre, 2019)

2020s

- For the Ride (Penguin Poets, 2020) ISBN 9780143134572
- Runes and Chords. Archway Editions. 2021. ISBN 9781576879764.
- Get the Money!: Collected Prose (1961-1983) (City Lights Books, 09/13/2022) ISBN 9780872868953 Get the Money!
- The Speak Angel Series. Fonograf Editions. February 21, 2023. ISBN 9781737803621.
- Telling the Truth as It Comes Up: Selected Talks & Essays 1991-2018 (Song Cave, 11/15/2023)
- Being Reflected Upon (Penguin Poets, 2024) ISBN 9780143137979
