= Museum Brandhorst =

Museum in Munich, Germany

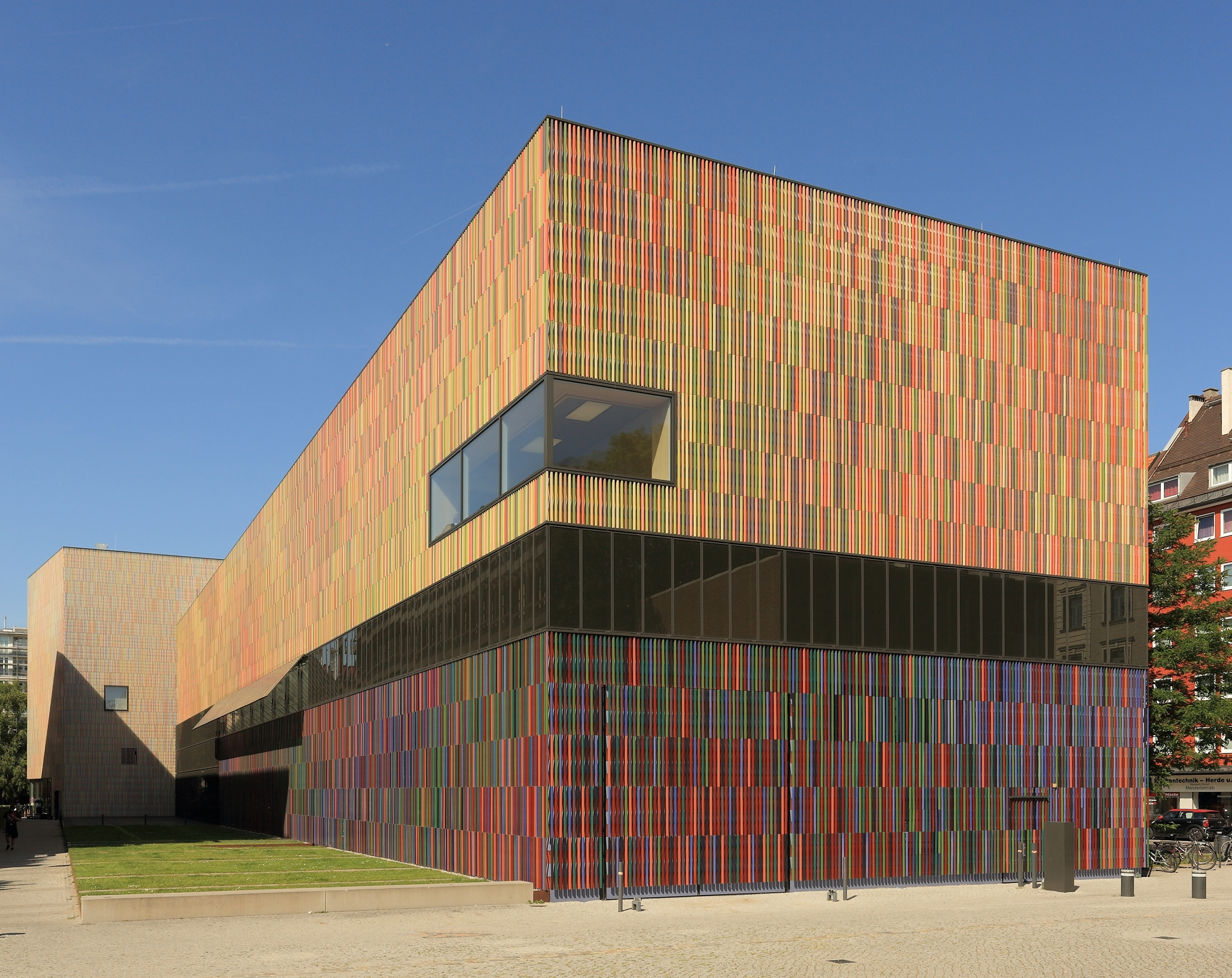
- Museum Brandhorst in Munich, 2014
- Interactive map of the Museum Brandhorst area

General information
- Type: Modern Art Museum
- Location: Munich, Germany, Theresienstraße 35a, D 80333 München
- Coordinates: 48°8′53″N 11°34′27″E

Design and construction
- Architecture firm: Sauerbruch Hutton

The Brandhorst Museum was opened in Munich on 21 May 2009. It displays about 200 exhibits from the modern art collection of the heirs of the Henkel trust Udo and Anette Brandhorst. In 2009 the Brandhorst Collection comprises more than 700 works.

== History ==
Anette Brandhorst, the great-granddaughter of Henkel's founder, and her husband Udo Fritz-Hermann began collecting art in 1971. When Anette died of cancer in 1999, her husband Udo donated the collection to the state of Bavaria on the proviso that the state build it a fitting home. The construction costs of $67 million were funded by Bavaria.

== The building ==
The building with its long, two-storey, rectangular structure and multi-coloured facade composed of 36,000 vertical ceramic louvres in 23 different coloured glazes, was created by Sauerbruch Hutton architects and is located next to the Pinakothek der Moderne in the Kunstareal. The building has three exhibition areas which are connected by stairs. All galleries (with the exception of the Media Suite) have white walls and wooden floorboards of Danish oak.

== Collection ==
The museum displays a comprehensive selection of about 100 works of Andy Warhol (Hammer and sickle, 1976, The Last Supper, 1986) and more than 60 works of Cy Twombly, making it the largest Twombly collection outside the US. The monumental series by Twombly, titled Lepanto, refers to a naval battle in 1571 between the Ottoman and Holy League forces. One of the museum's rooms, an irregular octagon, was created specifically to house the Lepanto cycle, a painting in 12 parts.

- Cy Twombly: Bacchus; Summer Madness; Untitled (Roses)
- Andy Warhol: Self-Portrait; Eggs; Knives; Marilyn; Natalie Wood; "Mustard Race Riot (1963)

Also other modern artists like Joseph Beuys, Mario Merz, Jannis Kounellis, Georg Baselitz, Francesco Clemente, Gerhard Richter, Bruce Nauman, Jean-Michel Basquiat, Mike Kelley, Sigmar Polke, Brian Clarke, John Chamberlain, Robert Gober, Eric Fischl, Alex Katz, and Damien Hirst are represented:

- Joseph Beuys: Wo ist mein Schmuck? Wo sind meine Scheiben, meine Zaumzeuge?
- Damien Hirst: Waste; In this terrible moment we are victims clinging helplessly to an environment that refuses to acknowledge the soul; Looking Forward to a Complete Suppression of Pain
- Sigmar Polke: Die drei Lügen der Malerei; Liberté, Egalité, Fraternité
- John Chamberlain: Lord Suckfist
- Bruce Nauman: 2 Heads on Base #1; Mean Clown Welcome
- Eric Fischl: Living Room, Scene 3 (Spinning); Japanese Bath

Works on paper by Kasimir Malevich, Kurt Schwitters and Joan Miró and others also belong to the Brandhorst collection.

The museum also houses a collection of 112 illustrated books of Pablo Picasso since Udo and Anette Brandhorst were not only interested in the fine arts, but also in literature.

Newer acquisitions include a video work by Isaac Julien, Western Union: Small Boats and the installation Large Red Sphere by Walter De Maria in the nearby Türkentor.

== Brandhorst foundation ==
Additionally, there exists in 2009 an impressive endowment of €120 million ($167 million). The interest accruing on it allows an annual acquisition budget of more than €2 million, much more than any other collection in Munich.

== Gallery ==
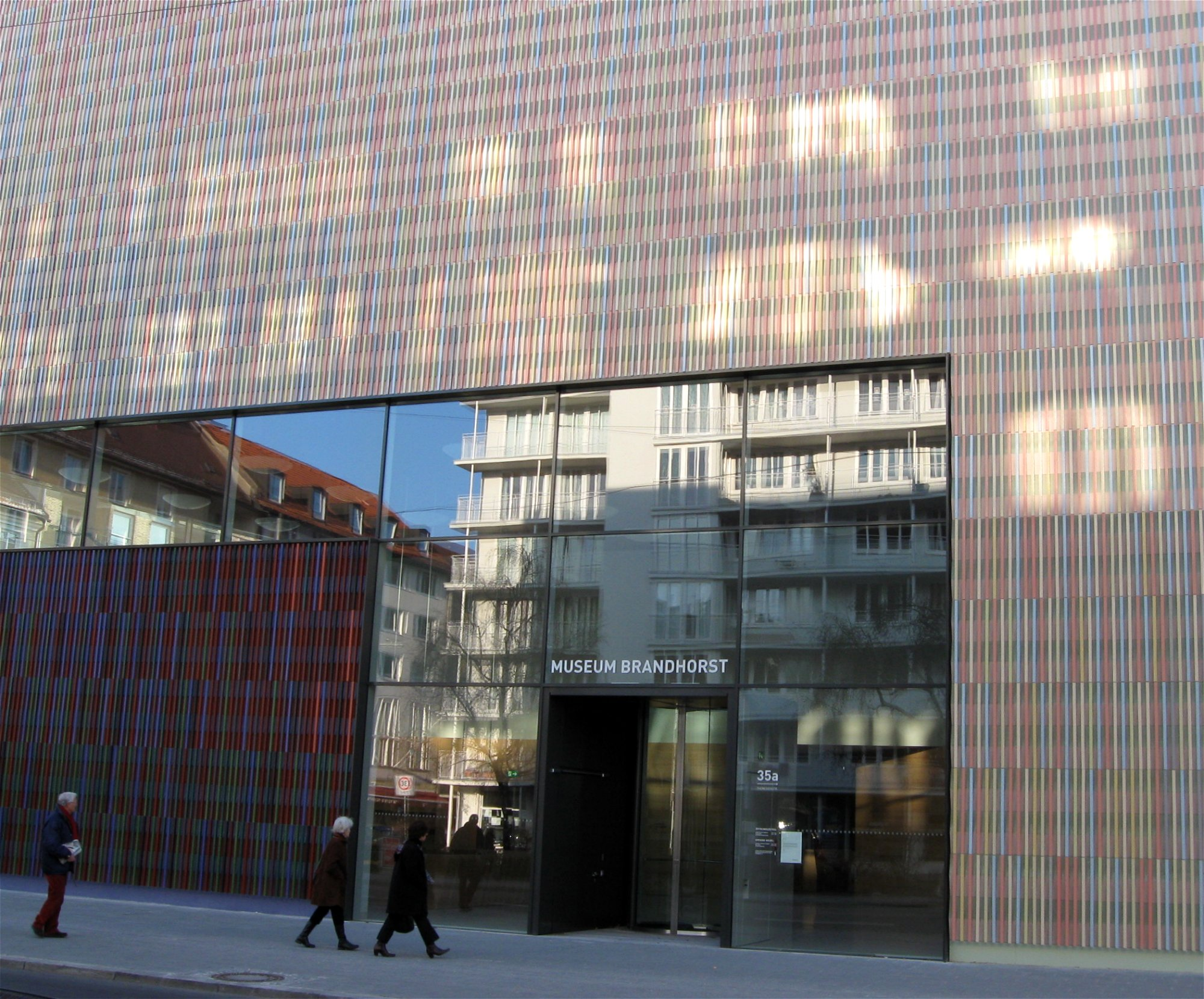
North Entrance

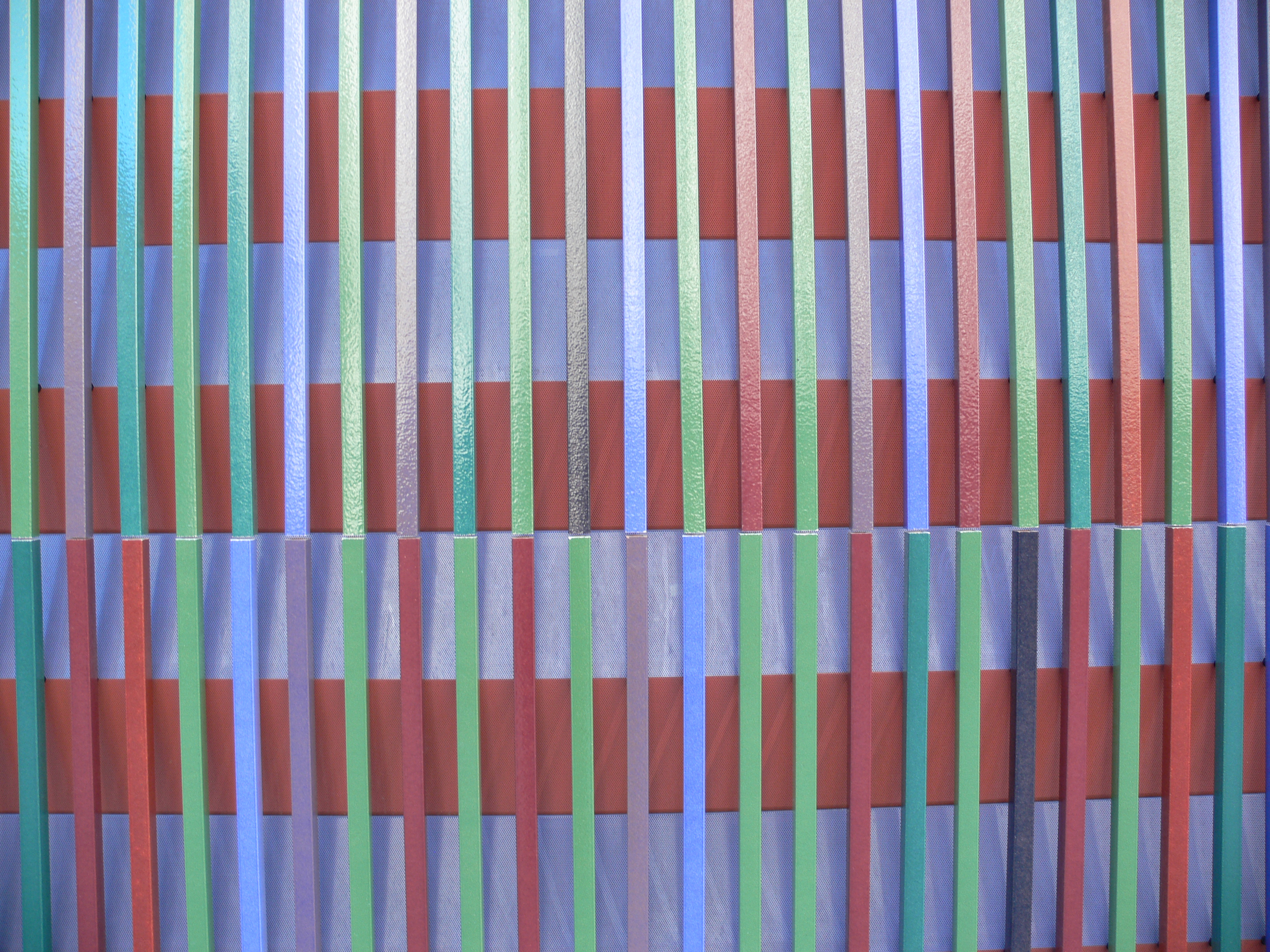
Facade Detail

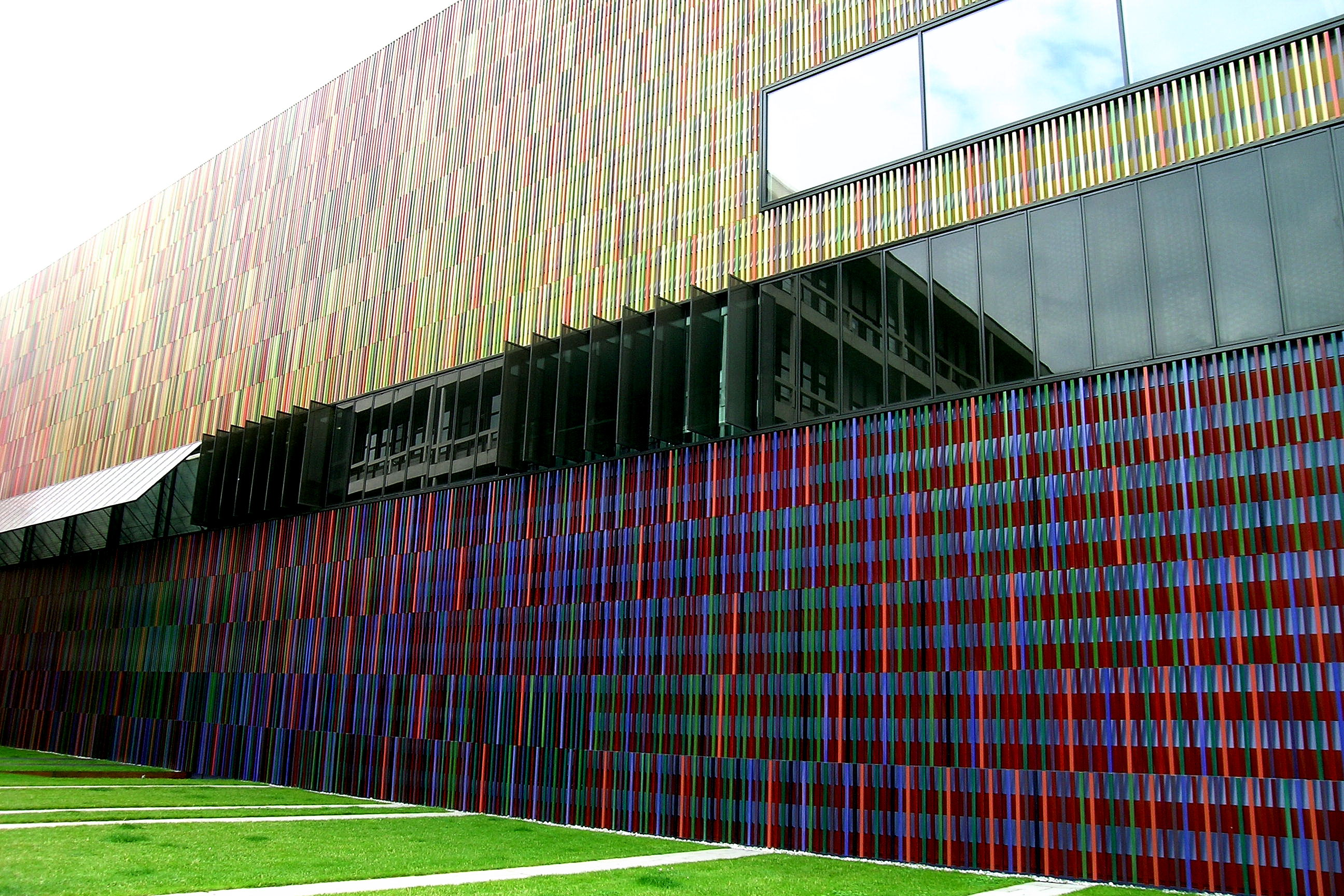

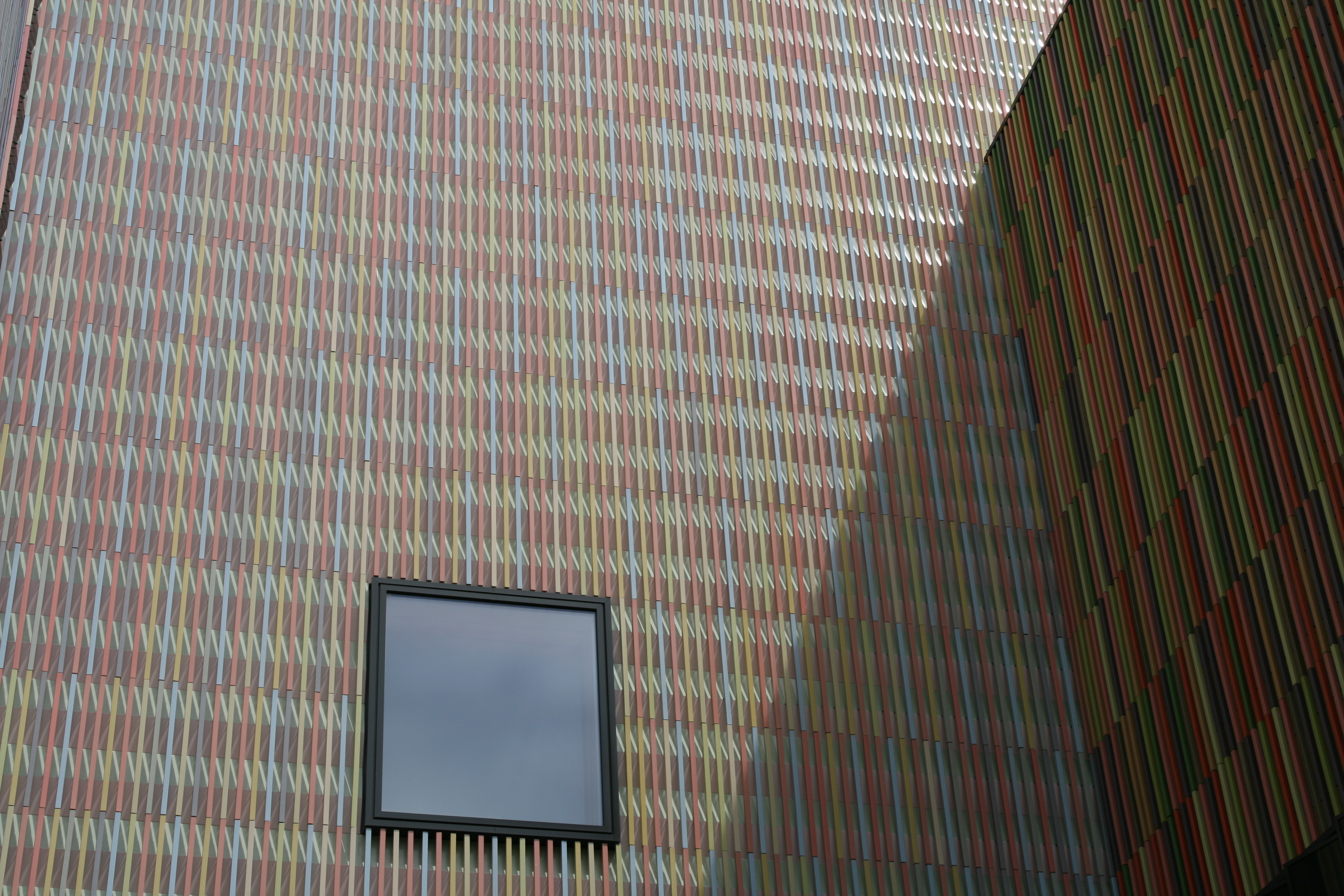

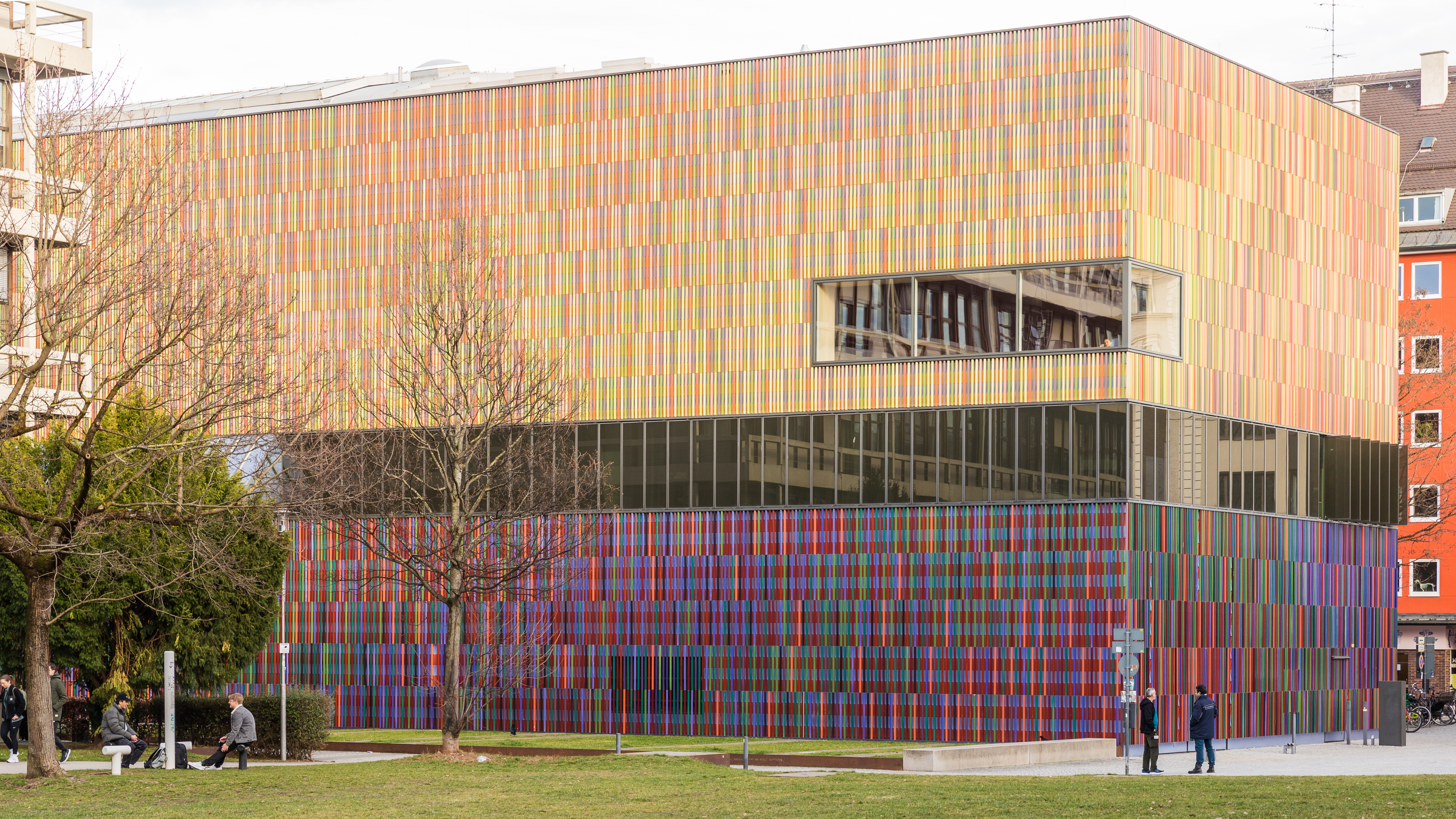

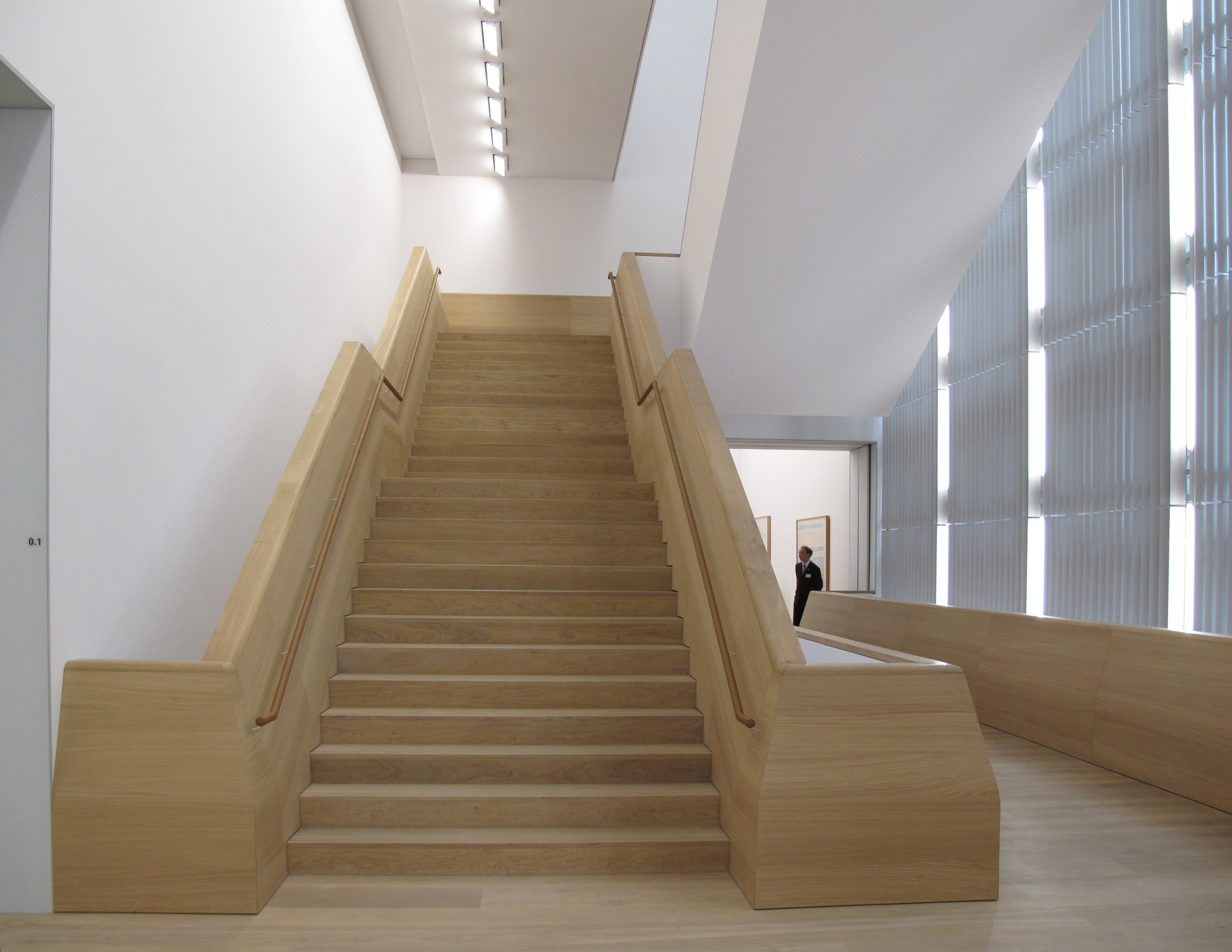

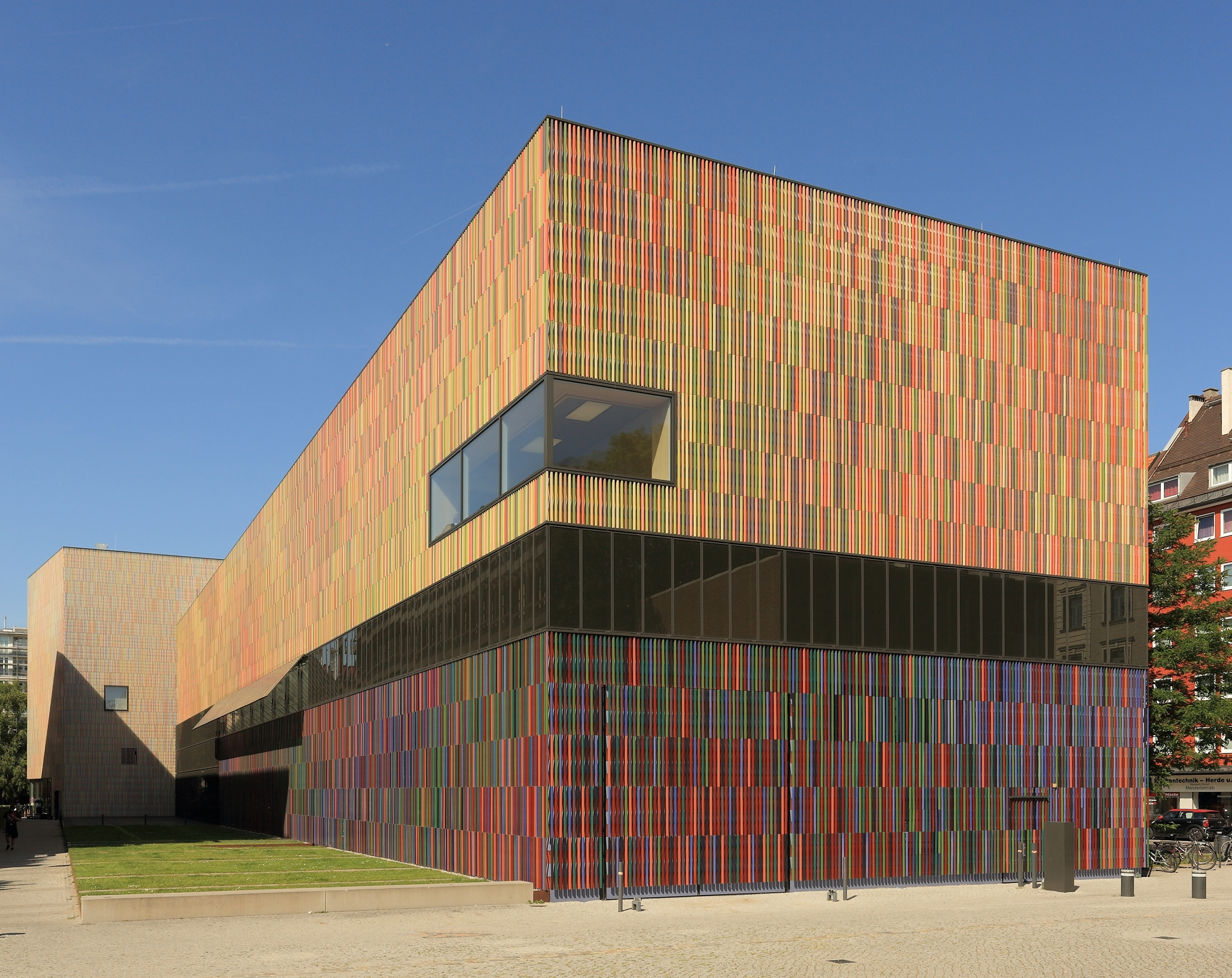

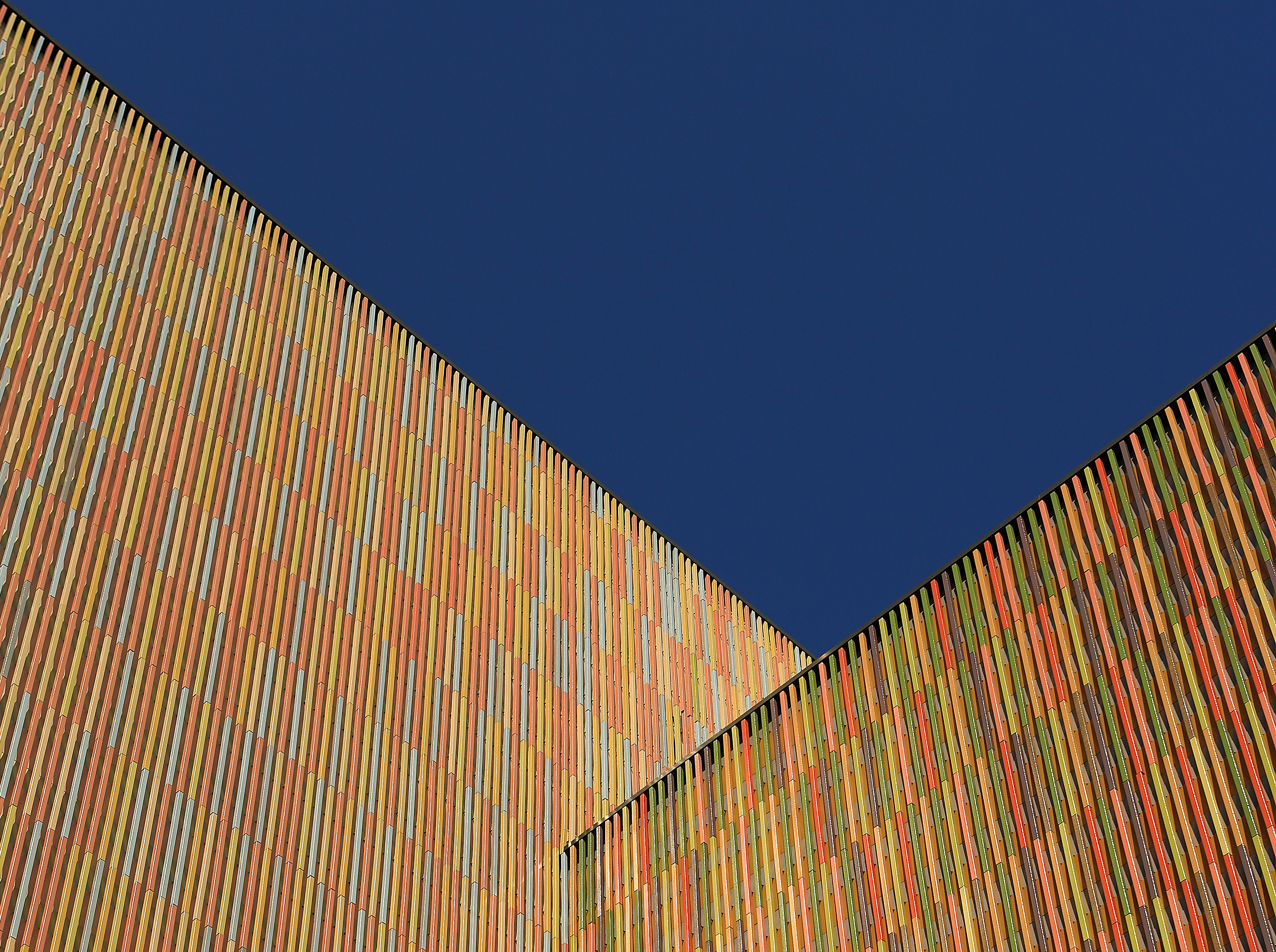
