= The Descent of Alette =

1992 book-length poem by Alice Notley

The Descent of Alette is a 1992 book-length poem by the American poet Alice Notley. The poem has been seen as offering a feminist critique of the genre of epic poetry.

The poem is notable for Notley's extensive use of quotation marks throughout, which she has described as part of her attempt to reclaim the narrative function.

The title is an acknowledgement by Notley of the ancient Sumerian poem "The Descent of Inanna", which also features a female protagonist. The journey of the protagonist is related in the first-person narrative, with their name only revealed to themselves towards the end of the piece.

The 'tyrant', a male figure who is "responsible for her amnesia, for war, and the literal suppression underground of all forms of authentic life", according to Terence Diggory in the Encyclopedia of the New York School Poets, is killed by the narrator at the end of the poem.

The narrator descends into an underground that represents life rather than death in an inversion of the traditional epic narrative. The levels of the underground through which the protagonist descends are reminiscent of specific scenes in late 1980s New York City; including a subway network populated by homeless people and the 1988 squatters occupation of Tompkins Square Park that was removed by police.

Notley read The Descent of Alette in its entirety over two nights at The Lab in San Francisco on November 14 and 15, 2016.
