= Brian Alfred =

American painter

- Born: December 2, 1974 (age 51); Pittsburgh, Pennsylvania, U.S.
- Known for: Painting, animation

Brian Alfred (born 2 December 1974, in Pittsburgh, Pennsylvania) is an artist based in Brooklyn, New York.

== Education ==
Alfred received his Bachelors of Fine Art degree from Penn State University and his Masters of Fine Art degree from Yale University. He also attended the Skowhegan School of Painting and Sculpture in Maine.

== Creative works ==
He has had solo shows at Miles McEnery Gallery, Haunch of Venison, Mary Boone Gallery, SCAI the Bathhouse, Sandroni Rey Gallery, and Max Protetch Gallery amongst others. His first museum survey show was held at the Phoenix Art Museum in 2004. He has also shown in museum shows at the Solomon R. Guggenheim Museum, the Den Frie Udstillingsbygning in Copenhagen, the Palazzo delle Papesse in Sienna, Italy, the Shizuoka Prefecture Museum of Art in Shizuoka, Japan, the Contemporary Art Center Museum in Cincinnati, Ohio and Kunstmuseum Wolfsburg, Germany among others. His animation Help Me was featured on the Times Square NBC Astrovision screen as part of Creative Time's 59th Minute. Other animations have been shown in film festivals worldwide, like the OneDotZero fest, Art Film at Art Basel, Eyebeam, The Big Screen Project at Eventi plaza and other venues. A documentary about Alfred, called ArtFlick 001, was featured at the Sundance Film Festival. Alfred is in the collection of museums including the Solomon R. Guggenheim Museum, New York, the Whitney Museum of American Art, New York, the San Francisco Museum of Modern Art, California, the Denver Art Museum, Colorado, the Albright-Knox Art Gallery, New York, the Phoenix Art Museum, the National Gallery of Victoria, Australia, Montclair Art Museum, New Jersey and the Orange County Museum of Art, California. His awards include the Joan Mitchell Foundation Award, the American Academy of Arts and Letters Purchase Award, the Penn State Alumni Achievement Award, the New York Foundation of the Arts Inspiration Award and a two time Pollock-Krasner Foundation Grant recipient.

== Music career ==
He was in a band called 33.3 which released two albums on Aesthetics Records in Chicago. He is active in the music community and has worked with many musicians including Flying Lotus, Nosaj Thing, Nobukazu Takemura, Evax, Ghislain Poirier, The One AM Radio, Roberto Carlos Lange, Sawako, Lineland, Ian Williams, Opiate, Pan American, Schneider ™, Jeremy Boyle, Loscil, Static, Shuta Hasunuma, Lullatone, Erock, Jon Sheffield, Rei Harakami, SND and others. He has created catalogs where musicians created songs in relation to his work and also collaborated with musicians on creating multiple soundtracks to his animations. Evan Mast was a DJ at one of his openings at Protetch and handed out promo CDs of his band 'Cherry' which went on to become RATATAT. Brian Alfred's work spans a wide range of imagery. His early work consisted mostly of images of architecture and landscape dealing with locations of events such as an exploding fireworks factory, an overcrowded city, housing projects, geodesic domes, radar towers, airports, etc. In 2006 he started a project of painting 333 portraits of people of influence called 'Millions Now Living Will Never Die'. He has painted and animated such subjects as freedom fighters, protest marches, volcanic plumes, office buildings, spiritual leaders and many others. Recent work has the subject of auto racing as a subject. Alfred also has been involved over the past as a curator. His first curated event was an animation screening event in conjunction with his exhibit at Max Protetch which featured artists such as PaperRad, Cory Arcangel, Bob Linder, LoVid and others. He also curates for the Brooklyn-based artist collaboration company Woodpoint & Kingsland. They have collaborated with artists such as Diana Al-Hadid, Diana Al-Hadid, Ky Anderson, Kevin Appel, Katherine Bernhardt, Iona Rozeal Brown, Dzine, Austin Eddy, Chie Fueki, Luis Gispert, Tomokazu Matsuyama, Laurel Nakadate, Garth Weiser, Jules DeBalincourt, Ridley Howard and others. He curated a show called Black/White at Lamontagne Gallery featuring work by Dana Schutz, James Siena, Frederick Hammersley and others.
