= Ada Katz =

Wife and model of American artist Alex Katz

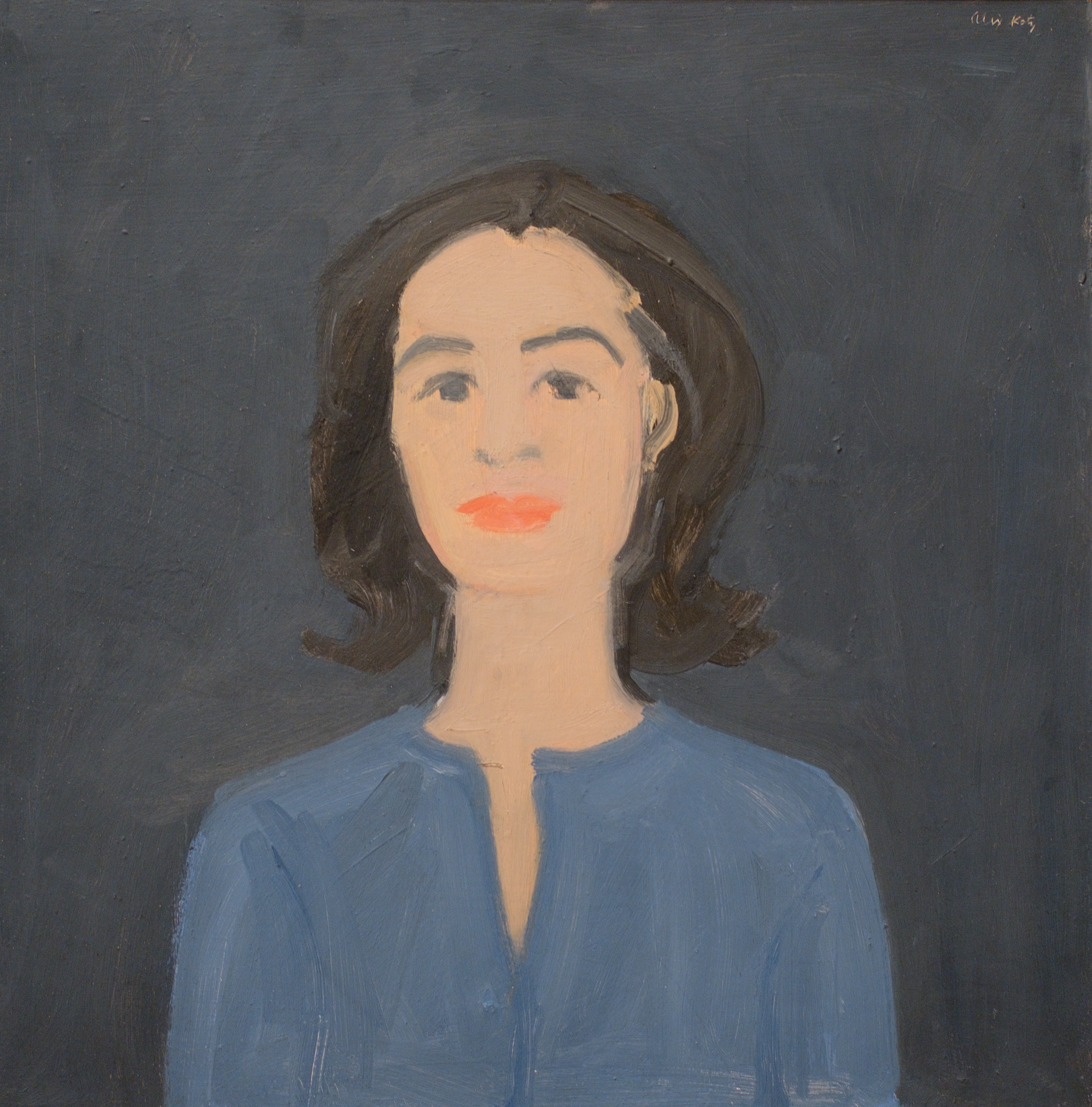
- Katz depicted in Ada on Blue (1959)
- Born: May 30, 1928 (age 98); The Bronx, New York, U.S.
- Education: Brooklyn College, New York University, University of Maryland, University of Milan
- Spouse: Alex Katz (m. 1958)

Ada Katz (born May 30, 1928) is the wife and model of Alex Katz. Perhaps best known for appearing in over 1000 of her husband's paintings including Black Dress (1960), Katz was also a biologist at Sloan Kettering, as well as one of the founders of the Eye and Ear Theater.

== Life ==
Ada Katz (née Del Moro) was born on May 30, 1928, in the Bronx to Vincenzo Del Moro and Luisa Del Moro (née Verre), both of whom were from the town of Vasto, Italy. Her parents had both immigrated independently to New York City before reconnecting in the mid-1920s. Katz's father Vincenzo, a typesetter for a local newspaper, had been forced to leave Italy because of his opposition to the rise of Italian Fascism. Upon his arrival in New York, Del Moro found work for Il Progresso, an Italian-language newspaper based in lower Manhattan. Katz's mother, Luisa, was a seamstress who for many years made most of her daughter's clothing. Ada was the youngest of three children, with an older sister, Angela, and an older brother, Luigi. The family lived on 228th Street in the Bronx.

Katz attended Evander Childs High School, then Brooklyn College, where she graduated with a B.S. in biology in 1950. Katz's siblings had attended New York University, but after starting there herself she elected to go to Brooklyn College (to and from which she spent four hours per day commuting) because of its lower tuition costs. She continued her studies at the University of Maryland, and graduated from New York University with an M.S. in biology in 1955. In 1957, she went to the University of Milan on a Fulbright fellowship. On her return, she began working at Memorial Sloan Kettering Cancer Center. Katz had a distinguished career at Sloan Kettering, despite being one of the only women employed in the laboratory.

While on her Fulbright, she met several people who would remain important to her, including Margaret De Popolo, Tom Boutis and his wife Betty, and Eric Von Schmidt. It was through Boutis that she met the painter Alex Katz, to whom she is married and has been for over six decades. On their first date, the two went to see Billie Holiday in concert. They married three months later on 1 February 1958. Alex, who had been spending the past few summers in Maine, commented, "She said she would not go to Maine with me unless we got married, so we did it." The couple would establish a presence in Lincolnville, Maine, where they still reside during the summertime. On June 4, 1960, they had a child, Vincent. The birth of Vincent was a pivotal moment in Ada's life; she decided to give up her position at Sloan Kettering to focus on motherhood.

In addition to familial responsibilities, Katz was a crucial element of her husband's enterprise. Beyond her iconic role as his muse, Ada played a key role in the management of the studio. The couple was active in the artist co-op scene of the time, moving to their SoHo loft in 1968, one of the earliest Artist cooperatives in the neighborhood.

In 1979, she co-founded the Eye and Ear Theater, along with Mac McGinnes and Roy Leaf. Inspired by the poet and artist theaters of the 1950s and early 1960s, the organization sought to encourage artistic collaboration through Off Broadway productions of plays written by poets with sets and costumes designed by painters and sculptors. Poets and artists involved included John Ashbery, Edwin Denby, Laura Dean, Paul Taylor, Red Grooms, David Hockney and Jennifer Bartlett.
