= Kaiko =

- Pronunciation: /kəɪˈkoʊ/ /keɪˈkoʊ/
- Gender: Male

Origin
- Origin: Arabic, Hawaiian, Japanese
- Meaning: Arabic: "blessed king", "divine royalty", "leader" or "protected"; Hawaiian: "current of the ocean"; Japanese: "child of the sea"

Other names
- Related names: Kayqubad, Kaikō, Kaiko Moti

Kaiko is a male given name found commonly in South Asia, the Middle East, and Central Asia.
In Arabic, Kaiko (كيقباد) means "blessed king," "divine royalty," "leader," or "protected" and is derived from the name of the Sultan of Rum, Kayqubad I.

Kaikō is a Japanese-language surname.

== People ==
- Takeshi Kaikō (1930–1989), prominent Japanese novelist
- Kaiko Moti (1921–1989), Franco-Indian painter and printmaker
- Kaiko, brother of Kaukuna Kahekili, Hawaii

== Other ==
- Kaiko (mountain), a mountain in the Andes of Peru
- Kaikō Maru, a spotter ship for the Japanese whaling fleet, circa 2007
- Kaikō ROV (海溝, "Ocean Trench"), a remotely operated underwater vehicle (ROV) built by the Japan Agency for Marine-Earth Science and Technology (JAMSTEC)
