= Presser =

Presser is a surname. Notable people with the surname include:

== People ==
- Bill Presser, high-ranking official in the Teamsters union and a participant in organized crime.
- Bram Presser (born 1976), Australian musician
- Elena Presser (born 1940), Argentine artist
- Gábor Presser (born 1948), Hungarian musician, composer, singer
- Harriet Presser (1936–2012), American sociologist and demographer
- Jackie Presser (1926–1988), American union boss involved in organized crime
- Jacques Presser (1899–1970), Dutch historian and writer
- Josef Presser (1890–1967), American artist
- Leon Presser (born 1940), American businessman
- Michael Presser, American theatre producer
- Volker Presser (born 1982), German materials scientist
- William Presser (1916–2004), American music composer and publisher

== Other ==
- Press conference, "presser" is an informal term
- Presser v. Illinois, a US court ruling on gun control

== See also ==
- Pressor, medication to increase blood pressure
