= Siri Rathsman =

Swedish surrealist artist

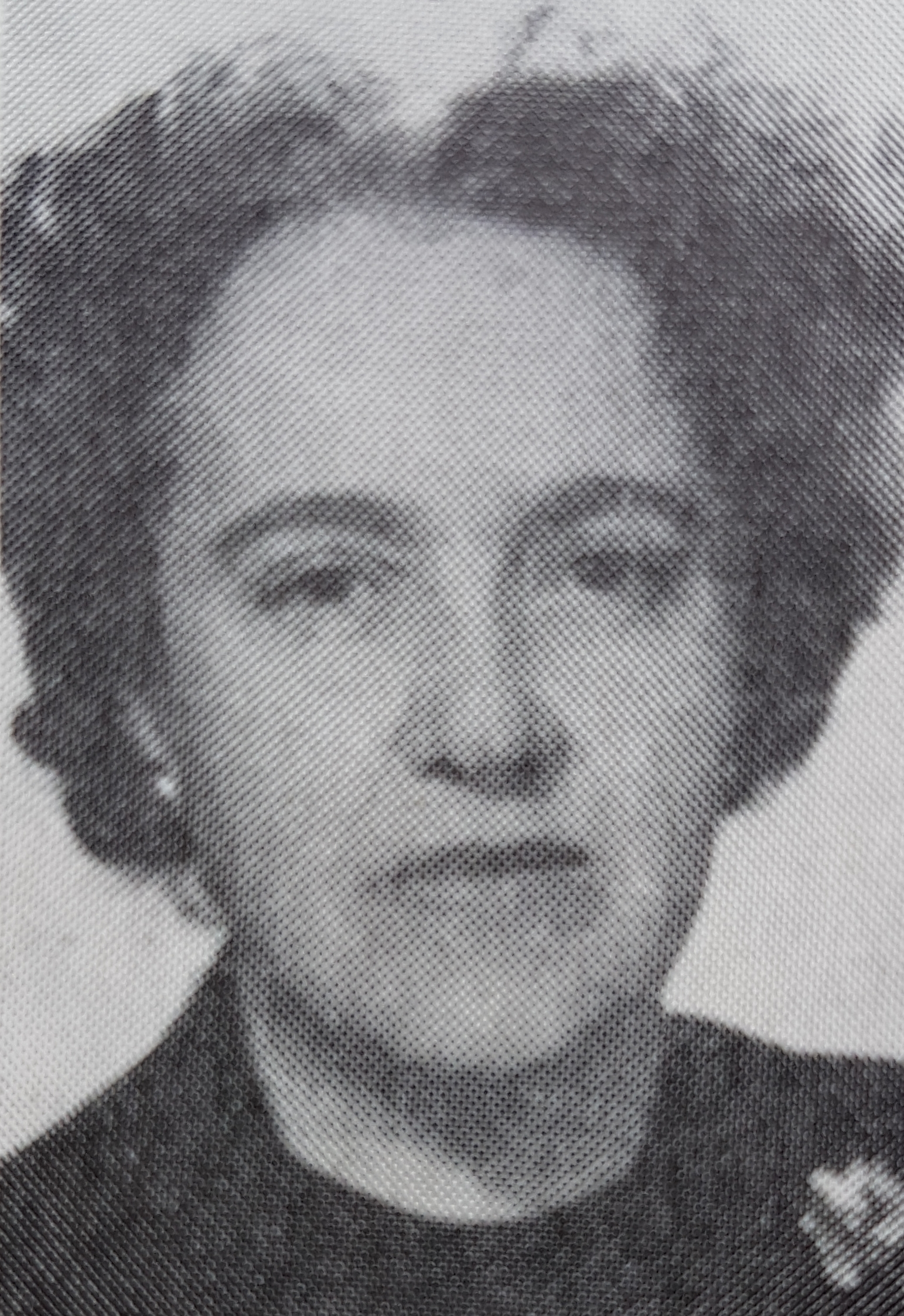
Siri Rathsman.

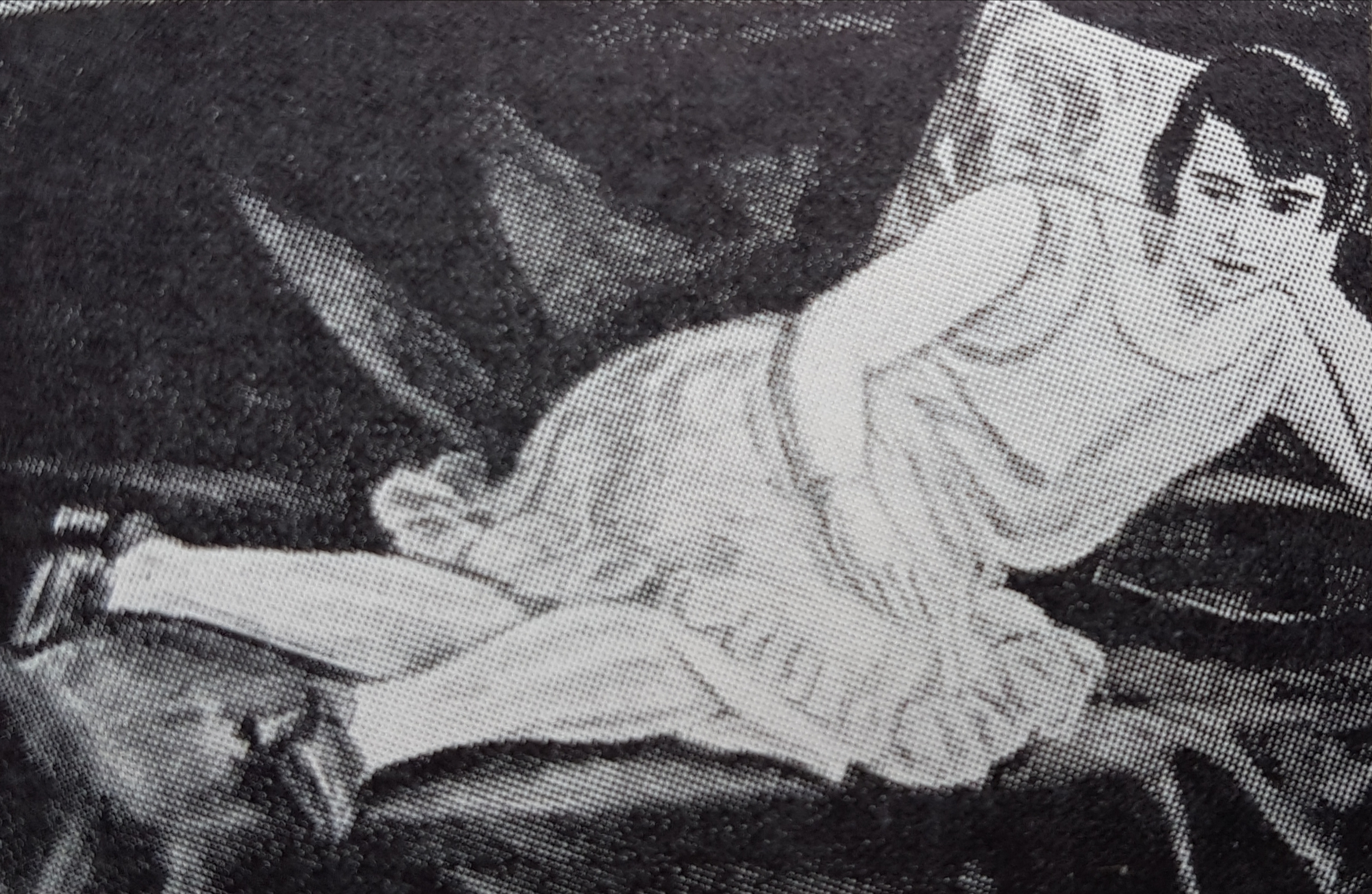
Siri Rathsman portrayed by Birger Simonsson.

Siri Lovisa Rathsman (July 28, 1895 – July 30, 1974) was a Swedish surrealist artist, printmaker, painter, ceramicist, and journalist who spent much of her life in Paris. She was born in Sundsvall, Sweden and died in the Brännkyrka parish of Stockholm.

== Early life and education ==
Siri Rathsman was the daughter of Richard Christoffer Rathsman and Kristina (Kerstin) Lovisa Jacobson.

She received a formal painting from 1913 to 1915 education at the Wilhelmson painting school under the tutelage of Carl Wilhelmson where she befriended artists such as Kurt Jungstedt. She continued her studies at the Valand Academy of the Arts, which was then known as University of Gothenburg's drawing and painting school. There, she was taught by Birger Simonsson. She was trained in figurative and objective art. Her oeuvre, however, evolved to feature non-figurative art. During her twenties she moved to Paris, where she spent much of her life. At the Académie Moderne in Paris, she studied for Othon Friesz and Raoul Duffy. In 1921, she studied with Diego Rivera.

== Career ==
Rathsman was active in Paris from 1916 or 1919-1966 and worked as both an artist and journalist.

=== Artist ===
Rathsman was involved in the workshops at Atélier 17, a studio run by Stanley William Hayter. There, she worked in the graphic studio alongside other artists such as Nina Negri and Dalla Husband. Alongside Negri and Husband, she used the principles of surrealist automatism. In 1936, she signed the Dimensionist Manifesto, which was published by Charles Sirato. This manifesto encouraged artists to engage with mathematical and scientific discoveries, including Albert Einstein's Theory of General Relativity.

=== Journalist ===
Rathsman also worked as a journalist. She spent some time writing for the Swedish newspaper Sundsvallposten. Then, from 1921 to 1966, she worked as a correspondent for the Swedish magazine Göteborgs Handels- och Sjöfartstidning; sometimes she published under the pseudonym Comtesse Belloni. The editor-in-chief in 1940 was Torgny Segerstedt. The Nazis removed Rathsman from Paris due to her being one of Segerstedt's employees. She relocated to Vichy, France, where she continued reporting. In 1943, she wrote Vichy lost the game; Descriptions from the defeated France,, an account of life in Vichy during World War II. The first chapter of the book is entitled Life in the Residential City During the First Year and contains her observations of 1940, including the influx of refugees from Belgium, the Netherlands and from Nazi occupied France. She was expelled from France and returned to Sweden, where she published her account of Vichy. She returned to France around the end of the war.

== Exhibitions ==
Rathsman participated in group exhibitions throughout her career in many European cities, including but not limited to Stockholm, Zurich, Paris, London, and Oslo. In Paris, she exhibited alongside artists including Max Ernst and Yves Tanguy.

In 1937, she was one of the artists on display at the Nordic Surrealist Exhibition at Lund University's Scania Art Museum. In 1951, the Swedish-French art gallery held a retrospective exhibition of her work. She is said to have exhibited there more than once. In 1952, she was exhibited in Gothenburg at the Lorensberg art gallery.

== Personal life ==
Rathsman never married. She may have been in a relationship with Georges Bidault in the 1930s. She is remembered for wearing her hair short. Her pseudonym, Comtesse Belloni, comes from the location of her studio on rue Belloni.
