= Doris Seidler =

American artist

- Born: Doris Falkoff; 26 November 1912; London, England
- Died: 30 October 2010 (aged 97); New York, New York
- Known for: Painting, Printmaking
- Spouse: Bernard Seidler

Doris Seidler (née Falkoff; 26 November 1912 – 30 October 2010) was an English painter, printmaker and graphic artist.

== Biography ==
Seidler was born in London, England, on 26 November 1912.

After fears of German invasion in 1940, she moved with her Jewish husband and son, David Seidler, to New York city. There, she studied under Hayter at Atelier 17 during the second world war, learning the techniques of print-making. In 1945 she returned to England, where she had her first solo exhibitions at the art schools of Norwich, Ipswich and Great Yarmouth. She immigrated back to New York in 1948 and again studied at Atelier 17. Her first solo exhibition in New York was at Wittenborn Gallery in 1954.

Seidler is known for her use of techniques such as intaglio engraving, woodcut, lucite engraving and collage with paper. Her work is included in the collection of the Seattle Art Museum.

Seidler died on 30 October 2010, in New York City.

== Permanent collections ==
- Whitney Museum of American Art
- Museum of Modern Art, New York.
- British Museum
- Library of Congress
- Philadelphia Museum of Art
- Seattle art museum
- Pallant House Gallery
