= Atelier 17 =

Art school based in Paris, France

- Other names: Atelier Dix-Sept
- Type: Private art school
- Active: 1927–1988
- Founders: Stanley William Hayter
- Location: 17 Rue Campagne Première, Paris, France; 48°50′23″N 2°19′57″E

Atelier 17 was an art school and studio that was influential in the teaching and promotion of printmaking in the 20th century. Originally located in Paris, the studio relocated to New York City during the years surrounding World War II. It moved back to Paris in 1950.

== History ==
The Atelier 17 studio was formed as an experimental workshop for the graphic arts in Paris, France in 1927 by Stanley William Hayter (1901–1988). The studio was known for its collaborative atmosphere, with artists sharing ideas on technique and aesthetics.

The studio was located at 17 rue Campagne-Première in Paris. By 1940 the studio's founder, Hayter, left Paris as World War II was starting. He moved to New York City and reopened his Atelier 17 studio there. Originally connected to the New School, by 1945 the studio was located as East 8th Street. The studio attracted many European artists who had fled from Europe and also introduced American artists to fine art printmaking.

Hayter ran the workshop with the expectation that all the artists working there would learn from each other and become proficient in all aspects of intaglio printing. The Atelier brought together Americans with artists that had fled Europe to New York.

Hayter moved his studio back to Paris in 1950 where it continued to operate until Hayter's death in 1988. That year the studio was renamed Atelier Contrepoint and remains active.

== Techniques ==
Atelier 17 artists worked with established and experimental techniques including multi-color printing and textured patterns. Among the techniques used were aquatint, color offset printing, etching, the Grible Method, liftground, line engraving, and mezzotint.

The Atelier 17 studio created the earliest examples of viscosity printing and is credited with inventing the process.

== Artists associated with Atelier 17 ==
The catalogue for the Atelier 17 50th anniversary retrospective includes the names of artists who worked at Atelier 17.

=== Paris (1927–1939) ===
- Jankel Adler
- Rose Adler
- Werner von Alvensleben
- Flora Blanc
- Victor Brauner
- Sergio Brignoni
- John Buckland Wright
- Massimo Campigli
- Anita de Caro
- Óscar Domínguez
- Max Ernst
- Philip Evergood
- John Ferren
- Leonor Fini
- Alberto Giacometti
- Richard Gump
- Stanley William Hayter
- Gerold Heinz Luft
- Józef Hecht
- Richard Hollander
- Dalla Husband
- Buffie Johnson
- Maximillian Kolos-Vari
- Elvira Kourjoudjian
- Georges Lecoq-Vallon
- Fedor Loevenstein
- Hope Manchester
- Georg Mayer-Marton
- Salvatore Mayo
- Roderick Fletcher Mead
- Joan Miró
- Magdeleine Mocquot
- Nina Negri
- Tarō Okamoto
- Jeanne Bieruma Oosting
- Cathal Brendan O'Toole
- Wolfgang Paalen
- Gabor Peterdi
- Helen Phillips
- Anton Prinner
- Siri Rathsman
- Dickson Reeder
- Dolf Rieser
- David Smith
- Ferdinand Springer
- Hedda Sterne
- Árpád Szenes
- Yves Tanguy
- Julian Trevelyan
- Raoul Ubac
- Andre Vallon
- Luis Vargas
- Roger Vieillard
- Maria Helena Vieira da Silva
- Mary Wykeham

=== New York (1940–1955) ===
- Ellen Abbey
- E.B. Adam
- Adolf Aldrich
- Garo Antreasian
- Nemesio Antúnez
- Irene "Fif" Aronson
- Lily Ascher
- Margaret Balzer
- William Baziotes
- Frederick G. Becker
- Ben-Zion
- Harriet Berger Nurkse
- Isabel Bishop
- Grace Borgenicht
- Louise Bourgeois
- Paul Brach
- Cynthia Brants
- Theodore Brenson
- Robert Broner
- Letterio Calapai
- Alexander Calder
- Sylvia Carewe
- Marc Chagall
- Margaret Cilento
- Minna Citron
- Le Corbusier
- Ed Countey
- Ruth Cyril
- Salvador Dalí
- Worden Day
- Dorothy Dehner
- Willem de Kooning
- Sari Dienes
- Werner Drewes
- Virginia Dudley
- Carlos Dyer
- Thomas Brownell Eldred
- Christine Engler
- Francine Felsenthal
- Perle Fine
- James Flora
- Teresa D'Amico Fourpome
- Jean Eda Francksen
- Friedrich Friedel
- Sue Fuller
- Robert Gardner
- Jan Gelb
- Milton Gendel
- James Goetz
- Douglas Gorsline
- Peter Grippe
- Salvatore Grippi
- José Guerrero
- Alan Gussow
- Terry Haass
- Hazel Hanson
- Stanley William Hayter
- Joseph Heil
- Anita Heiman
- Fannie Hillsmith
- Harry Hoehn
- Harry Holtzman
- Ian Hugo
- Lotte Jacobi
- Raymond Jordan
- Reuben Kadish
- Sam Kaner
- Philip Kaplan
- Leon Karp
- Leo Katz
- Mar Jean Kettunen
- Dina Gustin Baker
- Kenneth Kilstrom
- James Kleege
- Chaim Koppelman
- Wifredo Lam
- Armin Landeck
- Mauricio Lasansky
- Ruth Leaf
- Jacques Lipchitz
- Ryah Ludins
- Malazinshas
- Reginald Marsh
- Ezio Martinelli
- Maria Martins
- Alice Trumbull Mason
- André Masson
- Matta (Sebastian Antonio Echaurren)
- Richard Meyers
- Joan Miró
- Frances Mitchell
- David Moore
- Norma Morgan
- Jean Morrison Becker
- Robert Motherwell
- Seong Moy
- Lee Mullican
- Louise Nevelson
- Hubert Norton
- Lillian Orloff
- George Ortman
- Vevean Oviette
- Harold Paris
- Robert Andrew Parker
- Joellen Peet
- Irene Rice Pereira
- Gabor Peterdi
- Dimitri Petrov
- Helen Phillips
- Ron Pierson
- Daniel Philip Platt
- Jackson Pollock
- Josef Presser
- Lucia Quintero
- Andre Racz
- Abraham Rattner
- Henry Regis
- Jean-Paul Riopelle
- Kurt Roesch
- Louis Ross
- Mark Rothko
- David Ruff
- Alfred Russell
- Anne Ryan
- Louis Schanker
- Karl Schrag
- Bess Schuyler
- Kenneth Scott
- Doris Seidler
- Evangeline St. Claire
- Rufino Tamayo
- Yves Tanguy
- Ruthven Todd
- Mollie Tureske
- Sybilla Mittell Weber
- Anne Wienholt
- Pennerton West
- Jonathan Williams
- Larry Winston
- Madeleine Wormser
- Ana Rosa de Ycaza
- Enrique Zañartu

== Legacy ==
Atelier 17 and artists associated with it have been the subject of several comprehensive exhibitions, notably Atelier 17: a 50th anniversary retrospective exhibition at the Elvehjem Art Center of the University of Wisconsin in 1977, Atelier 17 at the Brooklyn Museum in 1978, Workshop and Legacy: Stanley William Hayter, Krishna Reddy, Zarina Hashmi at the Metropolitan Museum of Art in 2016, and Cutting Edge: Modern Prints from Atelier 17 at the Cleveland Museum of Art.
