= Karl Schrag =

American artist

- Karl Schrag Self Portrait, 1963
- Born: December 7, 1912; Karlsruhe, Germany
- Died: December 10, 1995 (aged 83); New York, New York
- Known for: Artist, Educator
- Spouse: Ilse Szamatolski

Karl Schrag (December 7, 1912 – December 10, 1995) was an American printmaker and educator. He has been characterized by the National Gallery of Art as "among the most important printmakers in America during the 1950s".

== Biography ==
Schrag was born in Karlsruhe, Germany on December 7, 1912. He attended Humanistisches Gymnasium in Karlsruhe and the École des Beaux-Arts in Geneva, Switzerland. From 1933 through 1938 he lived in Europe; first in Paris, where he attended the Académie Ranson, then moving to Brussels where he had a solo exhibition at Galeries Arenberg.

In 1938 he moved to New York. There he studied printmaking at the Art Students League of New York, then at Atelier 17 where he was taught by Stanley William Hayter and his fellow students included Marc Chagall, Joan Miró, and Jackson Pollock. He became an American citizen in 1944. Schrag went on to work at Atelier 17 where he served for a time as director of etching.

From 1954 through 1968 Schrag taught at Brooklyn College and Cooper Union. He was married to Ilse Szamatolski.

Schrag had a solo show in 1947 at the Kraushaar Galleries and in 1960, a retrospective exhibit at the Brooklyn Museum, and another solo show at Farnsworth Art Museum in 1992. He died on December 10, 1995, in New York City.

His work is included in the collections of the Art Institute of Chicago, the Brooklyn Museum, the Metropolitan Museum of Art, the Museum of Modern Art, the National Gallery of Art, the Smithsonian American Art Museum.
