= Ruth Leaf =

American artist

- Born: January 7, 1923; New York, New York
- Died: April 17, 2015 (aged 92); Venice, California
- Known for: Printmaking
- Website: ruthleafprints.com

Ruth Leaf (January 5, 1923 – April 17, 2015) was an American artist and a pioneer in the discipline of printmaking, specifically etching. She studied at the New School for Social Research, Art Students League of New York and Brooklyn College, and Atelier 17. While fluent in the methods of woodcut, linoleum, monotype, collagraph and collage, she is most known for her viscosity etchings. Born in New York City, she spent many years teaching in Long Island before moving to Venice, California where she lived until her death in 2015.

Leaf had a long and prolific career; teaching and exhibiting work until her late eighties and producing work up until her death. Her work is included in the collections of The Library of Congress, New York University, Columbia University, Ohio's Butler Institute of American Art and Connecticut's Slater Museum. She authored the book Intaglio Printmaking Techniques (Watson-Guptil Publications) in 1976 while teaching at her namesake studio in Long Island, and it remains the textbook used today in many schools.
