= Carmen Gracia =

Argentine artist-printmaker

Carmen Gracia RE
- Born: 1935 (age 90–91); Eugenio Bustos, Mendoza, Argentina
- Education: Mendoza College of Fine Art
- Known for: Artist, printmaker
- Website: Carmen Gracia

Carmen Gracia RE (born 1935) is an Argentine artist-printmaker.

Gracia left Argentina for Paris in 1960 and joined the printmaking studio Atelier 17, run by William Hayter. She later studied at the Slade School of Fine Art.

Examples of Gracia's work are included in the British Council art collection, the UK Government Art Collection, the Victoria and Albert Museum the Calouste Gulbenkian Museum, the Cuming Museum, the Indianapolis Museum of Art and the Chazen Museum of Art.

== Writing ==
- The Painter Joaquín Sorolla y Bastida (San Diego Museum of Art, 1989), essays by Francisco Pons Sorolla, Carmen Gracia, and Priscilla Muller
