= Viscosity (disambiguation) =

Viscosity is the resistance of a fluid to shear deformation.

Viscosity may also refer to:

- Viscosity (cognitive dimension), an interface design principle
- Viscosity printing, a printmaking technique
