= Armin Landeck =

American artist

- Born: June 4, 1905; Crandon, Wisconsin
- Died: December 1, 1984 (aged 79); Litchfield, Connecticut
- Known for: Printmaking
- Website: arminlandeck.com

Armin Landeck (1905–1984) was an American printmaker and educator.

== Biography ==
Landeck was born on June 4, 1905, in Crandon, Wisconsin. He studied at the University of Michigan and then Columbia University, graduating in 1927. After he graduated he traveled for over a year in Europe, returning to New York and Connecticut. He began creating prints using a variety of techniques including aquatint, drypoint, etching, and lithography. In 1934 he and fellow artist Martin Lewis started the School for Printmakers, where they taught printmaking. The school closed in 1935 and Landeck went on to work with Stanley William Hayter at Atelier 17. In 1953 Landeck received a Guggenheim Fellowship.

Landeck taught at the Brearley School in New York City from 1931 until 1958. He then retired to his farm in Litchfield, Connecticut. He died on December 1, 1984.

Landeck's work is included in the collections of the Art Institute of Chicago, the Metropolitan Museum of Art, the Museum of Modern Art, the National Gallery of Art, and the Pennsylvania Academy of the Fine Arts, and the Smithsonian American Art Museum.
