= Kaiko Moti =

Visual artist (1921–1989)

Kaiko Moti (1921–1989) was a Franco-Indian painter and printmaker. He was born in 1921 in Bombay, India, and studied at the Bombay School of Fine Arts. In 1946, he moved to London, England to study at the Slade School of Art at University College. In 1950, he relocated to Paris and worked with printmaker Stanley William Hayter in the Atelier 17 artist group, and developed Viscosity Printing Techniques. A work from this period is included in the British Museum collection. Moving to the University of Wisconsin, he worked with Dean Meeker and taught his printmaking techniques to Japanese artist Hitoshi Nakazato.

== Collections ==
Moti's work is held in the permanent collection of the British Museum, the Victoria and Albert Museum, the Musée d’Art Moderne de Paris, among other venues.
