= Dolf Rieser =

South African artist (1893–1983)

- Born: 1898; King William's Town, Cape Colony
- Died: 1983 (aged 84–85)
- Occupations: Painter, printmaker, and teacher

Dolf Rieser (1898–1983) was a South African painter, printmaker, and teacher. He illustrated the 1952 edition of Two Tales of the Congo by Joseph Conrad with eight copper engravings. He was the author of Art and Science published in 1972.

== Early life and education ==
Dolf Rieser was born in King William's Town, Cape Colony, and educated in Germany and Switzerland. In 1917, he studied at the École Polytechnique, Zürich, obtaining a diploma in agricultural engineering, then from 1918 to 1922 obtained a doctorate in biological science at the University of Lausanne. In 1923, he researched science at the Ludwig-Maximilians-Universität München, while studying art with Hans Hoffman.

Rieser studied at the Atelier 17 in Paris with British surrealist painter and printmaker Stanley William Hayter (1901–88) and Polish engraver Józef Hecht (1891–1951). In 1926, Hayter had settled in Paris, where he enrolled in the Académie Julian and studied burin engraving privately with Hecht, who also taught Anthony Gross.

== Career ==
Rieser joined Hayter in 1928 after he began to take his own pupils and worked through 1940 at Atelier 17 (named in 1933, after the street number of Hayter's studio in the Rue Campagne-Première). The signature of the workshop was its democratic structure, breaking with the traditional hierarchic French engraving studios by insisting on a cooperative approach to labour and technical discoveries.

In 1929, Hayter was introduced to Surrealism by Yves Tanguy and André Masson, together with other Surrealists (including Picasso, Miró, Arp, Tanguy, Giacometti, Ernst, Trevelyan, Peterdi and Rieser), associated with Atelier 17.

Reiser organized portfolios of prints to raise funds for the Spanish cause, (including Solidarité (Paris, 1938), a portfolio of seven prints, one of them by Picasso), and Kandinsky contributed to the Stephen Spender and Atelier 17 album "Fraternité" to raise money for children orphaned by the Spanish Civil War. Spender's poem was both in English and with a French translation by Louis Aragon, was accompanied by a group of etchings by Kandinsky, Miro, Hayter, Hecht, Buckland-Wright, Husband, Mead, Rieser and Varas.

He moved to England to join the war effort in 1940, and in 1945, newly married, he settled back to civilian life, lecturing in biology, liberal studies and art, while also giving private lessons in printmaking.

In 1960, he was invited to Cape Town and Johannesburg Universities to lecture on that subject.

During the 1960s, Rieser pioneered printing on translucent fibre-glass panels and laminates. He also worked on a range of applied prints on scarves for Liberty. A member of the Royal Society of Painter-Etchers, he introduced colour intaglio to post-war Britain.

He took part in group shows widely throughout Europe and America, including Peggy Guggenheim's Gallery, 1939; Atelier 17 in New York City and San Francisco, 1954. His solo shows were international, including Galerie Bonjean, Paris, 1936; Zwemmer Gallery, 1956; ICA 1966, Lumley Cazalet, 1968; and David Paul Gallery, Chichester 1979. The Victoria and Albert Museum, the Imperial War Museum, the Arts Council UK, the National Gallery of Canada and the New York Public Library hold his work.

== Critical reception ==
A 1973 review of Art and Science in British Journal of Psychiatry found Rieser's book "small and well-illustrated" and "interesting but not penetrating".
