= Kilstrom =

Kilstrom or Kilström is a surname. Notable people with the surname include:

- Kenneth Kilstrom (1922–1995), American painter and printmaker
- Lukas Kilström (born 1990), Swedish ice hockey player
