= Rathsman =

Rathsman is a surname. Notable people with the surname include:

- Jonas Rathsman, Swedish music producer and graphic designer
- Otto Rathsman (1917–1986), Swedish diplomat
- Siri Rathsman (1895–1974), Swedish artist and journalist
