= Pennerton West =

- Born: April 11, 1913; New York, New York
- Died: June 29, 1965 (aged 52); Shrub Oak, New York
- Known for: Printmaking
- Spouse: John Herma

Pennerton West (April 11, 1913 – June 29, 1965) was an American artist best known for her prints.

== Biography ==
West was born on April 11, 1913, in New York City. West was descended from the American historical landscape painter Benjamin West. She was married to John Herma.

She studied at the Art Student's League and Cooper Union in New York City. She also studied with artists Hans Hoffman, Stanley William Hayter and Ibram Lassaw.

She was affiliated with Atelier 17 in Paris, an avant-garde workshop founded by Hayter in 1927.

West died on June 29, 1965 in Shrub Oak, New York.

== Selected works ==
- Vase of Flowers (1945/1965)
- On Such a Night (1946)
- Standing Female Nude (n.d.)
- Untitled (n.d.)
- Woman Crouching (n.d.)

== Selected exhibitions ==
=== Group exhibitions ===
- Atelier 17, Grace Borgenicht Gallery, New York, NY, September 24-October 14, 1951
- Nine Women Painters, Bennington College Gallery, Bennington, VT, March 20-April 2, 1953

=== Solo exhibitions ===
- Norlyst Gallery, New York, NY, October 1947
- De Nagy Gallery, New York, NY, September 1951
- De Nagy Gallery, New York, NY, January 1953
- Condon Riley Gallery, New York, NY, November 1958
- Willard-Lucien Gallery, New York, NY, April 19-May 7, 1960
