= Thomas Brownell Eldred =

American Abstract expressionist painter and printmaker

- Born: February 19, 1903; Climax, Michigan
- Died: May 21, 1993 (aged 90); Polk, Pennsylvania
- Known for: Artist, Educator
- Movement: Abstract expressionism

Thomas Brownell Eldred (1903–1993) was an American Abstract expressionist painter and printmaker.

== Biography ==
Eldred was born on February 19, 1903, in Climax, Michigan. He served for a time with the Merchant Marines. He attended the Kalamazoo College, the School of the Art Institute of Chicago, the Art Students League of New York, and Atelier 17. His teachers included Guy Pène du Bois, Thomas Hart Benton, Stanley William Hayter, Louis Ritman, and John Vanderpoel., Eldred was strongly influenced by Werner Drewes.

Eldred taught printmaking at the Brooklyn Museum Art School from 1933 through 1938 under the auspices of the Works Progress Administration.

Eldred exhibited at the Art Institute of Chicago, the Brooklyn Museum, the Detroit Institute of Arts, The New School, and the Virginia Museum of Fine Arts. His work is in the collections of the Brooklyn Museum, the Guggenheim, and the National Gallery of Art,

Eldred died on May 21, 1993, in Polk, Pennsylvania.
