= Roderick Fletcher Mead =

American artist (b. 1900, d. 1971)

Roderick Mead
- Born: Roderick Fletcher Mead; June 25, 1900; South Orange, New Jersey, U.S.
- Died: May 5, 1971; Carlsbad, New Mexico, U.S.
- Education: Yale University, Art Students League of New York, Grand Central School of Art
- Known for: Painting, Engraving

Roderick Fletcher Mead (1900–1971) was an American artist. Mead was best known for his engravings, but his work encompassed a number of media including oil paintings, prints, etchings, woodcut and also watercolors. He is represented in the collections of the Metropolitan Museum of Art, Carnegie Institute, and the Victoria and Albert Museum, among others.

Born in South Orange, New Jersey in 1900 on his family's estate known as Springlawn, to businessman Winthrop Lincoln Mead, and grandson of Edwin Henry Mead, president of the Pennsylvania Coal Company. He attended Newark Academy, where he received instruction in art among other subjects, and graduated from Yale University in 1925 with a degree in fine arts. Having moved to New York City after college, Mead took instruction at the Art Students League of New York, including classes and later private instruction with painter George Luks. He also studied watercolor painting under George Pearse Ennis in the late 1920s at the Grand Central School of Art.

In the 1930s, Mead worked under printmaker Stanley William Hayter in Paris at Atelier 17, and was exposed to surrealism and abstraction in the work of artists such as Joan Miró, Pablo Picasso, and Yves Tanguy.

After the outbreak of World War II, Mead returned to the US and relocated to Carlsbad, New Mexico in the 1940s, where he took inspiration from the animals and plants of the surrounding high desert environment. He had a brief stint as an engraver for the Potash Company of America there in the 1950s.

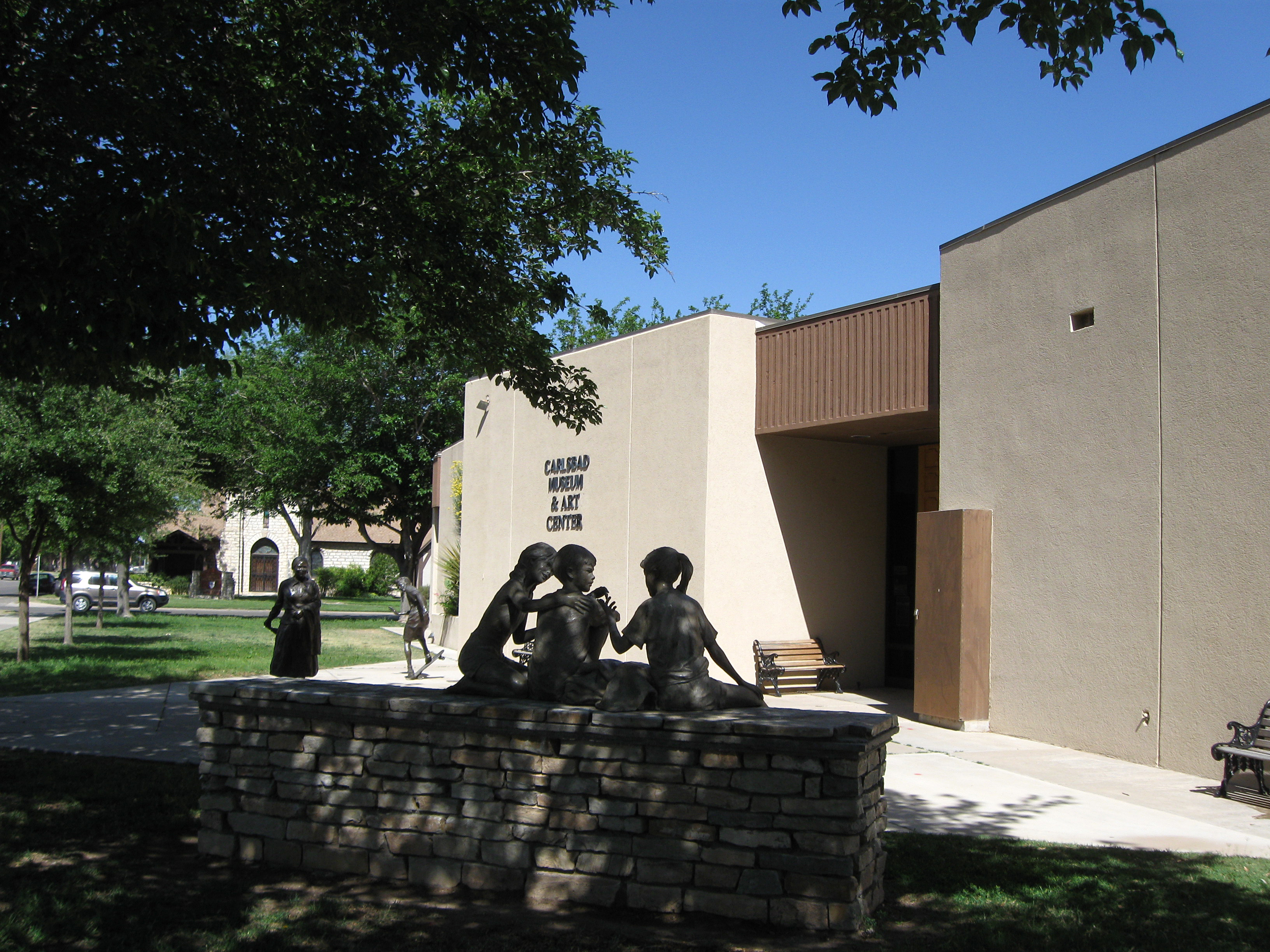
The Carlsbad New Mexico Museum & Art Center, which houses a significant collection of Mead's work

In 2016, the Carlsbad, New Mexico Museum & Art Center created a small gallery dedicated to his work, with over 30 pieces on display.

Mead died on May 5, 1971, at his home in New Mexico.

== List of major works ==
- (1951) The Wooden Horse Brooklyn Museum
- (1954) Horned Animals Museum of Modern Art

== One-Man Shows ==
- California Palace of the Legion of Honor
- Museum of the University of New Mexico
- Columbus Gallery of Fine Arts
- Louisville Art Center
