= Salvatore Grippi =

American artist

- Born: September 30, 1921; Buffalo, New York
- Died: November 30, 2017 (aged 96); Brewster, Massachusetts
- Known for: painting, printmaking

Salvatore Grippi (1921-2017) was an American artist and founder of the art department at Ithaca College.

== Biography ==
Grippi was born in Buffalo, New York, on September 30, 1921. He attended the Albright Art School and the Museum of Modern Art School. He served in the armed forces during World War II. Upon his return he studied at the Art Students League of New York and the Atelier 17 print studio. He was the recipient of a Fulbright scholarship which he used to study at the Istituto Statale d’Arte in Florence.

Grippi taught at several art schools including the Cooper Union Art School, the School of Visual Arts, and Pomona College. He founded the art department at Ithaca College.

He died on November 30, 2017, in Brewster, Massachusetts.

Grippi's work is included in the collections of the Museum of Modern Art, the National Gallery of Art, and the Whitney Museum of American Art.
