= Norma Morgan =

American printmaker and painter (born 1928)

- Born: 1928; New Haven, Connecticut
- Died: 2017 (aged 88–89)
- Education: Hans Hofmann School, Art Students League
- Known for: Painting and printmaking

Norma Morgan (1928–2017) was an American printmaker and painter. Her work is found in major collections worldwide and she has been highly recognized for her etchings and engravings, many of which were inspired by time spent in Great Britain.

== Early life and education ==
Norma Gloria Morgan was born in New Haven, Connecticut, in 1928. She is African-American. Her mother raised her, after the early death of her father, and worked as a domestic worker, a seamstress, and designer. Morgan showed interest in art from childhood, painting a classroom wall mural at the age of thirteen and receiving recognition for her painting, Reflections, completed when she was seventeen. Following high school, she studied at the Whitney School of Art in New Haven, Connecticut two years at the Art Students League of New York, privately with Hans Hofmann in her early 20s, and later with Stanley Hayter. It was Hayter who taught her engraving.

== Career and life ==
Morgan received a fellowship to study in England in her twenties and spent much of her time exploring the Moors. This time inspired work that centered on natural imagery, especially skies and clouds. She went back to Great Britain in 1961 and stayed there until 1966. Her work was selected to represent the United States in the First World Festival of Negro Arts, held in Dakar, Senegal, in April 1966. The other American artists included in this exhibition included Barbara Chase-Riboud (at that time known as Barbara Chase), Emilio Cruz, Sam Gilliam, Richard Hunt, Jacob Lawrence, and Charles White.

She has won a distinguished list of awards for her work, including but not limited to the John Hay Whitney Fellowship; first prize at the Philadelphia Museum in 1955; Gold Medal, Graphics Award, National Academy of Arts & Letters; the Louis Comfort Tiffany Grant; three gold medals from the American Artists Professional League, and the gold medal from Audubon Artists. Her work is in the collection of the Academy Art Museum in Easton, Maryland.

Morgan spent her active years living in both New York City, where she worked primarily on engravings in her apartment, and Woodstock, New York, where she had space for large painting. She has a love of the outdoors and activities such as cross-country skiing and lake swimming. She also played mandolin, meeting with other musicians to play in Washington Square Park.

In interviews, Morgan has explained that her motivations for her artwork go "beyond" the black experience and feminist identity. Her works span Realism and Surrealism and fantasy, and feature figurative works of family members, landscape and vistas.
