= Frederick G. Becker =

American artist (1913–2004)

- Born: August 5, 1913; Oakland, California
- Died: June 30, 2004 (aged 90); Amherst, Massachusetts
- Known for: printmaking

Frederick Gerhard Becker (1913–2004) was an American printmaker and educator.

== Biography ==
Becker was born on August 5, 1913, in Oakland, California. Becker was born to a silent film actor, and was raised in Hollywood. In 1933 he moved to New York City where he briefly studied architecture at New York University. He abandoned architecture to become a printmaker. In 1935 he joined the Graphic Arts Division of the Works Project Administration and then became involved with the Atelier 17 printmaking studio in the 1940s before he was drafted into World War II. He was also a member of the Society of American Graphic Artists.

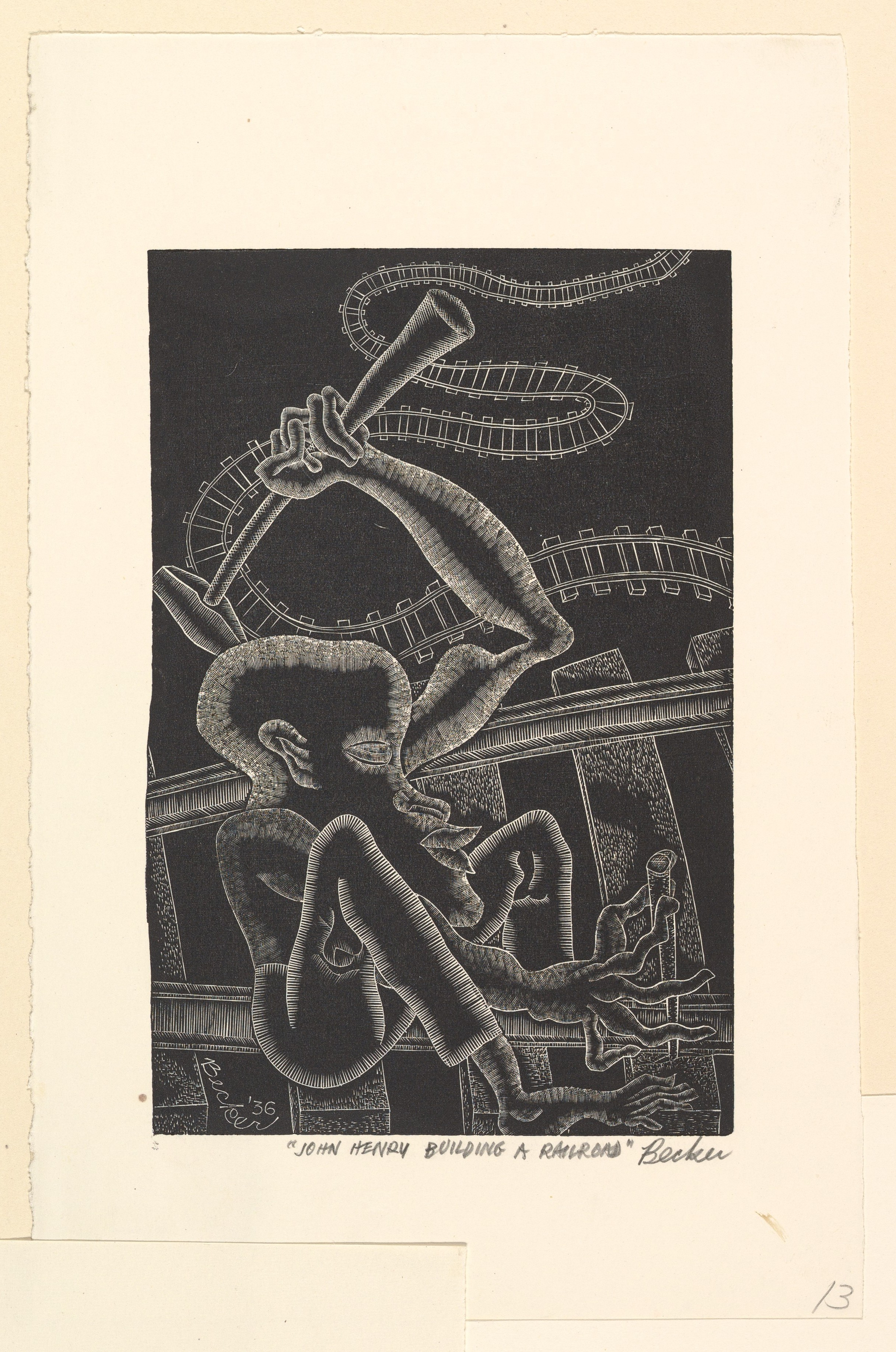
John Henry wood engraving by Becker, 1936

Becker began his teaching career after his return from the war. He first taught at the Tyler School of Art in Philadelphia. He then taught Washington University in St. Louis where he created the printmaking department (now a part of the Sam Fox School of Design & Visual Arts) . He went on to teach at the University of Massachusetts Amherst. Becker was the recipient of a Tiffany Foundation fellowship and a Yaddo fellowship. In 1957 he was the recipient of a Guggenheim fellowship.

Becker died on June 30, 2004, in Amherst, Massachusetts.

Becker's work is included in the collections of the Art Institute of Chicago, the Museum of Modern Art, the National Gallery of Art, the Smithsonian American Art Museum, and the Whitney Museum of American Art.
