= Dalla Husband =

Canadian artist

- Born: March 3, 1899; Winnipeg, Manitoba, Canada
- Died: August 15, 1943 (aged 44); Mexico City, Mexico
- Resting place: Panteón Jardín
- Education: Stanley William Hayter
- Known for: printmaker, painter
- Style: surrealism
- Partner: Stanley William Hayter

Gladys Dalla Husband (March 3, 1899 – August 15, 1943) was a Canadian artist who was active in Paris and Mexico.

== Early life ==
The daughter of Major Herbert Husband, she was born in Winnipeg and grew up on the family ranch in Vernon. The family moved to England in 1903 but returned to Canada in 1907, settling in Banff. She studied art with British ex-pat artist Jessie Topham Brown, who was based in British Columbia.

== Career ==
After she received an inheritance from her grandmother, she traveled to London and then Paris where she pursued further studies in art. She exhibited at the Salon des Surindépendants there in 1929. While in Paris, she studied engraving with Józef Hecht. Her work was also shown at galleries in Paris, London and in Canada.

Husband and her friend Alice Carr du Croft convinced Stanley William Hayter to teach them how to make prints. This was the start of Atelier 17. Around 1930, Husband and Hayter also began an affair that lasted until 1938. Husband as Hayter's partner is obliquely mentioned in Indigo Days by Julian Trevelyan.

She worked with Hayter on two projects: Solidarité, published in 1936, and Fraternité, published in 1939 by Gonzalo More, Paris. Other artists participating in these projects included Pablo Picasso, Joan Miró, Wassily Kandinsky, André Masson and Yves Tanguy. Funds raised by these projects supported the Spanish resistance and Spanish orphans and widows.

Husband collaborated with Afro-American poet Langston Hughes and provided nine etchings for his poem Madrid, written in 1937. Hughes' long poem was his reaction to an assignment to write about black Americans volunteering in the Spanish Civil War. Husband’s images, influenced by her commitment to the Republican cause, include mothers grieving for their children and one depicting two soldiers of the International Brigade. The hardcover book Madrid 1937 was published in 1939, printed by Gonzalo More, Paris, in an edition of 50. One example of the book, Madrid 37, signed in pencil and annotated as II [Roman numeral two] has appeared on the rare book market.

Husband returned to Canada at the start of World War II.

== Mexico ==
In May 1940, she left for Mexico where a group of Canadian and other artists were working. She died in Mexico City at the age of 44, of blood poisoning after undergoing ear surgery. Her Mexican death certificate dated August 16, 1943 states that Dalla Husband, listed as a painter, died from postoperative cardiac failure ("Insuficiencia Cardiaca Postoperativia") at the Cowdray Hospital, the American British Cowdray Medical Centre. According to the certificate, she is buried in Mexico City at the Panteón Jardín along with many distinguished figures from Mexican music, art and cinema.

== Collections ==
Two of her etchings along with Trevelyan's gallery brochure, The Circulating Library of Pictures, containing her name as a contributor, are found in Trevelyan's scrapbook, datable 1938-1940, in the Tate Museum archives.

The Langston Hughes papers in the collection of Yale University Archives contains a short letter to Hughes from Husband in reference to the engravings she made for his poem Madrid. This undated letter was sent to Hughes from an address in the historic centre of Mexico City and includes one engraving.

In 1989, the Winnipeg Art Gallery acquired a substantial collection of Husband's art: significant oil paintings (Machinist; Dream Landscape; Bird; Man, Horse and Cart) and several etchings.

== Bibliography ==
In 2015, Burnaby Art Gallery of University of British Columbia mounted an exhibition curated by Eva Tweedie: Gravure Automatique: Dalla Husband at Atelier 17.

The Annex Galleries, Santa Rosa, California, maintain a biography of Husband on their website.

Silvano Levy has presented the Husband story and analyzed key works in a 2021 article in Art Herstory.

Christina Weyl. The Women of Atelier 17: Modernist Printmaking in Midcentury New York. (New Haven: Yale University Press) 2019.
