= Kenneth Kilstrom =

American painter and printmaker

- Born: December 25, 1922; Chicago, Illinois
- Died: May 11, 1995 (aged 72); New York, New York
- Known for: Painting, printmaking

Harold Kenneth Russel Kilstrom (December 25, 1922 – May 11, 1995) was an American painter and printmaker, associated in the 1940s–1970s, with Abstract Expressionism. He was primarily known as Kenneth Kilstrom. He was an apprentice of Isamu Noguchi and a member of Stanley Hayter's Atelier 17. While working with Hayter in New York in 1948, he became the first artist known to have used the direct transfer of "real world" photographic imagery on to an intaglio printing plate as an element in a composition in his work "Attack on Marshall Gilbert". Kilstrom produced fifteen of these prints, two of which are held by the National Archives and the Fogg Museum at Harvard University.

== Career ==
Kilstrom was born in Chicago, Illinois, on December 25, 1922. He was an only child, the son of optometrist Harold Robert and Hulda Nelson Kilstrom. Kilstrom attended J. Sterling Morton High School in Cicero, Illinois, where he was a member of the National Honor Society. He attended the University of Illinois (1942–1943) and the School of the Art Institute of Chicago (1943–1944). He was awarded a scholarship for art to the Cooper Union in 1945, where he attended briefly, before accepting an apprenticeship with Isamu Noguchi (1945–1947). Kilstrom worked mainly as a printmaker in the 1940s and early 1950s, exhibiting in Chicago, Philadelphia and New York City. He became a friend of artist Milton Resnick and his partner, artist Pat Passlof, who helped Kilstrom with his career. Kilstrom was committed to a psychiatric institution for much of the 1950s and early 1960s but was released, based on the success of a nearly sold-out showing of his work at the Tanager Gallery in New York in 1961, with the assistance of Resnick and Pasloff. Kilstrom focused primarily on painting after that time. His work is in the collections of the National Gallery of Art and the Museum of Modern Art.

== Personal life ==
Kilstrom was married to Joy Soeda, born on July 2, 1915, in Hawaii and died November 16, 1988, in New York. She was the daughter of Japanese immigrants, and a school teacher. She was confined to the Manzanar relocation camp during World War II. The Kilstroms did not have children. Kenneth Kilstrom's estate was sold at auction in New York City in 1995.

Kilstrom died in 1995 in New York City.

== Exhibitions ==
- Museum of Modern Art (MOMA), "76 Jefferson Streeters Show", 1975
- Roswell Museum and Art Center, Roswell, New Mexico, 1971
- Fishbach Gallery, New York City, 1964–1966
- Zabriske Gallery, New York City, 1963, 1964, 1966
- Tanager Gallery, New York City, 1961
- Renaissance Society at the University of Chicago, 1949
- Pennsylvania Academy of Fine Arts, 1948

== Public collections ==
- Hirshhorn Museum and Sculpture Garden, Washington, D.C.
- Indianapolis Museum of Art, Indianapolis, IN
- Amon Carter Museum of American Art, Ft. Worth, TX
- Museum of Art and Archaeology, University of Missouri, Columbia, MO
- Anderson Museum of Contemporary Art, Roswell, NM
- Roswell Museum and Art Center, Roswell, NM
- Fogg Museum, Harvard University, Cambridge, MA
- Museum of Contemporary Art, University of São Paulo, São Paulo, Brazil
- Brooklyn Museum, New York, NY
