= Vevean Oviette =

Austrian artist

- Born: Emma Schwarzbauer; 31 March 1902; Graz, Austria
- Died: 1986 (aged 83–84); Graz, died at home, Austria
- Known for: Printmaking

Vevean Oviette (1902-1986) was an Austrian artist known for her printmaking.

== Biography ==
Oviette was born on 31 March 1902 in Graz, Austria. In 1936 she moved to New York City where she studied at the Art Students League of New York and the Franklin School of Fine and Applied Arts, the New School for Social Research, and Atelier 17. She worked as a newspaper illustrator and a fashion illustrator.

In 1948 Oviette exhibited her work at the Argent Gallery. In 1949, 1950, 1952, and 1955 she participated in the Brooklyn Museum annual. She had solo show in 1954 at the Bertha Schaefer Gallery.

In the 1950s Oviette returned to Europe, first to Paris and then to Graz where she was part of the Secession Graz art movement.

Her work is in the collections of the National Gallery of Art and the Brooklyn Museum.

Oviette died at her home in Graz, Austria in November 1986. In 2007 the Neue Galerie Graz held a retrospective exhibition of her work. Her works, which she kept at her home ( Billrothgasse, Graz Leonhard), including 2 Fernand Leger originals and her last will were stolen from her studio apartment before she was found dead the following morning.
