= Seong Moy =

American painter

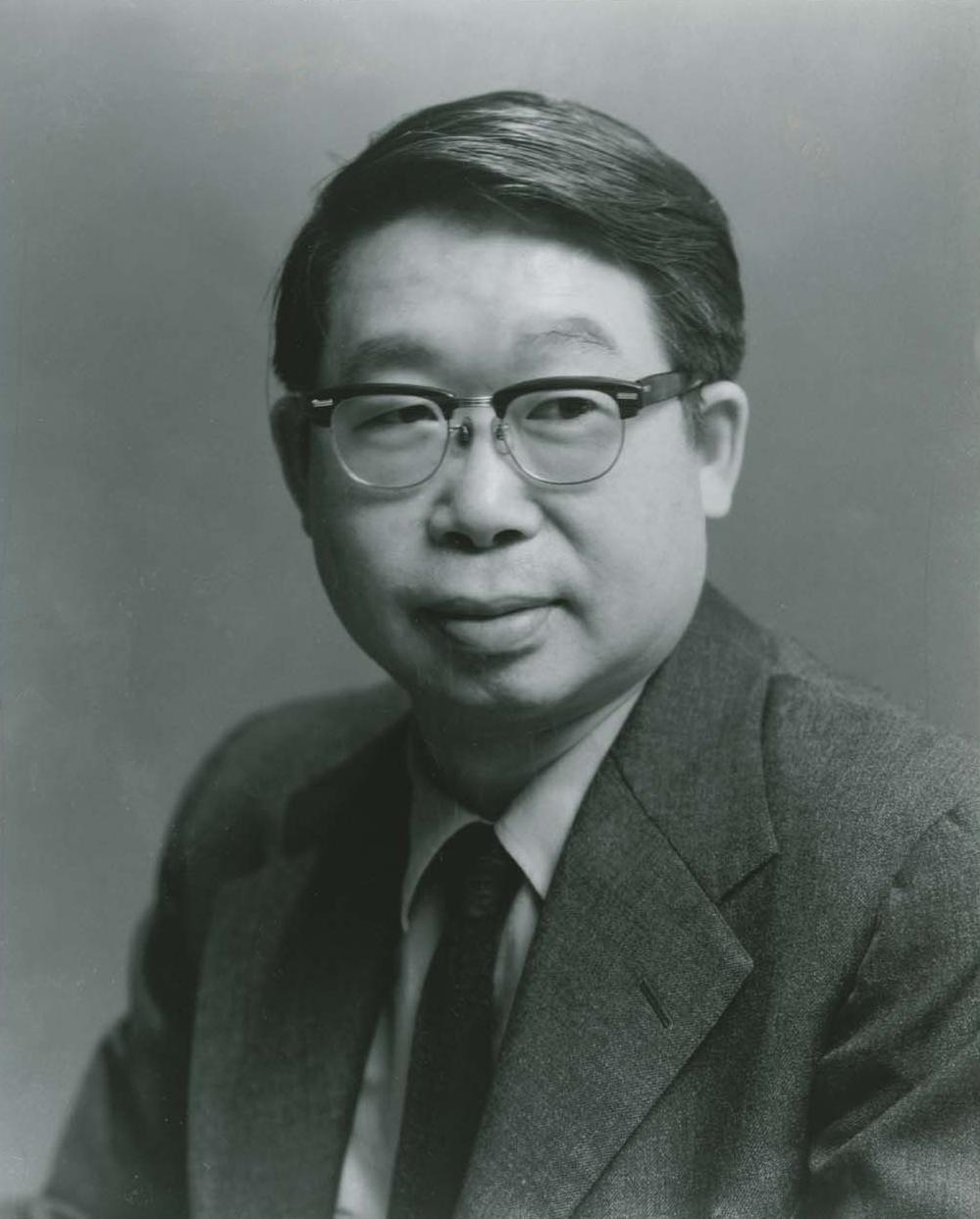
- Born: April 12, 1921 near Canton, China
- Died: June 9, 2013 (aged 92); New York City, New York, U.S.
- Education: Federal Art Project, St. Paul School of Art, Walker Art Center, Art Students League of New York, Hoffman School of Art, Atelier 17, Printmaking Workshop
- Known for: Printmaking
- Movement: Abstract expressionism
- Partner: Sui Yung

Seong Moy (Chinese: 梅祥; April 12, 1921 – June 9, 2013) was an American painter and printmaker.

Moy was born in a small town outside of Canton, China; he emigrated to the United States at the age of 10 in 1931, and joined other members of his family who had settled in St. Paul, Minnesota. During this time, Moy attended school during the day, and trained in his uncle's restaurant as an assistant chef when not in school. In 1934, Moy was introduced to art classes at the WPA Federal Art Project School through a friend. For the next few years, Moy studied art first at the Federal Art Project, and later at the St. Paul School of Art under Cameron Booth, and the WPA Graphic Workshop at the Walker Art Center in Minneapolis, MN. Advisors recognized his talent and permitted him to take more classes while maintaining a job.

In 1941 he moved to New York City where he was awarded a scholarship to study at the Art Students League of New York and the Hoffman School of Art. This lasted until the fall of 1942, when he enlisted with the United States Army Air Forces, serving in the China-India-Burma Theater as an aerial reconnaissance photographer with the 14th Air Force, the "Flying Tigers".

After the war Moy married and brought his wife Sui Yung to New York. He returned to the Art Students League on the G.I. Bill and re-established his relationship with Cameron Booth, who was now teaching in New York. Moy experimented with printmaking at the Atelier 17 and Robert Blackburn Printmaking Workshop in New York.

In the 1950s, Moy became a professor, teaching almost forty years at colleges, universities, and institutions:

- Cooper Union
- Pratt Graphic Arts Center
- Columbia University
- New York University
- Smith College
- Vassar College
- Provincetown, Massachusetts

In 1955 Moy won a Guggenheim Fellowship. His woodcuts from this time are notable in their use of subject matter from Chinese classics, combined with the formal techniques of Abstract Expressionism. For example, his woodcut Inscription of T'Chao Pae #II (1952) explores the potential of archaic Chinese calligraphy, illustrating the artist's aim, in his own words, to "recreate in the abstract idiom of contemporary time some of the ideas of ancient Chinese art forms."

He returned to China at the age of 85, in 2008, with his wife, daughters and grandchildren to the rural villages where he and his wife were born in the 1920s. He had a great effect on his family and many who knew him in his life. Moy died in New York on June 9, 2013. He was survived by his wife of sixty six years, Sui Yung, his daughters, Jacqueline and Adrienne, and two grandchildren, Eamon and Fiona.

His work can be found in the permanent collections of a number of museums in the United States, including the Brooklyn Museum, Metropolitan Museum of Art, Museum of Modern Art, Whitney Museum of American Art, Indianapolis Museum of Art, Vero Beach Museum of Art, University of Michigan Museum of Art, Philadelphia Museum of Art, Smithsonian American Art Museum, and National Gallery of Art in Washington, DC.

== Fellowships ==
In 1941, Moy attended to the Art Students League in New York by earning a scholarship. He studied painting and printmaking under Vaclav Vytlacil and Will Barnet. He also won another scholarship to the Hans Hofmann School of Art.

In 1948, Moy was awarded a fellowship to study printmaking at Stanley William Hayter's legendary Atelier 17 graphic arts studio which is in New York. Although it was the ideal environment for Moy, he needed a studio for printmaking. Moy described Atelier 17 as

“an exchange of points of view, exchange of ideas, what one is trying to do and searching for some newness in technical innovations to fit in with a situation.”

In 1950: Moy received a Whitney Fellowship, the biggest award of his career. Consequently, he was suggested to visit artist position at the University of Minnesota, which is the place that he began to teach. Moy went on to teach at the University of Indiana, Smith, Vassar, and Columbia.

In 1955, Moy won a Guggenheim Fellowship. His woodcuts from this time are notable in their use of subject matter from Chinese classics, combined with the formal techniques of Abstract Expressionism. For example, his woodcut Inscription of T'Chao Pae #II (1952) explores the potential of archaic Chinese calligraphy, illustrating the artist's aim, in his own words, to "recreate in the abstract idiom of contemporary time some of the ideas of ancient Chinese art forms."

Between 1970 and 1989, Moy served as Professor of Art at City College of New York, and as an instructor at the Art Students League teaching for more than twenty years.

== Selected works ==
Some of Moy's works can be seen at Wikiart.org.

- BLACK SHORE DUNES ca. 1955-1965 brush and ink and ink wash on paper
- EAST GATES n.d. etching on paper
- PORTHOLE n.d. etching on paper
- NUDE #1 1967 pen and ink and ink wash on paper
- FLOATING ISLAND n.d. color woodcut on paper
- THE BLACK GATES n.d. etching on paper
- THE ROYAL FAMILY 1952 color woodcut on paper
- THE YELLOW CHAMBER n.d. color woodcut on paper
- INSCRIPTION OF JO PUA 1958 color woodcut on paper
- URGULL #2 n.d. color woodcut on paper
- YEN SHENG 1952 color woodcut on paper
- SAND PIPERS ca. 1960 color woodcut on paper
- CAPE COD LANDSCAPE ca. 1955-1965 brush and ink and ink wash on paper
- THE WANTON ALCHEMIST #1 1951 color woodcut on paper
- KUANG KUNG 1952 color woodcut on paper
- SPRING SONG 1955 brush and ink and ink wash on paper
- CAPE POINT n.d. color lithograph on paper
- BLACK STONE AND RED PEBBLE ca. 1970s color woodcut on paper
- LITTLE ACT ON HORSEBACK 1949 color woodcut on paper
- TIMELESS IMPRINTS 1961 color woodcut on paper
- NASSAU COUNTY #1 1961 color woodcut on paper
- NUDE #2 1967 pen and ink and ink wash on paper
- TWO FIGURES 1966 pen and ink and ink wash on paper
- NASSAU COUNTY #2 n.d. color woodcut on paper
- ROCK GARDEN 1962 color woodcut on paper
- THE COCK FIGHT 1955 ink wash on paper
- NETS ca. 1955-1965 ink wash, brush and ink and pastel on paper
- VIS-A-VIS 1962 color woodcut on paper
- THE COURT OF SILENCES #1 n.d. color woodcut on paper
- THE COURT OF SILENCE n.d. color woodcut on paper
- WINTER'S PATH 1965 color woodcut on paper
- LILY POND 1960 ink wash and pencil on paper
- COURT OF SILENCE #2 n.d. color woodcut on paper
- DANCER IN MOTION 1952 color woodcut on paper
- MOTHER AND CHILD 1963 color woodcut on paper
- NIGHT GLOW n.d. color etching on paper
