= Worden Day =

American painter

- Worden Day in her studio, ca. 1959
- Born: June 11, 1912; Columbus, Ohio
- Died: January 27, 1986 (aged 73); Montclair, New Jersey
- Known for: Printmaking
- Awards: Guggenheim Fellow (1952), (1961)

Worden Day (1912–1986) was an American painter, printmaker, and sculptor. Day was the recipient of a Guggenheim Fellowship in both 1952 and 1961.

== Life ==
Day was born in Columbus, Ohio, and graduated from Randolph-Macon College in 1934. After moving to New York she studied at the Art Students League of New York and the New School of Social Research, and worked at Atelier 17 in 1943. She also ran a print shop for reading books for the New York City Board of Education.

She taught at the University of Wyoming, from 1949 to 1952, graduated from New York University with a M.A. in 1966, and returned to the Art Students League as an instructor from 1966 through 1970.

Day was a MacDowell fellow throughout her life in 1940, 1955, 1956, 1958, 1963, and 1981.

Day died January 27, 1986, of cancer.

The Smithsonian Archives of American Art holds 4.5 linear feet of archival materials from Day's life, of which, a small selection is available online. Day's work is held by the National Gallery of Art, the Museum of Modern Art, the Metropolitan Museum of Art, the Whitney Museum of American Art, and the Smithsonian American Art Museum.
