= Theodore Brenson =

American artist

- Born: 1893; Riga, Latvia
- Died: September 21, 1959 (aged 71); Peterborough, New Hampshire
- Known for: printmaking, illustration

Theodore Brenson (1893–1959) was a Latvian-American abstract artist and educator.

== Biography ==
Brenson was born in Riga, Latvia in 1893. He attended the Art School of the City of Riga, the Imperial Academy of Beaux-Arts in St. Petersburg, Russia, University of Moscow, and the University of Riga.

Brenson emigrated to the United States where he taught at the College of Wooster in Wooster, Ohio, the Cummington School of the Arts in Cummington, Massachusetts, Manhattan College, and Douglass College where he was chair of the Art Department.

In april 1935, he exhibited at the Petit Palais (Paris) with the Société des peintres-graveurs indépendants.

In 1957 he received the Prix de la Critique in Paris, becoming the first American abstract artist to receive that honor. He was also associated with the Atelier 17 printmaking studio.

Brenson died of a heart attack on September 21, 1959, while working at the MacDowell Colony in Peterborough, New Hampshire.

Brenson's work is included in the collections of the Brooklyn Museum, the Detroit Institute of Arts, the National Gallery of Art, and the Whitney Museum of American Art. His papers are in the Archives of American Art at the Smithsonian Institution.
