= Leon Karp =

American artist

- Born: 1903; Brooklyn, New York
- Died: 1951 (aged 47–48); New York, New York
- Known for: painting, printmaking

Leon Karp (1903–1951) was an American artist.

== Biography ==
Karp was born in Brooklyn, New York in 1903. He attended the Pennsylvania Museum School of Industrial Art and the Pennsylvania Academy of the Fine Arts. He was also associated with the Atelier 17 printmaking studio. Karp died on August 3, 1951, in New York at the age of 47.

Karp's work is included in the collections of the Metropolitan Museum of Art, the Museum of Modern Art, the National Gallery of Art, and the Smithsonian American Art Museum.
