= Nina Negri =

Argentine-French painter and engraver

- Born: 24 December 1901; Rosario, Santa Fe, Argentina
- Died: 29 May 1981 (aged 79); Paris, France
- Movement: Surrealism
- Spouse: Claude Popelin

Nina Negri (24 December 1901 – 29 May 1981) was an Argentine-French surrealist painter and engraver who was a part of the art studio Atelier 17.

== Early life and education ==
Nina Negri was born on 24 December 1901 (Note: According to the Bibliothèque nationale de France, however some sources dispute this stating she was born in 1909.) in Rosario to Mathilde Marino and Victor Negri. She began her artistic studies in Buenos Aires under the tuition of Benito Guzmán. Afterwards, she travelled to Oxford, Belgium and France to further her studies. Negri later returned to Argentina to study psychology and Native American anthropology. Eventually by 1921, Negri had settled in Paris, and studied under André Lhote, Fernand Léger and Marcel Gromaire.

== Career ==
Negri was introduced to printmaker Stanley William Hayter by her art teachers, and she soon began working at his studio Atelier 17. She exhibited her work with the studio, as well as at collective exhibitions including the Salon des Indépendants and the Salon de Mai in Paris.

From 1931, Negri and other artists at Atelier 17 experimented with making plaster casts from engraved metal plates, and experimented further with the casts by scratching and adding colour to them. She later continued to experiment with different colour techniques in her art, including being one of the first to experiment with what later became known as simultaneous colour printmaking.

Negri's work was displayed at the Exposition Internationale du Surréalisme in 1938, and apart from Hayter, was the only one to display engravings. From 18 June to 8 October 1944, her art was showcased in the exhibition Hayter and Studio 17: New Directions in Gravure at the Museum of Modern Art in New York City. Her work was displayed for ten years from 1949 to 1959 in the Parisian exhibition Salon des Réalités Nouvelles. In addition, she travelled around Africa, Europe and South America, and her art was exhibited worldwide.

In 1940, Hayter relocated Atelier 17 to New York City and ran it there for a decade. After World War II, Negri focused on creating more abstract art. When Hayter then returned Atelier 17 back to Paris in 1950, Negri rejoined. At the studio during the 1950s, she worked on colour printing experiments and collaborated with Ian Hugo on relief engraving.

== Death and legacy ==
Negri married and later divorced Claude Popelin.

Nina Negri died at 2:00 p.m. in the 7th arrondissement of Paris on 29 May 1981, at the age of 79.

Her artwork was featured in the 2002 exhibit Elles de Montparnasse (Women of Montparnasse) at the Montparnasse Museum, which focused on the liberation of women artists between the world wars.
