= Andre Racz =

American artist

- Born: November 21, 1916; Cluj, Romania
- Died: September 29, 1994 (aged 77); Englewood, New Jersey
- Known for: Artist, Educator

Andre Racz (1916-1994) was an American printmaker and educator known for his drawings and etchings.

== Biography ==
Racz was born November 21, 1916, in Cluj, Romania. He attended the University of Bucharest graduating in 1935.

In 1939 he came to New York City as part of the Romanian Art Commission to the New York World's Fair. He remained in New York where he studied printmaking at the Atelier 17. In 1948 Racz became a naturalized citizen of the United States. Racz was the recipient of a Guggenheim Fellowship and also received a Fulbright resident scholarship, as well as a Ford Foundation Fellowship.

In 1951 Racz began his teaching career at Columbia University. He remained on the faculty for thirty two years teaching painting and sculpture. When he retired in 1983 he was named professor emeritus. He died on September 29, 1994, in Englewood, New Jersey.

Racz's work is included in the collections of the Museum of Modern Art, the National Gallery of Art, the Smithsonian American Art Museum, and the Whitney Museum of American Art,
