= Dimitri Petrov (artist) =

American artist

- Born: 1919; Philadelphia, Pennsylvania
- Died: 1986 (aged 66–67); Woodstock, New York
- Known for: Painting, Printmaking
- Movement: Dada, Surrealism

Dimitri Petrov (1919-1986) was an American Dada and Surrealist painter and printmaker.

== Biography ==
Petrov was born in 1919 in Philadelphia, Pennsylvania. He studied at the Pennsylvania Academy of the Fine Arts. He was associated with the New York print studio Atelier 17.

He exhibited his work at the Art Institute of Chicago, the Corcoran Gallery of Art, and the Whitney Museum of American Art. He was a member of the Woodstock Art Association.

Petrov died in Woodstock, New York in 1986.

Petrov's work is included in the collections of the Museum of Modern Art and the Smithsonian American Art Museum.
