= Terry Haass =

French artist (1923–2016)

- Born: Theresa Goldmannová; 17 November 1923; Český Těšín, Czechoslovakia
- Died: 1 March 2016 (aged 92); Paris, France
- Education: Art Students League of New York; Atelier 17
- Known for: Painting

Terry Haass (née Goldmannová; 17 November 1923 – 1 March 2016) was a Czechoslovak-born French artist known for her printmaking, painting, and sculpture.

== Biography ==
Haass was born on 17 November 1923 in Český Těšín, Czechoslovakia. in 1938 she and her family fled from antisemitism in Czechoslovakia to Paris, France then fled the Nazi invasion there, settling in New York in 1941. Around that time she married Walter Haass who she later divorced.

In New York City, Haass attended the Art Students League of New York and the Atelier 17. In 1951, she and fellow artist Harry Hoehn co-directed the New York location of Atelier 17. By the end of that year Haass moved back to Paris. In 1952, Haass had a solo exhibition at the Smithsonian Institution. In 1953, Haass' work was included in the Museum of Modern Art's Young American Printmakers exhibition.

Haass studied and worked in Paris, becoming a French citizen in 1963.

Haass died on 1 March 2016, aged 92, in Paris.
