= Ruth Cyril =

American printmaker

- Cyril c. 1960
- Born: Ruth Goldfarb
- Known for: Printmaking

Ruth Cyril (1920–1988), also known as B. Cyril, was an American printmaker.

== Early life ==
She was born Ruth Goldfarb on 1920 in New York City. Her date of birth is reported variously as 1920 or 1938, likely as a result of her name change to Cyril. She was raised in a working class family in the Bronx, where she attended Walton High School.

She studied at Greenwich House Art School, the School of Contemporary Art, New York University, The New School and the Art Students League of New York.

Around 1947, she began using Cyril instead of Goldfarb as her last name; later she stopped using "Ruth" and went by the androgynous mononym, Cyril.

== Art career ==
Cyril was known as an experimental printmaker who incorporated sculptural techniques she learned as a jewelry designer. She was a member of the Society of American Graphic Artists and the New York printmakers' group Atelier 17. Her prints had a "sculptural depth" which was achieved by "violent open-biting in the acid bath" creating a deep relief on the printing plate. She also used wire brushes to create atmospheric qualities.

In 1957, she was awarded with a Fulbright grant to France, where she continued her studies at the Sorbonne’s Institut d’Art et d’Archéologie. She went on to work for La Guilde Internationale de la Gravure, a publisher of prints.

Cyril's work was widely exhibited during her lifetime, having solo exhibitions in Paris, London, and New York, where she was affiliated with the galleriest Leo Castelli as well as showing with M. Knoedler & Co. In 1959, she put together a show of prints that traveled to several museums including the Portland Art Museum, the McNay Art Museum, the Addison Gallery of American Art, and others, which continued to travel into the 1960s.

== Collections ==
Her work is included in the collections of the Seattle Art Museum, the National Gallery of Art, Washington, the Victoria and Albert Museum, London, the Art Institute of Chicago the Metropolitan Museum of Art, New York, the Indianapolis Museum of Art, and the Albright Knox Art Gallery.
