= Harold Paris =

American artist

- Harold Paris, 1977 by Mimi Jacobs
- Born: August 16, 1925; Edgemere, Long Island, New York, U.S.
- Died: July 1, 1979 (aged 53); El Cerrito, California, U.S.
- Education: Academy of Fine Arts, Munich, Atelier 17
- Known for: Printmaking, sculpture
- Movement: Abstract Expressionism
- Spouse: Deborah Little Paris

Harold Persico Paris (August 16, 1925 – July 1, 1979) was an American printmaker, sculptor and educator. He taught art classes at the University of California, Berkeley from 1963 until 1979.

== Early life and education ==
Paris was born on August 16, 1925, in Edgemere, Long Island, New York. In World War II he served as a correspondent for the American military newspaper Stars and Stripes and during that time he witnessed the death camps at Buchenwald concentration camp which had a profound effect on him and his art. Paris studied printmaking at Atelier 17 in New York City and sculptural casting at the Academy of Fine Arts, Munich (German: Akademie der Bildenden Künste) in Munich. In 1953 and 1954 he received a Guggenheim Fellowship. He was also the recipient of a Fulbright Grant and a Tiffany Foundation grant.

== Career and late life ==
In the early 1960s Paris settled in California. In 1963 he became a professor at University of California, Berkeley. He taught printmaking and sculpture and co-founded the bronze foundry there. One of Paris' students was Shirin Neshat. Paris was also an involved with the Peter Voulkos' pot palace ceramic studio.

Paris exhibited extensively while in California. In 1972 a major exhibition of his work The California Years was held at the University Art Museum in Berkeley.

Paris died in El Cerrito, California, on July 1, 1979.

== Collections ==
Paris' work is included in the collections of the Art Institute of Chicago, the Museum of Modern Art, the National Gallery of Art, the San Francisco Museum of Modern Art, and the Whitney Museum of American Art. His papers are in the Archives of American Art at the Smithsonian Institution.
