= José Guerrero (artist) =

Spanish painter (1914–1991)

- Born: October 29, 1914; Granada
- Died: December 23, 1991 (aged 77); Barcelona
- Movement: Abstract expressionism

José García Guerrero (October 29, 1914 – December 23, 1991), better known as José Guerrero, was a Spanish artist, notable for his abstract expressionist paintings, who spent much of his working life in U.S.A.

== Biography ==
Guerrero was born in Granada, where, from 1930 to 1934, he attended art classes at the Escuela de Artes y Oficios. In 1940, on the advice of his friend Federico García Lorca, he moved to Madrid, where he continued his studies until 1945 at the Escuela Superior de Bellas Artes de San Fernando. The same year, he received a grant from the French government to study fresco painting for one year at the École des Beaux-Arts, Paris. During his time in Paris, he saw works by artists such as Juan Gris, Paul Klee, Joan Miró, Pablo Picasso, and especially Henri Matisse, whose influence can be seen in the landscapes and rural scenes Guerrero painted after returning to Spain.

From 1946, Guerrero spent several years traveling across Europe, staying in Bern, Brussels, London, Paris, and Rome. In Rome, he became friends with the artist brothers Afro and Mirko Basaldella. He also met Roxanne Whittier Pollock, an American journalist. The couple married in 1949, and moved to the United States, staying first in Philadelphia and settling a year later in New York.

Guerrero now became acquainted with many prominent members of the American avant-garde, including the artists Willem de Kooning, Franz Kline, Robert Motherwell, Ad Reinhardt, Mark Rothko, and Theodoros Stamos, and with James Johnson Sweeney, art critic and director of the Guggenheim Museum. Guerrero painted his last figurative work (a self-portrait) in 1950, and thereafter devoted himself to abstract expressionism. In 1954, his paintings were exhibited at the Betty Parsons Gallery, and in Sweeney's exhibition Younger American Painters: A Selection. He used his skills in fresco to collaborate with architects on postwar reconstruction projects, winning a fellowship from the Graham Foundation of Chicago for such work. In 1965, he returned to Spain, and from then on divided his time between there and U.S.A. He produced portfolios of graphic works to accompany the poems of Jorge Guillen, Stanley Kunitz and others. He died in Barcelona in 1991, survived by his wife, a son and a daughter.

== Assessment ==
According to an assessment on the Guggenheim Foundation's website, in Guerrero's early abstract style "simplified, biomorphic forms float in a quasi-monochromatic background". By the mid-1950s it "had become more gestural, expressing a deeper sense of urgency, as he loosened his brushstroke and introduced a controlled dripping technique". After his first return to Spain, he "reintegrat[ed] purer colors in his works, distant from the anxiety-ridden, predominantly black paintings of the late 1950s". His style continued to evolve through the 1970s and 1980s, "as he created orderly and rhythmic vertical compositions, followed by increasingly dynamic works in which brilliant hues took the lead". According to art critic Grace Glueck, he was "[k]nown for big, vibrantly colored paintings whose abstract imagery suggested landscape, primitive architecture and atmospheric events". She quotes him as saying that the structure of his paintings was based on "vertical thrusts or horizontal tensions and diagonal crisscrossings".

== Exhibitions and collections ==
His work is held by several prominent collections, including those of the Guggenheim, Whitney and Brooklyn Museums in New York, and from 2000 in the Centro José Guerrero, Granada. His solo exhibitions include: 1952 – Smithsonian Institution, Washington, D.C.; 1954 and 1958 – Betty Parsons Gallery; 1964 – Galería Juana Mordó, Madrid (es); 1981 – Escuela de Artes y Oficios; 1990 – Museo de Arte Contemporáneo, Seville (es). In 1994, there was a major retrospective of his work at Museo Nacional Centro de Arte Reina Sofía, Madrid. In 2014, an exhibition organized by Yolanda Romero (director from 2000 of Centro José Guerrero) entitled José Guerrero: The Presence of Black, 1950-1966 was toured in Granada, Madrid and Barcelona.

From 21 May - 18 July 1998, the Museu Fundación Juan March, Palma exhibited José Guerrero. Works on Paper (1970-1985). The exhibit displayed “five series of his work on paper - 48 works in all, mainly ink drawings, gouaches and mixed media works - made by the artist between 1970 and 1985.” The show later traveled to Museo de Arte Abstracto Español, Cuenca (28 July - 22 November 1998).

From 3 April - 26 May 2019, the Centro José Guerrero, Granada exhibited José Guerrero. Pelegrinaje (1966-1969). (Pelegrinaje means pilgrimage in English.) The paintings displayed were created after Guerrero’s return to Spain after living in New York for two decades. The exhibit later traveled to Museo de Arte Abstracto Español, Cuenca (14 June - 29 September 2019) and Museu Fundación Juan March, Palma (16 October 2019 - 18 January 2020).
