= Josef Presser =

American artist

- Born: 1907; Lublin, Poland
- Died: 1967 (aged 59–60); Paris, France
- Known for: Painting
- Spouse: Agnes Hart

Josef Presser (1907–1967) was an American artist.

== Biography ==
Presser was born in 1907 in Lublin, Poland. He emigrated to the United States at the age of 12 and studied at the Boston School of the Museum of Fine Arts. During the 1930s, Presser painted murals as part of the Works Progress Administration program. He settled in New York City where he worked as a painter and teacher. He married fellow artist Agnes Hart (1912-1979) in 1941. The couple had studio space in Woodstock, New York. He was associated with the New York print studio Atelier 17. Presser died in Paris in 1967.

Presser's work is included in the collections of the Metropolitan Museum of Art, the National Gallery of Art, the Smithsonian American Art Museum, and the Whitney Museum of American Art, His papers are in the Smithsonian Archives of American Art.
