= Leon Presser =

American computer scientist

Leon Presser is an American professor, entrepreneur, writer and software engineer. He was honored by the White House as an influential Hispanic leader.

== Academics ==
Presser obtained a BS degree in electrical engineering from the University of Illinois in 1961. He then moved to Los Angeles, California, and went to work in the nascent computer industry as a computer designer. At the same time, he pursued a master's degree in Electrical Engineering (Computer Science), which he received from the USC in 1964. He then joined the computer research group at UCLA, where he simultaneously commenced his studies for a PhD in Computer Science, which he received in 1968.

In 1968, he joined the Computer Science faculty at UCLA. In 1969, he moved to the Engineering faculty at the UCSB, where he was responsible for the initial development of its Computer Science program. He remained at UCSB until 1976.

While at UCSB, he founded and led a research group working on software development methodologies and tools. During this time he also served as a consultant to the United States government and to industry. By 1976, he had published over thirty research papers in the software field, and he had organized and participated in a number of national and international conferences on software. He also served as National Lecturer on Computer Operating Systems for the Association for Computing Machinery. He was the recipient of the Distinguished Lecturer award from the Data Processing Management Association. He was the editor of the Institute of Electrical and Electronics Engineers 1976 Special Issue on Computer Operating Systems.

== Entrepreneur ==
In 1977, Presser founded Softool Corporation, a software products company based in Santa Barbara, California. Softool was dedicated to the creation and marketing of software tools. Besides a presence throughout the United States, Softool owned subsidiaries in Great Britain, France, Germany and Italy.

In 1989, L. William Seidman and Steven L. Skancke wrote a book entitled Productivity: the American Advantage in which they selected fifty U.S. companies and discussed how they were regaining the competitive edge for the United States. Softool was one of the selected companies.

Among other product lines, Softool created and marketed a family of software tools to manage change. These change management tools led to the creation of a whole new segment of products in the software industry. Softool was sold in 1995 to Platinum Technology Inc.

In 1987, Presser co-founded Compass Corporation, a software services company based in Vienna, Virginia. After rapid growth, Compass was sold in 1990.

In March 1989, Software Magazine published a special issue listing Presser as one of the 100 people who have had the greatest impact on the software industry.

In July 1992, Presser was honored at the White House by President George H. W. Bush as one of a group of outstanding Hispanic leaders in the United States.

In October 2014, Presser was honored by the University of Illinois Department of Electrical and Computer Engineering with its Distinguished Alumni Award.

In March 2018, Presser was inducted into the Hillel Hall of Fame at the University of California, Santa Barbara for contributions to the Santa Barbara community.

== Books ==
- What It Takes to Be an Entrepreneur: A Navigational Guide to Achieve Success by Leon Presser
- Computer science by Alfonso F. Cárdenas, Leon Presser, Miguel A. Marin
- The structure, specification, and evaluation of translators and translator writing systems by Leon Presser
