= Helen Phillips (artist) =

American sculptor, printmaker and graphic artist

- Phillips printing at Atelier 17, Paris, ca. 1950-1955
- Born: March 3, 1913; Fresno, California
- Died: January 23, 1995 (aged 81); New York, New York
- Other name: Helen Phillips Hayter
- Education: San Francisco Art Institute, Atelier 17
- Known for: sculpture, printmaking
- Spouse: Stanley William Hayter (m. 1940; divorced in 1972)

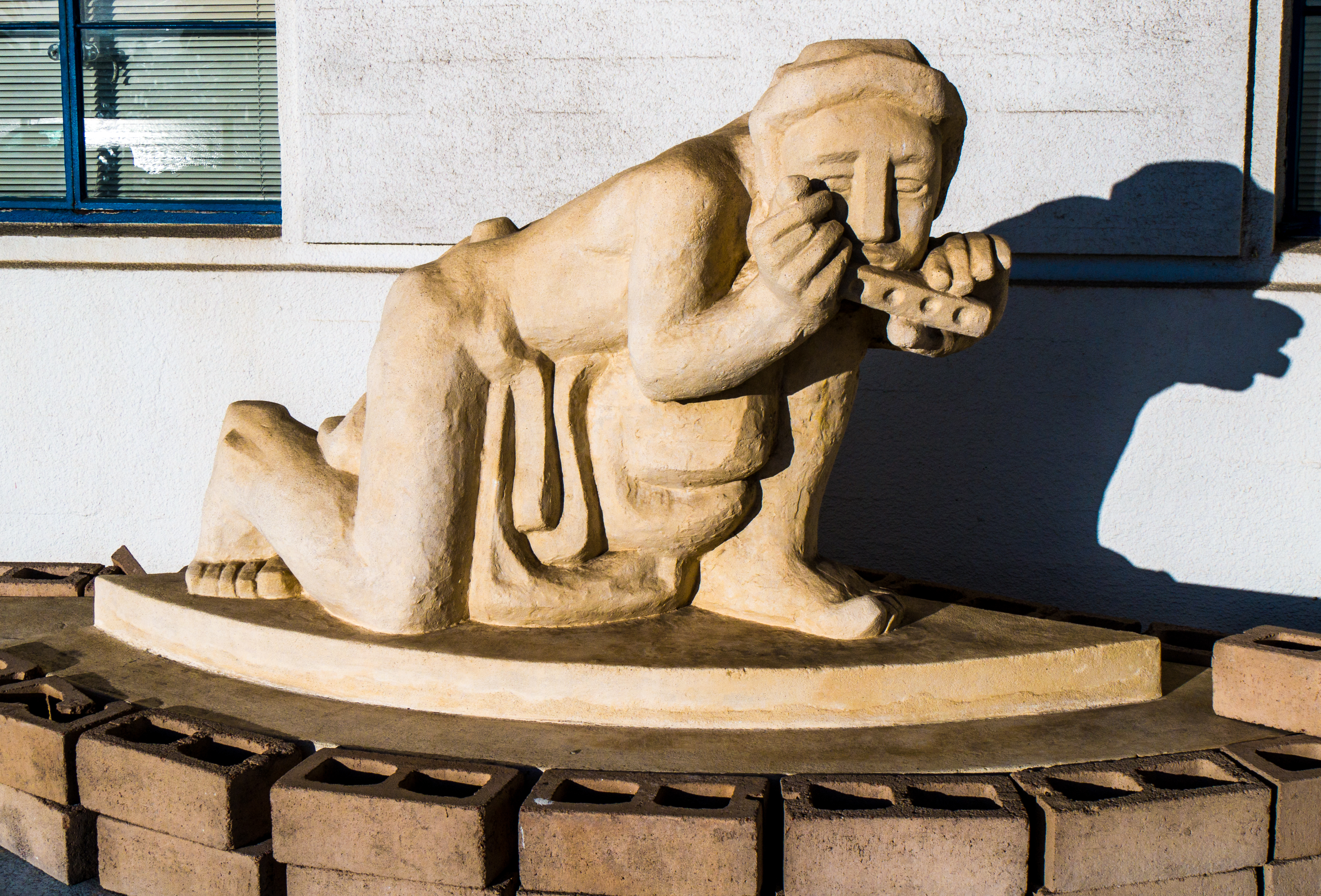
Chinese musician sculpture by Phillips for the Golden Gate International Exposition

Helen Elizabeth Phillips, also known as Helen Phillips Hayter (March 3, 1913 – January 23, 1995), was an American sculptor, printmaker, and graphic artist active in San Francisco, New York, and Paris. During her life, she contributed to various avant-gardes of the 20th century, with a personal, de-conditioned vision, which evolved from the surrealist practices the 30s to the adoption of a repeated geometric unit to express the three-dimensional movement in sculpture. Her biomorphic, hermetic imaginary, her use of positive and negative spaces in both sculpture and printmaking, and her strong, pure color, opened new paths in artistic expression.

== Formative Years: San Francisco to Paris ==
Helen Elizabeth Phillips was born on March 3, 1913, in Fresno, California. From 1932 to 1936, she studied at the California School of Fine Arts (now the San Francisco Art Institute) in San Francisco with Ralph Stackpole and Gottardo Piazzoni. In 1935, her piece Young Woman garnered the San Francisco Art Association’s purchase prize award, and she also won the prestigious Phelan Traveling Fellowship that year and traveled to Mexico and Europe.

In 1936, Phillips won the school's Phelan Travelling Fellowship, a competitive scholarship with which she funded a year of study abroad. In September, Phillips was living in Paris where she met many artists, including Ed Melcarth (American, 1914–1973) and the American artist couple Dickson Reeder (1912–1970) and Flora Blanc (later Flora Reeder, 1916–1995). The Reeders introduced Phillips to Stanley William (Bill) Hayter (British, 1901–1988), founder of the experimental printmaking studio Atelier 17. Atelier 17’s attendees were the leading modernists: Max Ernst, Alberto Giacometti, Joan Miró, and Vieira da Silva. Some of Phillips’s early prints, like Untitled (Paris) document her exercises with the burin tool and demonstrate that she explored sculptural ideas in print. Engraving opened new horizons for her as she could experiment new imagery more easily than with sculpture. It also transformed her conception between negative and positive space.

In 1937, she returned to San Francisco where she showed in the Pacific Court for the Golden Gate International Exposition. The three sculptures created by Helen Phillips evoke Chinese musicians: Blowing the Horn, Playing the Flute and Banging the Drum.

Phillips moved back to Paris in 1938, where she continued to work at Atelier 17. By April 1939, she exhibited with other Atelier 17 artists at Galerie de Beaune. Phillips and Hayter, now a couple, fled to London when they finally needed to leave Paris during the war. Most works Phillips left behind are now lost, only a few were salvaged by Peggy Guggenheim. They stayed for a few months with their friend Julian Trevelyan and spent time with Lee Miller, Roland Penrose, and Erno and Ursula Goldfinger and in 1940 they left for the United States.

== New York Years ==
In 1940, Phillips and Hayter travelled by train to San Francisco, but stopped in Reno to get married. At the end of the summer, they welcomed their first son, August (Augy). They moved around in New York and Connecticut until finally, in 1944, the family of four settled at 247 Waverly Place, where both artists had space to work. Phillips took over the dining room in front for her sculpture, within view of the kitchen, where she put Julian’s playpen. This is where she resumed stone carving when time was available since she took the parental load of caring for a baby and a toddler while Hayter taught and spent time at Atelier 17. With two young children, she produced very few prints, but worked eagerly in sculpture. In New York, Phillips’s work was presented in many significant exhibitions. In 1941 her hieratic sculpture Inverted Head was included in Surrealism, organized by Matta at the New School for Social Research. From 1944, Phillips began to show sculpture in what are now considered landmark avant-garde exhibitions. In 1945 she appeared in Women at Peggy Guggenheim’s Art of This Century gallery. Her most significant invitation was to exhibit alongside some of the foremost Surrealists in the Bloodflames exhibition at the Hugo Gallery in 1947, curated by Nicolas Calas (Greek, 1907–1988), where her bronzes Moto perpetuo and Dualism, 1944-45 were highlighted. The other artists were Arshile Gorky, David Hare, Roberto Matta, Wilfredo Lam, and Isamu Noguchi. In 1949 Hayter and Phillips featured together in Sidney Janis exhibition Artists: Man and wife.

== Paris 1950s ==
In 1950 Phillips, Hayter, and their sons returned to Paris, and the 50s and 60s proved to be productive for Phillips’s career and successful exhibition in public spaces and yearly presence in various French and Internationals Salons. She showed fourteen sculptures at the Petit Palais for the exhibition New York Six. In 1953, she received the Copley Foundation Sculpture Prize—the French prize in an international competition—for her bronze sculpture Metamorphose II (1951–52). She exhibited regularly at the Salon de Mai in the 1950s and 1960s. In London, Phillips was guest of honor at the Women’s International Art Club in 1955 and exhibited prints at the Erskine Gallery that same year. Other notable exhibitions of her prints in the 1950s included a solo exhibition at Galerie La Hune in 1954 and a joint exhibition with Hayter at the Palace of the Legion of Honor, San Francisco, in 1956. Her sculptures were shown in the This is Tomorrow exhibition in London (1956) and 4 Artistes Américains de Paris at the American Cultural Center in Paris (1958).

In the 1950s, Phillips’s prints combined deep bite etching and simultaneous color printing—leaving out burin work altogether. In 1953 Phillips and Hayter bought a house in Alba la Romaine, in the Ardeche, where they spent their summers. Phillips started carving monumental totems in ancient oak; her images and colors in printmaking became bolder, decisive, and increased in size. An exploration of anthropomorphic forms, the sculptures and prints produced in these years evoke abstract body-parts and claw-like animal forms.

She also produced long series of metallic, geometric constructions in iron rods with which she explored the idea of a modular growth, preconized by the theories of D’Arcy Thompson and of the visionary architectural theories of Buckminster Fuller. Using Thompson’s concept of a universal pattern, she evolved a seemingly endless variety of forms, columns, spirals etc. in geometric relationship: a “Module of Growth”.

== After 1960 ==
Two major shifts occurred in Phillips’s life in the late 1960s impacting the physicality of sculpting and printmaking. In 1967, she injured her back while moving Alabaster Column, which had been just bought by the Knox Albright Museum, and her marriage ended (eventually finalized in 1972). In her printed work, she became focused on optical and geometric allover patterns.

== Bibliography ==
Braff, Phyllis. The Surrealists and Their Friends on Eastern Long Island at Mid-Century. East Hampton, NY: Guild Hall of East Hampton, 1996.

Clarac-Sérou, Max. Cuivres Gravés et Sculptés Par Helen Phillips. Paris: La Hune, 1954.

Cohen, David. “Obituary: Helen Phillips.” Independent, February 17, 1995.

Darwent, Charles. Surrealists in New York: Atelier 17 and the Birth of Abstract Expressionism. London: Thames & Hudson, 2023.

Hayter, Carla Esposito. Miró in New York, 1947: Miró, Hayter and Atelier 17. Easton, MD: Academy Art Museum, 2021.

Prints by Stanley William Hayter and Helen Phillips. San Francisco: Achenbach Foundation for Graphic Arts, 1956.

Sharp, Marynell. “Man and Wife.” Art Digest 24 (October 1, 1949): 12.

Story, Christa. Form, Growth, and Variation: The Experimental Prints of Helen Phillips. Beloit, WI, 2023.

Weyl, Christina. Innovation and Abstraction: Women Artists and Atelier 17. East Hampton, NY: Pollock-Krasner House and Study Center, 2016.

———.“Shifting Focus: Women Printmakers of Atelier 17.” Woman’s Art Journal 39, no. 1 (June 2018):12–22.

———.The Women of Atelier 17: Modernist Printmaking in Midcentury New York. New Haven: Yale University Press, 2019.

“Young Americans: Helen Phillips.” American Magazine of Art 29, no. 8 (August 1936): 532–33.

== Collections ==
- Albright-Knox Art Gallery, Buffalo, New York
- Fine Arts Museums of San Francisco, San Francisco, California
- Museum of Modern Art, New York City, New York
- San Francisco Museum of Modern Art, San Francisco, California
- Smithsonian American Art Museum, Washington, D.C.
- Sterling and Francine Clark Art Institute, Williamstown, Massachusetts
- Treasure Island Museum, San Francisco, California
