= Kayqubad =

The name Kayqubad (Bengali: কায়কোবাদ, Persian: کیقباد) may refer to the following people

- Kayqubad I (1190–1237), Seljuq Sultan of Rûm
- Kayqubad II (c. 1238–1256), Seljuq Sultan of Rûm
- Muiz ud din Qaiqabad (1269–1290), Mamluk Sultan of Delhi
- Kayqubad III (c. 1283–1302), Seljuq Sultan of Rûm
- Kayqubad I of Shirvan (died 1348), Shah of Shirvan
- Kaykobad (Kazem Ali Qureshi Kaykobad; 1857–1951), Bengali poet
- Mohammad Kaykobad (born 1954), Bangladeshi computer scientist and educator
- Kazi Shah Mofazzal Hossain Kaikobad (born 1956), Bangladeshi politician
- Kazi Sharif Kaikobad (born 1965), Bangladeshi major general

== See also ==
- Kay Kawad
- Kayqubadiyya Palace
