= Kurt Roesch =

American painter (1905–1984)

- Kurt Roesch in 1958
- Born: September 12, 1905; Berlin, Germany
- Died: October 8, 1984 (aged 79); Connecticut, U.S.
- Known for: Painting

Man with Bird by Kurt Roesch, Honolulu Museum of Art

Kurt Ferdinand Roesch (1905–1984) was a German-born American painter.

== Biography ==
Roesch was born on September 12, 1905 in Berlin and studied painting with the expressionist Karl Hofer. Roesch immigrated to the United States in 1933, living first in Katonah, New York, and then in New Canaan, Connecticut. He taught at Sarah Lawrence College from 1934 to 1972, and died October 8, 1984, at his home in New Canaan.

Man with Bird from 1977, in the collection of the Honolulu Museum of Art, demonstrates his semiabstract images that often reference animals or plants. The Butler Institute of American Art (Youngstown, Ohio), the Columbus Museum of Art (Columbus, Ohio), the Frederick R Weisman Art Museum (Minneapolis, Minnesota), the Honolulu Museum of Art, the Metropolitan Museum of Art, the Museum of Modern Art (New York City), and the Sheldon Museum of Art (Lincoln, Nebraska) are among the public collections holding works by Roesch.
