= Kaikō Maru =

History
- Name: Kaikō Maru
- Operator: Institute of Cetacean Research
- Launched: 1972
- Identification: Call sign: T8XX; IMO number: 7394101; MMSI number: 511011055
- Fate: Sold to Specialized Vessel Services and renamed 'SVS Frobisher'
- Notes: Spotter ship for ICR

General characteristics
- Tonnage: 860 t
- Length: 62 m (203 ft 5 in)
- Beam: 11 m (36 ft 1 in)
- Draught: 4.3 m (14 ft 1 in)
- Speed: 5.3 knots (9.8 km/h; 6.1 mph)

Kaikō Maru (海幸丸; now SVS Frobisher) was the spotter ship for the Japanese whaling fleet. In 2007, it collided with the Sea Shepherd Conservation Society vessel MY Robert Hunter and was disabled. It sent out a mayday (call for help) and Robert Hunter, Farley Mowat, and Esperanza were obliged to respond until Kaiko Maru was repaired.

It was sold in 2013 to Specialised Vessel Services as a patrol vessel and renamed as SVS Frobisher.
