= Józef Hecht =

Polish printmaker and painter (1891–1951)

- Born: 14 December 1891; Łódź, Poland
- Died: 19 June 1951 (aged 59); Paris, France
- Education: Art Academy of Kraków
- Known for: Engraving, Printmaking

Józef Hecht (14 December 1891 – 19 June 1951), also known as Joseph Hecht, was a printmaker and painter. Born and educated in Poland, he made Paris his base from 1920. Trained in classical engraving techniques, Hecht was a founder of "Atelier 17", and had a profound influence on 20th-century printmakers.

== Career ==
Born in Łódź, Poland, in 1891, Hecht studied at the Art Academy of Kraków from 1909 to 1914. On completion of his studies in Kraków, Hecht visited museums throughout Europe. The outbreak of World War I found him in Berlin. Due to the fact that he had done his studies in the Austrian zone in Poland and thanks to prizes obtained at the Académie des Beaux-Arts, Hecht was given the option of going to neutral Norway, where he lived from 1914 to 1919.

Immediately following the armistice, Hecht traveled to Italy; and two years later to Paris, where he maintained his studio until his death. At this time Hecht became a member of the Salon d'Automne, thereby gaining an entrée into the Parisian art world and a chance to exhibit his work on a regular basis. At his Paris studio, he taught burin-engraving - the classic copper-engraving technique - to many artists, including British surrealist painter and printmaker Stanley William Hayter, South African-born British painter and printmaker Dolf Rieser.

The year 1926 was a turning point in Hecht's career and heralded the most successful period of his life. He published his first suite of six prints, l'Arche de Noë, which included a preface by the French symbolist Gustave Kahn and was exhibited in December that year at the Paris gallery Le nouvel essor. Hecht's future collaborator, mystical narrator André Suarès, wrote a laudatory catalogue article. The images that Hecht developed at this time found renewed vigor in 1928 when Suarès and Hecht collaborated on the folio, Atlas. In Atlas Hecht began to re-combine images and forms he had previously studied—a working method that he refined throughout his life.

In 1927 Hecht's encouragement of Hayter's printmaking activities led to the establishment of Atelier 17, a cooperative printmaking studio, which endures to this day in Paris as Atelier Contrepoint. The "Atelier" influenced artists Pablo Picasso, Marc Chagall, Alberto Giacometti and others.

In 1929 Hecht became a founding member of the group, La Jeune Gravure Contemporaine, which staged annual group shows and was influential in keeping the spirit of printmaking alive. Hecht also associated with members of Les Peintres-Graveurs Indépendants, founded in 1923 by J. E. Laboureur and Raoul Dufy. It is doubtful that Hecht knew each member of these groups, but it is probable that he was familiar with their work and they with his, and that this provided an opportunity for the exchange of techniques, subjects, and ideas. Hecht was an intermediary between the avant-garde artists of Atelier 17 and more traditional printmakers.

Between 1926 and 1938 Hecht's engravings were published in various collections (see Chronology), his work was widely shown, and it gained critical acclaim. Hecht won two gold medals at the 1937 Paris World's Fair.

== Later career and death ==
Of Jewish descent, Hecht left Paris before the start of World War II to live in the Savoy region near the Swiss-Italian border, where he worked as an agricultural laborer.

After the war Hecht returned to Paris. Hayter, who had moved Atelier 17 to New York City for the duration of the war, returned to Paris and found his old friend in poor health and out of work. To encourage Hecht to take up engraving again, Hayter brought a large copper plate to Hecht's studio and began working on it. Hecht could not resist, and together they produced the collaborative print, "La Noyee". With renewed enthusiasm, Hecht began producing numerous engravings, while also developing new methods for printing in relief.

Hecht died of a heart attack in his Paris studio on 19 June 1951.

== Chronology ==
1891 Born on 14 December in Lodz, Poland.
1909 Enters the Académie des Beaux-Arts in Kraków, Poland.
1914 Graduates from the Académie des Beaux-Arts.
Following graduation, travels in Europe, visiting museums, spends a brief period studying in Berlin, then goes to Norway at the outbreak of World War I.
1917 Exhibition at Christiania, Norway.
1918 Exhibitions in Oslo and Bergen, Norway.
1919 Travels to Italy.
1920 Moves to Paris. Becomes a member of the Salon d'Automne and begins to exhibit with them.
1921 Begins to exhibit at the Salon des Indépendants. Exhibition at Washington, D.C.
1923 Exhibitions in Philadelphia, at the Salon des Tuileries and the Galerie Le Nouvel Essor, Paris.
1926 Publishes l'Arche de Noë, a suite of six engravings with a preface by Gustave Kahn; l'Eubage aux Antipodes de l'Unité, five engravings with prose by Blaise Cendrars. Exhibitions at Galere Berthe Weil, Paris, and at Galerie Le Nouvel Essor, Paris. Meets Stanley William Hayter.
1927 Helps Hayter establish Atelier 17, Paris. Writes an unpublished treatise on engraving.
1928 Publishes Atlas, a suite of six engravings with a poem by André Suarès. Exhibitions in The Wanamaker Galleries, New York, and at Lodz, Poland.
1929 Publishes Croquis d'Animaux, ten engravings. Exhibition at Gallery Georges, London. Founding member of La Jeune Gravure Contemporaine.
1930 Exhibition at Galerie Berthe Weil, Paris.
1931 Exhibition of La Jeune Gravure Contemporaine.
1932 Exhibition of La Jeune Gravure Contemporaine.
1933 Publishes Paris, a suite of eleven engravings. Exhibition of La Jeune Gravure Contemporaine.
Exhibition in San Francisco.
1934 Exhibition of La Jeune Gravure Contemporaine.
1935 Exhibition of La Jeune Gravure Contemporaine.
1936 Exhibition of La Jeune Gravure Contemporaine.
1937 Wins two gold medals at the International Exposition, Paris.
1938 Publishes Nouveaux Croquis d'Animaux, ten engravings. Begins work on London suite while visiting his sisters.
Exhibitions in Johannesburg and Pretoria, South Africa.
1939 Exhibits in group show at Petit-Palais, Paris.
1941 Exhibition in Paris.
1941–1945 Works as an agricultural laborer in the Savoy region of France. Without access to a press, all work takes the form of drawings or paintings.
1944 Exhibition at Galerie Denise René, Paris.
1946 Resumes printmaking at the urging of Hayter.
1949 Invents a new relief printing process.
1950 Publishes Quelques Aventures de Maitre Renart, with engravings.
1951 Dies of a heart attack in his studio in Paris, 19 June.
Posthumous Exhibitions
1952 La Jeune Gravure Contemporaine, Paris.
1959 Bazalel Museum, Jerusalem.
1966 Galerie Berie, Paris.
1968 Municipal Library, Mulhouse, France.
1969 Lumley Cazalet, Gallery, London.
1985 Dolan/Maxell Gallery, Philadelphia.
1998 Arsène Bonafous-Murat, Paris.

== Public Collections ==
Bibliothèque Doucet; Bibliothèque Nationale; British Museum; Brooklyn Museum; Cabinet d' Amsterdam; Caterby Jones Collection; Chalcographie du Louvre; Cincinnati Museum of Art; Delft Museum; Hague Museum; Leeds Museum; Leyde Museum; Library of Congress; Metropolitan Museum of Art; Musée d'Amiens; Musée des Ars Décoratifs, Paris; Musée de Belfort; Musée Carnavalet; Musée de Céret; Museum of Copenhagen; Musée du Luxembourg; Musée de Montpelier; Musée de Mulhouse; Musée de Nantes; Musée du Petit-Palais; Museum of Tel-Aviv; National Gallery of Art, Washington; New York Public Library; Philadelphia Museum of Art; University of Warsaw; Victoria and Albert Museum.

== Bibliography ==
Books:

- Adhémar, Jean; Lethève, Jacques; and Gardey Fraçoise. Inventaire du Fonds Françis après 1800-Vol. 10. Paris: Bibliothèque Nationale, 1958.
- Bersier, Jean-Eugène. La Gravure. Paris: Berger-Levrault, 1963.
- Black, Peter; and Moorhead, Desiree, The Prints of Stanley William Hayter: A Complete Catalogue. Mount Kisco, NY: Moyer Bell Ltd., 1992.
- Gross, Anthony. Etching, Engraving and Intaglio Printing. London: Oxford University

Press, 1973.

- Hayter, Stanley William. New Ways of Gravure. London: Oxford University Press, 1966.
- Hayter, Stanley William. About Prints. London: Oxford University Press, 1962.
- Tonneau-Ryckelynck, Dominique; and Plumart, Roland, Joseph Hecht 1891-1951: Catalogue Raisonné de l’Oeuvre Gravé. Paris: Editions de Musée de Gravelines, 1992.
- Roger-Marx, Claude. French Original Engravings from Manet to the Present Time. New

York: Hyperion Press, 1939.

Periodicals: Hopkinson, Martin. "Two Bookplates by Joseph Hecht", Print Quarterly, XXVIII, 2011, 448–50. Buckand-Wright, John. "Modern French Engraving," Studio, CXXXVIII (December, 1949), 177–181. Descargues, Pierre. "Joseph Hecht," Evidences, (September–October, 1951), 39–41. Descargues, Pierre. "Contemporary Artists-Joseph Hecht," ARTS, (15 September 1951). "Joseph Hecht à la galerie Bernier," Les nouvelles de la Bibliothèque Nationale, (1985). Kahn, Gusrave. "Les arts-Joseph Hecht," Menorah, (1926), 286. Laboureur, J. E. "The Revival of the Burin in France," Creative Art, V (December, 1929), 881–84. Lévy-Gurman, Anny. "Le Animaux de Joseph Hecht," Art et Décoration, LXI (February, 1934), 44–48. Roger-Marx, Claude. "Contemporary French Prints," Parnassus, IX (February 1937), 15+. Schwab, Raymond. "Souvenirs sur Hecht," ARTS, (7 December 1951). Suarès, André. "Atlas-Gravure de Joseph Hecht," Montparnasse, No. 52 (July–August, 1928), 1, 3.

Catalogues:

- Bonafous-Murat, Anne. Joseph Hecht 1891-1951 Gravures. Paris: Arsène Bonafous-Murat, 1998.
- Gravures et Livres de Joseph Hecht. Mulhouse: Bibliothèque Municipale de Mulhouse,

1968.

- Moser, Joan. Atelier 17. Madison: University of Wisconsin, 1977.
- Roosevelt, Michael A. Joseph Hecht. Philadelphia: Dolan/Maxwell Gallery, 1985.
- Suarès, André. l'Ymagier de l'Arche. Paris: Le Nouvel Essor, 1926.
