= Viscosity printing =

Multi-color printmaking technique

Viscosity printing is a multi-color printmaking technique that incorporates principles of relief printing and intaglio printing. It was pioneered by Stanley William Hayter.

The process uses the principle of viscosity to print multiple colors of ink from a single plate, rather than relying upon multiple plates for color separation. It is a fine art printmaking technique, making original prints in limited editions, as it is slow and allows too much variation between proofs to make large editions feasible. Color viscosity printing is among the latest developments in intaglio printmaking. Color viscosity printing was developed by a group working at Atelier 17 in Paris in the mid-1950s. This group included Stanley William Hayter, Kaiko Moti, Krishna Reddy, Clare Snider Smith and Shirley Wales. Martin Barooshian arrived at Atelier 17 in 1956, working closely with Hayter, Moti, Reddy and in particular Wales. He further innovated color viscosity printmaking, pushing it to its limits to create more objective imagery, ultimately becoming one of its most important masters.

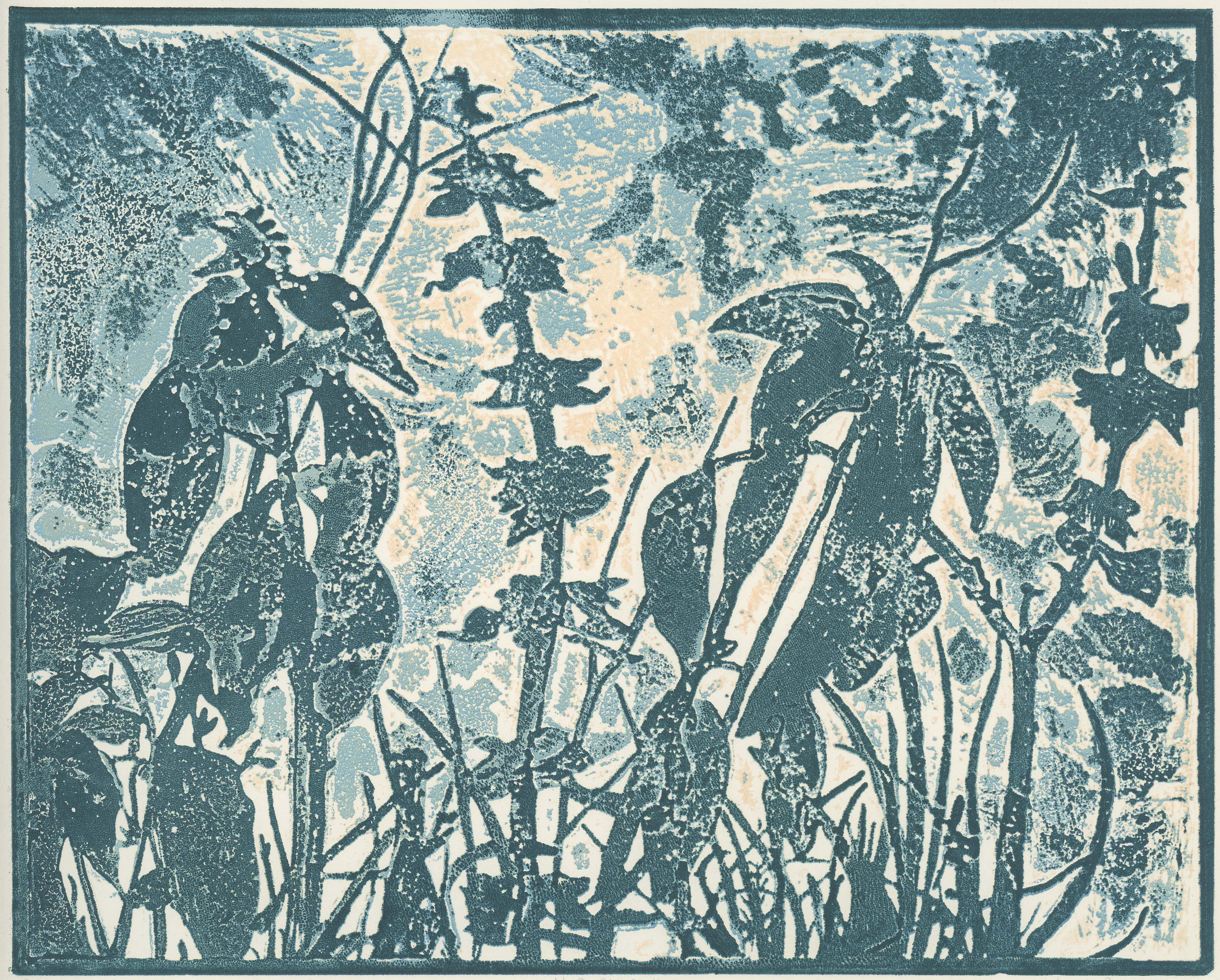
A print made using viscosity printing by Tony Pecoraro.

== Intaglio ==
There are a number of different types of original print methods to be aware of. Intaglio prints: for example a dollar bill—bills and most stamps are engraved in metal plates and are printed after a viscous ink (about the consistency of oil paint) is forced into grooves, scratches, etched lines or indentations. The polished surface is then wiped clean using newsprint and tarlatan, leaving ink only below plate level. The plate is then covered with a dampened paper and felt blankets. It is run through the press where great pressure (approximately 16,000 PSI or 1.103 kbar) pushes the dampened paper down into the engraved or etched grooves to pick up ink. In other words, in intaglio we see printed what is below the surface of the plate and the ink is now embossed on the paper. Among the greatest masters of engraving and etching are Albrecht Dürer, Hans Holbein the Younger, Rembrandt, Goya, and Picasso.

== The process ==
Three to four colors of ink are mixed, each of a different viscosity. This viscosity is adjusted by the addition of uncooked linseed oil.

Metal plates, usually copper or zinc, are used, as in the intaglio processes. The artist produces images on the plate by etching lines or textures. The plate is then inked in several stages. The first ink would be fairly dense—of a relatively high viscosity. The application of the high-viscosity ink is carried out as in any intaglio process: by forcing it into the recesses of the plate and then wiping off the plate's surface with a tarlatan.

Ink of a second color, and the thinnest viscosity, is then applied to the surface of the plate with a hard rubber roller, so that it covers the plate in one pass and only transfers onto the highest areas of the plate. Ink of a third color, and a much stiffer consistency, is then applied to the lower areas of the plate with a softer rubber roller. The varying viscosities of the two rolled-on inks prevent them from mixing. A fourth color, of even thinner viscosity, can also be applied at this point. This color is either spread out on a glass plate, which is then pressed against the printing plate so that the ink only adheres to the highest points of the metal plate, or it is applied by a hard roller applied with very little pressure.

This process may be done with a monotype as well. Inking the acrylic or plexiglass plate with one ink with a very high viscosity, and following that, rolling a very loose ink over it, produces two tones on a single plate. One may attempt to scratch an image onto the plate, but acrylic and plexiglass plates are more temperamental than copper or zinc, and wear out sooner.

A sheet of printing paper is then placed on the upright plate and passed through a printing press, which prints all of the colors simultaneously. This is of a certain advantage, as in some other multi-color printing processes, correct registration of the blocks presents a difficulty.

== See also ==
- Monotyping
