= Stanley William Hayter =

English master printmaker, painter

Stanley William Hayter CBE HonRA
- Hayter, printmaking
- Born: 27 December 1901; London, England
- Died: 4 May 1988 (aged 86); Paris, France
- Education: King's College London; Académie Julian
- Occupations: Master printmaker; painter
- Known for: Founder of Atelier 17; Inventor of Viscosity printing; Printmaking, painting
- Movement: Abstract expressionism; Surrealism; Surrealist automatism
- Awards: Ordre des Arts et des Lettres – Commandeur 1986
- Website: stanley-william-hayter.com

Signature
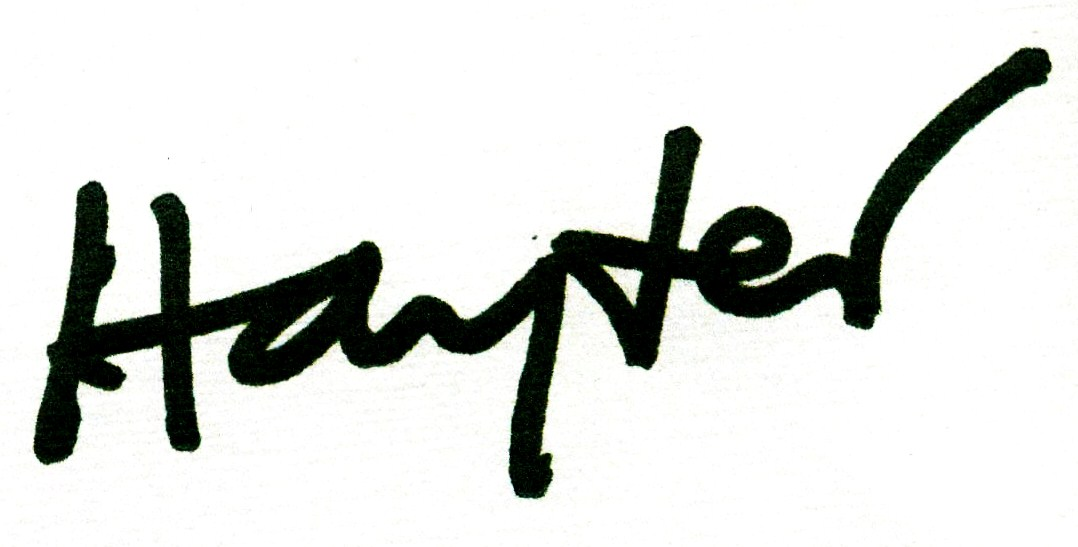

Stanley William Hayter CBE (27 December 1901 – 4 May 1988) was an English painter and master printmaker associated in the 1930s with surrealism and from 1940 onward with abstract expressionism. Regarded as one of the most significant printmakers of the 20th century, in 1927 Hayter founded the influential Atelier 17 studio in Paris. Since his death in 1988, it has been known as Atelier Contrepoint. Among the artists who frequented the atelier were Pablo Picasso, Alberto Giacometti, Joan Miró, Alexander Calder, Marc Chagall, Nemesio Antúnez, Jackson Pollock, Mark Rothko, Wassily Kandinsky, Mauricio Lasansky, K.R.H. Sonderborg, Flora Blanc, Carl Heywood, and Catherine Yarrow.

He is noted for his innovative work in the development of viscosity printing (a process that exploits varying viscosities of oil-based inks to lay three or more colours on a single intaglio plate).

Hayter was equally active as a painter, "Hayter, working always with maximum flexibility in painting, drawing, engraving, collage and low relief has invented some of the most central and significant images of this century before most of the other artists of his generation", wrote Bryan Robertson.

== Early life and education ==
Hayter was born in Hackney, London, on 27 December 1901, the son of painter William Harry Hayter. He received a degree in chemistry and geology from King's College London and worked in Abadan, Iran for the Anglo-Persian Oil Company from 1922 to 1925. After Hayter returned home to convalesce from an attack of malaria, his company arranged a one-man show at their headquarters in London of the paintings and drawings he had made while overseas. The exhibition's success (almost all the paintings sold) may have convinced Hayter to pursue a career as an artist.

== Career ==
=== Paris ===
In 1926, Hayter went to Paris, where he studied briefly at the Académie Julian. That same year, he met Polish printmaker Józef Hecht, who introduced Hayter to copper engraving using the traditional burin technique. Hecht helped Hayter acquire a press for starting a printmaking studio for artists young and old, experienced and inexperienced, to work together in exploring the engraving medium. In 1927, Hayter opened the studio, and in 1933 he moved it to No. 17, rue Campagne-Première, where it became internationally known as Atelier 17.

Hayter worked with many contemporary artists to encourage their exploration of printmaking as a medium. Artists such as Miró, Picasso, Kandinsky, and Dalla Husband collaborated on creating print editions (Fraternité and Solidarité) to raise funds for the support of the Republican cause in the Spanish Civil war.

=== New York City ===
At the outbreak of World War II, Hayter moved Atelier 17 to New York City and taught printmaking at the New School. Artists such as Jackson Pollock, Mauricio Lasansky and Mark Rothko made prints at the New York Atelier 17. During the war, Hayter collaborated with British artist, historian and poet Roland Penrose and others in setting up a commercial camouflage business: the Industrial Camouflage Research Unit. He also first produced finished prints with the method he called "simultaneous color printing," where colour was added to inked intaglio plates by means such as colour-ink-soaked rags, stencils, or rolling a thicker, more viscous ink over a thinner ink, where the thicker ink is rejected and adheres only to the surface surrounding the first ink.

Hayter was an advisor to the Museum of Modern Art for the show Britain at War. In connection with the exhibition, he devised an analogue computer to duplicate the angle of the sun and shadow lengths for any time, day and latitude.

=== Paris ===
Returning to Paris in 1950, Hayter took Atelier 17 with him. Hayter was a prolific printmaker, completing more than 400 works in the medium before his death. In 1949 his book, New Ways of Gravure, was published by Pantheon Books, INC. NY. Oxford University Press published About Prints in 1962. His students included Carmen Gracia and Dolores "Lolo" Soldevilla.

Hayter continued to develop painting alongside printmaking. His interest in automatism led him to associate with the Surrealists, and in the United States, he was an innovator in the Abstract Expressionism movement. His legacy in printmaking, which came to dominate its instruction in the American academy, included vigorous opposition to preparatory drawings and retroussage or hand-wiping with whiting, and endorsement of strong plate tone and improvisation.

In 2005, the Tate Archive acquired a number of Hayter's papers.

== Personal life ==
Hayter was married three times: to Edith Fletcher (dissolved 1929), to American sculptor Helen Phillips (dissolved 1971), and to Désirée Moorhead, with whom he lived in Paris at the time of his death in 1988. He had three sons: Patrick (who died young) from his first marriage, and Augy and Julian Hayter from his second marriage to Helen Phillips. Augy, an actor, writer and translator, died in 2004. Julian, a composer, musician and photographer, died in 2007.

== Honours ==
- 1951 – Appointed an Officer of the Order of the British Empire (OBE)
- 1951 – Awarded, by the French government, the Légion d'honneur.
- 1958 – Chosen as representative artist for Great Britain, at the Venice Biennale.
- 1967 – Appointed a Chevalier des Arts et des Lettres of the Ordre des Arts et des Lettres.
- 1968 – Advanced to Commander of the Order of the British Empire. (CBE)
- 1972 – Received the Grand Prix des Arts de la Ville de Paris.
- 1978 – Elected Foreign Member of the American Academy of Arts and Science.
- 1982 – Elected Honorary Foreign Member of the Royal Academy.
- 1983 – Awarded a Doctorate of Fine Arts of the New School of Social Research, New York and Honorary Doctorate of Hamline University, Minnesota.
- 1986 – Promoted to Commandeur in the Ordre des Arts et des Lettres.
