= Chaim Koppelman =

American painter

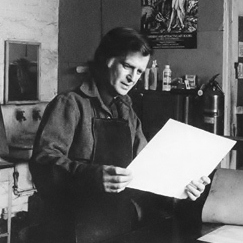
- Koppelman in 1981 (photo by Robert Bianchi)
- Born: November 17, 1920; Brooklyn, New York
- Died: December 6, 2009 (aged 89); Manhattan, New York
- Education: American Artists School, Art Students League, School of Creative Arts, Bristol, École des Beaux Arts, Amédée Ozenfant
- Known for: printmaking, sculpture, painting, drawing
- Spouse: Dorothy Myers
- Website: http://chaimkoppelman.net

Chaim Koppelman (November 17, 1920 – December 6, 2009) was an American artist, art educator, and Aesthetic Realism consultant. Best known as a printmaker, he also produced sculpture, paintings, and drawings. A member of the National Academy of Design since 1978, he was president of the Society of American Graphic Artists (SAGA), which presented him with a Lifetime Achievement Award in 2004. He established the Printmaking Department of the School of Visual Arts in 1959, and taught there until 2007.

Koppelman was an early student of Aesthetic Realism, the philosophy founded in 1941 by Eli Siegel, which is based on the principle, "All beauty is a making one of opposites, and the making one of opposites is what we are going after in ourselves". This principle informed Koppelman's art, teaching, and his work as an Aesthetic Realism consultant. About the importance of this principle to art and life, Koppelman stated, "When Eli Siegel showed that what makes a work of art beautiful – the oneness of opposites – is the same as what every individual wants, it was one of the mightiest and kindest achievements of man's mind".

Koppelman's art is noted for its originality, masterful technique, humor, and power. He is represented in most major print collections, including New York's Museum of Modern Art, Guggenheim Museum, Whitney Museum, Metropolitan Museum, New York Public Library, Brooklyn Museum, Philadelphia Museum of Art, National Gallery, Smithsonian Institution, and Hirshhorn Museum and Sculpture Garden in Washington, D.C., and the Victoria and Albert Museum in London. A retrospective exhibition at the Museo Napoleonico in Rome (2011–12) exposed his work to an international audience.

== Early life and education ==
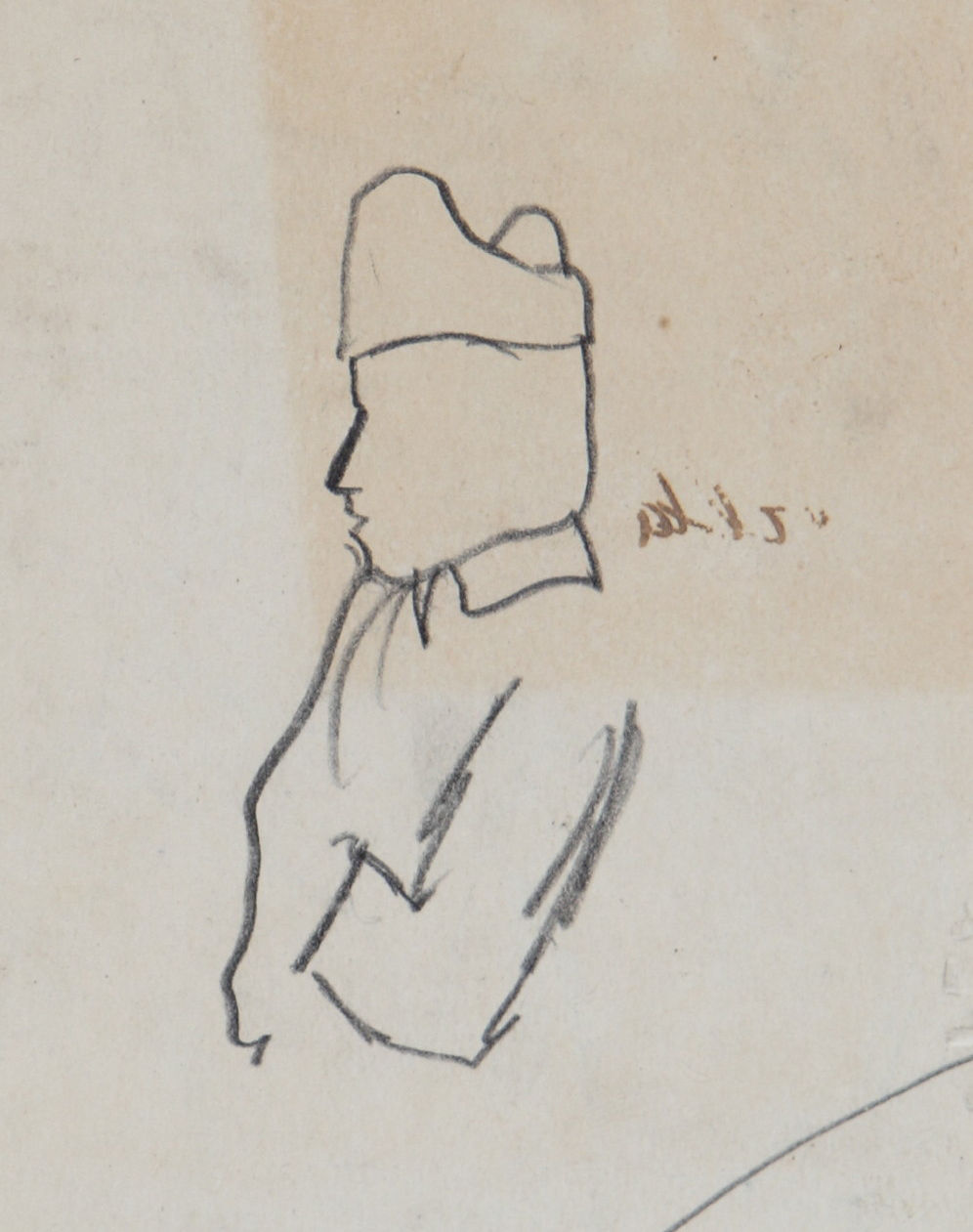
1929 sketch

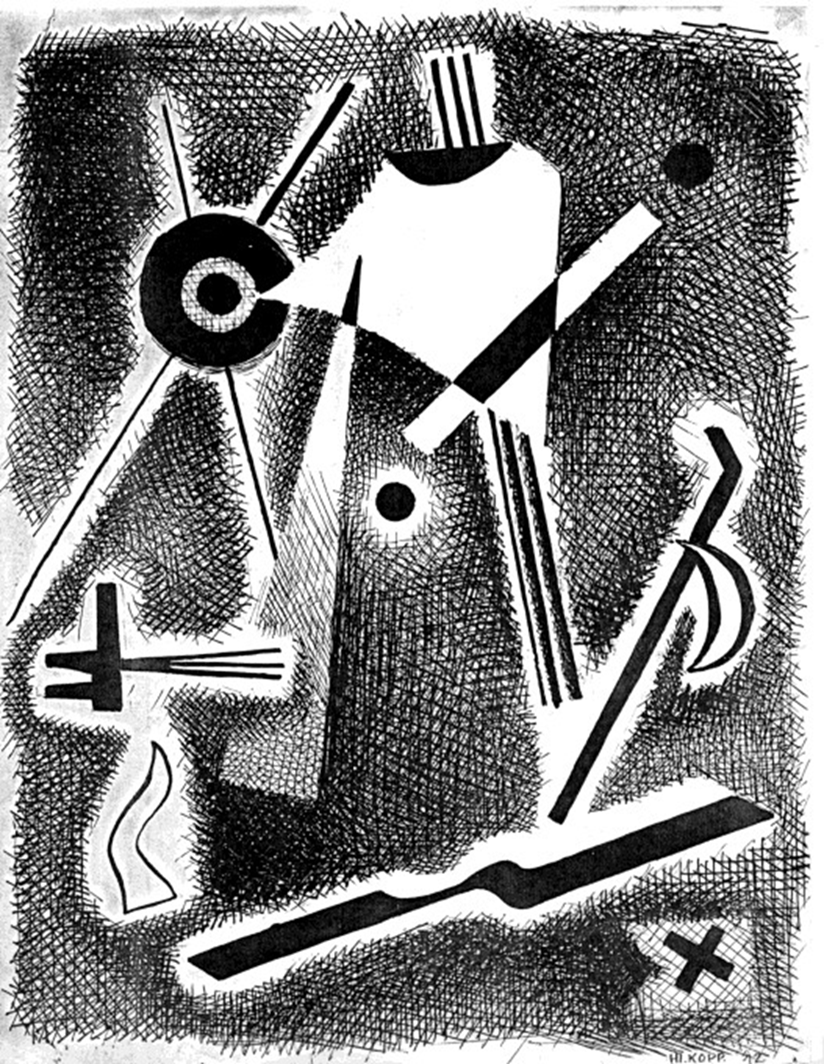
1941, Untitled Guggenheim Collection

Chaim Koppelman was born in Brooklyn, New York City, to Sam and Sadie Koppelman, whose images appear in several of his works. At the age of 9, he drew a profile of Napoleon in a geography book, and images of the Emperor would reappear throughout his long career. He began his study of art in Works Progress Administration (WPA) classes at the Brooklyn Museum in 1936, and continued at Brooklyn College, the Educational Alliance, and the American Artists School. He studied sculpture with William Koss, abstract painting with Carl Holty, and lithography with Eugene Morley. At the Art Students League, he studied sculpture with Jose de Creeft and etching with Martin Lewis and Will Barnet.

In the early 1940s Koppelman worked at the Museum of Non-Objective Painting on 54th Street in Manhattan (which later became the Guggenheim Museum) with, among others, Jackson Pollock, Robert De Niro, Sr., Rolph Scarlett, Lucia Autorino, and Ward Jackson. Two of his early, abstract pen and ink drawings are in the Guggenheim collection. The first recorded exhibition of Koppelman's work was held in the Lounge Gallery of the Eighth Street Playhouse in 1942, and included drawings, paintings, and sculpture. The following year, he had a solo exhibition at the Outlines Gallery in Pittsburgh.

== Aesthetic Realism and artistic development ==
In 1940 Koppelman began attending poetry classes with Eli Siegel, the American poet and critic who first came to national attention in 1925, when his poem, "Hot Afternoons Have Been in Montana" won the esteemed poetry prize of The Nation. This poem, Siegel later stated, arose from a way of seeing that in 1941 became Aesthetic Realism, the philosophy that reality is aesthetic, and that "The resolution of conflict in self is like the making one of opposites in art." In Koppelman's opinion, Siegel was "the most important philosopher of the 20th century – perhaps of all time".

In Aesthetic Realism classes and lessons, Koppelman learned that ethical problems are also artistic problems. He felt his work suffered from a fight between rigidity and flexibility. He learned he could go after precision in the studio as penance for being careless at other times, wanting to get away from things. As freedom and order, truth and imagination became more integrated in his life, his art became more imaginative. "I had always had a classical bent in my work," he wrote. "But there was also a wildness in me that had not come into my work sufficiently or gracefully." As a result of his study, Koppelman noted, "Tightness and abandon, the classical and the wild, even the conservative and the rebel seemed to be working better together" resulting in art that was "more imaginative, freer in concept". Boldness of imagination and an unerring sense of detail were two qualities Koppelman's work became noted for.

He also learned that art does not arise from suffering or depression, but rather from the hope to respect and honestly like the world by seeing opposites as one. This, according to Aesthetic Realism, is the deepest desire of every person, but it is opposed by the desire for contempt—the false notion that one adds to self by lessening the value of other things. Koppelman's art is permeated with his understanding of this conflict. His works are often allegories which point to the discrepancy between, and the need to integrate, opposites such as pride and humility, generosity and selfishness, idealism and cynicism. "That art could be a vehicle for understanding individual behavior seems always to have inspired Koppeman's creative process" wrote John B. Ravenal of the Virginia Museum of Fine Arts, noting that his works "offer intimate rendering of closely observed detail, by which, paradoxically, they evoke universal truths".

Siegel: There is a tendency on your part to separate the deep perception of reality. And one of the things you have to go after is to feel that when you are feeling good you are just as deep as when you are feeling bad. And this I don't think you have felt yet. Take the fight between Delacroix and Ingres. Ingres went after outline and shape and something comparatively restrained, and Delacroix went after much motion and color. Now is that warfare in you?
Koppelman: Yes.
Siegel: It takes many forms. You won't be free about art until your motion, your ripple, your flow is seen as the same as your exactness, your rigidity, your grimness. I think you think you are deepest when you are suffering. Do you see what I mean?

— from an Aesthetic Realism lesson of Chaim Koppelman with Eli Siegel, June 2, 1949
Chaim Koppelman, This Is the Way I See Aesthetic Realism (NY: Terrain Gallery & Definition Press, 1969)

In November 1942, Koppelman was drafted into the United States Army and in 1943 he married painter Dorothy Myers. He worked as a radio weatherman during World War II, guiding ships through the rough waters of the English Channel, which was a critical part of the Invasion of Normandy. He manned an anti-aircraft machine gun in the D-Day landing on Omaha Beach, and later, as staff sergeant, was awarded a Bronze Star. Before the invasion, he had been able to study at the Art College of Western England in Bristol, and later at the École des Beaux-Arts in Reims. While on leave, he visited Picasso's studio in Paris, and it was Picasso and Louis Aragon who told Koppelman that the war in Europe was over. Letters describing his wartime experience are in the Chaim and Dorothy Koppelman papers at the Smithsonian Archives of American Art.

Upon returning to New York, Koppelman continued his study of Aesthetic Realism, and under the G.I. Bill, he studied at the Amédée Ozenfant School and became Ozenfant's assistant. While he continued to exhibit sculpture and drawings, he also began printmaking, a medium which, he said, combines the carving quality of sculpture with the subtleties of light and shade in drawing and painting.

The way etching is both critical and kind, I came to love. It has a digging, critical, biting quality. Yet it can also make for effects of the gentlest lights and shadows. Etching is at once gentle and sharp – and I wanted to put these opposites together in myself. When I take the etching needle in my hand the shifting becomes fixed, the in-between definite, the dim clear, the hidden seen, the teasing full-throated.

— Chaim Koppelman
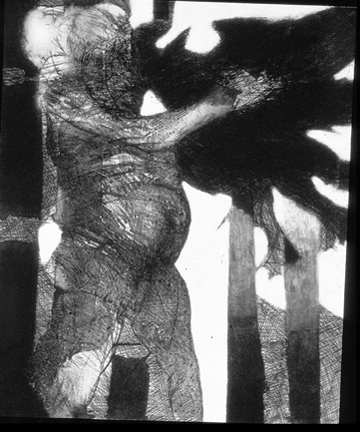
Combat (1958) Aquatint

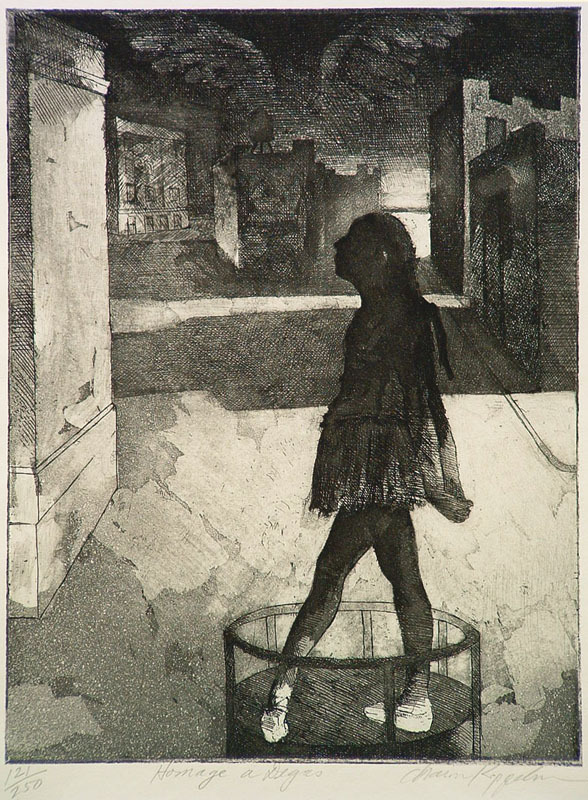
Homage a Degas (1960) Etching/Aquatint

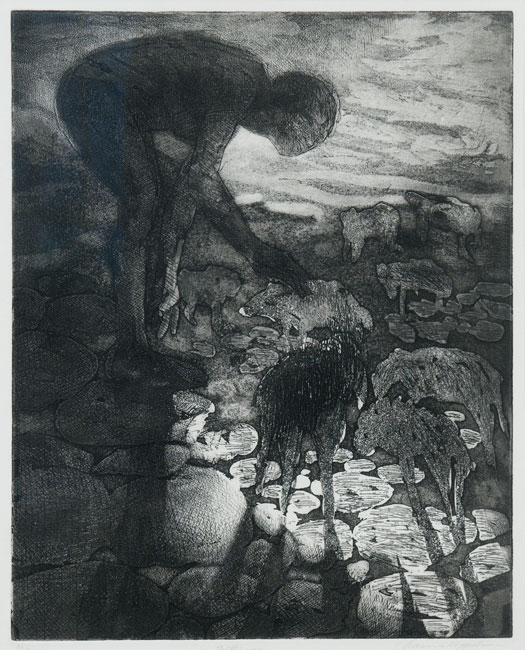
Gentleness (1962) Etching/Aquatint

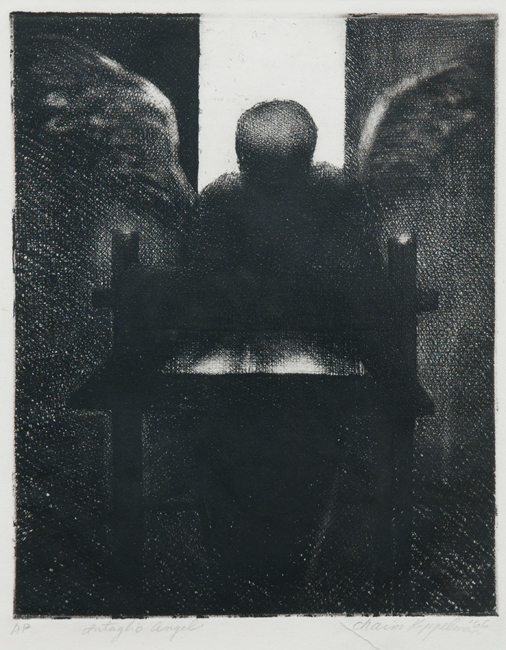
Intaglio Angel (1966) Aquatint

== Influence in the art community ==
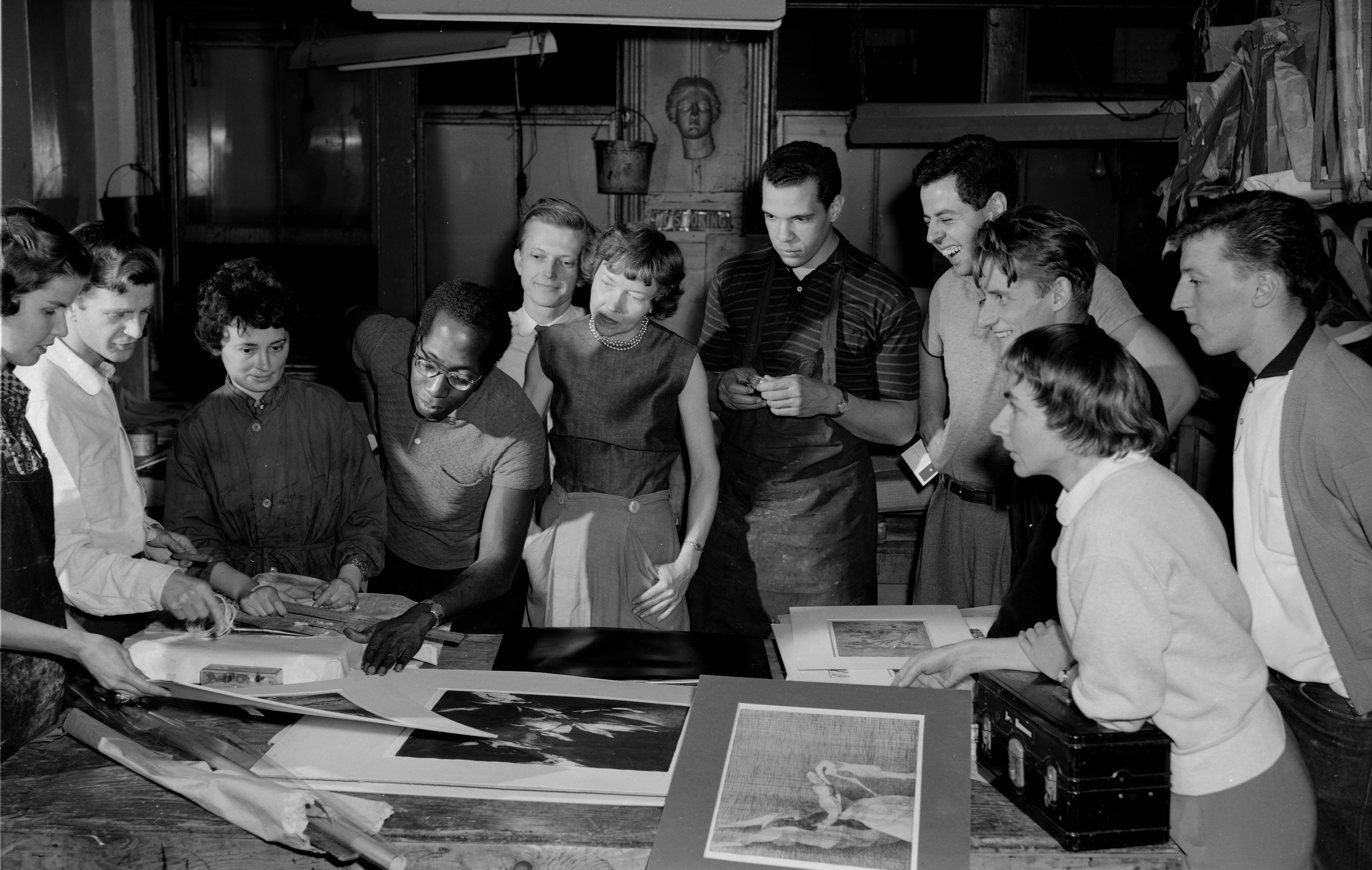
Robert Blackburn workshop, Photo: Lou Dienes, 1959

In the early 1950s Koppelman was part of the Stanley William Hayter Atelier 17 in New York. Later he worked at the Printmaking Workshop founded by Robert Blackburn and Will Barnet. Blackburn credited Koppelman with saving the workshop when it faced financial difficulties in 1956, by transforming it into a seven-member artists cooperative with annual dues to keep its doors open.

Blackburn, Chaim and Dorothy Koppelman, and Leo Katz–the head of Atelier 17 after Hayter–were among the artists who attended Beauty Conferences and Art Inquiries conducted by Eli Siegel, classes in which he discussed current work of contemporary artists with the artists present and participating. "The depth of the discussions that took place," Koppelman later wrote, "encouraged the artists to understand more deeply what their work was about, and what their intention was".

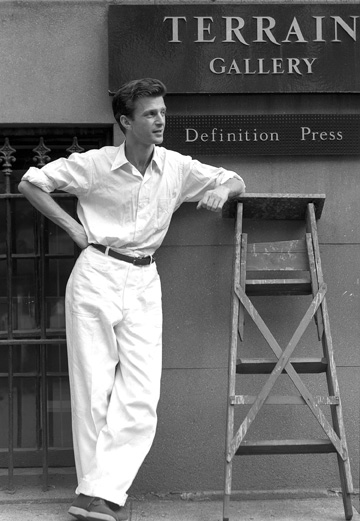
Chaim Koppelman at the Terrain Gallery, NYC, June 1956 Photo: Lou Dienes

In 1955, the Terrain Gallery opened with Dorothy Koppelman as founding director. She and Chaim Koppelman, as print curator, were responsible for major print exhibitions which included the work of Roy Lichtenstein, Claes Oldenburg, Alex Katz, Ad Reinhardt, Fay Lansner, John von Wicht, Leonard Baskin, Robert Conover, Will Barnet, Harold Krisel, Vincent Longo and others. The motto of the Terrain was Siegel's statement: "In reality opposites are one; art shows this." The gallery held exhibitions of contemporary art, with works frequently accompanied by the artists' comments on Siegel's fifteen questions, Is Beauty the Making One of Opposites?, published by the Terrain and reprinted in The Journal of Aesthetics and Art Criticism. After one-person shows at the Terrain, both Chaim and Dorothy Koppelman had work included in the 1962 exhibition "Recent Painting USA: The Figure" at the Museum of Modern Art.

Koppelman opened his own studio and graphic workshop in 1964 at 498 Broome Street, pioneering the SoHo artists' community. The Broome Street Workshop remained open more than forty years, and was used and cared for by various artists, including Michael DiCerbo, Sally Brody, Carl Shishido, Reynolds Tenezias, and others.

Chaim Koppelman is quoted, and his work is included in The Indignant Eye: The Artist as Social Critic in Prints and Drawings from the Fifteenth Century to Picasso, by Ralph E. Shikes. His works are in the collections of the Whitney Museum of American Art and the Brooklyn Museum.

Koppelman was commissioned in 1968 to interview Roy Lichtenstein, Richard Anuszkiewicz, and Clayton Pond on the relevance of the Siegel Theory of Opposites to their work. Recordings of these interviews are part of the Smithsonian Archives of American Art. The following year, essays by Dorothy and Chaim Koppelman appeared in the book, Aesthetic Realism: We Have Been There – Six Artists on the Siegel Theory of Opposites (New York: Definition Press, 1969).

After having tested his aesthetic concepts in literally thousands of works of different periods, in different styles, in different media, for more than twenty years, I say that Eli Siegel's Theory of Opposites is the key to what is good or beautiful in art. I have seen that the greater the work of art, the richer, more surprising and subtle the play and fusion of the opposing qualities in it. In a bad work of art, the opposites are present, but either they fight too much, or they are limply there ... Contempt is the greatest enemy of art ... Contempt, according to Aesthetic Realism, is the difference between what a thing deserves and what we give it ... Beauty can only arise from a mind that is just, wants to see things exactly and give them all the meaning they deserve. You can't switch from contempt outside to respect in the studio, and get away with it.

— Aesthetic Realism: We Have Been There

== Critical reception and awards ==
Koppelman's prints were compared to William Blake and Francisco Goya. ARTnews wrote of his "superb use of allegory." Critics praised his work at the Terrain Gallery, the Kennedy Gallery, the RoKo Gallery, the Brooklyn Museum, the National Academy of Design, and the National Gallery in Washington, D.C. "Koppelman's concern is man, good and evil ... He is a superb technician whose work has grandeur and emotional impact," wrote Bennett Schiff. "Chaim Koppelman brings a totally new concept and technique to the field of graphic art," wrote critic and gallery director Sylvan Cole, Jr. "Siegel's Theory of Opposites has had a profound effect upon his work". Una Johnson, Curator Emeritus of Prints and Drawings at the Brooklyn Museum said, "He has harnessed his skills and his unblinking imagery to the troubled, often controversial problems of our times." Fellow artist Will Barnet said, "He was brilliant, both in printmaking and painting. His work has a sense of darkness and light that is unique ... There was this profundity in him, and this sense of humanity. And it was developed through Aesthetic Realism".

Koppelman received the SAGA Markel Prize in 1956, and Tiffany Grants in 1967 and 1969. He represented the United States in the Documenta II exhibition, Kassel, West Germany in 1969. In the SAGA annual exhibition of 1967, Koppelman's print "Exodus" was awarded the Vera List Prize. The following year, his work was shown and discussed on Channel 31, WNYC-TV. In 1976, he won a New York State CAPS (Creative Artists Public Service) Grant for a suite of lithographs titled Closeness and Clash in Couples and Domestic Life. In 1998, his charcoal drawing "The Dark Angels" won the Gladys Emerson Cook Award for general excellence from the National Academy. In 1992 Koppelman, Blackburn, and Barnet received a New York Artists Equity Award for their dedicated service to the printmaking community. Legends of the Printmaking Workshop, a 2011 exhibition at the LaGrange Museum in Georgia, featured prints of all three artists and Tom Laidman, selected by, and now part of, the collection of Wesley Cochran.,

== Teaching, writing, and later work ==
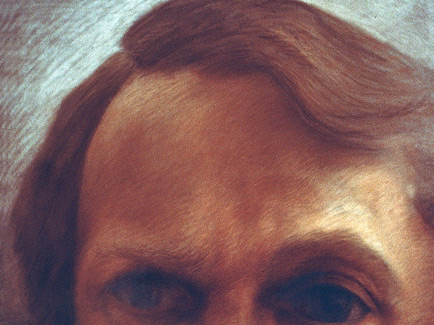
Self Portrait (ca. 1980), personal collection

In 1959, Koppelman began the Printmaking Department at the School of Visual Arts, where he taught until 2007. He also taught at the National Academy, New York University, SUNY New Paltz, the Rhodes Preparatory School, and the 92nd Street Y. In 1971, he became a consultant on the faculty of the not-for-profit Aesthetic Realism Foundation. As part of the trio, The Kindest Art, he gave consultations to artists and others, teaching that art answers the deepest question in life: how to be fully oneself by being fair to the outside world. He taught The Art of Drawing: Surface and Depth. He studied Aesthetic Realism with Eli Siegel until 1978, and then in professional classes with the Chairman of Education, Ellen Reiss.

His scholarly writing as an Aesthetic Realism consultant showing the relation of art and life includes considerations of the lives and works of sculptors Augustus Saint-Gaudens and Jacques Lipchitz; painters René Magritte, Giorgio de Chirico, Henri Matisse, Rembrandt, Fernand Léger, Henri de Toulouse-Lautrec, Masaccio; and many American printmakers. He is the author of The Art of the Print, essays on works of Picasso, Daumier, Munch, Hogarth, and Duane Hanson. His drawings illustrate Siegel's book, Damned Welcome: Aesthetic Realism Maxims (New York: Definition Press, 1972, 2011).

Although known mostly for his work in black and white, Koppelman's painterly interest in color took a new form in the 1970s, when he began using color in his prints. After 1980, he worked increasingly in pastel and watercolor.

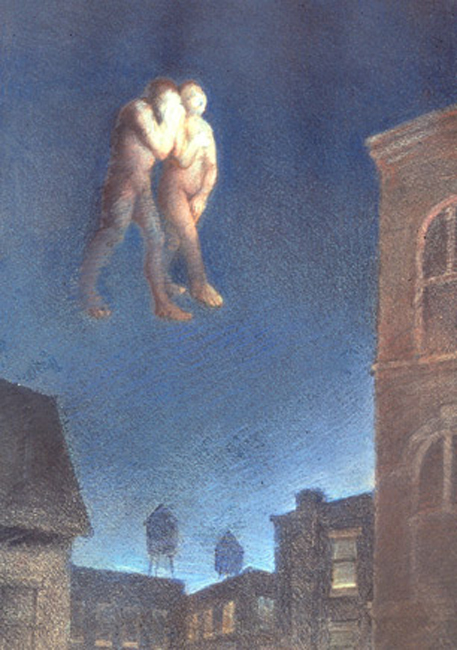
Over SoHo (c. 1970s) Lithograph

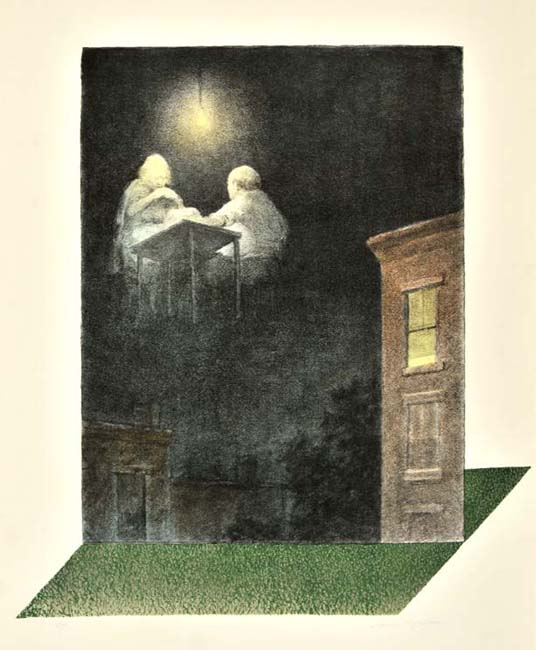
Over Brooklyn (1975) Lithograph

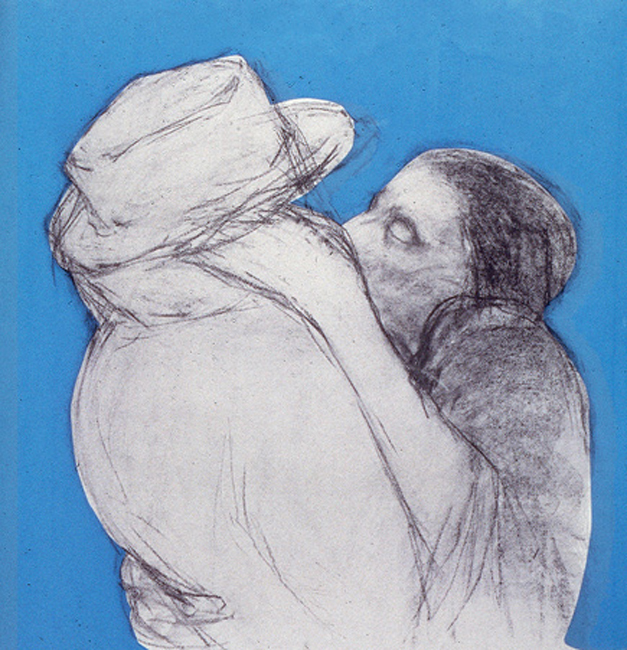
Not There (1976–77) Lithograph

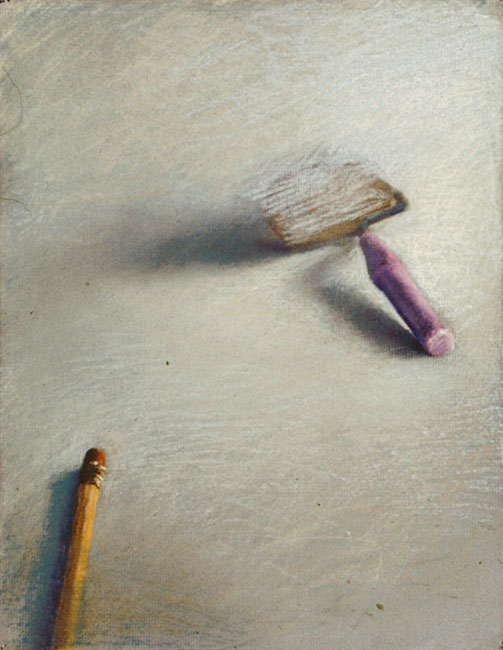
Disquieting Still Life (1978) Pastel

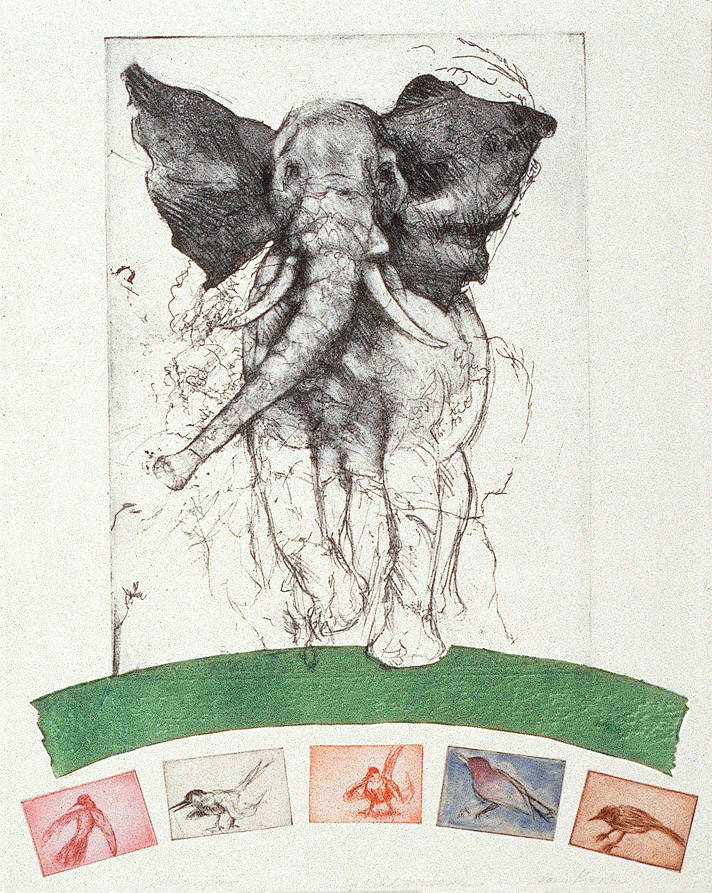
The Kind Messenger (1986) Hand-Colored Etching, Collage
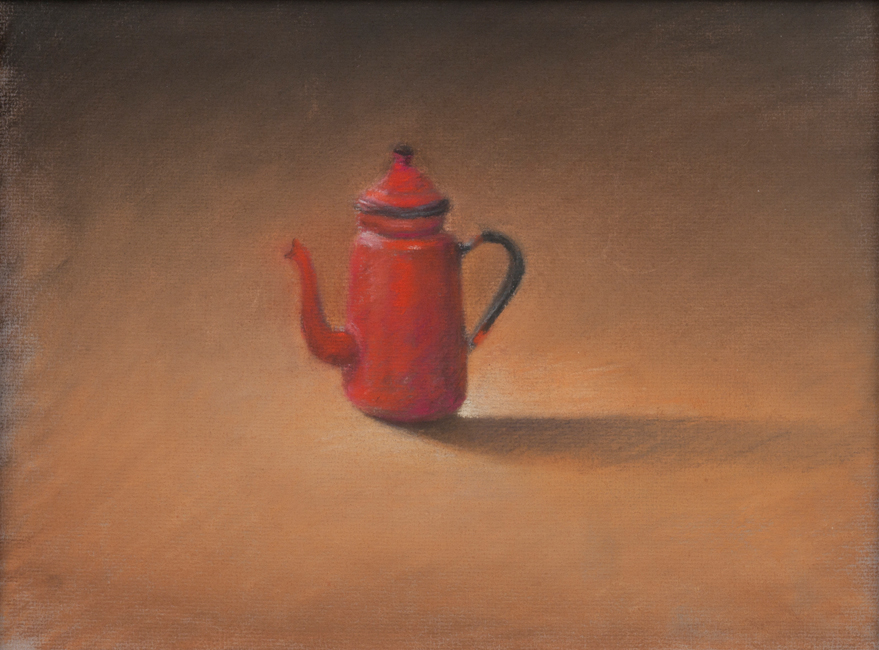
My Red Teapot (1979) Pastel

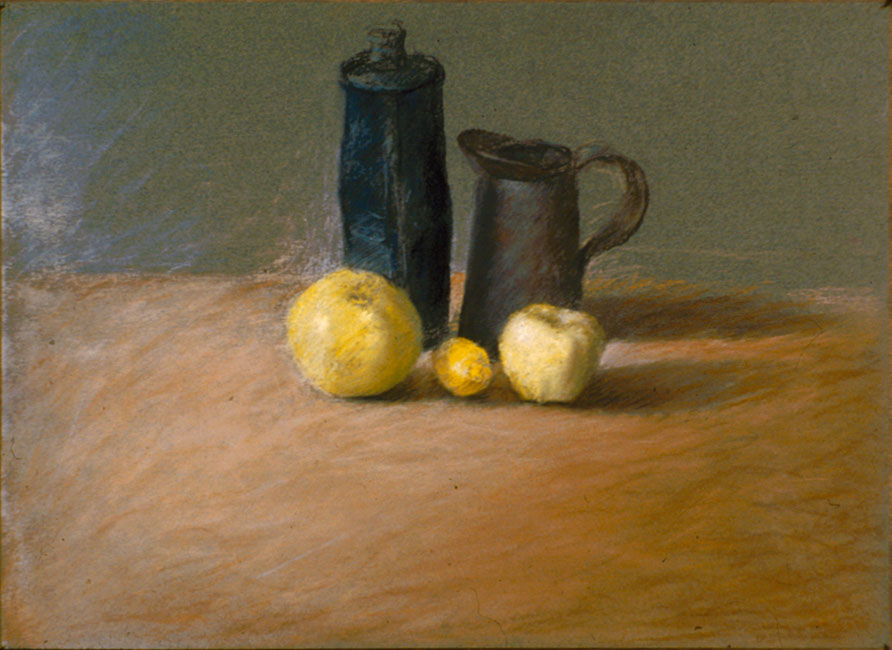
Still Life (n.d.) Pastel

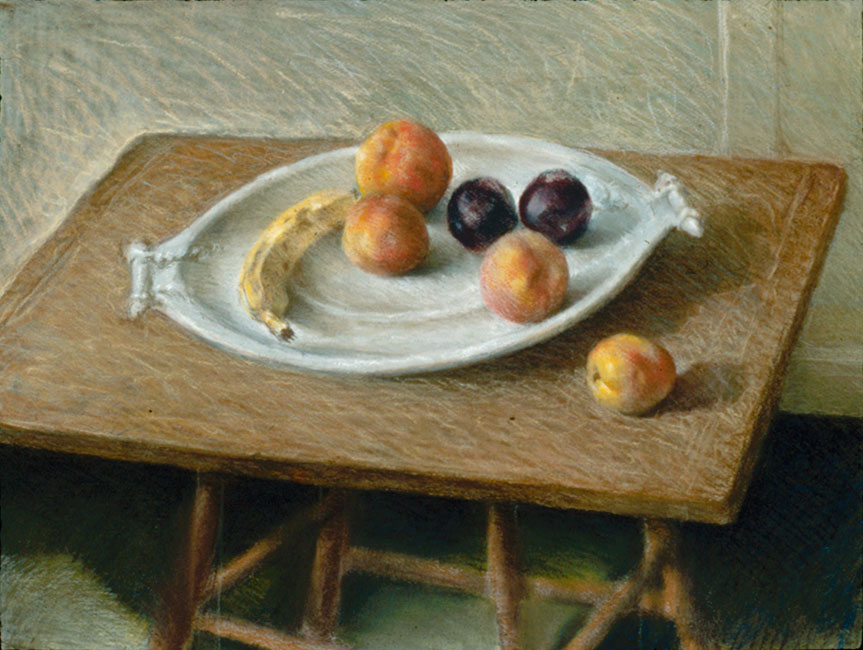
Peaches (1980) Pastel

== Collections and exhibitions ==
Koppelman's work appears in major print collections, including the Museum of Modern Art, the Metropolitan, Whitney, Brooklyn and Guggenheim Museums; Peabody Essex Museum, Yale University Art Gallery, the National Gallery, Pennell Collection-Library of Congress, the Minneapolis Institute of Art, Los Angeles County Museum, the Walker Art Center, the Victoria and Albert Museum in London, the Fine Arts Museum in Anchorage, and the Museum of Fine Arts in Caracas. Both Chaim and Dorothy Koppelman kept "object books" begun in 1949, containing sketches of ordinary objects along with, at the suggestion of Eli Siegel, three descriptive sentences about each object. These sketches and notes continued to the year 2000, and some volumes are among the Chaim and Dorothy Koppelman papers in the Archives of American Art collection of the Smithsonian Institution.

In 2000, a retrospective exhibition of Koppelman's works on paper was held at the Beatrice Conde gallery. Chaim Koppelman died on December 6, 2009, of natural causes at Beth Israel Medical Center in Manhattan, New York City. A memorial exhibition spanning seven decades of his work was held at the Terrain Gallery in 2010.

== Museo Napoleonico exhibit ==
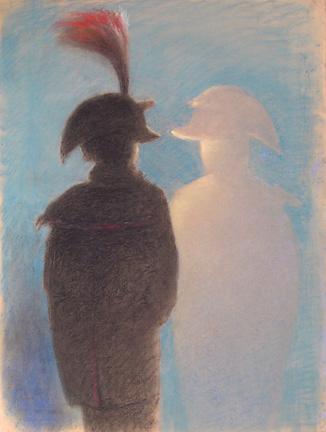
Meeting (2007) Pastel

Throughout Koppelman's long career, the image of Napoleon is recurrent, and a retrospective exhibition of over eighty works and studies dealing with Napoleon was held at the Museo Napoleonico in Rome (October 11, 2011 – May 6, 2012). Titled Napoleon Entering New York: Chaim Koppelman and the Emperor, Works 1957–2007, it included paintings, pastels, drawings, collage, watercolors, intaglio etchings, linocuts, and many of the artist's notes on paper. The exhibition also included selections from a lecture Siegel gave in 1951, Napoleon Bonaparte: or, Orderly Energy, which Koppelman had attended and which he credited with inspiring much of the work displayed.

Napoleon had a fierce desire for order, and his desire for order made him very energetic ... Napoleon felt deeply that all men had to do with each other and that the injustices of the past should be changed into something which called forth the abilities of all people. On the one hand we see in him a tremendous desire for democracy, and on the other a tremendous ego, a tremendous desire for power. The confusions ... point to the confusions in us. We want to be welcomed by the masses, yet we want to nourish our selfish souls.

— Eli Siegel
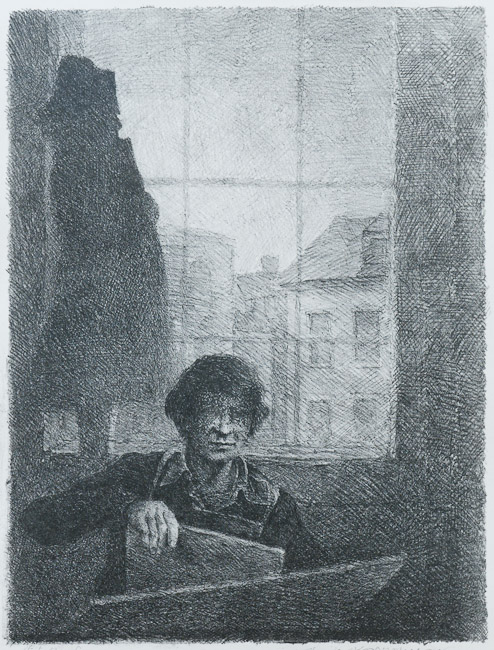
Napoleon and Me (n.d.) Lithograph

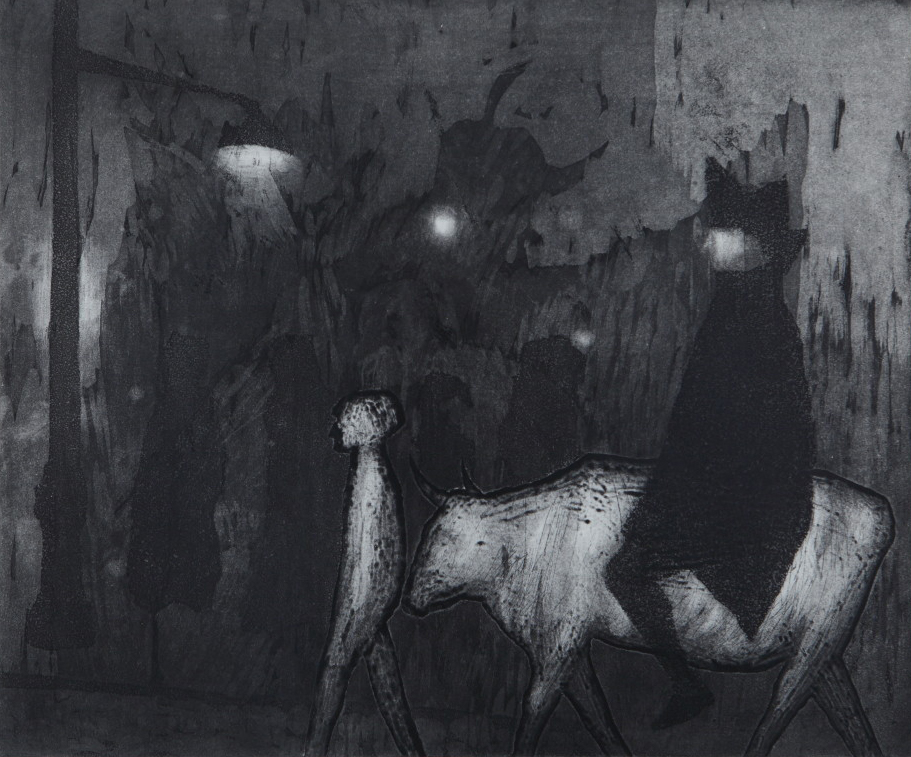
Napoleon Entering New York (c. 1957) Aquatint

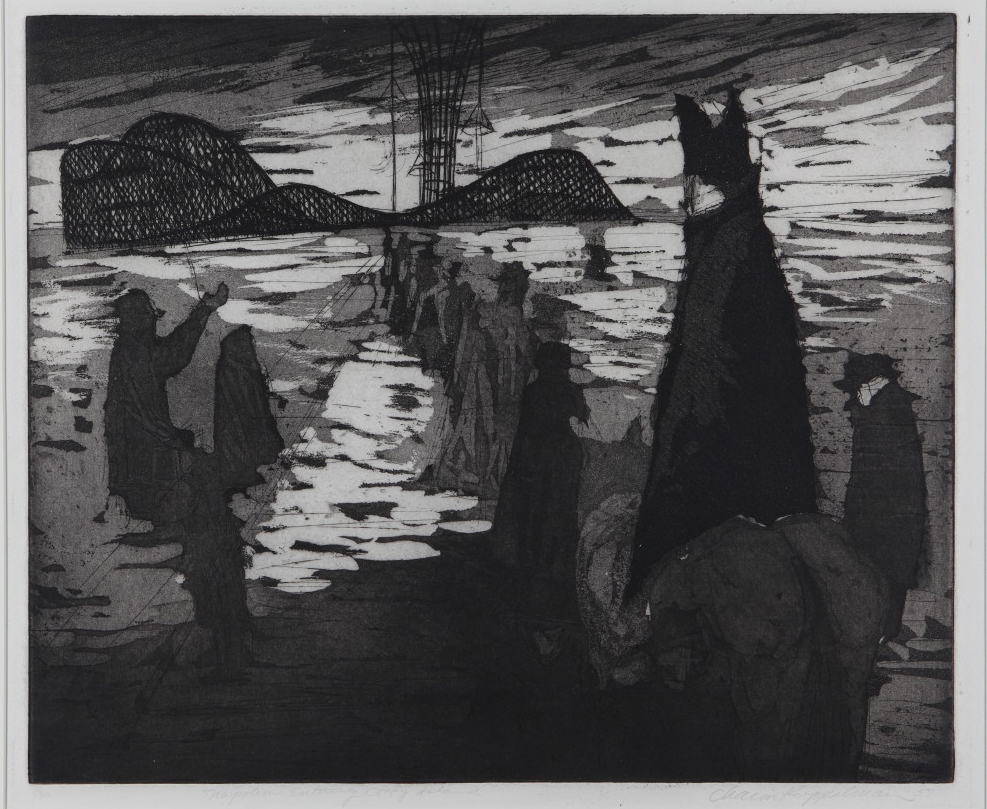
Napoleon Entering Coney Island (1957) Etching

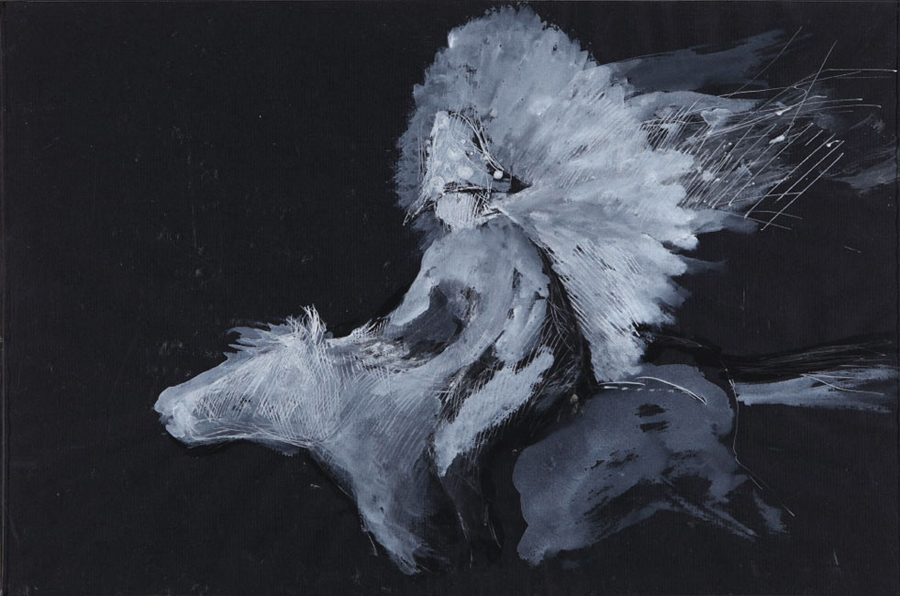
"Napoleon as an Indian" (n.d.) Gouache

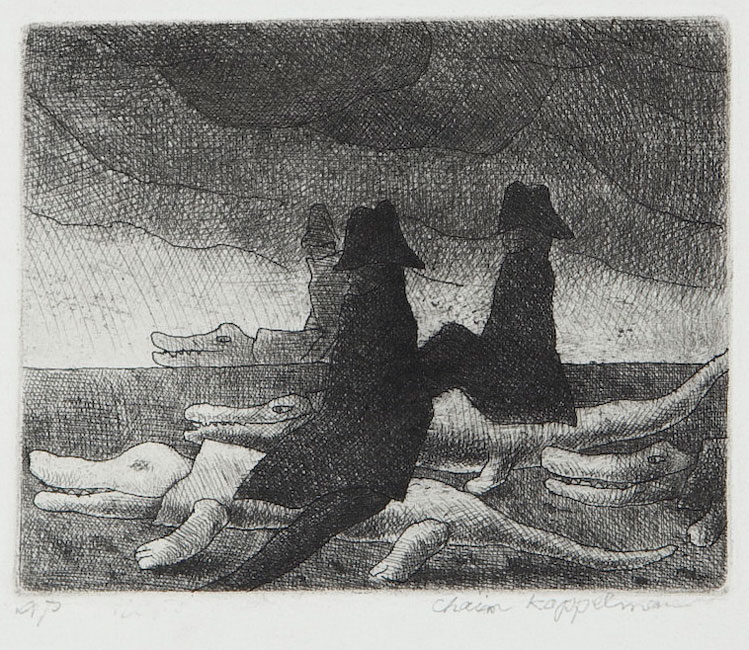
Napoleons on Alligators (1963) Etching

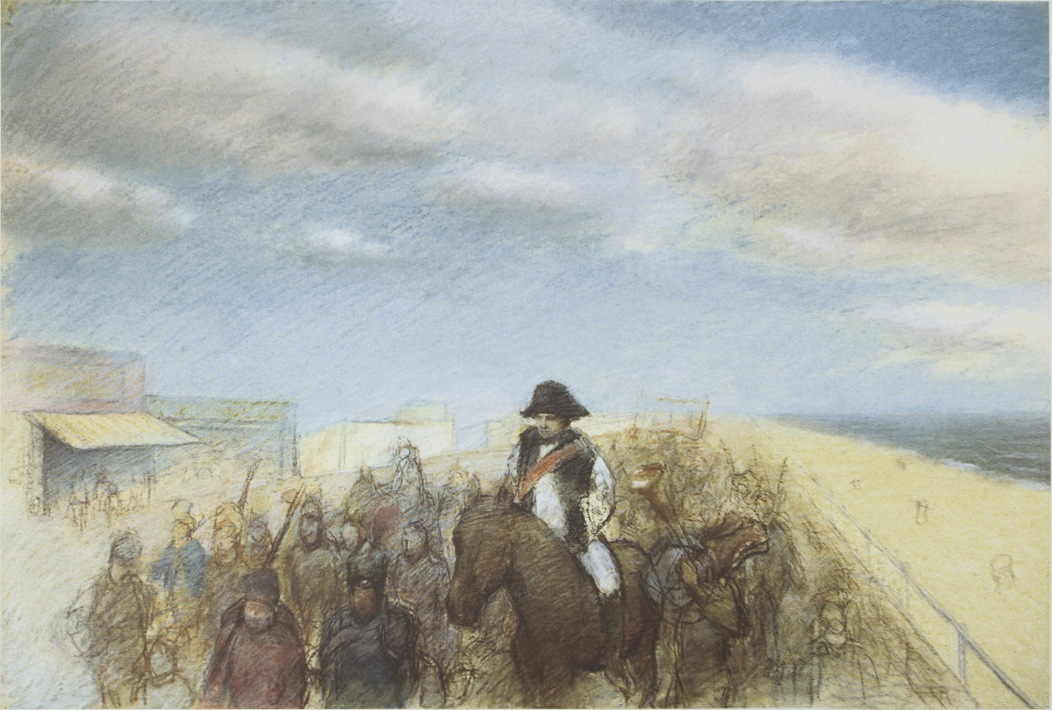
Napoleon Entering Brighton Beach (1981) Pastel

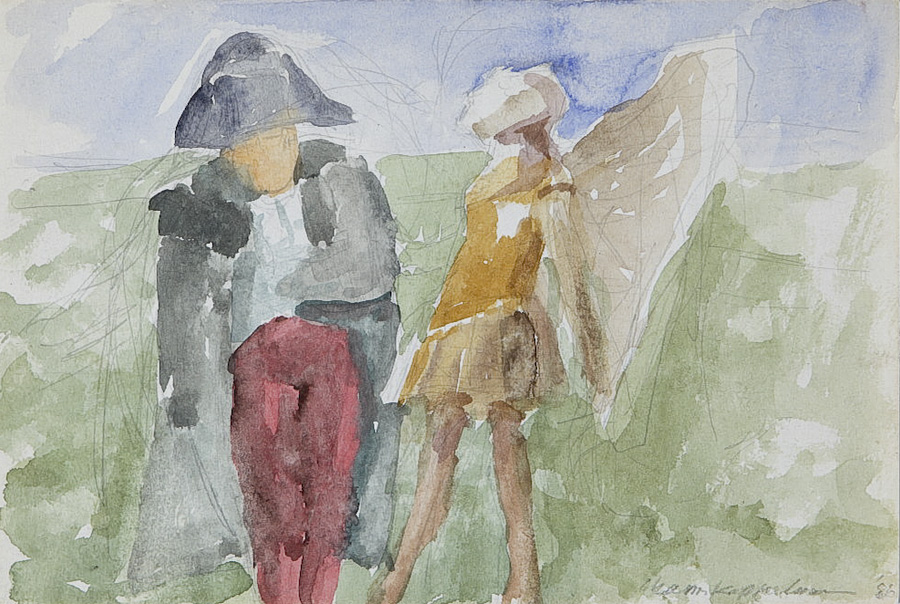
Napoleon and the Little Dancer (n.d.) Watercolor

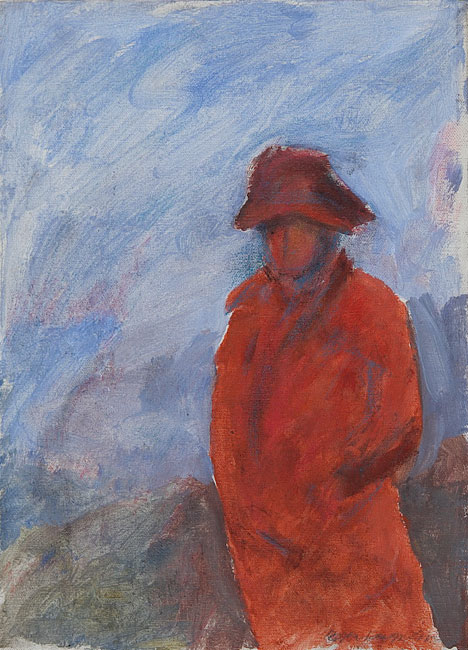
Napoleon Alone (n.d.) Acrylic and Oil Pastel

In his review, "Chaim Koppelman's Napoleon Entering Brighton Beach, Coney Island", artist Richard Sloat, past president of SAGA, wrote: "In his art, Chaim Koppelman was a maker of stories about our inner self. ... For Napoleon to be leading his army in retreat down the boardwalk of Coney Island is a bit heroic, a bit tragic, a bit funny, a bit absurd, but also glorious. Is this not a wonderful metaphor of our living this life?"

In reviewing this exhibition, the Italian daily newspaper, Corriere della Sera described Koppelman as "one of the greatest American printmakers".

== Books and essays ==
- Koppelman, Chaim (1969). This Is the Way I See Aesthetic Realism. New York: Terrain Gallery & Definition Press.
- Koppelman, Chaim (1969). "I Believe This About Art". In Kranz, Sheldon (ed.). Aesthetic Realism: We Have Been There – Six Artists on the Siegel Theory of Opposites. New York: Definition Press. ISBN 978-0-910492-11-9.
- Koppelman, Chaim (2004). Four Essays on the Art of the Print. New York: Orange Angle Press. ISBN 978-0-9759813-0-6. Archived from the original on April 8, 2014.
- Koppelman, Chaim (July 24, 2003). "The Sculpture of Augustus St. Gaudens: Its Meaning for Our Lives". The Southampton Press. ISSN 0745-6484. Archived from the original on January 7, 2015.
