= Nat Herz =

American photographer, poet, and writer

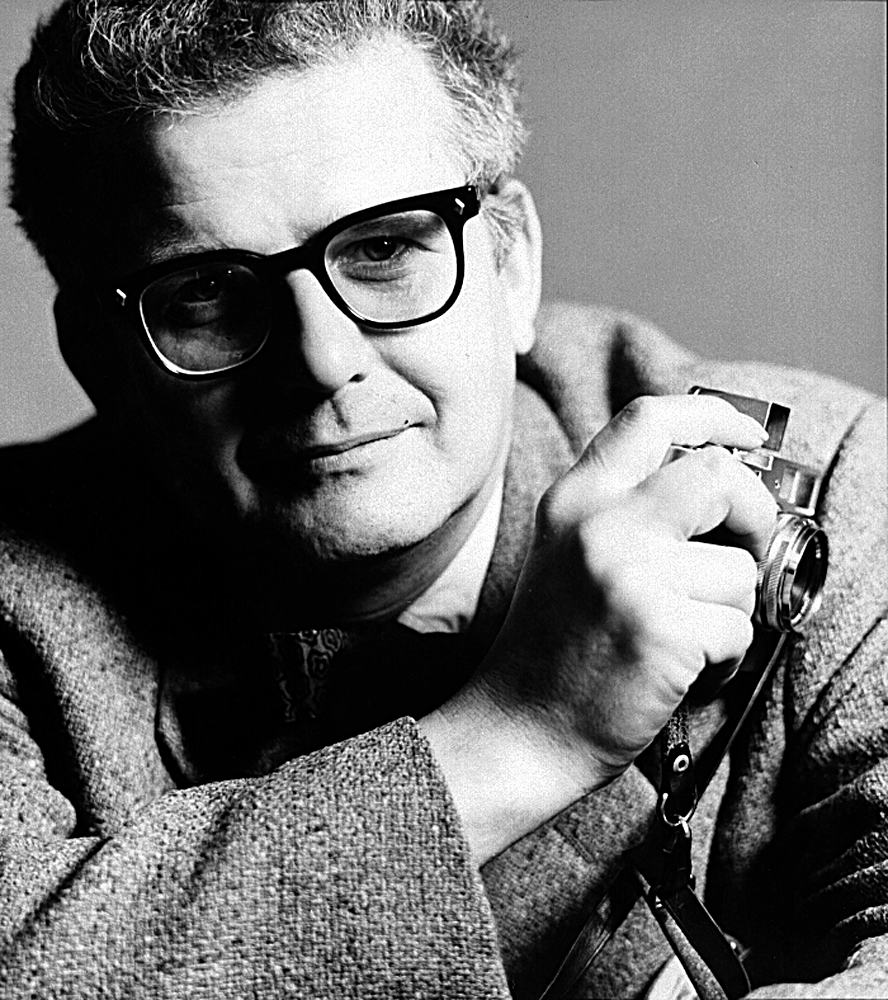
- Born: August 6, 1920; New York City, New York, U.S.
- Died: November 27, 1964
- Occupations: Poet, writer, photographer

Nat Herz (1920–1964) was an American photographer, poet, and writer.

A student of Aesthetic Realism, Herz integrated the philosophy into his artistic practice and daily life after his introduction in 1940 to classes with Eli Siegel, the American poet, critic and founder of Aesthetic Realism. Herz left New York in 1941 to pursue graduate studies under Austin Warren at the University of Iowa, but returned shortly thereafter to resume his study of poetry under the guidance of Siegel, later stating that he "learned more about poetry from Eli Siegel [in] New York than I ever learned in Iowa from anyone, including Austin Warren."

While supporting himself as a licensed practical nurse, Herz fostered a second career as a photographer and writer. Herz held the roles of writer, picture researcher, and editor for Life Magazine, picture editor for the Blue Network, and chairman of the Infinity editorial board. Friends and colleagues of Herz included André Kertész, Dorothea Lange, Wynn Bullock, Lou Bernstein, Norman Rothschild, Leonora Carrington, Kurt Seligmann, and Chaim Koppelman.

A dedicated civil rights activist, Herz spent time extensively documenting the events of the March on Washington for Jobs and Freedom in an unpublished manuscript, With the March on Washington for Jobs and Freedom, August 28, 1963: Impressions of America on Its Way. Herz's photographs of the march have been used to illustrate the historical moment in several publications, including The Civil Rights Movement: A Photographic History, written by Stephen Kasher.

A collection of Herz's poetry was published in 1964 in the book Personal and Impersonal 6: Aesthetic Realism. In 1965, Herz wrote the introduction to What's There: An Aesthetic Realism Art Inquiry, a text which chronicled an interview between Eli Siegel and various artists, including Lou Bernstein, Chaim Koppelman, Dorothy Koppelman, Louis Dienes, Anne Fielding, Warren Rhodes, and Martha Baird. Herz's publications credits also include the Konica Pocket Handbook, published in 1960, as well as numerous photographs and articles in various periodicals, including Infinity, The Sunday Herald Tribune, Popular Photography, and TV Guide.

== Exhibitions ==
Herz's work in photography has been exhibited in many group and solo shows in America and abroad. Notable exhibitions include a 1961 solo photography show, Color Statement, at the Terrain Gallery in New York City, and an exhibition of Herz's poetic collaborative with Surrealist artist Kurt Seligmann, Impossible Landscapes of the Mind, at the Hirschl and Adler Galleries in 1999. In 1994, images from Herz's With the March on Washington for Jobs and Freedom, August 28, 1963: Impressions of America on Its Way were shown in exhibition at the Howard Greenberg Gallery in New York.
