= Aesthetic realism (disambiguation) =

Aesthetic Realism is a philosophy founded by Eli Siegel in 1941.

Aesthetic realism may also refer to:

- Aesthetic realism (arts), the attempt to represent subject matter truthfully without artificiality
- Aesthetic realism (metaphysics), the claim that there are mind-independent aesthetic facts
