= Hot Afternoons Have Been in Montana: Poems =

First edition

Hot Afternoons Have Been in Montana: Poems is a book of poems written by Eli Siegel, founder of the philosophy of Aesthetic Realism. It was one of 13 finalists in the poetry category of the National Book Award in 1958, the year its author was nominated for the Pulitzer Prize for Poetry.

The title poem first received national attention in 1925, when it won The Nation's esteemed annual poetry prize. The magazine's editors described it as "the most passionate and interesting poem which came in—a poem recording through magnificent rhythms a profound and important and beautiful vision of the earth on which afternoons and men have always existed." "In Hot Afternoons," Siegel later explained, "I tried to take many things that are thought of usually as being far apart and foreign and to show, in a beautiful way, that they aren't so separate and that they do have a great deal to do with one another." The poem begins:

Quiet and green was the grass of the field,
The sky was whole in brightness,
And O, a bird was flying, high, there in the sky,
So gently, so carelessly and fairly.
Here, once, Indians shouted in battle,
And moaned after it.
Here were cries, yells, night, and the moon over these men,
And the men making the cries and yells; it was
Hundreds of years ago, when monks were in Europe,
Monks in cool, black monasteries, thinking of God, studying Virgil...

For the full text of this poem see aestheticrealism.net.
The poem has been translated into Italian and French . In 2005 it was made into an award-winning film in 2005 by Ken Kimmelman.

After the publication of the title poem in 1925, the author devoted much of his time to developing the philosophy of Aesthetic Realism. Consequently, Hot Afternoons Have Been in Montana: Poems was the first volume of his poems to be published. It contained, among other poems, what has been called "the shortest poem in the English language," a two-word poem which first appeared in the Literary Review of the New York Evening Post in 1925, although it was later anthologized without proper attribution to the author. The poem is:

One Question
I —
Why?

Hot Afternoons Have Been in Montana: Poems includes a letter written in 1951 by William Carlos Williams to Martha Baird, the wife of Eli Siegel, in which Dr. Williams wrote, "I can't tell you how important Siegel's work is in the light of my present understanding of the modern poem. He belongs in the very first rank of our living artists." See full text of Williams' 1951 letter.

Reviewing this book of poems in the Saturday Review, Selden Rodman wrote of Eli Siegel, "He comes up with poems like 'Dear Birds, Tell This to Mothers,' 'She's Crazy and It Means Something,' and 'The World of the Unwashed Dish' which say more (and more movingly) about here and now than any contemporary poems I have read." See full text of Rodman's 1957 review.

In 2005, the title poem, as read by the author, was made into an award-winning film by Ken Kimmelman.
