= Richard Artschwager =

American artist (1923–2013)

- Born: Richard Ernst Artschwager; December 26, 1923; Washington, D.C., U.S.
- Died: February 9, 2013 (aged 89); Albany, New York, U.S.
- Known for: Painting; Sculpture
- Movement: Pop Art; Conceptual; Minimalism
- Spouses: Elfriede Wejmelka (m. 1947; div. 1971) Catherine Kord (m. 1972; div. 1989) Molly O'Gorman (div. 1993) Ann Sebring (m. 1995)
- Children: 1 with Elfriede, 2 with Molly

Richard Ernst Artschwager (December 26, 1923 – February 9, 2013) was an American painter, illustrator and sculptor. His work has associations with pop art, conceptual art, and minimalism.

== Early life and art ==
Artschwager was born in Washington, D.C., to European immigrant parents. His father, Ernst Artschwager, was a Protestant botanist born in Prussia, who suffered greatly from tuberculosis. His mother, Eugenia (née Brodsky), an amateur artist and designer who studied at the Corcoran School of Art, was a Jewish Ukrainian. From his mother, Artschwager received his love of art. In 1935, the family moved to Las Cruces, New Mexico, because of his father's deteriorating health. At that time, Artschwager was already showing a talent for drawing.

In 1941, Artschwager entered Cornell University, where he studied chemistry and mathematics. In the fall of 1944, he enlisted in the United States Army and deployed to England and France to fight in World War II. Wounded in the head, he was assigned administrative duty in Frankfurt, where he moved high-level prisoners across the continent. Among them was Nikolaus von Falkenhorst, a German general whom he brought to Oslo to be put on trial by the Norwegians for war crimes. Artschwager was later assigned to an intelligence posting in Vienna. It was there that he met his wife, Elfriede Wejmelka. The two married in 1946 and returned to the United States in 1947. Artschwager then returned to college and, in February 1948, graduated with a Bachelor of Arts in physics.

Artschwager, however, could not deny his first passion and was encouraged to pursue the arts by his wife. After he received his diploma, the couple moved to New York City, where he worked as a baby photographer and his wife as a designer.

In 1949, taking advantage of the GI Bill, Artschwager began to study with Amédée Ozenfant in Paris for a year. Ozenfant was a purist painter. Purism was a Cubist movement in which objects were represented as elementary forms devoid of detail. In the early 1950s, Artschwager abandoned art to work at various jobs, particularly as a turner and a bank employee. In 1953, he began to sell furniture, to ensure regular income, after the birth of his daughter. In 1956, he designed and manufactured simple and modern furniture. His work as a furniture maker left its mark on the art he would later create, as a 1960 commission from the Catholic Church to build portable altars for ships inspired him to start producing small wall objects made of wood and Formica. He was quite successful until 1958, when a fire destroyed his entire studio and all its contents. He then took out a large loan to restore his business.

== Work ==
=== Return to art ===
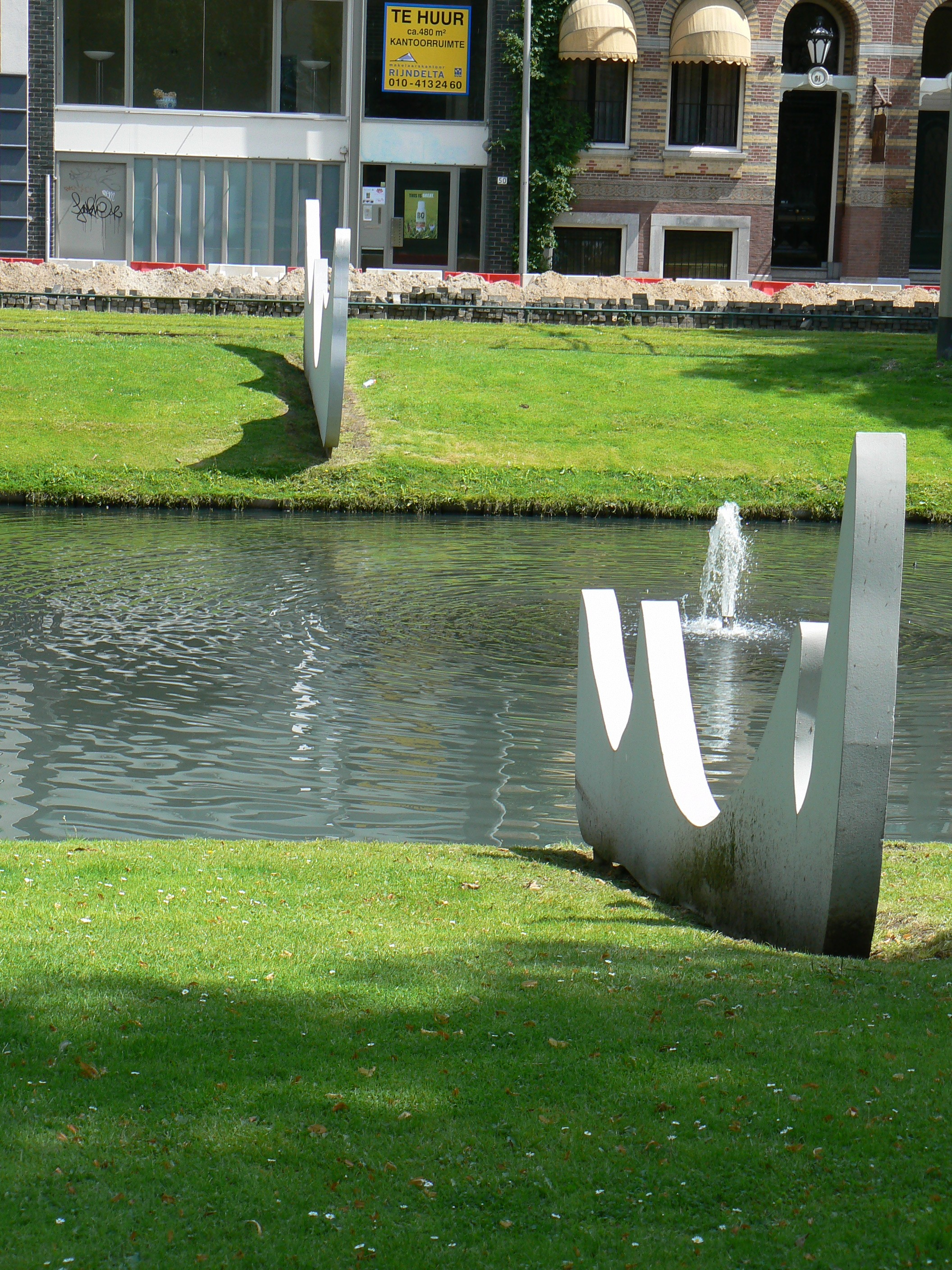
Works by Richard Artschwager in Rotterdam

While he was working to support his family, Artschwager continued to think about art. This was during a time when abstract expressionism reigned supreme. He enrolled in a workshop concentrating upon the nude and painted in the abstract easel format, derived from landscape painting. His paintings and drawings from this period were exhibited in two group shows at the Terrain Gallery in 1957 and in October 1959 at the Art Directions Gallery on Madison Avenue, where they were recognized by Donald Judd.

In 1960, Artschwager received a commission from the Catholic Church to construct portable altars for ships. This led him to consider how to transcend the utilitarianism of tables, chairs, and cabinets, and to seek a mode of artistic expression more consistent with his identity as a craftsman. During this period, he built a series of small wall objects in wood and Formica, a decorative staple of American kitchens.

In 1961, he took a snapshot of a dustbin. The quadrille photo was implemented and expanded on the canvas. Shortly after seeing a painting by Franz Kline, Artschwager discovered Celotex, a rough-textured fiberboard used on ceilings as acoustic paneling, as a medium to enhance the load gesture. Handle (1962) was the breakthrough piece. A rectangle 4 feet wide and 30 inches high is crafted from a cylinder of honed and polished wood. Although three-dimensional like a sculpture, it hangs on the wall like a painting, only enclosing a view of the wall behind it. That same year, he directed his first combination work, using painting and Celotex sculpture (Portrait I and Portrait II). Also from 1962 Artschwager painted grey acrylic monochrome pictures, basing his images on black-and-white photographs, characteristically of modern buildings as shown in property advertisements, as in Apartment House (1964).

At the end of 1963, Artschwager was very productive. Chair, a substitute geometric version, is a work very representative of this period, with the red Formica used to mimic the back rest.

In the mid-'60s, Artschwager made small framed objects from Formica. He sought to incorporate, for the first time, human presence into his sculptures. His paintings on Celotex during this period show essentially opposite characters. His diptychs show his first attempt to incorporate space in the table. From 1964, his paintings depict images of the environment, carefully framed with Formica. He met gallerist Leo Castelli and his gallery director Ivan Karp and, who appreciated his work and exhibited it in group exhibitions during the spring and autumn of 1964.

== First exhibits ==
In his work Artschwager explored problems of perception of space via more elaborate construction and decoration. He also worked with portable altars. In 1965, the keyboard he had played since his childhood, appeared in his work as an installation format architecture. Artschwager's efforts to animate the space became increasingly sophisticated. He exploited the traditional functions and duties of furniture in space. Throughout the 1960s, he produced many figurative paintings from photographs. He integrated time and movement in his paintings and then used perspective as a convention to create the illusion of space.

In 1966, he inaugurated a series using mottled brown Formica, a series that was the subject of his second solo exhibit at Castelli Gallery in late 1967. His original works of furniture were becoming more advanced, especially through his wall pieces. At the same time, he continued to produce many abstract paintings, which used spatial concerns marbled wall furniture. He drew a series of landscapes, which he used to prepare an exhibit commissioned by the University of California, Davis in the spring of 1968. He used them in four basic forms of wood painted nois, as space punctuation: the birth of what the artist called "blps" (a term which has been attributed to dots seen on the screen of a military submarine), which were enlargements of punctuation marks produced in such media as wood, horsehair, and paint that embody the artist's growing taste for linguistic references. The blps were the sole subject of his first solo exhibit in Europe at the Konrad Fischer Gallery in Düsseldorf in 1968.

At the end of 1968, he participated in the annual exhibit of sculpture at the Whitney Museum of American Art. The dispersed installation art work, called 100 Locations, put blps in a hundred different places throughout the museum, which drew attention to the brutalist architecture of Marcel Breuer and the works exhibited. They were used to publicly question the institutional context of art.

In 1969, Artschwager self-published an edition of blown glass sculptures, each unique, that he called Glass Drops. Of making these works, Artschwager said "You take your tube, dip the end of the tube into the glass and you get a gob there - it's still hot, it's still fluid, it's still plasma - and then you start to blow into that and turn it. You turn the pipe and you heat it up a little and you turn it a little more and then it's pretty well set up like a dumpling and then you cut it off and then it's an entity""

In 1970, he participated in the group exhibit Information at The Museum of Modern Art.

=== Architectural works ===
In the 1970s, Artschwager began to work on architectural motifs. During the first half of the decade, he employed two processes—fragmentation and expansion. His theme was domestic interiors. He also included associations of various styles of furniture, gradually moving away from the rudimentary nature of them.

During the years 1971, 1972 and 1973, he explored the theme of very bourgeois interiors, which gave him a sense of stability while working on other paintings during this time of instability. Artschwager included the dissolution of any visual design on six Celotex paintings in 1972, which depicted the explosive demolition of Traymore Hotel in Atlantic City using photographic reporting.

In 1974, he developed classic architectural motifs, a compromise between the stillness of the interiors and the ongoing disintegration of destruction. The subject here is light, its ability to guide the eye, the movement's vision and the constant movement and fluid look. A series of imaginary drawings, representing all six items combined (a door, a window, a table, a basket, mirror, rug), uses inversions of scale, imaginative combinations and locations. This reflection on the spaces capable of containing all six, which is also a question about the context, causes them to turn again to the blps.

For the next five years, his production was essentially three-dimensional. He added to his works very large blps.

In the 1980s, there was preponderance of the mirror as object-own furniture to accommodate the reflections, possibly combined with other materials like Celotex, painted wood, and Formica.

In 1984 and 1985, he used painted wood and remained very active. This design occupies a central place in his creative process.

=== Late work ===
From about 1986 to the late 1990s, Artschwager, like many artists, employed studio assistants. The crew could number as few as three or as many as 15, expanding for large scale projects such as the construction of an evergreen tree, for the Chazen Museum of Art in Wisconsin (then known as the Elvehjem Museum of Art). In the 1990s Artschwager made an extensive series of sculptures in the form of shipping crates. Of Artschwager's body of work and recent shows, art critic John Yau notes that the artist has always been "interested in domesticity—tables, chairs—right from the first things ... paintings that were about interiors, houses, but always domesticity was held at a kind of arm's length, and now it seems to me something changed in this most recently completed body of work, which has people in it; it's a different view of domesticity and time."

Artschwager's "Osama" painting of Osama bin Laden was included in his 2003 exhibition at Gagosian Gallery in London, however, it was not reproduced in the catalog because of its “potentially politically incendiary nature.” The painting was reproduced in a French catalog from Domaine de Kerguehennec (2003) opposite a portrait of George W. Bush.

His final gallery exhibition in late 2012 at the Gagosian Gallery in Rome featured five laminate sculptures of upright and grand pianos. Utilizing the Formica patterns to make references to early 20th-century artists as diverse as Kazimir Malevich and Henri Matisse, they also made a retrospective nod to his first piano sculpture in 1965.

== Exhibitions ==
Artschwager began to be included in group exhibitions and had his first solo exhibition as a mature artist at Leo Castelli Gallery in January 1965. Between 1986 and 1998 Mary Boone showed his work. He was later represented by Xavier Hufkens and Gagosian Gallery. His first Los Angeles solo exhibition was at Eugenia Butler Gallery in 1970.

In 1979, the Albright-Knox Art Gallery in Buffalo, New York, staged the first major survey of his work that later traveled to Institute of Contemporary Art, Philadelphia; Contemporary Arts Museum, Houston; and La Jolla Museum of Contemporary Art, California, through 1980. In 1982, the Van Buren/Brazelton/Cutting Gallery in Cambridge, MA put on a show of his drawings from the "Door Window Table Basket Mirror Rug" series. The Whitney Museum of American Art produced its second Artschwager retrospective in 1988–89, at the time he had been linked to the new Neo-Geo movement. It later traveled to San Francisco, Los Angeles, Madrid, Paris and Düsseldorf. Artschwager's work has since been the subject of many important surveys, including the Centre Pompidou, Paris (1989); Neues Museum, Nuremberg, Germany (2001, traveled to Serpentine Gallery, London); Museum of Applied Arts, Vienna (2002); Museum of Contemporary Art, North Miami (2003); Deutsche Guggenheim, Berlin (2003); Kunstmuseum Winterthur (2003), and Kent Fine Art (2004). The artist also participated in numerous group shows, such as documenta (1968, 1972, 1982, 1987, 1992) and at the Venice Biennale. His second retrospective, “Richard Artschwager!” was organized by Jennifer Gross at the Yale University Art Gallery and opened at the Whitney Museum in 2012, travelling to Hammer Museum, Los Angeles; Haus der Kunst, Munich; and Nouveau Musée National de Monaco until 2014.

== Collections ==
Artschwager's work is included in many museum collections worldwide, including the Museum of Modern Art, New York; Art Institute of Chicago; Museum Ludwig, Cologne; Museum für Moderne Kunst, Frankfurt; Lehmbruck Museum, Duisburg; Kunstmuseum Basel; and Fondation Cartier pour l'Art Contemporain, Paris.

== Legacy ==
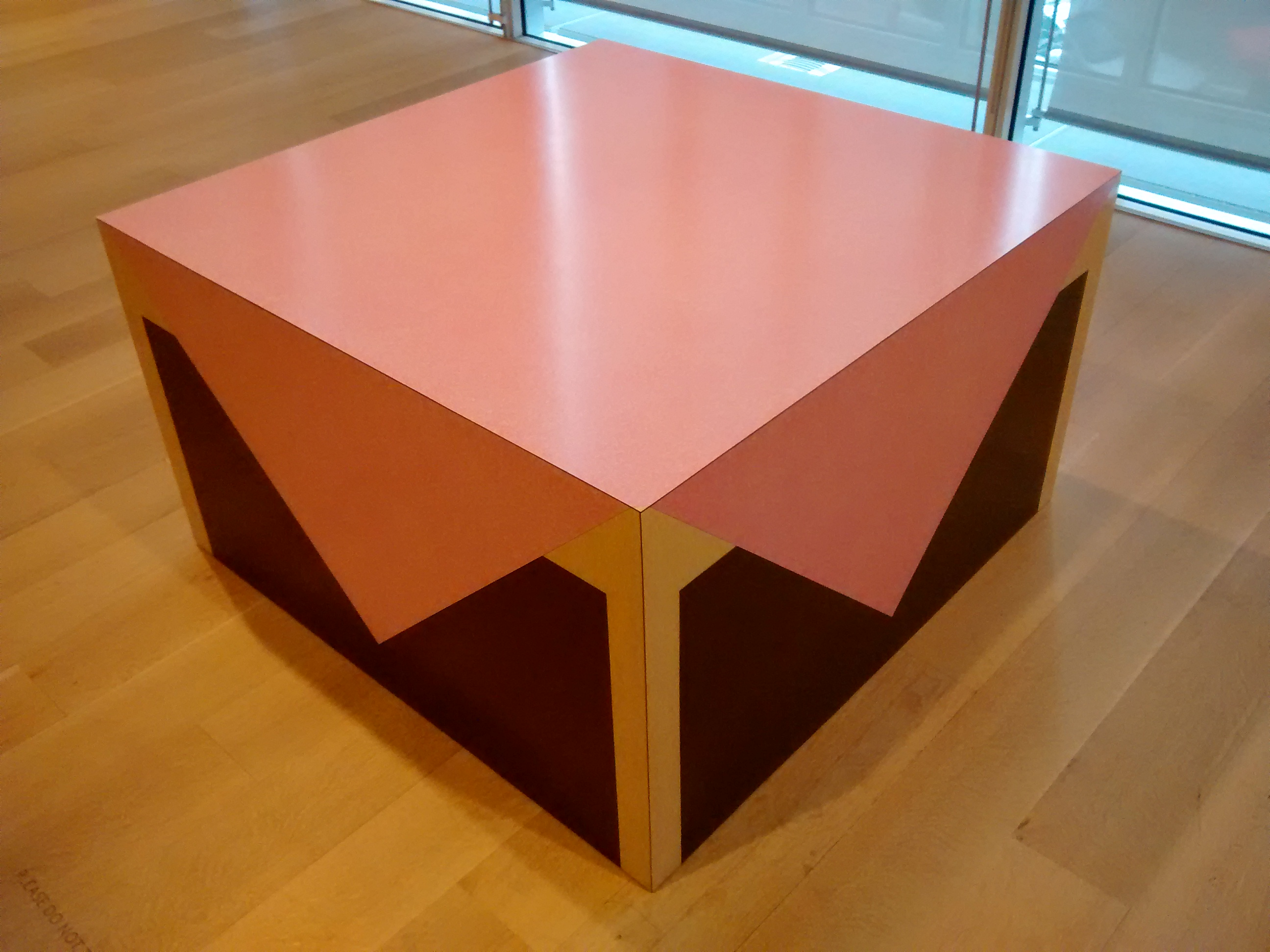
Table with Pink Tablecloth on display at the Art Institute of Chicago

Artschwager has been credited with influencing 1980s artists like Haim Steinbach, Meyer Vaisman, Ashley Bickerton, and John Armleder. Sculptor Rachel Harrison paid homage to Artschwager in her 2009 installation at the Venice Biennale by re-creating his Table with Pink Tablecloth. Louise Lawler included Artschwager in her piece Birdcalls (1972/2008), an audio artwork that transforms the names of famous male artists into a bird song, parroting names such as Beuys, Ruscha and Warhol in a mockery of conditions of privilege and recognition given to male artists at that time.

Richard Artschwager estate is represented by Xavier Hufkens, Brussels, Sprüth Magers, Berlin, and Gagosian Gallery, New York.

== Personal life ==
Artschwager lived and worked in New York City with his wife, Ann (Sebring). The couple met in 1991, while Ann was working at the Mary Boone Gallery. He was previously married to Elfriede Wejmelka (1947 to 1971; divorced; one child), Catherine Kord (1972 to 1989; divorced), and Molly O'Gorman (? to 1993; divorced; two children).

Artschwager died February 9, 2013, in Albany, New York after a stroke he had weeks earlier. He was 89. He was survived by his wife; his children Eva, Clara and Augustus Theodore, and by his sister, Margarita Kay.
