= Table with Pink Tablecloth =

Artwork by Richard Artschwager

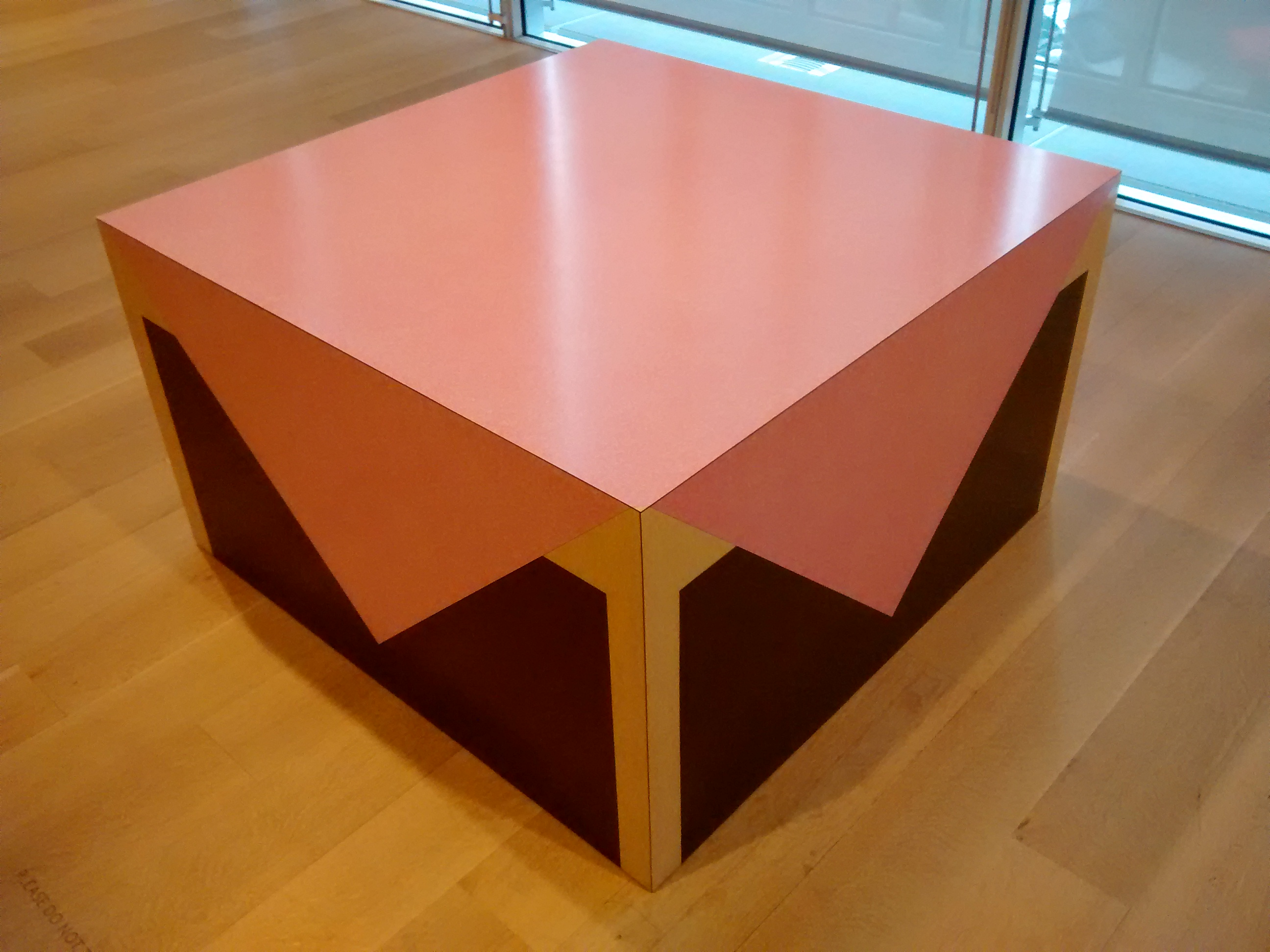
- Richard Artschwager, Table with Pink Tablecloth, 1964.
- Artist: Richard Artschwager
- Year: 1964
- Medium: Formica on Wood
- Dimensions: 64.8 cm × 111.8 cm × 111.8 cm (25.5 in × 44 in × 44 in)
- Location: Art Institute of Chicago; Chicago

Table with Pink Tablecloth is an artwork by American artist Richard Artschwager, now in the collection of the Art Institute of Chicago.

It is a work in three-dimensions constructed of Formica on wood. It was made in 1964 using skills Artschwager gained designing furniture using similar materials and similar techniques. The sculpture measures 64.8 x 111.8 x 111.8 cm (25 1/2 x 44 x 44 in).

According to art critic Ken Johnson Table With Pink Tablecloth is "something of a cross between Pop Art and a Minimalist cube by Donald Judd".

Artschwager is quoted as saying "It’s not sculptural. It’s more like a painting pushed into three dimensions. It’s a picture of wood."

At the 2009 Venice Biennale, sculptor Rachel Harrison recreated Table with Pink Tablecloth in tribute.
