= Terrain Gallery =

Art gallery in Manhattan, New York

- Location: 141 Greene Street, New York, New York 10012, United States
- Coordinates: 40.725989°N 73.99882°W
- Co-Directors: Carrie Wilson and Marcia Rackow
- Website: TerrainGallery.org

The Terrain Gallery, or the Terrain, is an art gallery and educational center at 141 Greene Street in SoHo, Manhattan, New York City. It was founded in 1955 with a philosophic basis: the ideas of Aesthetic Realism and the Siegel Theory of Opposites, developed by American poet and educator Eli Siegel. Its motto is a statement by Siegel: "In reality opposites are one; art shows this."

== History ==
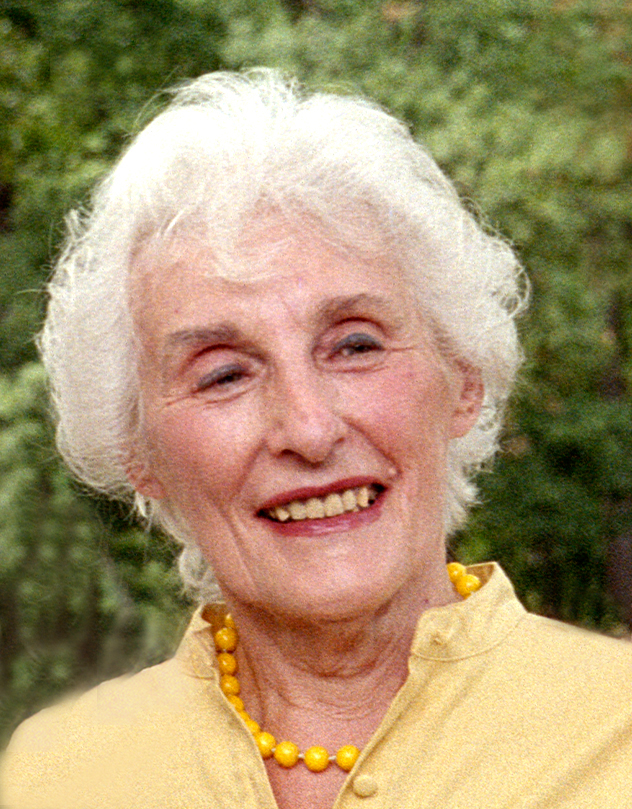
Dorothy Koppelman, 2002

Under the direction of painter Dorothy Koppelman, the Terrain Gallery opened on February 26, 1955 with the publication of Siegel’s fifteen questions, Is Beauty the Making One of Opposites? (subsequently reprinted in The Journal of Aesthetics and Art Criticism). Reviewing the opening exhibition, "Intersection '55", Parker Tyler wrote in Art News of the "explicitly inquiring and venturesome spirit" at the Terrain. Bennett Schiff in the New York Post wrote that "there probably hasn't been a gallery before this like the Terrain, which devotes itself to the integration of art with all of living according to an esthetic principle which is part of an entire, encompassing philosophic theory...Aesthetic Realism developed and taught by Eli Siegel".

From the beginning, the Terrain was simultaneously an exhibition space for contemporary art and a cultural center with "a lively and unconventional approach to aesthetic issues" where artists, scholars, and the general public could learn about and discuss principles of Aesthetic Realism, such as "The resolution of conflict in self is like the making one of opposites in art."

Although exhibiting artists were not required to endorse Aesthetic Realism, many wrote comments on the Siegel Theory of Opposites in relation to their work, which were displayed with their art. Over the years, dozens of exhibition announcements, catalogues, and broadsides were printed and circulated by the Terrain, describing how the opposites in reality are central in art.

Artists whose work has been exhibited at the Terrain Gallery include Ad Reinhardt, Larry Rivers, Chaim Koppelman, Robert Blackburn, Roy Lichtenstein, Hans Namuth, Dorothy Koppelman, André Kertész, Mark Di Suvero, Will Barnet, Richard Anuszkiewicz, Richard Artschwager, George Tooker, Lois Dodd, Jim Dine, Elaine de Kooning, and Steve Poleskie. Pop artist Richard Bernstein, optical artist Arnold Alfred Schmidt, photographers Nancy Starrels, Lou Dienes, Nat Herz, and others had their first one-person shows at the Terrain.

=== Location changes ===
First located at 20 West 16th Street, the Terrain Gallery moved in 1964 to 39 Grove Street in Greenwich Village, where it continued to hold art exhibitions and dramatic presentations of Aesthetic Realism.

In 1973 the Terrain moved to SoHo, Manhattan, becoming part of the not-for-profit Aesthetic Realism Foundation located at 141 Greene Street. There, the gallery featured a one-man show of drawings and silkscreens by Charles Magistro, and continued exhibitions such as "Big and Small" ("Art shows that nothing, however small, is without largeness and meaning"), and "The Arts, They’re Here!: Ten Arts and the Opposites", which included music and architecture.

=== "Art Answers the Questions of Your Life" ===
In 1984, the Terrain Gallery began a new series of weekly talks, free to the public, called Art Answers the Questions of Your Life. These talks discussed topics such as how precision and abandon are one in Jackson Pollock's action painting, what mothers can learn about children from the art of Mary Cassatt, "Can Exuberance Be Sensible?: Hans Hofmann’s Rhapsody" by Bennett Cooperman, and "Logic and Emotion in Love and in the Shah Nameh by Barbara Buehler. An overview of this series of more than 175 talks on art of diverse genres and periods was presented by co-directors Dorothy Koppelman and Carrie Wilson at the 31st World Congress of the International Society for Education through Art (Teachers College, Columbia University, 2003).

In 2005, the Terrain Gallery held a 50th anniversary exhibition that brought together works by 52 artists, several of whom contributed statements about how the Aesthetic Realism of Eli Siegel influenced their work. A memorial exhibition for Chaim Koppelman, in 2010, included over six decades of the artist's prints, paintings, pastels, and sculpture, with critical comment.

== Aesthetic Realism and the Siegel Theory of Opposites ==
The Terrain Gallery differed from other art galleries of the time in several ways. It held large group exhibitions that successfully combined diverse stylistic tendencies, such as realism and abstraction, when this was unusual. Painting, sculpture, watercolor, and graphics were brought together under the titles "Abstract and Concrete", "Depth and Surface", "Logic and Emotion", and "Rest and Motion". The Terrain Gallery also held "one of the first exhibitions honoring photography as a fine art".

== The Seurat Art Club and the George Saintsbury Poetry Club ==
In 1955, the year it opened, the Terrain began a series of talks by the Seurat Art Club, working artists who spoke about the relevance of the Siegel Theory of Opposites to contemporary art and life.

Discussing both classical and contemporary work, club members considered the relation of composition in art and in life. They described art as having ethical implications, being "not an escape from life but a true picture of reality".

Existing records of one of the discussions held at the Terrain in 1961 indicate that many artists felt that while opposites were undeniably present in their work, the conscious awareness of them would "lessen, or somehow destroy, the 'magic,' the 'talent,' the 'je ne sais quoi'" of art. Others believed that "study of the opposites makes for an entirely new level of perception, a surer technique, a wider field of vision." Painter Rolph Scarlett wrote: "The Siegel Theory of Opposites, which is the motivating consideration of this gallery, is inspiring." Sculptor Barbara Lekberg, in an interview that appeared in the magazine American Artist, stated that Aesthetic Realism shows "not only that conscious knowledge can cause the unconscious to give up its riches, but also that this process of giving form to feeling has in it the principles of happiness for all people, not just artists."

In addition to talks on art, the Terrain held poetry readings and discussions by the George Saintsbury Poetry Club. The Terrain Gallery published Personal & Impersonal: Six Aesthetic Realists, a book of poems by Sheldon Kranz, Louis Dienes, Nancy Starrels, Nat Hertz, Martha Baird and Rebecca Fein and held an exhibition of work by 45 artists, including Leonard Baskin, Robert Andrew Parker, and Nathan Cabot Hale, inspired by the poems.

== Response ==
Art critics generally praised exhibitions at the Terrain, but many ignored the philosophy behind these exhibitions, or wrote of it disparagingly. When Art News published an interview with Tiffany award-winner Chaim Koppelman, founder of the printmaking division of the School of Visual Arts, an artist who considered Aesthetic Realism central to his work, the magazine omitted all mention of the philosophy, and even the word "opposites" did not appear.

In response to the art critics, Mr. and Mrs. Koppelman placed an ad in The Village Voice in which they asked critics and artists to be fair to Aesthetic Realism and Eli Siegel:

We ask you, personally, to be fair to Aesthetic Realism and Eli Siegel...We find bizarre the tendency in artists and critics to call Aesthetic Realism a cult while using it—under cover of "common knowledge"—to crystallize their own thoughts and writing on art...We cannot consider any person a friend who does not want to be fair to Aesthetic Realism and Eli Siegel.

Dorothy and Chaim Koppelman both had one-person shows at the Terrain, and both were chosen for MoMA's 1962 exhibition "Recent Painting USA: The Figure".
