= Gladys Emerson Cook =

American artist (1894–1977)

- Born: November 7, 1894
- Died: February 1977 (aged 82)
- Occupation: Artist

Gladys Emerson Cook (November 7, 1894 – February 20, 1977) was an American artist. She is known for her pictures of domestic pets and wild animals. Cook also wrote and illustrated books about animals including how to draw them.

== Early life and education ==
Cook was born in Haverhill, Massachusetts. She earned a bachelor of science degree at Skidmore College in 1921, followed by a master's degree at the University of Wisconsin in 1923.

== Works ==
=== Art ===
Cook's artworks are held in the collections of the Marianna Kistler Beach Museum of Art (Queenie and Her Cubs), the Metropolitan Museum of Art (Siamese Interlude), the New York Public Library (Queenie and Her Cubs), Huntsville Museum of Art (Trellis Gateway), the Museum of Fine Arts, Boston, the Library of Congress, the Smithsonian Institution, the Cincinnati Art Museum, and the AKC Museum of the Dog (Ch. King Messenger, Pug Puppy, Pug Drawing, Tri-Int. Ch. Pugville’s Mighty Jim, and Wire Fox Terrier).

Thirty-five of Cook's watercolor drawings are included in the Index of American Design held at the National Gallery of Art.

=== Books ===
Cook wrote and illustrated:

- Drawing Wildlife (1972) OCLC 672982
- All Breeds, All Champions: A Book Of Dogs (1962) OCLC 1555976
- Drawing Cats: Breeds; Structure; Anatomy; Poses and Behavior (1958) OCLC 2643282
- Drawing Dogs (1958) OCLC 1744522
- Circus Clowns On Parade (1956) OCLC 1577223
- The Big Book Of Cats (with contributing text by Felix Sutton) (1954) OCLC 561086
- American Champions (1945) OCLC 756385855#
- Zoo Animals (1943) OCLC 7728384.

She illustrated:

- Black Douglas (written by Adelaide Bolton Louden) (1957) OCLC 1817341
- Favorite Cat Stories Of Pamela And James Mason (written by Pamela And James Mason) (1956) OCLC 2899169
- Drawing Animals (written by Victor Semon Pérard) (1951) OCLC 3270825
- Cats: Care, Training, Feeding, Breeding, Exhibiting (written by Marguerite Ann Norton) (1949) OCLC 1456747
- Drawing horses (written by Victor Semon Pérard) (1944) OCLC 3757695
- Matou, The Biography Of A Cat (written by Max Kaufman) (1942) OCLC 5185470
- Hiram And Other Cats (written by Laurence Dwight Smith) (1941) OCLC 3013005.
