= Una Johnson =

American curator and art historian

- Born: 1905; Dayton, Iowa, U.S.
- Died: April 28, 1997 (aged 91); New York City, New York, U.S.
- Education: University of Chicago; Case Western Reserve University

Una Johnson (1905 – April 28, 1997) was an American curator and art historian. She was the head curator of prints and drawings at the Brooklyn Museum for more than 25 years.

== Early life and education ==
Johnson was born in Dayton, Iowa, in 1905. She studied art history and literature at the University of Chicago and at Case Western Reserve University in Cleveland.

== Career ==
Johnson worked at the Cleveland Museum of Art before taking a job in 1936 as assistant curator of prints and drawings at the Brooklyn Museum. In 1937, she oversaw the purchase of a complete set of Francisco Goya's Caprichos print series for the museum's collection. When curator Carl O. Schniewiend retired in 1941, she was promoted to his position, which she would hold for the next 28 years.

Johnson curated many major exhibitions for the Brooklyn Museum, including the first exhibition of the work of art dealer and publisher Ambroise Vollard (1941), the first exhibition of Edvard Munch prints in the United States (1942), the internationally recognized survey American Woodcuts 1670-1950 (1950), and New Expressions in Fine Printmaking (1952). In 1947, she curated the Brooklyn Museum's first National Print Exhibition, an event she organized annually until 1968. During her tenure, the Brooklyn Museum made important acquisitions for its print collection, including works by Daumier, a collection of Japanese prints, and many contemporary European works.

She published numerous books and monographs about printmaking, focusing on artists like Georges Rouault, Isabel Bishop, and Adja Yunkers. She was a Ford Foundation grant recipient, which enabled her to write a series of monographs about American artists including John Paul Jones and Milton Avery. Johnson also wrote catalogues raissone for the artists Karl Schrag and Louise Nevelson.

Johnson retired from her post at the Brooklyn Museum in 1969 and was named a curator emeritus of the institution in 1973. She also spent three years as director of the Storm King Art Center in Mountainville, New York.

In 1997, Johnson died at the age of 91 in New York City.

== Selected publications ==
- Isabel Bishop, Prints and Drawings: 1925-1964, Brooklyn, New York: Brooklyn Museum (1964)
- American Woodcuts 1670-1950, Brooklyn, New York: Brooklyn Museum (1950)
- Adja Yunkers: Prints 1927-1967, Brooklyn, New York: Brooklyn Museum (1969)
- 20th-Century Master Drawings, Boston: Little, Brown (1976)
- Ambroise Vollard, éditeur: prints, books, bronzes, New York: Museum of Modern Art (1977)
- American Prints and Printmakers, Garden City, New York: Doubleday (1980)
