= Aesthetic Realism =

School of philosophy

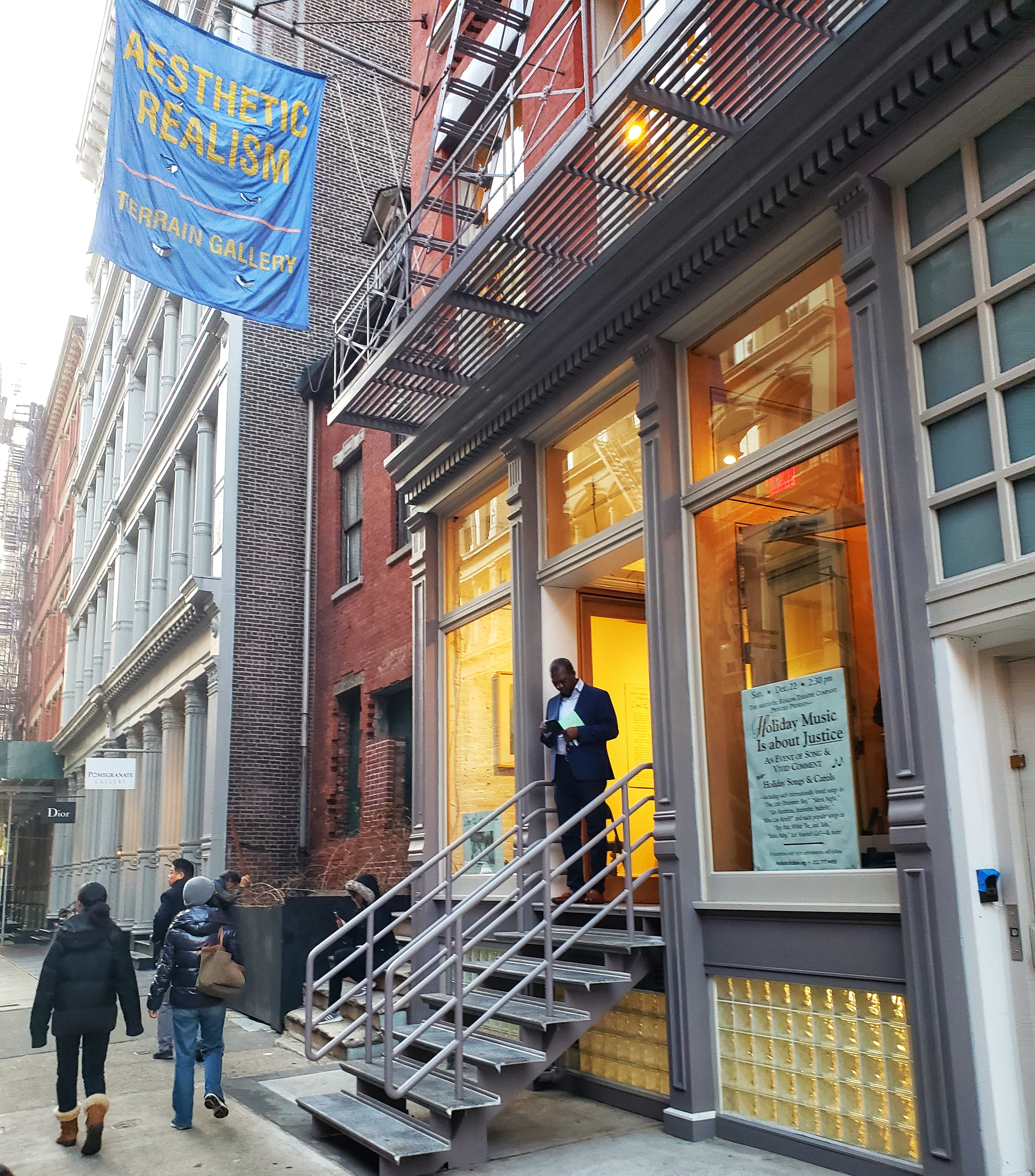
- The Aesthetic Realism Foundation is located in SoHo (NYC)
- Founder: Eli Siegel (1902–78)
- Purpose: Philosophy dedicated to the understanding of, and greater respect for, people, art, and reality.
- Coordinates: 40.725989°N 73.99882°W
- Chair: Ellen Reiss, Chair of Education
- Website: AestheticRealism.org

Aesthetic Realism is a philosophy founded in 1941 by the American poet and critic Eli Siegel (1902–1978). He defined it as a three-part study: "[T]hese three divisions can be described as: One, Liking the world; Two, The opposites; Three, The meaning of contempt."

Aesthetic Realism differs from other approaches to mind in identifying a person's attitude to the whole world as the most crucial thing in their life, affecting how one sees everything, including love, work, and other people. For example, it identifies the cause of boredom as the desire to have contempt for the world. The philosophy is principally taught at the Aesthetic Realism Foundation, an educational institution based in SoHo, New York City.

In the 1980s the Foundation faced controversy for its assertion that men changed from homosexuality to heterosexuality through study of Aesthetic Realism. In 1990, it stopped presentations and consultations on this subject.

== Philosophy ==
Eli Siegel described the philosophy of Aesthetic Realism as a study in three parts: "One, Man's greatest, deepest desire is to like the world honestly. Two, The one way to like the world honestly, not as a conquest of one's own, is to see the world as the aesthetic oneness of opposites. Three, The greatest danger or temptation of man is to get a false importance or glory from the lessening of things not himself; which lessening is Contempt. Even more briefly, these three divisions can be described as: One, Liking the world; Two, The opposites; Three, The meaning of contempt."

=== Liking the World ===
A central principle of Aesthetic Realism is that the deepest desire of every person is to like the world. It states that the purpose of art education—and all education—is to like the world.

Siegel asked, "Is this true: No matter how much of a case one has against the world—its unkindness, its disorder, its ugliness, its meaninglessness—one has to do all one can to like it, or one will weaken oneself?"

=== The Opposites ===
Aesthetic Realism is based on the idea that the way to like the world honestly is by seeing that it has an aesthetic structure of opposites. Siegel stated that all the sciences and arts provide evidence of reality's aesthetic structure and can be used to understand and like the world. For example, motion and rest, freedom and order can be seen as one in an electron, the ocean, the Solar System. These opposing forces of reality are within every person, and we are always trying to put them together. In Siegel's critical theory, "The resolution of conflict in self is like the making one of opposites in art." A good novel or musical composition, for example, composes opposites that are often in conflict in a person's mind or daily life: intensity and calm, freedom and order, unity and diversity. A successful poem or photograph or work of art in any medium, is therefore, a guide to a good life, because it shows the aesthetic structure of reality and ourselves. "All beauty," he stated, "is a making one of opposites, and the making one of opposites is what we are going after in ourselves."

=== The Meaning of Contempt ===
Siegel recognized that the desire to like the world is in a constant fight with another competing desire: the desire for contempt, or the hope to lessen what is different from oneself as a means of self-increase as one sees it. He writes in The Right of Aesthetic Realism to Be Known, number 247:

Aesthetic Realism differs from psychoanalysis and differs from other ways of seeing, when it says that contempt is the greatest danger of an individual; of society. ... Contempt is the one sure means people all over the world have of building themselves up. Contempt is in families, chancelleries, lodges, on pillows, in halls. It is that in [a person] which says: "If I can make less of this and this and this, my glory is greater." …And it should be remembered that having contempt is the same as disliking the world.

=== An Ethical Obligation and the Means of Liking Oneself ===
A key study in Aesthetic Realism is how an attitude to the world as a whole shapes every aspect of life, from relationships with friends and spouses to the enjoyment of books, food, and interactions with people both near and far. Accordingly, the philosophy argues that individuals have an ethical obligation to "see the world as well as we can" and where we don't hope to see things and people fairly "contempt ...is winning." Aesthetic Realism states that the conscious intention to be fair to the world and people is not only an ethical obligation, but the means of liking oneself.

Siegel stated that until good will rather than contempt is at the center of our thoughts about people, "civilization has yet to begin." He defined good will as "the desire to have something else stronger and more beautiful, for this desire makes oneself stronger and more beautiful."

== Major texts ==
The philosophic basis of Aesthetic Realism was set forth systematically by Siegel in two major texts. The first, Self and World: An Explanation of Aesthetic Realism, was written from 1941 to 1943. Individual chapters, including "Psychiatry, Economics, Aesthetics" and "The Aesthetic Method in Self-Conflict", were printed in 1946. The full text was published in 1981. It presents the philosophy in terms of how it applies to everyday life and understanding mind. Chapters include "The Aesthetic Meaning of Psychiatry", "Love and Reality", "The Child", and "The Organization of Self" (NY: Definition Press).

A second text, Definitions, and Comment: Being a Description of the World, completed in 1945, defines 134 terms, including Existence, Happiness, Power, Success, Reality, and Relation. Definitions of one sentence are given for every term, followed by a lengthier explanation. The work was published in 1978-9 as a series in the journal The Right of Aesthetic Realism to Be Known.

A third philosophic text, The Aesthetic Nature of the World, is largely unpublished, although selections appear in The Right of Aesthetic Realism to Be Known.

== Poetry ==
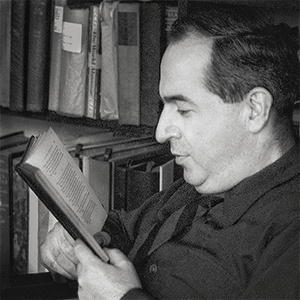
Eli Siegel in 1947 (photo by Louis Dienes)

Aesthetic Realism arose from Eli Siegel's teaching of poetry. He stated that ideas central to the philosophy were present in his poem "Hot Afternoons Have Been in Montana", which won The Nation's annual poetry prize in 1925. The philosophic principle that individuality is relation, "that the very self of a thing is its relations, its having-to-do-with other things", is in this poem. It begins with a hot, quiet afternoon in Montana, and travels through time and space, showing that the diversity of reality is surprisingly connected, and things, people and places usually regarded as separate "have a great deal to do with each other."

== Aesthetic Realism Foundation ==
The not-for-profit Aesthetic Realism Foundation was established by Siegel's students in 1973. Located at 141 Greene Street in SoHo, New York, it is the primary location where the philosophy is now taught, in public seminars, dramatic and musical presentations, semester classes, and individual consultations. There is an interactive workshop for teachers, "The Aesthetic Realism Teaching Method", and classes in poetry, anthropology, art, music, and "Understanding Marriage."

Ellen Reiss is the Aesthetic Realism Chair of Education, appointed by Eli Siegel in 1977. Since that time, she has conducted professional classes for the Foundation's faculty. Herself an Aesthetic Realism consultant since 1971, Reiss also taught in the English departments of Queens and Hunter Colleges, City University of New York. She is a poet, editor, and co-author (with Martha Baird) of The Williams-Siegel Documentary (Definition Press, 1970).

Eli Siegel died on November 8, 1978. Reiss continues his work teaching Aesthetic Realism in professional classes for the Foundation's faculty and in the course "The Aesthetic Realism Explanation of Poetry". Her commentaries on how the philosophy views life, literature, national ethics, economics, and the human self appear regularly in The Right of Aesthetic Realism to Be Known.

=== Aesthetic Realism Theatre Company ===
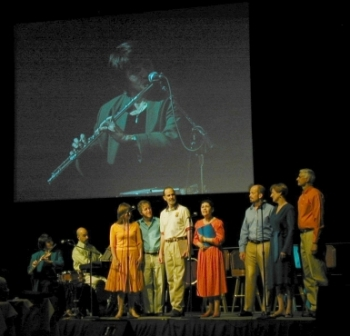
Performance by The Aesthetic Realism Theatre Company

The Aesthetic Realism Theatre Company, composed of actors, singers and musicians, has appeared throughout the country in both musical performances and dramatic productions. Presentations showing the significance of art and ethics throughout history and in our daily lives, include "Ethics Is a Force!"; "The Great Fight of Ego vs. Truth—Songs about Love, Justice & Everybody's Feelings"; "Humanity's Opposites—Beginning with Ireland" (Sean O'Casey's Juno and the Paycock and Irish Songs); and "Sheridan's The School for Scandal; or, A Sneer Brightens Everything". They have also presented dramatic readings of Siegel's lectures on works by Shakespeare, Molière, Ibsen, Strindberg, Eugene O'Neill, George Kelly, Susan Glaspell, and others.

=== Other Presentations ===
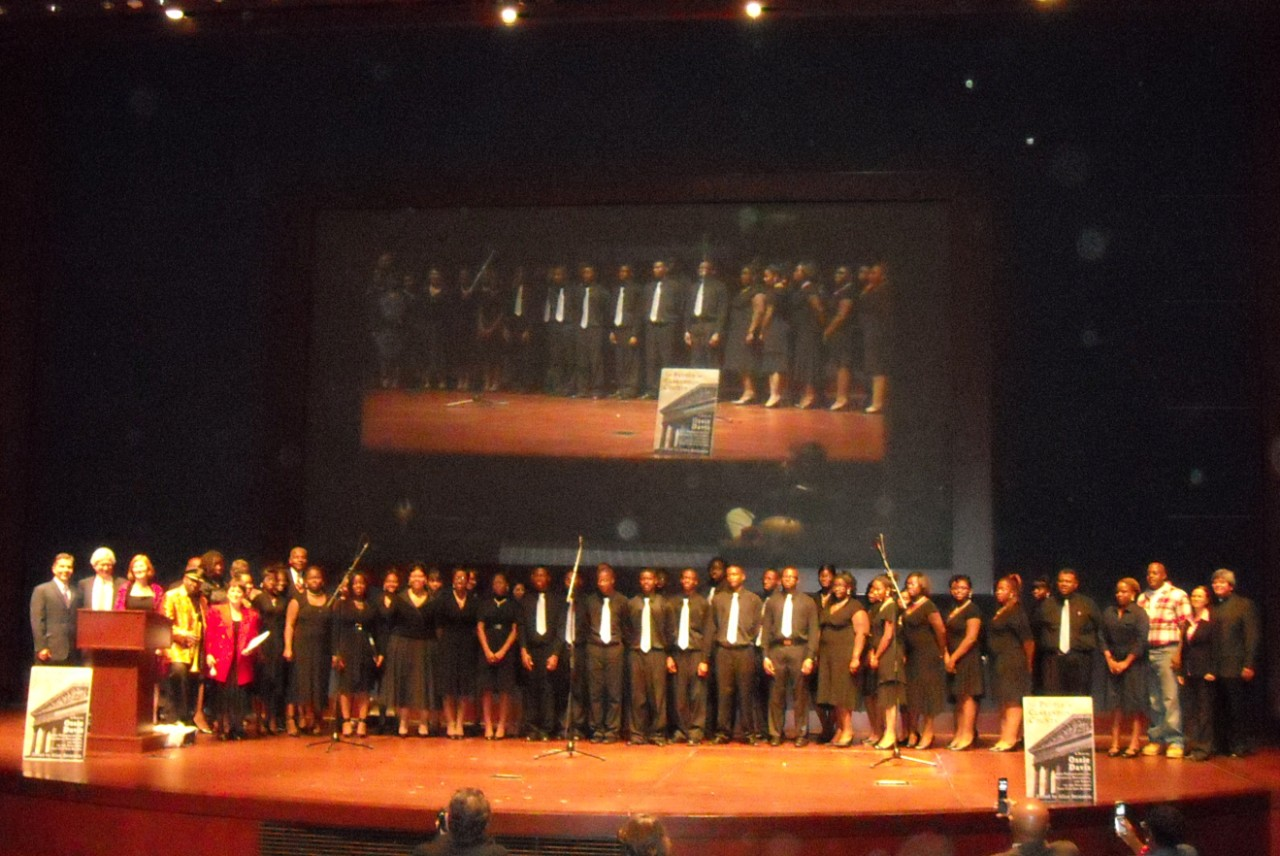
"The People of Clarendon County" presented at the Congressional Auditorium, US Capitol Visitor Center on October 21, 2009 with Aesthetic Realism faculty, the Lee Central HS Chorus, and the Thelma Slater Singers of Bishopville, South Carolina.

The People of Clarendon County (Chicago: Third World Press, 2007), includes a play by Ossie Davis, rediscovered by Alice Bernstein, together with photographs and historical documents concerning the Rev. Joseph DeLaine and others who took part in Briggs v. Elliott. This was the first of five lawsuits that eventually led to the breakthrough 1954 Supreme Court decision in Brown v. Board of Education, which made segregation in public schools illegal and struck down the "separate but equal" doctrine established in 1896 by Plessy v. Ferguson. The book includes essays on the Aesthetic Realism approach to education.

A production of The People of Clarendon County presenting the Aesthetic Realism educational method, was staged in the Congressional Auditorium of the US Capitol Visitor Center in Washington, DC on October 21, 2009, with introductory remarks given by Rep. James E. Clyburn.

The United Nations commissioned filmmaker Ken Kimmelman to make two films: Asimbonanga (1989), and Brushstrokes (1990). Kimmelman credits Aesthetic Realism as his inspiration for these films, as well as his 1995 Emmy Award-winning anti-prejudice public service film, The Heart Knows Better, based on, and including, a statement by Eli Siegel.

== History ==
=== Lectures and classes by Eli Siegel ===
In 1946, Siegel began giving weekly lectures at Steinway Hall in New York City, in which he presented what he first called Aesthetic Analysis (later, Aesthetic Realism), "a philosophic way of seeing conflict in self and making this conflict clear to a person so that a person becomes more integrated and happier." From 1948 through 1977, Siegel continued teaching in his library at 67 Jane Street in Greenwich Village, where he also resided. Individuals studied Aesthetic Realism in classes such as the Ethical Study Conference, the Nevertheless, Poetry Class, and classes in which Aesthetic Realism was discussed in relation to the arts and sciences, history, philosophy, national ethics, and world literature.

Eli Siegel gave over 30,000 such lectures and lessons over the four decades he taught Aesthetic Realism. One series, "Aesthetic Realism As Beauty", considered how particular opposites are brought together in the drama, music, sculpture, dance, and painting, and demonstrated how each of these arts unites opposites that are often in conflict in life situations. He lectured on "Aesthetic Realism and Love", "Aesthetic Realism and Scientific Method", "Aesthetic Realism and H.G. Wells' The Outline of History" and "Aesthetic Realism Looks at Things: Understanding Children". He gave a series of lectures on Henry James that was later published as the book James and the Children: A Consideration of Henry James's "The Turn of the Screw". He gave a series of lectures on Imagination, Religion, and the Arts and Sciences. Aesthetic Realism classes were scholarly and sought to demonstrate that art is related to the problems of everyday life. This contradicts the Freudian view of art as sublimation.

=== The Terrain Gallery and the arts ===
Among the earliest students of Aesthetic Realism were Chaim Koppelman (1920–2009), a painter, sculptor, printmaker, and founder of the printmaking department of the School of Visual Arts, and his wife, painter Dorothy Koppelman (1920-2017), who opened the Terrain Gallery in 1955, introducing Aesthetic Realism to the cultural scene of New York City with art exhibitions and public discussions of the Siegel Theory of Opposites in relation to painting, sculpture, photography, poetry, and later, music, theatre, and architecture.

Chaim Koppelman's interviews of Roy Lichtenstein, Richard Anuszkiewicz, and Clayton Pond, in which these artists discussed the relevance of Aesthetic Realism and Eli Siegel's Theory of Opposites to their work, are now part of the Smithsonian Archives of American Art. Artists began using Aesthetic Realism in writings about their fields, including Ralph Hattersley, editor of the photography journal Infinity, and Nat Herz, author of articles in Modern Photography and of the Konica Pocket Handbook: An Introduction to Better Photography. Aesthetic Realism: We Have Been There (NY: Definition Press, 1969), a book of essays by working artists in the fields of painting, printmaking, photography, acting, and poetry, documents how the Siegel Theory of Opposites "relates life to art and is basically a criterion for all branches of aesthetics".

Some artistic productions inspired by the philosophy were surrounded by controversy. A theatrical production of Ibsen's Hedda Gabler by The Opposites Company of the Theatre, in which the title character was presented as "essentially good", in keeping with Siegel's interpretation of the play, was highly praised in Time magazine, but severely criticized in The New York Times, which also published Siegel's response to the critics.

=== Aesthetic Realism and homosexuality ===
A controversial aspect of the philosophy concerns the assertion that men and women could change from homosexuality through studying its principles. In 1946 writer and WWII veteran Sheldon Kranz (1919–1980) was the first man to report that he changed from homosexuality through Aesthetic Realism. Kranz said that as his way of seeing the world changed, his sexual preference also changed: from a homosexual orientation (he was no longer impelled toward men) to a heterosexual one that included love for a woman for the first time in his life. Kranz was married for 25 years (until his death) to Obie award-winning actress Anne Fielding.

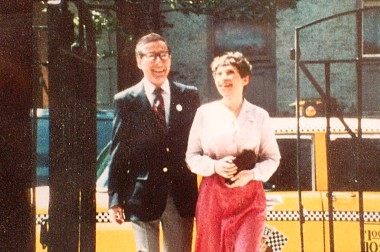
Sheldon Kranz and Anne Fielding (1980)

In keeping with its general approach, Aesthetic Realism views homosexuality as a philosophic matter. A fundamental principle of the philosophy is that every person is in a fight between contempt for the world and respect for it. Siegel stated that this fight is present as well in homosexuality. In the field of love and sex, a homosexual man prefers the sameness of another man while undervaluing the difference of the world that a woman represents. This undervaluing of difference is a form of contempt for the world; therefore, as a man learns how to like the world honestly, his attitude towards difference changes and this affects every area of his life, including sexual preference.

Beginning in 1965 supporters of the philosophy began an effort to have press and media report on the change from homosexuality through Aesthetic Realism. In 1971 men (including Kranz) who said they changed through Aesthetic Realism were interviewed on New York City's WNET Channel 13 Free Time show and the David Susskind Show, which had a national syndication. The book The H Persuasion, published that year, contained writing by Siegel detailing his premise about the cause of homosexuality, transcripts of Aesthetic Realism lessons, and narratives by men who said they changed, describing both why they changed and how. In response to requests from men and women wanting to study Aesthetic Realism, Siegel designated four consultation trios, one of which, Consultation With Three, was for the purpose of teaching men who wanted to change from homosexuality. In 1983, five other men who said they had changed from homosexuality were interviewed on the David Susskind Show. The transcript of this interview was published in the 1986 book The Aesthetic Realism of Eli Siegel and the Change from Homosexuality.

With the exception of a brief 1971 review calling The H Persuasion "less a book than a collection of pietistic snippets by Believers," The New York Times never reported that men said they changed from homosexuality through Aesthetic Realism. Students of the philosophy who said they changed from homosexuality or in other large ways accused the press of unfairly withholding information valuable to the lives of people. In the 1970s they mounted an aggressive campaign of telephone calls, letters, ads, and vigils in front of various media offices and at the homes of editors. Many wore lapel buttons that read "Victim of the Press".

In 1973 the American Psychiatric Association declassified homosexuality as a mental disorder. In 1978, ads were placed in three major newspapers stating "we have changed from homosexuality through our study of the Aesthetic Realism of Eli Siegel." They were signed by 50 men and women.

The gay press and gay reporters were generally hostile to Aesthetic Realism. A 1982 Boston Globe article written by "the first openly gay reporter" on its staff, interviewed primarily gay therapists and then reported that the "assertion" of change through Aesthetic Realism was "a claim staggering to psychiatrists and psychologists." About 250 people protested the article on the Boston Common. The Globe's ombudsman later wrote in his column that the article was biased against Aesthetic Realism and that it contained "strong, negative words without attribution" and "inaccuracies".

Some gay advocacy groups and gay activists presented Aesthetic Realism as "anti-gay", accusing the philosophy of offering a "gay cure" and expressing skepticism that homosexuality could or should change. Persons within the gay pride movement associated the desire of a man to change from homosexuality with a lack of pride in a gay identity, and saw Aesthetic Realism as biased against a gay lifestyle. The Aesthetic Realism Foundation stated unequivocally that it supported full, completely equal civil rights for homosexuals, including the right of a man or woman to live their life in the way they chose.

== Criticism ==
The organization has been described by Steven Hassan as a psychotherapy cult.

== Bibliography ==
- Baird, Martha and Reiss, Ellen, eds. The Williams-Siegel Documentary. Including Williams' Poetry Talked about by Eli Siegel, and William Carlos Williams Present and Talking: 1952. New York: Definition Press, 1970. ISBN 0-910492-12-3.
- Corsini, Raymond J. "Aesthetic Realism" in Handbook of Innovative Psychotherapies. New York: John Wiley & Sons, 1981. ISBN 0-471-06229-4.
- Hartzok, Alanna. "Earth Rights Democracy: Land, Ethics, and Public Finance Policy," paper presented at the Richard Alsina Fulton Conference on Sustainability and the Environment, 26–7 March 2004, Wilson College, Chambersburg, Pennsylvania.
- Herz, Nat. Konica Pocket Handbook: An Introduction to Better Photography (New York: Verlan Books, 1960).
- Kranz, Sheldon, ed. The H Persuasion; How Persons Have Permanently Changed from Homosexuality through the Study of Aesthetic Realism With Eli Siegel (New York: Definition Press, 1971). ISBN 0-910492-14-X
- Matson, Katinka. "Aesthetic Realism" in The Psychology Today Omnibook of Personal Development. New York: William Morrow & Co., 1977. ISBN 0-688-03225-7.
- "Foes Accuse Teachers of Cult," "'I threw out 15 years of my life,' says ex-follower," "Foundation Refutes 'Smear' Tactics", The New York Post, 8 February 1998.
- Parker, Carol. "Filmmaker Tackles Homelessness Issues," Northport Journal, Huntington, New York, 16 December 1999.
- Siegel, Eli. Self and World: An Explanation of Aesthetic Realism. New York: Definition Press, 1981. ISBN 0-910492-28-X.
- Siegel, Eli. "Civilization Begins," in The Right of Aesthetic Realism to Be Known, #228, 10 August 1977.
- Siegel, Eli. "Is Beauty the Making One of Opposites?" New York: Terrain Gallery, 1955; reprinted in the following periodicals: Journal of Aesthetics & Art Criticism, December 1955; Ante, 1964; Hibbert Journal (London), 1964.
