= Eli Siegel =

Latvian-American poet, (1902–1978)

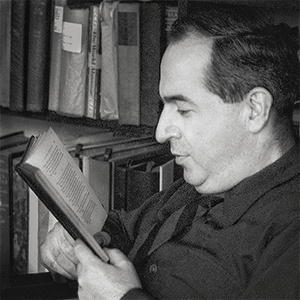
- Eli Siegel in 1947 (photo by Louis Dienes)
- Born: August 16, 1902; Dvinsk, Russian Empire
- Died: November 8, 1978 (aged 76); Greenwich Village, New York City, U.S.
- Occupations: Poet; writer; critic; educator; philosopher
- Known for: Aesthetic Realism
- Notable work: Self and World: An Explanation of Aesthetic Realism * Hot Afternoons Have Been in Montana: Poems *Hail, American Development

Eli Siegel (August 16, 1902 – November 8, 1978) was the poet, writer, critic, and philosopher who founded Aesthetic Realism, a philosophical movement based in New York City. An idea central to Aesthetic Realism—that every person, place or thing in reality has something in common with all other things—was expressed in the title poem of his first volume, Hot Afternoons Have Been in Montana: Poems. His second volume was Hail, American Development.

Siegel's works include Self and World: An Explanation of Aesthetic Realism, Definitions, and Comment: Being a Description of the World, and The Aesthetic Nature of the World. His teaching of Aesthetic Realism spanned almost four decades and included thousands of extemporaneous lectures on poetry, the arts and sciences, religion, economics, and national ethics, as well as lessons to individuals and general classes which showed that questions of everyday life are aesthetic and ethical.

His lecture on the poetry of William Carlos Williams, which Williams attended, is published in The Williams-Siegel Documentary and his lectures on Henry James's The Turn of the Screw were edited into a critical consideration titled James and the Children. Siegel's philosophy, and his statement, "The world, art, and self explain each other: each is the aesthetic oneness of opposites", has influenced artists, scientists, and educators.

== Life ==
Born in Dvinsk, Russian Empire, Siegel emigrated to the United States in 1905 with his parents, Mendel and Sarah (Einhorn) Siegel. The family settled in Baltimore, Maryland, where Siegel attended Baltimore City College and joined the speech and debate team now referred to as the Bancroft/Carrollton-Wight Literary Societies. He contributed to the senior publication The Green Bag and graduated in 1919. In 1922, together with V.F. Calverton [George Goetz], he co-founded The Modern Quarterly, a magazine in which his earliest essays appeared, including "The Scientific Criticism" (Vol. I, No. 1, March 1923) and "The Equality of Man" (Vol. I, No. 3, December 1923).

In 1925, his "Hot Afternoons Have Been in Montana" was selected from four thousand anonymously submitted poems as the winner of The Nation's esteemed poetry prize. The magazine's editors described it as "the most passionate and interesting poem which came in—a poem recording through magnificent rhythms a profound and important and beautiful vision of the earth on which afternoons and men have always existed." The poem begins:

Quiet and green was the grass of the field,
The sky was whole in brightness,
And O, a bird was flying, high, there in the sky,
So gently, so carelessly and fairly.

"Hot Afternoons" met violent opposition, according to William Carlos Williams, who wrote, years later: "Only today do I realize how important that poem is in the history of our development as a cultural entity." "In Hot Afternoons", Siegel later explained, "I tried to take many things that are thought of usually as being far apart and foreign and to show, in a beautiful way, that they aren't so separate and that they do have a great deal to do with one another."

Siegel continued writing poetry throughout his life but devoted the majority of his time over the next decades to developing Aesthetic Realism. After moving to New York City, he became a member of the Greenwich Village poets, famous for his dramatic readings of "Hot Afternoons" and other poems. His two-word poem, One Question, won recognition in 1925 as the shortest poem in the English language. It appeared in the Literary Review of the New York Evening Post:

One Question
I —
Why?

This poem was later reprinted without the author's name in an anthology edited by Louis Untermeyer and an anthology edited by Max J. Herzberg.

For several years in the 1930s Siegel served as master of ceremonies for regular poetry readings that were well known for combining poetry and jazz. He was also a regular reviewer for Scribner's magazine and the New York Evening Post Literary Review. In 1938, Siegel began teaching poetry classes with the view that "what makes a good poem is like what can make a good life". In 1941, students in these classes asked him to give individual lessons in which they might learn about their own lives. These were the first Aesthetic Realism lessons.

In 1944, Siegel married Martha Baird (University of Iowa), who had begun studying in his classes the year before. Baird would later become Secretary of the Society for Aesthetic Realism, and also a musicologist and poet in her own right.

In 1946, at Steinway Hall, Siegel began giving weekly lectures in which he presented the philosophy he first called Aesthetic Analysis (later, Aesthetic Realism) "a philosophic way of seeing conflict in self and making this conflict clear to a person so that a person becomes more integrated and happier". From 1941 to 1978, he gave many thousand lectures on poetry, history, economics—a wide variety of the arts and sciences. And he gave thousands of individual Aesthetic Realism lessons to men, women, and children. In these lessons the way of seeing the world based on aesthetics—which is Aesthetic Realism—was taught.

In 1951, William Carlos Williams read Siegel's "Hot Afternoons Have Been in Montana" again, and wrote to Martha Baird: "Everything we most are compelled to do is in that one poem." Siegel, he wrote, "belongs in the very first rank of our living artists". The prize poem became the title poem of Siegel's first volume, Hot Afternoons Have Been in Montana: Poems, nominated for a National Book Award in 1958. A decade later, his second volume, Hail, American Development, also met with critical acclaim. "I think it's about time Eli Siegel was moved up into the ranks of our acknowledged Leading Poets", wrote Kenneth Rexroth in the New York Times. Walter Leuba described Siegel's poems as "alive in a burning honesty and directness" and yet, having "exquisite emotional tact". He pointed to these lines from "Dear Birds, Tell This to Mothers":

Find the lost lines in
The writing that is your child, mothers ...

At the age of 76 Siegel had an operation for a benign prostatic condition. He called it "the operation so disastrous to me". As a result, he lost the use of his feet and was unable to sleep. According to Ellen Reiss, Aesthetic Realism Chair of Education, the operation was "the cause of his dying 5-1/2 months later".

== Works ==
=== Books ===
Among Siegel's many published works are:

- Siegel, Eli (1984). Self and World: An Explanation of Aesthetic Realism. New York: Definition Press. ISBN 9780910492287.
  "Whether child or adult is spoken of, this book sees a person's concerns with dignity and compassion." (February 1982)
- Siegel, Eli (1968). James and the Children: A Consideration of Henry James's Turn of the Screw. New York: Definition Press. OCLC 499982351.
- Siegel, Eli (1982). Goodbye Profit System: Update. New York: Definition Press. ISBN 0910492336. OCLC 64124306.

=== Books of Poetry ===
- Siegel, Eli (1958). Hot Afternoons Have Been in Montana: Poems. New York: Definition Press. OCLC 504237810.
- Siegel, Eli (1968). Hail, American Development. New York: Definition Press. ISBN 9780910492102.

==== From Hot Afternoons Have Been in Montana: Poems and Hail, American Development ====
- "Shakespeare, Compactly".
- "Quiet, Tears, Babies".
- "Dear Birds, Tell This to Mothers".
- "Hot Afternoons Have Been in Montana".
- "Twenty-One Distichs about Children".
- "Hymn to Jazz and the Like".
- "Eagles Go with the Fine News to Many Places".
- "The Dark That Was Is Here".
- "Milwaukee Eagle".
- "Ralph Isham, 1753 and Later".
- "Love Lurches Along".
- "And There Prevail".
- "Local Stop, Sheridan Square".

=== Essays ===
Some of his many essays and broadsides include:

- "Is Beauty the Making One of Opposites?"', The Journal of Aesthetics and Art Criticism, Vol. XIV, No. 2, December 1955 (see Terrain Gallery).
- "Husbands and Poems", Today's Japan, 1960.
- "Alcoholism; or, You Got to Find the World Interesting", Definition, 1962.
- "The Ordinary Doom", A Book of Nonfiction, (New York: The Macmillan Company, 1965), pp. 250–255.
- "Assonance Is Like This", New York Quarterly, no. 2 (1970), pp. 82–90.

=== Comments on Siegel's work ===
William Carlos Williams wrote of the poem Hot Afternoons Have Been in Montana, "I say definitely that that single poem, out of a thousand others written in the past quarter century, secures our place in the cultural world." Williams was an early supporter of Siegel's poetry and defender of his views. He wrote:

I can't tell you how important Siegel's work is in the light of my present understanding of the modern poem. He belongs in the very first rank of our living artists.

And Williams added:

The other side of the picture is the extreme resentment that a fixed, sclerotic mind feels confronting this new. It shows itself by the violent opposition Siegel received from the "authorities" whom I shall not dignify by naming and after that by neglect. ...

John Henry Faulk, speaking of the poems in Hot Afternoons Have Been in Montana, said on CBS radio, "Eli Siegel makes a man glad he's alive."

Kenneth Rexroth wrote in the New York Times Book Review of Hail, American Development that Siegel's poems contained "...incomparable sensibility at work saying things nobody else could say and in the long ones the rhythms are as new inventions as once were Blake's or Whitman's or Apollinaire's", adding, "...all through Hail, American Development are Translations, mostly from the French, that show a penetration both original and extraordinary. His Translations of Baudelaire and his commentaries on them rank him with the most understanding of the Baudelaire critics in any language." (March 23, 1969)

In Contemporary Authors Ellen Reiss, Aesthetic Realism Chairman of Education, stated:

Eli Siegel's work, which in time became Aesthetic Realism, was the cause of some of the largest praise, the largest love in persons, and also the largest resentment …

In writing an entry about [him] for Contemporary Authors, you are somewhat in the position you would be writing an entry on the poet John Keats in 1821. That is, if you were to rely on what was said of Keats by most established critics (critics now remembered principally for their injustice to one of the greatest English writers), you would present the author of `Ode to a Nightingale' as a presumptuous `Cockney poet' whose works were `driveling idiocy.' In writing about Eli Siegel [now], you are writing about a contemporary who is great; who all his life met what William Carlos Williams described him as meeting, `the extreme resentment that a fixed, sclerotic mind feels confronting this new'; who now, after his death, is beginning, just barely beginning, to be seen with something like fairness.

Huntington Cairns, Secretary of the National Gallery of Art in Washington, D.C., described Siegel's place in the understanding of aesthetics—the branch of philosophy which studies beauty—as follows:

I believe that Eli Siegel was a genius. He did for aesthetics what Spinoza did for ethics.

Donald Kirkley wrote in The Baltimore Sun (1944) reporting on Siegel's reaction to his 1925 national fame,

Baltimore friends close to him at the time will testify to a certain integrity and steadfastness of purpose which distinguished Mr. Siegel ... He refused to exploit a flood of publicity which was enough to float any man to financial comfort ...

And William Carlos Williams also wrote,

Only today do I realize how important that poem [Hot Afternoons Have Been in Montana] is in the history of our development as a cultural entity.

In 2002 the city of Baltimore placed a plaque in Druid Hill Park to commemorate the centennial of Eli Siegel's birth. That same year, on July 26, 2002, Representative Elijah E. Cummings read a tribute to Siegel in the United States House of Representatives.

== Epitaph ==
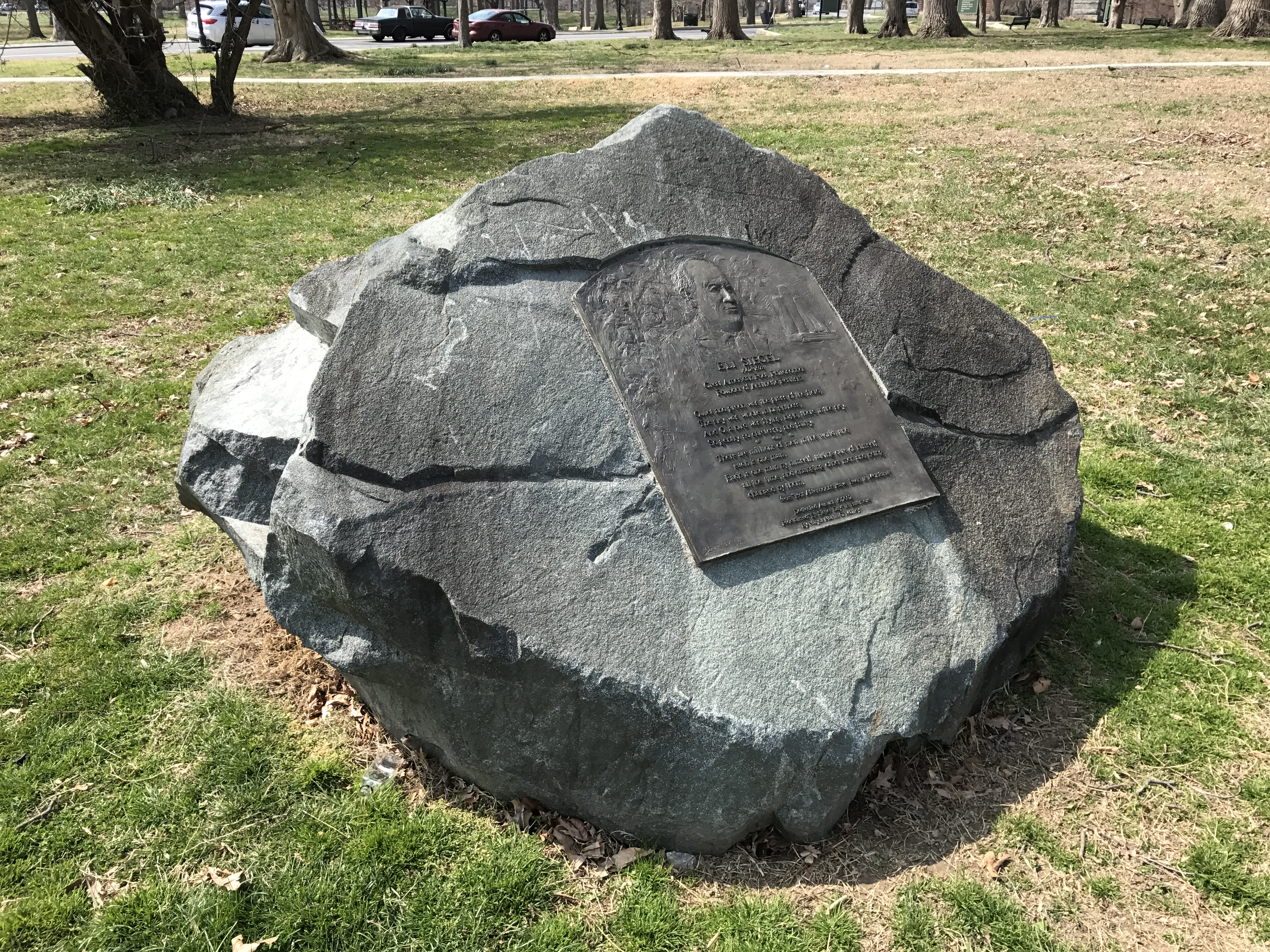
Eli Siegel Historical Marker, Druid Hill Park, Baltimore, MD

The following are lines from Hot Afternoons Have Been in Montana, one of the poems which Selden Rodman commented "say more (and more movingly) about here and now than any contemporary poems I have read". (August 17, 1957 Saturday Review) These lines stand for what Ellen Reiss has described as Siegel's "beautiful, faithful, passionate, critical, loving attention to the world and humanity."

The world is waiting to be known; Earth, what it has in it!
The past is in it;
All words, feelings, movements, words, bodies, clothes, girls,
trees, stones, things of beauty, books, desires are in it;
and all are to be known;
Afternoons have to do with the whole world;
And the beauty of mind, feeling knowingly the world!
