= Printmaking =

Process of creating artworks by printing

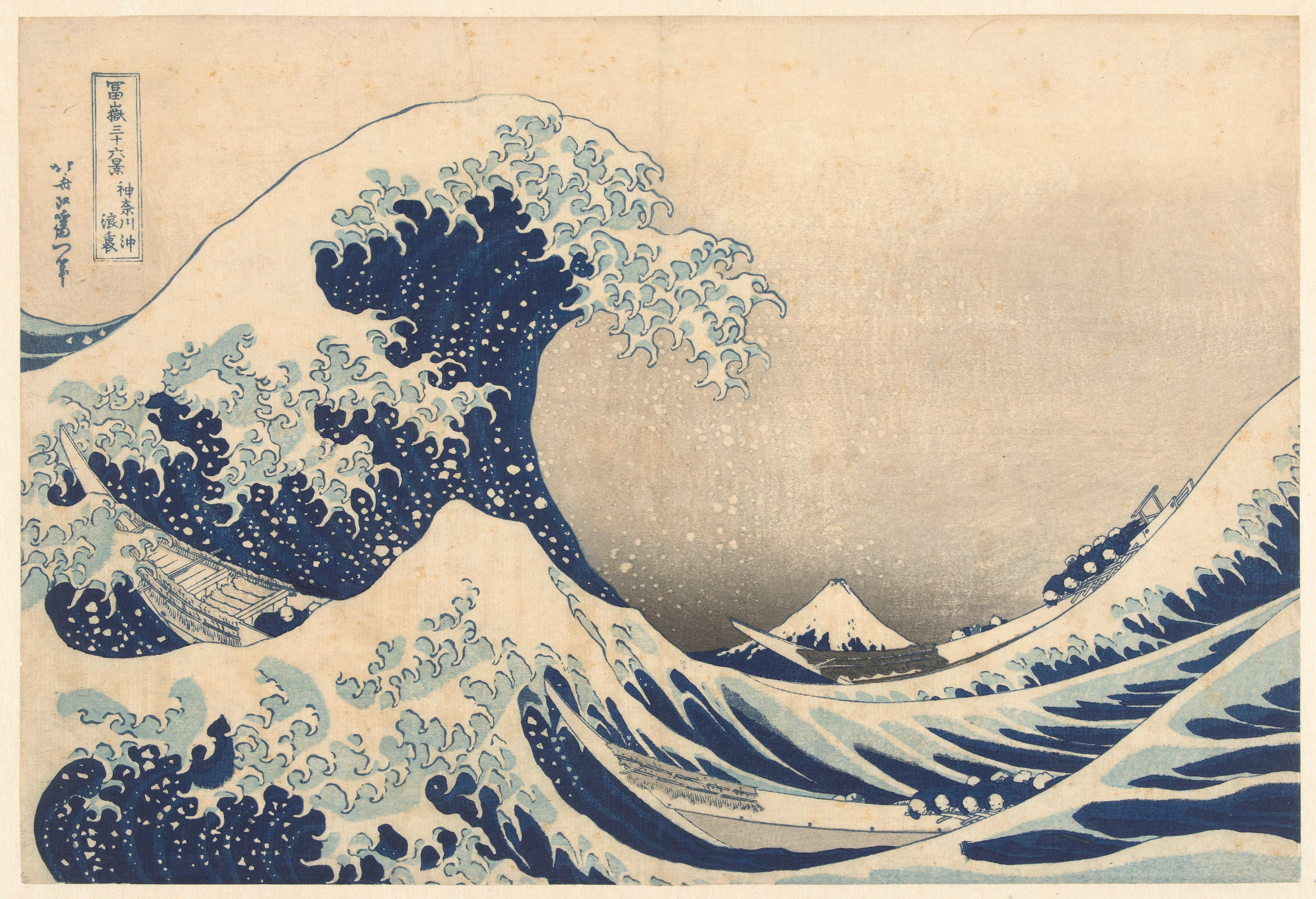
Katsushika Hokusai, The Underwave off Kanagawa, 1829/1833, color woodcut, Rijksmuseum Collection

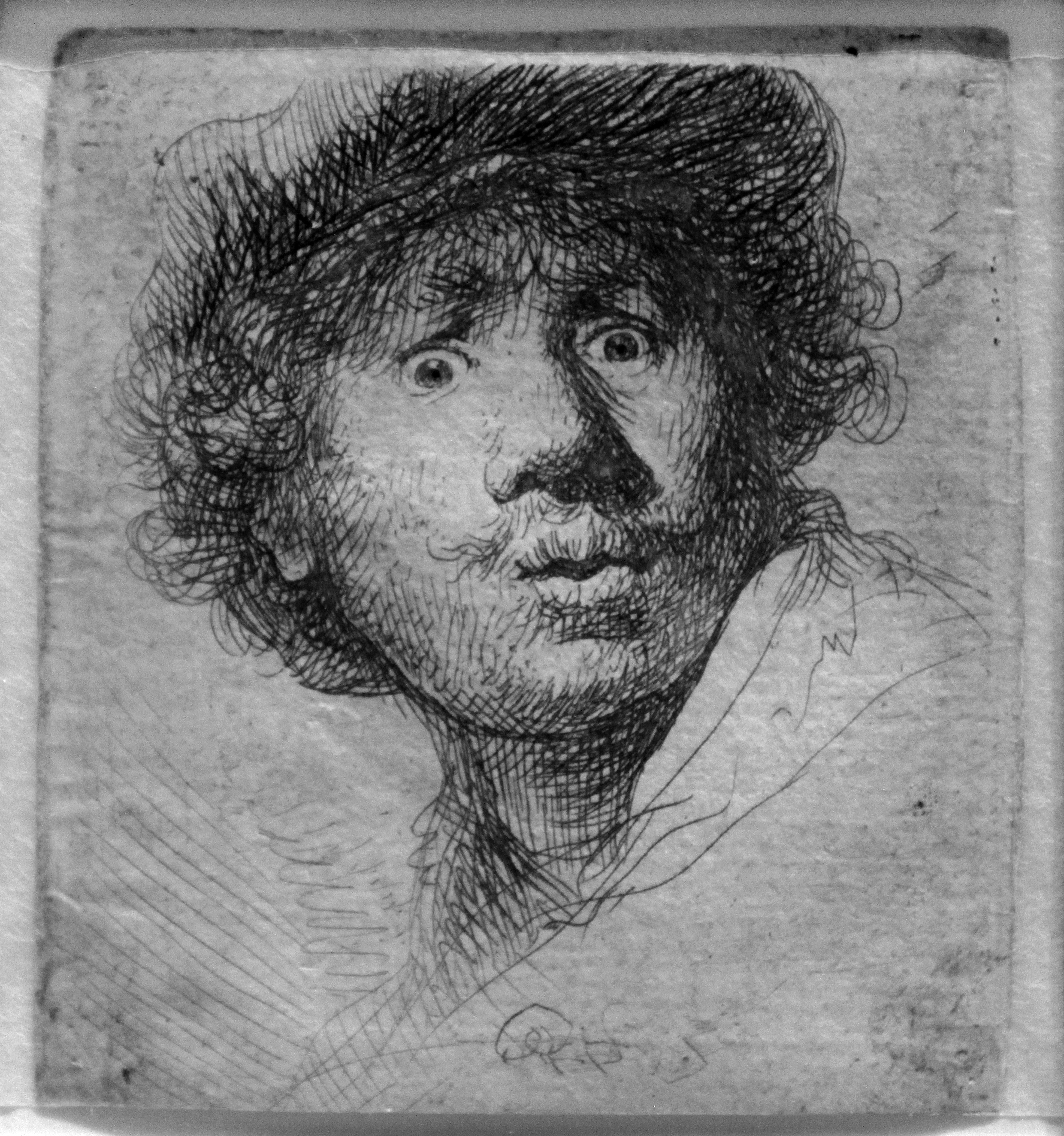
Rembrandt, Self-portrait, etching, c. 1630

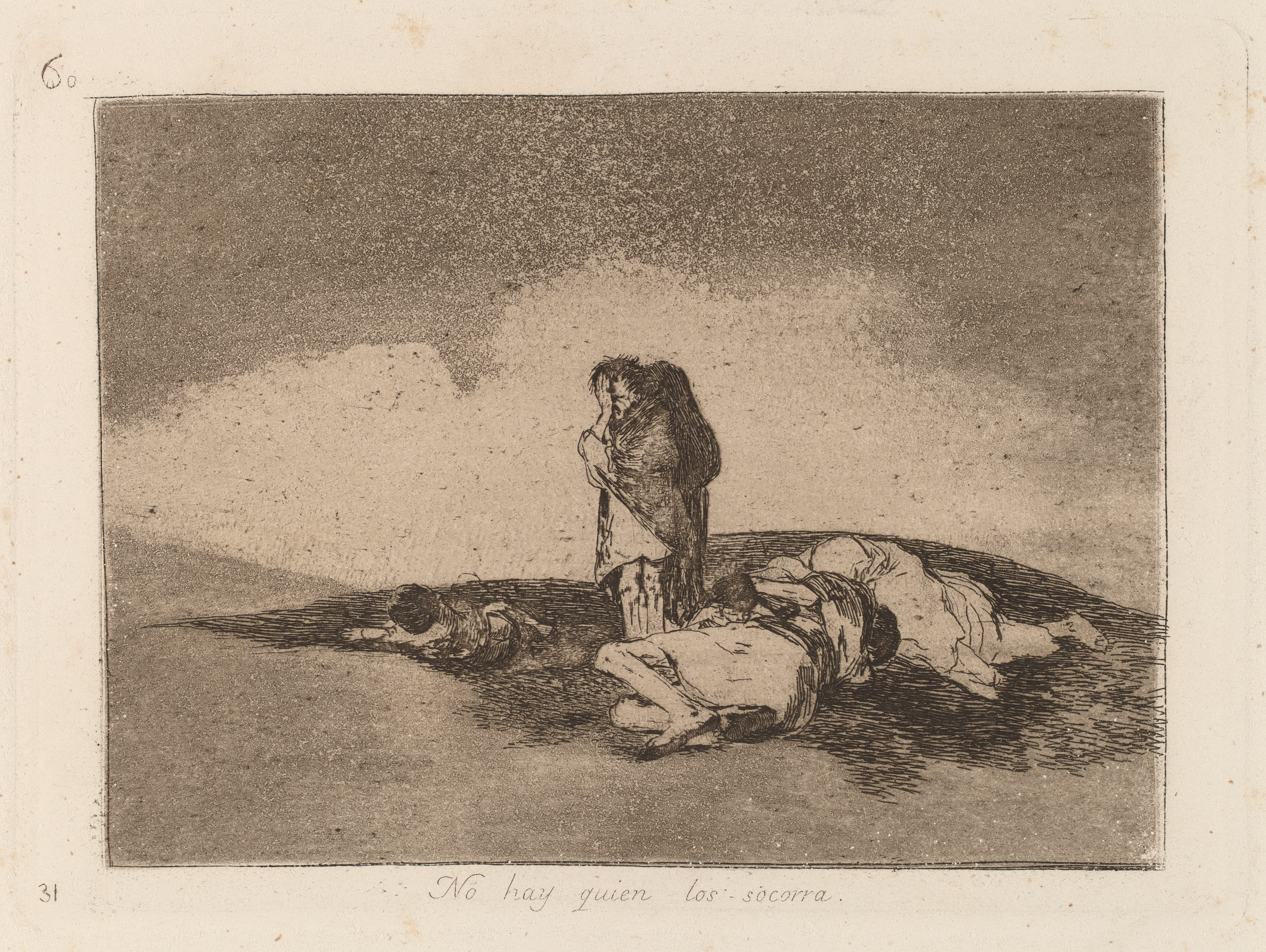
Francisco Goya, There is No One To Help Them, Disasters of War series, aquatint c. 1810

Printmaking is the process of creating artworks by printing, normally on paper, but also on fabric, wood, metal, and other surfaces. "Traditional printmaking" normally covers only the process of creating prints using a hand-processed technique, rather than a photographic reproduction of a visual artwork which would be printed using an electronic machine (a printer); however, there is some cross-over between traditional and digital printmaking, including Risograph.

Prints are created by transferring ink from a matrix to a sheet of paper or other material, by a variety of techniques. Common types of matrices include: metal plates for engraving, etching and related intaglio printing techniques; stone, aluminum, or polymer for lithography; blocks of wood for woodcuts and wood engravings; and linoleum for linocuts. Screens made of silk or synthetic fabrics are used for the screen printing process. Other types of matrix substrates and related processes are discussed below.

Except in the case of monotyping, all printmaking processes have the capacity to produce identical multiples of the same artwork, which is called a print. Each print produced is considered an "original" work of art, and is correctly referred to as an "impression", not a "copy" (that means a different print copying the first, common in early printmaking). However, impressions can vary considerably, whether intentionally or not. Master printmakers are technicians who are capable of printing identical "impressions" by hand. A print that copies another work of art, especially a painting, is known as a "reproductive print".

Multiple impressions printed from the same matrix form an edition. Since the late 19th century, artists have generally signed individual impressions from an edition and often number the impressions to form a limited edition; the matrix is then destroyed so that no more prints can be produced. Prints may also be printed in book form, such as illustrated books or artist's books.

== Techniques ==
External videos
- Printmaking: Woodcuts and Engravings, Smarthistory

=== Overview ===
Printmaking techniques are generally divided into the following basic categories:

- Relief, where ink is applied to the original surface of the matrix, while carved or displaced grooves are absent of ink. Relief techniques include woodcut or woodblock, wood engraving, linocut and metalcut.
- Intaglio, where ink is forced into grooves or cavities in the surface of the matrix. Intaglio techniques include collagraphy, engraving, etching, mezzotint, aquatint.
- Planographic, where the matrix retains its original surface, but is specially prepared and/or inked to allow for the transfer of the image. Planographic techniques include lithography, monotyping, and digital techniques.
- Stencil, where ink or paint is pressed through a prepared screen or material with cutout elements, including screen printing, Risograph, and pochoir.

Types of printmaking outside of this group are viscosity printing, water surface printing such as paper marbling. Contemporary printmaking may include digital printing, photographic mediums, or a combination of digital, photographic, and traditional processes.

Many of these techniques can also be combined, especially within the same family. For example, Rembrandt's prints are usually referred to as "etchings" for convenience, but very often include work in engraving and drypoint as well, and sometimes have no etching at all.

=== Woodcut ===
Artists using this technique include
- Albrecht Dürer
- Hans Burgkmair
- Ugo da Carpi
- Hiroshige
- Hokusai
- Frans Masereel
- Gustave Baumann
- Ernst Ludwig Kirchner
- Eric Slater
- Antonio Frasconi

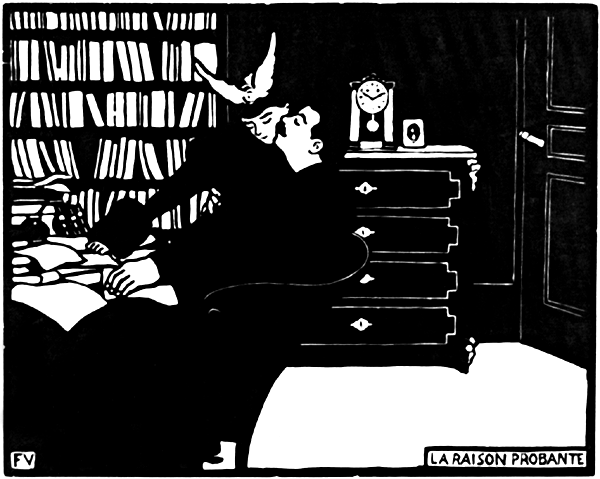
Félix Vallotton, La raison probante (The Cogent Reason), woodcut from the series Intimités, (1898)

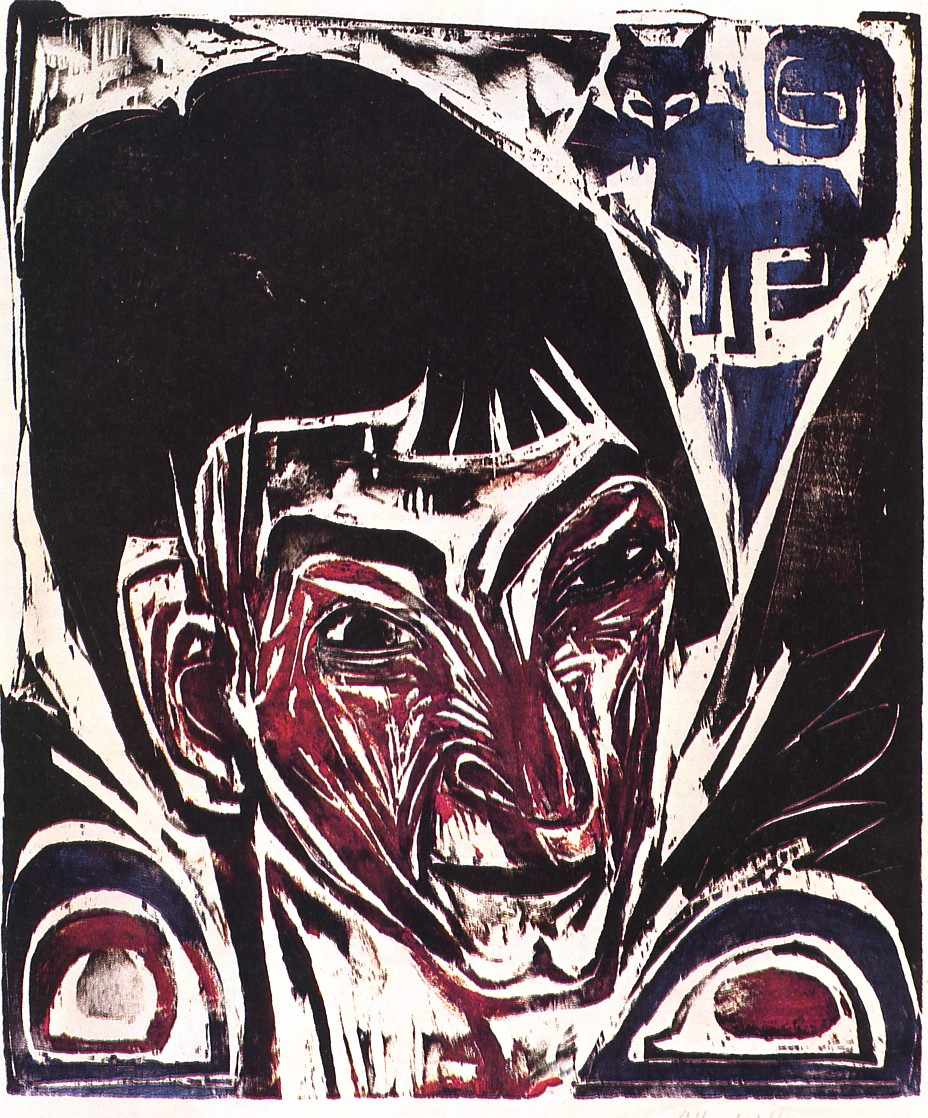
Ernst Ludwig Kirchner, Portrait of Otto Müller, 1915

Woodcut, a type of relief print, is the earliest printmaking technique. It was probably first developed as a means of printing patterns on cloth, and by the 5th century was used in China for printing text and images on paper. Woodcuts of images on paper developed around 1400 in Europe, and slightly later in Japan. These are the two areas where woodcut has been most extensively used purely as a process for making images without text.

The artist either draws a design directly on a plank of wood, or transfers a drawing done on paper to a plank of wood. Traditionally, the artist then handed the work to a technician, who then uses sharp carving tools to carve away the parts of the block that will not receive ink. In the Western tradition, the surface of the block is then inked with the use of a brayer; however, in the Japanese tradition, woodblocks were inked with a brush. Then a sheet of paper, perhaps slightly damp, is placed over the block. The block is then rubbed with a baren or spoon, or is run through a printing press. If the print is in color, separate blocks can be used for each color, or a technique called reduction printing can be used.

Reduction printing is a name used to describe the process of using one block to print several layers of color on one print. Both woodcuts and linocuts can employ reduction printing. This usually involves cutting a small amount of the block away, and then printing the block many times over on different sheets before washing the block, cutting more away and printing the next color on top. This allows the previous color to show through. This process can be repeated many times over. The advantages of this process are that only one block is needed, and that different components of an intricate design will line up perfectly. The disadvantage is that once the artist moves on to the next layer, no more prints can be made.

Another variation of woodcut printmaking is the cukil technique, made famous by the Taring Padi underground community in Java, Indonesia. Taring Padi Posters usually resemble intricately printed cartoon posters embedded with political messages. Images—usually resembling a visually complex scenario—are carved onto a wooden surface called cukilan, then smothered with printer's ink before pressing it onto media such as paper or canvas.

=== Engraving ===
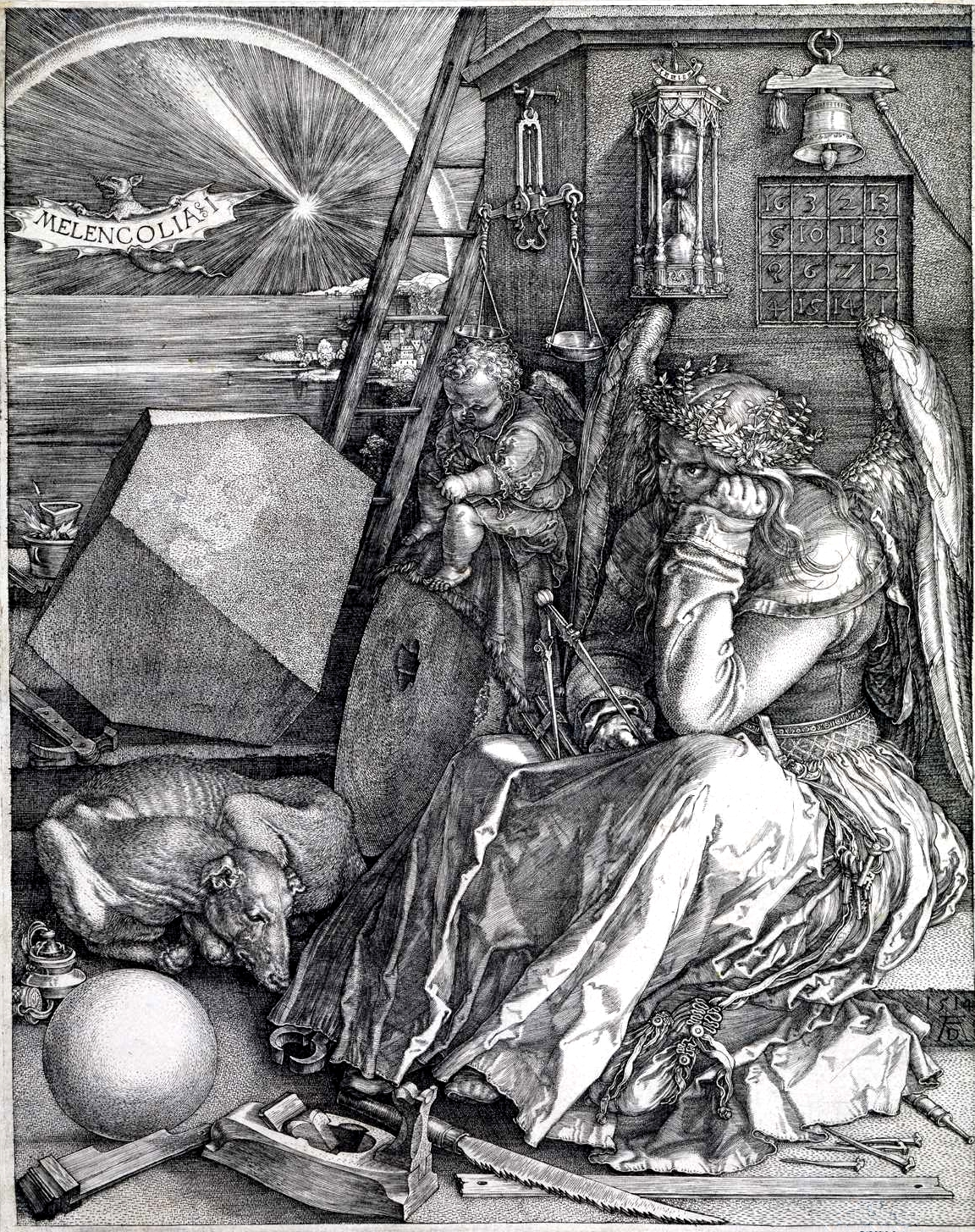
Melencolia I, 1514 engraving by Albrecht Dürer, one of the most important printmakers.

The process was developed in Germany in the 1430s from the engraving used by goldsmiths to decorate metalwork. Engravers use a hardened steel tool called a burin to cut the design into the surface of a metal plate, traditionally made of copper. Engraving using a burin is generally a difficult skill to learn.

Gravers come in a variety of shapes and sizes that yield different line types. The burin produces a unique and recognizable quality of line that is characterized by its steady, deliberate appearance and clean edges. Other tools such as mezzotint rockers, roulettes (a tool with a fine-toothed wheel) and burnishers (a tool used for making an object smooth or shiny by rubbing) are used for texturing effects.

To make a print, the engraved plate is inked all over, then the ink is wiped off the surface, leaving ink only in the engraved lines. The plate is then put through a high-pressure printing press together with a sheet of paper (often moistened to soften it). The paper picks up the ink from the engraved lines, making a print. The process can be repeated many times; typically several hundred impressions (copies) could be printed before the printing plate shows much sign of wear, except when drypoint, which gives much shallower lines, is used.

In the 20th century, true engraving was revived as a serious art form by artists including Stanley William Hayter whose Atelier 17 in Paris and New York City became the magnet for such artists as Pablo Picasso, Alberto Giacometti, Mauricio Lasansky and Joan Miró.

=== Etching ===
Artists using this technique include
- Albrecht Dürer
- Rembrandt
- Francisco Goya
- Wenceslaus Hollar
- Whistler
- Otto Dix
- James Ensor
- Edward Hopper
- Käthe Kollwitz
- Pablo Picasso
- Cy Twombly
- Lucas van Leyden

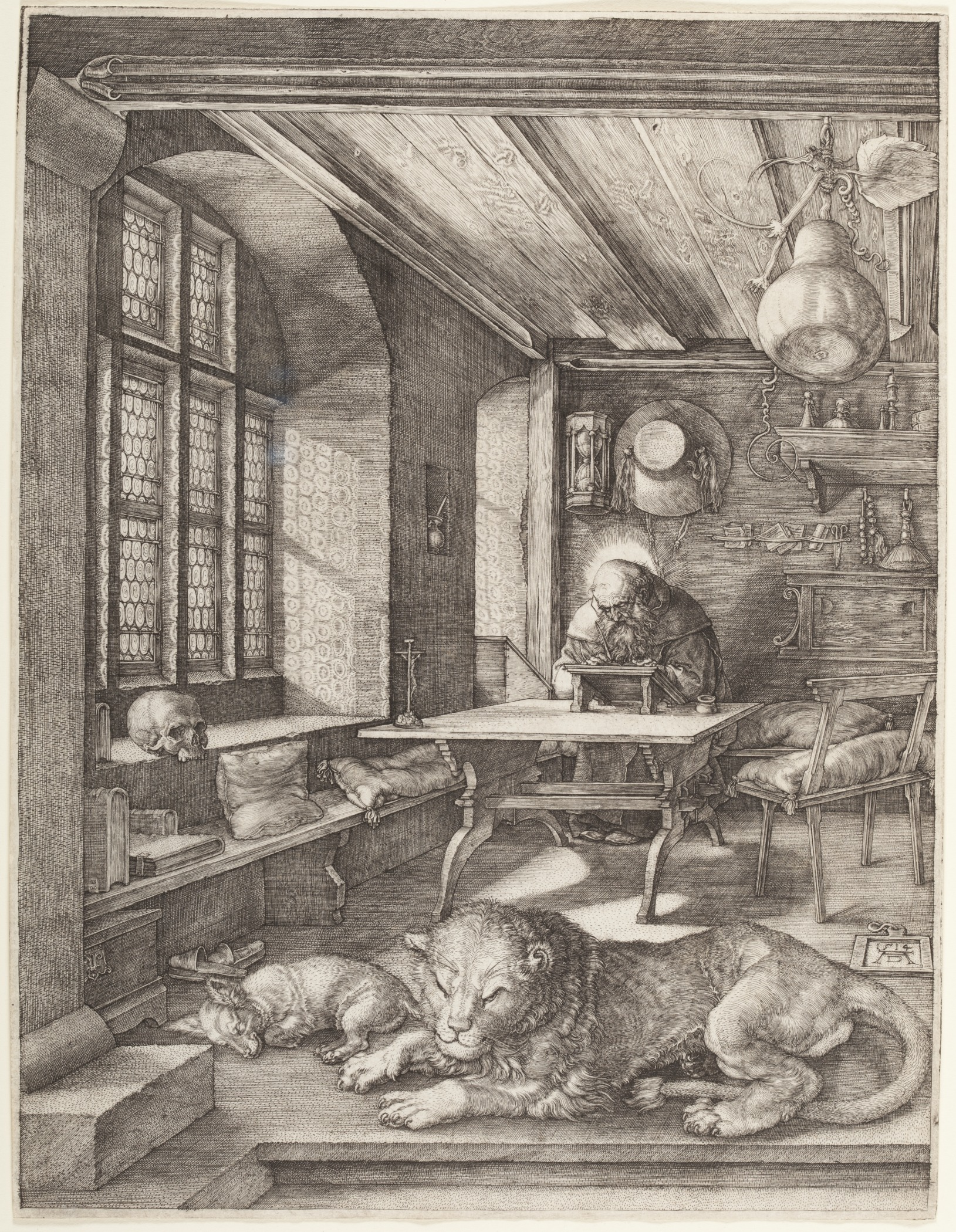
Albrecht Dürer, Saint Jerome in his Study, 1514.

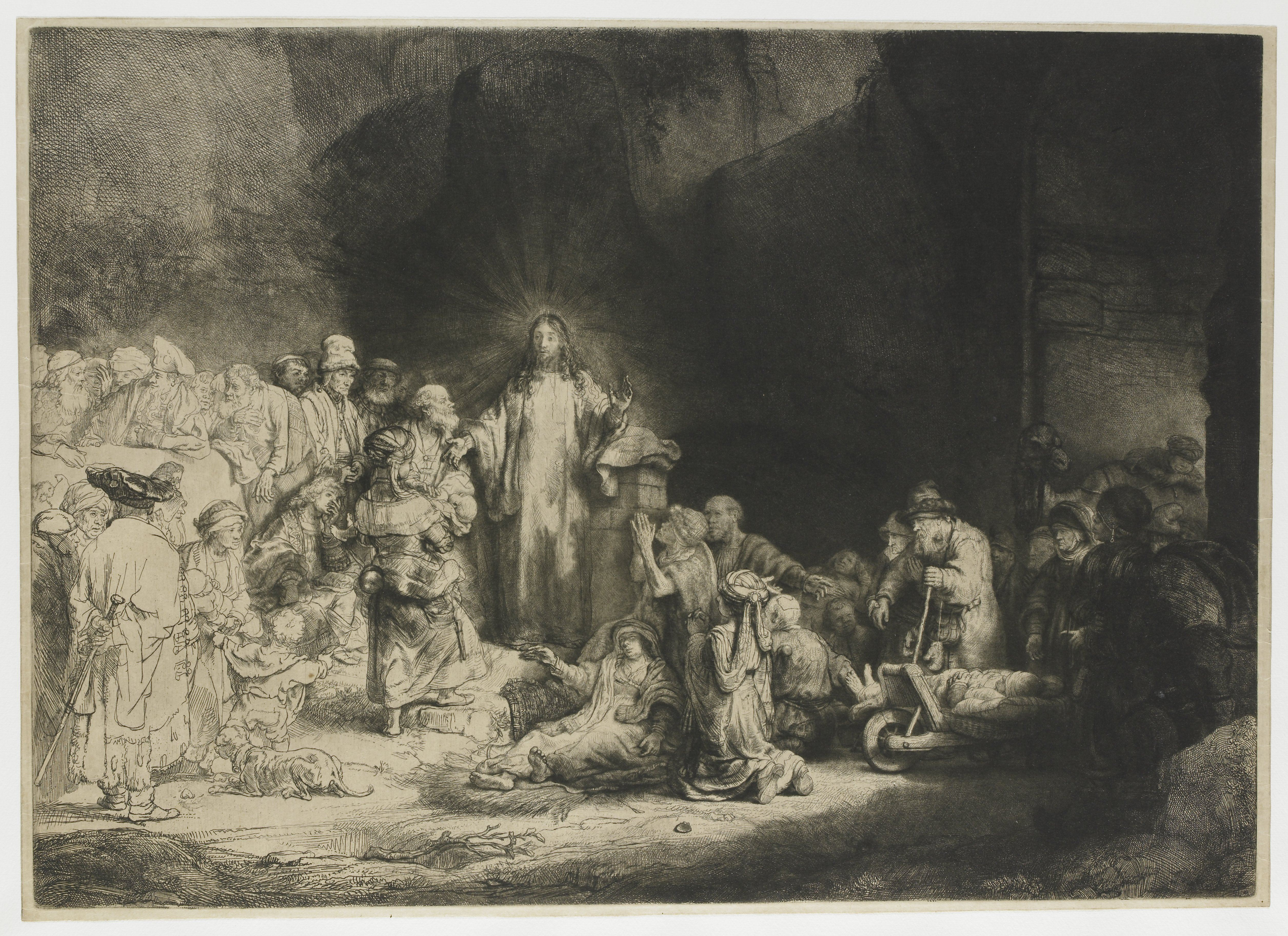
Rembrandt, Christ Preaching, (The Hundred Guilder print); etching c. 1648

Etching is part of the intaglio family. In pure etching, a metal plate (usually copper, zinc, or steel) is covered with a waxy or acrylic ground. The artist then draws through the ground with a pointed etching needle, exposing the metal. The plate is then etched by dipping it in a bath of etchant (e.g. nitric acid or ferric chloride). The etchant "bites" into the exposed metal, leaving behind lines in the plate. The remaining ground is then cleaned off the plate, and the printing process is then just the same as for engraving.

Although the first dated etching is by Albrecht Dürer in 1515, the process is believed to have been invented by Daniel Hopfer (c. 1470–1536) of Augsburg, Germany, who decorated armor in this way, and applied the method to printmaking. Etching soon came to challenge engraving as the most popular printmaking medium. Its great advantage was that, unlike engraving which requires special skill in metalworking, etching is relatively easy to learn for an artist trained in drawing.

Etching prints are generally linear and often contain fine detail and contours. Lines can vary from smooth to sketchy. An etching is the opposite of a woodcut in that the raised portions of an etching remain blank while the crevices hold ink.

A non-toxic form of etching that does not involve an acid is Electroetching.

=== Mezzotint ===
Artists using this technique include
- John Martin
- Ludwig von Siegen
- John Smith
- Wallerant Vaillant
- Carol Wax

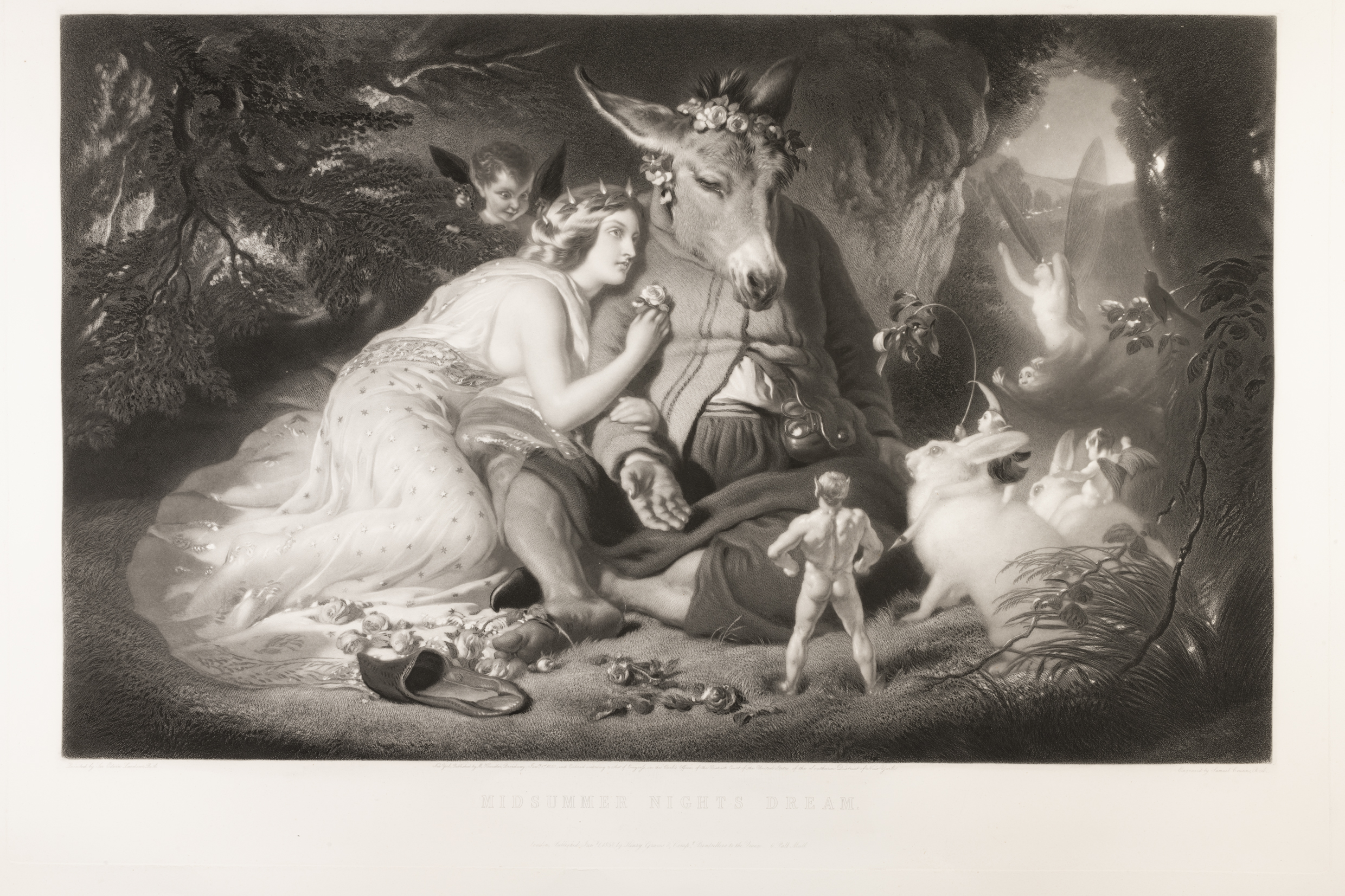
A Midsummer Night’s Dream (Bottom and Titania) by Samuel Cousins, mezzotint on paper (1801-1887).

An intaglio variant of engraving in which the image is formed from subtle gradations of light and shade. Mezzotint—from the Italian mezzo ("half") and tinta ("tone")—is a "dark manner" form of printmaking, which requires artists to work from dark to light. To create a mezzotint, the surface of a copper printing plate is roughened evenly all over with the aid of a tool known as a rocker; the image is then formed by smoothing the surface with a tool known as a burnisher. When inked, the roughened areas of the plate will hold more ink and print more darkly, while smoother areas of the plate hold less or no ink, and will print more lightly or not at all. It is, however, possible to create the image by only roughening the plate selectively, so working from light to dark.

Mezzotint is known for the luxurious quality of its tones: first, because an evenly, finely roughened surface holds a lot of ink, allowing deep solid colors to be printed; secondly because the process of smoothing the texture with burin, burnisher and scraper allows fine gradations in tone to be developed.

The mezzotint printmaking method was invented by Ludwig von Siegen (1609–1680). The process was used widely in England from the mid-eighteenth century, to reproduce oil paintings and in particular portraits.

=== Aquatint ===
Artists using this technique include
- Francisco Goya
- Thomas Rowlandson
- Jean-Baptiste Le Prince
- William Daniell
- Norman Ackroyd

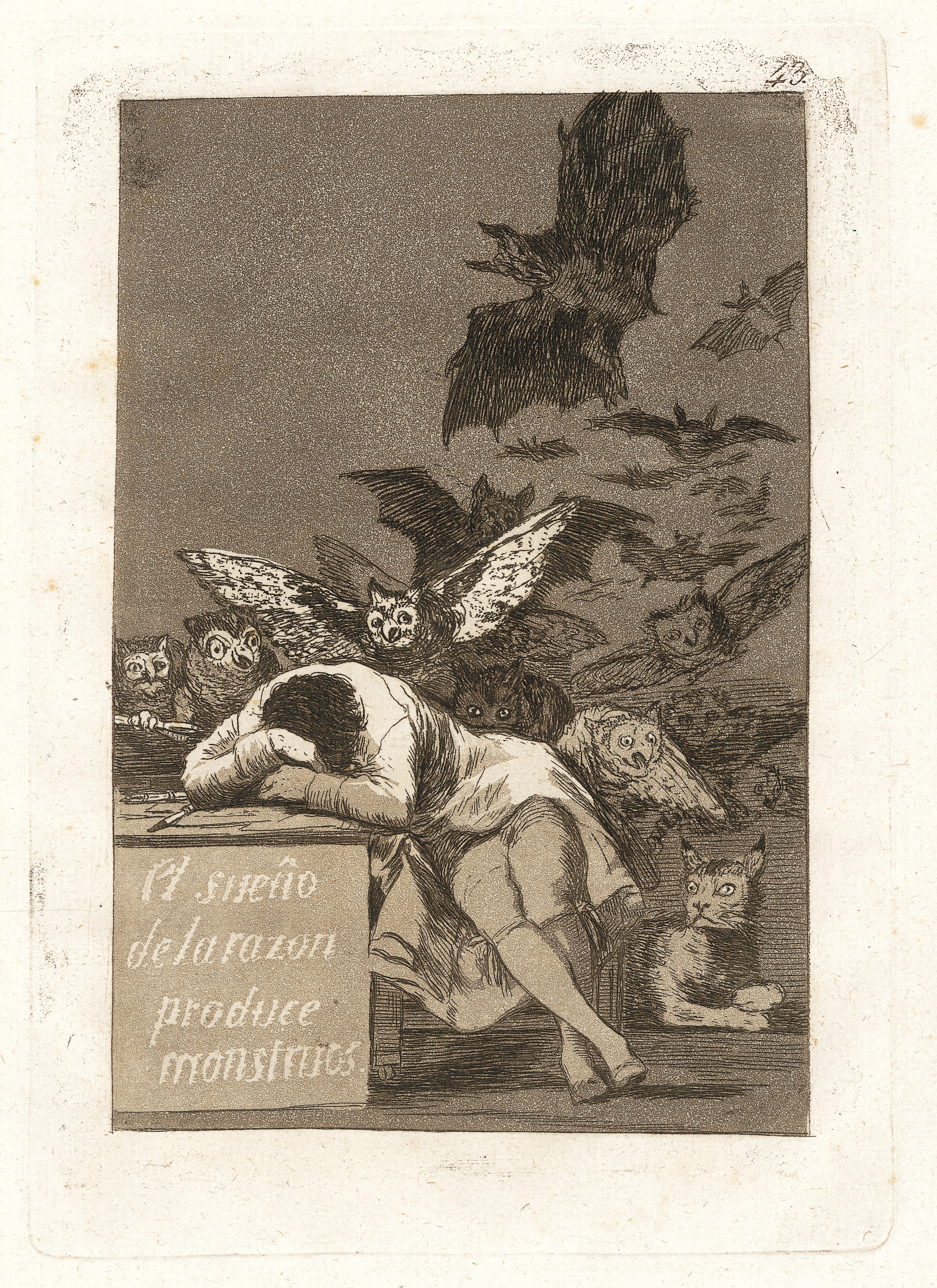
The sleep of Reason creates monsters, etching and aquatint by Francisco Goya, c. 1797–98

A tonal technique typically used in conjunction with Intaglio techniques, especially etching, and printed in the same way. Like etching, the aquatint technique involves the application of acid to make marks in a metal plate. Where the etching technique uses a needle to make lines that retain ink, traditional aquatint relies on powdered rosin which is acid-resistant in the ground to create a tonal effect. The rosin is applied in a light dusting by a fan booth, the rosin is then cooked until set on the plate. At this time the rosin can be burnished or scratched out to affect its tonal qualities. The plate is then exposed to acid, to which the rosin particles are resistant, and tonal variation is controlled by the level of acid exposure over large areas, and thus the image is shaped by large sections at a time. Very often it is combined with conventional etching. Printing gradually wears away the rosin grain, and many fewer impressions can be printed than in the traditional intaglio techniques before the tonal contrasts weaken, perhaps only 100. The popularity of the technique in the 19th century, combined with this weakness, probably played a role in the rise of the limited edition print.

Contemporary printmakers also sometimes use airbrushed asphaltum or spray paint, as well as other non toxic techniques, to achieve aquatint due to rosin boxes posing a fire hazard.

Goya used aquatint for most of his prints. After his death, later printings wore away the aquatint grain almost completely, leaving only the etched lines and faint tonal shadows.

=== Drypoint ===
Artists using this technique include
- Mary Cassatt
- Francis Seymour Haden
- Master of the Housebook
- Richard Spare
- William Lionel Wyllie

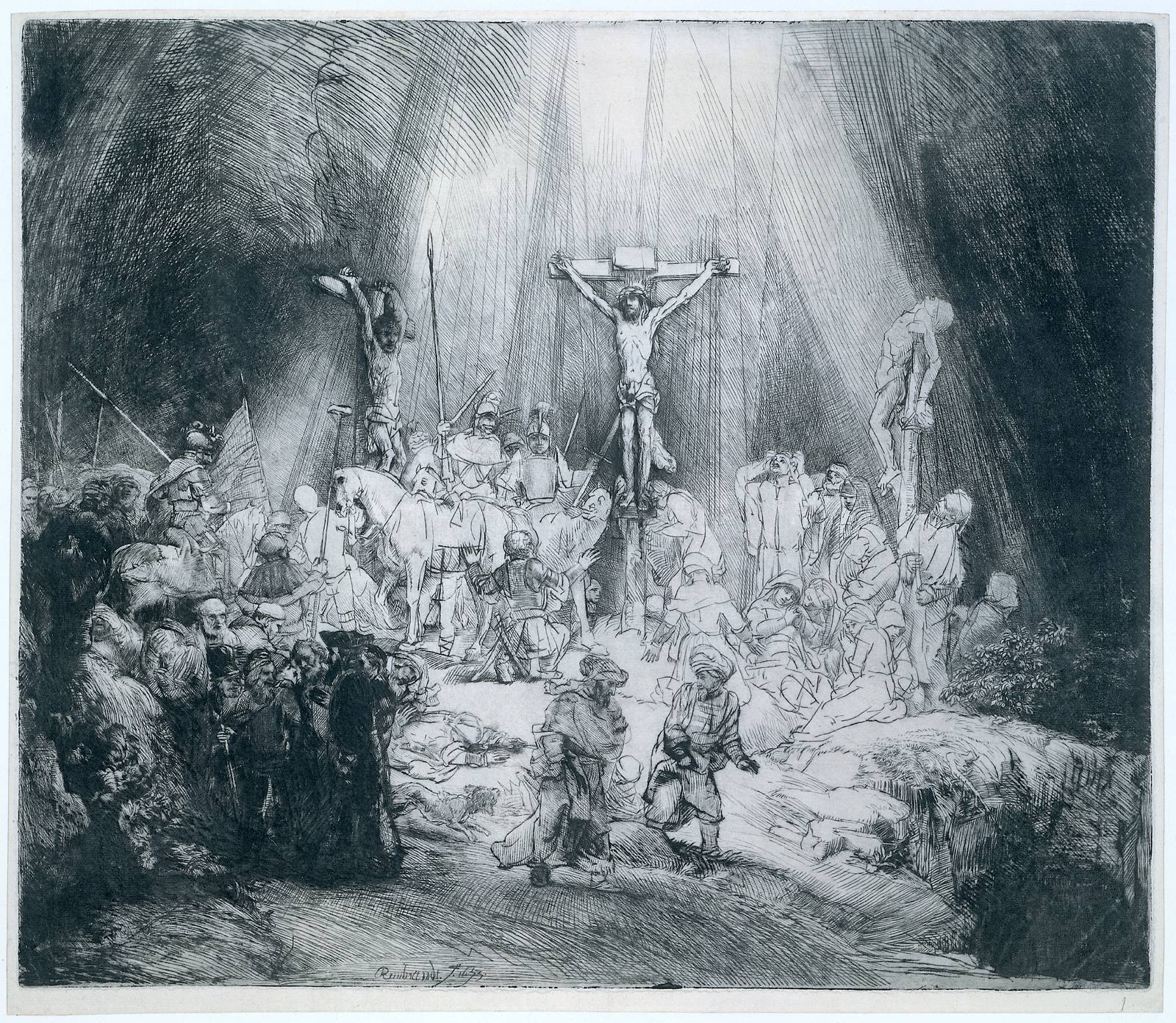
The Three Crosses, 1653 drypoint by Rembrandt

A variant of engraving, done with a sharp point, rather than a v-shaped burin. While engraved lines are very smooth and hard-edged, drypoint scratching leaves a rough burr at the edges of each line. This burr gives drypoint prints a characteristically soft, and sometimes blurry, line quality. Because the pressure of printing quickly destroys the burr, drypoint is useful only for very small editions, as few as ten or twenty impressions. To counter this, and allow for longer print runs, electro-plating (here called steelfacing) has been used since the nineteenth century to harden the surface of a plate.

The technique appears to have been invented by the Housebook Master, a south German fifteenth-century artist, all of whose prints are in drypoint only. Among the most famous artists of the old master print, Albrecht Dürer produced three drypoints before abandoning the technique; Rembrandt used it frequently, but usually in conjunction with etching and engraving.

=== Lithography ===
Artists using this technique include
- Honoré Daumier
- Vincent van Gogh
- George Bellows
- Pierre Bonnard
- Edvard Munch
- Emil Nolde
- Pablo Picasso
- Odilon Redon
- Henri de Toulouse-Lautrec
- Salvador Dalí
- M. C. Escher
- Willem de Kooning
- Joan Miró
- Stow Wengenroth
- Elaine de Kooning
- Louise Nevelson

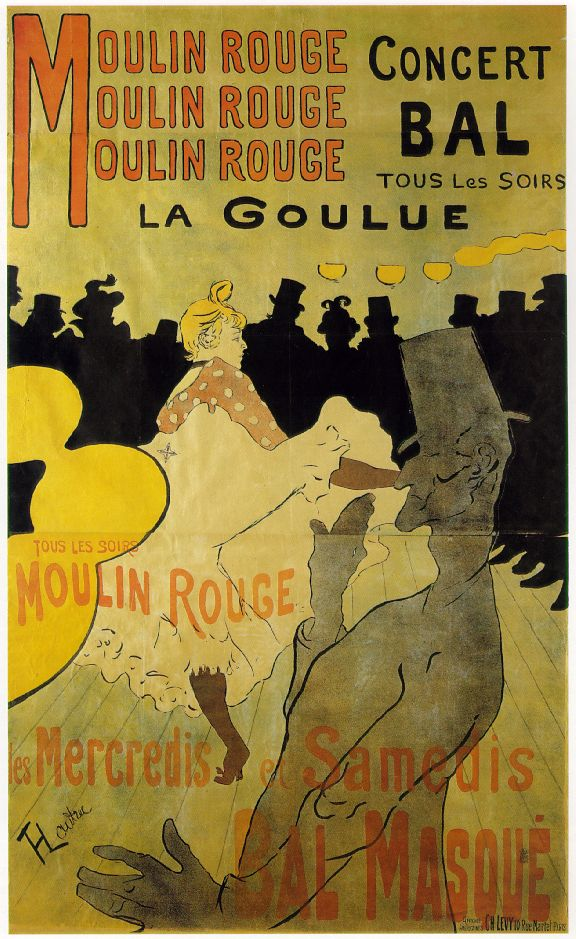
La Goulue, Lithograph poster by Toulouse-Lautrec (1891)

Lithography is a technique invented in 1798 by Alois Senefelder and based on the chemical repulsion of oil and water. A porous surface, normally limestone, is used; the image is drawn on the limestone with a greasy medium. Acid is applied, transferring the grease-protected design to the limestone, leaving the image 'burned' into the surface. Gum arabic, a water-soluble substance, is then applied, sealing the surface of the stone not covered with the drawing medium. The stone is wetted, with water staying only on the surface not covered in grease-based residue of the drawing; the stone is then 'rolled up', meaning oil ink is applied with a roller covering the entire surface; since water repels the oil in the ink, the ink adheres only to the greasy parts, perfectly inking the image. A sheet of dry paper is placed on the surface, and the image is transferred to the paper by the pressure of the printing press. Lithography is known for its ability to capture fine gradations in shading and very small detail.

In the United States, fine art lithography revived from the late 1950s through workshops that paired artists with master printers. In 1957 Tatyana Grosman founded Universal Limited Art Editions on Long Island and persuaded vanguard New York artists including Jasper Johns, Robert Rauschenberg, Lee Bontecou and Barnett Newman to take up what was then seen as an old-fashioned medium; by the mid-1960s such collaborations at ULAE and similar American workshops had produced an explosion of contemporary printed art. In 1960 June Wayne founded the Tamarind Lithography Workshop in Los Angeles, with Ford Foundation funding, specifically to train master printers.

==== Variations of Lithography ====
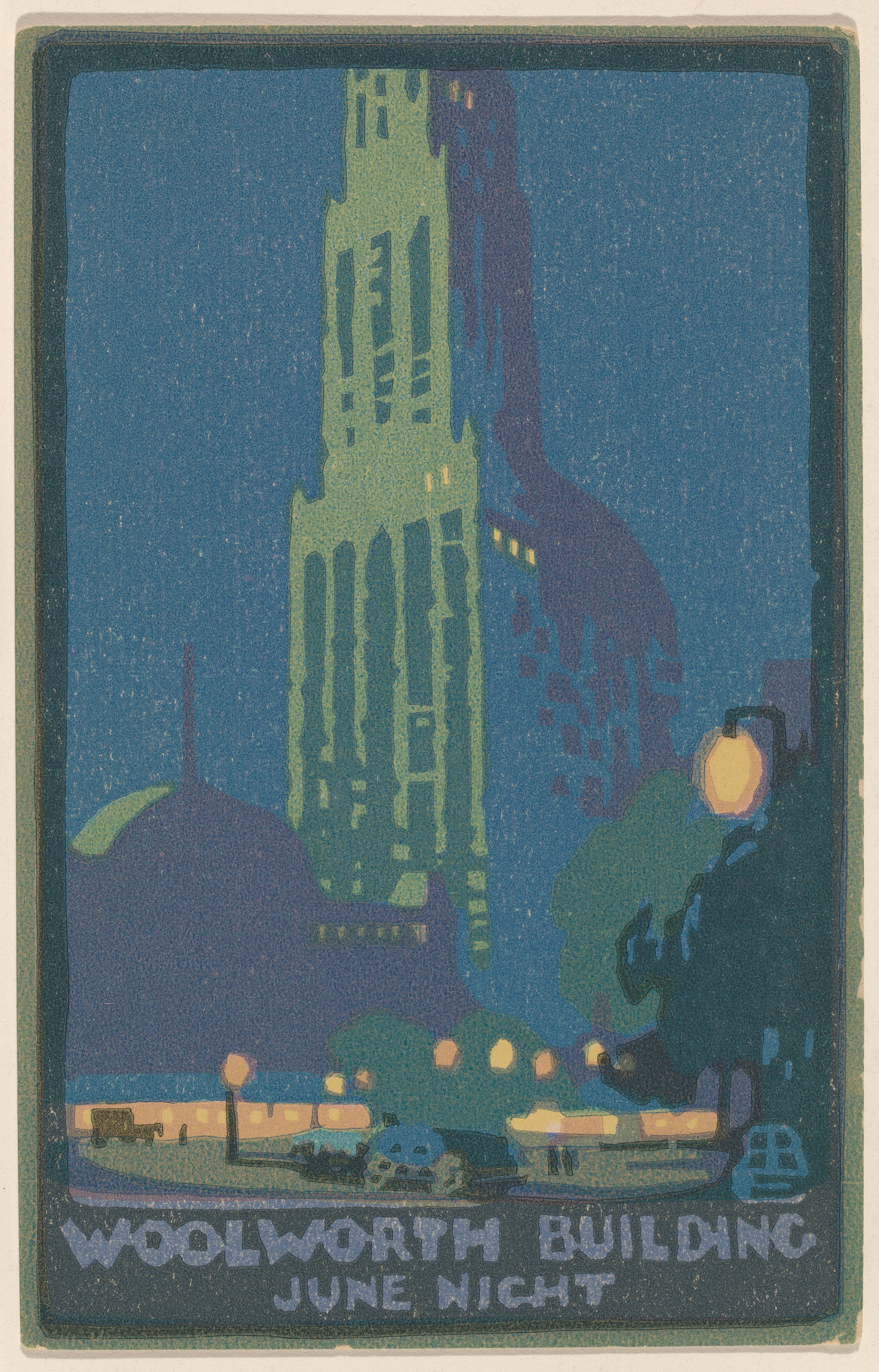
Rachel Robinson Elmer, halftone offset lithograph, Woolworth Building June Night, 1916, The National Gallery of Art, Washington, D.C.

Photo-lithography captures an image by photographic processes on metal plates; printing is more or less carried out in the same way as stone lithography.

Halftone lithography produces an image that illustrates a gradient-like quality.

Mokulito is a form of lithography on wood instead of limestone. It was invented by Seishi Ozaku in the 1970s in Japan and was originally called Mokurito.

=== Screenprinting ===
Artists using this technique include
- Josef Albers
- Ralston Crawford
- Gene Davis
- Robert Indiana
- Roy Lichtenstein
- Julian Opie
- Bridget Riley
- Edward Ruscha
- Andy Warhol

Screen printing (occasionally known as "silkscreen", or "serigraphy") creates prints by using a fabric stencil technique; ink is simply pushed through the stencil against the surface of the paper, most often with the aid of a squeegee. Generally, the technique uses a natural or synthetic 'mesh' fabric stretched tightly across a rectangular 'frame,' much like a stretched canvas. The fabric can be silk, nylon monofilament, multifilament polyester, or even stainless steel. While commercial screen printing often requires high-tech, mechanical apparatuses and calibrated materials, printmakers value it for the "Do It Yourself" approach, low technical requirements, and high-quality results. The essential tools required are a squeegee, a mesh fabric, a frame, and a stencil. Unlike many other printmaking processes, a printing press is not required, as screen printing is essentially stencil printing.

Screen printing may be adapted to printing on a variety of materials, from paper, cloth, and canvas to rubber, glass, and metal. Artists have used the technique to print on bottles, on slabs of granite, directly onto walls, and to reproduce images on textiles which would distort under pressure from printing presses.

=== Monotype ===
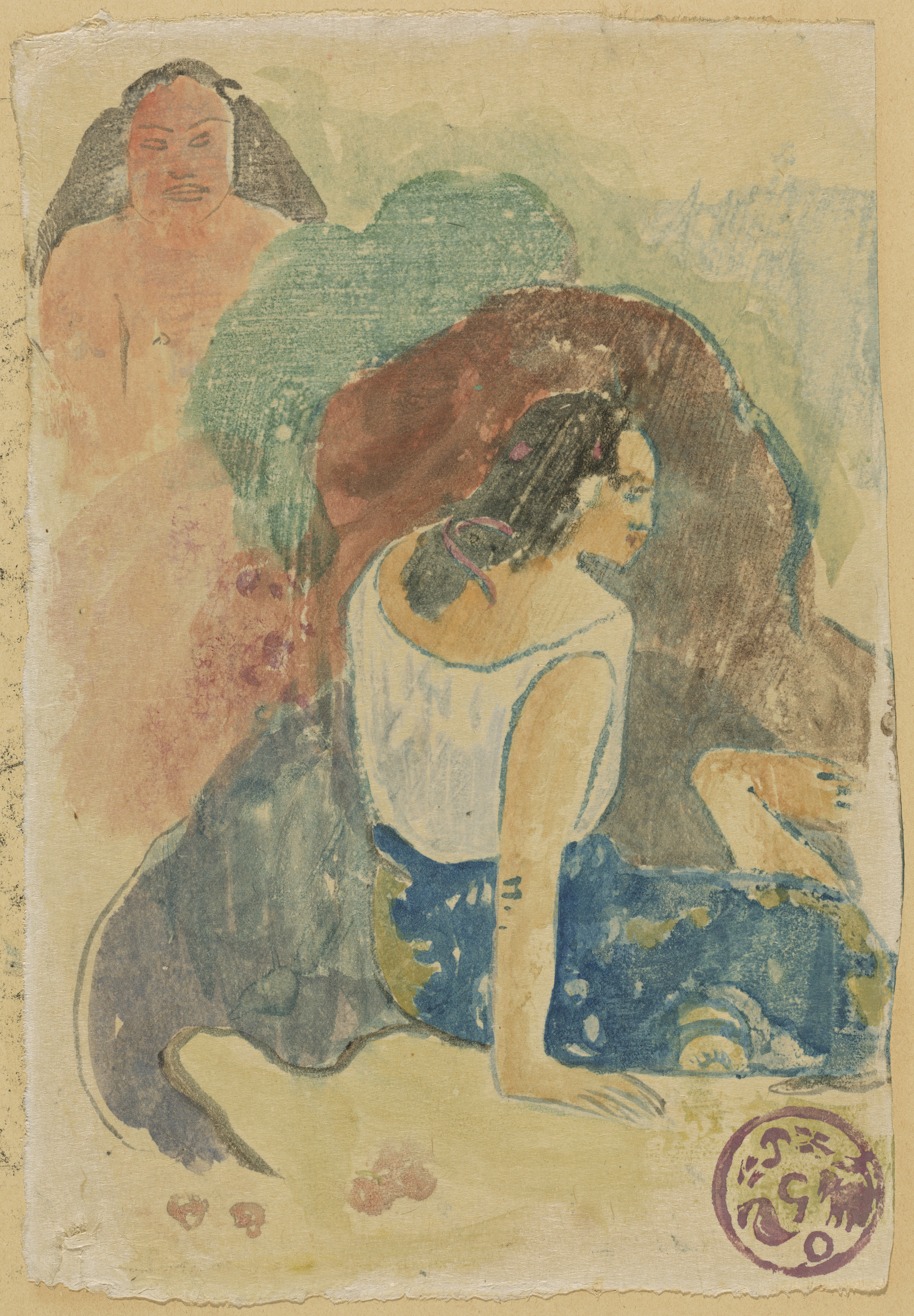
Paul Gauguin, Arearea no Varua Ino (Words of the Devil), watercolor monotype on Japan paper mounted on cardboard, 1894, The National Gallery of Art, Washington, D.C.

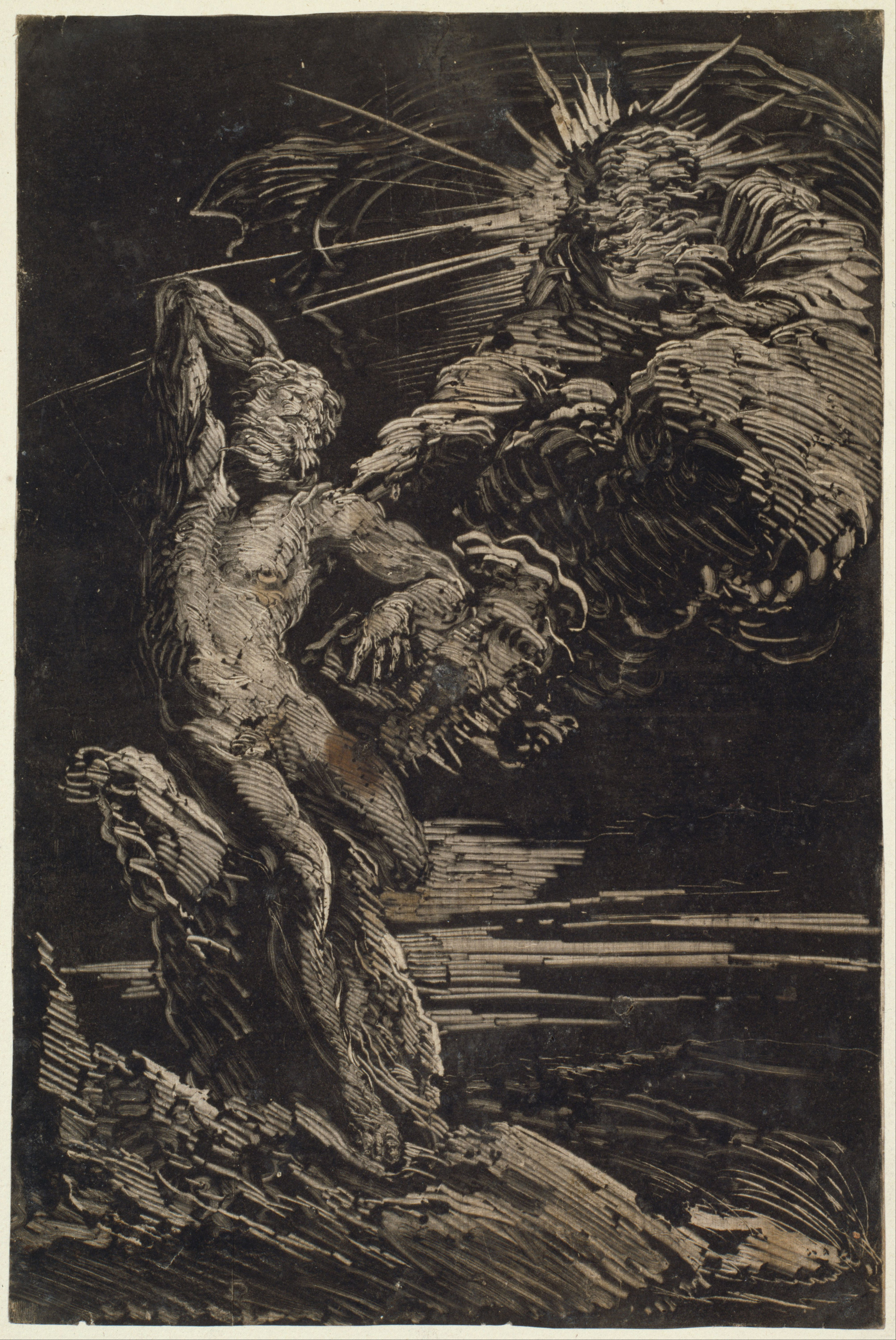
Monotype by the technique's inventor, Giovanni Benedetto Castiglione, The Creation of Adam, c 1642

Monotyping is a type of printmaking made by drawing or painting on a smooth, non-absorbent surface. The surface, or matrix, was historically a copper etching plate, but in contemporary work it can vary from zinc or glass to acrylic glass. The image is then transferred onto a sheet of paper by pressing the two together, usually using a printing-press. Monotypes can also be created by inking an entire surface and then, using brushes or rags, removing ink to create a subtractive image, e.g. creating lights from a field of opaque color. The inks used may be oil based or water based. With oil based inks, the paper may be dry, in which case the image has more contrast, or the paper may be damp, in which case the image has a 10 percent greater range of tones.

Unlike monoprinting, monotyping produces a unique print, or monotype, because most of the ink is removed during the initial pressing. Although subsequent reprintings are sometimes possible, they differ greatly from the first print and are generally considered inferior. A second print from the original plate is called a "ghost print" or "cognate". Stencils, watercolor, solvents, brushes, and other tools are often used to embellish a monotype print. Monotypes are often spontaneously executed and with no preliminary sketch.

Monotypes are the most painterly method among the printmaking techniques, a unique print that is essentially a printed painting. The principal characteristic of this medium is found in its spontaneity and its combination of printmaking, painting, and drawing media.

=== Monoprint ===
Monoprinting is a form of printmaking that uses a matrix such as a woodblock, litho stone, or copper plate, but produces impressions that are unique. Multiple unique impressions printed from a single matrix are sometimes known as a variable edition. There are many techniques used in monoprinting, including collagraph, collage, hand-painted additions, and a form of tracing by which thick ink is laid down on a table, paper is placed on the ink, and the back of the paper is drawn on, transferring the ink to the paper. Monoprints can also be made by altering the type, color, and viscosity of the ink used to create different prints. Traditional printmaking techniques, such as lithography, woodcut, and intaglio, can be used to make monoprints.

=== Mixed-media prints ===
Mixed-media prints may use multiple traditional printmaking processes such as etching, woodcut, letterpress, silkscreen, or even monoprinting in the creation of the print. They may also incorporate elements of chine colle, collage, or painted areas, and may be unique, i.e. one-off, non-editioned, prints. Mixed-media prints are often experimental prints and may be printed on unusual, non-traditional surfaces.

=== Digital prints ===
Artists using this technique include
- Istvan Horkay
- Ralph Goings
- Enrique Chagoya

Digital prints refer to images printed using digital printers such as inkjet printers instead of a traditional printing press. Images can be printed to a variety of substrates including paper, cloth, or plastic canvas.

==== Dye-based inks ====
Dye-based inks are organic (not mineral) dissolved and mixed into a liquid. Although most are synthetic, derived from petroleum, they can be made from vegetable or animal sources. Dyes are well suited for textiles where the liquid dye penetrates and chemically bonds to the fiber. Because of the deep penetration, more layers of material must lose their color before the fading is apparent. Dyes, however, are not suitable for the relatively thin layers of ink laid out on the surface of a print.

==== Pigment-based inks ====
Pigment is a finely ground, particulate substance which, when mixed or ground into a liquid to make ink or paint, does not dissolve, but remains dispersed or suspended in the liquid. Pigments are categorized as either inorganic (mineral) or organic (synthetic). Pigment-based inks have a much longer permanence than dye-based inks.

==== Giclée ====
Giclée (pron.: /ʒiːˈkleɪ/ zhee-KLAY or /dʒiːˈkleɪ/), is a neologism coined in 1991 by printmaker Jack Duganne for digital prints made on inkjet printers. Originally associated with early dye-based printers, it now more often refers to pigment-based prints. The word is based on the French word gicleur, which means "nozzle". Today fine art prints produced on large format ink-jet machines using the CcMmYK color model are generally called "Giclée".

=== Foil imaging ===
In art, foil imaging is a printmaking technique made using the Iowa Foil Printer, developed by Virginia A. Myers from the commercial foil stamping process. This uses gold leaf and acrylic foil in the printmaking process.

=== Direct-to-garment printing (DTG printing) ===
Direct-to-garment printing (DTG) is a process of printing on textiles using specialized aqueous ink jet technology. DTG printers typically have a platen designed to hold the garment in a fixed position, and the printer inks are jetted or sprayed onto the textile by the print head.

== Color ==
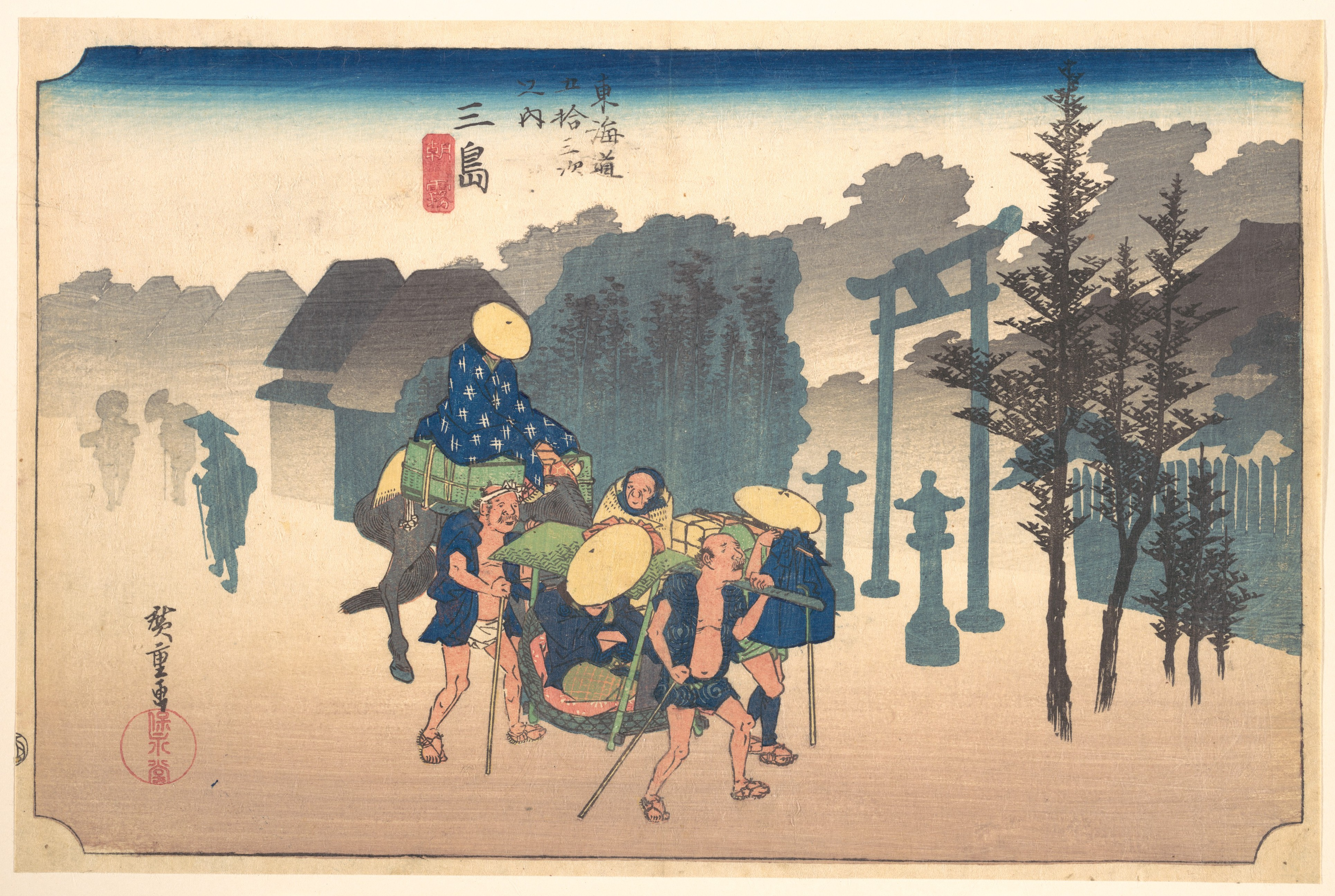
Hiroshige, Morning Mist

Printmakers apply color to their prints in many different ways. Some coloring techniques include positive surface roll, negative surface roll, and A la poupée. Often color in printmaking that involves etching, screen printing, woodcut, or linocut is applied by either using separate plates, blocks or screens or by using a reductionist approach. In multiple plate color techniques, a number of plates, screens or blocks are produced, each providing a different color. Each separate plate, screen, or block will be inked up in a different color and applied in a particular sequence to produce the entire picture. On average about three to four plates are produced, but there are occasions where a printmaker may use up to seven plates. Every application of another plate of color will interact with the color already applied to the paper, and this must be kept in mind when producing the separation of colors. The lightest colors are often applied first, and then darker colors successively until the darkest.

The reductionist approach to producing color is to start with a lino or wood block that is either blank or with a simple etching. Upon each printing of color the printmaker will then further cut into the lino or woodblock removing more material and then apply another color and reprint. Each successive removal of lino or wood from the block will expose the already printed color to the viewer of the print. Picasso is often cited as the inventor of reduction printmaking, although there is evidence of this method in use 25 years before Picasso's linocuts.

The subtractive color concept is also used in offset or digital print and is present in bitmap or vectorial software in CMYK or other color spaces.

== Registration ==
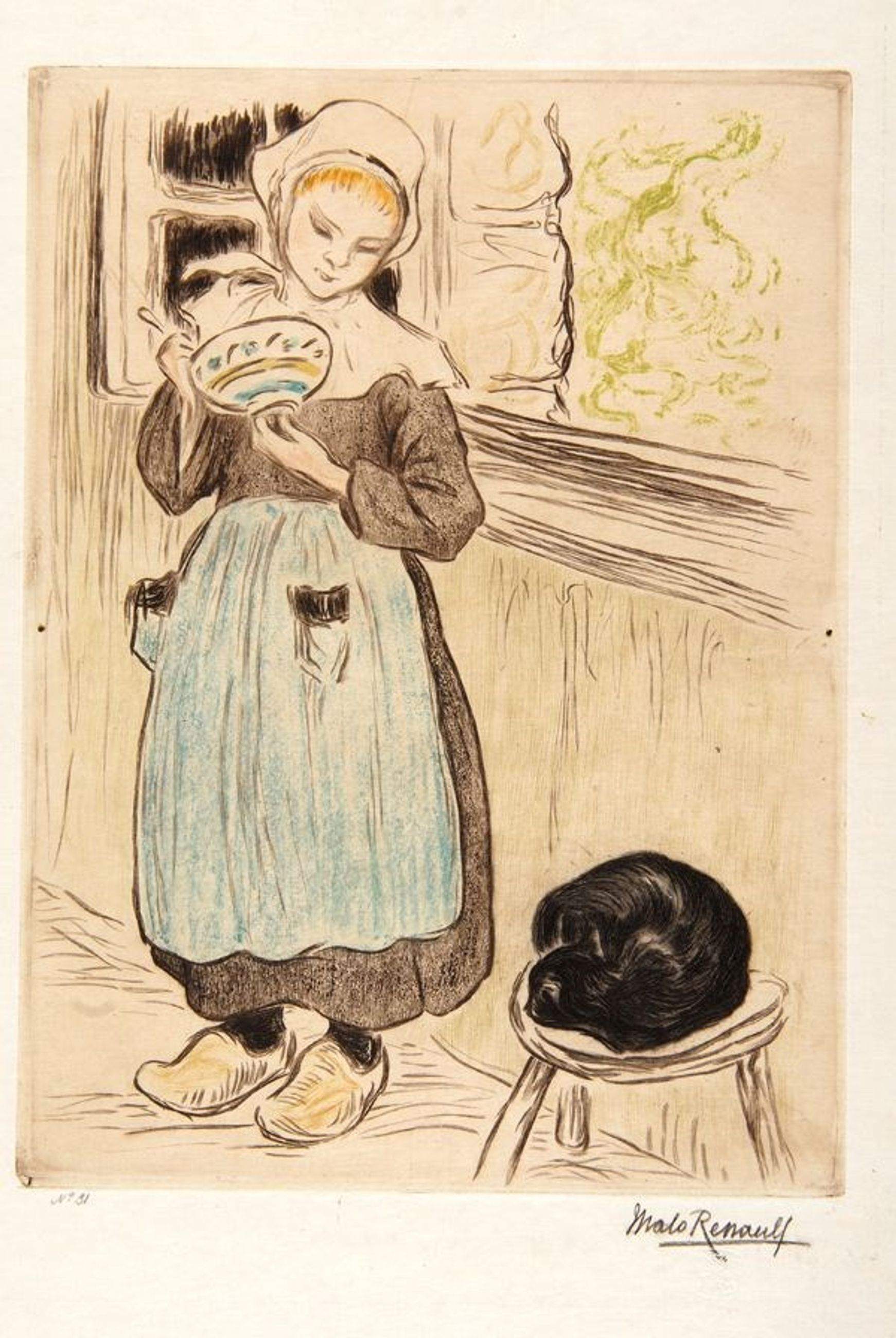
You can see the two marking holes on the right and left edges halfway up to allow the precise superposition of the dies for each color

In printmaking processes requiring more than one application of ink or other medium, the problem exists as to how to line up properly areas of an image to receive ink in each application. The most obvious example of this would be a multi-color image in which each color is applied in a separate step.

The lining up of the results of each step in a multistep printmaking process is called "registration." Proper registration results in the various components of an image being in their proper place. But, for artistic reasons, improper registration is not necessarily the ruination of an image. Andy Warhol was known to intentionally employ improper registration.

This can vary significantly from process to process. This involves the matrices of different colors (generally three or four) being printed successively on the paper in a correct alignment to provide the print in color.

== Protective printmaking equipment ==
Protective clothing is very important for printmakers who engage in etching and lithography (closed toed shoes and long pants). Whereas in the past printmakers put their plates in and out of acid baths with their bare hands, today printmakers use rubber gloves. They also wear industrial respirators for protection from caustic vapors. Most acid baths are built with ventilation hoods above them.

Protective respirators and masks should have particle filters, particularly for aquatinting. As a part of the aquatinting process, a printmaker is often exposed to rosin powder. Rosin is a serious health hazard, especially to printmakers who, in the past, simply used to hold their breath using an aquatinting booth.

== Print preservation ==
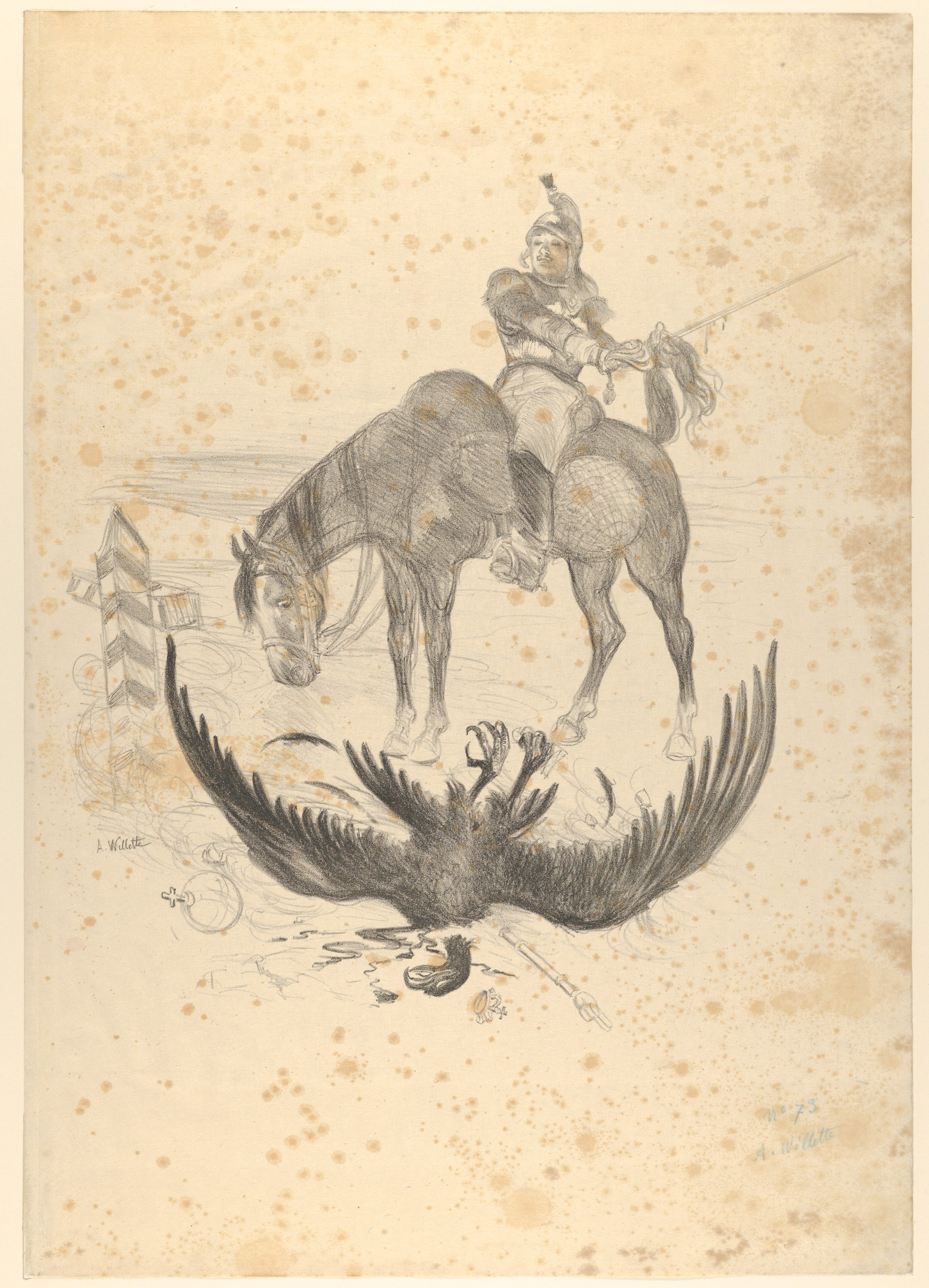
Bad foxing (brown spots) in an anti-German lithograph of 1895 by Adolphe Willette

Modern prints on paper protected from the sun and moisture will last for centuries. Works on paper are highly sensitive to environmental factors and handling, making them susceptible to various condition issues. Prints made using newer alkaline and acid-free paper have a life expectancy of over 1,000 years for the best paper and 500 years for average grades. When it comes to older prints, the condition of a print largely depends on the technique used to make the paper. Prints that are several hundred years old may be in better condition than prints that are less than 50 years old. Many older prints will yellow or brown over time owing to acids in the paper and any matting or backing papers.

Foxing is the appearance of brown spots or blotches in the paper, caused either by mold or chemical reactions. To preserve/restore older prints, washing, deacidification and treatment with stain-reducing agents may be in order. Prints in color are especially susceptible to damage from excessive light. Further, if the print is framed, archival or conservation grade picture mats are essential since acids within older or inexpensive matting will attack a print even if the print was produced using acid-free paper. Color prints can be susceptible to fading depending on the type of inks used. Lighting of sensitive prints should be limited to 50 lux (5 foot-candles) or less and artificial lights can be equipped with UV-filtering sleeves or tubes.

Prints onto animal skins (vellum) should also be maintained at a humidity level between 25% and 40%. Prints onto silk are particularly sensitive to any light including camera flashes.

== See also ==
- Artist's proof
- Banhua, Chinese printmaking
- Carborundum printmaking
- Graphic design
- Line engraving
- List of printmakers
- Old master print
- Shin hanga
- Sosaku hanga
- Timeline of 20th century printmaking in America
- Ukiyo-e
- Visual arts

=== Printmakers by nationality ===
- Engravers by nationality
- Etchers by nationality
- Printmakers by nationality
