= Mokulito =

Lithographic printmaking technique on a wooden matrix

Mokulito or Mokurito (from Japanese 木材 (mokuzai) 'wood' and lito as an abbreviation of lithography), also known as Wood Lithography, is a method of lithographic (and sometimes planographic) printmaking where a drawing is created on a wooden matrix in an oily medium, which is then used to make a print. In all kinds of lithography, because oil and water do not mix, the plate can be prepared by chemical processes so that the printing ink sticks to the drawn areas, and is repelled from the blank areas. In contrast to traditional lithography, which requires a limestone block, the tools for mokulito are easily accessible to printmakers without specialized equipment.

The technique was invented in the 1970s by Ozaku Seishi, a Japanese printmaker teaching at Tama Art University in Tokyo, Japan.

== Technique ==
As a relatively novel printmaking technique, there is great variance in the ways that printmakers work in the medium. However, most printmakers use some variation on the following steps.

1. A wood plate matrix, preferably made of hardwood plywood, is sanded flat, in order to make the surface suitable for drawing, and to remove any oil on the surface left by fingerprints.
2. A drawing is created on the matrix (in reverse) using an oil-based medium, such as tusche, liquid ground, acrylic paint, butter, soap, carbon copy paper, or other improvised household materials. The printmaker must be cautious to avoid unintended oily marks on the plate, such as those left by fingerprints, as they will show in the final result.
3. The drawing is gently dusted with talc powder, then wiped clean. This makes the drawing more receptive for gum arabic.
4. Optionally, the block may be carved in relief at this point, as in traditional woodblock printmaking, to further enhance desired white areas.
5. The plate is coated with gum arabic and allowed to dry.
6. Excess gum arabic is rinsed from the plate.
7. A thin layer of ink is rolled onto the surface of the plate. Any areas where excess ink is building up in undesired areas of the plate are cleaned by gently rinsing with water or wiping with a damp sponge.
8. A dampened sheet of paper is placed onto the plate. With pressure applied (either by hand or with an etching press) the ink is transferred from the plate to the paper.

== Comparison to Other Printmaking Methods ==
Mokulito works on the same principles as traditional lithography, but has several distinct characteristics. The most important advantage of mokulito is that, because it requires only wood as a matrix, it is much more accessible to the home or hobbyist printmaker than traditional lithography, which requires a limestone block.

In contrast to relief woodcuts, mokulito offers the ability to create tonal gradations and very expressive, painterly marks, as a wide variety of tools can be used to create the original drawing on the plate.

Another advantage of mokulito is that it can be combined with relief woodcuts on the same block. The matrix can be carved during the preparation for the lithographic process to enhance contrast with the natural plate tone the process produces. The plate may also be carved after the mokulito print has been made, to produce further layers of a reduction woodcut print.

Unique to mokulito is the wood grain potentially being visible, depending on the type of wood used in the matrix, as a plate tone in the final image.

The disadvantages of mokulito are similar to those of kitchen lithography, a lithographic process where the matrix is a sheet of aluminum foil. The wooden matrix is very unpredictable when compared to stone lithography, and can make the printing surface degrade during use, limiting the printmaker to a small edition.
