= Dactylispa issikii =

Scientific classification
- Kingdom: Animalia
- Phylum: Arthropoda
- Class: Insecta
- Order: Coleoptera
- Suborder: Polyphaga
- Infraorder: Cucujiformia
- Family: Chrysomelidae
- Genus: Dactylispa
- Species: D. issikii

Binomial name
- Dactylispa issikii Chûjô, 1938

Synonyms
- Dactylispa kaulina Gressitt, 1950

Species of beetle

Dactylispa issikii is a species of beetle of the family Chrysomelidae. It is found in China (Fujian, Guangdong, Guangxi, Jiangxi, Zhejiang), Japan and Korea.

== Life history ==
The recorded host plants for this species are bamboo, Arundinaria pygmaea glabra, Arundinaria simonii, Phyllostachys bambusoides and Oryza sativa.
