= Kasumi-ori Musume Hinagata =

Series of woodblock prints by Kitagawa Utamaro

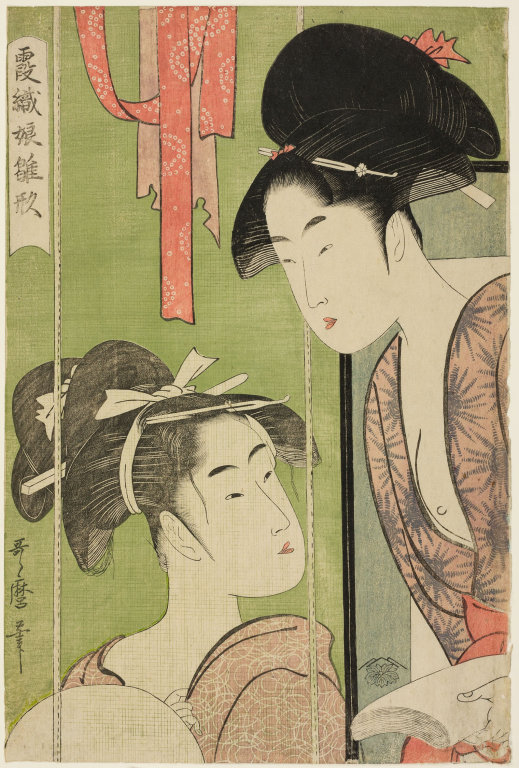
A woman peers from behind a mosquito net

Kasumi-ori Musume Hinagata (霞織娘雛形, "Model Young Women in Mist") is a print series by the Japanese ukiyo-e artist Kitagawa Utamaro. The theme is of beautiful women seen through different woven materials. Three prints from the series are known; whether there were more is unknown.

== Background ==
Ukiyo-e art flourished in Japan during the Edo period from the 17th to 19th centuries, and took as its primary subjects courtesans, kabuki actors, and others associated with the "floating world" lifestyle of the pleasure districts. Alongside paintings, mass-produced woodblock prints were a major form of the genre. In the mid-18th century full-colour nishiki-e prints became common, printed using a large number of woodblocks, one for each colour. A prominent genre was bijin-ga ("pictures of beauties"), which depicted most often courtesans and geisha at leisure, and promoted the entertainments of the pleasure districts.

Kitagawa Utamaro (c. 1753–1806) made his name in the 1790s with his bijin ōkubi-e ("large-headed pictures of beautiful women") portraits, focusing on the head and upper torso, a style others had previously employed in portraits of kabuki actors. Utamaro experimented with line, colour, and printing techniques to bring out subtle differences in the features, expressions, and backdrops of subjects from a wide variety of class and background. Utamaro's individuated beauties were in sharp contrast to the stereotyped, idealized images that had been the norm.

== Publication ==
The series was published in c. 1794–95 by Tsutaya Jūzaburō. It is not known how many were in the series; three are known, of which very few copies are known. The bear the seal Utamaro hitsu (歌麿筆, "the brush of Utamaro").

The prints are untitled, and variations of the titles that follow exist in both English and Japanese.

== Description and analysis ==
The series theme is of beautiful women seen through translucent woven materials. Two women appear in each print, one in front and one behind and seen through the translucent materials. Kasumi-ori (霞織, "mist-woven") is a neologism Utamaro uses to refer to materials woven so that they can be seen through unclearly, as in a mist. The translucent effect in the prints required the highest level of skill from their carvers and careful moderation of the baren burnishing tool by the printers.

=== Kachō ===
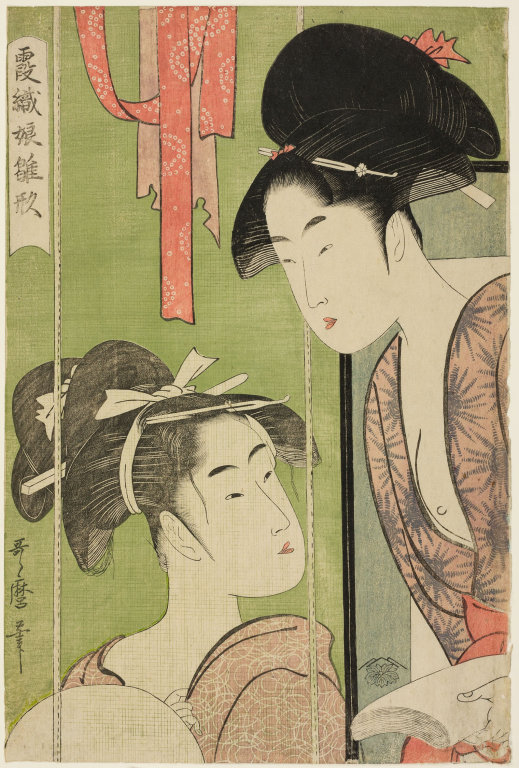

In Kachō (蚊帳, "Mosquito net", the same characters also pronounced kaya), a woman peers through a light yellowish-green (Note: Such nets came in light yellowish green or in white.) mosquito net of thin silk gauze, an item of great luxury at the time; commoners made such nets of hemp or cotton. The woman wears a in a narumi shibori tie-dyed komono patterned with scattered circles. From above hang two hoso-obi sashes, one red and the other violet. This is the only print in the series in which the woman face each other; they appear to be in conversation.

=== Sudare ===
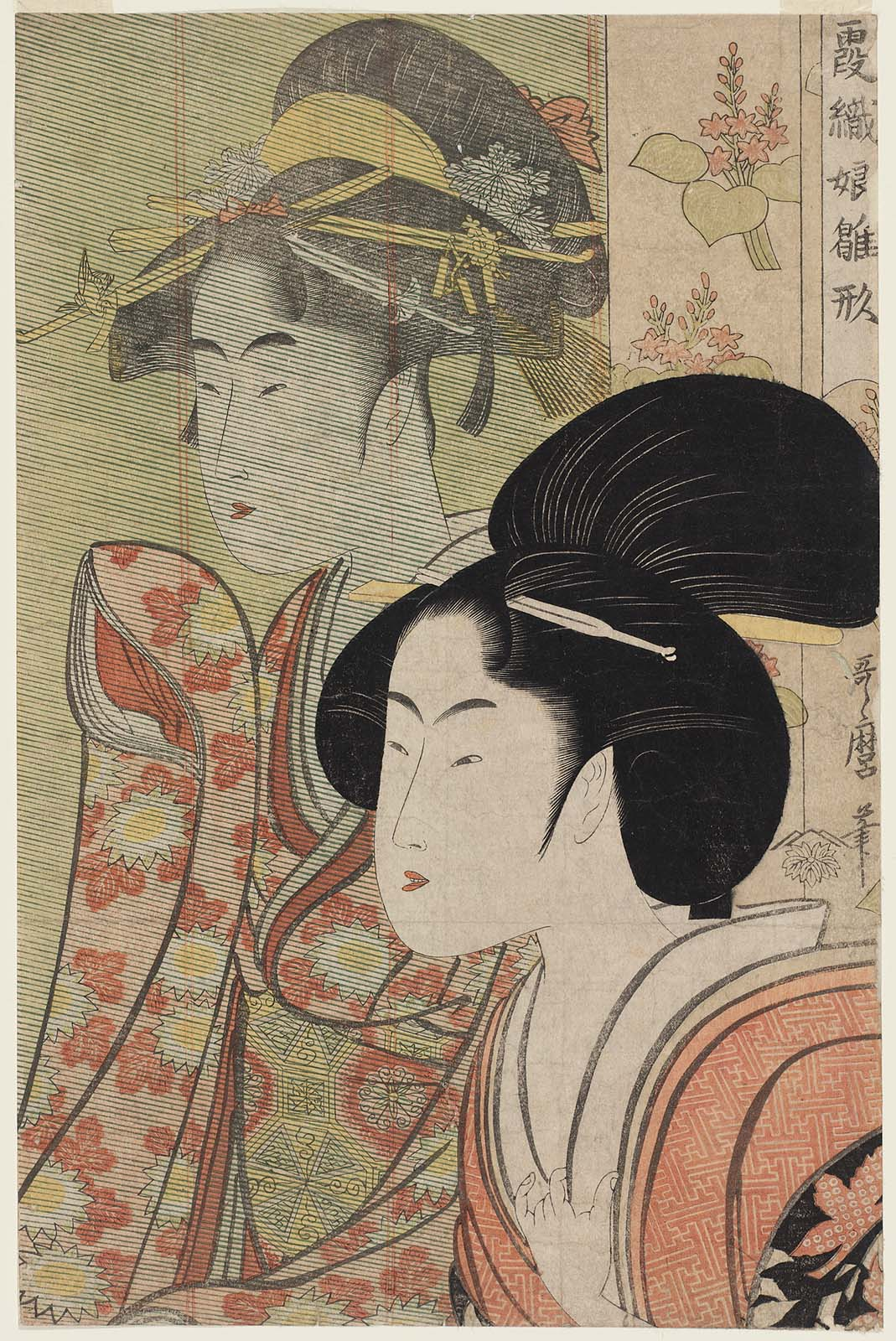

In Sudare (簾, "Reed screen"), woman dressed as a daughter of a high-ranking samurai family sits behind a luxurious sudare reed screen hemmed with a flower pattern. The woman who stands in front of the screen wears her hair in a shiitake-tabo, a hairstyle asocciated with the women-in-waiting at high-ranked samurai homes. Utamaro has posed the women so their hairstyles contrast—the woman behind the screen's is extravagantly tied and decorated, while the woman-in waiting's is much simpler. The both have pleased, attentive expressions, and appear to be watching something—perhaps a show or presentation.

The collectors William S. and John T. Spaulding bought a copy of this print from the architect Frank Lloyd Wright while in Japan in 1913. The Spaulding brothers donated their copy along with the rest of their collection to the Museum of Fine Arts, Boston on 21 December 1921.

=== Natsu Ishō ===
In Natsu Ishō (夏衣装, "Summer clothing"), an elegantly-dressed woman standing in the foreground holds a kanzashi hairpin with her right hand to her hair, which is made up in a baimage hairstyle. She appears to have just gotten out of the bath. Another young woman looks at her from behind a translucent cloth hung on a clothes rack. The pair appear to be in conversation.
