= Dickerson combination press =

Printing press invented mid 1950s

The Dickerson Combination Press is a printing press invented by Edward "Ted" Dickerson. It was made for intaglio printing, relief printing, and lithography. It could be used either electrically or hand driven. It earned patents in the United States (U.S. Patent No. 3067676) and Great Britain (British Patent No. 238,946).

== History ==
Dickerson earned his Master of Science in Art at the University of Wisconsin–Madison in the mid-1950s. While considering possible subjects for his master's thesis, he began thinking about the need for a better print-making press. He had a revelation about how to design a single press that would do the work of a plate intaglio, relief block, and stone lithographic press, and would do it better. Dickerson found a European craftsman to build him a prototype of the press in his garage.

After Dickerson worked on the press more, he eventually earned patents in the U.S. and Britain and began selling the printing presses to colleges and artists all over the world. From that point on, the Dickerson Combination Press was Dickerson's main source of income.

This press design is still in production in various sizes.

=== Intaglio printing ===
The user is able to adjust pressure easily and rapidly to the exact degree needed for any given plate. One would bring the upper roll down to the plate by turning a single adjustment screw. The roll automatically reaches a perfect parallel position with the plate (blanket) surface. Then two end adjustment screws would be turned down to meet the top of the roll's bearing blocks. If the user needed to add pressure on one end of the roll, he could simply turn the appropriate adjustment screw. The user is able to release or reapply pressure at any time (without changing pressure adjustment) by merely raising or lowering a lever. This eliminates problems such as starting or removing paper or felts that do not run out completely from between the rolls.

=== Relief printing ===
The flexibility of the Dickerson Press allows numerous approaches not possible with other machines. When using the top roller, the user can adjust it so that the thickest blocks will pass under it. It is not necessary to pad the relief from below because once brought down to the surface to be printed, the roller (or scraper bar in certain techniques) holds its position before, during, and after the print is made. Since the roller can be made to cant about 15 degrees, it will conform to uneven or warped surfaces. Sensitive pressure adjustment allows a range of printing from the richest blacks to the most velvety grays. Reliefs can be printed either face up or face down, to provide perfect color registry.

=== Lithography ===
For use as a stone lithography press, standard size wooden scraper bars replace the upper roller. The scraper, in its holder, is suspended from a central adjustment screw which allows it to conform to the surface of the stone. Metal plate lithographs may be printed with the scraper bar or the printing roll.
