= Ada Shrimpton =

English painter and printmaker (1856–1925)

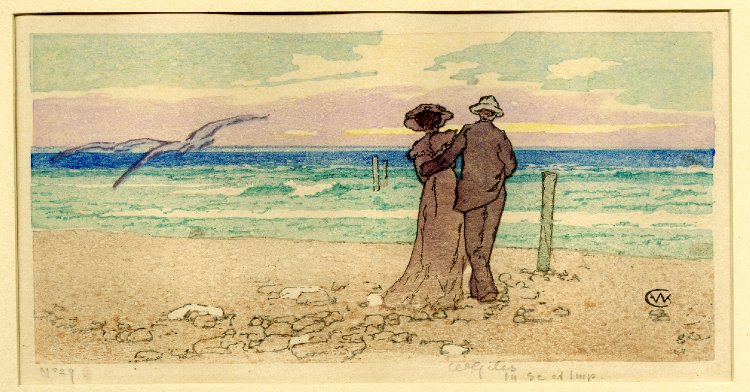
Ada depicted in a print made by her husband, William Giles, to commemorate their wedding

Ada Matilda Shrimpton (married name Giles, 1856–1925) was an English watercolour painter and printmaker.

== Early life ==
She was born at Old Alresford in 1856, daughter of George Shrimpton and Elizabeth Blake, and educated at Queen’s College, London. For a time she worked as a governess.

== Art and printmaking ==
In 1883, she moved to stay with a cousin in Reading, where she studied at the Reading School of Art and gave lectures on artistic anatomy in 1885. She later gained a scholarship to the National Art Training School in South Kensington and studied oil painting under Jean-Paul Laurens and Jean-Joseph Benjamin-Constant in Paris. From 1889 she exhibited at the Royal Academy, the Royal Institute of Water-Colours, the Society of Women Artists, the Paris Salon, and provincial galleries in England and Australia, showing flower paintings, genre scenes, and portraits.

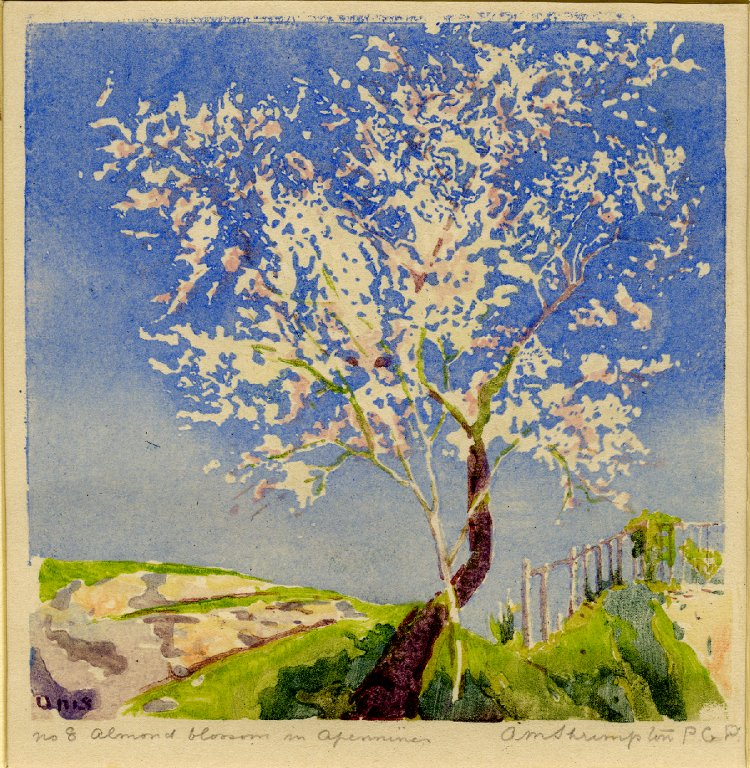
'Almond Blossom in the Apennines' by Ada Shrimpton (1911)

In 1907 she married printmaker William Giles, whom she had met at the Reading School of Art. Both keen travellers, they married in Venice, and he announced their wedding by producing a print of the couple standing on the seashore. She and her husband experimented with applying Japanese woodcut techniques to metal relief printing, a technique seen in Ada’s 1911 print 'Almond Blossoms in the Apennines'. She exhibited with the Society of Graver Printers, where she was a member of the council, from 1913 until the year of her death. Her help and financial backing led to the founding of The Original Colour Print Magazine in 1924.

== Death and legacy ==
Ada died in 1925. In her will she set up the 'A.M. Shrimpton and William Giles Bequest' to promote the art of colour printmaking. The British Museum used this fund to purchase pieces until 2005, when it was taken over by the Victoria and Albert Museum.
