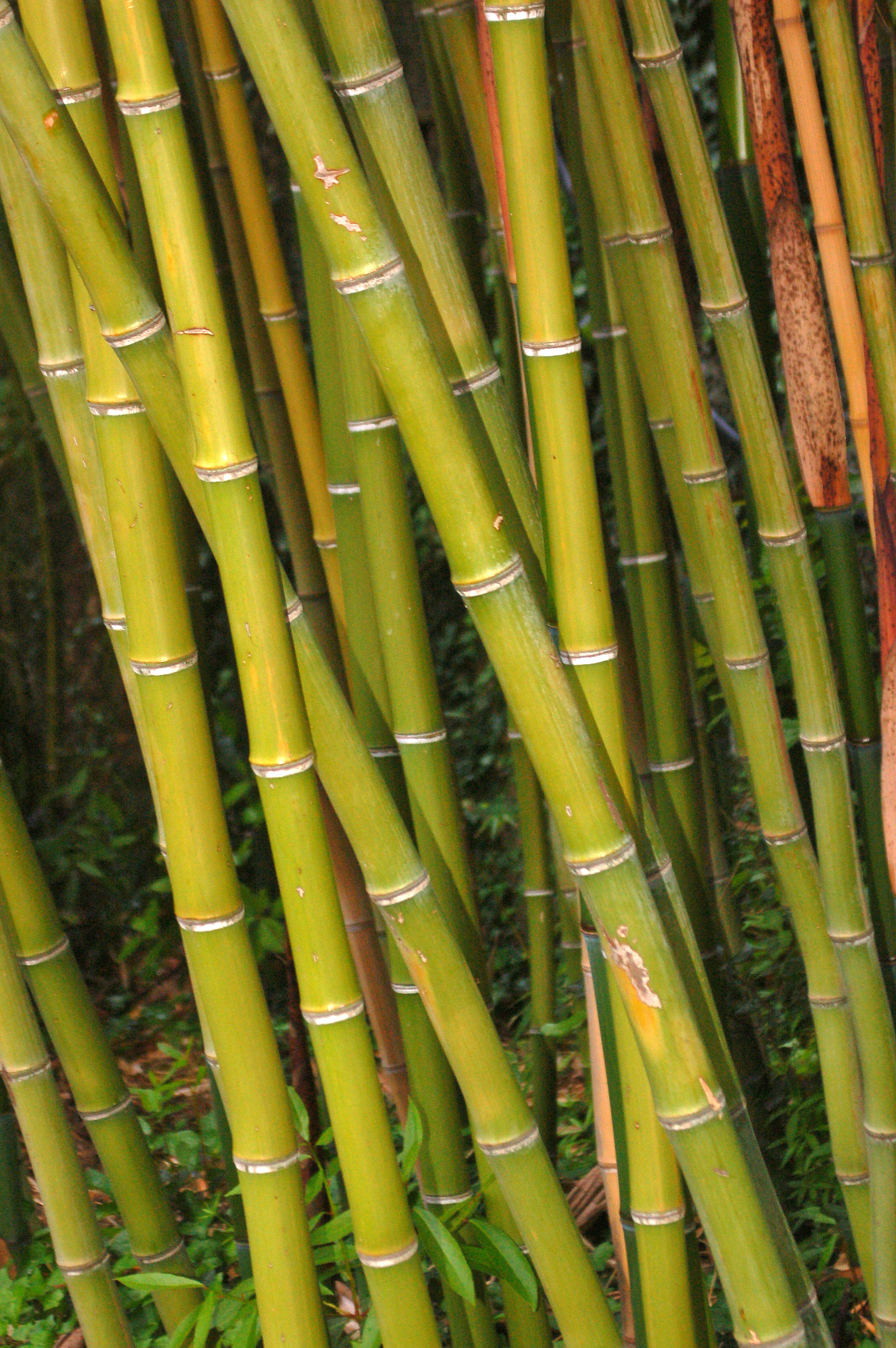
- Phyllostachys bambusoides at the botanical garden of Villa Durazzo-Pallavicini, Genova Pegli

Scientific classification
- Kingdom: Plantae
- Clade: Tracheophytes
- Clade: Angiosperms
- Clade: Monocots
- Clade: Commelinids
- Order: Poales
- Family: Poaceae
- Genus: Phyllostachys
- Species: P. bambusoides

Binomial name
- Phyllostachys bambusoides Siebold & Zucc.

Synonyms
- Phyllostachys quiloi; Phyllostachys reticulata non Rupr.; Phyllostachys sulphurea 'All Gold'.

= Phyllostachys bambusoides =

Species of plant

Phyllostachys bambusoides, commonly called madake, giant timber bamboo, or Japanese timber bamboo, is a species of flowering plant in the bamboo subfamily of the grass family Poaceae, native to China, and possibly also to Japan.

== Description ==
Phyllostachys bambusoides is a "running" (monopodial type) evergreen bamboo which can reach a height of roughly 20 m (66 ft) and a diameter of 10 cm (3.9 in). The culms are dark green, with a thin wall that thickens with maturity, and very straight, with long internodes and two distinctive rings at the node. The species is thin-skinned, easily split lengthwise, has long fibres, and is strong and highly flexible, even when split finely.

Leaves are dark green, and the sheaths are strong and hairless. New stalks emerge in late spring and grow at a rate of up to 1 m (3 ft 3 in) a day; one specimen produced culms growing a remarkable 120 cm (47 in) in 24 hours. The flowering interval of this species is very long, lasting roughly 120 years.

== Uses ==
In Asia, Phyllostachys bambusoides, known in Japan as madake, is one of the preferred bamboos for construction and furniture manufacture. Its properties also make it useful in a number of traditional Japanese arts and crafts:

- Both madake and Phyllostachys edulis (known in Japanese as moso) are used in the making of shakuhachi flutes
- The hairless and flexible sheaths of madake - known as takekawa or takenokawa - make it apt for wrapping food, and in the production of baren woodblock printing tools.
- The uniform, plain-colour sheaths of the variety kashirodake were traditionally used to weave the coverings of some geta, a covering known as tatami omote; however, in modern times, the variety used is a different and unknown species, grown in China and bleached to be plain in colour.
- The long internodes and equally long fibres of the bamboo make it ideal for traditional basket-weaving and the production of fans.

Historically, madake was used to create relatively durable carbon filaments in early incandescent light bulbs. The Edison Electric Light Company used madake from Yawata for about fifteen years.

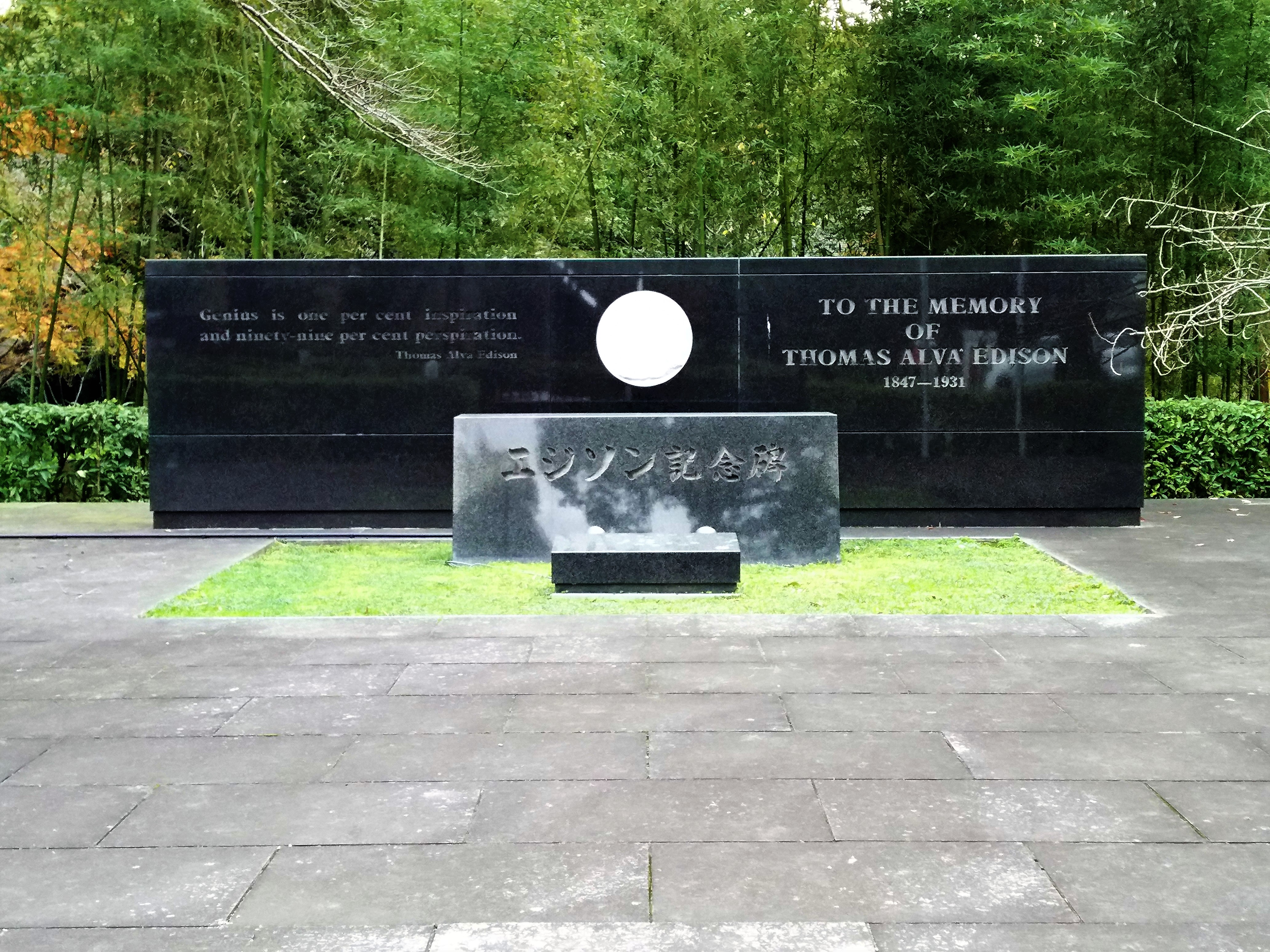
A monument to Thomas Edison at the Iwashimizu Hachimangū shrine near the madake groves in Yawata.

Phyllostachys bambusoides is cultivated as an ornamental plant in temperate zones worldwide, with numerous cultivars being available. Some grow to extreme lengths and heights, making them typically only suitable for parks and large gardens; however, more compact cultivars are available.

The following cultivars are recipients of the Royal Horticultural Society's Award of Garden Merit:

- 'Castillonii' – yellow canes, 4.5 m (15 ft)
- 'Holochrysa' – rich yellow canes, 8 m (26 ft)

== Gallery ==
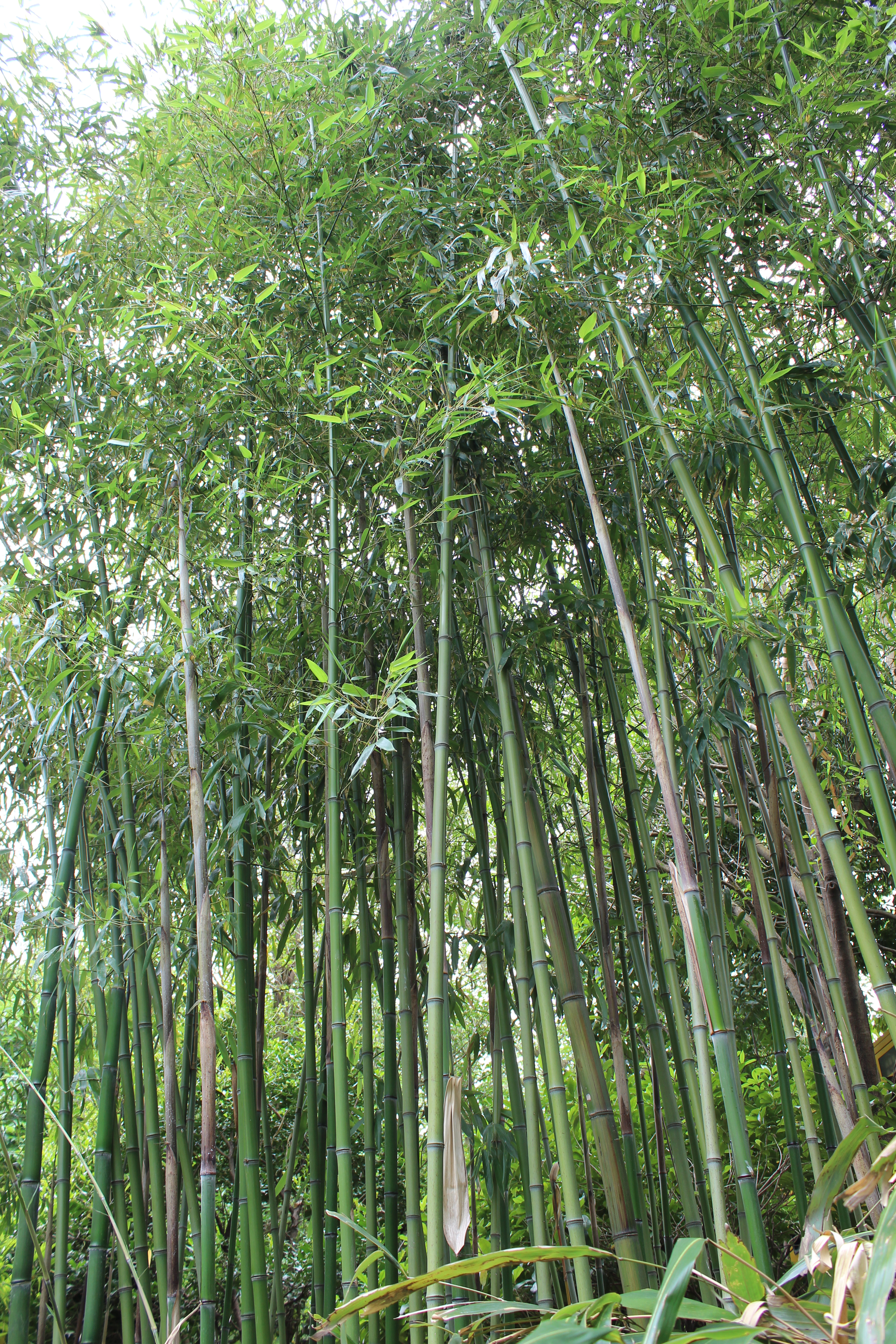
P. bambusoides 'Violascens'

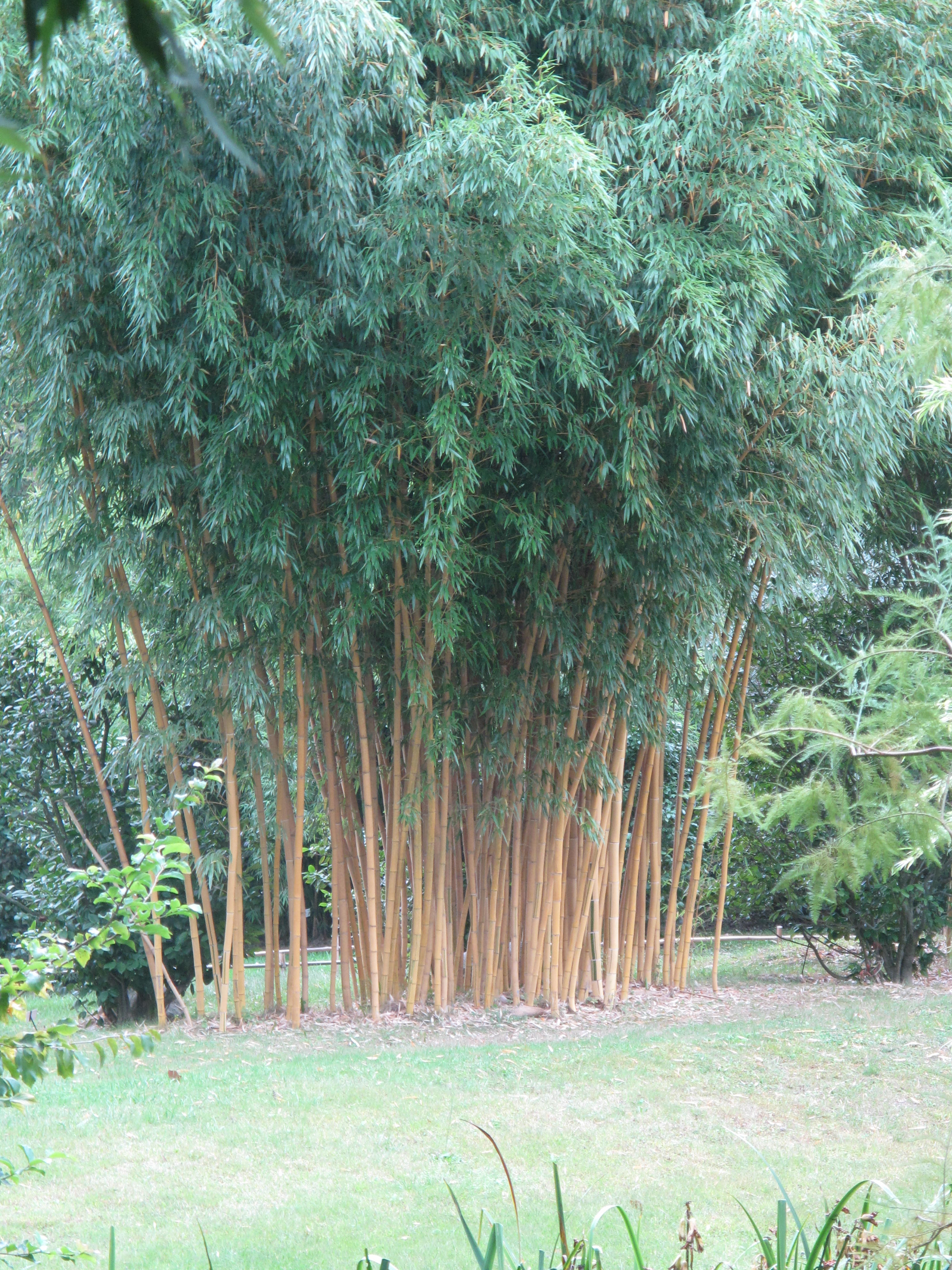
P. bambusoides 'Holochrysa'

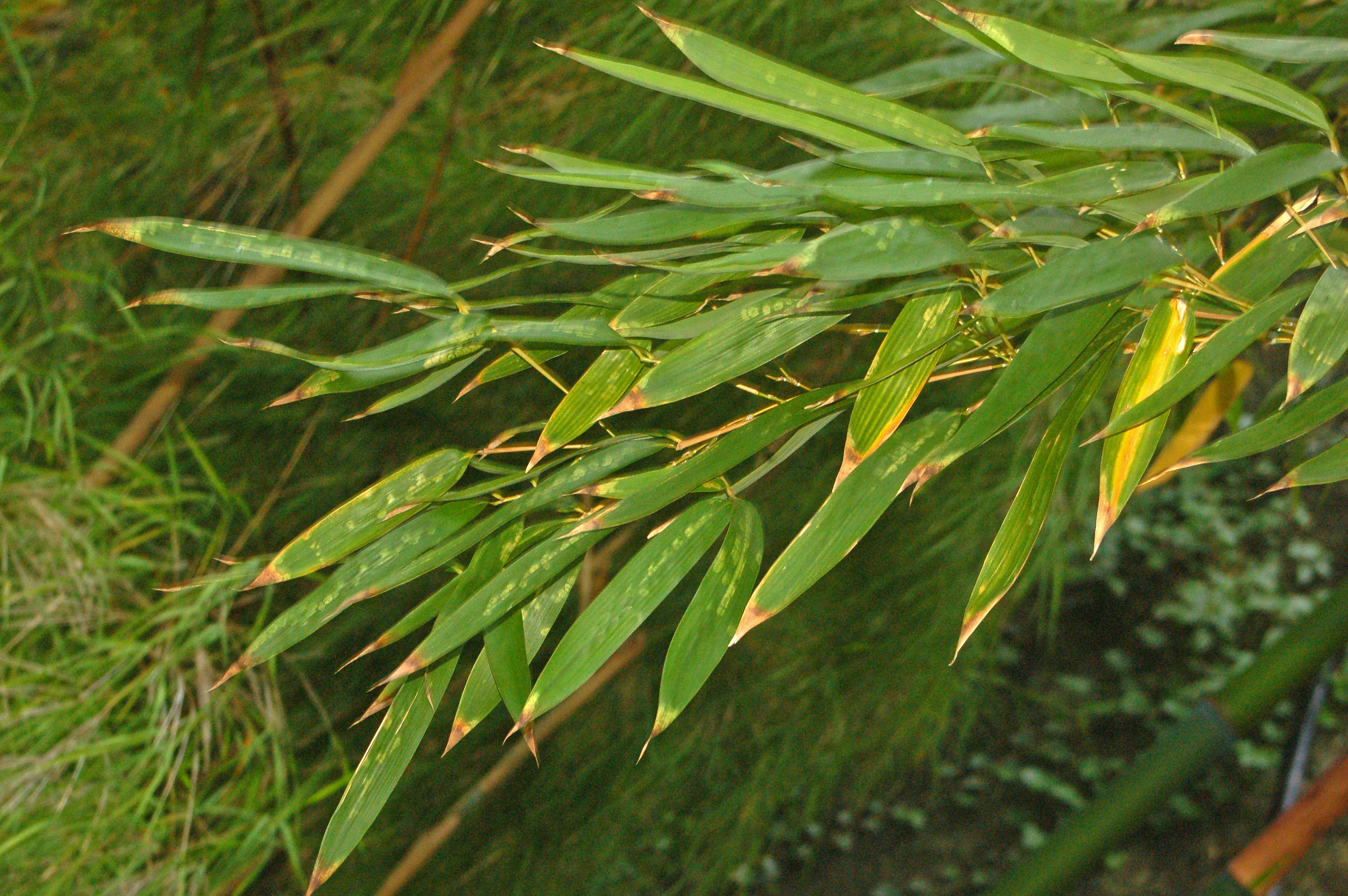
Branch of P. bambusoides

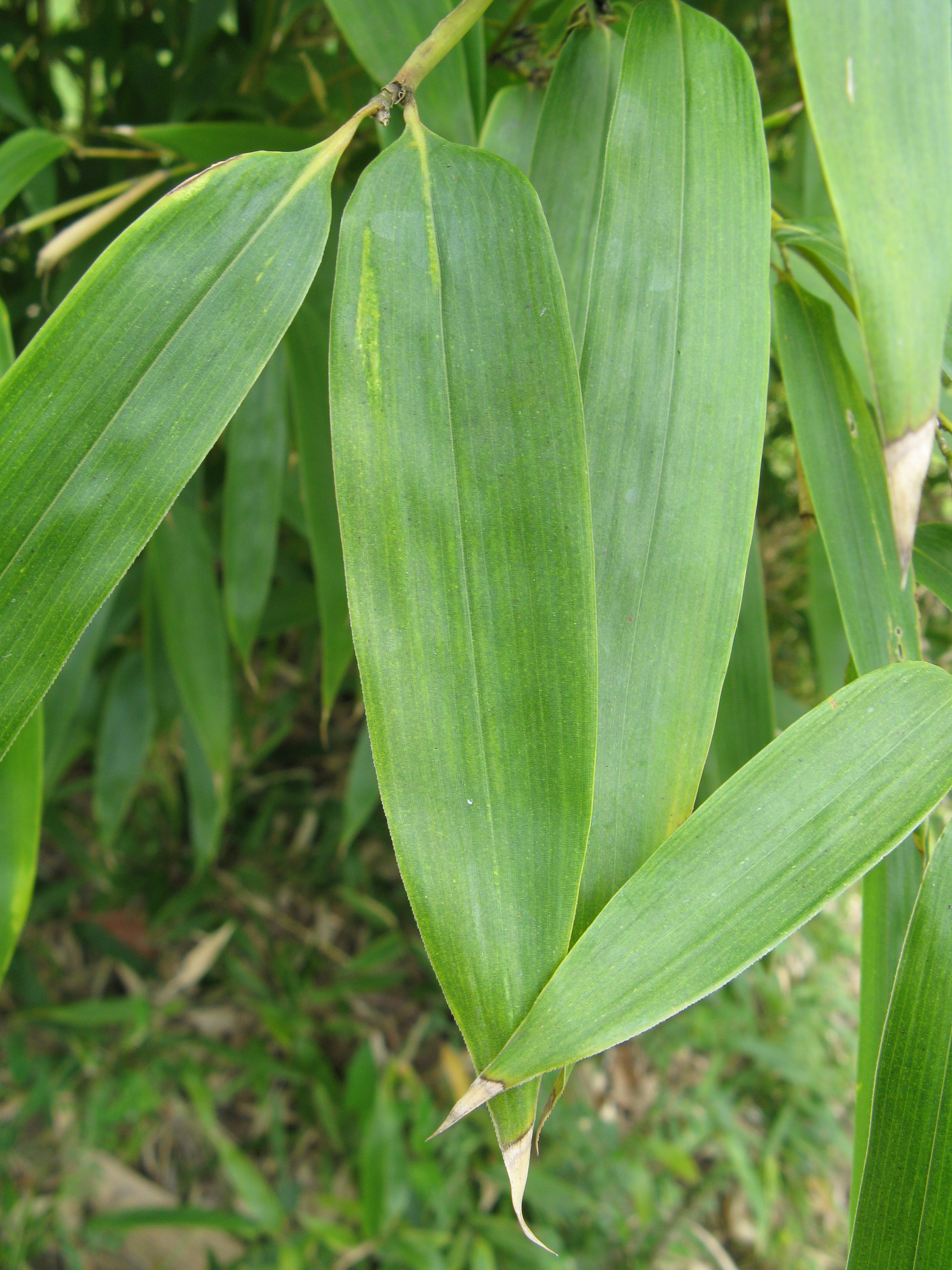
Leaf of 'P. bambusoides f castillonis
