= Baren (printing tool) =

Japanese burnishing tool

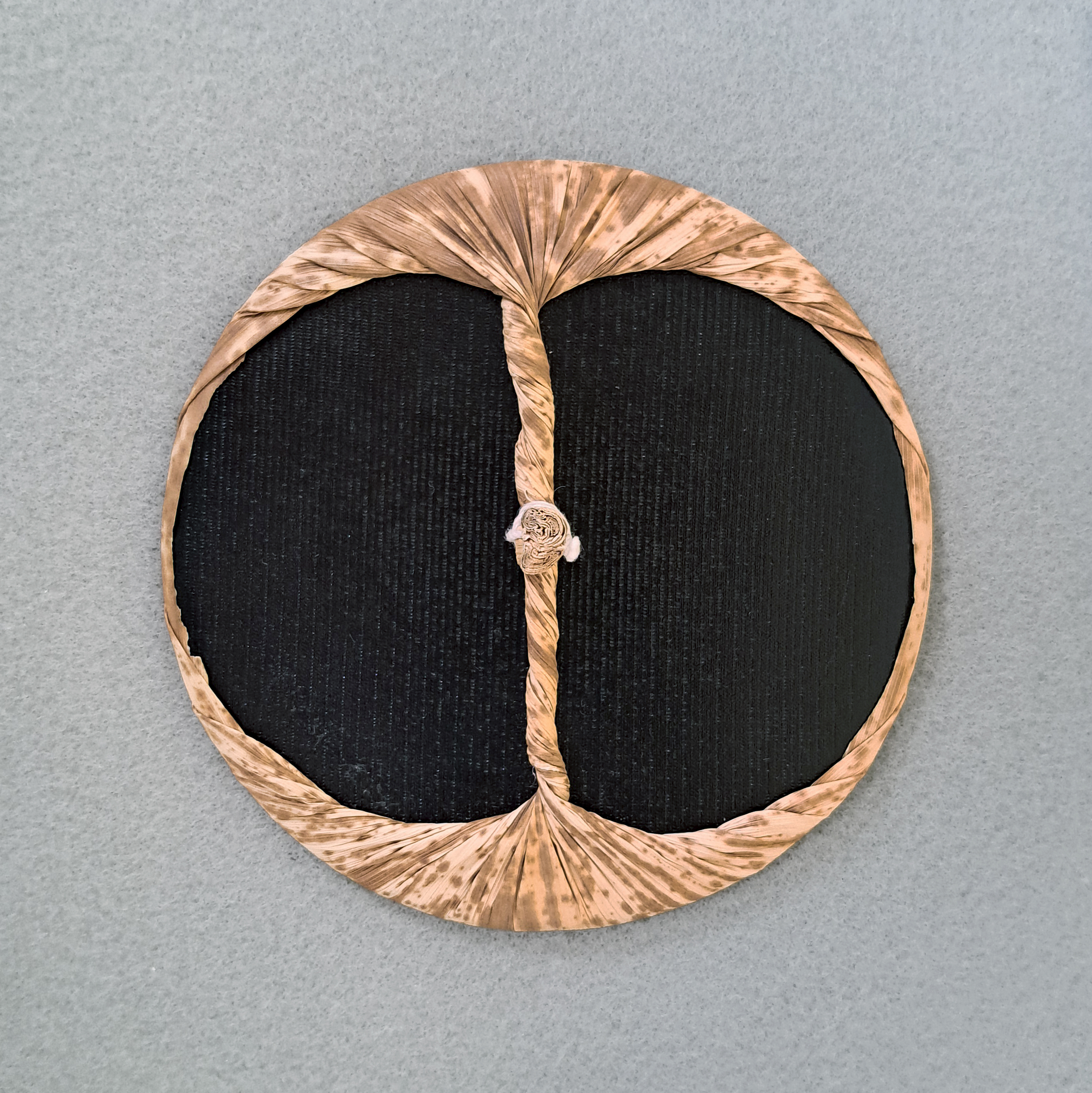
A baren

Baren (馬連、馬楝) is a disk-like hand tool with a flat bottom and a knotted handle used in Japanese woodblock printing. It is used to burnish (firmly rub) the back of a sheet of paper, lifting ink from the block.

== Construction ==
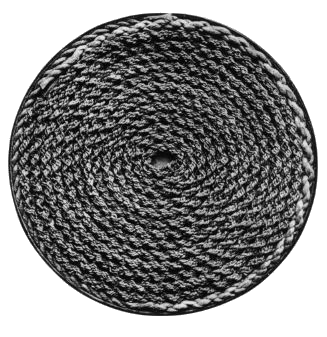
A coiled braided cord forms the core of the baren

Finishing the wrapping by pressing the baren down firmly with the left hand to tighten the wrapping and twisting the sheath with the right hand to form a handle.

A traditional (hon) baren is made of layers. A flat coil of braided cord forms the core. This is placed on a disk (ategawa) consisting of 30–40 sheets of high-grade long-fibred hosokawa paper, wrapped in tissue and black lacquer. This is covered by a thin bamboo sheath (takenokawa) twisted in such a manner as to form the handle on the top. According to Hiroshi Yoshida's manual Japanese Woodblock Printing (1939) the madake species of bamboo, grown in Kyushu, southwest Japan, is considered the best one to use.

The bamboo-sheath covering the baren may need to be renewed after a day's printing. Rewrapping requires great skill; a printer's ability is sometimes judged by their competence carrying out this work.

The disk inside the baren takes 40–50 days to create, as the craftsman glues one sheet of paper on the disk each day. The disk must then dry for a year before the baren is assembled. The coil and covering of the baren are woven and formed from parts of the bamboo plant, requiring the skill of a true master. Only one known person in Japan is still making traditional (hon) baren for a living — Hidehiko Goto of the Kikuhide workshop.

== Alternatives ==
Large wooden spoons are also used as burnishing tools in printmaking, glass jars with a smooth circular base can also be used for some applications. Low-cost plastic and nylon barens are available from Speedball Art.

Some newer barens are similar in shape to the traditional one with small metal ball bearings embedded in the bottom surface that generate the high point contact pressures (supplied by the braided cord) and have the low friction (offered by the bamboo leaf covering) of a traditional baren.

Another interesting baren is one developed by Professor Seishi Ozakus and made from a bundle of bamboo toothpicks.

Nik Semenoff has developed a palm press that serves as a baren replacement, made with a number of roller bearings alternating on two close spaced shafts in a small hand held mounting. The bearings have negligible friction and the pressures achievable are suitable for some offset lithography printing, though wider spacing of fewer contact points may make it less suited for traditional wood cut printing.
