= Planographic printing =

Printing from a flat surface, as opposed to a raised surface

Planographic printing means printing from a flat surface, as opposed to a raised surface (as with relief printing) or incised surface (as with intaglio printing). Lithography and offset lithography are planographic processes that rely on the property that water will not mix with oil. The image is created by applying a tusche (greasy substance) to a plate or stone. The term lithography comes from litho, for stone, and -graph to draw. Certain parts of the semi-absorbent surface being printed on can be made receptive to ink while others (the blank parts) reject it.

== See also ==
- Viscosity printing
- Flexography
