= Relief printing =

Family of printing methods

The basic concept of relief printing. A is the block or matrix; B is the paper; the thick black lines are the inked areas. (The thickness of the ink is greatly exaggerated for illustration.)

Relief printing is a family of printing methods where a printing block, plate or matrix, which has had ink applied to its non-recessed surface, is brought into contact with paper. The non-recessed surface will leave ink on the paper, whereas the recessed areas will not. A printing press may not be needed, as the back of the paper can be rubbed or pressed by hand with a simple tool such as a brayer or roller. In contrast, in intaglio printing, the recessed areas are printed.

Relief printing is one of the traditional families of printmaking techniques, along with the intaglio and planographic families, though modern developments have created others.

== Relief family of techniques ==
In the relief family of printing, the matrix was historically made subtractively, by removing material from the surface of areas not intended to be printed. The remaining surface would then receive ink. The relief family of techniques includes woodcut, metalcut, wood engraving, relief etching, linocut, rubber stamp, foam printing, potato printing, and some types of collagraph.

By contrast, in the intaglio family of printing, the recessed areas are printed by inking the whole matrix, then wiping the surface so that only ink in the recessed areas remains. Much greater pressure is then needed to force the paper into the channels containing the ink, so a high-pressure press is normally needed. Intaglio techniques include engraving, etching, and drypoint.

In the planographic family of printing, the entire surface of the matrix is flat, and some areas are treated to create the print image. Planographic techniques include lithography and offset lithography.

=== Mix relief and intaglio techniques ===
Normally, relief and intaglio techniques can only be mixed with others of the same family in the same printed page, unless the page is printed twice.

=== Movable type: traditional relief printing for text ===
Traditional text printing with movable type is also a relief technique. This meant that woodcuts were much easier to use as book illustrations, as they could be printed together with the text. Intaglio illustrations, such as engravings, had to be printed separately.

The first relief-printed publication in the US, the multi-page newspaper Publick Occurrences Both Forreign and Domestick, was published on September 25, 1690.

== See also ==
- List of art media
- List of art techniques
- Viscosity printing
