= Barbara Neustadt =

American printmaker and book artist

- Neustadt in her New York studio, 1956
- Born: 1922; Davenport, Iowa
- Died: 1998 (aged 75–76); Bradenton Beach, Florida
- Known for: book artist, printmaker

Barbara Neustadt (1922–1998) was an American printmaker and book artist. She is known for her lithograph prints.

== Biography ==
Neustadt was born in 1922 in Davenport, Iowa. She studied at Smith College. She worked at Atelier 17 when it was located in New York City. In New York she also with fellow printmakers Robert Blackburn, Margaret Lowengrund, and Michael Ponce de Leon. In 1967, she established the Studio Graphics Workshop in Woodstock, New York and in 1980 she established the Pleiades Press. In 1986, she created the artist's book A Dream of Love with the poet Joseph Langland. She died in 1998 in Bradenton Beach, Florida.

Neustadt's work is in the National Gallery of Art, the National Museum of Women in the Arts, the Syracuse University Art Museum, and the Walker Art Center.
