= Ruth Kerkovius =

German American artist

- Born: 1921; Berlin, Germany
- Died: 2007 (aged 85–86)
- Known for: Printmaking
- Spouse: Jay L. Johnson

Ruth Kerkovius (9 June 1921 – 23 January 2007) was a German-born artist known for her printmaking, painting, and textile design.

== Biography ==
Kerkovius was born in 1921 in Berlin, Germany. She spent her youth in Riga, Latvia, relocating to Munich, Germany to study at the Ludwig-Maximilians-Universität München.

In the late 1940s she moved to New York. She studied at the Art Students League of New York and the Pratt Graphic Art Center where she was taught by Antonio Frasconi and Michael Ponce de Leon.

She participated in annual print competitions at the Boston Printmakers, the Library of Congress, the Museum of Fine Arts, Boston, the Pennsylvania Academy of the Fine Arts, and the Society of American Graphic Artists.

Her work is in the collections of the Cincinnati Art Museum, the Library of Congress, The National Gallery of Art, the University of Chicago, and Wesleyan University.

Kerkovius died in 2007.
