= Ansei Uchima =

American artist (1921–2000)

- Born: May 1, 1921; Stockton, California, U.S.
- Died: May 9, 2000 (aged 79); New York, New York, U.S.
- Education: Waseda University, Tokyo
- Known for: woodblock printmaking
- Style: modern
- Spouse: Toshiko Uchima

Ansei Uchima (Japanese 内間安瑆) (May 1, 1921 - May 9, 2000) was an American artist and teacher primarily known as a sōsaku-hanga (creative print) woodblock printmaker who employed traditional ukiyo-e Japanese techniques to produce abstract works covering a range of distinct personal styles.

== Early life and education ==
Uchima was born in Stockton, California on May 1, 1921, the eldest of four sons, to Japanese immigrant parents Anchin and Haru, and was raised in Los Angeles. Upon graduating from Manual Arts High School in 1940, Uchima left the United States to study in Japan, enrolling the following year at Waseda University in Tokyo, where he studied architecture. Caught in Japan during the Second World War, Uchima discontinued his architectural studies and remained in Tokyo for 19 years, pursuing an artistic career based on painting and printmaking.

== Career ==
Uchima's career as a woodblock printmaker began in Tokyo in the mid-1950s, when the sōsaku-hanga movement was gaining popularity. Americans living in Japan, such as authors James Michener and Oliver Statler, became collectors of sōsaku-hanga and sought to make them known abroad.

Uchima served as a bridge between these Americans, on the one hand, and the Japanese artists, on the other, drawing upon his bi-cultural background, bilingual ability and artistic experience, assisting Statler, as interpreter, with dozens of interviews Statler conducted with these artists. Those interviews culminated in Statler's 1956 book Modern Japanese Prints: An Art Reborn, which introduced sōsaku-hanga to the United States, where they earned critical acclaim and popularity. Inspired and influenced by the sōsaku-hanga masters with whom he had become personally acquainted, in particular Kōshirō Onchi and Shikō Munakata, Uchima produced a large number of prints in Tokyo between 1955 and 1959, which he exhibited in shows in Tokyo, as well as the São Paulo International Biennale and the Grenchen International Print Triennial. He formed part of the younger generation of artists comprising "the central core of the contemporary print world" in Japan that included Hideo Hagiwara, Fumio Kitaoka, Jun'ichirō Sekino, Hodaka Yoshida and Masaji Yoshida.

In November 1959, Uchima left Japan with his family and returned to the United States, settling in New York City the following year. By that time, in Michener's words, Uchima was "a master craftsman" who was "producing some of the finest prints being made today." Uchima's friend, sculptor Isamu Noguchi, wrote that Uchima was recognized in Japan "as one of the leaders in the renaissance of the woodcut." Uchima helped to organize "Modern Japanese Prints – Sōsaku Hanga," a comprehensive exhibition of sōsaku-hanga from its origins in the early twentieth century to the present, the first of its kind, at the Art Institute of Chicago in 1960.

As he had done in Japan, Uchima served as a bridge between the American and Japanese printmaking worlds, bringing Japanese technique and sensibilities to his work in New York, where he became a member of the Society of American Graphic Artists and the International Graphic Arts Society, which commissioned editions of nine prints by Uchima. He also served as a resource to Japanese artists in the United States and was one of the few instructors of Japanese woodblock printing techniques in the country. He taught first at Pratt Graphic Art Center in 1961 and 1962, and then full-time at Sarah Lawrence College from 1962 to 1982 and part-time at Columbia University from 1968 until 1982. Uchima was awarded two John H. Simon Guggenheim Fellowships, one in 1962 and the other in 1970.

Uchima's style evolved from works influenced by Abstract Expressionism until the mid-1960s, to minimalist compositions using geometric shapes from the late-1960s to the mid-1970s and, from 1977, to pastel hued works with "a 'tapestried' color surface" and parallel vertical lines forming the "panels" of a traditional Japanese folding screen, or byōbu, the complexities of which required great technical skill and labor, with up to 45 printings per sheet. In addition to woodcut prints, he produced etchings, oil and watercolor paintings and drawings in pastel, charcoal and pencil.

In December 1982, Uchima suffered a stroke which cut his career short. His works from 1955 to 1982 have continued to be exhibited in the United States and Japan. Sarah Lawrence College appointed him to its emeritus faculty in 1988 and the Japan Print Association named him an emeritus member in 1995. Uchima died in New York on May 9, 2000. There have been two major retrospective shows of Uchima's work, the first in 1985 at Sarah Lawrence College and the second, in 2014, in Okinawa, Japan, the birthplace of his parents, at the Okinawa Prefectural Museum & Art Museum (Ansei Uchima: Symphony of Colors and Wind), which displayed more than 100 of Uchima's works from throughout his career.

== Personal life ==
In 1955, Uchima married Japanese artist Toshiko Aohara, who was one of the first women members of the Democratic Artists Association (Demokrāto) and a co-founder of the Joryū Hanga Kyōkai (Women's Print Association) in Japan in 1955 and, later, in New York, a noted collage and box assemblage artist. The Uchimas' works have been exhibited together in a number of two-person shows at the Striped House Museum of Art and the Toki-no-Wasuremono Gallery in Tokyo. Their son, born in 1958, is an attorney in New York.

== Teaching ==
Sarah Lawrence College faculty (1962–82) and emeritus faculty (1988); Columbia University lecturer and adjunct faculty (1968–82); Sarah Lawrence College Summer Art Program, Lacoste, France (now Lacoste School of Arts), instructor (1971–75); Pratt Graphic Art Center, guest instructor (1961, 1962); Art Institute of Chicago, special lecturer (1960).

== Collections ==
Uchima's work is represented in the permanent collections of approximately 100 museums and major institutions, including:

- Metropolitan Museum of Art
- Museum of Modern Art
- Whitney Museum of American Art
- Art Institute of Chicago
- National Gallery of Art
- Smithsonian American Art Museum
- Smithsonian National Museum of Asian Art
- Philadelphia Museum of Art
- Fine Arts Museums of San Francisco
- Los Angeles County Museum of Art
- British Museum
- Rijksmuseum
- National Museum of Modern Art, Tokyo

== Exhibitions ==
=== Selected Solo Exhibitions ===
More than 50 solo exhibitions in the United States and Japan, including:

- Yoseido Gallery, Tokyo, 1955, 1961, 1967, 1976, 1981
- Associated American Artists Gallery, New York, 1988, 1997
- Pratt Graphic Art Center, New York, 1970
- Susan Teller Gallery, New York, 2004
- Toki-no-Wasuremono Gallery, Tokyo, 2000, 2005
- The Japan Society, New York, 1962, 1963
- Honolulu Museum of Art, "Ansei Uchima: Non-Objective Abstraction in Modern Japanese Prints," 2016
- Sarah Lawrence College Gallery, "Ansei Uchima: A Retrospective," 1985
- Okinawa Prefectural Museum & Art Museum, Japan, "Ansei Uchima: Symphony of Colors and Wind," 2014
- Sarah Lawrence College Gallery, "Ansei Uchima: Selections," 2025

Two-person and three-person shows included those with Masayuki Nagare at Yoseido Gallery, 1957; with Toshiko Uchima at Striped House Museum of Art, Tokyo, 1986, 1989, 1994, 1999, 2012 and Toki-no-Wasuremono Gallery, Tokyo, 2018; and with Toshiko Uchima and Isamu Noguchi at Hunterdon Art Center, New Jersey, 1980.

=== Selected group exhibitions ===
- 35th Venice International Biennale, 1970
- Fifth São Paulo International Biennial, 1959
- First and Second Tokyo International Biennial of Prints, 1957, 1960
- Grenchen International Print Triennale, 1958, 1961, 1970
- Whitney Museum of American Art, Annual Exhibition of Sculpture and Prints, 1966; "Selections from the Collection: Prints from 1950 Through the Early 1960's," 1995-96
- Art Institute of Chicago, "Japan's Modern Prints: Sosaku Hanga," 1960
- Carnegie Museum of Art, "Eight Hundred Years of Japanese Printmaking," 1976–77; "Imprinting in Their Time: Japanese Printmakers, 1912-2022," 2023-24
- Worcester Art Museum, "A Spectrum of Innovation: Color in American Printmaking 1890-1960," 1990
- Zimmerli Museum of Art, "American Traditions/Modern Expressions: Asian American Artists and Abstraction 1945-1970," 1997 (traveling); "Blocks of Color: American Woodcuts from the 1890's to the Present," 2009
- National Museum of Modern Art, Tokyo, "Masterpieces of Modern Japanese Art, 1997"; "Modern Japanese Art from the Museum Collection," 2010
- Society of American Graphic Artists, Annual Print Exhibition, 1960, 1962, 1965
- Print Council of America, "American Prints Today," 1962
- Des Moines Art Center, "East and Beyond: Helen Frankenthaler and Her Contemporaries," 2015
- Michener Art Museum, "Mid-Century to Manga: The Modern Japanese Print in America," 2023.
- Print Center New York, "A Model Workshop: Margaret Lowengrund and The Contemporaries," 2023.
- Scholten Japanese Art, "Creative Connections: Sosaku-Hanga Artists & New York," 2024-25.
- Honolulu Museum of Art, "Beyond Onchi: Works by Creative Print (Sosaku Hanga) Artists," 2025.
- The Museum of Modern Art, Hayama, Traveling Exhibition "Ansei and Toshiko Uchima: Weaving Colors and Memories," 2026.

== Selected publications ==
- Acton, David. A Spectrum of Innovation: Color in American Printmaking 1890-1960. (New York: W. W. Norton & Co., 1990)
- Eichenberg, Fritz. The Art of the Print. (New York: Harry N. Abrams, Inc., 1976)
- Hanga Geijutsu, "100 Masterpieces of Contemporary Printmaking." No. 200, Summer 2023 (commemorative 200th issue)
- Heller, Jules. Printmaking Today. (New York: Holt, Rinehart and Winston, Inc., 2nd ed.,1972)
- Johnson, Una E. American Prints and Printmakers. (New York: Doubleday & Co., Inc., 1980)
- Kawakita, Michiaki. Contemporary Japanese Prints. (Tokyo: Kodansha International, 1967)
- Kuwahara, Noriko. Postwar Printmaking Exchanges between Japan and the United States: 1945-1965. (Tokyo: Serika Shobo, 2024)
- Michener, James A. Japanese Prints: From the Early Masters to the Modern (Tokyo: Charles E. Tuttle Co., 1959)
- Nagatsu, Teizo. "The Art of Ansei Uchima: A Study of His Pictorial Space." Bulletin of the University of the Ryukyus, No. 90, Feb. 2017
- Okazaki, Kenjiro. The Analysis of Modern Art: Abstract Art as Impact. (Tokyo: Aki Shobo, 2018)
- Okinawa Prefectural Museum & Art Museum. Ansei Uchima: Symphony of Colors and Wind. Exhibition Catalogue. (Tokyo: Bunshin Printing Co., Ltd., 2015)
- Rosenblum, Lauren and Weyl, Christina. A Model Workshop: Margaret Lowengrund and The Contemporaries. Print Center New York exhibition publication. (Munich: Hirmer Publishers, 2023)
- Sarah Lawrence College. Ansei Uchima: A Retrospective. Exhibition Catalogue. (Tappan, New York: Shepherd Press, 1985)
- The Museum of Modern Art, Hayama; Hekinan City Fujii Tatsukichi Museum of Contemporary Art; The Museum of Modern Art, Saitama. "Ansei and Toshiko Uchima: Weaving Colors and Memories". Exhibition Catalogue. (Tokyo: The Tokyo Shimbun, 2026)
- Uchima, Ansei. "My 30 Years Adventure with Woodcut Printing." Hanga Geijutsu, no. 38, summer 1982
- Wechsler, Jeffrey, ed. Asian Traditions/Modern Expressions: Asian American Artists and Abstraction 1945-1970. (New York: Harry N. Abrams, Inc., 1997)
