= Martin Barooshian =

American painter and printmaker

- Born: December 18, 1929; Chelsea
- Died: January 25, 2022 (aged 92); North Reading
- Occupation: Painter, printmaker
- Website: martinbarooshian.org

Martin Barooshian (December 18, 1929- January 25, 2022) was an American painter and printmaker. He is known for his ability to weave a tapestry of art historical influences with modernist elements and a contemporary sensibility. His work frequently dances the line of Surrealism and Expressionism, often with a pop and op art edge, incorporating aspects of primitive, Romantic, and Renaissance art. He has worked in a wide variety of media from miniature etchings to oversized oils on canvas. These have included woodcuts, lithographs, etchings and engravings with aquatint and soft ground, monotypes, gouache and watercolor paintings, and oils. He is also known for his technical skill and innovation.

Martin Barooshian. Love Scene from Faust, 1956. Engraving, aquatint, and soft ground. 12 x 15 3/8 in.

Barooshian is a restless innovator with work that has moved through many periods with varying styles and transitions. However, Barooshian defines himself as a Biomorphic Abstract Surrealist after his first personal artistic breakthrough and mature style. Cate McQuaid—art critic for The Boston Globe—dubbed Barooshian's biomorphic surrealist style as “Pablo Picasso meets Stan Lee,” recognizing the blend of the modern with the contemporary. Further, she recognized that Barooshian held firm to his own artistic vision and was “not a follower of fashions” but instead “has always defined his own style…against the grain of the art scene.”

Barooshian has enjoyed a 70-year career as an artist and continues to actively create new works. Susan Faxon, associate director and Curator of the Addison Gallery of American Art, summed up her experience of reviewing Barooshian's oeuvre: “It was clear that [Barooshian] had devoted a lifetime to the making of art and that he was still fully engaged on a daily basis in the creative process. So too it was clear that here was an artist whose sweep was wide, whose influences and interests were many, whose output was prodigious, and whose exuberance, inventiveness, imagination, and artistic commitment was boundless.“ Patrick Murphy, Lia and William Poorvu Associate Curator of Prints and Drawings at the Museum Of Fine Arts, Boston, called Barooshian “a consummate printmaker, whose intriguing and oddly overlooked body of work deserves to be celebrated alongside that of mid-century contemporaries like Hayter, Helen Phillips, Fred Becker, and Gabor Peterdi.”

A catalogue raisonne of Barooshian's prints from 1948 to 1970 has been completed.

== Exhibitions, collections, and awards ==
Barooshian has participated in hundreds of shows around the world, including over 50 one-man shows. His work is in the permanent collection of many important museums around the globe including the Metropolitan Museum of Art, the Museum of Modern Art, the Museum of Fine Arts, Boston, the National Gallery of Art, and the Addison Gallery of American Art. In 2022, the Museum of Fine Arts, Boston added 35 Barooshian works to its collection. He has won several awards including the Albert H. Whitin Traveling Fellowship, the Print Prize from the National Academy of Design, and the Dorothy Lathrop Award from the Print Club of Albany.

== Background ==
Barooshian was born in Chelsea, Massachusetts as the first of three children to Armenian immigrant parents, survivors of the Armenian genocide. Barooshian studied at the School of the Museum of Fine Arts, Boston (SMFA) with Karl Zerbe, Ture Bengtz, and Richard C. Bartlett. He studied lithography in Paris with Gaston Dorfinant and Jean Pons. Perhaps the greatest influence on Barooshian's development was the time he spent in the early-1950s with Stanley William Hayter at his famed etching and engraving studio Atelier 17 in Paris. In addition to the fourth and fifth year diplomas earned at SFMA, Barooshian also earned a Bachelor of Science in Education degree from Tufts University and a Master of Arts in Art History degree from Boston University. Barooshian served in the United States Army, though he was never deployed.

My Asia Minor, 1965. Color viscosity intaglio with aquatint and soft ground. 24 x 18 3/4 in.

Barooshian enjoyed very early success following his “discovery” by famed American etcher John Taylor Arms. This exposure directly led directly to the Library of Congress acquiring a complete portfolio of his woodcuts when Barooshian was only aged 22. Childs Gallery in Boston held Barooshian's first one-man show in 1951.

Barooshian was introduced by his then girlfriend Reba Stewart to the art community of Provincetown, MA where Barooshian found creative kinship throughout the 1950s. Barooshian is represented in Provincetown by The Julie Heller Gallery.

== Atelier 17 and color viscosity etching ==
While at Atelier 17, Barooshian was taught the color viscosity etching techniques developed by Hayter and his colleagues. Previous to this time in Paris, Barooshian's graphics output was largely woodcuts and lithographs. However, with intaglio etching, he found the graphics medium that best allowed him to express his personal vision and that would dominate his printmaking for decades.

Barooshian continued to adapt the concepts of color viscosity etching to his own needs, becoming one of its most important masters. Of these works, critic Malcolm Preston wrote, “Barooshian’s prints enjoy a uniqueness. His heavily etched surfaces, which produce bold relief and strong textural areas, along with an interesting use of color, are contemporary elements that when joined to the past mark Martin Barooshian as a distinctly individual graphic artist.” In 1970, the Montreal Museum of Fine Arts mounted a major exhibition of 45 of Barooshian's color viscosity etchings, purchasing three for their permanent collection.

== Professional commitment ==
Barooshian served as president of the Society of American Graphic Artists and the vice president of the U.S. Committee of the International Association of Art for the United Nations Educational, Scientific, and Cultural Organization (UNESCO).

Beginning in 1960 and for over a decade, Barooshian was the supervisor of the Graphics Workshop for Professionals at the Pratt Institute Graphic Art Center in Manhattan. During this period, the Pratt Workshop was a pioneering place of learning and innovation. While at Pratt, Barooshian had the opportunity to work with many of the major Abstract Expressionists of the period, teaching lithography to Barnett Newman.
