= Ralph Fabri =

American painter

- Born: April 23, 1894; Budapest, Austria-Hungary
- Died: February 12, 1975 (aged 80); New York, New York, United States
- Occupation: Painter

Ralph Fabri (April 23, 1894 – February 12, 1975) was an American painter. His work was part of the painting event in the art competition at the 1936 Summer Olympics.

== Biography ==
Ralph Fabri (originally Febri Reszo) was born in Hungary on April 23, 1894. He did not go by Ralph Fabri until he immigrated New York City in 1921. He became an American citizen in 1927. From 1945 to the 1970s, he wrote over 10 art manuals and how-to-paint books. He was skilled in lithograph, painting, sculpting, etching, ink, and printmaking. After a long career as an artist, writer, and educator he died at the age of 80 on February 12, 1975 at his home in Manhattan.

== Education ==
In 1918, Fabri received his M.A. in education and the arts from the Royal Academy of Fine Arts in Budapest. Initially his studies were in architecture while he was enrolled with the Royal Institute of Technology (1912-1914). He graduated in 1918 with an M.A. for certification as a Professor from the Royal Academy of Fine Arts. He enrolled at the National Academy of Design in 1923, and after he became an American citizen, he saved up enough money to focus on his art career.

As an educator himself, he worked in schools such as Parsons School of Design, the Newark School of Fine and Industrial Art, and the National Academy School of Fine Arts(in order) where he participated in 1918 as a student. He finally worked as a professor until 1965 teaching art history at the NY City College.

== Career ==
Before his contributions to graphic works, he had an interest in architecture as his original career path. He was referred to as "the porch builder" by Theodore Dreiser. He was also referenced as building the "natural stone porch" for Dreiser's house in Mount Kisco, New York, and he also contributed various design work to other structures of the property. In other accounts it is stated that Fabri painted the tepee of Dreiser with a clash of colors that depicted different weather elements and occurrences such as lightning, rain, rainbows, but also clouds and the sun. Fabri was often referenced as a friend of Dreiser due to the many commissions provided to Fabri; yet after his acquaintance died, Fabri commented on Dreiser's controversial character, referring to the exploitation and selfishness he was known for. Despite this, Fabri also found it important to note Dreiser's magnetism and intelligence when speaking with the W.A. Swanberg Papers in 1965.

Fabri did commercial design work during his enrollment at the National Academy of Design. Until the early 1930s he was able to focus on his career as an artist to which he returned to commercial design and also opened "Ralph Fabri Studios" which closed shortly after.

People like Margit Varga exhibited his work in the early 1930s. His work was housed by "Painters and Sculptors Gallery" in Greenwich Village. As to which pieces of Fabri's were held it is not stated however his work was part of Varga's effort to sell small affordable art for smaller New York apartments. His work was sold alongside other artists such as: Alexander Brooks, Margit de Cornini, E. E. Cummings, Eugene Fitsch, Philip Reisman, Harry Sternberg, and Richard Lahey.

The Stamp & Album Co. was his largest patron, whom he supplied with his ink drawings. He wrote art reviews and articles for Hungarian newspapers after his arrival in the United States and even submitted his work to local papers. He taught at the Parsons School of Design as teacher of life drawing from 1947 to 1949 and eventually taught painting from 1951 until 1967 when he decided to retire.

== Notable artworks ==
- Four Freedoms 1943, Etching 30.1 x 22.8 cm
- Paradise Lost 1930, Etching in sepia 17.7 x 22.6 cm
- To Be or Not To Be 1942, Etching 30.3 x 22.8 cm
- Dr. Faustus 1947, Etching 30.1 x 22.6 cm

== Authored works ==
Fabri is responsible for books like: "Learn to Draw (1945), Oil Painting: How-to-Do-It! (1953), A Guide to Polymer Painting (1966), Sculpture in Paper (1966), Color: A Complete Guide for Artists (1967), Complete Guide to Flower Painting (1968), The First Hundred Years: History of the American Watercolor Society (1969), Painting Outdoors (1969), Painting Cityscapes (1970), and Artist's Guide to Composition (1971)" as provided by the Smithsonian.

== Exhibitions ==
An exhibit in his honor was held at the Charles Marvin Fairchild Memorial Gallery from December 1, 2000, to May 1, 2001. He also had some etching pieces inspired by music in the Binet Gallery in 1947.

Places like the Child's Gallery have also displayed his work. Mutual Art still auctions his works and as of March 2024, they still house over 40 of his works including Americana 1948 an etching and Cathedral View at Night in oil (no exact date).

== Honors and awards ==
Fabri was part of local art organizations referred to as the California Society of Etchers, the Society of American Graphic Artists, and contributed time to Boston and Washington in various printmaker organizations.

His piece To Be or Not To Be won the John Taylor Arms Prize from Society of American Etchers in 1943.
