= Pratt Graphic Art Center =

The Pratt Graphic Art Center also called the Pratt Graphics Center was a print workshop and gallery in New York. The Center grew out of Margaret Lowengrund's Contemporaries Graphic Art Centre. In 1956 Fritz Eichenberg became the Center's director, serving until 1972 . (Sources disagree on whether Lowengrund or Eichenberg should be considered the founder of the Pratt Graphic Art Center, with most claiming Eichenberg was the founder.) The Center was associated with the Pratt Institute, providing a space specifically for printmaking. It was used by both students and established artists including Jim Dine, Robert Motherwell, Barnett Newman, and Claes Oldenburg. Painter and printmaker Martin Barooshian served as Supervisor for the Center's Graphics Workshop for Professionals from 1960-1970, hired by Eichenberg at the behest of Stanley Hayter. The Workshop was a primary vehicle for the participation of established artists in the Center. The Center also published a journal, the Artist's Proof edited by Eichenberg and Andrew Stasik, and had an exhibition space. The Pratt Graphic Art Center closed in 1986.

The National Gallery of Art in Washington, DC has collected prints published by the Pratt Graphic Art Center. Artists represented in this collection include

- Al Blaustein
- Luis Camnitzer
- Albert Christ-Janer
- Roberto De Lamonica
- Arthur Deshaies
- Lucy Durand-Sikes
- Leonard Edmondson
- Fritz Eichenberg
- Barbro Forslund
- Sid Hammer
- Shigeru Izumi
- Lynda Kalman
- Ruth Kerkovius
- Po-Hyun Kim
- Michael Knigin
- Yasuhide Kobashi
- Lee Krasner
- Jacob Landau
- Seong Moy
- Carl Pickhardt
- Stephen Poleskie
- Michael Ponce de León
- Clayton Pond
- Walter Rogalski
- Clare Romano
- Andrew Stasik
- Valerie Thornton
- Vasilios Toulis
- Ansei Uchima
- Murray Zimiles
