= Toshiko Uchima =

Japanese-American artist (1918–2000)

Toshiko Uchima (Japanese: 内間俊子) (26 October 1918 – 18 December 2000) was a Japanese-American artist. She worked in a variety of media, including collage, box assemblage, oil paintings, woodblock prints and drawings.

== Early life and career ==
Uchima was born Toshiko Aohara on 26 October 1918 in Japanese-occupied northeast China and raised in the expatriate Japanese community in Dalian (known to the Japanese as "Dairen"), where she studied drawing and painting at the Dairen Art Studio. After her family returned to Japan in the late 1930’s, she attended Kobe College and studied with the painter Ryōhei Koiso. In the early 1950’s, Uchima, living in Tokyo, exhibited oil paintings at the Yomiuri Independent Show and was one of the first women to join the Democratic Artists Association (Demokrāto), a group of artists in different media founded by noted Japanese avant-garde artist Ei Q. As a member of Demokrāto, she made the acquaintance of, among others, art critic Sadajirō Kubo and poet Shūzō Takiguchi, whose poems, together with a portfolio of original prints, including Uchima’s, appeared in a 1954 limited edition work titled "Sphinx."

In 1955, she married Ansei Uchima, an artist best known as a woodblock printmaker. That year she co-founded, with Chizuko Yoshida, Reika Iwami and others, the Joryū Hanga Kyōkai (Japanese Women’s Print Association). She exhibited in its annual shows from 1956 to 1965. She also exhibited in the Grenchen International Print Biennale in 1958. In 1959, she left Japan with her husband and one-year-old son. The family settled in New York City in 1960. She participated in "Japan’s Modern Prints - Sosaku Hanga," the first comprehensive exhibition of sōsaku hanga from the early twentieth century to the present, in 1960 at the Art Institute of Chicago, and continued to produce prints for several years.

In the mid-1960’s, she turned to collage as a primary medium and, later, also produced box assemblages, using "objects as disparate as antique dolls, postage stamps, seashells, feathers and miniature angelic figures, each with a unique memory and history arranged into a ‘poetic theater’ which tells the story of times gone by and the impermanence of life." She regularly exhibited her collage and assemblage work in solo and group shows in New York and Japan.

In 1982, her husband suffered a stroke that ended his career. Uchima spent much of her time over the next 18 years caring for him. She continued to produce work in her limited time and exhibited her work throughout the 1980’s and 1990’s. She died on 18 December 2000.

== Selected Collections ==
United States

- Whitney Museum of American Art
- Brooklyn Museum
- RISD Museum
- Chazen Museum of Art, University of Wisconsin
- Smith College Museum of Art
- Jane Voorhees Zimmerli Museum, Rutgers University
- Grinnell College Museum of Art
- Princeton University Marquand Library (Sphinx)
- Cincinnati Art Museum

Japan

- Nerima Art Museum, Tokyo
- Museum of Modern Art, Wakayama, Japan
- Hiroshima City Museum of Contemporary Art, Japan
- Tochigi Prefectural Museum of Art, Utsunomiya, Japan
- Miyazaki Prefectural Art Museum, Japan
- Museum of Art, Kochi, Japan

Other

- Museo de Zaragoza, Spain

== Selected exhibitions ==
=== Solo exhibitions ===
- Striped House Museum of Art, Tokyo, 1994
- Cordy Gallery, New York, 1975
- Shirota Gallery, Tokyo, 1976
- Suzuki Gallery, New York, 1976, 1982, 1990
- Ginza Sanbangai Gallery, Tokyo, 1981
- Michigan State University,1963

=== Selected group exhibitions ===
- The Museum of Modern Art, Hayama, Traveling Exhibition "Ansei and Toshiko Uchima: Weaving Colors and Memories," 2026.
- Grenchen International Print Triennale, 1958
- Art Institute of Chicago, "Modern Japanese Prints – Sōsaku Hanga," 1960
- Jane Voorhees Zimmerli Museum, Rutgers University, "American Traditions/Modern Expressions: Asian American Artists and Abstraction 1945-1970," 1997 (traveling)
- Portland Art Museum, "Joryū Hanga Kyōkai, 1956-1965, Japan’s Women Printmakers," 2020-21
- RISD Museum, "Defying Boundaries: Women in Japanese Art," 2024
- Scholten Japanese Art, "Creative Connections: Sosaku-Hanga Artists & New York," 2024-25
- Pratt Graphic Art Center, Japanese Women’s Print Show, 1965
- Society of American Graphic Artists, 47th Annual Exhibition of The Society of American Graphic Artists, New York, 1966
- Centre Pompidou, Paris, "Japon des avant-gardes 1910-1970," 1986 (Sphinx)
- Museum of Modern Art, Saitama, "Demokrato 1957: Liberation Art in Postwar Japan," 1999
- Tochigi Prefectural Museum of Art, "Q Ei and the Avant-Garde Artists," 2014, "Japanese Women Artists of Avant-Garde Movements 1950-1975," 2005
- Nerima Art Museum Collection Exhibition, Tokyo 2016
- Hiroshima City Museum of Contemporary Art, "Women’s March," 2018
- Striped House Museum of Art, Tokyo, with Ansei Uchima, 1986, 1989, 1994, 1999, 2012
- Toki-no-Wasuremono Gallery, Tokyo, with Ansei Uchima, 2018
- Hunterdon Art Center, New Jersey, "Reflections, Images," three-person exhibition with Ansei Uchima and Isamu Noguchi, 1980
- Williamsburg Art & Historical Center, New York, "Friends and Mentors" (with Jack Lenor Larsen, Isamu Noguchi, Jerry Rudquist, Toshiko Takaezu, Ansei Uchima and Esteban Vicente), 2001
- Yomiuri Independent Exhibitions, Tokyo, 1952, 1953

== Selected publications ==
- Hanga Geijutsu, "Noteworthy Exhibition Uchima Ansei, Toshiko: Tracing the Creative Paths of Two Artists." No. 211, Spring 2026
- Hanga Geijutsu, "Pioneers of Women Printmakers". No. 208, Summer 2025
- Kuwahara, Noriko. Postwar Printmaking Exchanges between Japan and the United States: 1945-1965. (Tokyo: Serika Shobo, 2024)
- The Museum of Modern Art, Hayama; Hekinan City Fujii Tatsukichi Museum of Contemporary Art; The Museum of Modern Art, Saitama. Ansei and Toshiko Uchima: Weaving Colors and Memories. Exhibition Catalogue. (Tokyo: The Tokyo Shimbun, 2026)
- Wechsler, Jeffrey ed. Asian Traditions/Modern Expressions: Asian American Artists and Abstraction 1945-1970. (New York: Harry N. Abrams, 1997)
