= Shigeru Izumi =

Japanese artist

- Born: 1922; Osaka, Japan
- Died: 1995 (aged 72–73)
- Known for: Artist, educator

Shigeru Izumi (Japanese: 泉 茂, Hepburn: Izumi Shigeru) (1922–1995) was a Japanese painter and printmaker.

== Biography ==
Shigeru Izumi was born in 1922 in Osaka, Japan. He attended the Nakanoshima School of Western Art, and the Osaka City Kogei School (Osaka City School of Applied Arts), graduating in 1939.

In 1951 he established the Osaka demokurato bijutsu kyokai (Democratic Artists Association) with fellow artists Ei-Q and Yoshio Hayakawa. In 1959 he traveled to New York where he was guest professor at the Pratt Graphic Art Center. In 1963 he moved to Paris where he lived until around 1968, when he returned to Japan.

Shigeru Izumi taught at the Osaka University of Arts from 1970 through the early 1990s. Shigeru Izumi died in 1995.

His work is in the collections of the Harvard Art Museums, the Museum of Modern Art, the National Gallery of Art, and the Philadelphia Museum of Art. His work is also in the Carnegie Museum of Art, the Hyōgo Prefectural Museum of Art, the Machida City Museum of Graphic Arts, the Miyazaki Prefectural Art Museum, the Musée d'art moderne de la Ville de Paris, the National Museum of Art, Osaka, the National Museum of Modern Art, Kyoto, the National Museum of Modern Art, Tokyo, and the Tokushima Modern Art Museum.
