= Jan Gelb =

American artist, lithographer (1906 - 1978)

- Born: Jeannette Louise Gelb; 1906
- Died: 1978 (aged 71–72)
- Known for: Printmaker, educator
- Spouse: Boris Margo

Jan Gelb (1906-1978), born Jeannette Louise Gelb, was an American artist, lithographer, and educator.

== Biography ==
Gelb attended the Yale School of Art, graduating in 1927. Supporting herself as a public school teacher, Gelb moved to New York to continue her art studies at the Art Students League. She also joined the Society of American Graphic Artists where she exhibited her work in their annual exhibitions.

Gelb was married to fellow printmaker and artist Boris Margo (1902-1995), who was the inventor of the cellocut. This technique inspired Gelb to create a series of methods to make textural effects on intaglio plates, including spraying the plates with aerosol cans and scratching at them with sugar and carborundum.

In the 1930s, Gelb's prints were themed around cityscapes, urban scenes of laborers and portraits, later in the 1940s her style changed towards surrealism and dream symbolism. While working at Atelier 17 in the late 1940s, Gelb produced a relief series of dream-inspired etchings, printed with black ink.

Gelb first exhibited her work at the Provincetown Art Association in 1949.

Gelb's later prints, made in the 1950s until the early 1970s, were abstract and based around her favourite place, the dunes of Provincetown, Massachusetts, where she and her husband, Boris Margo, owned a beach shack.

Jan Gelb's work is held in the collections of the Metropolitan Museum of Art, the Museum of Modern Art, the Baltimore Museum, and the Philadelphia Museum.

== Exhibitions ==
1951 Annual Exhibition of Contemporary American Painting. Whitney Museum of American Art. November 8, 1951 – January 6, 1952

1953 Annual Exhibition of Contemporary American Painting. Whitney Museum of American Art. October 15 – December 6, 1953.

1956 Annual Exhibition: Sculpture, Paintings, Watercolors, Drawings. Whitney Museum of American Art. November 14, 1956 - January 6, 1957.

1956 Annual Exhibition of Contemporary American Sculpture, Watercolors and Drawings. Whitney Museum of American Art. April 18 – June 10, 1956.

1959 American Acquisitions: Recent Additions of Prints to the Museum Collection. MoMA. Apr 2–May 31, 1959.
