= Arthur Deshaies =

American painter

- Born: Arthur Emillien Deshaies; July 6, 1920; Providence, Rhode Island
- Died: July 11, 2011 (aged 91)

Arthur Deshaies (1920–2011) was an American printmaker and painter who made non-geometric abstractions in a style he called "abstract impressionist." After his death a curator described a dominant aspect of Deshaies' prints, calling them "biomorphic, surrealist fantasies." Deshaies showed frequently in commercial and academic galleries and in museums and his work frequently received critical notice. He employed traditional printmaking techniques and also used new techniques including one that he called stencil-offset and another which employed sheets of plastic as the matrix. His long career as an artist was matched by an equally long career as an art teacher.

== Early life and training ==
Deshaies was born and raised in and around Providence, Rhode Island. Drawn to art at a very young age, he once said that he made his first art prints at the age of ten using the hand wringer from his mother's washing machine. After he completed his high school education in 1940, he began studying art at Cooper Union in Manhattan. Having served in the Army for all of World War II, he enrolled at the Rhode Island School of Design and graduated in 1948 with a Bachelor of Fine Arts degree. He spent the next two years studying at Indiana University from which he received a Master of Fine Arts degree in 1950. He began teaching at Indiana while still a graduate student and continued as an art instructor and art professor until his retirement from a position at Florida State University in 1989. In 1952 he won a Fulbright grant for a year of study in France.

== Career in art ==
Beginning in 1950, his work regularly appeared in the National Print Exhibition at the Brooklyn Museum and in 1964 joined with the museum's print curator and the curator of the Hirshhorn Collection was on the jury that selected prints for the show. (Note: The first National Print Exhibition at the Brooklyn Museum was held in 1947. They were held annually for the first two decades or so and less frequently thereafter. The 26th (and last) was held in 2001.) In 1952 he was given a solo-exhibition at the Contemporaries gallery in Manhattan. (Note: Established by Margaret Lowengrund the same year, Contemporaries was a graphic arts gallery that represented printmakers and promoted the art of printmaking. Three years later, with the help of a Rockefeller, grant she opened a school called the Contemporaries Graphic Art Centre to which the Pratt Institute joined to form the Pratt-Contemporaries Graphic Art Center with Fritz Eichenberg as co-director.) He was given another solo show two years later, this one at Indiana University, and, later that year, was awarded first prize in painting by the Louisville Art Association. He showed the following year in a group exhibition at the Museum of Modern Art and in 1959 was given a solo show at Wittenborn's One-Wall Gallery. In 1955, 1961, and 1963 Deshaies' work was included in group exhibitions at the Whitney Museum of American Art.

During the 1960s Deshaies exhibited in group and solo shows both in Manhattan and out of town, including an exhibition of 55 prints by 48 artists at the National Gallery of Art, a traveling exhibition of 30 prints by 24 artists sponsored by the United States Information Agency, and a solo exhibition in Manhattan's Village Art Center. In 1961 he was awarded a Guggenheim Fellowship. (Note: This grant, by temporarily relieving them from some of the regular duties of their lives, gave established professionals a degree of creative freedom that they could not otherwise enjoy.) During the 1950s and 1960s he also received MacDowell Colony and Yaddo fellowships, and a Tiffany Foundation award.

After his appointment as professor of art at Florida State University in 1963, Deshaies was represented by commercial galleries in Tallahassee, Sarasota, and Jacksonville. During this period he showed less frequently, mostly in group shows at colleges and universities. In 1987, on the occasion of a solo exhibition of his paintings and mixed-media assemblages on paper, a critic described Deshaies as a man who "hasn't lost his infatuation with hues, textures and deftly wrought abstract compositions." After he retired from Florida State University in 1989, Deshaies moved his studio to Duncan, South Carolina, and began to make more acrylic paintings on canvas than he had earlier in his career. In 1991 he was given a solo exhibition of his paintings at Florida State University. In 1995 he participated in a three-artist show called "Painting With Light" at Florida Atlantic University. Two years later he was given a solo exhibition at the State Street Gallery in Sarasota. He was given solo museum shows in 2001 and 2009 at Greenville County Museum of Art and Florida State University, respectively.

=== Artistic style and critical reception ===
Arthur Deshaies, Chinese Carnival, stencil offset, about 1952

Arthur Deshaies, The Alchemist 2, wood engraving, about 1955, 20 x 23 3/4 inches

Arthur Deshaies, Cycle of a Large Sea: Night Sea Journey of Jan. 1962, relief from plaster print, 1962, 38 x 60 inches

Arthur Deshaies, Untitled, acrylic, 2004, 72 x 58 3/4 inches

Late in life Deshaies told an interviewer that his interest in abstract art dated back to his youth. "Even as a child," he said, "I wasn't interested in drawing people or things. I was putting colors together and making designs." As noted above, his desire to make prints had an equally early start. Like his contemporaries among the abstract expressionists, Deshaies made exclusively non-geometric designs, mostly having natural objects as their subjects. In 1997, looking back on his early career, he said he was influenced by the work of two ground-breaking painters from Barcelona, Joan Miró and Antoni Tàpies, both of whom permitted unconscious impulses play a role in their creative work. After his death a curator described this aspect of Deshaies' prints, calling them "biomorphic, surrealist fantasies."

In the early 1950s Deshaies made prints by a technique that he called stencil-offset, which a critic said, used "bright and unequivocal color" with strength and precision to achieve a gracefulness of forms. One of these offset prints was a surprising seven feet long by seven inches wide. In 1955 he described his abstractions as symbols that did not represent any entity already in existence, but rather were themselves reference points to which newly created entities might find links. He said: "To give a signification to new signs, the reinvention of signs is the measure for individual integrity. Up to now, the process of 'signification' was: a thing was given and a sign was invented for it. Now, a sign will be given; it will be valid if it finds its incarnation."

One of his early prints, "Chinese Carnival" (shown at left) drew repeated notice from New York critics and was reproduced in both the New York Times and the bulletin of the Brooklyn Museum.

In the mid-1950s Deshaies made wood engravings, retaining much of the gestural abstract style he had adopted for his earlier stencil-offset prints. "The Alchemist 2," shown at right, is an example of this technique. Writing in the College Art Journal, a critic praised this print for both its aesthetic qualities and its technical facility, saying it was one of the most impressive prints in the traveling exhibition in which it appeared. At about the same time he also began using large sheets of Lucite and Plexiglas. A curator described his method: he would place a drawing under the clear sheet as a guide, and work up the matrix using a variety of tools, including an electric router. "He would then run an ink-charged roller over the plate (checking the evenness and density of the ink by holding the plate to the light), leaving uninked the intricate and swirling network of incised lines." He also began making plaster relief prints. Some of the prints that he made by these methods were inspired by ocean life, believing, as he said, "that man’s turmoil, his disaster and triumph, parallel the turmoil and disaster, and the triumph of the sea." "Night Sea Journey," shown at left, is an example of his plaster relief technique.

At some point during the 1970s or 1980s, Deshaies began to make mixed-media assemblages on paper and acrylic paintings on canvas In 1991 Deshaies wrote that his work at that time exposed chaos rather than attempting to bring order to it. He said: "The confusion is all around us and our only chance is to let it in. The only chance is to open our eyes and see the mess." In 1995 a critic said the paintings he made at this time contained highly colored lush Florida-tropical colors. He wrote that they revealed "incandescent sensations through layers of heightened colors applied to paper and canvas." Two years later, describing a set of paintings called the "Universe Series," another critic noted colors that were "transparent, superimposed and incandescent." An untitled painting of 2004, shown at right, is an example of his work in acrylics at this time. At the age of 80 Deshaies told an interviewer that he was an abstract impressionist.

== Career in teaching ==
Deshaies began his teaching career in 1949 as an instructor at Indiana University where he was enrolled in the graduate program of the School of Fine Arts. He continued teaching there after receiving his master's degree and also taught during the summer months at the art colony in Ogunquit, Maine. In 1956 he began teaching at the Pratt Institute and in 1963 joined the faculty at the Florida State University College of Fine Arts. He continued there, as head of the graphic workshop, until his retirement in 1989.

== Personal life and family ==
Deshaies was born Arthur Emillien Deshaies on July 6, 1920. (Note: An obituary says the birth date may have been June 6, but offers no evidence. Four public records give July 6 and none are found giving June 6.) His father was Arthur Oliver Deshaies. Of Canadian heritage, Arthur Oliver Deshaies had been born in Rhode Island about 1901. Arthur Emillien Deshaies' mother was Emilienne Vue Deshaies, She was born December 23, 1896, in Uzay-le-Venon, France. The Arthur Oliver and Emilienne were married in Saint-Doulchard, France, on March 4, 1918, when he was about 17 and she 22. The location and timing suggest that she was a war bride. The family lived in Woonsocket, R.I. where Arthur Oliver Deshaies worked as a shoe repairer in a cobbler shop. Deshaies had a younger sister, Carmen Constance, born 1922. When Deshaies was in his senior year of high school in Burrillville, Carmen, having dropped out after eighth grade, was working as a doffer in a local worsted mill.

At some time in the 1930s Emilienne married Roland Beaudry. He was born in Quebec on June 17, 1904, and was employed as a fireman in the boiler room of the Rhode Island State Sanitarium (Burrillville, R.I.).

Deshaies joined the United States Army soon after the outbreak of World War II. He served as a paratrooper in the Pacific Theater both as combat soldier and war artist. Long afterward, a curator remarked that this was the only occasion in which he worked in a realistic style.

Deshaies was married twice. In the early 1950s he married Ruth Dryden, an artist. They had a daughter, Mignon. In 1960 the writer, Kay Boyle, reported in a letter that she had become infatuated with Deshaies. The editor of her letters said that in 1959 the two of them had begun "an intimate and stormy relationship." In about 1995 Deshaies married Maxine Seay, a nurse. She had been previously married and had three daughters and two sons by her previous marriage. The couple lived in Duncan, South Carolina, the town where Seay had been born and raised. Deshaies died on July 30, 2011, in Spartanburg, South Carolina.
