= Irving Amen =

American painter (1918–2011)

- Born: 1918; New York City, United States
- Died: 2011 (aged 92–93); Coconut Creek, Florida
- Known for: Painting; Sculpture; Printmaking
- Website: www.IrvingAmen.com

Irving Amen (1918–2011) was an American painter, printmaker and sculptor.

== Life ==
Born in New York City in 1918, Amen began drawing at the age of four. A scholarship to the Pratt Institute was awarded to him when he was fourteen years old.

From 1942 to 1945 he served with the Armed Forces. He headed a mural project and executed murals in the United States and Belgium.

His first exhibition of woodcuts was held at the New School for Social Research and his second at the Smithsonian Institution in 1949. He also exhibited at the Artists House in Jerusalem, the Library of Congress, and the National Academy of Design.

Amen studied in Paris in 1950. Upon his return to the United States, he had one man shows in New York and Washington DC.

In 1953, Amen traveled throughout Italy. This resulted in a series of eleven woodcuts, eight etchings and a number of oil paintings. One of these woodcuts, "Piazza San Marco #4" and its four woodblocks constitute a permanent exhibit of block printing in color at the Smithsonian Institution.

Travel in Israel, Greece and Turkey in 1960 led to a retrospective show at the Artist's House in Jerusalem. His art is widely owned and loved. Irving Amen has taught at Pratt Institute and at the University of Notre Dame. He had a show of woodcuts at the Artists Studio in NYC.

In 1974 he illustrated The Epic of Gilgamesh in linocuts and woodcuts for the Limited Editions Club. He designed a set of stained glass windows depicting the Twelve Tribes of Israel for Agudas Achim Synagogue in Bexley, Ohio. His work often depicts themes of Judaism, chess, people, music, Italy and Don Quixote. In his later years he lived and worked in Boca Raton, Florida.

Commissions include a Peace Medal in honor of the Vietnam War. He created designs for 12 stained glass windows 16 feet high depicting the Twelve Tribes of Israel, commissioned by Agudas Achim Synagogue in Columbus, Ohio.

He is listed in Mantle Fielding's Dictionary of American Painters, Sculptors and Engravers and the Dictionary of Contemporary American Artists by Paul Cummings. Amen was also a member of the Society of American Graphic Artists. He was elected member of Accademia Fiorentina Delle Arti Del Disegno, an organization to which Michelangelo, his idol, belonged.

Born in New York City, he taught at the Pratt Institute and at the University of Notre Dame in the early 1960s.

== Notable collections – U.S. ==
- Museum of Modern Art, New York
- National Museum of American History, Washington, D.C.
- The Metropolitan Museum of Art, New York
- The National Gallery of Art Washington
- University of South Alabama – Mobile, Alabama
- Arizona State University – Tempe, Arizona
- Tucson Museum of Art – Tucson, Arizona
- Arkansas Art Center Foundation – Little Rock, Arkansas
- Arkansas State University – State University, Arkansas
- Judah L. Magnes Memorial Museum – Berkeley, California
- Skirball Museum Hebrew Union College – Los Angeles, California'
- Mills College – Oakland, California
- Stanford University Museum of Art – Stanford, California
- Hausatonic Museum – Bridgeport, Connecticut
- Yale University – New Haven, Connecticut
- University of Georgia – Athens, Georgia
- Honolulu Academy of Arts – Honolulu, Hawaii
- Art Institute of Chicago – Chicago, Illinois
- Quincy College Art Gallery – Quincy, Illinois
- Rosary College – River Forest, Illinois
- Illinois State Museum – Springfield, Illinois
- Lafayette Art Center – Lafayette, Indiana
- Art Gallery, University of Notre Dame – Notre Dame, Indiana
- Davenport Municipal Art Gallery – Davenport, Iowa
- Des Moines Art Center – Des Moines, Iowa
- University of Maine Art Gallery – Orono, Maine
- Baltimore Museum of Art – Baltimore, Maryland
- Boston Museum of Fine Arts – Boston, Massachusetts
- Harvard Art Museum – Boston, Massachusetts
- Town of Brookline Public Library – Brookline, Massachusetts
- Fogg Art Museum – Cambridge, Massachusetts
- De Cordova and Dana Museum – Lincoln, Massachusetts
- Art Museum Mount Holyoke College – South Hadley, Massachusetts
- Museum of Fine Arts – Springfield, Massachusetts
- Albion College – Albion, Michigan
- University of Minnesota – Minneapolis, Minnesota
- Central Missouri State University – Warrensburg, Missouri
- Art Gallery University of Nebraska – Lincoln, Nebraska
- The Art Museum Princeton University – Princeton, N.J.
- Dartmouth College – Hanover, New Hampshire
- Rutgers University – New Brunswick, New Jersey
- Museum of New Mexico – Santa Fe, New Mexico
- Jewish Museum – New York City, N.Y.
- New York Public Library – New York City, N.Y.
- State University of New York – New Paltz, N.Y.
- University of Rochester Memorial Art Gallery – Rochester, N.Y.
- Syracuse University Art Collection – Syracuse, N.Y.
- Asheville Art Museum, Asheville, North Carolina
- Salem College – Winston-Salem, North Carolina
- Cincinnati Art Museum – Cincinnati, Ohio
- Dayton Art Institute – Dayton, Ohio
- Butler Institute of American Art – Youngstown, Ohio
- Oklahoma Museum of Art – Oklahoma City, Oklahoma
- Coos Art Museum – Coos Bay, Oregon
- Oregon State University – Corvallis, Oregon
- Lehigh University – Bethlehem, Pennsylvania
- City of Philadelphia Public Library – Philadelphia, Pennsylvania
- Philadelphia Museum of Art – Philadelphia, Pennsylvania
- Museum of Art – Carnegie Institute – Pittsburgh, Pennsylvania
- The Charleston Museum – Charleston, South Carolina
- Colombia Museum of Art – Columbia, South Carolina
- Brooks Memorial Art Gallery – Memphis, Tennessee
- Virginia Museum of Fine Arts – Richmond, Virginia
- Corcoran Gallery of Art – Washington, D.C.
- Library of Congress – Washington, D.C.
- Smithsonian American Art Museum – Washington, D.C.
- Huntington Galleries – Huntington, West Virginia
- Madison Art Center – Madison, Wisconsin
- Neville Public Museum – Green Bay, Wisconsin
- Milwaukee Public Library – Milwaukee, Wisconsin
- Topeka and Shawnee County Public Library – Topeka, Kansas

== Notable collections – international ==
- Albertina Museum – Vienna, Austria
- Bibliothèque Royal – Brussels, Belgium
- University Art Museum – Edmonton, Canada
- Fitzwilliam Museum – Cambridge, England
- Usher Gallery – Lincolnshire, England
- Victoria and Albert Museum – London, England
- Biblioteheque Nationale – Paris, France
- Bezalel National Museum – Jerusalem, Israel
- Auckland City Art Gallery – Auckland, New Zealand
- Statische Museum – Elberfeld, Germany

== Commissions ==
- Designed a Peace Medal to commemorate the end of the Vietnam War.
- Illustrated the classic, GILGAMESH, for the Limited Editions Club.
- Created Designs for twelve stained glass windows sixteen feet high depicting the twelve tribes of Israel, commissioned by Agudas Achim Synagogue at Columbus, Ohio.
