= William Auerbach-Levy =

American cartoonist

- Born: 14 February 1889
- Died: 29 June 1964
- Awards: Guggenheim Fellowship (1928)

William Auerbach-Levy (February 14, 1889 – June 29, 1964) was a Belarusian-born American artist of Jewish origin known for his paintings, etchings and caricatures.

== Life and career ==
Auerbach-Levy was Jewish, was born in Brest in Belarus (at that time Brest-Litovsk, Russian Empire), and emigrated with his family to the United States in 1894. He studied in New York City and Paris, and subsequently taught at the Educational Alliance Art School and the National Academy of Design. In 1928 he was awarded a Guggenheim Fellowship. He was elected into the National Academy of Design as an Associate member in 1926, and became a full member in 1958.

Auerbach-Levy authored several books on the art of caricature, and his work in that vein, often featuring celebrities and theatrical personalities as his subjects, appeared in The New Yorker, Vanity Fair and American Heritage.

He was a member of the Society of American Graphic Artists.

His wife, Florence Von Wien, who collaborated with him on one of his books, died in 1957. Auerbach-Levy died at the age of 75 on June 29, 1964, in Ossining, New York.

Caricature of Franklin Pierce Adams by William Auerbach-Levy.

His works are in the collections of the Art Institute of Chicago, the Boston Museum of Fine Arts, the New York Public Library, the Library of Congress, the Cleveland Museum of Art and Luther College.

== Publications ==
- Auerbach-Levy, William and Von Wien, Florence. Is That Me? A Book About Caricature. New York, NY: Watson-Guptill Publications, 1947.
- Auerbach-Levy, William. The Art of Caricature. Art Book Guild of America, 1947.
