= Gerson Leiber =

American sculptor (1921–2018)

Gerson Leiber (November 12, 1921 – April 28, 2018) was an American painter, lithographer and sculptor.

== Biography ==
Gerson Leiber was born November 12, 1921, in Brooklyn, New York, and raised in Titusville, in northwest Pennsylvania. He served in the United States Army and was assigned to its Signal Corps, during World War II. He met his future wife, Judith Peto while serving overseas in Budapest. They married in 1946 and moved back to the United States, eventually settling in New York City. He enrolled in classes at the Art Students League of New York, and studied with Will Barnet and took engraving classes at Brooklyn Museum Art School.

Leiber's work has been exhibited in more than 200 national and international shows including the Long Island Museum of American Art, History, and Carriages, the Kennedy Galleries and The Israel Museum. His work is part of many permanent collections around the world at the Metropolitan Museum of Art, the Smithsonian, the Brooklyn Museum, the Malmo Museum in Sweden, the Seattle Museum of Art and others. Between 1953 and 1985, he received more than 30 awards and prizes for his work and was a member of the Society of American Graphic Artists.

In recent years, Leiber and his wife, famous handbag designer Judith Leiber, mounted joint exhibitions of their work both on Long Island and in Manhattan. Leiber died on April 28, 2018, the same day as his wife, who died a few hours later. They were buried together.
