= Martin Levine =

Martin Levine (born 14 May 1945 in New York City) is an American artist.

Levine works mainly in etching and lithography, depicting realistically rendered cityscapes. His work has been included extensively in both international and American invitational and juried exhibitions, and his prints and drawings are in many important collections, including the Brooklyn Museum, the Museum of Fine Arts in Boston, the Art Institute of Chicago, and the Victoria and Albert Museum in London. He has been on the jury for numerous international exhibitions, including Biennials in Varna, Bulgaria; Lodz, Poland; Belgrade, Serbia; and Bristol, England. He is the former president of the Society of American Graphic Artists and was elected to the National Academy of Design in 1997. He has taught at the State University of New York at Stony Brook since 1986.

Levine has received over 120 national and international awards, notably at the Society of American Graphic Artists National Print Exhibition; National Academy of Design Annual Exhibition; Bienal de Ibiza Grafic Internacional Exhibition, Spain; and the Library of Congress National Exhibition of Prints. He was a recipient of a National Endowment for the Arts Fellowship in Printmaking in 1976.
