= Judith Leiber =

Hungarian-American fashion designer and businesswoman (1921–2018)

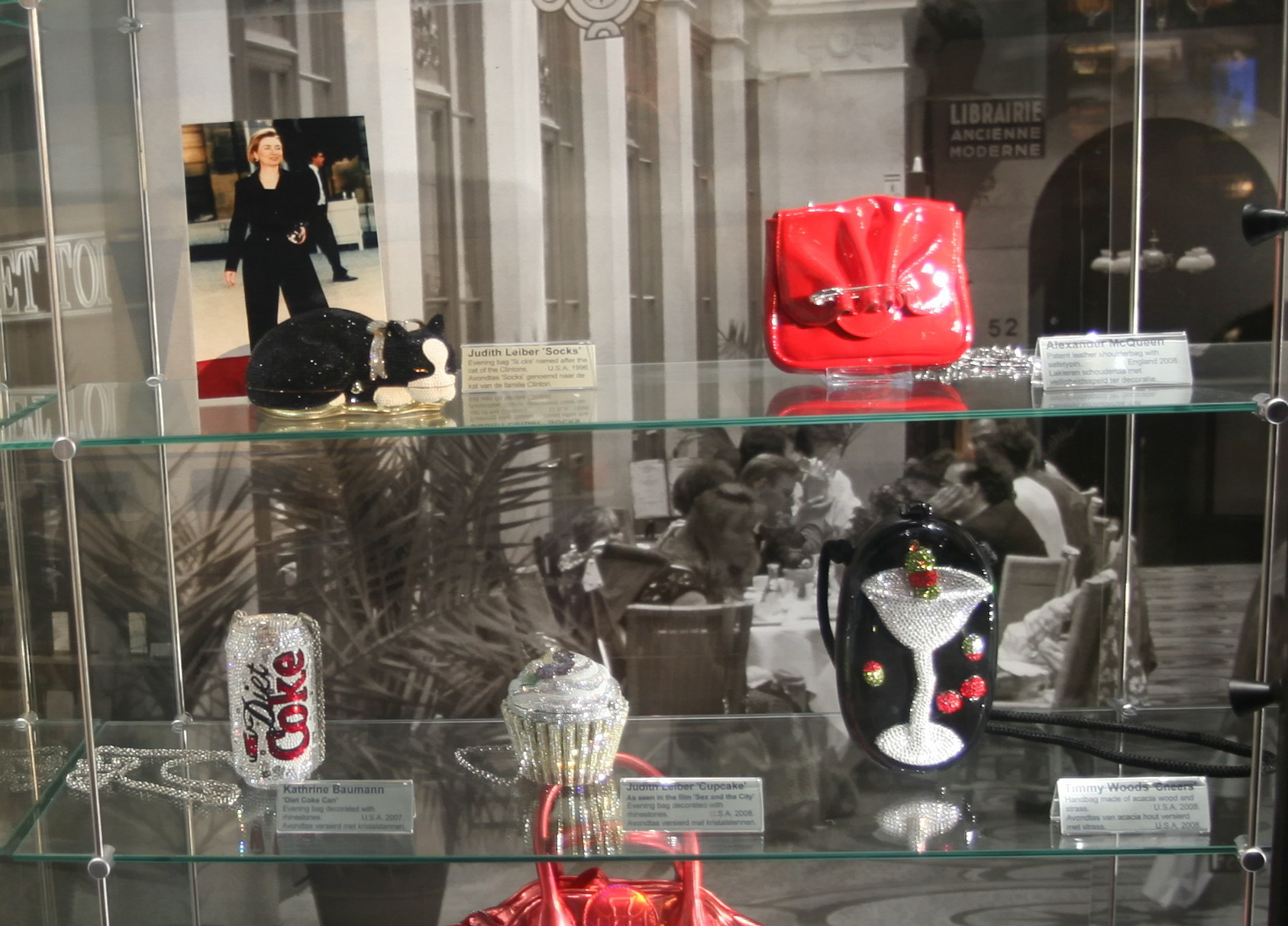
- Leiber's "Socks" and "Cupcake" models at the Museum of Bags and Purses in Amsterdam
- Born: Judit Pető; January 11, 1921; Budapest, Kingdom of Hungary
- Died: April 28, 2018 (aged 97); Springs, New York, U.S.
- Occupation: Founder of Judith Leiber
- Spouse: Gerson Leiber (m. 1946; their deaths 2018)
- Website: JudithLeiber.com

Judith Leiber (born Judit Pető; January 11, 1921 – April 28, 2018) was a Hungarian-American fashion designer and businesswoman.

== Life and career ==
Leiber was born Judit Pető in 1921 in Budapest, Hungary, to Helene, a Vienna-born homemaker, and Emil, a commodities broker, both of Hungarian-Jewish descent. She also had one sister named Eva. Leiber was sent to King's College London in 1938 by her family to study chemistry for the cosmetics industry, in part since her father thought she would be safer in London in the case of a war.

She returned to Hungary before World War II, where thanks to family connections she obtained a traineeship at a handbag company, where she learned to cut and mold leather, make patterns, frame and stitch bags. She was the first woman graduated to master craftswoman, becoming the first woman to join the Hungarian Handbag Guild in Budapest.

She avoided Nazi persecution when she escaped the Holocaust of World War II to the safety of a house set aside for Swiss citizens, when her father, a Hungarian Jew who managed the grain department of a bank, was able to obtain a Swiss schutzpass, a document that gave the bearer safe passage. This pass is on view at the Holocaust Museum in Washington DC. The flat where Leiber survived the war housed 26 people.

In December 1944, those living in the apartment were taken to one of the Hungarian Nazi-run ghettos. After the liberation of Hungary by the Red Army, Leiber's family moved into a basement with 60 other people.

In 1946, she married Gerson Leiber (Gus), who was a sergeant in the United States Army serving in Eastern Europe. They met when she was making purses for the secretaries of the American Legation in Budapest, and they moved to New York City in 1947. He was an abstract expressionist painter, member of the National Academy of Design, with some of his works displayed at the Philadelphia Museum of Art, the Smithsonian Museum, the Israel Museum in Jerusalem, and other institutions.

== Fashion career ==
After working as a handbag designer for other companies, Leiber founded her own business in 1963. She is known for her crystal minaudières, evening purses made of a metal shell often encrusted with Swarovski crystals, plated with silver or gold and with various forms, such as baby pigs, slices of watermelon, cupcakes, peacocks, penguins, and snakes. Sold at exclusive boutiques around the world, her purses may cost up to several thousand dollars and have become a status symbol for many women, including several Presidential First Ladies to whom she has given them as a present, from Mamie Eisenhower to Barbara Bush and Hillary Clinton. Animals are a recurring theme in her designs, and often ornament the most expensive purses of the collection, with prices on some animal-shaped minaudières exceeding US$7,000. Some wealthy women collect them; Bernice Norman, an arts patron in New Orleans, owns close to 300 of the Leiber bags.

In 1994, Leiber received a Lifetime Achievement Award from the Council of Fashion Designers. She retired in 1998. In September 2008, she was rated the most prestigious luxury handbag brand for the second year running by the New York-based Luxury Institute. In 2010, Leiber received a Visionary Woman Award from Moore College of Art & Design. Examples of her work can be found in the permanent collections of the Smithsonian Institution in Washington, DC, the Metropolitan Museum of Art in New York City, and the Victoria and Albert Museum in London. The Taubman Museum of Art in Roanoke, Virginia, has had a gallery of her work on display since it opened in 2008.

The Leibers bought property in Springs, New York in 1956 and it became their primary residence in 2011. In 2005 they opened the Leiber Museum across the street from their home to display the bags as well as paintings by Gerson Leiber. The Leibers sought to buy back an example of all of the purses to be displayed at the museum. The museum also displays various awards including the 1973 Coty Award.

== Stores ==
The Judith Leiber boutiques are exclusive as there are only four in the world. They are located in New Delhi, Jakarta, Singapore and Kuala Lumpur. However, some of her collection is available at selected fashion stores like Neiman Marcus, Harvey Nichols, Lane Crawford, Holt Renfrew, Harrods, and Saks Fifth Avenue.

== Death ==
Leiber died at her home in Springs, New York, on April 28, 2018, just a few hours after her husband Gerson Leiber had died.
