= DeAnn L. Prosia =

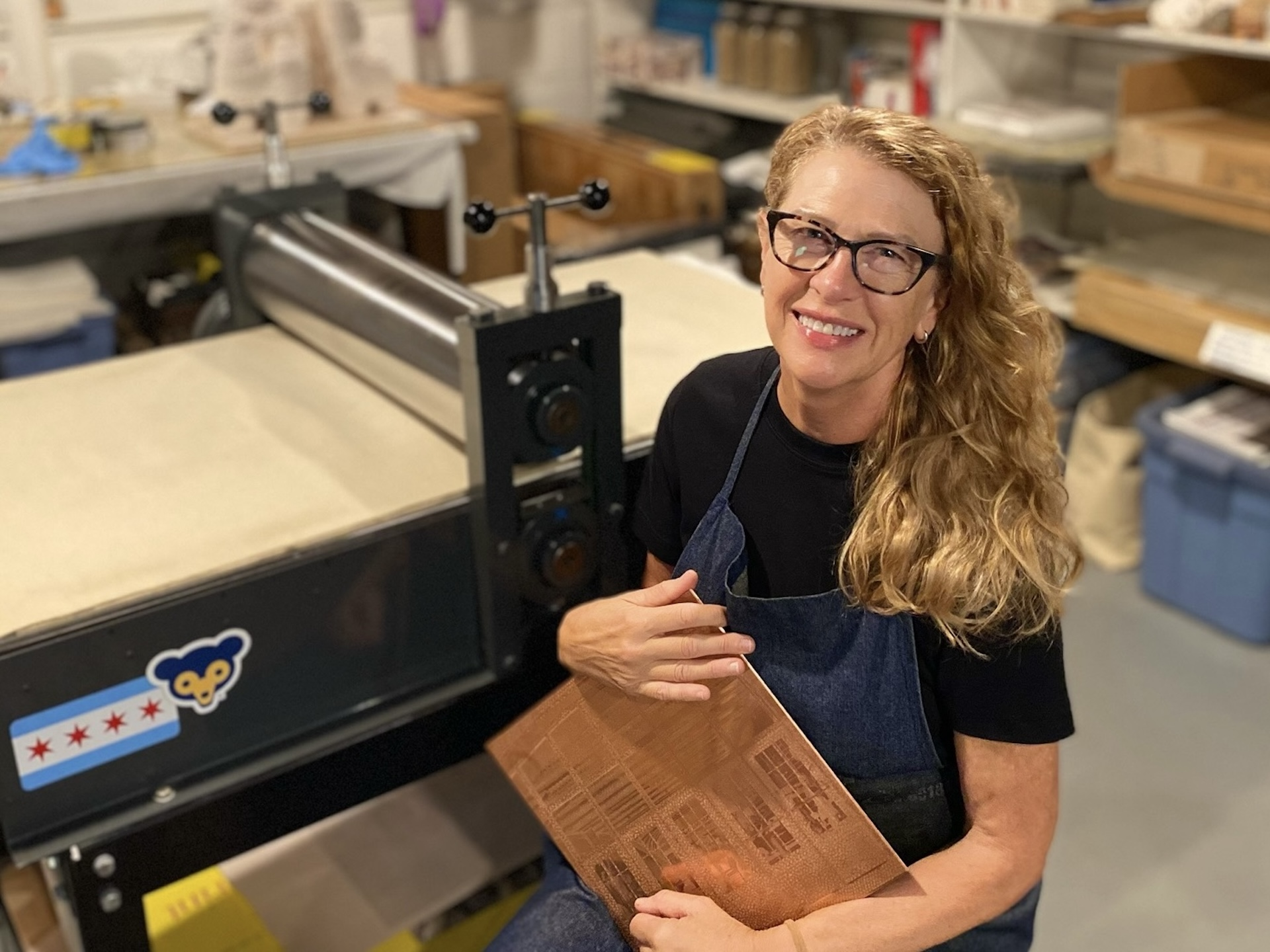
DeAnn L. Prosia in her etching studio, 2024

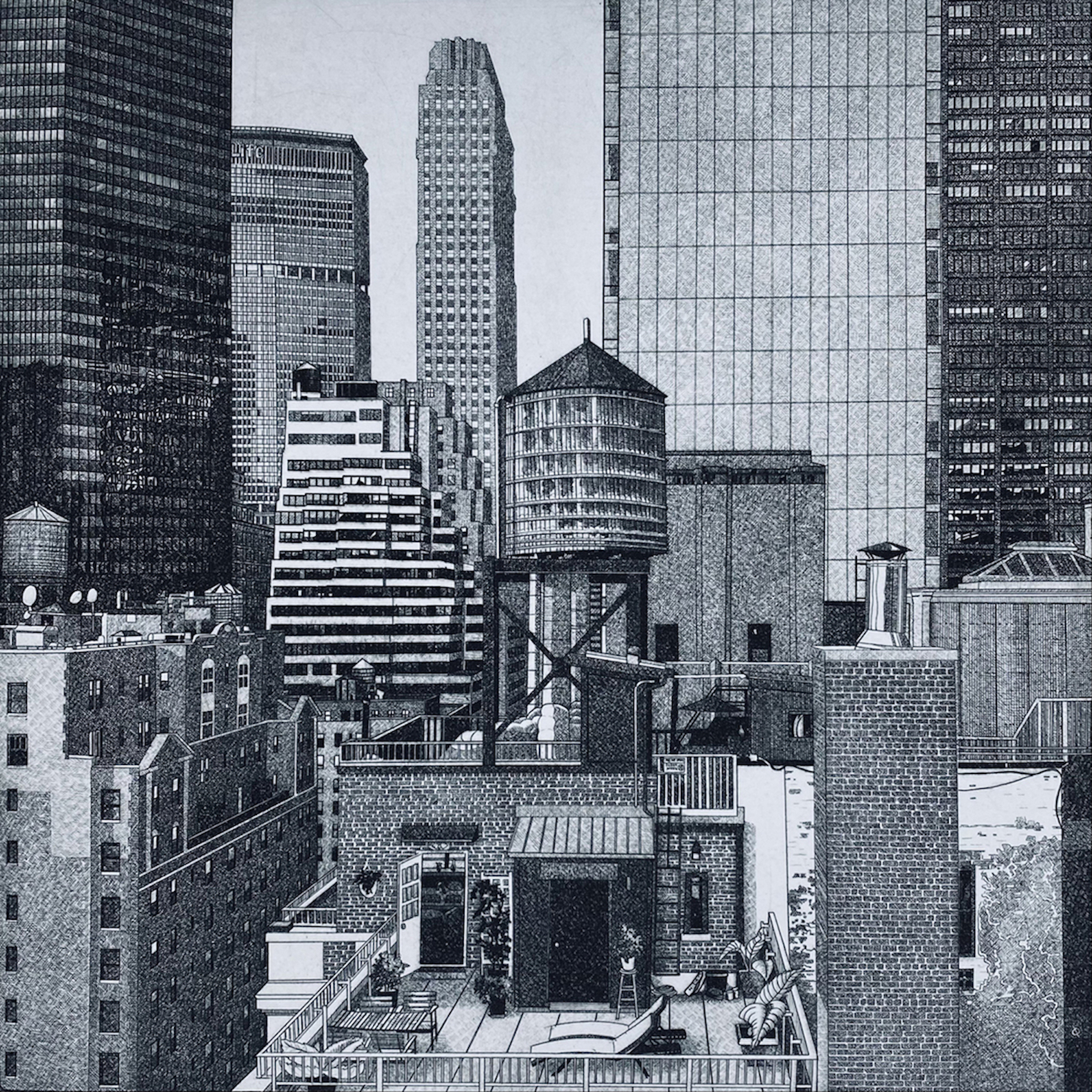
DeAnn L. Prosia, "Oasis", line etching, 12x12 inches, 2022

DeAnn L. Prosia (born March 22, 1963, in Chicago, IL) is an American printmaker, known for her photo-realist architectural line etchings, an intalgio printmaking process that can take her up to 400 hours to complete. Prosia has won over a hundred awards for her artwork and is in private and public collections, such as the Rockwell Museum, the New York Public Library Print Collection, and the Syracuse University Art Collection.

== Process ==
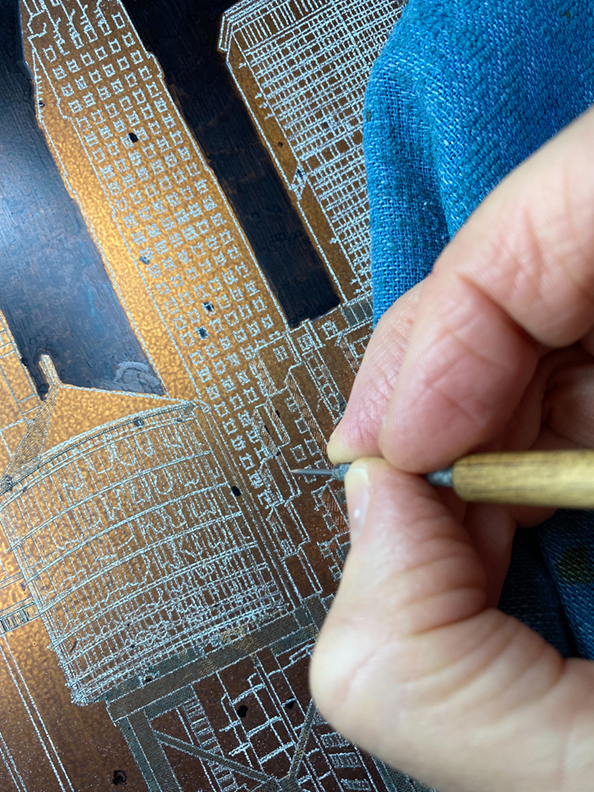
Detail of artist DeAnn L. Prosia working on her line etching, "Oasis"

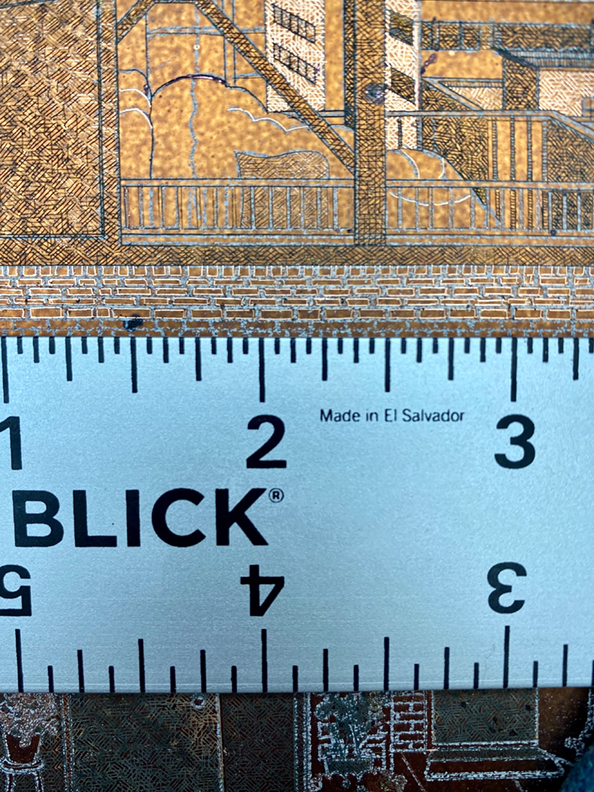
Detail of one of DeAnn L. Prosia’s etching plates with a ruler to show the scale of her line work

As a printmaker, Prosia utilizes only line work, in the form of cross-hatching, in her etchings to create the structure, tone, texture, and contrast of her highly detailed cityscapes. Line etching is an intalgio printmaking process where acid is used to cut into the unprotected parts of a metal place to create a design. Prosia uses a sharp sewing needle as her scribe, allowing her to build highly detailed imagery with only the use of line.

== Education and career ==
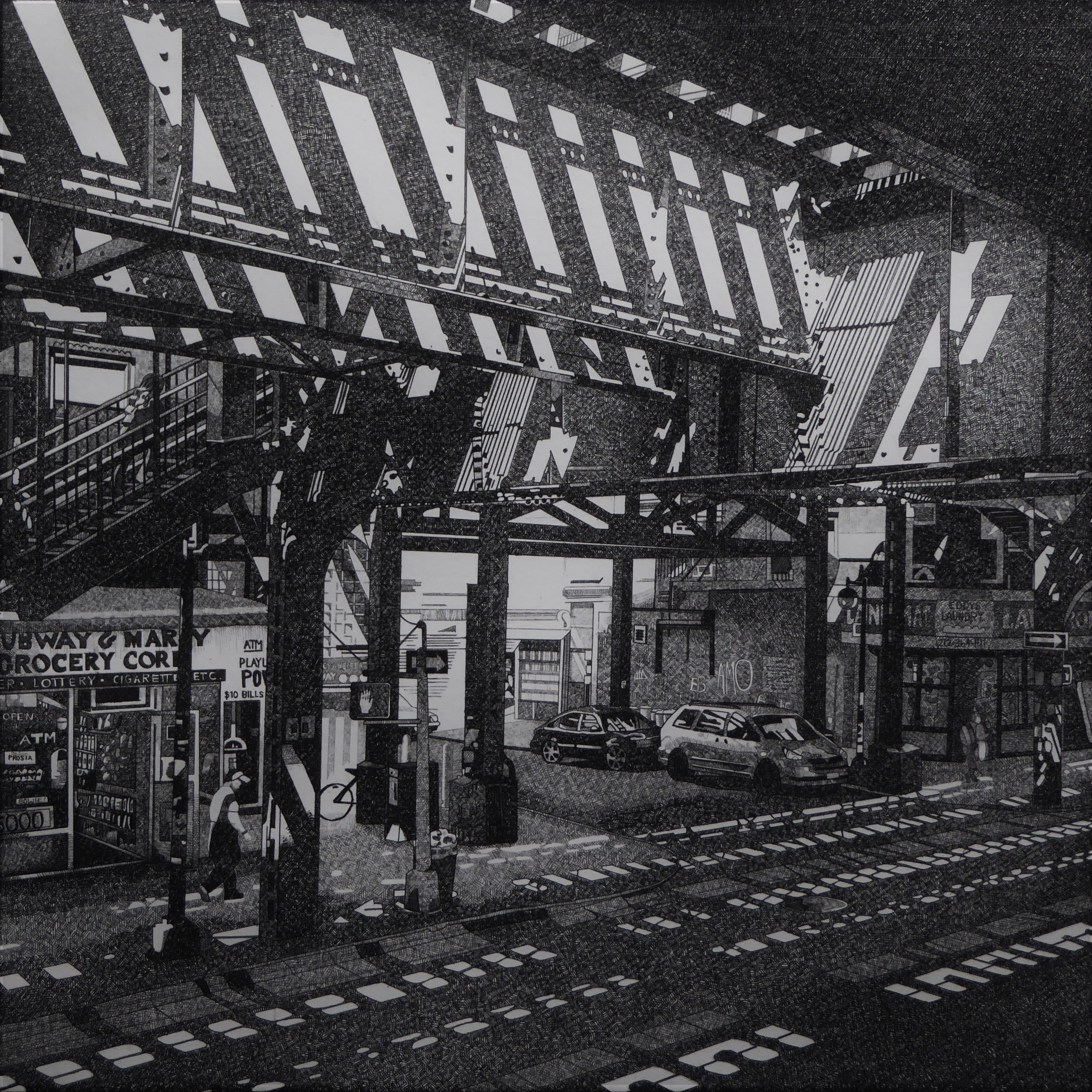
DeAnn L. Prosia, "Under the Elevated", line etching, 12×12 inches, 2016

Prosia attended Prospect High School in Mount Prospect, IL (a northwest suburb of Chicago), where her interest in art developed and was encouraged by her art teachers. This is also where she made her very first etching using a zinc plate with nitric acid. She later attended Northern Illinois University where she earned a BA in Communication Studies with a focus in Advertising and a minor in Art. Prosia also studied pastel drawing with artist Nina Weiss and took life drawing classes at the Art Institute of Chicago.

Prosia's commitment to printmaking came in 1988 when she met a Chicago printmaker, Phillip C. Thompson, whose architectural style, line work, and tone caught her eye. Over a three-day period, he taught her the basics of printmaking. On the fourth day, she ordered her first printing press from Blick, set it up in her Chicago studio apartment, and got to work creating etchings. In 1990, with Thompson's help, she started doing weekend art festivals.

In the mid-1990s, Prosia left Chicago and spent a year and a half in Erlanger, KY. From there she moved to Monroe, CT, where she became a member of the Silvermine Art Guild and the Society of American Graphic Artists (SAGA) in New York City. In 2002 The Old Print Shop in NYC, began representing her (2002–present).

From 2006–2009, Prosia lived in Mainz, Germany. In 2007, she had her first international solo exhibition, "Etchings of DeAnn Prosia" at Art'N'Act Galerie. Her second international solo exhibition followed in 2009, "Mein Mainz", at Eisenturm Galerie. Art Critic and Reporter for the (Mainz Rhine Newspaper) Martina Koch said of Prosia’s etchings: "When you stand in front of DeAnn L. Prosia's etchings, sometimes you long for a magnifying glass. Her views of the city are so finely drawn and rich in detail that the first fleeting glance is hardly enough to grasp them."

After returning to the States in December 2009, Prosia settled in Newtown, CT (the same town Martin Lewis lived in from 1932–1936). During this time she became more involved in museum and gallery exhibitions which helped get her work into several prominent collections (see list below). In 2010, she gained representation through the ebo Gallery in Millwood, NY (2010–present). Prosia also began to affiliate herself with prominent art organizations such as The Allied Artists of America, New York, NY; The Boston Printmakers, Boston, MA; The Audubon Artists, New York, NY; American Women Artists, Lodi, CA; Catharine Lorillard Wolfe Art Club, New York, NY; Center for Contemporary Printmaking, Norwalk, CT; and The Print Club of Albany, Albany, NY. In 2020, Prosia was added to the roster of represented artists at fYREGALLERY in Braidwood, New South Wales, Australia (2020–present).

From 2019–2021, Prosia served as Vice President of SAGA, and from 2021–2023 she served as President. Some of her most notable accomplishments included securing a member show at The Gallery at The Met Store at the Metropolitan Museum of Art and establishing the annual national juried print exhibition, Mini Gems, in 2022.

== Influences and style ==
Prosia draws her influences from the printmakers of the early 1900s such as John Taylor Arms (1887–1953), Martin Lewis (1881–1962), Ernest D. Roth (13) (1879–1953), and Samuel Chamberlain (1895–1975). She has always been fascinated by how society has historically built beautiful and interesting architecture to fill the needs of people and their everyday lives.

== Representation ==
- The Old Printshop, New York, NY (2002–present)
- ebo Gallery, Millwood, NY since 2010
- fYRE GALLERY, Braidwood, Australia since 2020

== Collections (public & private) ==
- Rockwell Museum, Corning, NY (A Smithsonian Affiliate)
- New York Public Library Print Collection, New York, NY
- International Exlibris Centre, Sint-Niklaas, Belgium
- Graphic Gallery Fund Collection, Varna, Bulgaria
- Jundt Art Museum, Gonzaga University, Spokane, WA
- Fort Wayne Museum of Art, Fort Wayne, IN
- Gormley Gallery Collection, Notre Dame of Maryland University, MD
- Rutgers University Archives, New Jersey
- Syracuse University Art Collection, Syracuse, NY
- Newark Public Library, Special Collections, Newark, NJ
- Arkansas State University Collection, Jonesboro, AR
- The Douro Museum Printmaking Collection, Peso da Régua, Portugal
- Print Club of Albany, Albany, NY

== Awards ==
- Marquis Who's Who in American Art References Award, 2013
- The American Women Artists Exhibition Award of Excellence, 2016
- The Jane Peterson Memorial Award, 2018
- Audubon Artists Silver Medal of Honor, 2019
- Gold Medal of Honor-The Catherine Lorillard Wolfe Art Club 123rd annual Juried Exhibition, The National Arts Club, NYC, 2020
- Best in Show, the Anna Hyatt Huntington Horse's Head Award for two-dimensional work, 2021
- The Salmagundi Club Award for Graphics, 2022
- Distinguished Achievement Award, AWA's Breaking Through: The Rise of American Women Artists, Customs House Museum Exhibition, Clarksville, TN, 2022
- The Ernest D. Roth Memorial Etching Award, 2023
- Jacob Landau Memorial Award for Printmaking, 2023
