= Kerr Eby =

Canadian artist (1889–1946)

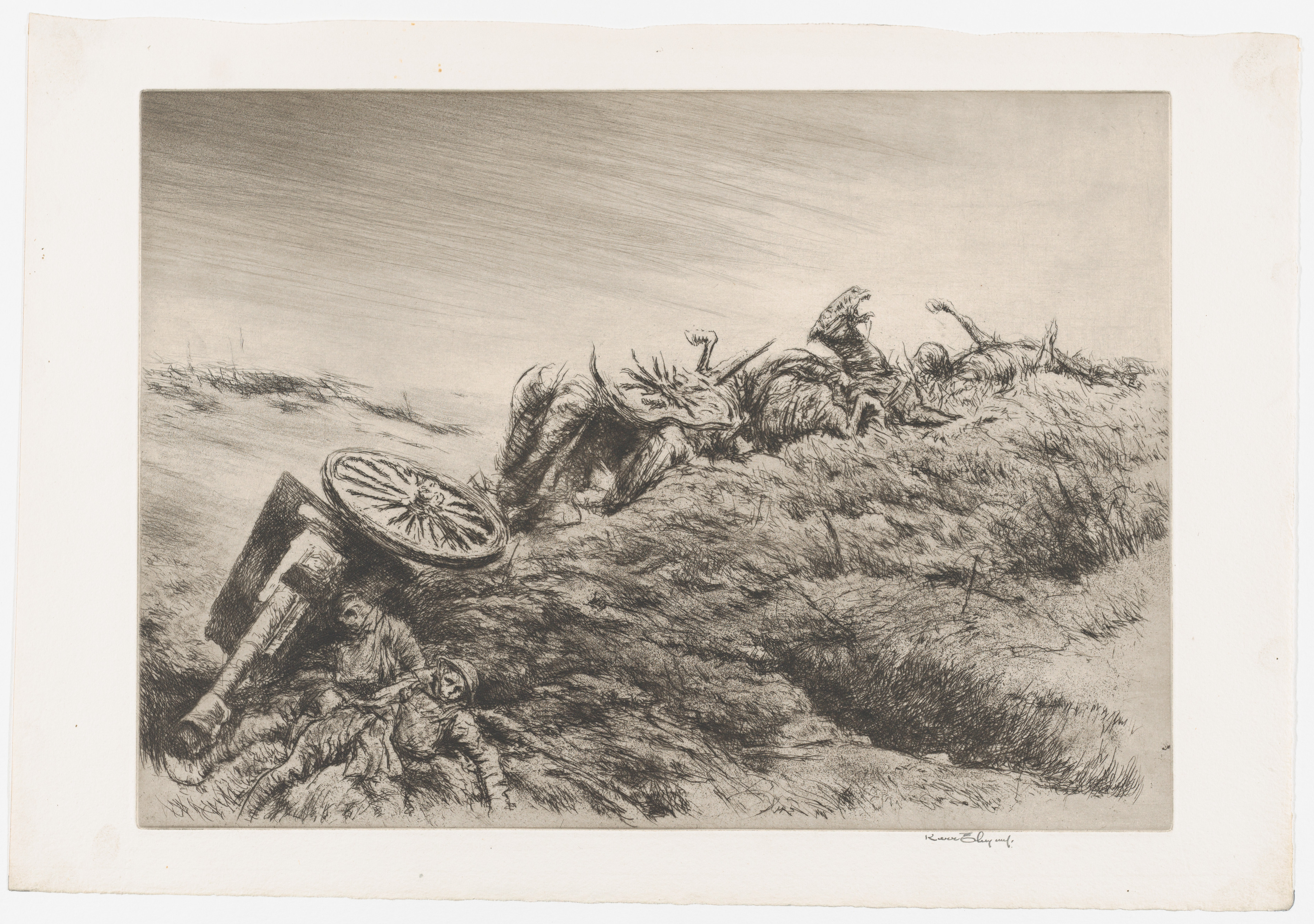
They Hunt No More

Kerr Eby (19 October 1889 – 18 November 1946) was a Canadian illustrator best known for his renderings of soldiers in combat in the First and Second World Wars. He is held in a similar regard to Harvey Dunn and the other famous illustrators dispatched by the government to cover the First World War.

== Early life and education ==
Born in Tokyo, Japan to Canadian Methodist missionary parents in 1889, Eby received formal art training at Pratt Institute and the Art Students League of New York.

== Career ==
Enlisting in the Army in 1917, Eby served in an ambulance crew and later as a camoufleur. Although unable to acquire an artist's commission to cover the war, he created many more images of soldiers both in combat and living their daily lives on the front.

In the 1920s and 1930s, Eby continued to occasionally generate pieces related to his experience, and worked many of his early sketches into completed lithographs. These images were eventually collected and distributed in the book WAR, which remains in the collection of many libraries today. Notable images in this collection include a haunting drawing of marines retreating across the countryside beneath a menacing black cloud. In 1930, he was elected into the National Academy of Design as an Associate member, and became a full Academician in 1934. He was also a member of the Society of American Graphic Artists. His work was part of the painting event in the art competition at the 1932 Summer Olympics.

As the United States returned to war in 1941, Eby attempted to reenlist but was denied because of his age. He found service instead in the combat artists program created by Abbott Laboratories to cover the war. He operated primarily in the Pacific during World War II, where he landed with the Marines on Tarawa and Guadalcanal. He created many of his strongest works, and put his life on the line to capture the experiences he shared with those soldiers.

Eby contracted a tropical disease while covering the war in Bougainville, and would die at his home in Westport, Connecticut in 1946. He left behind a great body of completed work and much that was still in progress. These drawings, prints, and paintings serve as both historical record and primary documentation of the American experience of war in the 20th century.

== Collections ==
Eby's work is held in the permanent collections of many museums throughout the United States, including the Smithsonian American Art Museum, the Detroit Institute of Arts, the Whitney Museum of American Art, the Smart Museum of Art, the Crystal Bridges Museum of American Art, the Worcester Art Museum, the Farnsworth Art Museum, the Nelson-Atkins Museum of Art, the University of Michigan Museum of Art, the Hood Museum of Art, the Philadelphia Museum of Art, the Delaware Art Museum, and the Williams College Museum of Art.

== Sample works ==
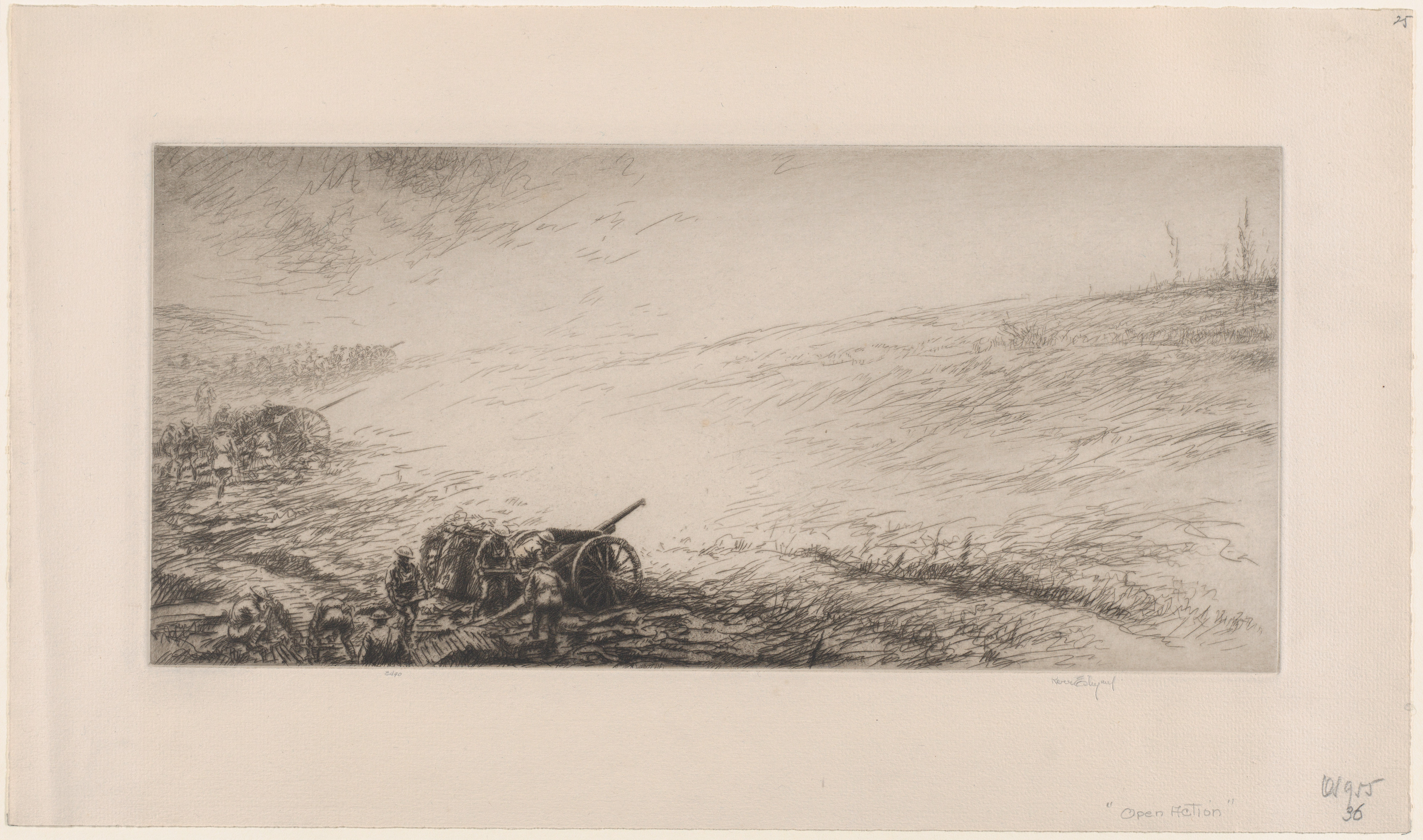
Open Etching (1928)

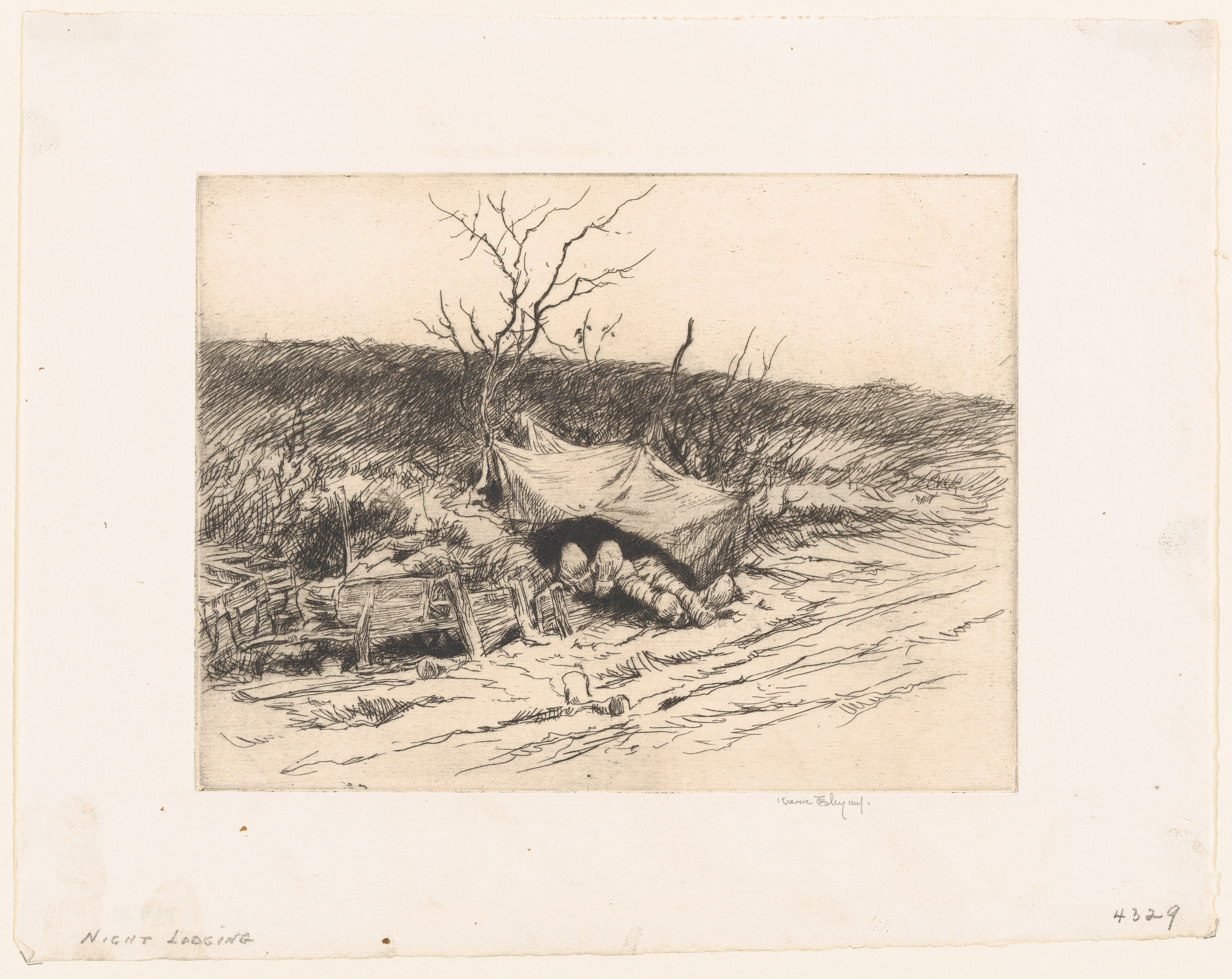
Lodging for the Night (1921–22)

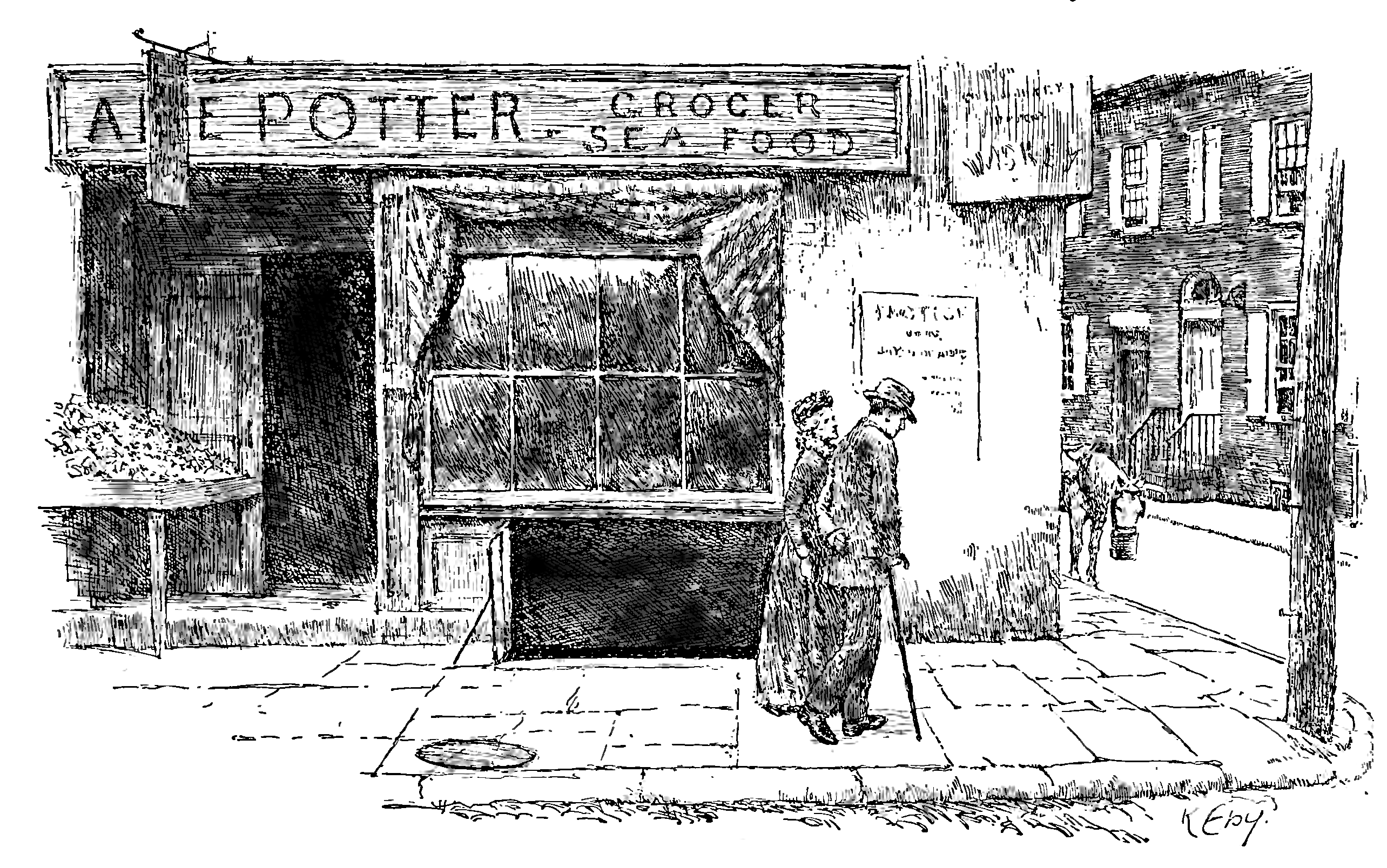
Untitled (1915), from Scribner's Magazine
