= Grace Albee =

American printmaker and wood engraver

- Grace Albee, 1932 Aug.
- Born: Grace Thurston Arnold; July 28, 1890; North Scituate, Rhode Island
- Died: July 26, 1985 (aged 94); Bristol, Rhode Island
- Education: Institut d'Esthétique Contemporaine, Paris, 1928–29; Rhode Island School of Design, Providence, Rhode Island, 1910–12
- Known for: Printmaking
- Spouse: Percy Albee
- Awards: 3rd prize, 1942 Artists for Victory exhibition

Grace Thurston Arnold Albee (July 28, 1890 – July 26, 1985) was an American printmaker and wood engraver. During her sixty-year career life, she created more than two hundred and fifty prints from linocuts, woodcuts, and wood engravings. She received over fifty awards and has her works in thirty-three museum collections. She was the first female graphic artist to receive full membership to the National Academy of Design.

== Early life ==
Albee was born in Scituate, Rhode Island to Henry Cranston Arnold and Susanne Arabella Thurston. Despite her father's resistance towards her artistic creativity, Albee was awarded two Saturday Scholarships to the Rhode Island School of Design (RISD) during her high school education at Providence, Rhode Island between 1906 and 1907. She entered the Rhode Island School of Design in 1910 and graduated in 1912. At RISD, Albee enrolled in the Department of Freehand Drawing and Painting, where she was recognized for her artistic achievements. Additionally, Albee learned the basics of woodcutting that would later lead to her artwork in printmaking. She married muralist Percy F. Albee on May 10, 1913, and gave birth to five sons over a period of nine years. Despite her role as a mother, Albee successfully balanced her time between her art and her domestic affairs.

Albee began making relief prints in 1915 when she and Percy created a staged puppet show called “Percy F. Albee Marionettes.” Albee crafted posters made from large linoleum in order to promote the show, which toured for the next eight years around Providence before permanently setting down in their house on Benefit Street. These earlier prints depicted the show's marionettes during performance.

From 1915 to 1919, Albee entered a short four-year hiatus from art to focus on motherhood.

== Shift to Lithography (Linocuts)- 1920s ==
In 1919 Albee returned to art and created one of her earliest linocuts “The Bath” (1919) and “In the Studio, Percy Albee” (1922). Additionally, the print “A Kitchen Window” was created as well. Besides large-scale prints, Albee also used linocuts to craft Christmas cards titled “Greetings from 102 George Street” (1921.)

In the 1920s, Albee's husband began focusing on arts involving linocuts, during which Albee was allowed to further experiment in her own lithography. Because of her husband's interest, Albee was able to showcase her work in block-printing without seemingly interfering with her husband's own artist career. In 1923 Albee submitted her works “In the Studio,” “The Bath”, and “A Kitchen Window” to the Providence Art Club's Nineteenth Annual Exhibition of Little Pictures (All of her works were on sale for ten dollars.) Additionally, Albee and her husband experimented in printing colored linoleum blocks on silk, which gained them recognition from the Providence Journal in 1926. The collaborated works consisted of multi-colored, tapestry-like hangings that measured several feet in height and length. The technique required from Albee's husband a year of practice so the color from the ink would not flake, fade, smear, or bleed into the silk. These works included a displayed image of “Grand Turk” (the American privateer from the War of 1812), a large map depicting the battle of Rhode Island in 1778, and a tapestry titled “Perch”. All the designs were cut by Albee herself. The tapestries were exhibited at the Providence Art Club in 1927 under Grace Albee's name (not Percy Albee.).

In 1927 Albee was recognized by the Providence Art Club for her twelve linocuts. She was praised for her expert technique and her handling in relief cutting. Eleven of these linocuts showcased the landscape and fishing industry of Rockport, Massachusetts. The twelfth print was a portrait of her husband Percy Albee.

In March 1928 Albee left for Paris, France with her family, printing before she left “Old Providence” and “To Each His Own.” While abroad, Albee further developed her interest in depicting urban and rural landscapes in her engravings. From 1928 to 1929 Albee studied at the Institut d'Esthétique Contemporaine. During her five years in Paris Albee created and exhibited her works at several Paris Salons, where they were met with positive reviews. In 1932 Albee held her first one-woman exhibition at the American Library in Paris, exhibiting her works by themselves rather than next to her husband's as she had done in the U.S. While in France, Albee associated with fellow expatriate artists including Norman Rockwell and engraver Paul Bornet.

=== 1930s-40s ===
Albee and her family returned to the United States in the 1933 and lived in New York City where she continued to produce prints. Her prints during her time in New York depicted the city's architecture. Her linocut “Contrast-Rockefeller Center” (1934) depicted one of the city's Gothic churches placed dramatically in the foreground of the city's skyscrapers. In 1937, Albee and her family moved to Doylestown, Pennsylvania and her prints switched back to rural subjects, such as stone houses and farms. In 1946 she produced the linocut “The Boyer Place” which pictured the farm scape of Pennsylvania.

In 1937 Albee received first place for her print "Housing Problems" at the Fifteenth Annual Exhibition of American Prints at the Philadelphia Art Alliance. In 1942 Albee was elected into the National Academy of Design in New York City as an Associate member and made a full member in 1946. In 1976, eighty of Albee's works were displayed in the Brooklyn Museum. Albee was also a member of the Society of American Graphic Artists.

=== 1960s - Death ===
The Albee's lived in Pennsylvania until 1962, after which they lived in Kew Gardens, New York (1962–1974) and then in Barrington, Rhode Island (1974–1985). Albee continued to work on prints well into her 90s. She died in 1985 at the age 94 at Bristol, Rhode Island.

== Museums Displaying Albee ==
Albee works are represented in a number of public collections in the United States, including the Metropolitan Museum of Art in New York. In 1976, eighty of her works were displayed in a retrospective exhibition in the Brooklyn Museum. The Library of Congress has 23 of her prints in its collection. Her works are also housed the Smithsonian Institution, in the Rosenwald Collection in the National Gallery of Art in Washington, D.C., in the Permanent Collection of the National Museum of Women in the Arts, the Georgia Museum of Art, the Cleveland Museum of Art, and the Boston Public Library.
