= Clare Romano =

American printmaker and painter

Clare Romano (1922–2017) was an internationally known American printmaker and painter with works in the Metropolitan Museum of Art, the Museum of Modern Art, the Smithsonian American Art Museum, the Cooper Hewitt, Smithsonian Design Museum and other major collections. As an advocate, innovator, and educator in the field of printmaking, Romano has co-authored in collaboration with her husband, John Ross, The Complete Printmaker (1972), The Complete Collagraph (1980), and several other printmaking manuals that have become standard texts for universities. They founded their High Tide Press for artists books in 1991.

== Biography ==
Romano earned her bachelor of fine arts degree in painting at Cooper Union School of Art in New York City from 1939 to 1943. She credits peers in her painting, drawing, and two-dimensional design classes, Morris Kantor, Sidney Delevante, and Carol Harrison, with having the greatest influence on her path of artistic endeavors career. After graduation, Romano worked for Herbert Bayer as his personal assistant to his private studio in New York City. Here Romano painted the covers for pharmaceutical brochures and managed the finished artwork for Fortune magazine, Container Corporation illustrations, and advertisements. Romano took six months leave to join her husband John Ross at an army training base in Louisiana after just one year of working for Bayer. Then returned to New York City by request of Bayer when Ross' unit was sent overseas to Italy in February 1945. Romano was given a higher position upon her return by becoming a staff artist for fashion and perfume accounts.

Upon John Ross' cultural exposure of Italian country and art, in 1949 Ross was able to utilize his GI Bill to return with Romano in order for both artists to partake in studying in Fontainebleau, France for two months. Continuing their stay, they then traveled throughout Europe for the following seven months. Their influence and admirability of Italy continued later in their lives as they held printmaking workshops for the Pratt Institute in Venice summer program starting in 1988. Upon Ross and Romano's return to New York in 1950, Romano was invited to take lithography lessons at the Creative Lithography Workshop from Robert Blackburn, a high school friend of Ross. This medium was new to Romano as her educational sequence at Cooper Union did not include printmaking. Her talent within the medium was quickly notable as her first piece, Eglise de St. Martin (1950) won a purchase award from the Brooklyn Museum of Art. Romano continued her practice of printmaking throughout the next decade, teaching herself woodcut, etching, and collagraphy. She earned a Louis Comfort Tiffany grant for printmaking at the Instituto Statele d' Arte in Florence, Italy, the fall of 1958 through the summer of 1959.

Beginning in 1963 throughout 1973, Romano taught at numerous institutions printmaking through fine arts. She taught relief and intaglio printmaking courses at the New School, while she was also the associate professor of printmaking and teaching at the Pratt Graphic Art Center in Manhattan. Romano also taught at the Pratt Institute in Brooklyn where she began as an assistant professor in printmaking and rose to become associate professor, a chair of the Fine Art Department, and a recipient of Pratt's Distinguished Professor Award for 1978–79. Robert Newman, owner of The Old Print Shop, a Manhattan gallery that has represented Ms. Romano since the 1990s, described the artist as a "hard-core teacher, she wanted her students to be artist, to do their work, and be proud of their work."

Romano and Ross master their signature collagraph technique while visiting artists in Yugoslavia for the U.S. Information Agency in conjunction with "Graphic Arts USA," a traveling exhibition of American prints. There was no metal plates available for intaglio work in Eastern Europe. With this challenge, their solution was simultaneous intaglio and relief inking on a single cardboard matrix, their cardboard relief prints had been a continual exploration since the mid-1950s. Shoreline is a woodcut print that sufficiently represents Romano's printmaking work as she transitioned into being a notable printmaker. This color woodcut, collage, and cardboard relief is a representation of a familiar landscape view of the eastern seaboard. The piece also captures architectural forms in space. Romano's process was one of inspired layering and transitions within the piece, provoked by the landscape around her. She neglected to begin works with templates and preconceived drawings. Shoreline showcases the artist's accomplishment in variation of color and surface treatments from a single pass of a plate through a press. This work would have been printed in sequenced registration with multiple woodblocks and cardboard plates. Throughout Romano's printmaking processes, her proven desire to depict images of dimension and depth of color that preserves an abstracted simplicity creates intricate designed pieces of work.

== Principal works ==
- 1922 - New York Byzantine, Metropolitan Museum
- 1950 - Eglise de St. Martin, Brooklyn Museum
- 1958 - Shoreline, New York City
- 1966 - Walls of Dubrovnik, Smithsonian
- 1971 - On the Grass, Museum of Modern Art
- 1975 - Grand Canyon
- 1997 - Low Tide, Metropolitan Museum
- N.d. - Eternal City II, Smithsonian
