= Hideo Hagiwara =

Japanese artist (1913–2007)

- 萩原 英雄
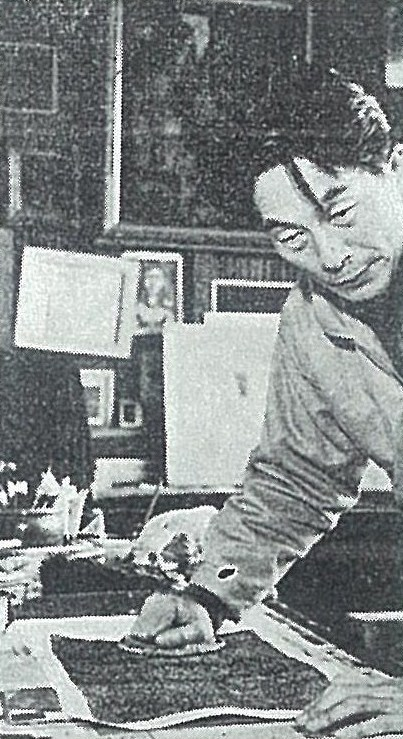
- Born: 1913; Kofu, Yamanashi Prefecture, Japan
- Died: November 4, 2007 (aged 93–94)
- Other name: Hagiwara Hideo
- Occupations: Artist, printmaker

Hideo Hagiwara (萩原 英雄, Hagiwara Hideo; 1913 – November 4, 2007) was a Japanese artist who worked mainly with woodblock prints. He was described as "Japan's leading contemporary printmaker" in The Philadelphia Inquirer in 1967.

== Biography ==
Hagiwara was born in Kōfu, Yamanashi, and raised in Korea and Manchuria in the 1920s. His father was a Japanese government official. He studied at the Tokyo School of Fine Arts, where he graduated from the oil painting program in 1938. While still there he attended Un'ichi Hiratsuka's extracurricular woodblock printing course, and in the same year he became quality controller at the Takamizawa Woodblock Print Company.

Hagiwara was conscripted into the army in 1943. In 1945 he had lost his house, his atelier and nearly all his early works, and was confined to bed with tuberculosis. Around 1950 he had sufficiently recovered to start painting again. He started making Sōsaku Hanga, both figurative and abstract prints. He was known as a constant innovator and he was generally considered one of the best post-World War II Sōsaku Hanga artists. He was a member of Nihon Hanga Kyonkai and exhibited in the 1950s and 1960s, in Japan and abroad, and won several prizes for his work, including the grand prize at the Ljubljana International Exposition of Prints in 1967.

Hagiwara toured and taught in the United States in 1967. He died in 2007, in his nineties.
