= Society of American Graphic Artists =

Organization

- Formation: 1915
- Purpose: Artist-run membership organization promoting a greater appreciation of fine prints among collectors and the general public
- Location: 32 Union Sq E, Suite 1214, New York, NY 10003
- Website: sagaprints.com
- Formerly called: Brooklyn Society of Etchers, Society of American Etchers, Inc

The Society of American Graphic Artists (SAGA) is a not for profit national fine arts organization serving professional artists in the field of printmaking. SAGA provides its members with exhibition, reviews and networking opportunities in the New York City area and, in addition to various substantial exhibition prizes, many purchase awards allow SAGA members to be included in major U.S. museum collections.

The origins of the organization date back to 1915 with the formation of the Brooklyn Society of Etchers. After several name changes, including Society of American Etchers, the present title was adopted in 1952 to allow for the inclusion of a full range of hand pulled printmaking techniques. Over the course of its close to 100 years of continuous operation, many important national and international modern artists have exhibited with SAGA, including Henri Matisse, Käthe Kollwitz, John Sloan, Edward Hopper, Pablo Picasso, Mary Cassatt, Joseph Pennell, John Marin, Childe Hassam, Will Barnet and John Taylor Arms. SAGA continues to attract a diverse group of contemporary printmakers who serve as important contributors to and ambassadors of printmaking in the United States. SAGA also maintains a collector print collection of member work and publishes a periodical journal of writing on printmaking-related topics, SAGAzine. SAGA's current offices are at the former New York studio of John Sloan.

== History ==
SAGA has been active since its inception in 1915 under the name of the Brooklyn Society of Etchers, and has organized over 79 National Member Exhibitions, in addition to various international, traveling and exchange exhibitions.

In relation to other artists’ associations of the time, SAGA was modeled more closely to the French impressionist group (Cooperative Society of Painters, Sculptors, Engravers, etc.) which was focused on organizing exhibitions for its members, rather than other printmaking organizations such as the British Etching Club or the French Society of Etchers (Societe des Aquafortistes) which were highly selective and secretive with very few members or focused more on commercial promotions, respectively.

With the advent of artists’ societies and clubs in the United States in the latter part of the 19th century, the New York Etching Club founded in 1877 gave way to establishment of the Brooklyn Society of Etchers which was organized 22 years after its disbandment. Founding members included Troy Kinney, Eugene Higgins, Susan A. Hutchinson, Fred Reynolds, M. Paul Roche, and Ernest Roth. Approximately 200 etchings by 65 artists including John Taylor Arms, Frank W. Benson, Mary Cassatt, Childe Hassam, John Marin, and Mahonri Young were exhibited at the Brooklyn Museum as part of the organization's inaugural exhibition.

The organization continued to grow aggressively during the first fifteen years of its existence with both the membership and number of prints exhibited at the annual exhibitions tripling. The first international exhibition was organized at the Anderson Galleries in New York in 1922, including works by several major European and American artists such as Mary Cassatt, Ernest Haskell, Childe Hassam, Edward Hopper, Wilhelm Lembrook, Henri Matisse, Pablo Picasso, Camille Pissarro, and John Sloan.

The organization decided to rename to the Society of American Etchers, Inc. since membership had grown to include many other geographic areas beyond Brooklyn, and the exhibitions were moved from the Brooklyn Museum to the National Arts Club in New York. Membership grew to include important printmakers of the 1930s including Isabelle Bishop, Mina Citron, Kenneth Hayes, Stanley William Hayter, John Sloan and Reginald Marsh. During this time, exhibit exchanges with European print clubs were organized.

In 1947, the society organized the largest show in its history, a collection of over 650 prints at the National Academy. Since many of these prints utilized techniques such as woodcut, wood engraving, and lithography, the organization was renamed to the Society of American Etchers, Gravers, Lithographers, and Woodcutters, Inc. and then again to its current designation the Society of American Graphic Artists (SAGA) in 1952.

With the ever changing climate of visual arts, printmaking has also undergone changes from the birth of non-objectivity, to surrealism, abstraction and beyond. A study of the catalogues of SAGA's exhibitions reflects these changes but it also shows SAGA's openness to all styles. In this respect the society has always followed the precept of its longtime president from 1931 to 1952, John Taylor Arms, who felt that SAGA should represent all techniques and styles in order to represent a true cross section of contemporary printmaking.

== Notable past and present members ==
Since its inception, SAGA has had many renowned professional artists as members and exhibitors.

- Grace A. Albee
- James E. Allen
- Irving Amen
- Clarence William Anderson
- John Taylor Arms *
- William Auerbach-Levy
- Peggy Bacon
- Will Barnet
- Martin Barooshian *
- Lionel Barrymore
- Leonard Baskin
- Gustave Baumann
- William Behnken *
- Isabel Bishop
- Robert Blackburn
- Paul Cadmus
- Letterio Calapai
- Jean Charlot
- Minna Citron
- Howard Cook
- Stuart Davis
- Adolf Dehn
- Dorothy Dehner
- Mabel Dwight
- Kerr Eby
- Fritz Eichenberg
- Ralph Fabri
- Antonio Frasconi
- Wanda Hazel Gag
- Jan Gelb
- Jolán Gross-Bettelheim
- Lena Gurr
- George O. "Pop" Hart *
- Childe Hassam
- Kenneth Hayes
- Stanley William Hayter
- Edward Hopper
- Robert Kipniss
- Käthe Kollwitz
- Chaim Koppelman *
- Armin Landeck
- Robert Lawson
- Gerson Leiber *
- Clare Leighton
- Martin Levine *
- Martin Lewis
- John Marin
- Anne Steele Marsh *
- Reginald Marsh
- John A. Noble
- Joseph Pennell
- DeAnn L. Prosia *
- Camille Pissarro
- Clare Romano *
- John Ross *
- Birger Sandzén
- Raphael Soyer
- John Sloan
- Prentiss Taylor
- Lynd Ward *
- Frederick T. Weber *
- Stow Wengenroth

* Past president
