= Margaret Lowengrund =

American artist

Margaret Lowengrund (b. 1902 Philadelphia, Pennsylvania; d. 1957 New York) was an American artist and a key figure in the American Print Renaissance of the 1950s and 1960s. Lowengrund attended at the Pennsylvania Academy of the Fine Arts and also studied with Joseph Pennell in New York. She founded the pioneering the Contemporaries Graphic Art Centre in 1955, originally the Contemporaries gallery founded in 1952 and which later became the Pratt Graphic Art Center upon her death. She is known for her etchings, lithographs, and paintings and was a Works Progress Administration (WPA) artist.

Lowengrund's work is in the permanent collection of the Delaware Art Museum, the Metropolitan Museum of Art, the National Gallery of Art, The Newark Museum of Art the Spencer Museum of Art, the Library of Congress, and the San Francisco Museum of Modern Art. Her work was included in the Office of Emergency Management Art in War exhibit at the Museum of Modern Art in 1942.

== Gallery ==
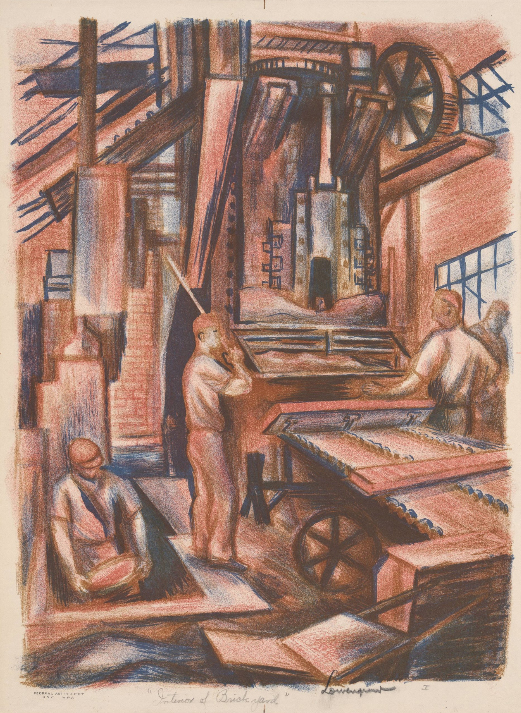
Interior of Brickyard, ca. 1935

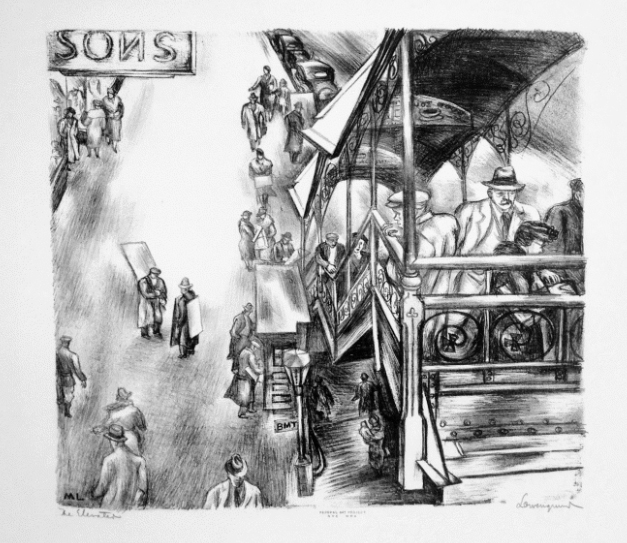
The Elevated, ca.1936
