= Michael Ponce de Leon =

American painter

- Born: July 4, 1922; Miami, Florida
- Died: January 23, 2006; Mexico
- Known for: Painting, printmaking

Michael Ponce de Leon (1922-2006) was an American printmaker and painter.

== Biography ==
Ponce de Leon was born on July 4, 1922, in Miami, Florida. His early life and education was in Mexico City. There he studied at Universidad Nacional Autónoma de México and the University of Mexico City. During World War II he served in the United States Army Air Forces. After the war he located in New York City where he studied at the Art Students League of New York, the National Academy of Design, and the School of the Brooklyn Museum.

In 1966 he had a solo exhibition at the Corcoran Gallery of Art in Washington, D.C. In 1967 Ponce de Leon received a of Guggenheim Fellowships

Ponce de Leon taught at a variety of colleges and universities from 1953 through 1980 including the Art Students League, Columbia University, Cooper Union, Hunter College, New York University, Pratt Institute, the Pratt Graphic Art Center, and Vassar College. His prints and paintings are in the collections of the Art Institute of Chicago, the Museum of Modern Art, the National Gallery of Art, the Smithsonian American Art Museum, and the Walker Art Center.

Ponce de Leon died in Mexico on January 23, 2006.
