= John Taylor Arms =

American etcher

- Born: April 19, 1887; Washington, D.C.
- Died: October 15, 1953 (aged 66); Fairfield, Connecticut
- Known for: printmaker, etcher

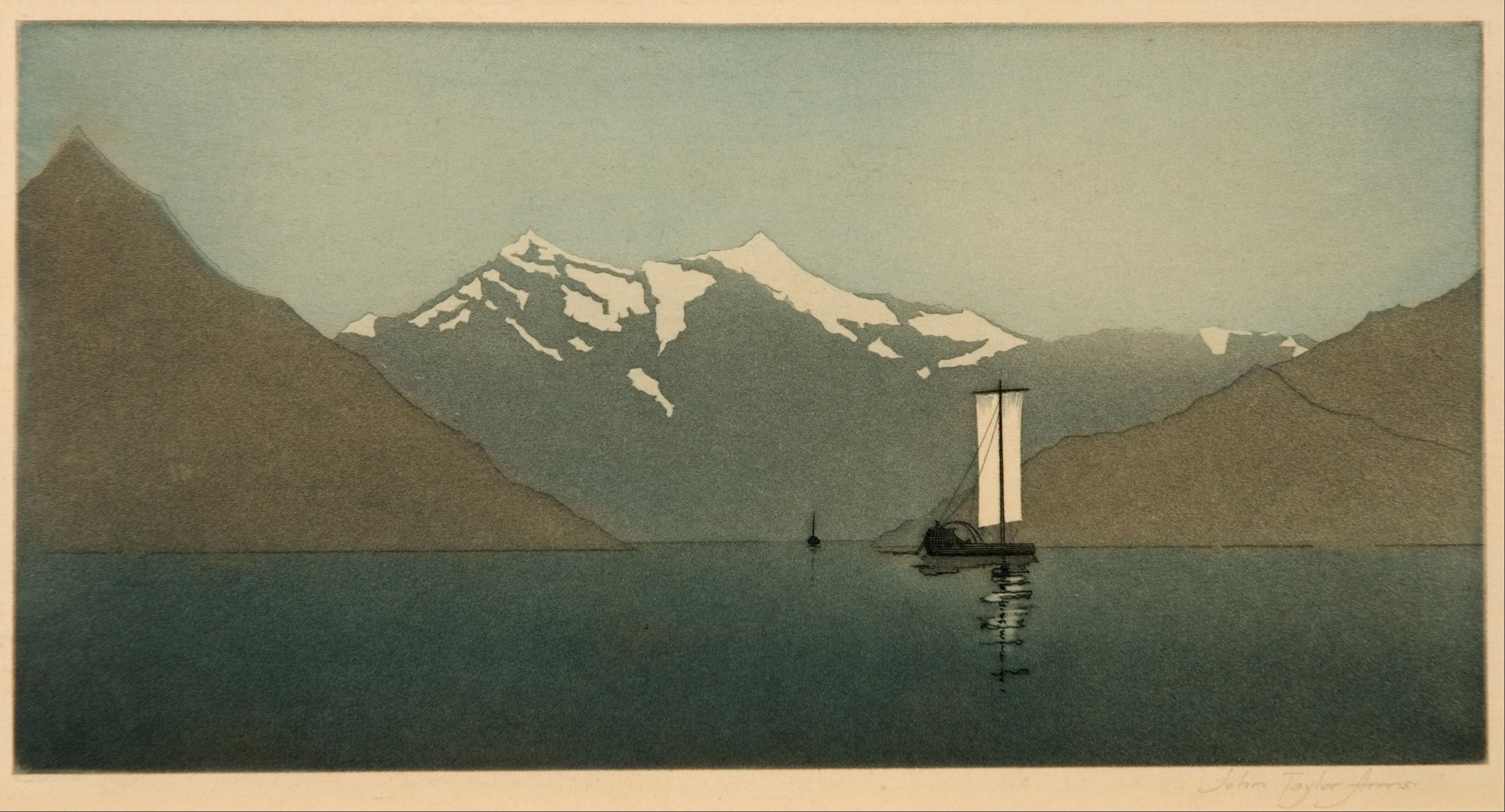
On Lake Como, Number Two, 1919, color etching and aquatint

John Taylor Arms (April 19, 1887 – October 13, 1953) was an American etcher.

== Life ==
Arms was born in Washington, DC in 1887. He studied law at Princeton University, transferring to the Massachusetts Institute of Technology, Boston, to study architecture, graduating in 1912. After serving as an officer in the United States Navy during World War I, he devoted himself full-time to etching. He published his first original etchings in 1919.

His initial subject was the Brooklyn Bridge in New York City near which he worked. Arms developed a successful career as a graphic artist in the 1920s and 1930s, specializing in series of etchings of Gothic churches and cathedrals in France and Italy. In addition to medieval subjects, Arms made a series of prints of American cities.

He used sewing needles and magnifying glasses to get a fine level of detail. A member of many printmaking societies, Arms served as president of the Society of American Graphic Artists. An educator, Arms wrote the Handbook of Print Making and Print Makers (1934) and did numerous demonstrations and lectures. Arms was elected into the National Academy of Design as an Associate member in 1930, and became a full member in 1933. His work was also part of the painting event in the art competition at the 1932 Summer Olympics.

Arms died in Fairfield, Connecticut in 1953.

In 2011, 54 of Arms’ prints and drawing were shown at the National Gallery of Art’s exhibit The Gothic Spirit of John Taylor Arms; the works were drawn from the Gallery’s collection.
