= Albany Municipal Airport =

Albany Municipal Airport may refer to:

- Albany Municipal Airport (Missouri) in Albany, Missouri, United States (FAA: K19)
- Albany Municipal Airport (Oregon) in Albany, Oregon, United States (FAA: S12)
- Albany Municipal Airport (Texas) in Albany, Texas, United States (FAA: T23)

== See also ==
- Albany Airport (disambiguation)
