= North Arlington =

North Arlington is the name of two places in the United States:

- North Arlington, New Jersey.
  - North Arlington School District
    - North Arlington High School
- North Arlington, Virginia, an unincorporated community in Arlington County, Virginia
