= Derrell Palmer =

American football player (1922–2009)

- Palmer during his Browns career

No. 40, 42, 72
- Position: Tackle

Personal information
- Born: August 27, 1922; Breckenridge, Texas, U.S.
- Died: February 22, 2009 (aged 86); Cleburne, Texas, U.S.
- Listed height: 6 ft 2 in (1.88 m)
- Listed weight: 240 lb (109 kg)

Career information
- High school: Albany (TX)
- College: TCU (1939–1942)
- NFL draft: 1943: 6th round, 49th overall pick

Career history
- New York Yankees (1946–1948); Cleveland Browns (1949–1953)

Awards and highlights
- NFL champion (1950); AAFC champion (1949); First-team All-American (1942); 2× First-team All-SWC (1941, 1942); TCU Hall of Fame (1978)

Career NFL/AAFC statistics
- Games played: 96
- Games started: 57
- Fumble recoveries: 2
- Stats at Pro Football Reference

Derrell Palmer (August 27, 1922 – February 22, 2009) was an American professional football tackle who played eight seasons in the All-America Football Conference (AAFC) and in the National Football League (NFL), mainly with the Cleveland Browns.

Palmer grew up in Texas and played college football at Texas Christian University, where he became the defensive captain and was named an All-American in 1943. After three years in the U.S. Marines, Palmer began his professional career with the New York Yankees in the AAFC. The Yankees won their division in 1946 and 1947, but lost in the AAFC championship game both years to the Browns. Palmer was traded to the Browns before the 1949 season and remained with the team through 1953. Cleveland won the AAFC championship in 1949 and the NFL championship in 1950. After retiring in 1953, Palmer moved back to Texas and worked for Sherwin-Williams for 32 years. He was inducted into TCU's hall of fame in 1978. He died in 2009.

== Early life and college ==
Palmer grew up in Breckenridge, Texas and played football, baseball and was on the track and field team at Albany High School near his hometown. He suffered a hip injury in high school, and doctors told him he would never play football again. Palmer, however, graduated and enrolled at Texas Christian University in Fort Worth, Texas, where he played college football for the TCU Horned Frogs.

Palmer played for TCU as a tackle starting in 1940, his sophomore year. The team finished with a 3–7 win–loss record under head coach Dutch Meyer in his first year. In 1941, however, the team improved to a 7–3–1 win–loss–tie record and met the University of Georgia Bulldogs in the Orange Bowl. Palmer, by then a junior and the defensive captain, played well in the game, but TCU lost 40–26 to a Georgia team led by quarterback Frank Sinkwich. Palmer continued to be a leader for TCU in 1942 and was named an All-American by sportswriters. The team finished with a 7–3 record.

The Chicago Bears of the National Football League (NFL) selected Palmer in the sixth round of the 1943 draft, but he decided to put off his professional career to serve in the U.S. Marines during World War II. He went to Officer Candidates School and graduated as a second lieutenant. He then served in the Pacific War and spent two and a half years as a military policeman at Pearl Harbor in Hawaii. He played for his base's football team.

== Professional career ==
After his discharge from the Marines in 1946, Palmer signed a $4,500-a-year contract to play for the New York Yankees of the All-America Football Conference in the league's first year of play. He played in 13 games in his first year with the Yankees and became a regular starter at left tackle in 1947 and 1948. The team won the AAFC's Eastern Division in 1946 and 1947 and advanced to the AAFC Championship, but lost to the Cleveland Browns in both seasons. With the Yankees, Palmer was part of a potent offense that featured Sinkwich and star halfback Spec Sanders, who in 1947 had 3,631 running, passing and kick return yards and 19 touchdowns.

Palmer, who played as a tackle on both offense and defense, saw his playing time reduced in 1948 after head coach Ray Flaherty was replaced four games into the season by Red Strader. The team finished with a 6–8 record, and Palmer was traded after the season to the Browns in exchange for the draft rights to center Alex Sarkisian. In Cleveland, Palmer played mainly on defense, but substituted occasionally for the team's regular offensive tackles, Lou Groza and Lou Rymkus. The Browns beat the San Francisco 49ers to win the AAFC championship in 1949, but the league dissolved after the season and the Browns, along with the 49ers and Baltimore Colts, were absorbed by the NFL.

The Browns continued to win in the NFL, beating the Los Angeles Rams for the championship in 1950. Led by head coach Paul Brown and an offense that featured quarterback Otto Graham, fullback Marion Motley and ends Dante Lavelli and Mac Speedie, the Browns won the NFL East Division each year from 1951 to 1953 but lost the NFL Championship Game each of those seasons. After Rymkus retired in 1951, Palmer saw increased playing time on offense as he shared tackle duties with John Sandusky. He retired after the 1953 season. Brown called him one of the two best defensive tackles he ever coached.

== Later life and death ==
After leaving football, Palmer and his wife Barbara moved back to Texas. Palmer opened the first Sherwin-Williams paint store in Cleburne, Texas and worked for the company for 32 years. He also served on the Cleburne city council, was president of the local Lion's Club and worked for a variety of other civic groups and projects. Palmer was inducted into TCU's hall of fame in 1978 and retired from business in 1985. He died in Cleburne in 2009. Palmer and his wife had two children. His son Scott played on a University of Texas football team that won the national championship in 1969, and had a two-year career as a tackle in the NFL.
