= Jim Montgomery (American football) =

American football player (1922–1992)

Profile
- Position: Tackle

Personal information
- Born: March 18, 1922; Breckenridge, Texas
- Died: August 4, 1992 (aged 70); Dallas
- Listed height: 6 ft 4 in (1.93 m)
- Listed weight: 235 lb (107 kg)

Career information
- High school: Moran (TX)
- College: Texas A&M

Career history
- Detroit Lions (1946)

Career statistics
- Games: 11
- Stats at Pro Football Reference

James Brown Montgomery Jr. (March 18, 1922 – August 14, 1992) was an American football player.

Montgomery was born in Breckenridge, Texas. He attended Moran High School in Texas and played college football for Texas A&M. He served in the U.S. Army as a field artillery instructor during World War II. In January 1946, shortly before his discharge from the Army, Montgomery signed with the Detroit Lions of the National Football League (NFL). He appeared in 11 NFL games as at tackle during the 1946 season.

His son Ross Montgomery played for the Chicago Bears in 1969 and 1970.

After his playing career ended, Montgomery worked for Exxon for 35 years. He was Exxon's West Texas marketing manager when he retired in 1982. After retiring from Exxon, he returned to Moran, Texas, where he lived for the rest of his life. He died in 1992 at his son's home in Dallas.
