= NAHS =

Nahs or NAHS may refer to:

- Naḥš, a hypothetical Proto-Canaanite originator of the Semitic letter Nun
- National Art Honor Society, an American high school honor society
- New American High Schools, an initiative of the United States Department of Education
- Sodium hydrosulfide (NaHS)

== Schools ==
- Nazareth Academy High School, Philadelphia, Pennsylvania, United States
- New Albany High School (disambiguation)
- North Adams High School, Seaman, Ohio, United States
- North Andover High School, North Andover, Massachusetts, United States
- North Arlington High School, North Arlington, New Jersey, United States
- North Atlanta High School, Atlanta, Georgia, United States
- North Augusta High School, North Augusta, South Carolina, United States
- Nurnberg American High School, a closed United States Department of Defense Dependents Schools (DoDDS) system school in Nurnberg, Germany
