= Albany Airport (disambiguation) =

Albany Airport, or Albany International Airport, is an airport in Albany, New York, US

Albany Airport may also refer to:

- Albany Airport (Australia) in Albany, Western Australia (IATA: ALH, ICAO YABA)
- Albany Municipal Airport (Oregon) in Albany, Oregon, United States (FAA: S12)
- Albany Municipal Airport (Missouri) in Albany, Missouri, United States (FAA: K19)
- Albany Municipal Airport (Texas) in Albany, Texas, United States (FAA: T23)
- Albany, Green county, Wisconsin (FAA : 54W)

Other airports in places named Albany:

- Southwest Georgia Regional Airport in Albany, Georgia, United States (FAA/IATA: ABY)
- Ohio University Airport-Snyder Field in Athens/Albany, Ohio, United States (FAA/IATA: UNI)
- New Albany-Union County Airport in New Albany, Mississippi, United States (FAA: M72)
