= Albany High School =

Albany High School may refer to:

== In the United Kingdom ==
- The former name of Albany Academy in Chorley, Lancashire, England

== In the United States ==
- Albany High School (California), Albany, California
- Albany High School (Georgia), Albany, Georgia
- Albany High School (Louisiana), Albany, Louisiana
- Albany High School (Minnesota), Albany, Minnesota
- Albany High School (New York), Albany, New York
- Albany Junior/Senior High School, Albany, Texas
- Albany High School (Wisconsin), Albany, Wisconsin
- Albany High School (Alaska), Anchorage, Alaska
- Albany Union High School, the former name of West Albany High School in Albany, Oregon, prior to the completion of South Albany High School in 1972

== See also ==
- Albany Junior/Senior High School
- Albany Senior High School (disambiguation)
- New Albany High School (disambiguation)
