= Shackelford County Courthouse Historic District =

United States historic district

- U.S. National Register of Historic Places
- U.S. Historic district
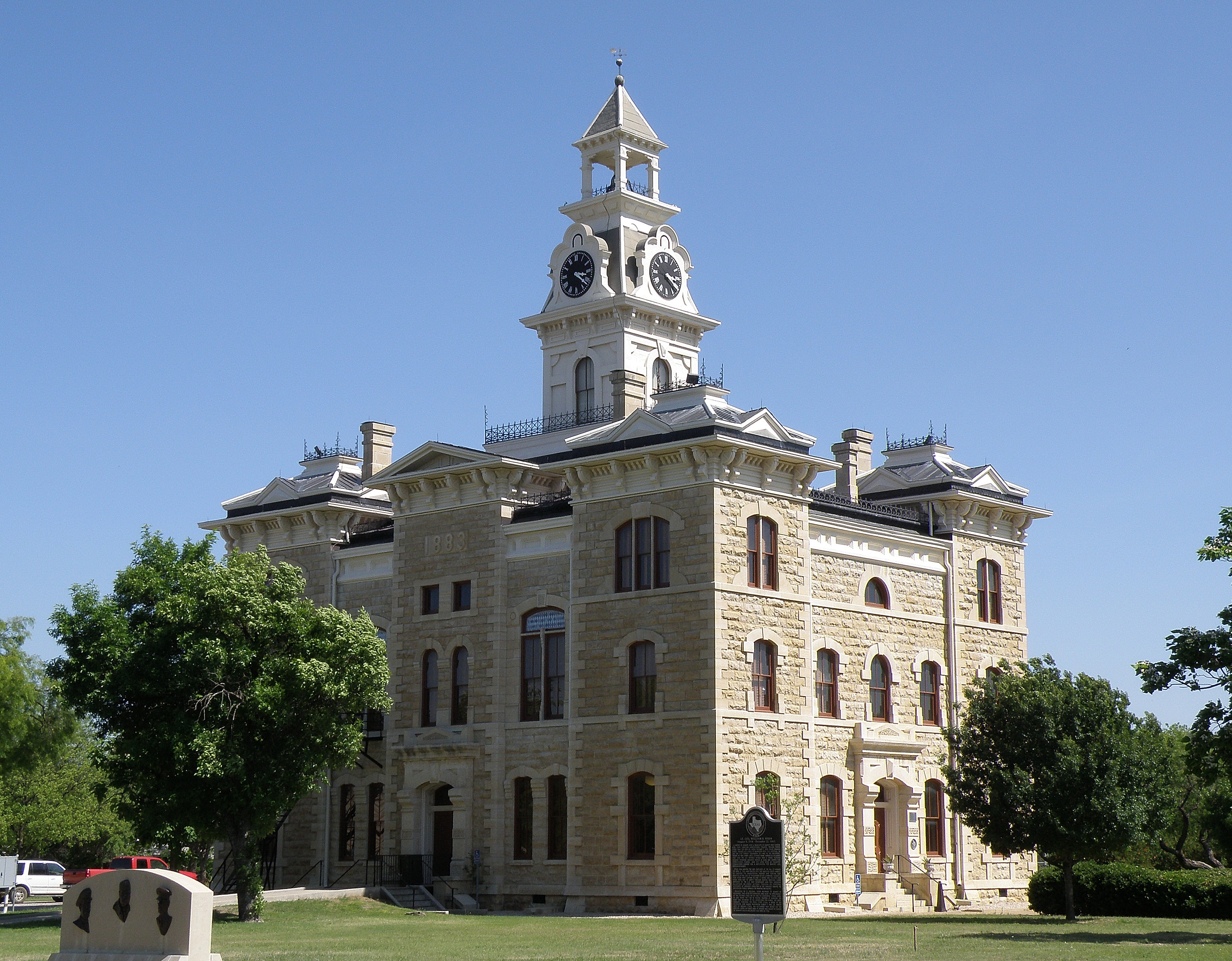
- Shackleford County Courthouse

- Location within Texas Location within the United States
- Location: Roughly bounded by S. 1st, S. 4th, S. Jacobs, and S. Pecan Sts., Albany, Texas
- Coordinates: 32°43′22″N 99°17′47″W
- Area: 17 acres (6.9 ha)
- Architect: Multiple
- Architectural style: Late Victorian
- NRHP reference No.: 76002065
- Added to NRHP: July 30, 1976

The Shackelford County Courthouse Historic District is a historic district in Albany, Texas. It is roughly bounded by South 1st, South 4th, South Jacobs, and South Pecan Streets, centered on the courthouse square. Added to the National Register of Historic Places in 1976, the district includes the Shackelford County Courthouse and a number of surrounding Victorian buildings dating from the late nineteenth and early twentieth centuries.

== History ==
Shackelford County was established in 1858, and its county seat was placed at Albany, Texas, in 1874. A wood-frame courthouse was raised in 1875, and a county jail (now the Old Jail Art Center) was built alongside it in 1878. Sixteen lots with 25-foot (7.6 m) frontages were platted on each side of the courthouse square, which became the center of the growing town. In 1881 Albany became a terminus of the Texas Central Railroad, after which people and businesses moved to the county seat from surrounding settlements.

Most of the structures built around the courthouse prior to the arrival of the railroad were wood-frame residences, but in the 1880s more commercial and civic structures went up around the square, the majority built of stone. A Presbyterian Church was raised in 1882. In 1883 one of the houses on the square was repurposed as Albany's first public school, and a two-story bank building raised that year later became City Hall. The first courthouse was torn down in 1883 and replaced by the current Shackelford County Courthouse in 1884. By the 1890s numerous shops, residences, and hotels had been erected on the lots around the square.

Since the early twentieth century, few alterations have been made to the structures in the courthouse district, with the youngest buildings dating to the 1920s. Individual buildings have been restored by their owners at various times, and business owners in the district have cooperated to encourage historic preservation. On July 30, 1976, the courthouse square and surrounding lots were added to the National Register of Historic Places as a historic district in recognition of the district's well-preserved Victorian frontier architecture. According to its nomination form, the district retains "the charm of the Northwest Texas Frontier".

== Historic properties ==
Historic properties within Shackelford County Courthouse Historic District
Shackelford County Courthouse (1883–1884); Recorded Texas Historic Landmark #4649, 1962; State Antiquities Landmark #560, 1981

Old Jail Art Center (1877–1878); Recorded Texas Historic Landmark #4650, 1962

Hartfield Building (1884–1885); Recorded Texas Historic Landmark #12365, 2000

== See also ==
- National Register of Historic Places listings in Shackelford County, Texas
