= Albany Senior High School =

Albany Senior High School may refer to one of two educational establishments:

- Albany Senior High School, Auckland
- Albany Senior High School, Western Australia

== See also ==
- Albany High School (disambiguation)
- Albany Junior/Senior High School, Albany, Texas
