= National Register of Historic Places listings in Shackelford County, Texas =

Location of Shackelford County in Texas

This is a list of the National Register of Historic Places listings in Shackelford County, Texas.

This is intended to be a complete list of properties and districts listed on the National Register of Historic Places in Shackelford County, Texas. There are one district and four individual properties listed on the National Register in the county. The district includes one State Antiquities Landmark and several Recorded Texas Historic Landmarks. Two other properties are also State Antiquities Landmarks including one Texas State Historic Site.

This National Park Service list is complete through NPS recent listings posted July 18, 2025.

== Current listings ==
The locations of National Register properties and districts may be seen in a mapping service provided.

	Name on the Register	Image	Date listed	Location	City or town	Description
1	Fort Griffin	Fort Griffin	March 11, 1971 (#71000962)	15 mi (24 km). N of Albany on U.S. 283; 32°55′35″N 99°13′55″W	Albany vicinity	Texas State Historic Site, State Antiquities Landmark
2	Fort Griffin Brazos River Bridge	Fort Griffin Brazos River Bridge	October 16, 1979 (#79003006)	NE of Fort Griffin; 32°56′05″N 99°13′26″W	Fort Griffin	State Antiquities Landmark
3	Hubbard Creek Bridge	Hubbard Creek Bridge	October 10, 1996 (#96001105)	FM 601, 7.5 mi (12.1 km). E of Jct with TX 6; 32°41′25″N 99°09′53″W	Albany vicinity	
4	Shackelford County Courthouse Historic District	Shackelford County Courthouse Historic District	July 30, 1976 (#76002065)	Roughly bounded by S. 1st, S. 4th, S. Jacobs, and S. Pecan Sts. 32°43′21″N 99°17′46″W	Albany	Contains State Antiquities Landmark and several Recorded Texas Historic Landmarks, including the Old Jail Art Center
5	State Highway 23 Bridge at the Clear Fork of the Brazos River	State Highway 23 Bridge at the Clear Fork of the Brazos River	October 10, 1996 (#96001106)	US 283, 2.3 mi (3.7 km). S of Throckmorton Cnty. Line; 32°55′58″N 99°12′54″W	Albany vicinity	

== See also ==
- National Register of Historic Places listings in Texas
- Recorded Texas Historic Landmarks in Shackelford County
