= Albany News =

Newspaper in Albany, Texas

- Founded: 1875
- Circulation: 849 (as of 2023)
- Website: www.thealbanynews.net

Albany News has been the local newspaper for Albany, Texas since 1875. The newspaper is published weekly.
