= Joseph Zadroga =

American 9/11 survivor advocate (1947–2024)

Joseph Charles Zadroga (April 2, 1947 – January 13, 2024) was an American advocate for first responders who fell sick with illnesses they believed came from their time in the rubble of the World Trade Center following the September 11 terrorist attacks. He was the father of James Zadroga, a New York City Police Department (NYPD) officer who died of a respiratory disease that has been attributed to his participation in rescue and recovery operations during and after the 9/11 attacks. Zadroga was the first NYPD officer whose death was attributed to exposure to his contact with toxic chemicals at the attack site.

Born in Newark, Zadroga was raised in North Arlington, New Jersey, and graduated from North Arlington High School. He attended William Paterson University and earned a master's degree from Fairleigh Dickinson University. He served a quarter century with the North Arlington Police Department, retiring in 1997 as its chief.

On January 13, 2024, Joseph Zadroga was killed after being run over by an SUV in a hospital parking lot in Pomona, New Jersey. He was 76.
