= Inline Skating Club of America =

Coordinates: 40.78324°N 74.12619°W

- Interactive map of Inline Skating Club of America
- Location: 170 Schuyler Ave, North Arlington, NJ 07031
- Operator: Inline Skating Club of America
- Surface: Sport Court

Tenants
- New Jersey Grizzlies; Wallington Grizzlies

The Inline Skating Club of America is a skating facility located in North Arlington, New Jersey. It is the home of the New Jersey Grizzlies of the Professional Inline Hockey Association Pro Division (PIHA Pro) and the Wallington Grizzlies of the Professional Inline Hockey Association Minor League (PIHAML).
