= Moran, Texas =

- City
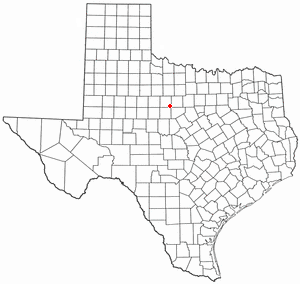
- Location of Moran, Texas

- Coordinates: 32°32′50″N 99°09′59″W
- Country: United States
- State: Texas
- County: Shackelford

Area
  - Total: 0.42 sq mi (1.10 km^{2})
  - Land: 0.42 sq mi (1.10 km^{2})
  - Water: 0 sq mi (0.00 km^{2})
- Elevation: 1,365 ft (416 m)

Population (2020)
  - Total: 226
  - Density: 532/sq mi (205/km^{2})
- Time zone: UTC-6 (Central (CST))
  - Summer (DST): UTC-5 (CDT)
- ZIP code: 76464
- Area code: 325
- FIPS code: 48-49320
- GNIS feature ID: 2411158

Moran is a city in southeast Shackelford County, Texas, United States. Its population was 226 at the 2020 census.

== Geography ==
Moran is situated at the intersection of Texas State Highway 6 and Farm to Market 576, about 15 miles southeast of Albany, 18 miles northwest of Cisco, 29 miles southwest of Breckenridge, and 42 miles east-northeast of Abilene. Nearby creeks include Deep Creek, Post Oak Creek, Battle Creek, and Hubbard Creek.

According to the United States Census Bureau, the city has a total area of 0.4 square mile (1.1 km^{2}), all land.

== History ==
Pioneers came to this area as early as the 1860s. During the Civil War (1861–1865), they built the temporary fortress settlement of Mugginsville on Deep Creek 5 miles north of the future town site of Moran. At one time, a branch of the Western Cattle Trail passed nearby. Population increased after the arrival of the Texas Central Railroad in 1882. Hulltown, the original name of the town, was established by Mary and George Washington "Swope" Hull of McDowell, Virginia, who opened a general store at the rail crossing on Deep Creek in 1883. Hull (1849–1911) was the first postmaster. He bought 160 acres between Post Oak and Deep Creeks and platted a town site in March 1884 (his family and he later moved to Oakland, California). Most of the property was bought by Bem Scott, a real-estate developer from Indiana, who eventually sold his interests in 1890 to Matthew D. Bray (1845–1926), a prominent local merchant and landowner. For unknown reasons, the town's name was changed to Hicks in 1890. Later, to secure a new railroad depot, the town was renamed a final time to Moran in 1892 for Texas Central Railroad owner Charles Moran of New York.

By 1900, the community had several businesses, a school, and Baptist, Church of Christ, Cumberland Presbyterian, and Methodist congregations. A newspaper was begun in 1895 and bank in 1902. In November 1910, the Cottle No. 1 natural gas well discovery opened the nearby Moran Field, and was the first commercial gas well completed in this vast West Texas area. In the spring of 1911, gas was piped to Moran for residential and business use. Within two years (in 1913) the cities of Albany, Cisco, and Abilene were supplied for the first time with natural gas. By October 1913, with five producing gas wells, the Moran Field won recognition as one of the most important sources of fossil fuels in Texas. For the next 15 years, oil and gas discoveries in the area made Moran a boom town with a peak population of 5,000–10,000 at one point in the 1920s. By the 1930s, the boom was over and the population gradually began its decline to the present day.

In the late 1980s, Moran achieved fame as the home of the National Fajita Cook-off, which brought thousands of visitors from all over the world to the sleepy town. In the 2000s, Moran became home to Slide Fire Solutions, a multimillion dollar bump stock production company. The local economy remains tied to farming, ranching, and oil and gas production.

Local Texas historical markers are devoted to: Moran (#3468), Cottle No. 1 Natural Gas Well (#1076), Granville E. Waters (#13204), Moran Cemetery (#17708), and Moran Church of Christ (#17SF02).

== Demographics ==
Historical population
Census	Pop.	Note	%±
1920	1,055		—
1930	907		−14.0%
1940	710		−21.7%
1950	610		−14.1%
1960	392		−35.7%
1970	335		−14.5%
1980	344		2.7%
1990	285		−17.2%
2000	233		−18.2%
2010	270		15.9%
2020	226		−16.3%
U.S. Decennial Census

=== 2020 census ===
As of the 2020 census, Moran had a population of 226, 98 households, and 72 families residing in the city. The median age was 44.0 years; 23.5% of residents were under 18 and 18.1% were 65 or older. For every 100 females, there were 105.5 males, and for every 100 females 18 and over, there were 101.2 males age 18 and over.

None of the residents lived in urban areas, while 100.0% lived in rural areas.

Of the 98 households, 40.8% had children under 18 living in them, 54.1% were married-couple households, 14.3% were households with a male householder and no spouse or partner present, and 26.5% were households with a female householder and no spouse or partner present. About 17.3% of all households were made up of individuals, and 11.2% had someone living alone who was 65 or older.

The city had 135 housing units, of which 27.4% were vacant. The homeowner vacancy rate was 4.8% and the rental vacancy rate was 16.0%.

Racial composition as of the 2020 census
Race	Number	Percent
White	211	93.4%
Some other race	5	2.2%
Two or more races	10	4.4%
Hispanic or Latino (of any race)	16	7.1%

=== 2000 census ===
As of the census of 2000, there were 233 people, 97 households, and 67 families residing in the city. The population density was 539.0 inhabitants per square mile (208.1/km^{2}). There were 146 housing units at an average density of 337.7 per square mile (130.4/km^{2}). The racial makeup of the city was 98.28% White, 0.86% from other races, and 0.86% from two or more races. Hispanic or Latino of any race were 4.72% of the population.

There were 97 households, out of which 24.7% had children under the age of 18 living with them, 54.6% were married couples living together, 11.3% had a female householder with no husband present, and 29.9% were non-families. 29.9% of all households were made up of individuals, and 15.5% had someone living alone who was 65 years of age or older. The average household size was 2.40 and the average family size was 2.90.

In the city, the population was spread out, with 22.7% under the age of 18, 6.0% from 18 to 24, 23.6% from 25 to 44, 26.6% from 45 to 64, and 21.0% who were 65 years of age or older. The median age was 43 years. For every 100 females, there were 89.4 males. For every 100 females age 18 and over, there were 87.5 males.

The median income for a household in the city was $23,750, and the median income for a family was $28,250. Males had a median income of $19,583 versus $31,250 for females. The per capita income for the city was $11,669. About 11.9% of families and 22.4% of the population were below the poverty line, including 40.5% of those under the age of eighteen and 13.5% of those 65 or over.

== Education ==
The City of Moran is served by the Moran Independent School District. The school's mascot is the bulldog and the school colors are purple and gold.

== Museum ==
The Moran Historical Museum, established in 1979 by the Moran Historical Society, has several displays of memorabilia devoted to the town's past. It is located in the restored former Moran Church of Christ building near the City Park.
