= Fort Griffin =

- U.S. National Register of Historic Places
- Texas State Historic Site
- Texas State Antiquities Landmark
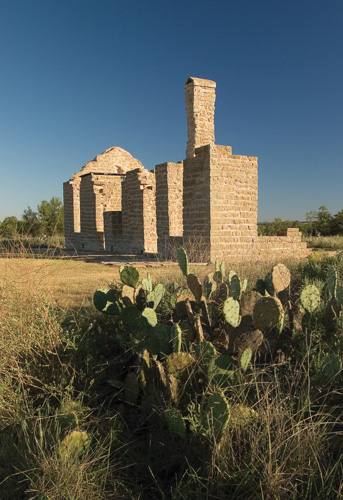
- Fort Griffin State Historic Site in 2009

- Location within Texas Location within the United States
- Nearest city: Albany, Texas
- Coordinates: 32°55′38″N 99°13′56″W
- Area: 204.6 acres (82.8 ha)
- Built: 1867
- NRHP reference No.: 71000962
- TSAL No.: 8200000559

Significant dates
- Added to NRHP: March 11, 1971
- Designated TSHS: December 21, 1935
- Designated TSAL: January 1, 1983

Fort Griffin, now a Texas state historic site as Fort Griffin State Historic Site, was a US Cavalry fort established 31 July 1867 by four companies of the Sixth Cavalry, U.S. Army, under the command of Lt. Col. S. D. Sturgis, in the western part of North Texas, specifically northwestern Shackelford County, to give settlers protection from early Comanche and Kiowa raids. Originally called Camp Wilson after Henry Hamilton Wilson, a recently deceased lieutenant and son of Republican senator and later vice president Henry Wilson, it was later named for Charles Griffin, a former Civil War Union general who had commanded, as de facto military governor, the Department of Texas during the early years of Reconstruction.

Other forts in the southwestern frontier fort system were Lancaster, Richardson, Concho, Belknap, Chadbourne, Stockton, Davis, Bliss, McKavett, Clark, McIntosh, Inge, and Phantom Hill in Texas, and Fort Sill in Oklahoma. "[S]ub posts or intermediate stations" were built, including Bothwick's Station on Salt Creek between Fort Richardson and Fort Belknap, Camp Wichita, near Buffalo Springs between Fort Richardson and Red River Station, and Mountain Pass between Fort Concho and Fort Griffin.

== History ==
The original intent was to build permanent stone buildings, but throughout its 14-year existence, the fort retained a temporary appearance. Log houses called “picket” huts, tents, and rough frame structures were constructed as temporary shelter. The scarcity of materials, shortage of funds, and daily demands of military duty allowed for only six of the more than 90 buildings of the fort to be built completely of stone.

Although considerable time was spent building and maintaining the fort, the majority of the time was spent defending and patrolling the frontier. Capt. Adna Chaffee fought the Comanche in a successful engagement in March 1868. Companies F, I, K, and L of the Sixth Cavalry were augmented when Lt. Col. S.B. Hayman's 17th Infantry arrived on 3 June 1868.

The fort served as a starting point for many expeditions headed westward, and for a time, it had a substantial settled community that built up around it, catering to passing wagon trains and military personnel who sought saloons for entertainment during their free or off-duty hours. It is northeast of Abilene (established after 1880), the seat of Taylor County.

By 1870, a very rough town called "the Flat" sprang up just north of Fort Griffin, which eventually became a stop-off point for cattle drives headed north to Dodge City, Kansas. During that time, several notable characters and gunfighters of the Old West drifted through, including Wyatt Earp, Doc Holliday, Dave Rudabaugh, Pat Garrett known for killing outlaw William Bonney (better known as "Billy the Kid"), and the brothers Bat and Jim Masterson. John Selman, who eventually became known for killing outlaw John Wesley Hardin, worked there and in surrounding counties as a deputy sheriff.

General William Tecumseh Sherman and Inspector General Randolph B. Marcy visited the fort on 15 May 1871.

Following the Red River War of 1874, the Comanche and Kiowa threat on the prairies waned, and rapid settlement by ranchers and farmer put Fort Griffin squarely in the settled area. Capt. j.B. Irvine, commanding Company A, Twenty-Second Infantry lowered the flag for the last time and marched to Fort Clark on 31 May 1879.

== In popular culture ==
The opening scenes of the 1957 movie Gunfight at the O.K.Corral, in which Doc Holliday kills a man in a saloon fight while Wyatt Earp looks on, take place in Fort Griffin.

Fort Griffin is the setting of the final scene in Cormac McCarthy's 1985 novel Blood Meridian. It is portrayed as a center of prostitution and violence.

== Gallery ==
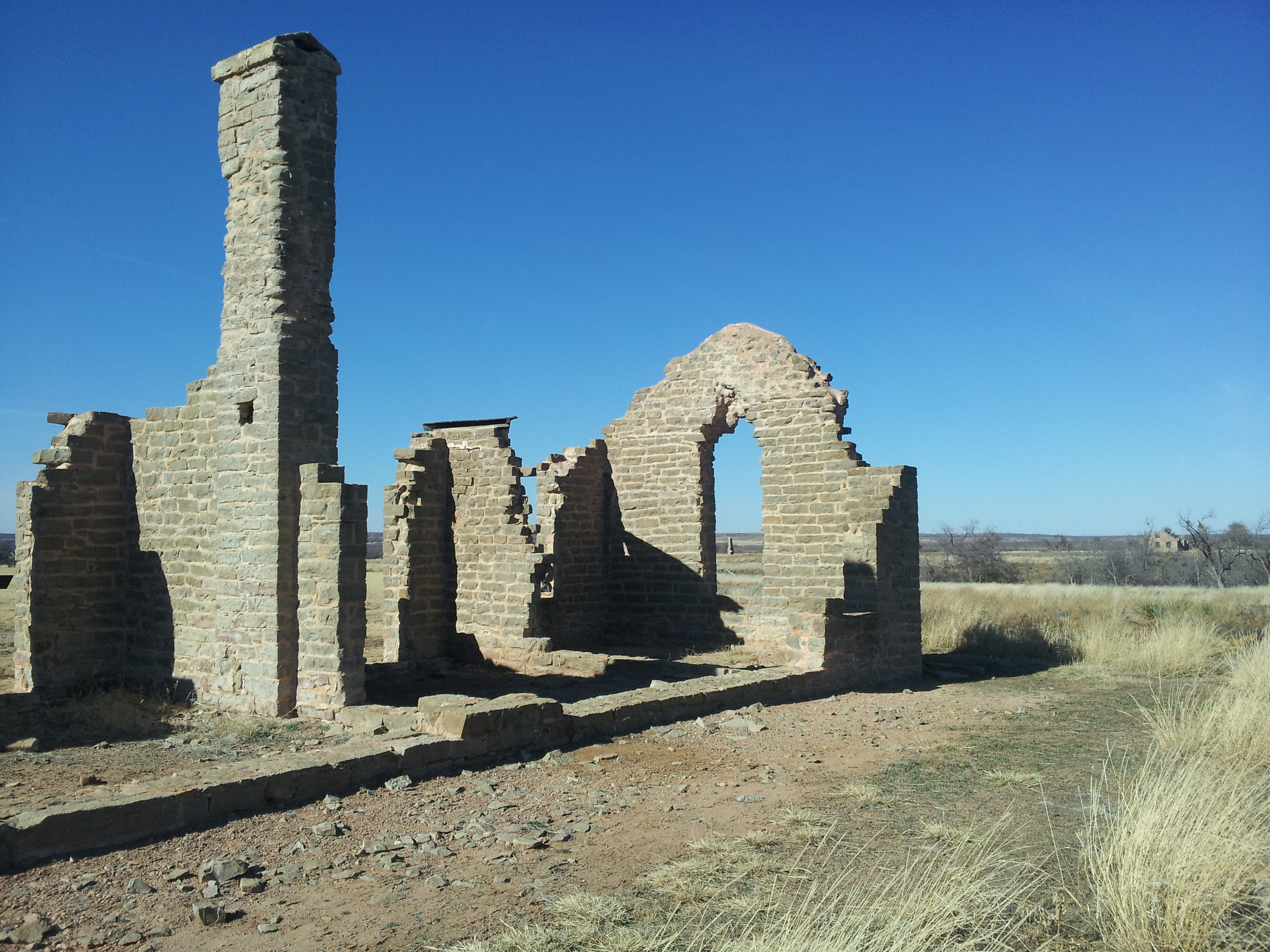
Hospital

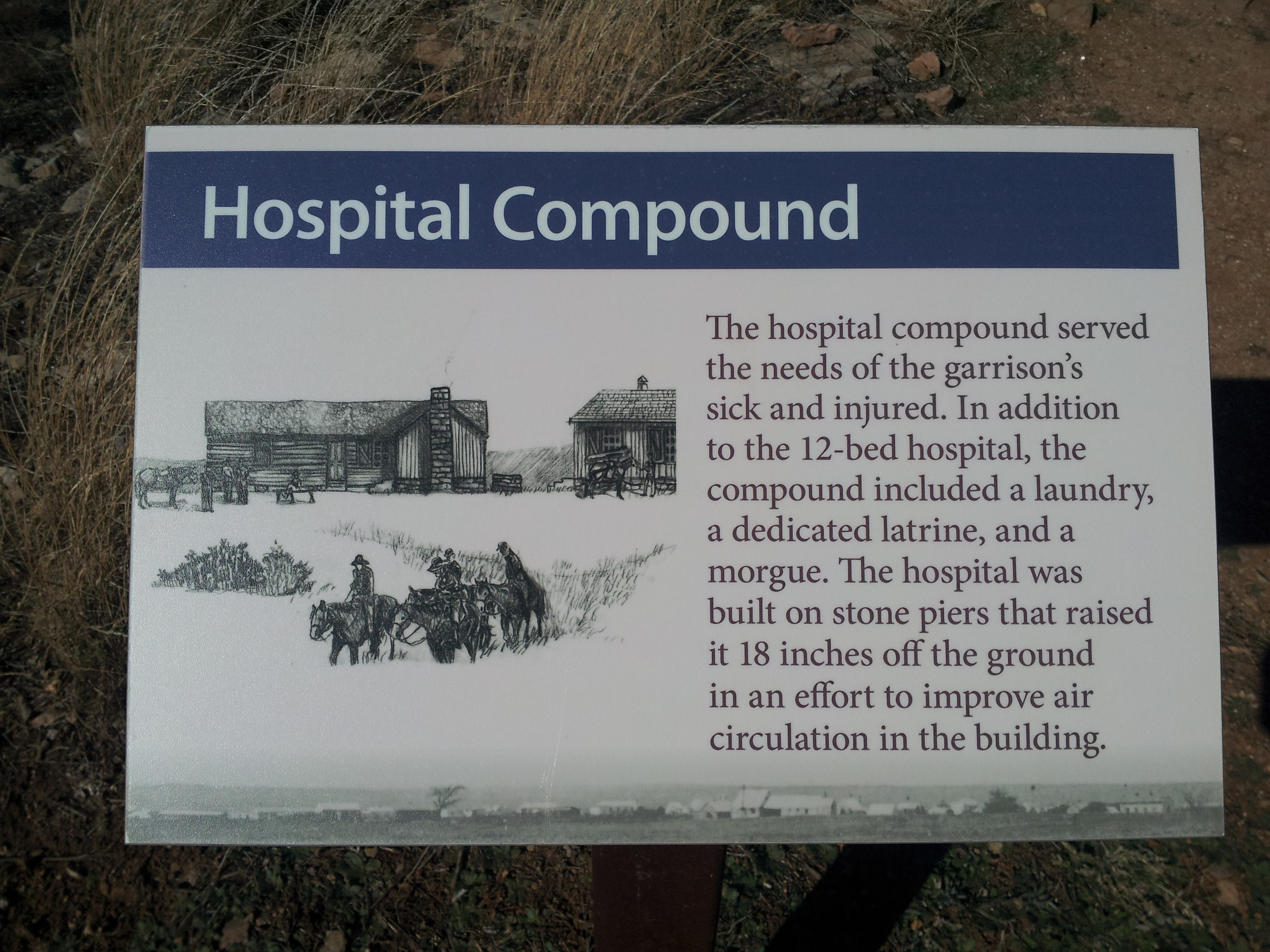
Hospital marker

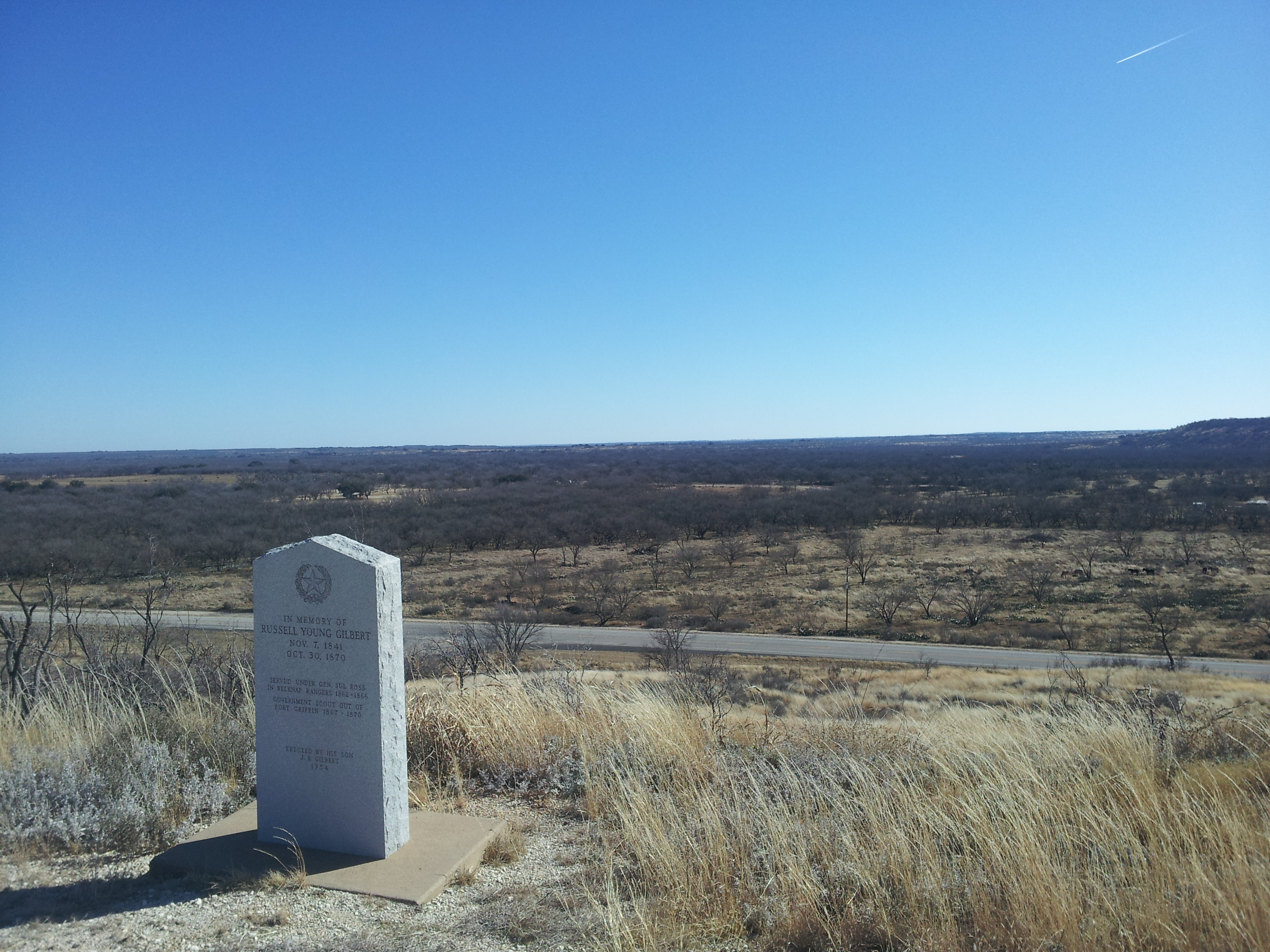
Clear Fork of the Brazos River looking from the top of "Government Hill"

== Preservation ==
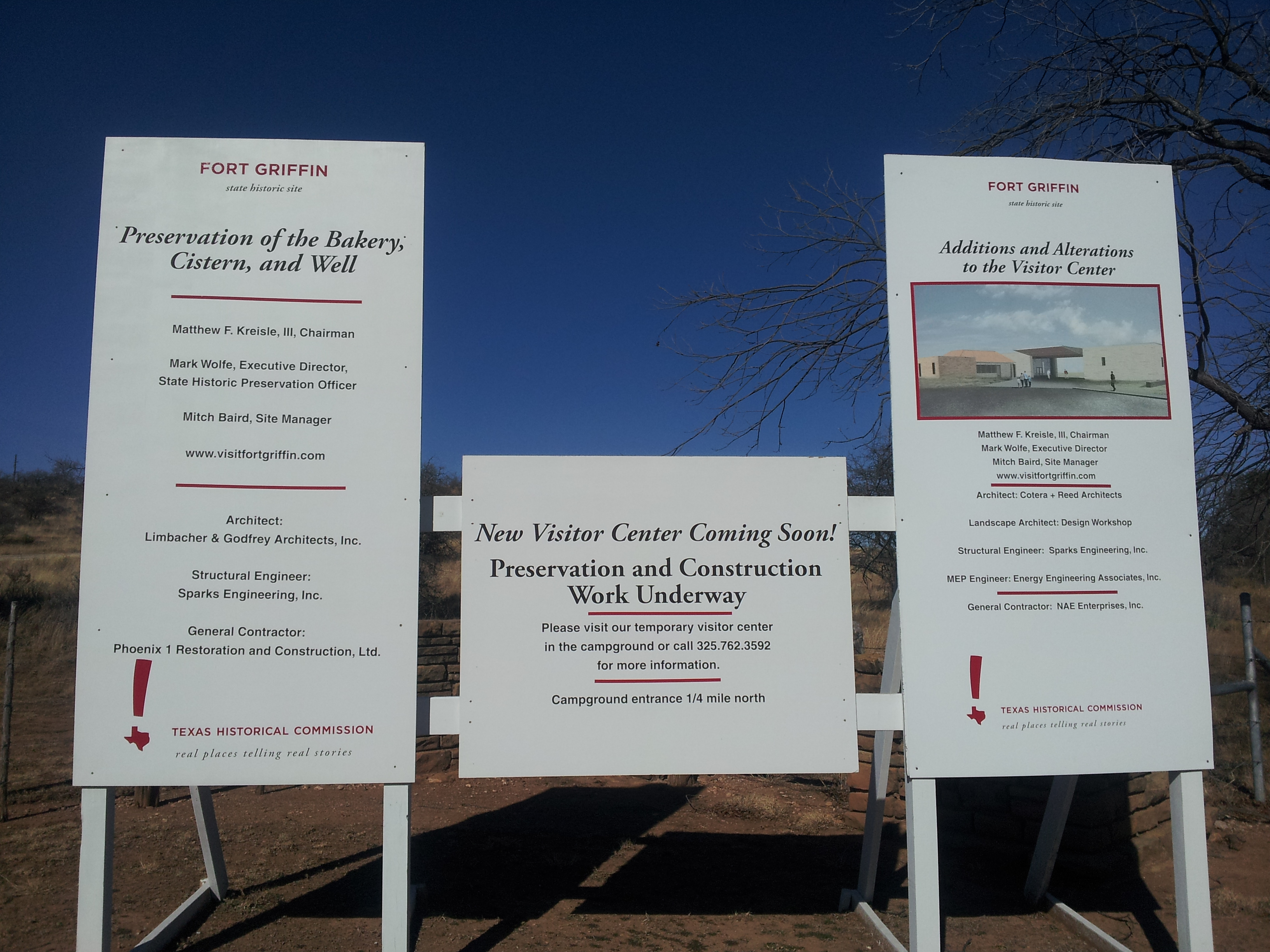
Fort Griffin renovation

On January 1, 2008, Fort Griffin was transferred from the Texas Parks and Wildlife Department to the Texas Historical Commission.

During the last two weekends of June, the Fort Griffin Fandangle, a Western musical production, is presented by residents of Albany in the Prairie Theater. The program, the content of which is changed each year, began in 1938, and is billed as "Texas' Oldest Outdoor Musical". In addition, a portion of the official state herd of Texas Longhorns is maintained at Fort Griffin.

== Climate ==
The climate in this area is characterized by hot, humid summers and generally mild to cool winters. According to the Köppen climate classification, Fort Griffin has a humid subtropical climate, Cfa on climate maps.

== See also ==
- National Register of Historic Places listings in Shackelford County, Texas
- Texas Forts Trail
- Forts of Texas
- List of Texas state historic sites
- List of ghost towns in Texas
