= Fort Griffin Fandangle =

1938 musical by Robert Nail

- Fandangle Logo
- Music: Robert Nail; Alice Reynolds; James Ball; Louann George; Elsa Turner; Bill Overton
- Lyrics: Robert Nail; Alice Reynolds; James Ball; Louann George; Elsa Turner; Bill Overton
- Productions: 1938-1940 Albany, Texas; 1947-1957 Albany, Texas; 1964 Canyon, Texas; 1965-present Albany, Texas

The Fort Griffin Fandangle is the oldest outdoor musical in the state of Texas. The musical takes place at an outdoor theater, called The Prairie Theatre, near Albany, Texas. Created by Robert Nail in 1938, the Fandangle has grown to a cast of over 400 and celebrates the founding of Fort Griffin and the settling of Albany. The show is attended by over 10,000 people each year. It is performed annually on Friday, and Saturday evenings of the last two weeks in June.

== Plot synopsis ==
The Fort Griffin Fandangle traces the historical and cultural development of the area along the Clear Fork of the Brazos River in northern Shackelford County near Fort Griffin, the military outpost that from 1867 to 1881 provided protection for settlers in the region and gave rise to the town of Albany. The story is recalled through the memory of two old-timers of the region, a cattleman and his wife, who sit on the porch of a ranch house to reveal the past as they remember it. The production consists of a series of segments, each based on historical material introduced by the narrators and then interpreted by one or more songs and dancing.

== History ==
The Fandangle can trace its beginning to a performance of Dr. Shackelford’s Paradise, written and directed by Albany native Robert Edward Nail Jr., with the help of local music teacher Alice Reynolds. "Dr. Shackelford'd Paradise" was an outdoor musical pageant presented by the senior class that portrayed the history of Shackelford County. The play was so well received that it was expanded to include adults in the cast and was produced that summer under the name Fort Griffin Fandangle. A sponsoring organization, the Fandangle Association, was first incorporated in 1947. Nail established three rules: first, anybody with ties in Shackelford County could be in the show; second, the show would have to be publicized by word of mouth, not by paid publicity; and third, there would be no profanity in the show.

Alice Reynolds was active from the beginning in writing songs, in designing sets and the numerous banners associated with the play, particularly the steer-head and fiddle emblem that represents the Fandangle, and in sketching some of the elaborate costumes. For many years she also played the organ for the performances. She died in May 1984.

The title of the show was chosen for its alliteration and euphony. Fandangle is a provincial version of Spanish fandango, a fast dance. Originally only traditional or folk music and dances were used, but as the show was repeated in later years by popular demand, new material was written and included in the performances, a practice that is still followed. Although material is repeated from year to year, each season's version varies from any previous show in both content and focus.

The Fandangle was retired during World War II because writer-director Robert Nail was serving his country in the armed services, as were many of the other Fandangle personnel. The Fandangle was revived in 1947 and ran through 1957. For a number of reasons, the Fandangle was not performed again until 1964 when the West Texas Panhandle Heritage Foundation contracted with Robert Nail to bring the Fandangle to Canyon, Texas, to open the new outdoor amphitheatre in Palo Duro Canyon. In 1979 the Sixty-Sixth Texas Legislature designated the Fort Griffin Fandangle as one of four official state plays of Texas.

In addition to Nail and Reynolds, numerous other citizens have contributed significantly. Songs written by James Ball, Elsa Turner, and later Luann George, who replaced Reynolds as organist in 1983. Marge Bray, long-time choreographer for the show, assumed the directorship after James Ball, who served for four years after Nail's death in 1968. Of particular significance to the development of the Fandangle over the years is the work of G. P. Crutchfield, engineer with MArshal R. Young Oil Co., who built the authentic replica of the Butterfield stagecoach, the machine representing the Texas Central Railroad train, a self-contained blacksmith shop on wheels, and the steam calliope with the help of Cecil R. Dye, which is still played regularly before performances. All of these works and many other entries, bands, and horse units appear in the annual parade, which occurs on Thursday afternoon of the second week.

The early performances were held at the local football stadium. The Prairie Theatre, west of town, was constructed in 1965, on land leased for a dollar a year from the John Alexander Matthews estate. Performances have been held there since that time. Full-scale productions are held only in Albany, but short versions have been given in many locations over the years. These are usually performed in the spring and serve as the core around which the major show is built during late May and early June. These "samplers" were performed in Europe in 1967 and 1976 and in Washington, D.C., in 1984. After Marge Bray's death in 1994, Betsy Black Parsons assumed directing responsibilities. In 2008 the Fort Griffin Fandangle celebrated its seventieth anniversary as well as the sesquicentennial of Albany. A "sampler" show was performed at the Lyndon B. Johnson National Historical Park LBJ Ranch that year. By this time the Fandangle had grown to more than 400 cast and crew members.

== Reviews ==
The Dallas Morning News describes Fandangle accordingly: "as professional as a multi-million dollar Broadway musical, with sets and costumes to match." The Abilene Reporter-News calls the program "Frontier history served up with genuine earthiness, spiced by rare humor."
