= Pizza Land =

American pizzeria featured in The Sopranos

Coordinates: 40.781632°N 74.138002°W

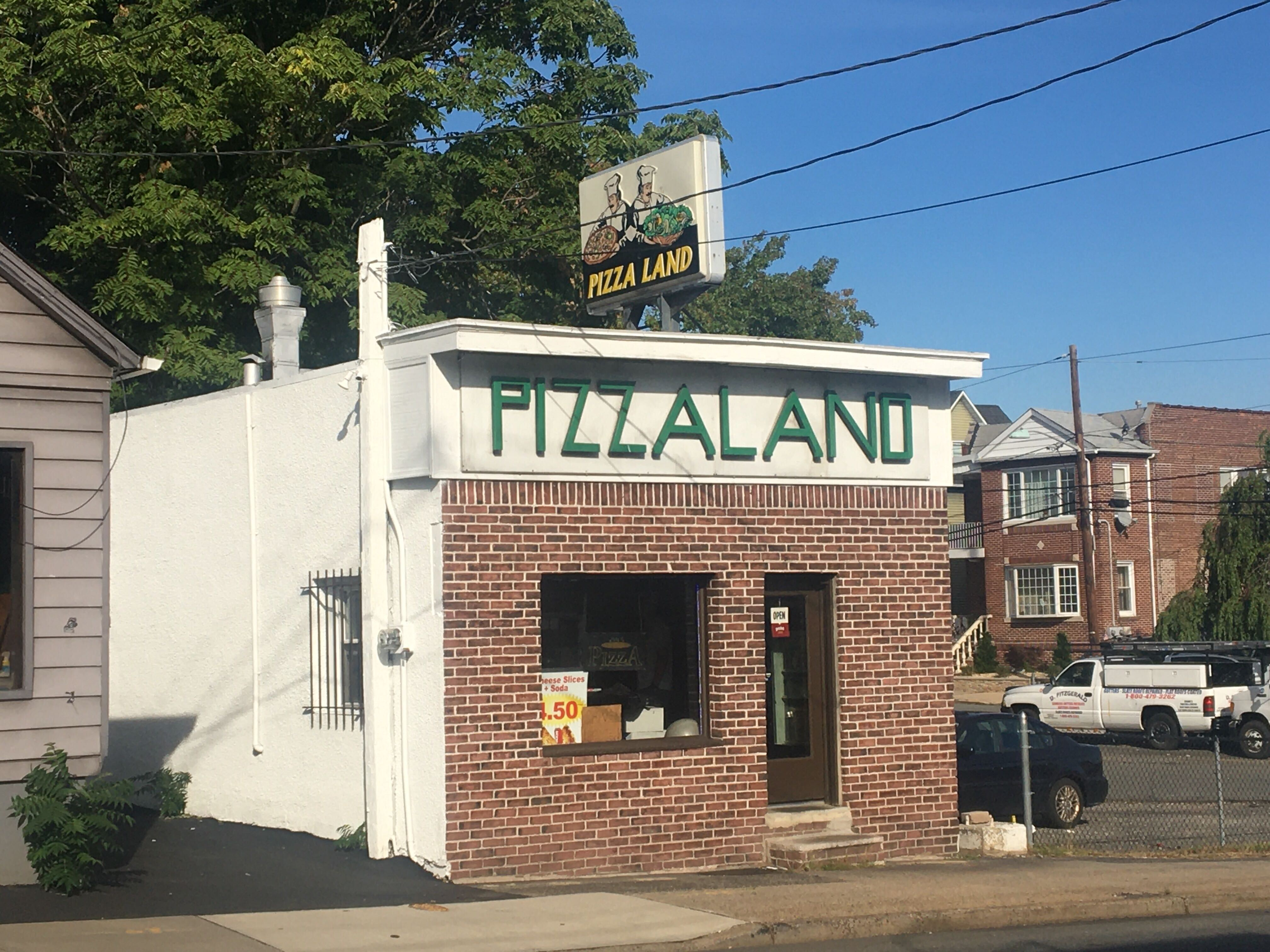
- The business in 2021.
- Type: Private
- Industry: Restaurants, Food Delivery
- Founded: 1965; 61 years ago
- Headquarters: North Arlington, New Jersey, United States
- Products: Pizza
- Owner: Eddie Twdroos

Pizza Land, stylized as PIZZALAND on its front sign, spelled Pizzaland in press accounts, and as two words on a separate sign and window, is an American pizzeria at 260 Belleville Turnpike in North Arlington, New Jersey, which features in the opening credits of The Sopranos. In Law & Order episode 10.6, "Marathon" (1999), a pizza box from the restaurant was used by a suspect to transport and conceal firearms.

The pizzeria was opened in 1965 by Italian immigrant Pietro DiPiazza. It was taken over by Pietro's younger brother, Fred Di Piazza. Fred passed ownership to his adopted son, Tony Di Piazza. Around 2005, Al Pawlowicz purchased the restaurant. Following Pawlowicz's death in 2010, the shop was closed for a year before being purchased by Eddie Twdroos.
