= Moran Independent School District =

School district in Texas

Coordinates: 32.5453°N 99.1706°W

Moran Independent School District is a public school district based in Moran, Texas. Located in Shackelford County, small portions of the district extend into Callahan and Stephens Counties.

== History ==
The district changed to a four-day school week in fall 2022.

== Academic achievement ==
In 2009, the school district was rated "academically acceptable" by the Texas Education Agency.

== Special programs ==
Moran High School plays six-man football.

== See also ==
- List of school districts in Texas
- List of high schools in Texas
