= North Arlington School District =

School district in Bergen County, New Jersey, US

Address
- 222 Ridge Road North Arlington, Bergen County, New Jersey, 07031; United States
- Coordinates: 40.788921°N 74.132834°W

District information
- Grades: PreK-12
- Superintendent: Stephen Yurchak
- Business administrator: Samantha Dembowski
- Schools: 6

Students and staff
- Enrollment: 1,915 (as of 2020–21)
- Faculty: 144.2 FTEs
- Student–teacher ratio: 13.2:1

Other information
- District Factor Group: DE
- Website: www.navikings.org
Ind.	Per pupil	District spending	Rank (*)	K-12 average	%± vs. average
1A	Total Spending	$15,972	8	$18,891	−15.5%
1	Budgetary Cost	11,890	7	14,783	−19.6%
2	Classroom Instruction	7,114	9	8,763	−18.8%
6	Support Services	1,315	2	2,392	−45.0%
8	Administrative Cost	1,551	18	1,485	4.4%
10	Operations & Maintenance	1,431	15	1,783	−19.7%
13	Extracurricular Activities	293	6	268	9.3%
16	Median Teacher Salary	54,520	10	64,043
Data from NJDoE 2014 Taxpayers' Guide to Education Spending. *Of K-12 districts with up to 1,800 students. Lowest spending=1; Highest=49

The North Arlington School District is a comprehensive community public school district that serves students in pre-kindergarten through twelfth grade from North Arlington in Bergen County, in the U.S. state of New Jersey.

As of the 2021–22 school year, the district, comprised of six schools, had an enrollment of 1,915 students and 144.2 classroom teachers (on an FTE basis), for a student–teacher ratio of 13.2:1.

The district is classified by the New Jersey Department of Education as being in District Factor Group "DE", the fifth-highest of eight groupings. District Factor Groups organize districts statewide to allow comparison by common socioeconomic characteristics of the local districts. From lowest socioeconomic status to highest, the categories are A, B, CD, DE, FG, GH, I and J.

In the 1970s and 1980s, declining enrollment led North Arlington to be one of the few school districts in the state that featured involuntary "combined classes" whereby classes at their Roosevelt School for grades 4 and 5 and for grades 6 and 7 were combined into a single classroom with a single teacher for each pair of grades.

== Awards and recognition ==
In 2010, Roosevelt Elementary School was recognized with the National Blue Ribbon Schools Award of Excellence by the United States Department of Education.

== Schools ==
Schools in the district (with 2020–21 school enrollment data from the National Center for Education Statistics) are:

Elementary schools

- Franklin D. Roosevelt Elementary School with 123 students in grades PreK-5
  - Alicia Giammanco, principal
- George Washington Elementary School with 325 students in grades PreK-5
  - Elaine Jaume, principal
- Thomas Jefferson Elementary School with 172 students in grades K-5
  - Marie Griggs, principal
- Susan B Anthony Elementary School with 248 students in grades PreK-5
  - Jennifer Rodriguez, principal

Middle school

- Veterans Middle School with 464 students in grades 6-8
  - Nicole Campbell Russo, principal

High school

- North Arlington High School with 548 students in grades 9-12
  - Patrick D. Bott, principal

== Administration ==
Core members of the district's administration are:

- Stephen M. Yurchak, superintendent
- Samantha Dembowski

== Board of education ==
The district's board of education, comprised of five members, sets policy and oversees the fiscal and educational operation of the district through its administration. As a Type II school district, the board's trustees are elected directly by voters to serve three-year terms of office on a staggered basis, with either one or two seats up for election each year held (since 2012) as part of the November general election. The board appoints a superintendent to oversee the district's day-to-day operations and a business administrator to supervise the business functions of the district.
