= New Albany High School =

New Albany High School may refer to:

- New Albany High School (Indiana) in New Albany, Indiana
- New Albany High School (Ohio) in New Albany, Ohio
- New Albany High School (Mississippi) in New Albany, Mississippi

== See also ==
Albany High School (disambiguation)
