= Albany Municipal Airport (Texas) =

- IATA: none; ICAO: none; FAA LID: T23

Summary
- Airport type: Public
- Owner: City of Albany
- Serves: Albany, Texas
- Elevation AMSL: 1,415 ft (431 m)
- Coordinates: 32°43′17″N 099°16′03″W

Map
- Location within Texas

Runways
Direction	Length		Surface
Direction	ft	m	Surface
17/35	5,000	1,524	Asphalt

Statistics (2021)
- Aircraft operations (year ending 8/31/2021): 2,100
- Based aircraft: 8
- Source: Federal Aviation Administration

Albany Municipal Airport (FAA LID: T23) is a city-owned public-use airport located two nautical miles (3.7 km) east of the central business district of Albany, a city in Shackelford County, Texas, United States.

== Facilities and aircraft ==
Albany Municipal Airport covers an area of 70 acres (28 ha) at an elevation of 1,415 feet (431 m) above mean sea level. It has one runway designated 17/35 with an asphalt surface measuring 5,000 by 75 feet (1,524 x 23 m).

For the 12-month period ending August 31, 2021, the airport had 2,100 general aviation aircraft operations, an average of 40 per week. At that time there were 8 aircraft based at this airport, 7 single-engine, and 1 helicopter.

== See also ==
- List of airports in Texas
