= North Arlington, New Jersey =

Borough in Bergen County, New Jersey, US

- Borough
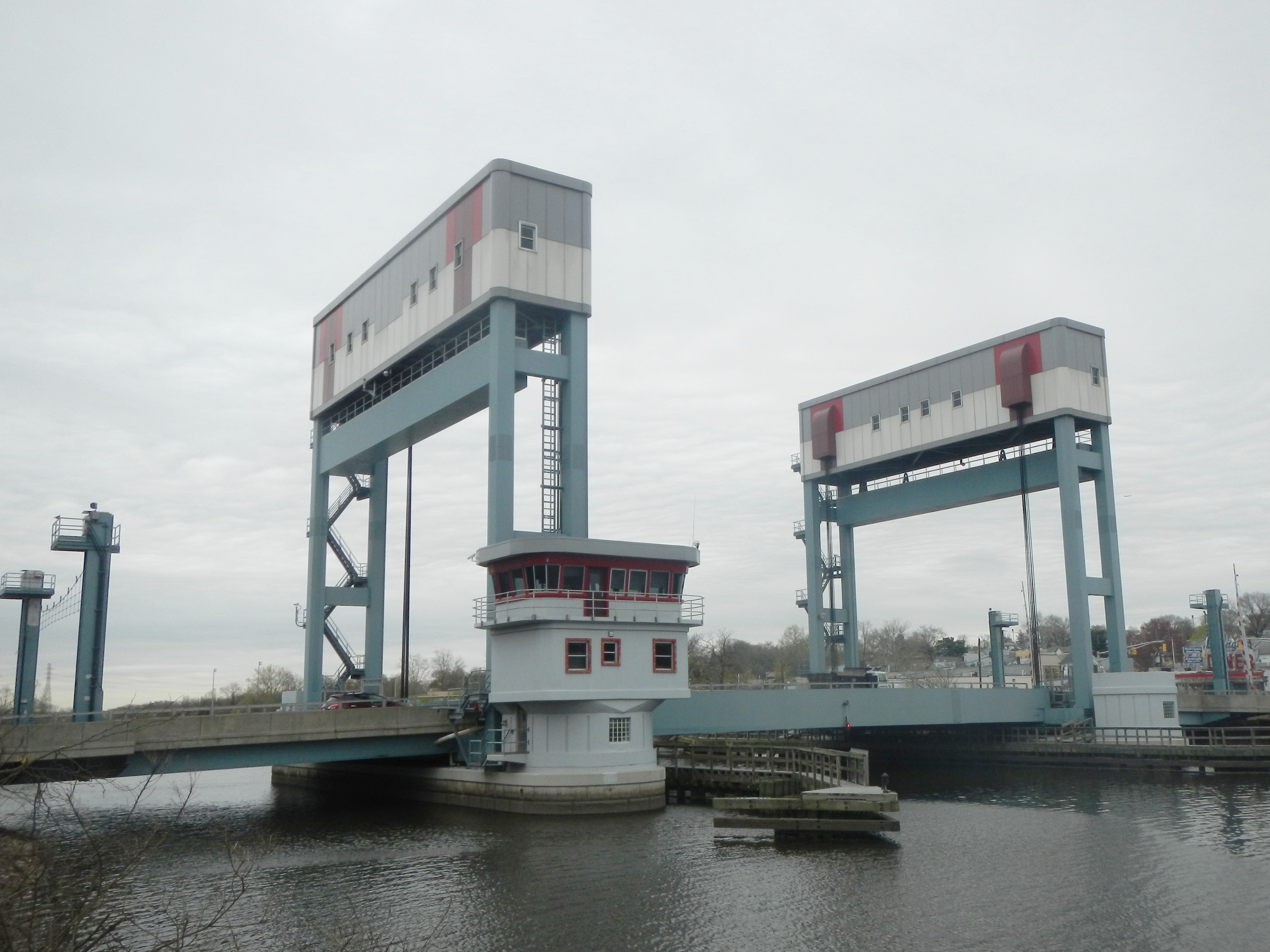
- Belleville Turnpike Bridge

- Seal

- Location of North Arlington in Bergen County highlighted in red (left). Inset map: Location of Bergen County in New Jersey highlighted in orange (right).

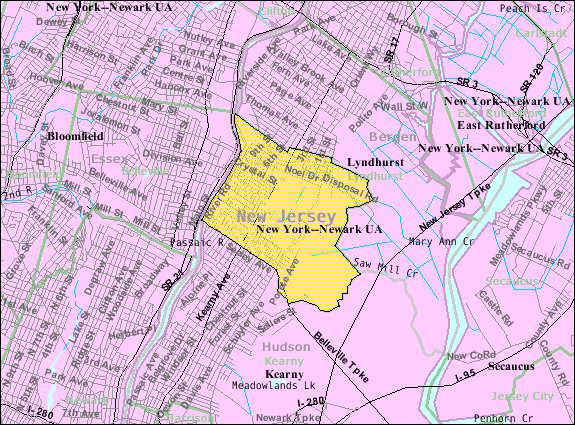
- Census Bureau map of North Arlington, New Jersey

- Location in Bergen County Location in New Jersey Location in the United States
- Coordinates: 40.786256°N 74.12622°W
- Country: United States
- State: New Jersey
- County: Bergen
- Incorporated: March 9, 1896

Government
  - Type: Borough
  - Body: Borough Council
  - Mayor: Daniel H. Pronti (R, term ends December 31, 2026)
  - Administrator: Stephen Lo Iacono
  - Municipal clerk: Kathleen Moore

Area
  - Total: 2.53 sq mi (6.55 km^{2})
  - Land: 2.48 sq mi (6.43 km^{2})
  - Water: 0.046 sq mi (0.12 km^{2}) 1.78%
  - Rank: 372th of 565 in state 38th of 70 in county
- Elevation: 85 ft (26 m)

Population (2020)
  - Total: 16,457
  - Estimate (2024): 16,694
  - Rank: 161st of 565 in state 20th of 70 in county
  - Density: 6,625.2/sq mi (2,558.0/km^{2})
  - Rank: 75th of 565 in state 23rd of 70 in county
- Time zone: UTC−05:00 (Eastern (EST))
  - Summer (DST): UTC−04:00 (Eastern (EDT))
- ZIP Code: 07031
- Area code: 201
- FIPS code: 3400352320
- GNIS feature ID: 0885323
- Website: www.northarlington.org

North Arlington is a borough in Bergen County, in the U.S. state of New Jersey. As of the 2020 United States census, the borough's population was 16,457, an increase of 1,065 (+6.9%) from the 2010 census count of 15,392, which in turn reflected an increase of 211 (+1.4%) from the 15,181 counted in the 2000 census.

As the site of Holy Cross Cemetery, which has interred almost 290,000 individuals since its establishment in 1915, and with another Jewish cemetery including several thousand more burials, North Arlington has almost 20 times more dead people than living, with more burials than the living population of Newark, the state's largest city. Holy Cross has an average of 2,600 interments each year, of which about 65% are burials, with the remainder split between entombment in mausoleums or crypts and burial of cremated remains. Expansion of the mausoleum will bring its capacity to nearly 36,000 interments, with the cemetery's total capacity of about 750,000 expected to last past the year 2090. The cemetery covers 208 acres (84 ha) and was assessed at $185 million, though its non-profit status means that the municipality generates no tax revenue from a property that covers almost an eighth of the borough's land area.

North Arlington was ranked eighth by Money magazine on its list of "Best Places to Live 2017", which cited the borough's healthy economy, affordable homes and a high quality of life.

== History ==
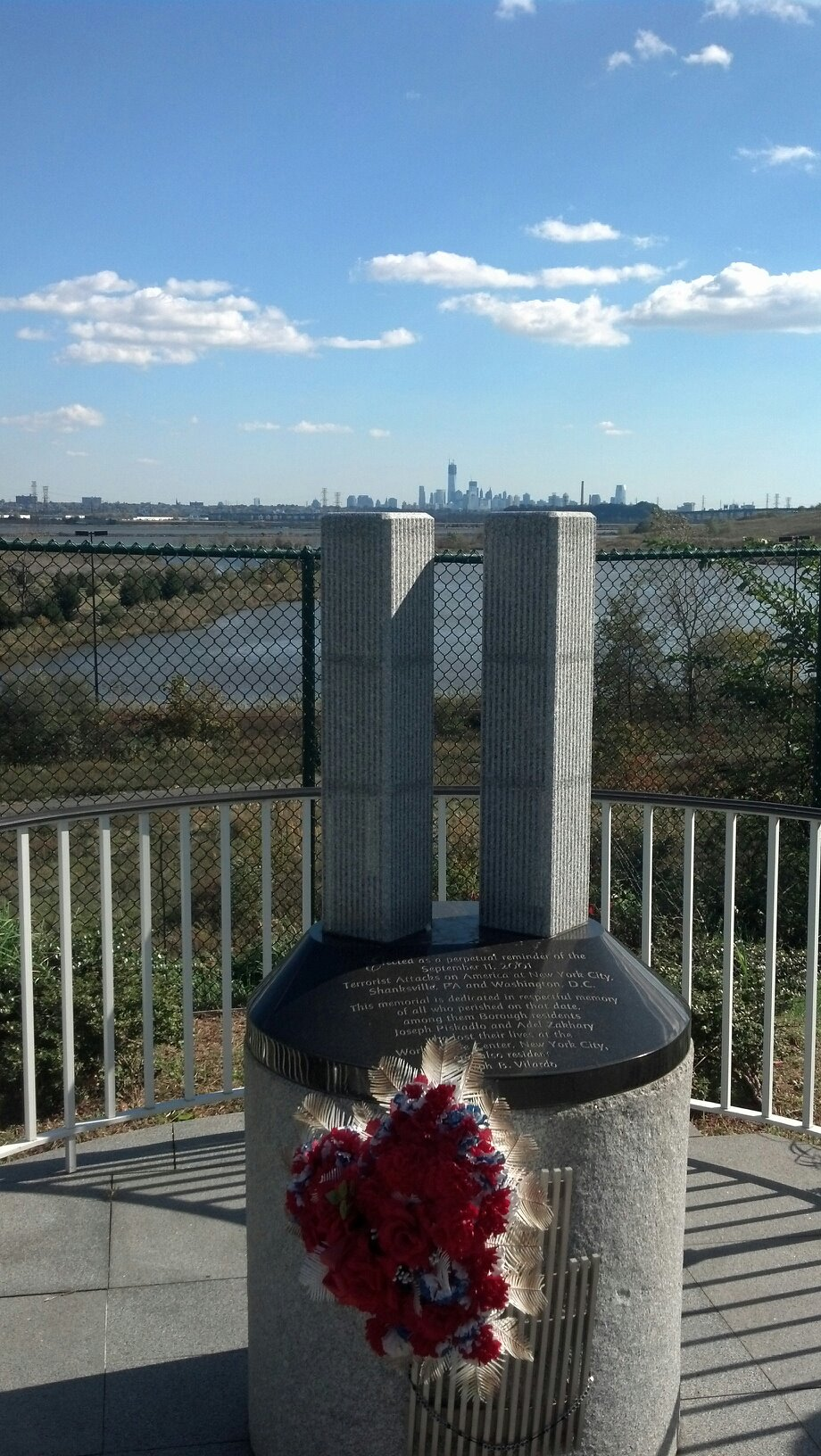
North Arlington erected a 9/11 memorial at the James Zadroga Soccer Field.

North Arlington was originally part of an area called "New Barbadoes Neck".

Copper was mined at the Schuyler Copper Mine in present-day North Arlington during the 18th and 19th centuries. It was one of the first true copper mines in North America.

In 1755, the first steam engine in North America was assembled in North Arlington. The Newcomen steam engine was imported from England by John Schuyler to pump water out of his copper mine. He hired engineer Josiah Hornblower to assemble the machinery.

North Arlington was formed by a referendum passed on March 9, 1896, and incorporated as a borough by an act of the New Jersey Legislature on March 11, 1896, from area taken from Union Township. It was called North Arlington because it was north of the Arlington section of Kearny, which had been named from the Arlington Station on the Erie Railroad.

North Arlington, together with Lyndhurst and Rutherford, was the site of the EnCap project, an effort to remediate landfills on the 785-acre (3.18 km^{2}) site and construct homes and golf courses on top of the cleaned up site. On May 27, 2008, the New Jersey Meadowlands Commission terminated its agreement with EnCap Golf Holdings, the company that had the contract to redevelop the site, after the company had missed targets to clean up the landfills as part of the project.

On November 18, 2015, North Arlington approved plans for FedEx to build a 139,000-square-foot (12,900 m^{2}) freight distribution facility on a former steel dumping ground on Porete Avenue. FedEx pledged to build a new access road to Porete Avenue from Belleville Turnpike, complete with a signalized traffic light, as part of construction. The company planned to hire 225 people to work at the facility. FedEx planned to complete the building by early 2017.

== Geography ==
According to the United States Census Bureau, the borough had a total area of 2.53 square miles (6.55 km^{2}), including 2.48 square miles (6.43 km^{2}) of land and 0.05 square miles (0.12 km^{2}) of water (1.78%).

North Arlington is the southernmost municipality in Bergen County, New Jersey. The borough borders the municipalities of Lyndhurst in Bergen County; Belleville in Essex County; and Kearny in Hudson County.

Route 7 (Belleville Turnpike) occupies much of the border of between Bergen County to the north and Hudson County to the south, with North Arlington on one side and Kearny on the other. The bordering neighborhood in Kearny is called Arlington, from which the name North Arlington is derived. Cemeteries lie along both sides of the route, with North Arlington Jewish Cemetery in Bergen and Arlington Memorial Park in Hudson.

== Demographics ==
Historical population
Census	Pop.	Note	%±
1900	290		—
1910	437		50.7%
1920	1,767		304.3%
1930	8,263		367.6%
1940	9,904		19.9%
1950	15,970		61.2%
1960	17,477		9.4%
1970	18,096		3.5%
1980	16,587		−8.3%
1990	13,790		−16.9%
2000	15,181		10.1%
2010	15,392		1.4%
2020	16,457		6.9%
2024 (est.)	16,694	▲	1.4%
Population sources: 1900–1920 1900–1910; 1910–1930 1900–2020; 2000 2010 2020

=== Racial and ethnic composition ===
North Arlington borough, New Jersey – Racial and ethnic composition Note: the US Census treats Hispanic/Latino as an ethnic category. This table excludes Latinos from the racial categories and assigns them to a separate category. Hispanics/Latinos may be of any race.
Race / Ethnicity (NH = Non-Hispanic)	Pop 2000	Pop 2010	Pop 2020	% 2000	% 2010	% 2020
White alone (NH)	12,438	10,567	9,245	81.93%	68.65%	56.18%
Black or African American alone (NH)	58	148	257	0.38%	0.96%	1.56%
Native American or Alaska Native alone (NH)	10	19	7	0.07%	0.12%	0.04%
Asian alone (NH)	841	1,201	1,173	5.54%	7.80%	7.13%
Native Hawaiian or Pacific Islander alone (NH)	2	2	2	0.01%	0.01%	0.01%
Other race alone (NH)	22	91	166	0.14%	0.59%	1.01%
Mixed race or Multiracial (NH)	205	153	498	1.35%	0.99%	3.03%
Hispanic or Latino (any race)	1,605	3,211	5,109	10.57%	20.86%	31.04%
Total	15,181	15,392	16,457	100.00%	100.00%	100.00%

=== 2020 census ===
As of the 2020 census, North Arlington had a population of 16,457. The median age was 41.5 years. 18.3% of residents were under the age of 18 and 17.9% of residents were 65 years of age or older. For every 100 females there were 93.8 males, and for every 100 females age 18 and over there were 91.7 males age 18 and over.

100.0% of residents lived in urban areas, while 0.0% lived in rural areas.

There were 6,525 households in North Arlington, of which 28.7% had children under the age of 18 living in them. Of all households, 49.0% were married-couple households, 16.9% were households with a male householder and no spouse or partner present, and 28.2% were households with a female householder and no spouse or partner present. About 27.1% of all households were made up of individuals and 11.8% had someone living alone who was 65 years of age or older.

There were 6,749 housing units, of which 3.3% were vacant. The homeowner vacancy rate was 0.8% and the rental vacancy rate was 3.1%.

=== 2010 census ===
The 2010 United States census counted 15,392 people, 6,295 households, and 4,117 families in the borough. The population density was 6,010.3 per square mile (2,320.6/km^{2}). There were 6,573 housing units at an average density of 2,566.6 per square mile (991.0/km^{2}). The racial makeup was 82.59% (12,712) White, 1.43% (220) Black or African American, 0.23% (36) Native American, 7.87% (1,211) Asian, 0.01% (2) Pacific Islander, 6.03% (928) from other races, and 1.84% (283) from two or more races. Hispanic or Latino of any race were 20.86% (3,211) of the population.

Of the 6,295 households, 25.4% had children under the age of 18; 49.4% were married couples living together; 12.0% had a female householder with no husband present and 34.6% were non-families. Of all households, 29.4% were made up of individuals and 12.7% had someone living alone who was 65 years of age or older. The average household size was 2.44 and the average family size was 3.05.

17.6% of the population were under the age of 18, 7.8% from 18 to 24, 29.5% from 25 to 44, 28.8% from 45 to 64, and 16.3% who were 65 years of age or older. The median age was 41.5 years. For every 100 females, the population had 91.9 males. For every 100 females ages 18 and older there were 88.2 males.

The Census Bureau's 2006–2010 American Community Survey showed that (in 2010 inflation-adjusted dollars) median household income was $71,232 (with a margin of error of +/− $6,829) and the median family income was $87,854 (+/− $9,834). Males had a median income of $56,437 (+/− $4,127) versus $47,794 (+/− $4,233) for females. The per capita income for the borough was $34,265 (+/− $2,555). About 4.6% of families and 5.5% of the population were below the poverty line, including 6.7% of those under age 18 and 5.6% of those age 65 or over.

Same-sex couples headed 39 households in 2010, an increase from the 28 counted in 2000.

=== 2000 census ===
As of the 2000 United States census there were 15,181 people, 6,392 households, and 4,129 families residing in the borough. The population density was 5,880.7 inhabitants per square mile (2,270.6/km^{2}). There were 6,529 housing units at an average density of 2,529.2 per square mile (976.5/km^{2}). The ethnic makeup of the borough was 89.61% White, 0.46% African American, 0.14% Native American, 5.61% Asian, 0.01% Pacific Islander, 2.29% from other races, and 1.87% from two or more races. Hispanic or Latino of any race were 10.57% of the population.

There were 6,392 households, out of which 24.5% had children under the age of 18 living with them, 49.7% were married couples living together, 11.1% had a female householder with no husband present, and 35.4% were non-families. 30.9% of all households were made up of individuals, and 14.3% had someone living alone who was 65 years of age or older. The average household size was 2.37 and the average family size was 3.00.

In the borough the population was spread out, with 18.0% under the age of 18, 7.6% from 18 to 24, 30.8% from 25 to 44, 24.2% from 45 to 64, and 19.4% who were 65 years of age or older. The median age was 41 years. For every 100 females, there were 88.7 males. For every 100 females age 18 and over, there were 84.1 males.

The median income for a household in the borough was $51,787, and the median income for a family was $62,483. Males had a median income of $41,512 versus $34,769 for females. The per capita income for the borough was $24,441. About 3.4% of families and 5.1% of the population were below the poverty line, including 6.2% of those under age 18 and 6.1% of those age 65 or over.

=== Crime ===
According to the FBI's 2011 Uniform Crime Report, there were 263 crimes in the borough in 2011 (vs. 200 in 2010), of which 19 were violent crimes (vs. 12 in 2010) and 244 non-violent crimes (vs. 188 in the previous year). The 2011 total crime rate per thousand residents was 17.1 (vs. 13.0 in 2010), compared to 13.6 in Bergen County and 24.7 statewide. The violent crime rate was 1.2 per thousand in 2011 (up from 0.8 in the previous year), while the rate was 1.0 in the county and 3.1 in New Jersey.

== Economy ==
Companies based in North Arlington include Pizza Land, located at 260 Belleville Turnpike, which was featured in the opening credits of The Sopranos. Additionally, in Law & Order episode 10.6, "Marathon" (1999), a pizza box from the restaurant was used by a suspect to transport and conceal firearms.

== Sports ==
The Inline Skating Club of America is a skating facility that is the home of the New Jersey Grizzlies of the Professional Inline Hockey Association Pro Division and the Wallington Grizzlies of the Professional Inline Hockey Association Minor League.

North Arlington offers an extensive public athletic/recreation program for youth, offering a boys and girls basketball leagues, a recreation bowling league, a girls softball league, little league baseball, a soccer association, and a popular football and cheerleading program, the "Junior Vikings", named after the North Arlington High School "Vikings". Additionally, to meet the needs of a growing population of children with special needs, North Arlington recreation offers "Recreation for Developmentally Challenged Children". This program includes cooperation from neighboring towns, and consists of Spring baseball and soccer. The recreation program serves adults with an adult men's basketball league as well as an adult women's volleyball program.

== Parks and recreation ==
Riverside County Park is a Bergen County Park covering 85 acres (34 ha), located on River Road between Lyndhurst and North Arlington. It has a playground, athletic fields, tennis courts, a Bocce ball court and fitness center.

== Government ==
=== Local government ===
North Arlington is governed under the borough form of New Jersey municipal government, which is used in 218 municipalities (of the 564) statewide, making it the most common form of government in New Jersey. The governing body is comprised of a mayor and a borough council, with all positions elected at-large on a partisan basis as part of the November general election. A mayor is elected directly by the voters to a four-year term of office. The borough council includes six members elected to serve three-year terms on a staggered basis, with two seats coming up for election each year in a three-year cycle. The borough form of government used by North Arlington is a "weak mayor / strong council" government in which council members act as the legislative body with the mayor presiding at meetings and voting only in the event of a tie. The mayor can veto ordinances subject to an override by a two-thirds majority vote of the council. The mayor makes committee and liaison assignments for council members, and most appointments are made by the mayor with the advice and consent of the council.

As of 2023, the mayor of North Arlington is Republican Daniel H. Pronti, whose term of office ends December 31, 2026. Pronti, who won the 2018 mayoral election, replaced Joseph P. Bianchi on the ballot, following Bianchi's death on October 10, 2018; Bianchi, a volunteer firefighter in the borough, who responded to Ground Zero after the September 11 terror attacks, died of cancer he initially contracted at the site. Members of the North Arlington Borough Council are Council President Mario L. Karcic Jr. (R, 2026), Council Vice President Kirk Del Russo (R, 2028), Donna Bocchino (R, 2026), Amanda DeCicco(R, 2028), Brian A. Fitzhenry (R, 2027) and Allison C. Sheedy (R, 2027).

In October 2025, the borough council selected Amanda DeCicco from a list of three candidates nominated by the Republican municipal committee to fill the council seat that was vacated by Lynette Cavadas.

In January 2019, Kirk DelRusso was unanimously selected from a list of three candidates nominated by the Republican municipal committee to fill the seat expiring in December 2020 that became vacant when Daniel H. Pronti was sworn in to the mayor's position.

In January 2015, the borough council selected Brian Fitzhenry from a list of three candidates nominated by the Republican municipal committee to fill the council seat that was vacated by Joseph Bianchi when he took office as mayor; Fitzhenry would serve on an interim basis until the November 2015 election. Republicans swept the November 2015 general election, giving the party full control of municipal government. Brian Fitzhenry and Allison Sheedy were elected to full three-year terms, while Mario Karcic Jr., was elected to fill the balance of Joseph Bianchi's council seat expiring in 2016.

Peter Norcia was appointed in February 2013 to fill the vacant seat of Steve Tanelli, who won a seat on the Board of Chosen Freeholders.

List of mayors of North Arlington
#	Name	Term length	Party
1	George Bayliss*	April 28, 1896 - July, 1909	Republican
2	William Brandenburg Jr.	July, 1909 - December 31, 1919	Democrat
3	Harry McKinlay	January 1, 1920 - December 31, 1921	Republican
4	Alfred F. Barnard	January 1, 1922 - December 31, 1930	Republican
5	Daniel Rentschler	January 1, 1931 - December 31, 1936	Republican
6	Alexander Allan	January 1, 1937 - December 31, 1944	Republican
7	John R. Manson	January 1, 1945 - December 31, 1946	Unknown
8	Louis E. Gaeckle	January 1, 1947 - December 31, 1950	Unknown
9	Walter J. O'Connell	January 1, 1951 - December 31, 1954	Unknown
10	Leonard Barnett**	January 1, 1955 - May, 1956	Democrat
11	Peter R. Tonner	May, 1956 - December 31, 1964	Democrat
12	William D. McDowell	January 1, 1965 - December 31, 1968	Republican
13	Theodore R. Lapinski	January 1, 1969 - December 31, 1970	Republican
14	Edward J. Slodowski	January 1, 1971 - December 31, 1974	Democrat
15	Ernest T. Cerone	January 1, 1975 - December 31, 1978	Republican
16	Edward Martone	January 1, 1979 - December 31, 1982	Democrat
17	Leonard R. Kaiser	January 1, 1983 - December 31, 2002	Republican
18	Russell L. Pitman	January 1, 2003 - December 31, 2006	Democrat
19	Peter Massa	January 1, 2007 - December 31, 2013	Democrat
20	Joseph Bianchi***	January 1, 2014 - October 10, 2018	Republican
21	Daniel H. Pronti	January 1, 2019 - currently serving	Republican

*Resigned in July of 1909, Councilman Brandenburg elected to succeed him

**Resigned in May of 1956 to move to Florida for business reasons, Councilman Tonner elected to succeed him

***Passed away while serving in office, council did not select a new mayor immediately, Pronti elected via mayoral race

=== Federal, state and county representation ===
North Arlington is located in the 9th Congressional District and is part of New Jersey's 36th state legislative district.

For the 119th United States Congress, New Jersey's 9th congressional district is represented by Nellie Pou (D, North Haledon) New Jersey is represented in the United States Senate by Democrats Cory Booker (Newark, term ends 2027) and Andy Kim (Moorestown, term ends 2031).

For the 2026–2027 session, the 36th legislative district of the New Jersey Legislature is represented in the State Senate by Paul Sarlo (D, Wood-Ridge) and in the General Assembly by Clinton Calabrese (D, Cliffside Park) and Gary Schaer (D, Passaic).

Bergen County is governed by a directly elected County Executive, with legislative functions performed by a Board of County Commissioners comprised of seven members who are elected at-large to three-year terms in partisan elections on a staggered basis, with either two or three seats coming up for election each November; a Chairman and Vice Chairman are selected from among its seven members at a reorganization meeting held every January. As of 2025, the county executive is James J. Tedesco III (D, Paramus), whose four-year term of office ends December 31, 2026.

Bergen County's Commissioners are Chair Mary J. Amoroso (D, Mahwah, 2025), Vice Chair Steven A. Tanelli (D, North Arlington, 2027), Chair Pro Tem Joan Voss (D, Fort Lee, 2026), Rafael Marte (D, Bergenfield, 2026), Germaine M. Ortiz (D, Emerson, 2025), Thomas J. Sullivan Jr. (D, Montvale, 2025) and Tracy Silna Zur (D, Franklin Lakes, 2027).

Bergen County's elected constitutional officials are Clerk John S. Hogan (D, Northvale, 2026), Sheriff Anthony Cureton (D, Englewood, 2027) and Surrogate Michael R. Dressler (D, Cresskill, 2026).

=== Politics ===
United States presidential election results for North Arlington 2024 2020 2016 2012 2008 2004
Year	Republican		Democratic		Third party(ies)	
Year	No.	%	No.	%	No.	%
2024	4,195	56.19%	3,163	42.37%	108	1.45%
2020	4,053	49.41%	4,048	49.35%	101	1.23%
2016	3,392	48.64%	3,351	48.05%	231	3.31%
2012	2,703	41.82%	3,706	57.33%	55	0.85%
2008	3,500	49.79%	3,454	49.13%	76	1.08%
2004	3,376	49.67%	3,370	49.58%	51	0.75%

As of March 2011, there were a total of 8,594 registered voters in North Arlington, of which 2,839 (33.0% vs. 31.7% countywide) were registered as Democrats, 1,603 (18.7% vs. 21.1%) were registered as Republicans and 4,146 (48.2% vs. 47.1%) were registered as Unaffiliated. There were 6 voters registered as Libertarians or Greens. Among the borough's 2010 Census population, 55.8% (vs. 57.1% in Bergen County) were registered to vote, including 67.8% of those ages 18 and over (vs. 73.7% countywide).

In the 2016 presidential election, Republican Donald Trump received 3,392 votes (48.4% vs. 41.1% countywide), ahead of Democrat Hillary Clinton with 3,351 votes (47.8% vs. 54.2%) and other candidates with 269 votes (3.8% vs. 4.6%), among the 7,097 ballots cast by the borough's 9,594 registered voters, for a turnout of 74.0% (vs. 72.5% in Bergen County). In the 2012 presidential election, Democrat Barack Obama received 3,706 votes (56.7% vs. 54.8% countywide), ahead of Republican Mitt Romney with 2,703 votes (41.3% vs. 43.5%) and other candidates with 55 votes (0.8% vs. 0.9%), among the 6,541 ballots cast by the borough's 9,138 registered voters, for a turnout of 71.6% (vs. 70.4% in Bergen County). In the 2008 presidential election, Republican John McCain received 3,500 votes (49.1% vs. 44.5% countywide), ahead of Democrat Barack Obama with 3,454 votes (48.5% vs. 53.9%) and other candidates with 76 votes (1.1% vs. 0.8%), among the 7,124 ballots cast by the borough's 9,317 registered voters, for a turnout of 76.5% (vs. 76.8% in Bergen County). In the 2004 presidential election, Republican George W. Bush received 3,376 votes (49.3% vs. 47.2% countywide), ahead of Democrat John Kerry with 3,370 votes (49.2% vs. 51.7%) and other candidates with 51 votes (0.7% vs. 0.7%), among the 6,847 ballots cast by the borough's 9,072 registered voters, for a turnout of 75.5% (vs. 76.9% in the whole county).

Gubernatorial election results for North Arlington
Year	Republican		Democratic		Third party(ies)	
Year	No.	%	No.	%	No.	%
2025	2,748	49.58%	2,784	50.23%	11	0.20%
2021	2,547	55.90%	1,978	43.42%	31	0.68%
2017	1,741	47.96%	1,824	50.25%	65	1.79%
2013	2,477	60.00%	1,613	39.07%	38	0.92%
2009	2,131	48.33%	1,953	44.30%	325	7.37%
2005	1,785	40.19%	2,489	56.05%	167	3.76%

In the 2013 gubernatorial election, Republican Chris Christie received 60.0% of the vote (2,477 cast), ahead of Democrat Barbara Buono with 39.1% (1,613 votes), and other candidates with 0.9% (38 votes), among the 4,256 ballots cast by the borough's 8,783 registered voters (128 ballots were spoiled), for a turnout of 48.5%. In the 2009 gubernatorial election, Republican Chris Christie received 2,131 votes (47.6% vs. 45.8% countywide), ahead of Democrat Jon Corzine with 1,953 votes (43.6% vs. 48.0%), Independent Chris Daggett with 295 votes (6.6% vs. 4.7%) and other candidates with 30 votes (0.7% vs. 0.5%), among the 4,476 ballots cast by the borough's 8,940 registered voters, yielding a 50.1% turnout (vs. 50.0% in the county).

United States Senate election results for North Arlington1
Year	Republican		Democratic		Third party(ies)	
Year	No.	%	No.	%	No.	%
2024	3,708	53.93%	3,013	43.82%	155	2.25%
2018	2,469	47.87%	2,527	48.99%	162	3.14%
2012	2,279	38.35%	3,565	59.99%	99	1.67%
2006	2,081	46.51%	2,321	51.88%	72	1.61%

United States Senate election results for North Arlington2
Year	Republican		Democratic		Third party(ies)	
Year	No.	%	No.	%	No.	%
2020	3,682	46.43%	4,077	51.41%	172	2.17%
2014	1,791	45.78%	2,023	51.71%	98	2.51%
2013	1,125	47.89%	1,193	50.79%	31	1.32%
2008	2,796	44.71%	3,384	54.12%	73	1.17%

== Education ==
Students in pre-kindergarten through twelfth grade are educated by the North Arlington School District. As of the 2018–19 school year, the district, comprised of five schools, had an enrollment of 1,869 students and 135.1 classroom teachers (on an FTE basis), for a student–teacher ratio of 13.8:1. Schools in the district (with 2018–19 school enrollment data from the National Center for Education Statistics) are Thomas Jefferson Elementary School with 298 students in grades K–5, Franklin Roosevelt Elementary School with 226 students in grades K–5, George Washington Elementary School with 357 students in grades K–5, North Arlington Middle School with 422 students in grades 6–8 and North Arlington High School with 532 students in grades 9–12. In 2010, Roosevelt Elementary School was recognized with the National Blue Ribbon Schools Award of Excellence by the United States Department of Education.

In the 1970s and 1980s, declining enrollment led North Arlington to be one of the few school districts in the state that featured involuntary "combined classes" whereby classes at their Roosevelt School for grades 4 and 5 and for grades 6 and 7 were combined into a single classroom with a single teacher for each pair of grades.

Public school students from the borough, and all of Bergen County, are eligible to attend the secondary education programs offered by the Bergen County Technical Schools, which include the Bergen County Academies in Hackensack, Applied Technology High School on Bergen Community College Campus, and the Bergen Tech campus in Teterboro or Paramus. The district offers programs on a shared-time or full-time basis, with admission based on a selective application process and tuition covered by the student's home school district.

Queen of Peace, a Roman Catholic parish, operates a parochial school, Queen of Peace Elementary School, which was founded in 1923 and serves Pre-K to 8th grade, under the auspices of Roman Catholic Archdiocese of Newark. Queen of Peace High School, which served 9th–12th grades and was founded in 1930, closed after the 2016–17 school year. Despite a fundraising campaign that raised $1 million, in May 2017, the Archdiocese of Newark announced the closing of the high school as of June 30, 2017, in the wake of sharply dropping enrollment and financial challenges, though the affiliated K–8 grammar school remained open.

== Emergency services ==
=== Police ===
The North Arlington Police Department (NAPD) protects and services the citizens of North Arlington. Chief Michael Horton was sworn in as Chief of Police in July 2024, overseeing a police department that consists of 34 men and women. NAPD serves the residents in many roles which include Patrol, Detective Bureau, Special Operations Unit, Motorcycle Unit, and School resource officers.The North Arlington Police Department is located at 214 Ridge Road.

=== Fire ===
The North Arlington Fire Department (NAFD) is an all-volunteer fire department organized in 1910. The department is staffed by 80 fully trained firefighters. There are three separate firehouses. The three separate firehouses are manned by three fire companies: Hose Company 1 (established in 1910), Schuyler Engine Company 2 (established in 1916), and Eagle Truck Company 3 (established in 1923).

Apparatus

- Stationed at Company 1: Engine 1 and Special Service Unit 39-SSU
- Stationed at Company 2: Engine 2 and Engine 6
- Stationed at Company 3: Ladder 3 and Rescue 5

Chiefs

- 39-00 – Chief John Nichols
- 39-10 – Assistant Chief Brian Heinzman
- 39-20 – Deputy Chief Thomas Kropp

=== Ambulance ===
The North Arlington Volunteer Emergency Squad works with a paid staff Monday thru Friday 6am - 6pm and volunteer staff from 6pm to 6am Monday through Friday and day and night Saturday and Sunday.

The North Arlington Volunteer Emergency Squad (NAVES), was founded on June 2, 1972. The squad consists of 55 members(2018) ranging in ages from 16 to 58 years of age. NAVES currently operates four ambulances and a First Responder/ Command Vehicle. Operations Staff consists of a captain and three lieutenants. There is a crew chief on each tour that reports to a lieutenant. Executive board staff Consists of president, vice president, treasurer, secretary, and two trustees. NAVES has a youth squad and a growing auxiliary which assist in non-riding functions such as fundraising and administrative duties.

== Transportation ==
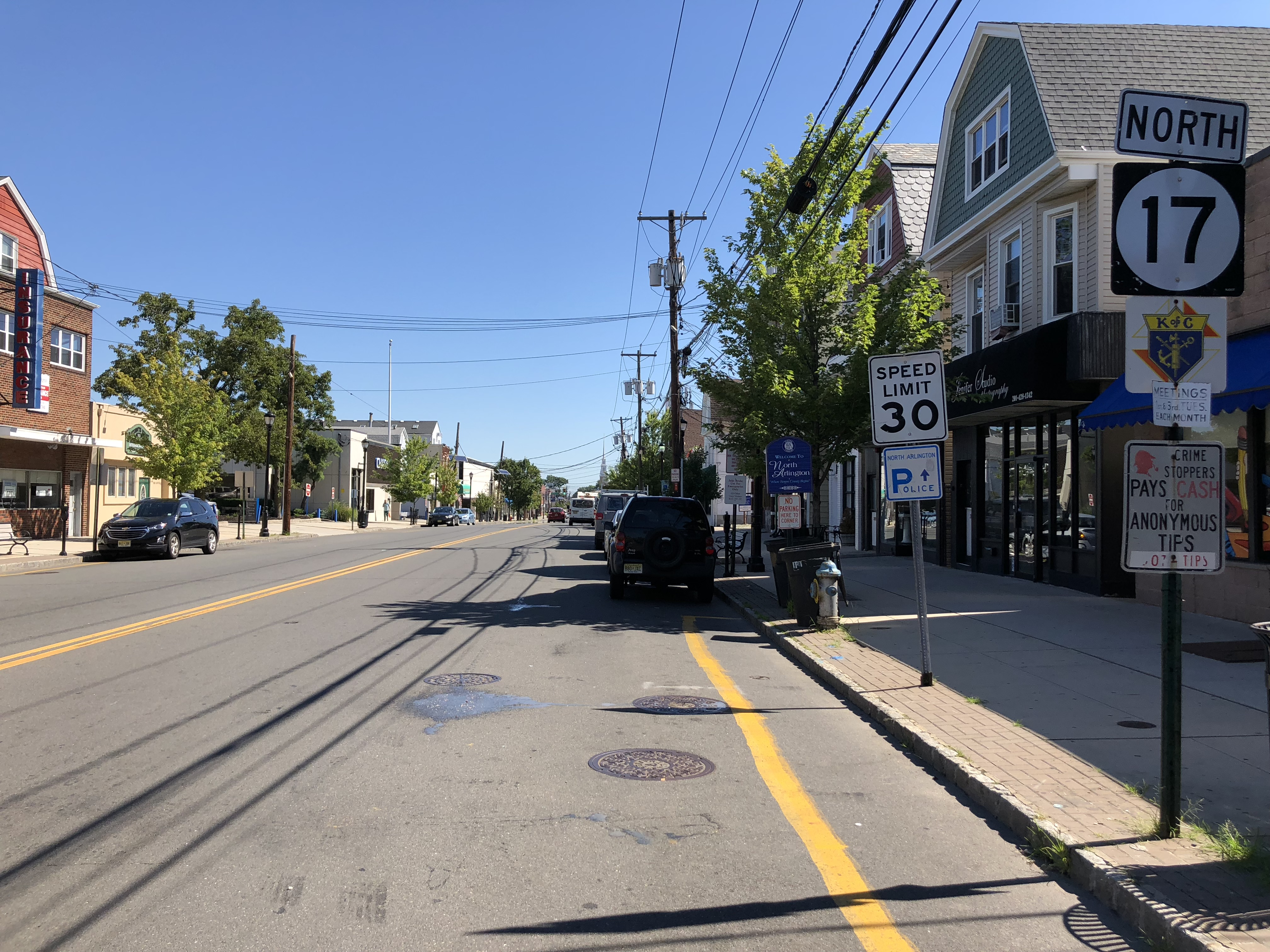
View north along Route 17 in North Arlington

=== Roads and highways ===
As of May 2010, the borough had a total of 31.14 miles (50.11 km) of roadways, of which 25.90 miles (41.68 km) were maintained by the municipality, 3.06 miles (4.92 km) by Bergen County and 2.18 miles (3.51 km) by the New Jersey Department of Transportation.

Route 7 and Route 17 meet at the intersection of Ridge Road (Route 17) and Belleville Turnpike (Route 7), the latter of which crosses the Passaic River on the Belleville Turnpike Bridge. The bridge, also known as the Rutgers Street Bridge, connects the borough to Belleville in Essex County. The bridge was formally renamed on July 4, 2013, as the "Lance Corporal Osbrany Montes de Oca Memorial Bridge" in memory of a United States Marine Corps infantryman from North Arlington who was killed in February 2012 while serving in Afghanistan.

=== Public transportation ===
NJ Transit bus routes 30, 40 and 76 provide service to and from Newark.

== Notable people ==
People who were born in, residents of, or otherwise closely associated with North Arlington include:

- Heinrich Gebhard (1878–1963), pianist, composer and piano teacher
- Derek Jeter (born 1974), shortstop who played his entire career for the New York Yankees
- William D. McDowell (1927–2007), politician who served as Bergen County's first County Executive and had been Mayor of North Arlington
- Diane Ruggiero (born 1969), screenwriter for Veronica Mars
- Frank Sowinski, former professional basketball player.
- James Thomas, guitarist and composer, of the San Francisco psychedelic instrumental band The Mermen
- James Zadroga (1971–2006), NYPD officer, participant in the cleanup after the September 11 terrorist attacks and namesake of the James Zadroga 9/11 Health and Compensation Act of 2010
- Joseph Zadroga (1947–2024), advocate for first responders sickened from their time in the rubble of the World Trade Center following the September 11 terrorist attacks

== Related reading ==
- Municipal Incorporations of the State of New Jersey (according to Counties) prepared by the Division of Local Government, Department of the Treasury (New Jersey); December 1, 1958.
- Clayton, W. Woodford; and Nelson, William. History of Bergen and Passaic Counties, New Jersey, with Biographical Sketches of Many of its Pioneers and Prominent Men., Philadelphia: Everts and Peck, 1882.
- Harvey, Cornelius Burnham (ed.), Genealogical History of Hudson and Bergen Counties, New Jersey. New York: New Jersey Genealogical Publishing Co., 1900.
- Van Valen, James M. History of Bergen County, New Jersey. New York: New Jersey Publishing and Engraving Co., 1900.
- Westervelt, Frances A. (Frances Augusta), 1858–1942, History of Bergen County, New Jersey, 1630–1923, Lewis Historical Publishing Company, 1923.
