= Albany Municipal Airport (Oregon) =

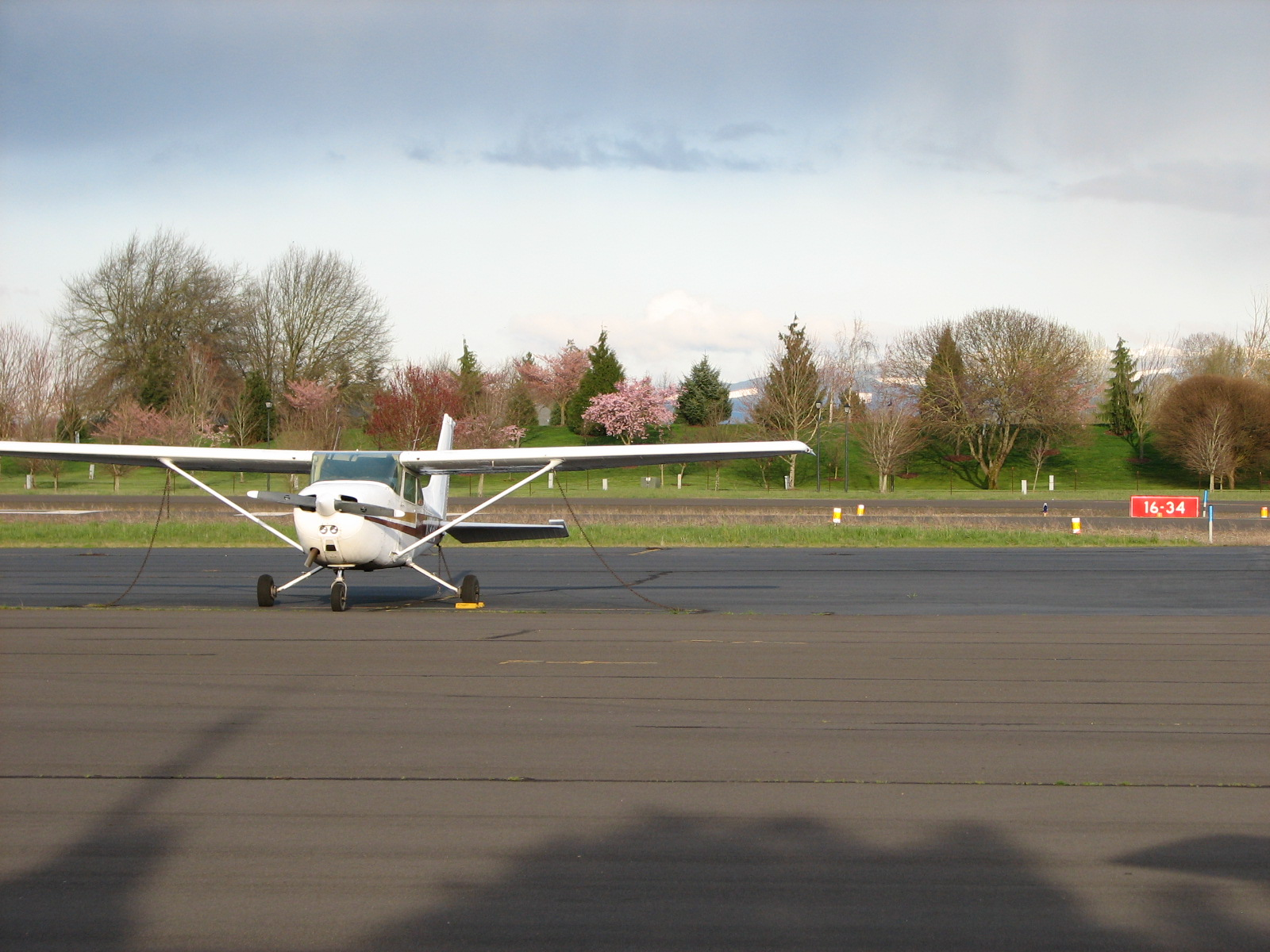
- IATA: none; ICAO: none; FAA LID: S12

Summary
- Airport type: Public
- Owner: City of Albany
- Serves: Albany, Oregon
- Elevation AMSL: 226 ft (69 m)
- Coordinates: 44°38′16″N 123°03′34″W
- Interactive map of Albany Municipal Airport

Runways
Direction	Length		Surface
Direction	ft	m	Surface
16/34	3,004	916	Asphalt
- Source: Federal Aviation Administration

- Albany Municipal Airport Historic District
- U.S. National Register of Historic Places
- U.S. Historic district
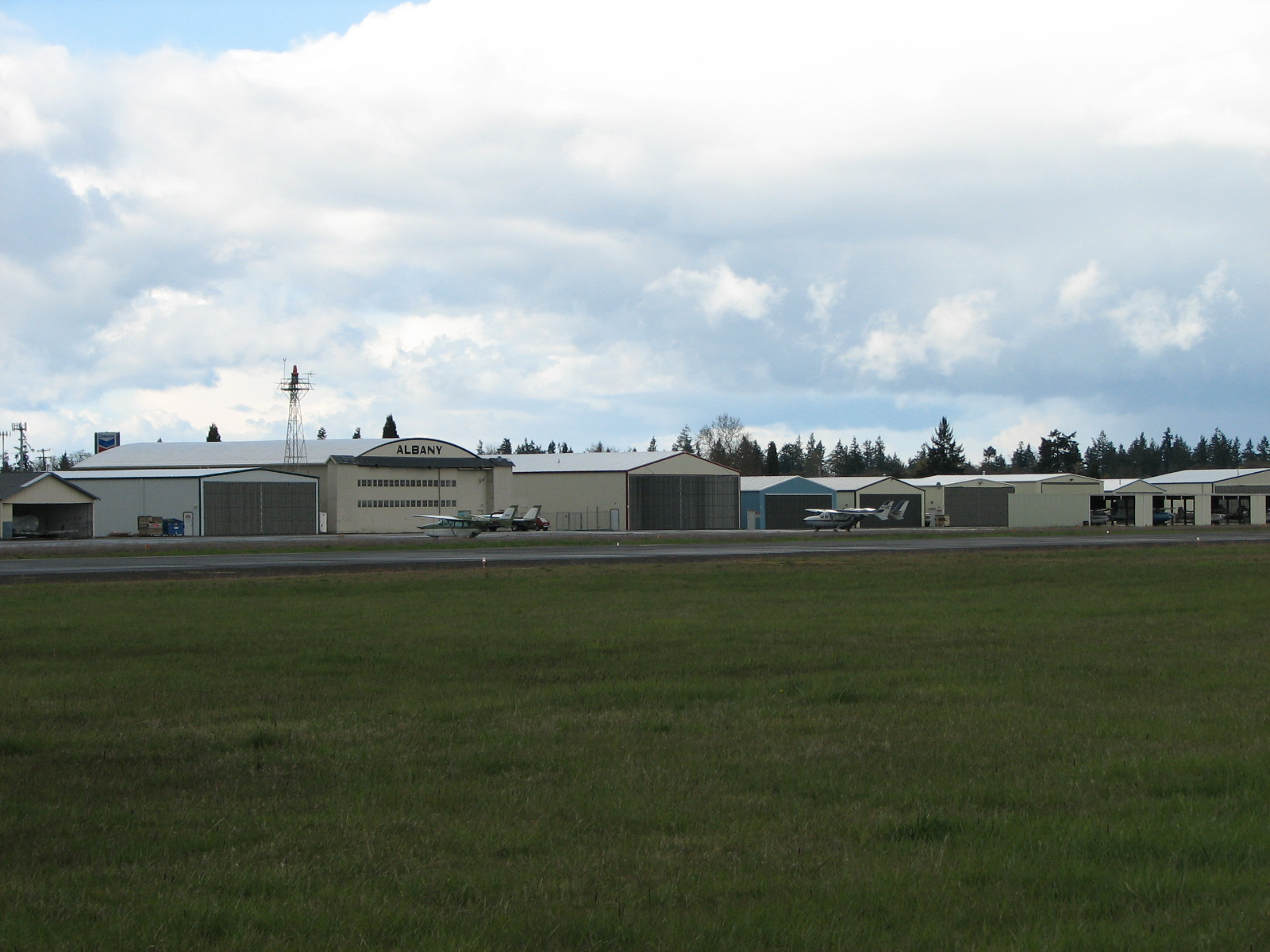
- Location: Albany, Oregon
- Area: 588 acres (238 ha)
- Built: 1929
- Architect: Cleo H. Jenkins
- NRHP reference No.: 98000630
- Added to NRHP: June 3, 1998

Albany Municipal Airport (FAA LID: S12) is a general aviation and limited commercial service aviation airport located 3 nautical miles (6 km) east of the city of Albany in Linn County, Oregon, United States. It is publicly owned and operated by the City of Albany. It is the oldest known operating airfield in Oregon, having opened in 1920.

There are 58 aircraft based at the municipal airport; 49 single engine airplanes, 7 multi-engine, and 2 jet airplanes. On average there are 62 aircraft operations per day.

== History ==
- The airport was first opened to the public in 1920 by private owners.
- In 1929 the City of Albany bought the property and named it the Albany Municipal Airport.
- A 1931 airshow inspired the Northwest Art and Air Festival.
- A jet first landed in Albany in 1964.
- In 1998, Albany Municipal Airport became the first airport in Oregon to be listed on the National Register of Historic Places (as the Albany Municipal Airport Historic District).

== Airlines and destinations ==
=== Cargo ===
- Ameriflight (Portland)
- FedEx Express
  - FedEx Feeder operated by Empire Airlines (Portland)

== See also ==
- Albany Airport (disambiguation)
