= Albany Municipal Airport (Missouri) =

- IATA: none; ICAO: none; FAA LID: K19

Summary
- Airport type: Public
- Owner: City of Albany
- Serves: Albany, Missouri
- Elevation AMSL: 886 ft (270 m)
- Coordinates: 40°15′44″N 094°20′20″W
- Interactive map of Albany Municipal Airport

Runways
Direction	Length		Surface
Direction	ft	m	Surface
1/19	3,300	1,006	Concrete

Statistics (2009)
- Aircraft operations: 3,280
- Based aircraft: 8
- Source: Federal Aviation Administration

Albany Municipal Airport (FAA LID: K19) is a city-owned public-use airport located one nautical mile (1.85 km) north of the central business district of Albany, a city in Gentry County, Missouri, United States.

== Facilities and aircraft ==
Albany Municipal Airport covers an area of 120 acres (49 ha) at an elevation of 886 feet (270 m) above mean sea level. It has one runway designated 1/19 with a concrete surface measuring 3,300 by 50 feet (1,006 x 15 m).

For the 12-month period ending May 31, 2009, the airport had 3,280 aircraft operations, an average of 273 per month: 99.7% general aviation and 0.3% military. At that time there were 8 aircraft based at this airport: 87.5% single-engine and 12.5% multi-engine.

== See also ==
- List of airports in Missouri
