= Albany, Texas =

- City
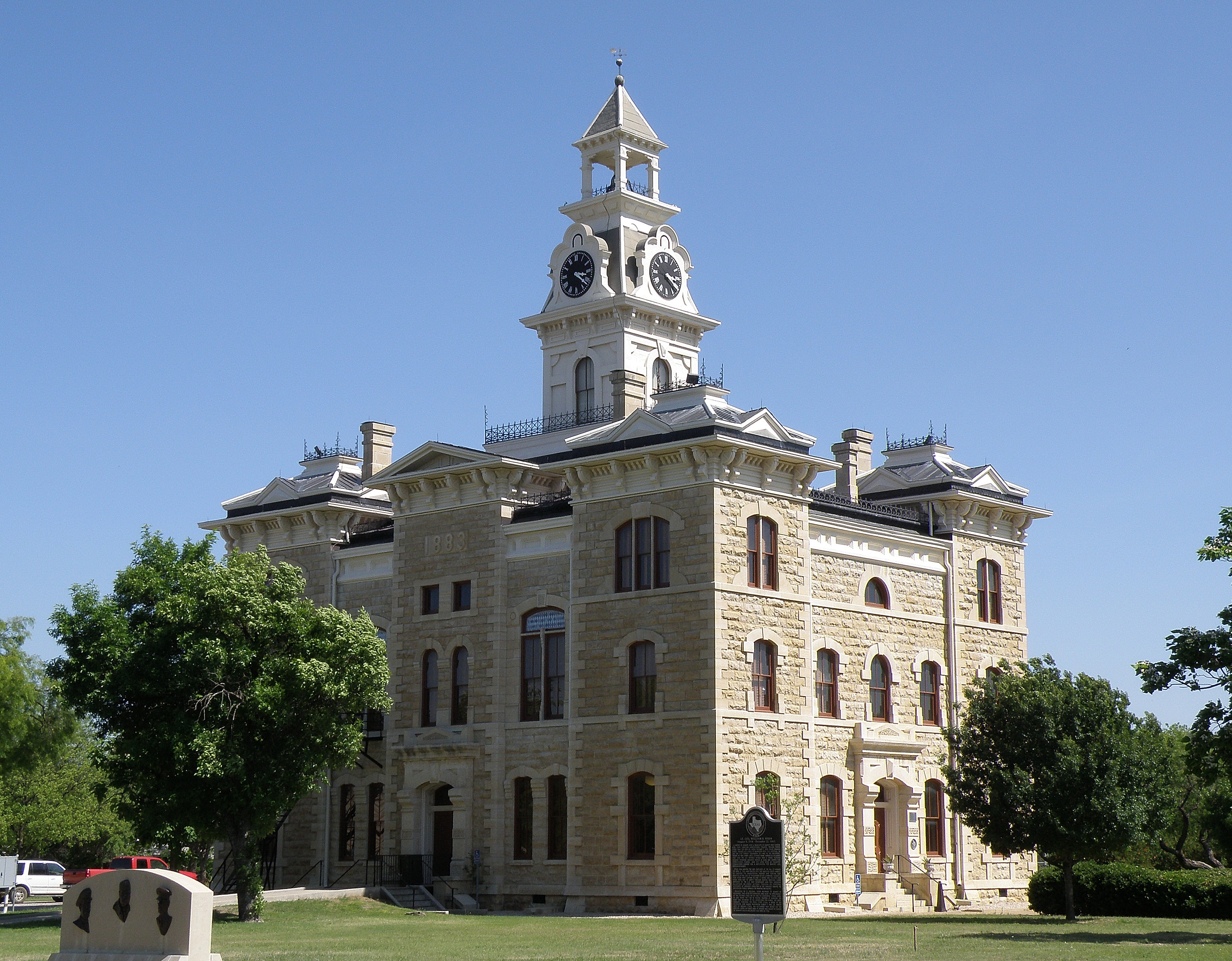
- Shackelford County Courthouse
- Motto: Home of the Hereford
- Interactive map of Albany, Texas
- Coordinates: 32°43′38″N 99°17′44″W
- Country: United States
- State: Texas
- County: Shackelford

Area
  - Total: 1.57 sq mi (4.06 km^{2})
  - Land: 1.57 sq mi (4.06 km^{2})
  - Water: 0 sq mi (0.00 km^{2})
- Elevation: 1,424 ft (434 m)

Population (2020)
  - Total: 1,854
  - Density: 1,182.7/sq mi (456.65/km^{2})
- Time zone: UTC-6 (Central (CST))
  - Summer (DST): UTC-5 (CDT)
- ZIP code: 76430
- Area code: 325
- FIPS code: 48-01648
- GNIS feature ID: 2409676
- Website: https://albany-texas.org/

Albany is a city in Shackelford County, Texas, United States. Its population was 1,854 at the 2020 Census. It is the county seat of Shackelford County.

== History ==
Established in 1873, Albany was named by county clerk William Cruger after his former home of Albany, Georgia.

Lieutenant Colonel William Dyess, survivor of the Bataan Death March in the Philippines and namesake of Dyess Air Force Base, was born in Albany on August 9, 1916.

Major General Robert B. Williams, who led the World War II aerial bombing raid on Schweinfurt, Germany, was born in Albany on November 9, 1901.

== Geography ==
Albany is located northeast of Abilene, the seat of Taylor County.

According to the United States Census Bureau, the city has a total area of 1.5 square miles (3.8 km^{2}), all land.

=== Climate ===
Climate data for Albany, Texas (1991–2020 normals, extremes 1901–present)
Month	Jan	Feb	Mar	Apr	May	Jun	Jul	Aug	Sep	Oct	Nov	Dec	Year
Record high °F (°C)	92 (33)	96 (36)	101 (38)	103 (39)	113 (45)	115 (46)	114 (46)	114 (46)	111 (44)	104 (40)	94 (34)	91 (33)	115 (46)
Mean daily maximum °F (°C)	56.9 (13.8)	60.8 (16.0)	68.7 (20.4)	77.0 (25.0)	83.9 (28.8)	90.7 (32.6)	94.7 (34.8)	94.9 (34.9)	87.3 (30.7)	78.2 (25.7)	66.7 (19.3)	57.9 (14.4)	76.5 (24.7)
Daily mean °F (°C)	44.2 (6.8)	47.9 (8.8)	55.5 (13.1)	63.5 (17.5)	72.0 (22.2)	79.5 (26.4)	83.2 (28.4)	82.7 (28.2)	75.2 (24.0)	65.2 (18.4)	54.2 (12.3)	45.6 (7.6)	64.1 (17.8)
Mean daily minimum °F (°C)	31.5 (−0.3)	35.0 (1.7)	42.2 (5.7)	49.9 (9.9)	60.1 (15.6)	68.3 (20.2)	71.8 (22.1)	70.5 (21.4)	63.1 (17.3)	52.3 (11.3)	41.7 (5.4)	33.3 (0.7)	51.6 (10.9)
Record low °F (°C)	−8 (−22)	−7 (−22)	3 (−16)	19 (−7)	32 (0)	44 (7)	48 (9)	44 (7)	33 (1)	19 (−7)	7 (−14)	−6 (−21)	−8 (−22)
Average precipitation inches (mm)	1.22 (31)	1.73 (44)	2.36 (60)	2.81 (71)	3.39 (86)	3.87 (98)	2.27 (58)	2.11 (54)	2.97 (75)	2.72 (69)	1.93 (49)	1.54 (39)	28.92 (735)
Average snowfall inches (cm)	0.9 (2.3)	0.4 (1.0)	0.0 (0.0)	0.1 (0.25)	0.0 (0.0)	0.0 (0.0)	0.0 (0.0)	0.0 (0.0)	0.0 (0.0)	0.0 (0.0)	0.3 (0.76)	0.6 (1.5)	2.3 (5.8)
Average precipitation days (≥ 0.01 in)	3.6	4.1	5.5	4.4	7.1	6.3	4.6	4.9	5.4	5.0	4.3	4.1	59.3
Average snowy days (≥ 0.1 in)	0.3	0.4	0.0	0.0	0.0	0.0	0.0	0.0	0.0	0.0	0.2	0.3	1.2
Source: NOAA

== Demographics ==
Historical population
Census	Pop.	Note	%±
1880	129		—
1890	857		564.3%
1920	1,469		—
1930	2,422		64.9%
1940	2,230		−7.9%
1950	2,241		0.5%
1960	2,174		−3.0%
1970	1,978		−9.0%
1980	2,450		23.9%
1990	1,962		−19.9%
2000	1,921		−2.1%
2010	2,034		5.9%
2020	1,854		−8.8%
U.S. Decennial Census

=== 2020 census ===
As of the 2020 census, 1,854 people, 760 households, and 405 families were residing in the city. The median age was 41.9 years; 24.8% of residents were under 18 and 22.0% were 65 or older. For every 100 females, there were 86.3 males, and for every 100 females 18 and over, there were 84.0 males 18 and over.

None of the residents lived in urban areas, while 100.0% lived in rural areas.

Of those households, 30.4% had children under 18 living in them, 52.0% were married-couple households, 15.1% were households with a male householder and no spouse or partner present, and 28.9% were households with a female householder and no spouse or partner present. About 28.4% of all households were made up of individuals, and 13.7% had someone living alone who was 65 or older.

The city had 895 housing units, of which 15.1% were vacant. Among occupied housing units, 77.1% were owner-occupied and 22.9% were renter-occupied. The homeowner vacancy rate was 2.1% and the rental vacancy rate was 9.8%.

Racial composition as of the 2020 census
Race	Percentage
White	86.6%
Black or African American	0.7%
American Indian and Alaska Native	0.4%
Asian	0.5%
Some other race	5.7%
Two or more races	6.1%
Hispanic or Latino (of any race)	14.0%

=== 2000 census ===
As of the 2000 census, 1,921 people, 746 households, and 531 families resided in the city. The population density was 1,305.9 inhabitants per square mile (504.2/km^{2}). The 880 housing units averaged 598.2 per square mile (231.1/km^{2}). The racial makeup of the city was 93.13% White, 0.68% African American, 0.47% Native American, 4.84% from other races, and 0.88% from two or more races. Hispanics or Latinos of any race were 8.07% of the population.

Of the 746 households, 33.1% had children under 18 living with them, 59.1% were married couples living together, 8.7% had a female householder with no husband present, and 28.7% were not families. Of all households, 27.3% were made up of individuals, and 16.1% had someone living alone who was 65 or older. The average household size was 2.51, and the average family size was 3.08.

In the city, the age distribution was 27.0% under 18, 6.4% from 18 to 24, 25.4% from 25 to 44, 23.0% from 45 to 64, and 18.3% who were 65 or older. The median age was 39 years. For every 100 females, there were 86.9 males. For every 100 females 18 and over, there were 83.2 males.

The median income in the city for a household was $31,563 and for a family was $40,592. Males had a median income of $28,846 versus $17,411 for females. The per capita income for the city was $17,470. About 8.1% of families and 9.2% of the population were below the poverty line, including 10.1% of those under 18 and 11.1% of those 65 or over.

== Education ==
Albany is served by the Albany Independent School District. Their mascot is the Lion and their school colors are red and white.

- Nancy Smith Elementary (prekindergarten-grade 6), a 2006 National Blue Ribbon School
- Albany Junior/Senior High School (grades 7–12)

== Transportation ==
=== Highways ===
- U.S. Route 180
- U.S. Route 283
- Texas State Highway 6
- Farm to Market 601
- Farm to Market 1084

=== Air ===
Albany Municipal Airport is a city-owned, public-use airport located 2 nautical miles (3.7 km) east of the central business district.

== Fort Griffin show ==
Since 1938, Texas' oldest outdoor musical, the Fort Griffin Fandangle, has been presented during the last two weekends of June in the Prairie Theater about historic Fort Griffin, a military outpost established in 1867 near Albany and now a state park. The program, the content of which is different each year, attempts to recapture the theatrical charm of the American West.

The show offers covered wagons and buggies, a stagecoach, a replica of the first Texas Central Railroad train, an oil derrick, and cowboys whose ancestors pushed Longhorn herds up the nearby Great Western Cattle Trail. The Dallas Morning News describes the show: "as professional as a multimillion dollar Broadway musical, with sets and costumes to match, with a cast of three hundred". The Abilene Reporter-News calls the program "Frontier history served up with genuine earthiness, spiced by rare humor."

== See also ==
- Albany News
