= North Arlington High School =

High school in Bergen County, New Jersey, US

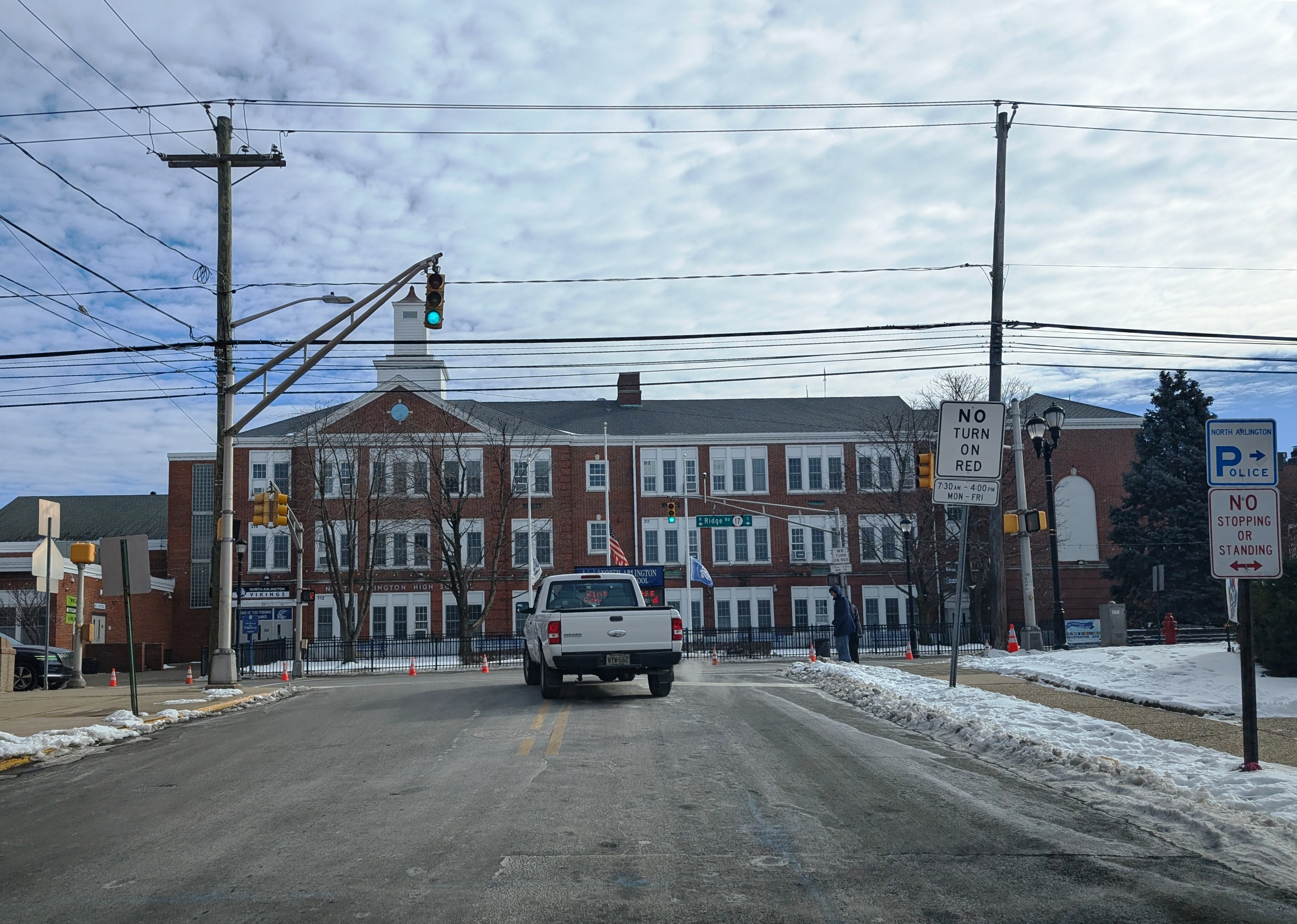

Location
- 222 Ridge Road; North Arlington, Bergen County, New Jersey 07031; United States; 40.788921°N 74.132834°W

Information
- Type: Public high school
- Motto: Pride, Loyalty, Desire
- Established: 1935
- School district: North Arlington School District
- NCES School ID: 341143000636
- Principal: Patrick D. Bott
- Faculty: 46.0 FTEs
- Enrollment: 634 (as of 2024–25)
- Student to teacher ratio: 13.8:1
- Colors: Royal blue and white
- Athletics conference: North Jersey Interscholastic Conference
- Nickname: Vikings
- Website: nahs.navikings.org

North Arlington High School is a public high school in North Arlington, Bergen County, in the U.S. state of New Jersey. It is the lone secondary school of the North Arlington School District.

As of the 2024–25 school year, the school had an enrollment of 634 students and 46.0 classroom teachers (on an FTE basis), for a student–teacher ratio of 13.8:1. There were 179 students (28.2% of enrollment) eligible for free lunch and 51 (8.0% of students) eligible for reduced-cost lunch.

== History ==
Until September 1933, high school-aged students from North Arlington attended Kearny High School. Starting with the 1933–34 school year, students leaving eighth grade began attending Hasbrouck Heights High School. By June 1934, the district had been informed that neither Kearny nor Hasbrouck Heights had capacity to host students from North Arlington. In June 1935 the district announced that it would ending its relationship with Kearny after 25 years and that for the upcoming school year seniors would be in Hasbrouck Heights while about 350 students in grades 9–11 would be at a new North Arlington High School, for which the district was seeking funding to construct an appropriate building.

== Awards, recognition and rankings ==
The school was the 196th-ranked public high school in New Jersey out of 339 schools statewide in New Jersey Monthly magazine's September 2014 cover story on the state's "Top Public High Schools", using a new ranking methodology. The school had been ranked 149th in the state of 328 schools in 2012, after being ranked 141st in 2010 out of 322 schools listed. The magazine ranked the school 198th in 2008 out of 316 schools. The school was ranked 182nd in the magazine's September 2006 issue, which surveyed 316 schools across the state.

== Athletics ==
The North Arlington High School Vikings participate in the Meadowlands Division of the North Jersey Interscholastic Conference, which is comprised of small-enrollment schools in Bergen, Hudson, Morris and Passaic counties, and was established following a reorganization of sports leagues in Northern New Jersey by the New Jersey State Interscholastic Athletic Association (NJSIAA). Prior to the realignment that took effect in the fall of 2010, North Arlington was a part of the Bergen County Scholastic League's National division. With 385 students in grades 10-12, the school was classified by the NJSIAA for the 2019–20 school year as Group I for most athletic competition purposes, which included schools with an enrollment of 75 to 476 students in that grade range. The school was classified by the NJSIAA as Group I North for football for 2024–2026, which included schools with 254 to 474 students.

The school participates in a joint cooperative boys / girls swimming and wrestling teams with Lyndhurst High School as the host school / lead agency. North Arlington and Secaucus High School participate in a joint ice hockey team, in which Kearny High School is the host school. These co-op programs operate under agreements scheduled to expire at the end of the 2023–24 school year.

The school's nickname is the Vikings, and the school colors are royal blue and white. The school's athletic rivals are Lyndhurst High School and Harrison High School. The school offers many boys' and girls' athletic programs that include:

- Fall: volleyball, football, boys' and girls' soccer, cheerleading, cross country,^{1} marching band
- Winter: boys' and girls' basketball, cheerleading, boys’ and girls’ bowling, hockey (co-op with Kearny), swimming,^{1} wrestling^{1}
- Spring: baseball, golf, softball, rowing crew, and boys' and girls' track

Note:

^1combined with Lyndhurst High School

The boys' basketball team won the Group I state championship in 1953 (defeating Riverside High School in the tournament final), 1956 (vs. Bordentown Regional High School) and 1957 (vs. Wildwood High School). The 1953 team finished the season with a record of 18-5 after winning the Group I title with a 66-60 win against Riverside High School in the championship game played at the Elizbeth Armory. The 1957 won the Group I championship game with a 68-39 win against Wildwood at Dillon Gymnasium of Princeton University.

The 2001 girls' basketball team won the North I Group I state sectional championship over Bogota High School by a final score of 49-48.

The girls' volleyball team won the Group I state championship in 2004 (against runner-up Bogota High School).

The boys bowling team won the Group I state championship in 2019.

== Notable alumni ==
- Joseph Zadroga (1947–2024), advocate for first responders sickened from their time in the rubble of the World Trade Center following the September 11 terrorist attacks
