= Shackelford County, Texas =

County in Texas, United States

- County
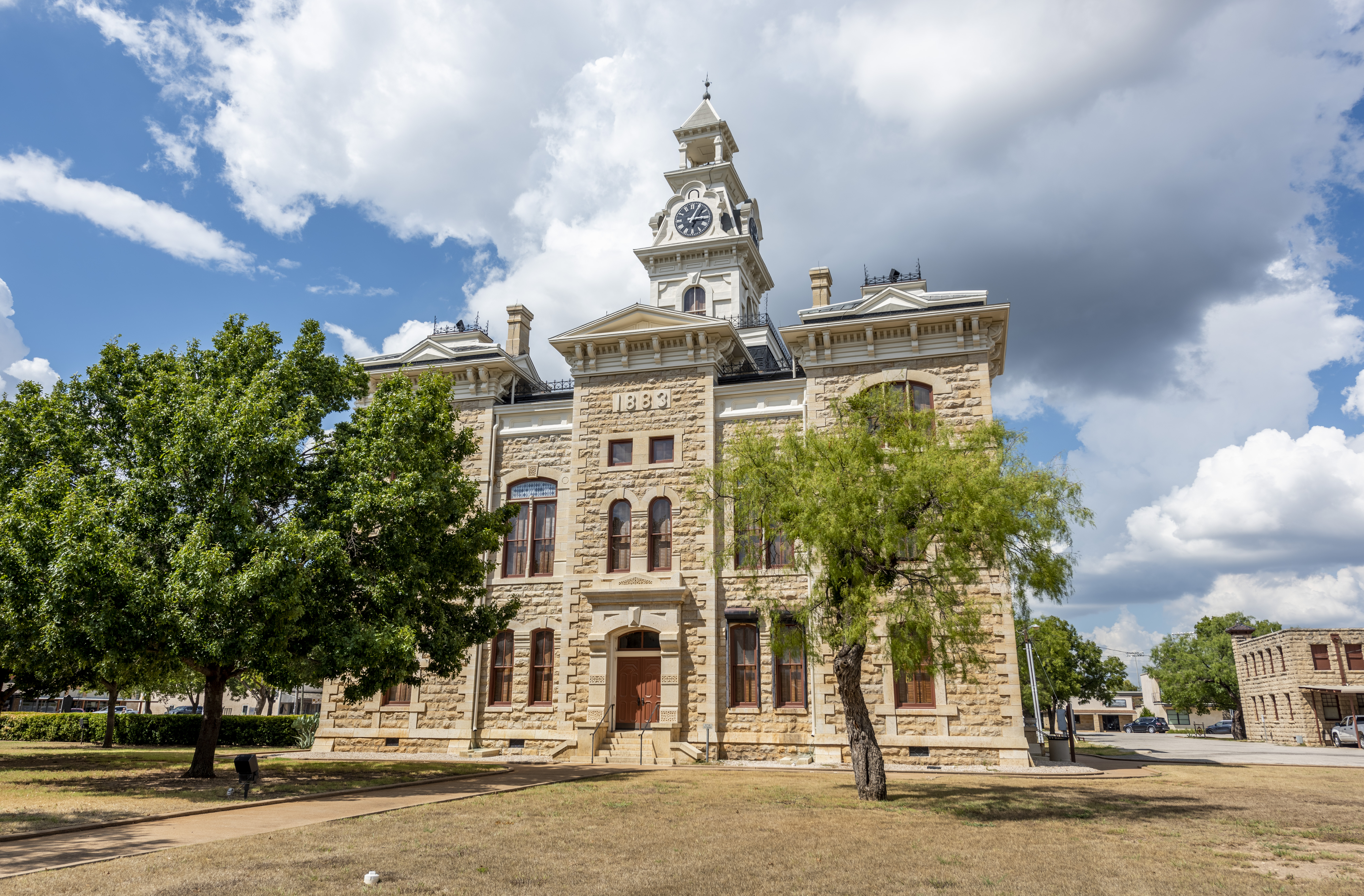
- The Shackelford County Courthouse in Albany

- Location within the U.S. state of Texas
- Coordinates: 32°44′N 99°21′W
- Country: United States
- State: Texas
- Founded: 1874
- Named for: Jack Shackelford
- Seat: Albany
- Largest city: Albany

Area
  - Total: 916 sq mi (2,370 km^{2})
  - Land: 914 sq mi (2,370 km^{2})
  - Water: 1.3 sq mi (3.4 km^{2}) 0.1%

Population (2020)
  - Total: 3,105
  - Estimate (2025): 3,197 ▲
  - Density: 3.40/sq mi (1.31/km^{2})
- Time zone: UTC−6 (Central)
  - Summer (DST): UTC−5 (CDT)
- Congressional district: 19th
- Website: www.shackelfordcounty.org

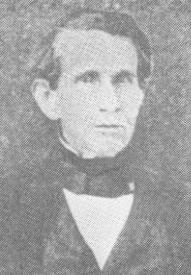
Dr. Jack Shackelford, namesake of Shackelford County

Shackelford County is a county located in the U.S. state of Texas. As of the 2020 census, its population was 3,105. Its county seat is Albany. The county was created in 1858 and later organized in 1874. Shackelford is named for Dr. Jack Shackelford, a Virginia physician who equipped soldiers at his own expense to fight in the Texas Revolution.

Historic Fort Griffin, established in 1867, lies within Shackelford County.

During the last two weekends of June, the Fort Griffin Fandangle, a Western musical production, is presented by Shackelford County residents in the Prairie Theater in Albany. The content of the program is changed each year. Begun in 1938, it is billed as "Texas' Oldest Outdoor Musical".

== Geography ==
According to the U.S. Census Bureau, the county has a total area of 916 square miles (2,370 km^{2}), of which 1.3 sq mi (3.4 km^{2}) (0.1%) is covered by water.

=== Major highways ===
- U.S. Highway 180
- U.S. Highway 283
- State Highway 6
- State Highway 351

=== Adjacent counties ===
- Throckmorton County (north)
- Stephens County (east)
- Eastland County (southeast)
- Callahan County (south)
- Jones County (west)
- Haskell County (northwest)
- Taylor County (southwest)

== Demographics ==
Historical population
Census	Pop.	Note	%±
1860	44		—
1870	455		934.1%
1880	2,037		347.7%
1890	2,012		−1.2%
1900	2,461		22.3%
1910	4,201		70.7%
1920	4,960		18.1%
1930	6,695		35.0%
1940	6,211		−7.2%
1950	5,001		−19.5%
1960	3,990		−20.2%
1970	3,323		−16.7%
1980	3,915		17.8%
1990	3,316		−15.3%
2000	3,302		−0.4%
2010	3,378		2.3%
2020	3,105		−8.1%
2025 (est.)	3,197	▲	3.0%
U.S. Decennial Census; 1850–2010 2010 2020

=== Racial and ethnic composition ===
Shackelford County, Texas – Racial and ethnic composition Note: the US Census treats Hispanic/Latino as an ethnic category. This table excludes Latinos from the racial categories and assigns them to a separate category. Hispanics/Latinos may be of any race.
Race / Ethnicity (NH = Non-Hispanic)	Pop 1980	Pop 1990	Pop 2000	Pop 2010	Pop 2020	% 1980	% 1990	% 2000	% 2010	% 2020
White alone (NH)	3,659	3,016	3,014	2,961	2,612	93.46%	90.95%	91.28%	87.66%	84.12%
Black or African American alone (NH)	30	12	9	14	20	0.77%	0.36%	0.27%	0.41%	0.64%
Native American or Alaska Native alone (NH)	6	9	13	8	6	0.15%	0.27%	0.39%	0.24%	0.19%
Asian alone (NH)	4	2	0	9	14	0.10%	0.06%	0.00%	0.27%	0.45%
Native Hawaiian or Pacific Islander alone (NH)	x	x	0	1	0	x	x	0.00%	0.03%	0.00%
Other race alone (NH)	5	5	0	2	2	0.13%	0.15%	0.00%	0.06%	0.06%
Mixed race or Multiracial (NH)	x	x	15	43	88	x	x	0.45%	1.27%	2.83%
Hispanic or Latino (any race)	211	272	251	340	363	5.39%	8.20%	7.60%	10.07%	11.69%
Total	3,915	3,316	3,302	3,378	3,105	100.00%	100.00%	100.00%	100.00%	100.00%

=== 2020 census ===
As of the 2020 census, the county had a population of 3,105. The median age was 44.7 years; 23.9% of thee residents were under 18 and 21.6% were 65 or older. For every 100 females, there were 94.7 males, and for every 100 females 18 and over, there were 89.9 males 18 and over.

The racial makeup of the county was 88.0% White, 0.7% Black or African American, 0.3% American Indian and Alaska Native, 0.6% Asian, <0.1% Native Hawaiian and Pacific Islander, 4.1% from some other race, and 6.3% from two or more races. Hispanic or Latino residents of any race comprised 11.7% of the population.

Fewer than 0.1% of residents lived in urban areas, while almost all lived in rural areas.

Of the 1,265 households in the county, 30.0% had children under 18 living in them, 55.5% were married-couple households, 15.6% were households with a male householder and no spouse or partner present, and 25.4% were households with a female householder and no spouse or partner present. About 27.2% of all households were made up of individuals, and 13.4% had someone living alone who was 65 or older.

The county had 1,570 housing units, of which 19.4% were vacant. Among occupied housing units, 77.5% were owner-occupied and 22.5% were renter-occupied. The homeowner vacancy rate was 1.7% and the rental vacancy rate was 9.5%.

=== 2000 census ===
As of the 2000 census, 3,302 people, 1,300 households, and 941 families resided in the county. The population density was 4 people per square mile (1.5 people/km^{2}). The 1,613 housing units had an average density of 2 units per square mile (0.77 units/km^{2}). The racial makeup of the county was 94.22% White, 0.48% Black or African American, 0.42% Native American, 4.24% from other races, and 0.64% from two or more races. About 7.60% of the population were Hispanics or Latinos of any race.

Of the 1,300 households, 32.8% had children under 18 living with them, 60.9% were married couples living together, 8.7% had a female householder with no husband present, and 27.6% were not families. About 26.2% of all households were made up of individuals, and 14.6% had someone living alone who was 65 or older. The average household size was 2.49, and the average family size was 3.02.

In the county, the age distribution was 26.7% under 18, 6.0% from 18 to 24, 24.8% from 25 to 44, 24.3% from 45 to 64, and 18.2% who were 65 or older. The median age was 40 years. For every 100 females, there were 90.1 males. For every 100 females 18 and over, there were 85.5 males.

The median income in the county for a household was $30,479 and for a family was $38,447. Males had a median income of $26,953 versus $19,766 for females. The per capita income for the county was $16,341. About 10.9% of families and 13.6% of the population were below the poverty line, including 15.8% of those under 18 and 16.9% of those 65 or over.

== Education ==
Shackelford County includes these school districts:

- Lueders-Avoca Independent School District
- Albany Independent School District
- Moran Independent School District

== Communities ==
- Albany (county seat)
- Lueders (mostly in Jones County)
- Moran

== See also ==
- National Register of Historic Places listings in Shackelford County, Texas
- Recorded Texas Historic Landmarks in Shackelford County

== Politics ==
Shackelford County is a strongly Republican county.

Shackelford County is located within District 68 of the Texas House of Representativesand District 10 of the Texas Senate.

United States presidential election results for Shackelford County, Texas
Year	Republican		Democratic		Third party(ies)	
Year	No.	%	No.	%	No.	%
1912	18	5.29%	246	72.35%	76	22.35%
1916	51	10.92%	378	80.94%	38	8.14%
1920	116	22.01%	342	64.90%	69	13.09%
1924	727	49.93%	729	50.07%	0	0.00%
1928	558	51.10%	533	48.81%	1	0.09%
1932	117	8.14%	1,316	91.52%	5	0.35%
1936	152	11.65%	1,153	88.35%	0	0.00%
1940	229	13.06%	1,521	86.77%	3	0.17%
1944	135	10.08%	1,007	75.21%	197	14.71%
1948	211	18.41%	892	77.84%	43	3.75%
1952	1,057	57.54%	776	42.24%	4	0.22%
1956	849	60.26%	555	39.39%	5	0.35%
1960	684	48.96%	713	51.04%	0	0.00%
1964	487	34.20%	934	65.59%	3	0.21%
1968	557	36.96%	673	44.66%	277	18.38%
1972	909	73.07%	331	26.61%	4	0.32%
1976	748	49.28%	764	50.33%	6	0.40%
1980	959	60.66%	606	38.33%	16	1.01%
1984	1,181	73.63%	415	25.87%	8	0.50%
1988	865	55.66%	681	43.82%	8	0.51%
1992	623	40.64%	484	31.57%	426	27.79%
1996	792	53.84%	502	34.13%	177	12.03%
2000	1,066	79.14%	264	19.60%	17	1.26%
2004	1,292	84.61%	229	15.00%	6	0.39%
2008	1,284	85.32%	208	13.82%	13	0.86%
2012	1,218	89.36%	131	9.61%	14	1.03%
2016	1,378	91.62%	103	6.85%	23	1.53%
2020	1,484	91.15%	130	7.99%	14	0.86%
2024	1,565	90.57%	146	8.45%	17	0.98%

United States Senate election results for Shackelford County, Texas1
Year	Republican		Democratic		Third party(ies)	
Year	No.	%	No.	%	No.	%
2024	1,520	88.73%	173	10.10%	20	1.17%

United States Senate election results for Shackelford County, Texas2
Year	Republican		Democratic		Third party(ies)	
Year	No.	%	No.	%	No.	%
2020	1,475	91.79%	115	7.16%	17	1.06%

Texas Gubernatorial election results for Shackelford County
Year	Republican		Democratic		Third party(ies)	
Year	No.	%	No.	%	No.	%
2022	1,148	92.66%	81	6.54%	10	0.81%
