= Albany Independent School District =

School district in Texas, United States

Location
- 501 S. First St. Albany, Texas ESC Region 14 USA
- Coordinates: 32.724°N 99.289°W

District information
- Type: Independent school district
- Grades: Pre-K through 12
- Superintendent: Daryl Stuard
- Schools: 2 (2009-10)
- NCES District ID: 4807680

Students and staff
- Students: 505 (2010-11)
- Teachers: 46.58 (2009-10) (on full-time equivalent (FTE) basis)
- Student–teacher ratio: 11.1 (2009-10)
- Athletic conference: UIL Class 2A Football Division II
- District mascot: Lions
- Colors: Red, White

Other information
- TEA District Accountability Rating for 2011-12: Academically Acceptable
- Website: Albany ISD

The Albany Independent School District is a school district based in Albany, Texas (USA). The district operates one high school, Albany High School.

== Finances ==
As of the 2010–2011 school year, the appraised valuation of property in the district was $300,284,000. The maintenance tax rate was $0.104 and the bond tax rate was $0.006 per $100 of appraised valuation.

== Academic achievement ==
In 2011, the school district was rated "academically acceptable" by the Texas Education Agency. Forty-nine percent of districts in Texas in 2011 received the same rating. No state accountability ratings will be given to districts in 2012. A school district in Texas can receive one of four possible rankings from the Texas Education Agency: Exemplary (the highest possible ranking), Recognized, Academically Acceptable, and Academically Unacceptable (the lowest possible ranking).

Historical district TEA accountability ratings

- 2011: Academically Acceptable
- 2010: Academically Acceptable
- 2009: Recognized
- 2008: Recognized
- 2007: Recognized
- 2006: Recognized
- 2005: Academically Acceptable
- 2004: Recognized

== Schools ==
In the 2011–2012 school year, the district had students in two schools.

- Albany Junior/Senior High (Grades 7-12)
- Nancy Smith Elementary (Grades PK-6)
  - 2006 National Blue Ribbon School

== See also ==
- List of school districts in Texas
- List of high schools in Texas
