= Albany Junior/Senior High School =

Location
- 501 E. S. First Street; Albany, Texas 76430-0188; United States; 32.7243°N 99.2890°W

Information
- School type: Public high school
- School district: Albany Independent School District
- Principal: Ezra Chambers
- Teaching staff: 22.89 (FTE)
- Grades: 7–12
- Enrollment: 236 (2023–2024)
- Student to teacher ratio: 10.31
- Colors: Red & White
- Athletics conference: UIL Class AA
- Mascot: Lion/Lady Lion
- Newspaper: The Lion's Roar
- Yearbook: The Lion
- Website: Albany High School

Albany Junior/Senior High School is a public high school located in the city of Albany, Texas, United States; it is classified as a 2A school by the UIL. It is a part of the Albany Independent School District located in central Shackelford County. In 2015, the school was rated "met standard" by the Texas Education Agency.

== Athletics ==
The Albany Lions compete in volleyball, cross-country running, football, basketball, golf, tennis, track and field, baseball, and softball.

Lions teams have won state championships in:

- Football - 1960 (1A) 1961 (1A), 2022 (2A/D2), 2023 (2A/D2)
- Boys golf - 1966 (1A)
- Girls track and field - 1991 (2A)

== Alumnus ==
William E. Dyess (1916–1943), a World War II fighter pilot and namesake of Dyess Air Force Base near Abilene, is an Alumnus of Albany High School.
