= Electra Carlin =

American art dealer and gallery owner

- Born: Electra Anne Marshall; September 28, 1912; Fort Worth, Texas
- Died: February 19, 2000 (aged 87); Fort Worth, Texas
- Spouse: Howard Lee Carlin

Electra Carlin (September 28, 1912 – February 19, 2000) was an American art dealer and gallery owner in Fort Worth, Texas. She operated Fort Worth's longest-running private art gallery, which was also the first in the area founded and operated by women.

== Early life ==
Electra Anne Marshall was born September 28, 1912, to Bert Marshall (ca. 1869-1924) and Frances E. "Fannie" Peers Marshall (1872-1955). Bert was a railroad conductor and, later, car service superintendent, from Illinois or Missouri; Fannie was a homemaker from Dallas. Born and raised in Fort Worth, she attended art exhibitions at Fort Worth Public Library as a child, but never studied art. She majored in journalism in college, attending the University of Oklahoma, Beaver College in Pennsylvania, and Washington University in St. Louis. There she met her husband, Howard Lee "H. Lee" Carlin, a native of Racine, Missouri, who served in the Navy Reserve during World War II. The Carlins lived in Washington, D.C., and Roanoke, Virginia, while H. Lee worked at the Bureau of Engraving and Printing and the National Production Authority of the Department of Commerce. In 1952, the couple relocated to Dallas, where H. Lee was killed in an accident only three weeks after their move, at the age of 41, and interred at Greenwood Cemetery.

== Career ==
After her husband's death, Electra returned to Fort Worth to live near her mother. She volunteered at The Reeder School, a noted children's theater school run by Fort Worth Circle artists Dickson and Flora Reeder, until its closure in 1958. She kept books for the nearby Gallery of Wonderful Things, on Byers Avenue in Fort Worth's west side, until 1959, when owner Terese Law Hershey moved to Houston and left Carlin the gallery. Carlin continued exhibiting art at the gallery as well as Ridglea Country Club, showing works by Fort Worth Circle-affiliated artists like Bill Bomar, Cynthia Brants, Blanche McVeigh, Edward Dickson Reeder, and Bror Alexander Utter. She renovated an old laundromat on 7th Street and moved the gallery there in 1959. In January 1960, she mounted the first exhibition of Inuit art in Texas; the Gallery of Wonderful Things was renamed "Carlin Gallery" three months later. Carlin emerged as a regional tastemaker, selling Inuit art to the Amon Carter Museum, the Museum of Fine Arts Houston, and the McNay Art Museum in San Antonio. She continued selling the work of local and Inuit artists, and spoke at an Inuit art conference at the Smithsonian in 1962. In 1963, she was appointed to the City of Fort Worth Art Commission along with Ruth Carter Stevenson. Carlin represented nationally known artists like Peter Hurd and Henriette Wyeth Hurd, the daughter of N. C. Wyeth, and showed ceramics and work by Texas artists. In 1964, she expanded the Carlin Gallery space to include an outdoor sculpture garden designed by architects Albert S. Komatsu and Emery Young, Jr., and landscape architect Elbert Spence. Throughout the 1960s, Carlin lectured women's clubs on how to purchase and decorate the home with fine paintings and partnered with the Junior League on exhibitions in other Texas cities. In 1970. the Carlin Gallery mounted a memorial |retrospective exhibition for prolific Fort Worth printmaker Blanche McVeigh that included "virtually all" of her prints. Carlin organized an art exhibition at Fort Worth's first Mayfest celebration, organized by the Junior League in 1973. She was also a donor to Streams and Valleys' Trinity River beautification project in the 1970s. In 1990, Carlin announced the closing of the gallery. Over the course of 31 years, Carlin Gallery held over 150 exhibitions with work by 130 artists and steered the development of numerous museum collections in Texas.

== Death and legacy ==
Electra Carlin died in Fort Worth on February 19, 2000, and is buried at Oakwood Cemetery. She is remembered as an "exact, aware businesswoman" and the "dean of Fort Worth art dealers." A bequest from her estate established the Electra Carlin Endowment to fund exhibitions of Texas artists at Texas Christian University.
