= Charles T. Williams =

Texas modern sculptor, active in the mid-twentieth century

- Born: March 24, 1918; Weatherford, Texas
- Died: March 30, 1966 (aged 48); Fort Worth, Texas
- Education: Hardin Simmons University, Texas Christian University
- Known for: Sculpture
- Movement: Modernism, Abstraction

Charles Truett Williams was considered one of the first significant modern sculptors in Texas. Active in the mid-twentieth century, the Fort Worth-based artist became known for his inventive, abstracted sculptures, steering away from traditional, life-like renderings then popular in Texas. His mastery spanned across a multitude of media including wood, stone, sheet copper, cast bronze, steel, iron, and found objects.

== Early life and education ==
Williams was born to T. L. and Lucy (Hurst) Williams, on March 24, 1918, in Weatherford, Texas. After high school, he worked at a drugstore at the Baker Hotel in Mineral Wells, and saved up for college. He attended Abilene Christian College and Hardin Simmons University, following which he worked as an engineer.

After settling in Fort Worth in 1947, he attended evening classes at TCU while continuing to work for the Army Corps of Engineers. He received both his BFA and MFA in sculpture from TCU.

== Career ==
Williams was deployed to Paris in 1945, with the Army Corps of Engineers during World War II; his time there exposed him to various modernist movements and artists. He settled in Atlanta, Georgia, upon his return from France, with his wife, Louise, and son, Karl, where he worked under the Army Corps of Engineers as a draftsman. After his wife's death in 1947, Williams moved to Fort Worth with his son to live with his parents, continuing his career with the Army Corps of Engineers in Dallas. He pursued his love for sculpture in his spare time, using his garage as his studio, and enrolled at TCU for formal training. He later established a professional studio c.1952 which became a hub for his artistic contemporaries, including members of the Fort Worth Circle. Throughout his time in Fort Worth, he was encouraging of many young artists including Jim Love, David McManaway, and Roy Fridge.

He had two solo shows at the Fort Worth Art Center (now the Modern Art Museum of Fort Worth) – one in 1952, his first ever solo exhibition, and the other in 1957, which included close to 50 of his works. Other solo shows include:

- New Arts Gallery, Houston, 1958, 1960
- Nye Gallery, Dallas, 1960
- Fifth Avenue Gallery, Fort Worth, 1961
- Austin College, Sherman, 1961
- University of Oklahoma, Norman, 1963
- Valley House Gallery, Dallas, 1964, 1966
- Oklahoma Art Center, Oklahoma City, 1965
- Fort Worth Gallery, 1983

Some of the group shows in which he participated include exhibitions at the Dallas Museum of Contemporary Arts (now Dallas Museum of Art), Southern Methodist University, Witte Museum, University of Texas at Austin, Amon Carter Museum of American Art, Texas Tech University, Museum of Fine Arts, Houston, Amarillo Museum of Art, and Valley House Gallery.

After a heart attack in 1955, he decided to retire from the Army Corps of Engineers, and pursue sculpture full-time, despite experiencing pain from a previous heart attack.

== Work ==
Williams employed his engineering skills to visualize 2D renderings in 3D form, demonstrating masterful dexterity across his work, especially when creating symmetry and repeating elements in pieces like Lead Head (1964) and Fun with Freud (1964).

Many of his significant works were considered organic abstractions, primarily influenced by European artists encountered during his time in Paris, including Picasso, Braque, Miró, Giacometti, Brancusi, and Arp. Much like Henry Moore and Barbara Hepworth, Williams recognized the importance of incorporating negative space within sculptural compositions.

His lifelong fascination with calligraphy is believed to have manifested in marks and scores drawn on metal surfaces in pieces like Solar Disc (1964), and in his 9.5-ft high installation, Weiner Fountain (1954), he abstracted elements of Chinese calligraphic symbols to create plantlike structures using bronze rods and sheet metal. Captivated by Mesoamerican culture, Williams traveled to Mexico, Yucatán, and Guatemala, to study their art; his piece, Earth Mother (1958), drew inspiration from Chacmool's reclining pose, upright head, and raised knees.

Williams also fashioned humorous assemblages in playful reference to his artistic peers; The Exhibitionist (1962) – a portrait of Jim Love – and Moritz the Elephant (1965) are two such examples of his sculptural translation of conversations with friends. He enjoyed crafting “found art” made from carburetors, jacks, flotsam, driftwood and more, often gifting smaller works to friends. His installation, Totems Suburbium (1962), used the undersides of five sink basins, each mounted on timber poles to create a line of watchful sentinel-like figures.

Williams received many requests for public and commercial commissions. The Ridglea Country Club in Fort Worth commissioned three pieces, Odalisque (1954), Fountain Sculpture (1955), and Golfer (1955). His pieces created for long-time patron, Ted Weiner, were tributes to his inspirations – Calder is the Only One (1955) and Earth Mother (1958), which honors similar work by Moore. Other commissions include sculptural work for the Sheraton Hotel in downtown Houston, St. Martin's Episcopal Church in Houston, All Saints Hospital in Fort Worth, and Texas Turnpike Authority in Arlington. He collaborated with Octavio Medellin on a mural commission at the Temple Emanu-El in Dallas.

Though he rarely referenced his time at war in his work, Helmet (Pathos) (1962) is an exception, in which he crafted a soldier's helmet, with crude edges, that sits atop a steel stand on its crown to accentuate its emptiness, representing the dark realities of war.

In his later works, Williams began experimenting with color by using automobile paints and coating processes in pieces like Veritable Apparition (1965), Components (1965), and Small Blue Torus (1966).

== Collections ==
Williams' work can be found in the collections of the Modern Art Museum of Fort Worth, Dallas Museum of Art, and the Old Jail Art Center.

== Personal life ==
Williams and his first wife, Louise, had one son, Karl Williams. Upon his return to the United States after the war, they lived in Atlanta, Georgia, until Louise's death in 1947, which was caused by viral pneumonia. Williams moved with his son to Fort Worth shortly after, where he remained until his death in 1966. In 1952, he married Anita Stuart, his son's third grade teacher, with whom he traveled to various countries to study art and culture. He died of heart failure at the age of 48.
