= Bror Utter =

American artist (1913–1993)

- Born: August 26, 1913; Fort Worth, Texas, U.S.
- Died: May 6, 1993 (aged 79); Fort Worth, Texas
- Education: Fort Worth School of Fine Arts, Colorado Springs Fine Arts Center
- Organization(s): Allied Artists Club of Fort Worth, Fort Worth Art Association, Southern States Art League, Texas Fine Arts Association, Texas Watercolor Society, The Eight, Texas Artists Group
- Known for: Oil painting, Etching, Watercolor painting
- Movement: Fort Worth Circle

Bror Alexander Utter (August 26, 1913 – May 6, 1993) was a painter, printmaker, and art teacher who lived and worked his entire life in Fort Worth, Texas, but his art achieved national recognition. He worked in an array of styles ranging from landscapes influenced by Regionalism, still lifes, architectural scenes, and figurative works inspired by the theater to modernist abstractions. He was a prominent member of the Fort Worth Circle.

== Early life ==
Utter was born on August 26, 1913, at his parents' home in Fort Worth and showed artistic interest and talent from an early age. His mother was known for her drawings, and his maternal grandfather was a painter. His Finnish father, Bror A. Utter, owned a lithographic printing company in Fort Worth, Utter and Son Printers, where the junior Utter worked until 1950. Dutch Phillips, Utter's gallery representative, believed that his skill with color came from working at his father's company. His formal art education began at Central High School, where he studied under Sally Gillespie and Ella Ray Ledgerwood.

== 1930s ==
After graduating from high school, he studied with Evaline Sellors, Wade Jolly, and Blanche McVeigh at the Fort Worth School of Fine Arts from 1931 to 1936. His work from the 1930s focused on landscapes and motifs from the theater. During this period, he also experimented with collage, combining paper cloud forms reminiscent of Jean Arp and surreal figures cut from sample stock certificates. His first solo exhibition of watercolors was held in 1936 at the Fort Worth School of Fine Arts, and one critic stated that Utter was "probably one of the most original and individual young artists in town." In a 1938 announcement related to an exhibition at the YMCA of Oklahoma City, Charles Alldredge wrote, "Bror Utter, a young Texas of Swedish and Finnish extraction, sometimes paints like a Frenchman and sometimes like nothing else on earth. It is that last quality which makes him one of the most interesting of the exceptional group of younger painters with which America at present is blessed."

== 1940s ==
In the summer of 1940, he continued his studies with the assistance of a scholarship at the Colorado Springs Fine Art Center under the guidance of Arnold Blanche, Adolf Dehn, Otis Dozier, and Boardman Robinson. In the early 1940s, he started to experiment with compartmentalized space in his work. By the mid 1940s, Utter had developed a distinct style he referred to as "embellished forms" that often combined biomorphic shapes with a compartmentalized arrangement, a style described as "organic Surrealism." In the mid 1940s, vessels starting appearing as a prominent feature in his work, which was inspired by seeing a painting of vases by Paul Klee. He and a cadre of progressive Fort Worth artists, including Bill Bomar, Veronica Helfensteller, Dickson Reeder, and Donald Vogel, began to gain national attention in the 1940s, propelled by a 1944 group exhibition, Six Texas Painters, held at Weyhe Gallery, New York. This group of artists were to be later labeled the Fort Worth Circle. In 1941, IBM purchased a watercolor painting, Texas Oil Refinery, for its art collection.

== 1950s and beyond ==
Utter's professional success peaked in the 1950s after devoting himself full time to making art. One of his paintings, Nun's Distillery, depicting a series of carriages and pharmaceutical cabinets, received national attention in 1953 when it was included in the Whitney Museum of American Art's annual exhibition of contemporary American sculpture, watercolors, and drawings.

Utter embarked on a series of productive painting trips to Italy starting in 1954 that reinforced his interest in architecture and influenced his work from this period, including a series of watercolors depicting Fort Worth architectural landmarks from 1956 to 1957 that was commissioned by First National Bank of Fort Worth, now in the collection of the Amon Carter Museum of American Art.

Landscape and architecture continue to prominently appear in his work through the 1970s influenced by his travels to Italy, Mexico and New Mexico (to visit longtime friend Edwin Bewley), though he never completely abandoned his earlier abstract conventions. In many of his 1960s landscapes, he added a crazing effect to skies. In the late 1970s and after, he pivoted back to more abstract work, embodied by his Three Musicians from 1986, an homage to Picasso's masterwork of the same title.

In a 1956 newspaper article published at the time of a solo exhibition in Washington, D.C., he claimed that Texas had become the capital of contemporary art.

In a Fort Worth Star-Telegram article on the occasion of a retrospective exhibition in 1979, fellow Fort Worth artist Stuart Gentling observed, "When I see his work I cannot help but marvel at the wonderful manner in which he has absorbed and sublimated the visions of artists from the contemporary to the most distant epochs. No matter what his technique—his subtle personal color, his preoccupation with inverse perspective—he always speaks to the inner mind."

A home, studio, and garden he built on Mattison Avenue in Fort Worth was condemned in 1979 to make way for the Texas College of Osteopathic Medicine, and afterwards he moved to a small apartment across the street from the Kimbell Art Museum.

Alzheimer's disease curtailed his artistic activity towards the end of his life, and he died on May 6, 1993.

== Teaching career ==
He started teaching in the mid 1930s and became the first official art instructor for the Fort Worth Woman's Club. He taught at a number of Fort Worth institutions during his long teaching career, including the Fort Worth Art Association, Fort Worth Art Center, Texas Wesleyan College, Fort Worth Woman's Club, and the Fort Worth Junior League. He also regularly lectured and taught workshops in the Fort Worth region.

== Selected exhibitions ==
- Fort Worth School of Fine Arts, Fort Worth, Texas, 1936
- Annual Fort Worth Local Artists Show, 1940s
- Texas General Exhibition, 1940s
- Artists for Victory, Metropolitan Museum of Art, New York, 1942
- Dallas Museum of Art, Dallas, Texas, 1943 (solo), 1951, 1957 (solo)
- Six Texas Painters, Weyhe Gallery, New York, 1944
- Fort Worth Art Association, Fort Worth, Texas, 1946, 1953 (solo)
- Associated American Artists, New York, 1948
- Elisabet Ney Museum, Austin, Texas, 1948 (solo), 1960
- Associated American Artists, New York, 1949
- Southwestern Prints and Drawings Annual Exhibition, Dallas, Texas, 1949, 1952
- Brooklyn Museum, New York, [print exhibition], 1950
- Betty McLean Gallery, Preston Center, Dallas, Texas, September 17-October 13, 1951
- Texas Contemporary Artists, M. Knoedler & Company, New York, New York, 1952
- Texas Wildcat, San Francisco Museum of Art, 1952, San Francisco, California, and Fort Worth Art Association, Fort Worth, Texas, 1951
- Bror Utter, Fort Worth Art Association, Fort Worth, Texas, February 10–27, 1953
- Whitney Museum of American Art, New York, New York, 1953
- D.D. Feldman Collection of Contemporary Texas Art, Dallas, Texas, 1955, 1957
- Witte Museum, San Antonio, Texas, 1958 (solo)
- Haydon Calhoun Gallery, Dallas, Texas, 1961 (solo)
- Bror Utter: Retrospective Exhibition, Fort Worth Art Association, November 1961
- Retrospective exhibition [works from 1940 to 1970], New Gallery, Fort Worth, Texas, 1979
- Bror Utter: Fifty Years of His Art, J.M. Moudy Exhibition Space, Texas Christian University, Fort Worth, Texas, January 19-February 15, 1985
- Beyond Regionalism, Old Jail Art Center, April–July, 1986
- Retrospective exhibition, Fort Worth Art Gallery, 1990
- Prints of the Fort Worth Circle, 1940-1960, Archer M. Huntington Art Gallery, The University of Texas at Austin, Austin, Texas, September 4-November 1, 1992
- Three Painters of the Fort Worth School, Fort Worth Gallery, Fort Worth, Texas, [date unknown]

== Selected public collections ==
- Amon Carter Museum of American Art, Fort Worth, Texas - Show collection
- Colorado Springs Fine Arts Museum, Colorado Springs, Colorado
- Dallas Print Society, Dallas, Texas
- Denver Museum of Art, Denver, Colorado
- Modern Art Museum of Fort Worth, Fort Worth, Texas
- Old Jail Art Center, Albany, Texas
- Texas Fine Art Association, Austin, Texas
- University of North Texas, Denton, Texas

== Bibliography ==
- Amon Carter Museum of American Art, Bror Utter Papers
- Archives of American Art, Bror Utter Papers, 1938-1975 - microfilm reel 1514 and 1595 also available at the Amon Carter Museum of American Art, Research Library
