= Veronica Helfensteller =

American painter and printmaker

- Born: February 7, 1910; Fort Worth, TX
- Died: September 30, 1964 (aged 54); Tucson, AZ
- Education: Blanche McVeigh
- Alma mater: Washington University in St. Louis; Colorado Springs Fine Arts Center; Fort Worth School of Art
- Known for: Printmaking, painting
- Notable work: Cienega Willow; Three Virgins, Three Giraffes and a Turtle; The Artists and the Tiger; Doorway Aviary
- Movement: Fort Worth Circle
- Spouse: Haakon J. Ogle
- Elected: President, Fort Worth Artists Guild 1939

Veronica Helfensteller (1910–1964) was an American painter and printmaker, who was a member of the Fort Worth Circle, a group of artists in Fort Worth, Texas, active in the 1940 and 1950s.

== Life ==
Veronica Helfensteller was born in 1910 to Armin and Louise Helfensteller. She lived in Fort Worth during her early years. In 1926-27, she studied at the St. Louis School of Fine Arts at Washington University before continuing her studies at the Colorado Springs Fine Arts Center (Colorado Springs, Colorado). She later studied at the International School of Art in Budapest, Hungary.

Helfensteller exhibited her works in a solo show at the Fort Worth School of Fine Arts in 1938. Animals were at the center of many of Helfensteller's works. They were often depicted in fantastical, allegorical settings. Helfensteller was one of six artists from the Fort Worth group whose work was shown in the Weyhe Gallery in New York in 1944. In 1944, she began etching sessions that were attended by other Fort Worth Circle artists.

That same year, she began etching sessions that were attended by other Fort Worth Circle artists. Kelly Fearing, Dickson Reeder, Bror Utter, Lia Cuilty, Bill Bomar, Cynthia Brants and others would meet at Helfensteller's to work on their art. These weekly meetings were an opportunity for the artists to discuss art, listen to music, and borrow Helfensteller's printmaking press.

The last survivor of these long-ago meetings, Fearing, recalls them as a magical time in the waning days of a world war, a time of inventiveness and exuberance. Some nights they put aside their experimental engravings and, helped by the sherry they all adored, broke out into impromptu dancing.

— Jeff Prince, Fort Worth Weekly

After the group separated, Helfensteller moved to Santa Fe, New Mexico in 1947, where she opened a candy shop, taught and painted.

Her work was shown in the retrospective exhibition "Beyond Regionalism: The Fort Worth School (1945–1955)" (Albany, Texas, 1986); in the exhibition "The Texas Printmakers, 1940–1965" (Meadows Museum, Dallas, 1990), and the exhibition "Prints of the Fort Worth Circle, 1940–1960", (Archer Milton Huntington Art Gallery, 1992). Her work is held in the collections of the Modern Art Museum of Fort Worth, the Dallas Museum of Art, and the Museum of Fine Arts, Houston.

Later she moved to Tucson, Arizona, where she taught art history and art appreciation at the Valley School for Girls.

She died in Tucson, Arizona in 1964.

== Art ==
Veronica Helfensteller's artwork was influenced by the artists around her. As a member of the Fort Worth School, she was one of the Texas Modernists, whose works were influenced by American Regionalism, European Cubism and Surrealism. Helfensteller was an avid traveler and these travels influenced her work. Hoops and Kites (1948) incorporates a number of hieroglyphic figures, which reference Mayan hieroglyphics she would have seen in Guatemala. This work balances her Latin American travels with those of the Southwest.

Her works had been largely forgotten until gallery owner Dutch Philips discovered some of her letters at an estate sale. Upon discovering her art, Dutch Phillips organized the first exhibition of sale of her work in over 40 years.

== Bibliography ==
- Barker, Scott Grant; Myers, Jane (2008). Intimate modernism: Fort Worth Circle artists in the 1940s (1st ed.). Fort Worth, TX: Amon Carter Museum. ISBN 9780883601037. OCLC 180989563.
- Kovinick, Phil; Yoshiki-Kovinick, Marian (1998). An encyclopedia of women artists of the American West. University of Texas Press. ISBN 9780292790636.
- Vogel, Donald S. (2000). Memories and Images: The World of Donald Vogel and Valley House Gallery. University of North Texas Press. ISBN 978-1-57441-117-1.
