= Nicolino Calyo =

Italian-American painter (1799–1884)

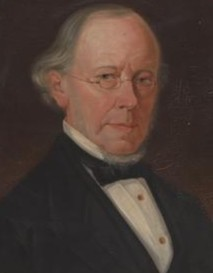
- Portrait of Calyo by his son, John
- Born: 1799; Kingdom of Naples
- Died: 9 December 1884 (aged 85); New York City, US
- Notable work: Depictions of the Great Fire of New York; Cries of New York

Nicolino Calyo (1799 – 9 December 1884) was an Italian-American painter best known for his paintings of the Great Fire of New York and other scenes in New York City. Born in the Kingdom of Naples in 1799, Calyo began studying art there before leaving in 1821 after taking part in a failed political uprising against King Ferdinand IV. He then traveled across Europe, continuing to study and produce art. After settling in Spain, Calyo was forced to migrate to the United States following the outbreak of the First Carlist War. He first landed in Baltimore before settling permanently in New York.

In New York, Calyo witnessed the Great Fire of New York, which he depicted in a series of 22 works. He also completed numerous other works and commissions, including a series of watercolors portraying common laborers in New York entitled Cries of New York. He utilized gouache heavily and created numerous different kinds of paintings, including landscapes, portraits, miniatures, and panoramas. During his lifetime, his works garnered him a degree of fame, particularly his Great Fire paintings. Calyo died in New York on 9 December 1884.

== Biography ==
=== Early life in Europe ===
Calyo was born in the Kingdom of Naples in 1799. He was born into an aristocratic family to parents Giuseppe and Maria Calyo. He studied art at the Academy of Naples until 1820, when he became involved in the political revolt against King Ferdinand IV. It was during the revolt that he met his wife, a Corsican woman named Laura. After the uprising failed, Calyo departed Naples in 1821 to escape persecution. He proceeded to travel across Europe; it is known that he visited cities such as Rome, Athens, Paris, Palermo, Granada, and Gibraltar based on his depictions of said areas. During his travels, he continued to study art and improve his artistic abilities.

By 1829, Calyo had settled in Malta with his wife and his two children, John and Elisabeth. There, he taught drawing and befriended other Italian refugees as well as Sir Frederick Ponsonby, the governor of Malta. Calyo's third child, Joseph, was born in Malta on 2 July 1832; sometime after, he and his family moved to Spain, where they remained until September 1833. That month, the First Carlist War began, pressuring Calyo to migrate once again.

=== Relocation to the United States ===
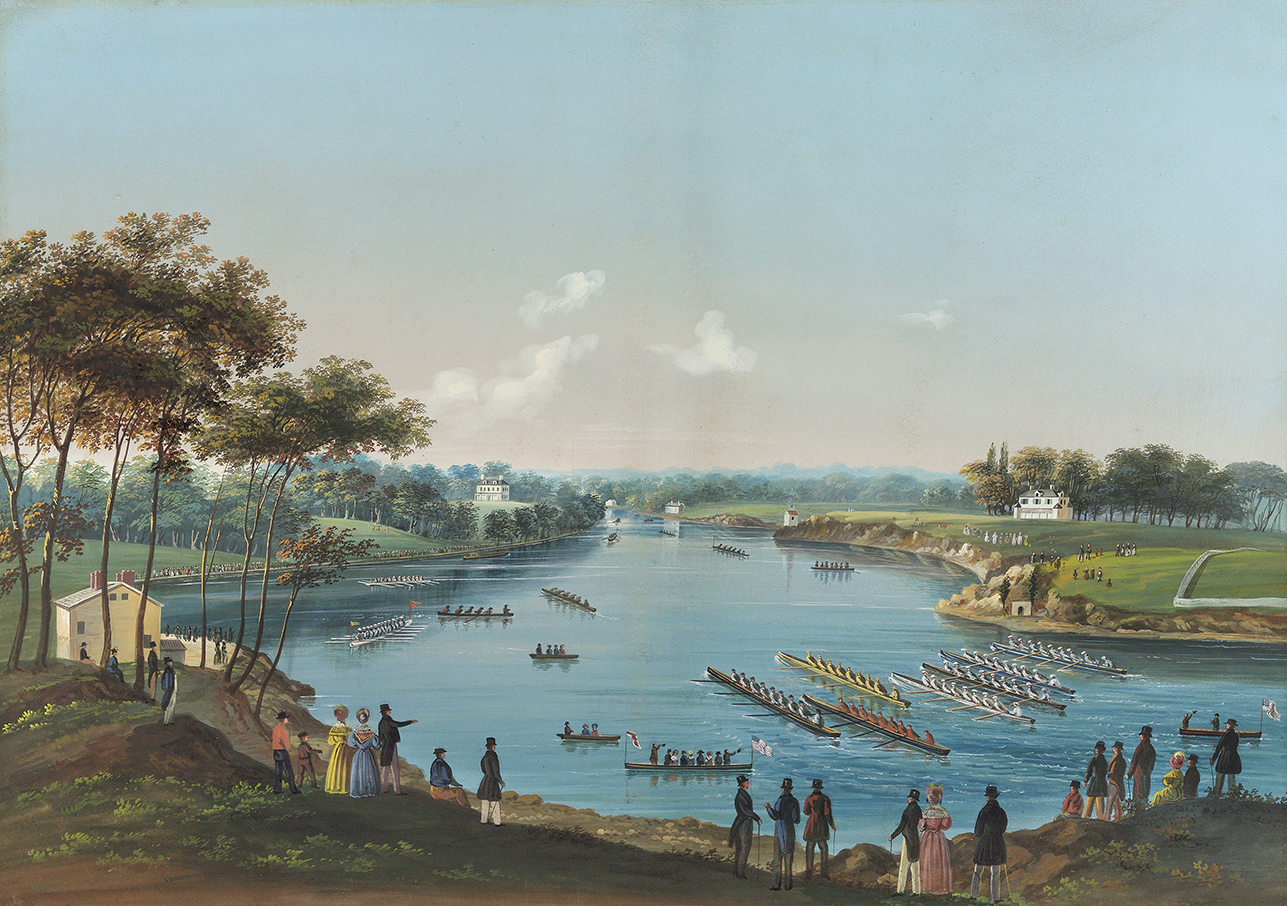
The First Schuylkill Regatta, c. 1835

After leaving Spain and making stops in the Canary Islands and Cape Verde, Calyo arrived in the United States in 1834, most likely landing in Baltimore. He established a studio there and by 31 August 1834, he completed a commission from Thomas Edmondson; entitled View of Harlem, the painting portrays the Edmondson estate in Baltimore. From early to mid-1835, Calyo held multiple successful exhibitions of his paintings of European views in Baltimore. His fourth child, Hannibal, was born in Baltimore in 1835.

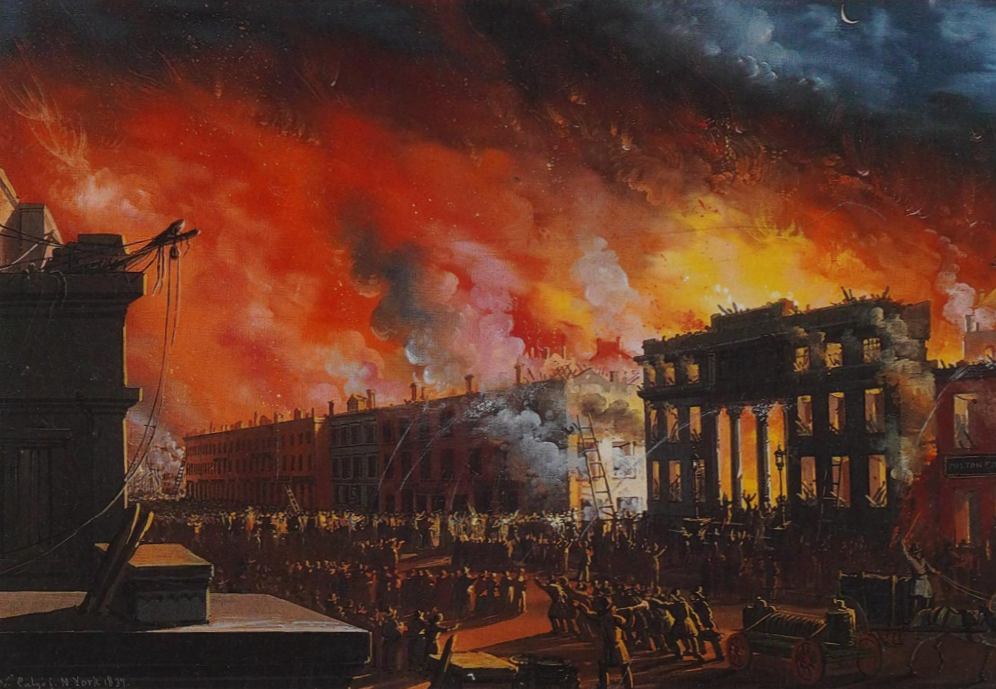
View of the Great Fire in New York, 1837

Calyo left Baltimore in June of that year and traveled to Philadelphia, a city which he painted numerous times, before settling in New York City in late 1835. Shortly after his arrival in New York, the Great Fire of New York broke out, destroying large sections of the city. Calyo was a witness to the fires and produced no less than 22 works depicting the disaster and its aftermath; these works are among his most well-known and garnered him a degree of fame. In addition to his depictions of the Great Fire, Calyo produced numerous paintings of various fires and explosions, such as the eruptions of Mount Vesuvius.

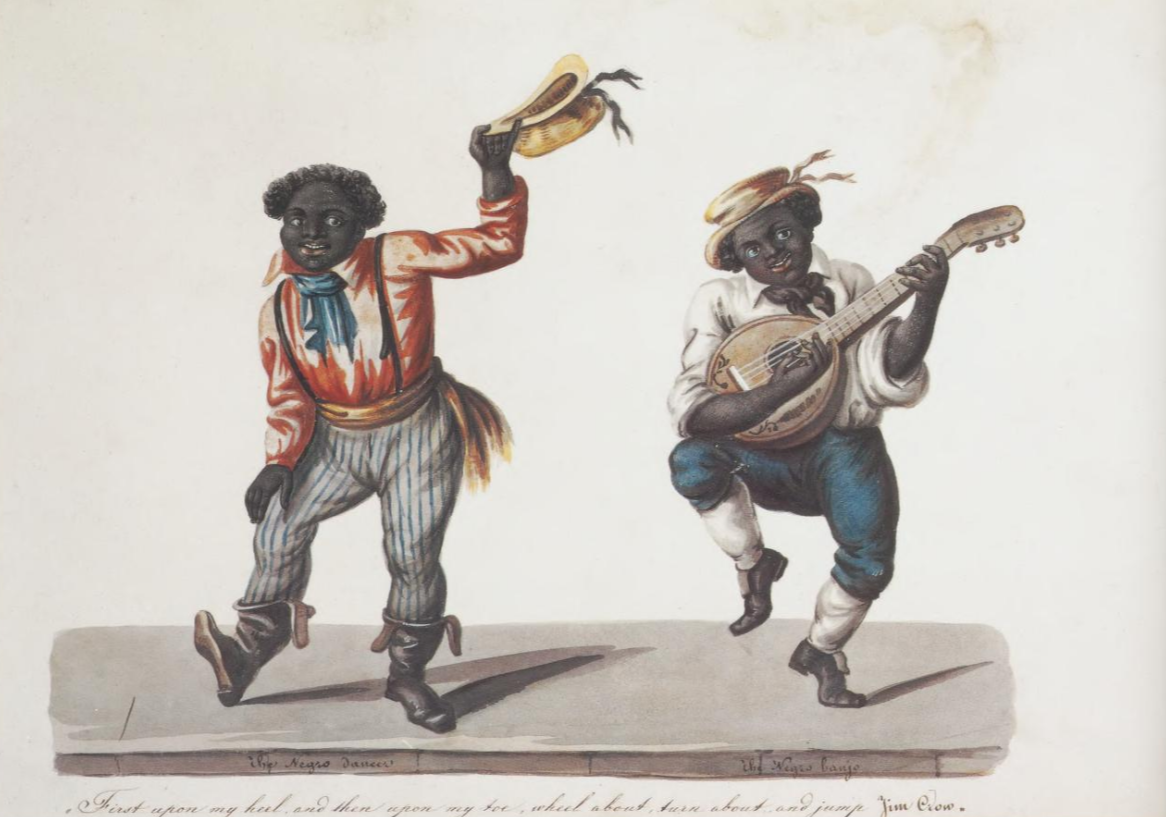
Negro Dancer and Banjo Player, 1835

While living in New York, Calyo produced a series of watercolor paintings depicting local inhabitants of the city. His subjects mainly comprised lower-class laborers, such as chimney sweeps, milkmen, and minstrel performers. Selections of the watercolors were published in the 1840s under the title Cries of New York. Alongside his Great Fire paintings, Cries of New York is one of the series for which he is best known. During this time, Calyo exhibited his works often; among his exhibited works were multiple panoramas, the subjects of which included the Connecticut River and scenes of the Mexican–American War. According to the writer Shearjashub Spooner, Calyo was highly skilled in appraising the authenticity of paintings, as well as restoring them; Spooner described him complimentarily as an "accomplished scholar, a true artist, [and] a true connoisseur".

The New York Daily Tribune described Calyo's home as a "museum of curiosities". In it, Calyo often hosted European refugees; notable figures known to have visited his home include the Italian statesman Giuseppe Garibaldi and the exiled Louis Napoleon. Calyo's sons John and Hannibal both became painters, while Joseph became a jeweler. He collaborated often with his sons and his son-in-law Giuseppe Allegri; in New York, he founded a firm called N. Calyo and Son, which offered instruction in art and completed commissions. Calyo and his sons began attending and supporting exhibitions of the American Watercolor Society in 1867.

Calyo may have left New York for Spain twice to serve as the court painter for Queen Maria Christina, the first time around 1842 and the second ending in 1874, whereupon he returned to New York; the writer Margaret Sloane Patterson described these visits as unverifiable due to the fact that Maria Christina was in exile in Paris at the time. In America, in addition to New York, Baltimore, and Philadelphia, he also worked in Charleston and Richmond. In 1881, Calyo's wife Laura died; three years later, Calyo died in New York on 9 December 1884. He was 85 years old.

== Works ==
Calyo is best known for his gouaches, a medium which he utilized heavily. Examples of his works using gouache include his series of paintings depicting the Great Fire of New York as well as his paintings of cities like New York and Baltimore. He also worked with watercolor, such as in his Cries of New York series. He produced a variety of different kinds of paintings, including landscapes, portraits, miniatures, and panoramas, as well as engravings. During his lifetime, Calyo's works and exhibitions garnered him a degree of fame; in May 1835, the Baltimore American reported that the "merits [of his paintings] are already so well known to a large portion of the intelligent and respectable Citizens of Baltimore". Additionally, according to the art historian Guy McElroy, he "immediately gained widespread fame" with his Great Fire paintings.

== Works cited ==
- "Art of the American West". The Kennedy Quarterly. XVI (2). Kennedy Galleries. June 1978.
- Bogart, Michele H. (2000). "Art Scenes and the Urban Scene in New York City". In Seidler Ramirez, Jan (ed.). Painting the Town: Cityscapes of New York. Museum of the City of New York. ISBN 9780300081992.
- Colwell, Stiles Tuttle (1984). "Thomas Edmondson". The Taste of Maryland: Art Collecting in Maryland 1800–1934. Walters Art Gallery. ISBN 9780911886283.
- Feld, Stuart P. (1991). Neo-Classicism in America: Inspiration and Innovation, 1810–1840. Hirschl & Adler Galleries. ISBN 9780915057412.
- Foster, Kathleen A. (2017). American Watercolor in the Age of Homer and Sargent. Philadelphia Museum of Art. ISBN 9780876332726.
- Hoopes, Donelson F. (1981) [1977]. American Watercolor Painting. Galahad Books. ISBN 9780883655610.
- Johnston, William R. (1984). "Nicolino Calyo". The Taste of Maryland: Art Collecting in Maryland 1800–1934. Walters Art Gallery. ISBN 9780911886283.
- McElroy, Guy C. (1990). Facing History: The Black Image in American Art 1710–1940. Bedford Arts. ISBN 978093849138-5.
- "Nicolino Calyo: View of the Ruins after the Great Fire in New York, 1835". Museum of Fine Arts, Houston.
- Patterson, Margaret Sloane (1982). "Nicolino Calyo and His Paintings of the Great Fire of New York, December 16th and 17th, 1835". American Art Journal. 14 (2). Kennedy Galleries: 4–22. doi:10.2307/1594304. JSTOR 1594304.
- Richardson, Edgar P. (1944). American Romantic Painting. E. Weyhe.
- Rodriguez Roque, Oswaldo (1985–1986). "Nicolino Calyo". Recent Acquisitions (Metropolitan Museum of Art). Metropolitan Museum of Art: 49–51. doi:10.2307/1513691. JSTOR 1513691.
- Seidler Ramirez, Jan; Buff, Barbara Ball (2000). "Catalogue". In Seidler Ramirez, Jan (ed.). Painting the Town: Cityscapes of New York. Museum of the City of New York. ISBN 9780300081992.
- Taylor, William R. (2000). "The Painter and the City". In Seidler Ramirez, Jan (ed.). Painting the Town: Cityscapes of New York. Museum of the City of New York. ISBN 9780300081992.
- "View of the Tunnel of the Harlem Railroad". Metropolitan Museum of Art.
