= Shearjashub =

Shearjashub may refer to:

- Shearjashub, a minor Old Testament figure
- Shearjashub Bourn (1721–1781), Justice of the Rhode Island Supreme Court
- Shearjashub Bourne (1746–1806), U.S. congressman from Massachusetts
- Shearjashub Spooner (1809–1859), American physician and writer
