= Kelly Fearing =

Texas visual artist

- Born: October 18, 1918; Fordyce, Arkansas, U.S.
- Died: March 13, 2011; Austin, Texas, U.S.
- Education: Louisiana Polytechnic Institute, Columbia University
- Known for: Visual arts
- Movement: Surrealism, Modernism

William Kelly Fearing was an American visual artist who was termed, in his time, a “magical realist” and “Romantic surrealist”. He was a member of the Fort Worth Circle, a cohort of artists often credited with bringing modern art to Texas and the firsts to steer away from the then dominating regional aesthetic. His spiritual themes spanned across multiple styles including abstract, impressionism, and surrealism.

== Early life ==
Fearing was born in Fordyce, Arkansas, and grew up in Louisiana. Physicality reflected in his oeuvre is said to have been influenced by his education in gymnastics and fascination for ballet and tap dance from an early age.

== Education ==
Fearing attended Louisiana Polytechnic Institute (now Louisiana Tech University) where he received his Bachelor of Arts degree in 1941.

In 1947, Fearing enrolled at Columbia University to pursue his Master’s degree, owing to the funding efforts of Sam Cantey, a prominent patron of the Fort Worth Circle. In tandem with the faculty position he accepted at the University of Texas at Austin that same year, he completed his graduate studies in New York in 1950.

== Career ==
After graduating from Louisiana Tech University, Fearing worked as a middle school art teacher in Winnfield, Louisiana. In 1943, he left his teaching position to receive volunteer defense industry training during World War II, and moved to Fort Worth to work as a draftsman-in-training for Consolidated Vultee Aircraft. Over the course of his employment as a production illustrator, co-worker and fellow artist, Dickson Reeder, introduced him to the group of artists that eventually became known as the Fort Worth School, and later the Fort Worth Circle.

Fearing taught at Texas Wesleyan College (now Texas Wesleyan University) from 1945 to 1947 as head of the art department, following which he joined the University of Texas at Austin as the Ashbel Smith Professor in Art. He remained at the university as a faculty member and retired in 1987 as a Professor Emeritus. He received the E. William Doty Award in 2007, the most prestigious educator recognition given by the university’s College of Fine Arts. He was considered a pioneer in arts education, largely due to his Junior Art Project through UT Austin, which offered free university-based instruction and exposure to visual art for children of all ages and economic backgrounds.

== Work ==
During Fearing’s undergraduate studies, his work largely subscribed to the then ubiquitous regionalist style in the American South which can be seen in his piece, The Pink Pigs (1940). His early work still showed hints of his attraction to international artistic movements like Surrealism and Symbolism. The Fort Worth Circle further expanded his exposure to artists like Picasso, Matisse, Klee, Ernst, and other surrealists. Though short-lived in the late 1940s, Klee’s influence on Fearing made a deep impact on his exploration of spirituality in his work. Some of his literary influences included Kafka, Eliot, Gandhi, and Tagore.

Spirituality, a salient theme in many of his paintings, often manifested as depictions of and references to Biblical characters and saints, Judeo-Christian monks, and figures from Asian cultures like Shree Bhagwan Rajneesh, under whom he studied. Examples of such works are St. Anthony and St. Paul in the Desert (1953), The Three Kings; The Magi with Animals (1960), Out of India; Rajneesh Sanyasians on the Bhagwan Shree Meditation Stone, Jabalpur (1979-1980), and St. Francis with Birds & Animals (1985-1989). His oeuvre reflected his desire to experience metaphysical aspects of life, rather than expressing faith in any religion. While figures in his works typically were portrayed in repose or suggested slow movement, some pieces like The Jitterbuggers (1939) and The Lifters (1946) center human dynamism and form.

One of Fearing’s recurring subjects was kite-flying, seemingly symbolic of spiritual quests. The Kite Flyers (1945) depicts two children with an adult male figure, grounded in a gloomy landscape as they fly their kites; like in many of Fearing’s paintings, features of the landscape discernibly extend upwards toward the sky, alluding to the heavens above. Kite Flyers Beneath A Canopy (1955), made in contrast to the prevalent post-war optimism, shows a similar scene with a canopy above the figures, representing obstacles faced when seeking higher planes in life.

Many of the landscapes in which he placed his figures were rooted in real places he frequented like the Colorado Rockies, the Central Texas Hill Country, and Californian coasts, yet his depictions appear fantastical to capture the grandeur and transcendence of nature. Fearing’s renderings of flora and fauna were influenced by Dürer and Pisanello respectively. As a nod to revering all life, animals occupied much of his oeuvre, especially large African mammals including giraffes, lions, rhinoceros, zebras, and okapis, often set in mystical backgrounds. Like Sacred Beast Walking Gently on a Beach (1971), many of Fearing’s pieces combined elements of both representational and surrealist art. He employed renderings of fish to reference the underworld, human evolution, and their roles in religious stories as depicted in pieces like, Tobias and the Angel (1951).

Fearing's interest in collage developed in part from his usage of it as a teaching tool when encouraging students to experiment. He incorporated myriad materials including metal, plastic, stones, broken windshield glass, fabric, seeds, and other organic material in his collages, revealing his playful approach to artmaking.

== Collections ==
Fearing’s works are housed in the permanent collections of the Blanton Museum of Art, Dallas Museum of Art, Modern Art Museum of Fort Worth, Amon Carter Museum of American Art, and Old Jail Arts Center.

== Death ==
Fearing died due to congestive heart failure at the age of 92 in his home.
