= Flora Blanc =

American painter

Flora Blanc Reeder
- Photo portrait of Flora Reeder, ca. 1940
- Born: Flora Blanc; November 14, 1916; New York City, US
- Died: September 26, 1995 (aged 78); Fort Worth, Texas, US
- Known for: Painting
- Spouse: Edward Dickson Reeder (m. 1937–1970)

Flora Blanc Reeder (November 14, 1916 – September 26, 1995) was an American drama teacher and painter. She was the director of the Reeder Children's School of Theater and Design in Fort Worth, Texas. As a painter she was a member of the Fort Worth Circle, a group of artists active in the 1940s and 1950s.

== Early life and education ==
The daughter of Edward Blanc and Martha Elliot King, Flora Blanc was born in New York in 1916. She received her formal art training at New York's Art Students' League as well as the elite Brearley School, and in France, where she met Edward Dickson Reeder, a young artist from Fort Worth. The two went on to pursue their talents in New York and Paris, and studied at Atelier 17 under Stanley William Hayter.

Blanc and Reeder married in New York in December 1937, and in 1940 the couple moved to Fort Worth, where Blanc painted and conducted acting classes for the Our Lady of Victory College. Blanc and Dickson performed with the Little Theater and forged close friendships with other local artists, eventually leading to the formation of the Fort Worth Circle, who would congregate at the Reeders' home on a regular basis to discuss their practices and engage in exchanges.

In the spring of 1945, Blanc enrolled in a TCU course that explored multi-disciplinarity in the arts, taught by Lorraine Sherley. For the course's final assignment, Blanc produced the play Aucassin and Nicolette, with a cast of twenty children from the neighbourhood. Dickson designed the sets, the artist Bror Utter designed the lighting, and Brooks Morris, Jr., conducted the score.

== Career ==
This production led for the opening of the Reeder-Irwin School in August 1945, with a student body of thirty-five kids and Ike Horowitz serving as first board chairman. Zane Irwin taught dance and other instructors, including Blanc, taught drama, painting, and music. Tuition was levied through instruction/enrolment trades. The school changed its name to the Reeder Children's School of Theater and Design in 1948, and adopted a curriculum that was similar to New York's King-Coit School which Blanc attended in her youth.

The Reeder school closed in 1958, after staging an additional thirteen plays, in order to provide the artist couple more time to focus on their respective practices.

== Personal life ==
Blanc died in 1995 in Fort Worth.
