= Max Fischer =

Max Fischer may refer to:

- Max Fischer (art collector) (1886–1975), German art collector
- Max Fischer (politician) (1927–2015), German politician, representative of the Christian Social Union of Bavaria
- Max Fischer (screenwriter), writer and director of The Lucky Star
- Max Fischer, the main character in the 1998 film Rushmore

== See also ==
- Max Fisher (1908 – 2005), an American businessman and philanthropist.
