= William Purinton Bomar Jr. =

American artist (1919–1991)

William "Bill" Purinton Bomar Jr. (December 30, 1919 – November 26, 1991) was an American painter who was a member of the Fort Worth Circle.

== Early life and education ==
Bomar was born on December 30, 1919, in Fort Worth, Texas, to William Sr. and Jewel Ruth Bomar (née Nail). His father a civic leader and business executive, Bomar was raised by wealthy parents. He was diagnosed with cerebral palsy as a child, and began painting at age 7. As a child, his parents connected him with art collector Anne Burnett Tandy and painter Murray Bewley, as well permitting mentorship from Sallie Blyth Mummert and Joseph Bakos. In 1940 and 1941, he attended the Cranbrook Academy of Art. He dropped out and later studied under Hans Hofmann, Amédée Ozenfant and John Sloan.

== Career ==
Bomar's works were often presented at the Texas General Exhibition, with a painting of his at the 1947 show being the highest-sold painting of that year's show. He won an award from the Fort Worth Art Association for a painting of his—The Cat in Portia's Garden—in 1944, which put him in association with who would be the founding members of the Fort Worth Circle. Paintings of his were presented at the Whitney Museum and the Weyhe Gallery during his lifetime. Other paintings were posthumously presented at the Modern Art Museum of Fort Worth, the Amon Carter Museum of American Art, the Dallas Museum of Art, the Museum of Fine Arts, Houston, the Brooklyn Museum, the Solomon R. Guggenheim Museum and the Harwood Museum of Art.

He lived between New York City—the location of his studio—and Ranchos de Taos, New Mexico—where he purchased a house—between the 1950s and 1960s, permanently moving to Ranchos de Taos in 1972. A member of the Taos Art Association, he and his cousin Reilly established the Old Jail Art Center in 1980. He died on November 26, 1991, aged 71, in Ranchos de Taos.
