= Great Fire of New York =

1835 highly destructive fire in New York City

Coordinates: 40.707°N 74.010°W

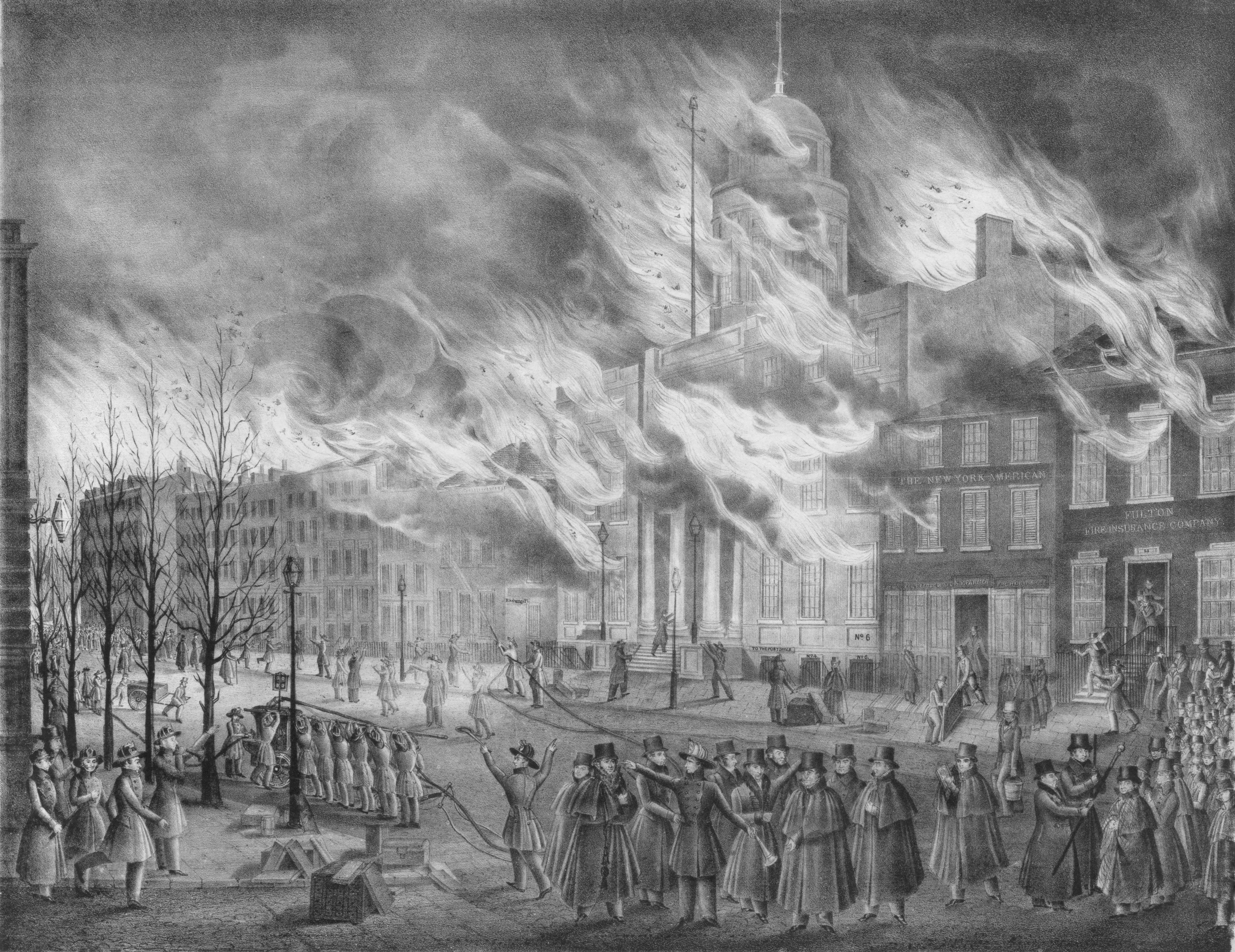
April 1836 lithograph of the destruction of the Merchant's Exchange Building on Wall Street, during the Great Fire

The 1835 Great Fire of New York was one of three fires that rendered extensive damage to New York City in the 18th and 19th centuries. The fire occurred in the middle of an economic boom, covering 17 city blocks, killing two people, and destroying hundreds of buildings, with an estimated $20 million of property damage (equivalent to $658 million in 2025).

== Background ==
By 1835, New York City was the premier American city, and its financial prowess surpassed that of Philadelphia or Boston. The opening of the Erie Canal ten years earlier connected New York to raw materials and commercial interests in the Midwest and allowed the city to rise to prominence as a market hub. Over half of the country's exports left through New York Harbor, while more than a third of American imports arrived there. Insurance companies, investment firms, real estate companies, and others made New York their home.

As the city expanded northward and its economic significance increased, fire was a major concern. Insurance companies worried that a large fire could sap their resources. The mayor and common council members held stock in or were board members of many fire insurance firms. City officials made efforts to build more watch towers and hire more watchmen. One serious impediment to firefighting was the lack of a reliable water source, as little had been done by 1835 to solve the city's water problem. The city's residents, as well as its firefighters, relied on neighborhood wells, forty fire cisterns, and a reservoir located at 13th Street and the Bowery.

The fire department's growth in the 1820s and 1830s had not kept pace with the growth of the city. The city's population had swelled by an additional 145,000 in the previous decade, but the department had added only about 300 firemen. A roster of 1,500 firemen, 55 engines, 6 ladder companies, and 5 hose carts was deemed insufficient to protect the city. Throughout the summer and fall of 1835, the department had fought numerous fires. On December 14, the entire fire department spent the freezing, miserable evening fighting two large fires, which destroyed thirteen buildings and two shops. The city's fire cisterns were nearly empty and its firefighting force exhausted when disaster struck.

== Fire ==
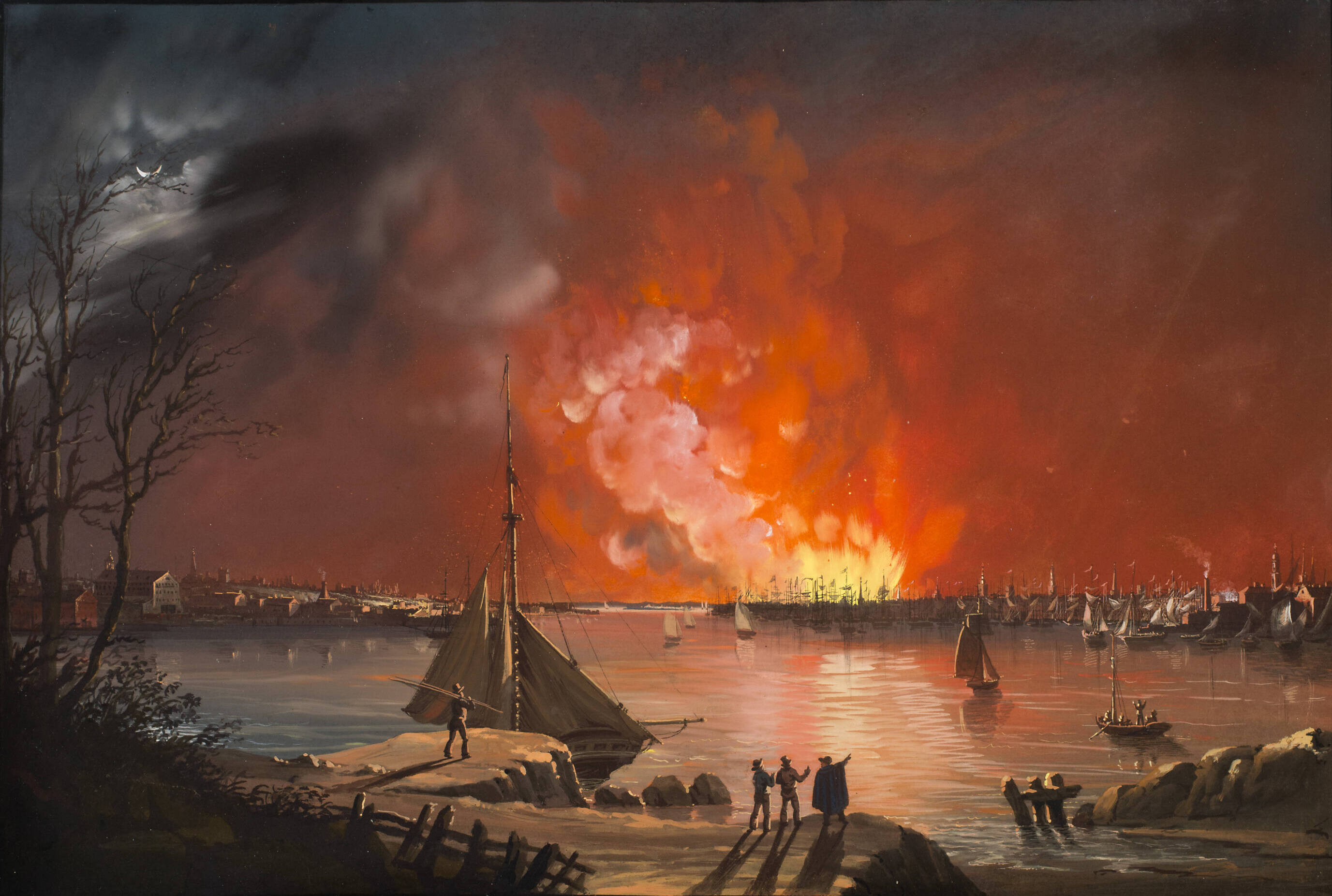
View of the Great Fire in New York, December 16–17, 1835, as seen from Williamsburg, Brooklyn, painted by Nicolino Calyo

The fire began on the evening of December 16, 1835, in a five-story warehouse at 25 Merchant Street, now known as Beaver Street, at the intersection of Hanover Street and Wall Street. As it spread, gale-force winds blowing from the northwest towards the East River spread the fire. The conflagration was visible from Philadelphia, approximately 80 miles (130 km) away.

At the time of the fire, major water sources, including the East River and the Hudson River, were frozen in temperatures as low as −17 °F (−27 °C). Firefighters were forced to drill holes through ice to access water, which later refroze around the hoses and pipes. Attempts were made to deprive the fire of fuel by demolishing surrounding buildings, but at first, there was insufficient gunpowder in Manhattan to use as demolition charges. Later in the evening, a detachment of U.S. Marines and sailors returned at 3 a.m., with gunpowder from the Brooklyn Navy Yard, and began to blow up buildings in the fire's path. The Evening Post reported that "The detachment of marines from the navy yard under Lieutenant Reynolds and sailors under Captain Mix rendered the most valuable service, the gun powder brought to the magazine at Red Hook was partly under their charge."

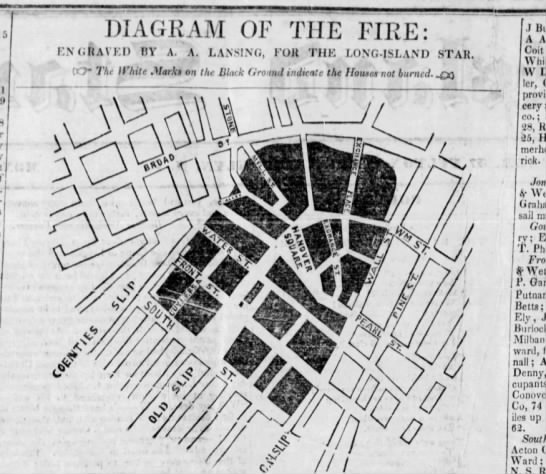
The Long Island Star,( Brooklyn New York) 21 Dec 1835, p.2. "Diagram of the Fire", showing the extent of the destruction.

An investigation found that a burst gas pipe, which was ignited by a coal stove, was the initial source; no blame was assigned.

== Damage ==
The fire covered 13 acres (53,000 m^{2}) in 17 city blocks and destroyed between 530 and 700 buildings. This part of the city is now known as Coenties Slip, an area between the East River and Maiden Lane in the north and William Street in the west. According to an account published in the History of the City of New York:

Many of the stores destroyed in the fire were new, with iron shutters and doors and copper roofs. When they burned, witnesses described the appearance of immense iron furnaces in full blast. The heat at times melted the copper roofing, and the liquid ran off in great drops. A gale blew towards the East River. Wall after wall was heard tumbling like an avalanche. Fiery tongues of flame leaped from the roof and windows along whole streets and seemed to be making angry dashes at each other. The water of the bay looked like a vast sea of blood. The bells rang for a while and then ceased. Both sides of Pearl Street and Hanover Square were at the same instant engulfed in flames.

A report that appeared shortly after the fire in the Evening Post, 23 December 1835, recounted that, "674 tenements, the merchants exchange and three or four vessels lying at the wharf's on South Street were destroyed."

A report from London gave a colorful account of the damage, praising the resilience of the population:

A most awful conflagration occurred at New York on the 15th of December, by which 600 buildings were destroyed, comprising the most valuable district of the city, including the entire destruction of the Exchange, the Post Office, and an immense number of stores. The fire raged incessantly for upwards of fifteen hours. The shipping along the line of wharves suffered considerably; several vessels were destroyed. The property consumed is estimated at 20,000,000 dollars. In the midst of this terrible visitation, however, it is consolatory to see the elastic energy of the people. Instead of wasting their time in despondency over this frightful desolation, the whole population seems on the alert to repair the mischief.

== Reconstruction ==
Recovery meant improved buildings, which would require financing. Negotiations were swiftly undertaken, and the cooperation of banks was crucial in preventing an economic disaster. A London magazine wrote, "Plans of rebuilding on an improved scale and modes of borrowing money for that purpose, on sound securities, are under arrangement. The energy of the inhabitants and the ready manner in which the banks had offered to make advances to the different insurance companies, as well as to private individuals, would avert, it was expected, a commercial crisis."

The fire bankrupted several insurance companies, slowing the processing of claims; 23 of New York's 26 insurance companies went out of business, and Hartford, Connecticut-based insurers (led by the Hartford Fire Insurance Co.) came to dominate the New York fire insurance market.

== Bibliography ==
- Levy, Daniel S. (2022) Manhattan Phoenix: The Great Fire of 1835 and the Emergence of Modern New York, Oxford University Press, ISBN 978-0-19-538237-2

== See also ==
- Great Fire of New York (1776)
- Great New York City Fire of 1845
- Great Fire of London
- Great Fire of Brisbane
- Great Chicago Fire
- Great Fire of Turku
