= Eric Bransby =

American painter (1916–2020)

Eric James Bransby
- Born: October 25, 1916; Auburn, New York
- Died: September 23, 2020 (aged 103); Colorado Springs, Colorado
- Known for: Mural painting

Eric James Bransby (October 25, 1916 – September 23, 2020) was an American artist and muralist. He studied and made murals in Colorado Springs, Colorado, including several at the Colorado Springs Fine Arts Center. He taught at Yale University, Brigham Young University, and University of Missouri-Kansas City.

== Early years and personal life ==
Eric Bransby was born in October 1916 in Auburn, New York to Lillian Holland Dowsett Bransby and Charles Carson Bransby. He was raised in Pittsburgh, Pennsylvania and then in Council Bluffs, Iowa. His father was born in Manchester, England, raised in Scotland and was a preacher. His mother was born in New Zealand and raised in London, England.

Bransby was married for nearly 70 years to Mary Ann, until her death in August, 2011. Mary Ann Hemmie, daughter of Joe and Lillian Hemmie was an artist and educator. Mary Ann attended the Kansas City Art Institute on a scholarship and studied silversmithing. She studied and mastered watercolor painting under Thomas Hart Benton. Two weeks before the Pearl Harbor Attack in December 1941, Mary Ann married Eric Bransby, who was a fellow student;. Their daughter, Fredericka was born in June, 1943. Their daughter developed asthma and the family returned to Colorado Springs for a more favorable climate for Fredericka. (Note: Mary Ann also studied at Yale University and the University of Illinois at Urbana. She completed her bachelor's and master's degree at University of Missouri in Kansas City. She taught at Donnelly College and University of Missouri at Kansas City, where she taught at the graduate level. She "initiated" a program called "Choreographing the Object" that was a fusion of music, dance and art. Performances were conducted in the Midwest, an annual meeting of the College Art Association, and on the television program Good Morning America. In Colorado Springs, following retirement, Mary Ann founded the Chromatic Edge and The Pikes Peak Watercolor Society.)

He turned 100 in October 2016 and died in September 2020 at the age of 103.

== Education ==
During the Great Depression, Bransby studied under Thomas Hart Benton in Kansas City. He created his first mural for the Works Progress Administration in Kansas City, Kansas. After World War II, Bransby continued his studies on the G.I. Bill. He studied at the Colorado Springs Fine Arts Center School. (Note: A Press Release issued by the Colorado Springs Fine Arts Center stated that Bransby studied at the center from 1938-1940, but he studied in Kansas during this time period.) His wife also studied at the school. Both were students of Boardman Robinson. and then Eric was a student of Jean Charlot, who helped him finish the thesis for Colorado College and paint the college's Cossitt Hall domed ceiling in 1947, the year of his graduation from the college.

Aside from his teachers and himself, other key muralists at Colorado Springs Fine Arts Center during the New Deal era included Archie Musick, Ethel Magafan, George Biddle, and Edgar Britton. In 1952 he studied at Yale under abstract colorist Josef Albers.

== World War II ==
Bransby served as a soldier in the Army during World War II. His wife designed parts and die forms for B-52 bombers.

== Career ==
Bransby taught at Yale University, Brigham Young University, and University of Missouri in Kansas City. His wife also taught at Brigham Young University.

== Works ==
- Resilience mural (2012), made for the Colorado Springs Fine Arts Center's Glass Corridor, was made to celebrate the center's 75th Anniversary. The mural includes the history of the center and art forms, including dance, theatre and music. The 5' by 27' mural was made when Bransby was 94 years of age and was dedicated April 20, 2012. After his wife's death, former art student Rev. Bradford N. Bray suggested to Bransby that he add her to the mural of the History of the Fine Arts Center. She was depicted as a student of Robinson.
- Frescos (1986) were repainted by Bransby over the Colorado Springs Fine Arts Center's front entrance for its 50th anniversary. The frescos were originally painted by Boardman Robinson in 1936, but had faded over time. Blake Milteer, the museum's director stated that: "Bransby masterfully enhanced Robinson's original forms with his own details on the original facade."
- Student Achievement mural, Nichols Hall, Kansas State University (1986). The mural, dedicated on October 10, 1986, depicts the history of Nichols Hall on the east wall of the atrium.
- History of Navigation (1968) was commissioned by the United States Air Force Planetarium and has been on loan from the Air Force Academy to the Colorado Springs Fine Arts Center. Made the year before the Apollo 11 Moon landing, mural panels totally 30 feet in length, depict navigation history up to space travel. The work was made in polymer and tempera.
- Mural on a wall of the Colorado Springs Fine Arts Center (1950s). The mural was torn down during a renovation in the 1970s.
- "Legacy of St Paul" (1986) commissioned by St Paul Lutheran Church and Academy, Skokie, Illinois.

== Publications ==
The following are publications by or about Bransby:

- Eric Bransby; William U. Eiland; Marilyn Laufer (1 June 2004). Figurative Connections: Selected Works by Eric Bransby. University of Georgia, Georgia Museum of Art. ISBN 978-0-915977-53-6.
- Colorado Springs Pioneers Museum (1996). Murals of the Pikes Peak Region: Eric Bransby, Artist. The Museum.
- Jay Kriss, Nancy Bentley, John Atkinson. Art for the People: Eric Bransby, American Mural Artist. A film documentary, 2019
