= Edward Dickson Reeder =

American painter

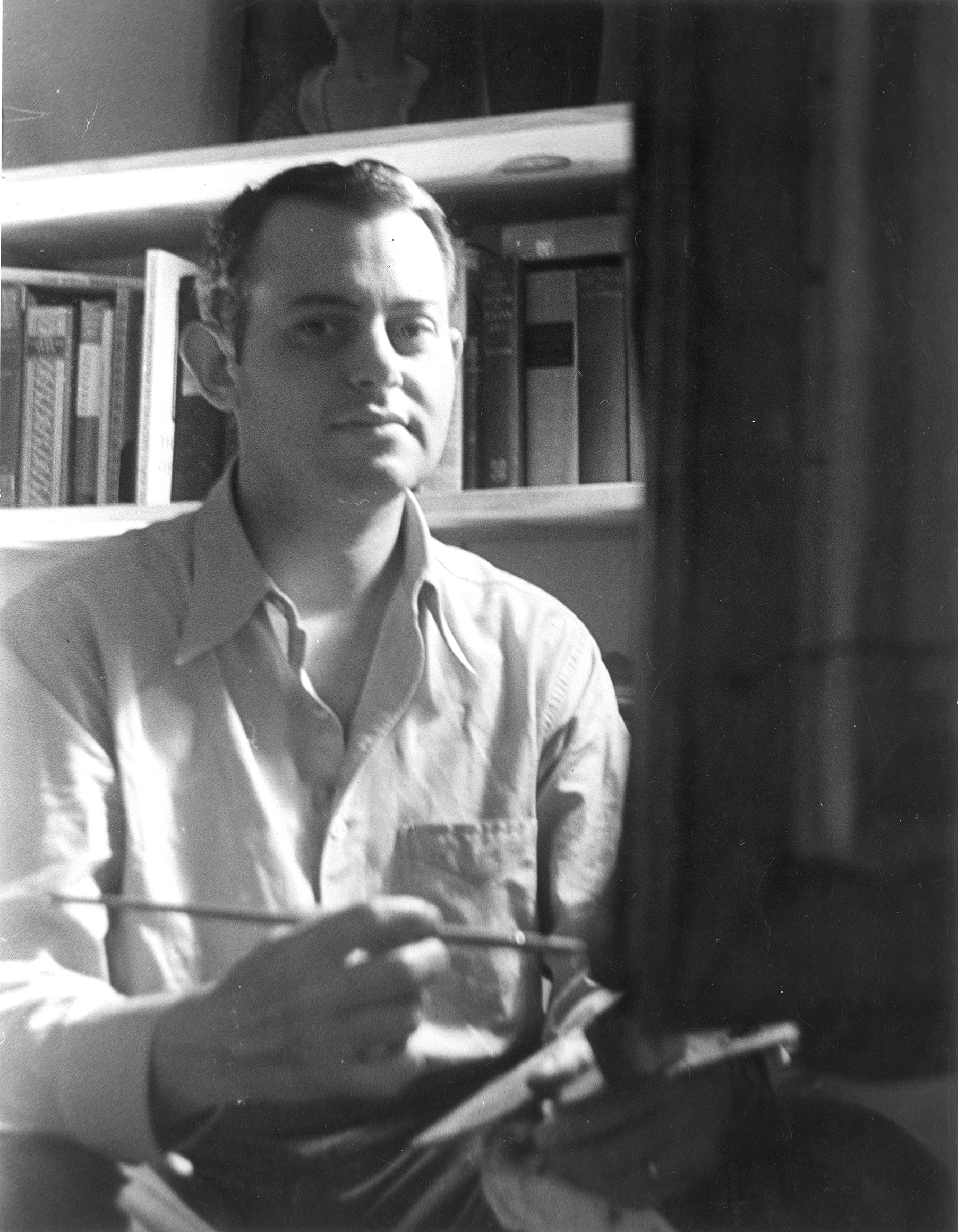
- Born: February 6, 1912; Fort Worth, Texas U.S.
- Died: May 8, 1970 (aged 58); Fort Worth, Texas U.S.
- Occupation: Artist
- Years active: 1933-1970
- Spouse: Flora Blanc Reeder

Edward Dickson Reeder (6 February 1912 – 8 May 1970) was an American artist and member of the Fort Worth Circle.

== Early life and education ==
Reeder was born in Fort Worth, Texas. He was the eldest child of Dean W. and Edwina Reeder. Reeder graduated from Central High School, Fort Worth in 1930, and went on to study at the Art Students League of New York in New York City.

== Career ==
In 1933 Reeder went to Taxco, Guerrero, Mexico, where he studied with the artist and portraitist Wayman Elbridge Adams. During the 1930s Reeder worked in London and Paris - in the latter city he studied abstraction under Aleksandra Ekster. After getting married in New York, Reeder and his wife moved back to Fort Worth in 1940.

In 1945 the Reeder School of Theater and Design for Children was opened. Reeder combined teaching at the school with his artistic career, exhibiting and portrait work. The Reeders closed the school in 1958 to take a two-year sabbatical in Paris, returning to Fort Worth in 1960.

== Personal life ==
Reeder met the artist Flora Blanc in 1937 and they married on 11 December 1937 in New York.

Reeder died in May 1970 after a year-long illness.
