= Colorado Springs Fine Arts Center =

Arts center in Colorado Springs, Colorado, U.S.

- U.S. National Register of Historic Places
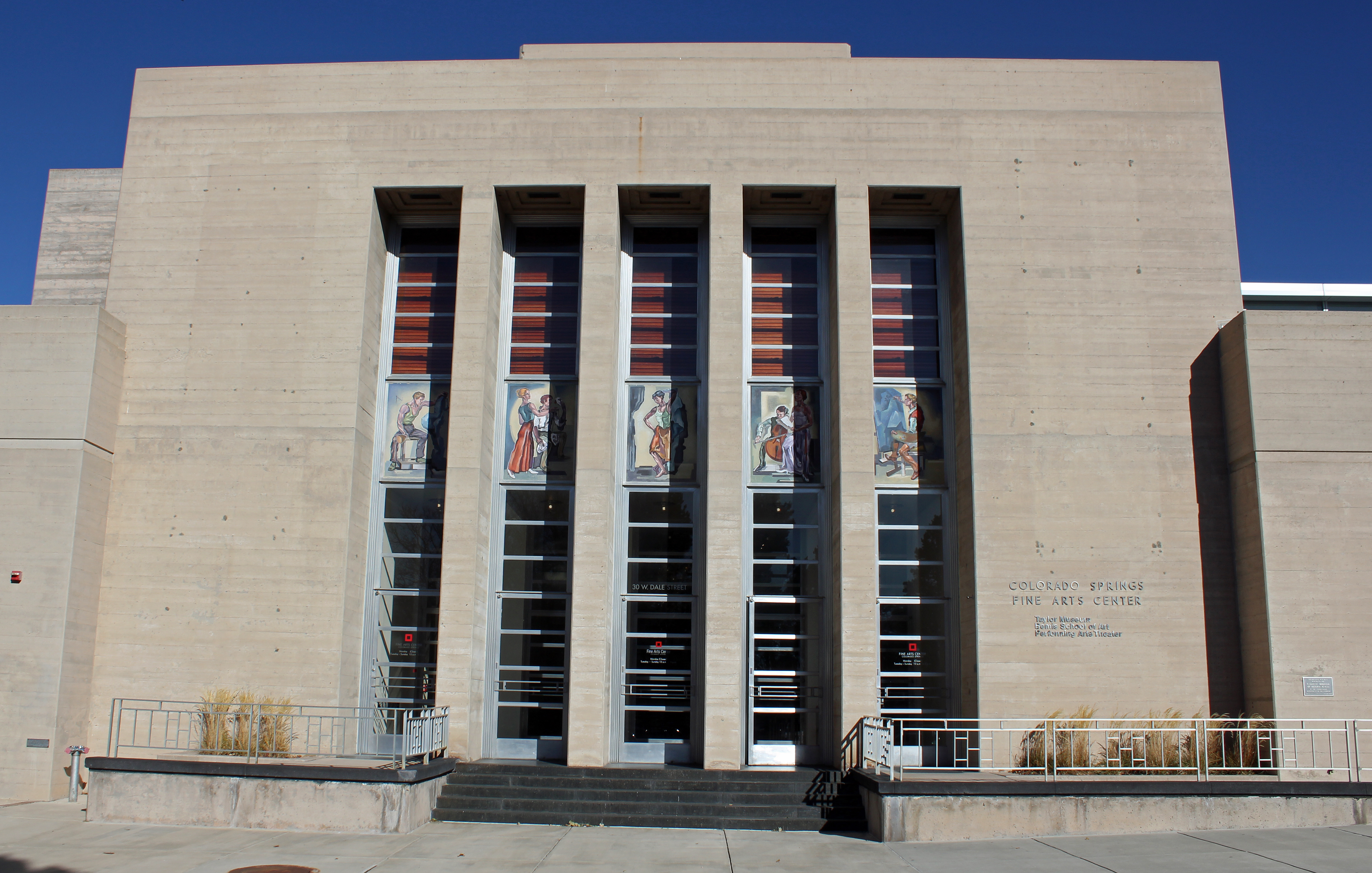
- The main entrance

- Location within Colorado Location within the United States
- Location: 30 W. Dale Street, Colorado Springs, Colorado, U.S.
- Coordinates: 38°50′45″N 104°49′32″W
- Area: 1.6 acres (0.65 ha)
- Built: 1936
- Architects: Meem, John Gaw; Rogers, Platt
- Architectural style: Art Deco
- Website: fac.coloradocollege.edu
- NRHP reference No.: 86001455
- Added to NRHP: July 3, 1986

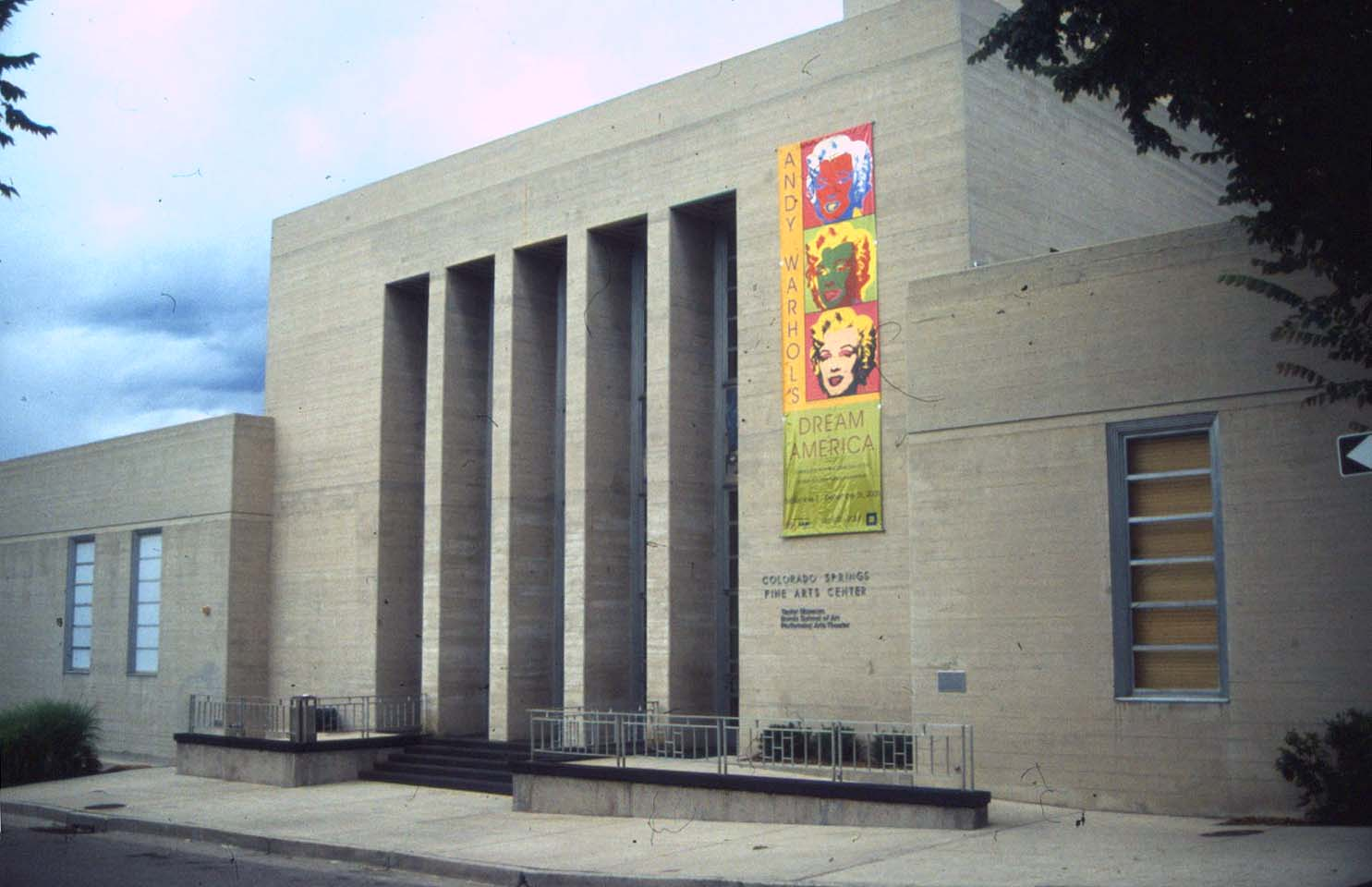

The Colorado Springs Fine Arts Center at Colorado College (FAC) is an arts center in Colorado Springs, Colorado, United States. Located on the same city block are the American Numismatic Association and part of the campus of Colorado College. The center uses a thick red outline of a square as its logo. It has been listed on the National Register of Historic Places since July 3, 1986, under the former name Colorado Springs Fine Arts Center.

== History ==
With $600,000, Alice Bemis Taylor funded the 1936 construction of the Colorado Springs Fine Arts Center and provided a $400,000 donation for an endowment. Constructed during the Great Depression, Taylor saw the project as a means of employment for unemployed laborers. Taylor donated her extensive Indian and Hispanic art and her collection of 6,000 volumes of Americana and appointed Mitchell Wilder as curator. She envisioned a place that would be accessible to all people, with no admission charge. The Broadmoor Art Academy previously stood on the grounds of the current art center, on land donated by Julie Penrose. Elizabeth Sage Hare also collaborated with Taylor and Penrose on the center, the nation's first combined art museum, art school and performing arts venue.

The Fine Arts Center was designed by New Mexico architect John Gaw Meem in a revolutionary design combining modernism and indigenous Pueblo style architecture Pueblo Revival Style and Spanish Colonial into "Santa Fe Style" architecture. In 1940, Meem's most modern design earned a Silver Medal at the Fifth Quadrennial Pan American Congress of Architecture. The building is listed on the National Register of Historic Places.

At the original Grand Opening in April 1936, Martha Graham performed Lamentation-Dance of Sorrow; Frank Lloyd Wright lectured about the building, Manuel de Falla performed an opera with life-size marionettes, and Alexander Calder created the stage design for a sung dialog, Eric Satie's "Socrate." Among the art school's instructors were Boardman Robinson, Adolf Dehn, and Jean Charlot.

On July 1, 2017, the FAC joined with Colorado College to become the Colorado Springs Fine Arts Center at Colorado College.

== Description ==
The Fine Arts Center is a modern poured concrete Pueblo-inspired structure that integrates Southwestern, Art Deco and Classic architectural elements. It has one, two and, for the theatre fly tower, four stories. Within the building are galleries, art studios, performing art facilities including a 400-seat theater, a music room, retail shop and storage and office space. The murals on the exterior of the building were produced by Boardman Robinson and Frank Mechau. The auditorium includes three aluminum relief panels over the doors depicting Pueblo and Hopi Indian Kachina masks, all by noted Denver sculptor, Arnold Rönnebeck, murals in the original theater lounge (now restaurant) by Andrew Dasburg, Kenneth Adams, and Ward Lockwood, and a downstairs lounge mural by Archie Musick.

For the National Register of Historic Places, it was described as follows:

Its monolithic pueblo massing, its undisguised modern use of concrete, aluminum and glass; its southwestern details, its Native American designs abstracted into Art Deco ornamentation; its streamlined elegance; and its classical proportions - all result in a timeless character - with fundamental roots to the region and the time as well as manifesting an innovative architectural reflection of the building's underlying function, which is to preserve culture and to honor the contemporary.

It borders Monument Valley Park and has a view of Pikes Peak. It is in the Historic Uptown neighborhood, a mixed-use residential and business area, and on the South side of the Colorado College campus. Its well-preserved state, reflects the initial building construction with maintenance and restoration.

== Arts center ==
The multi-purpose center includes:

- Art Museum - Several galleries, where the permanent collection of Southwest art is displayed, in addition to other permanent works as well as an annual calendar of curated and traveling shows.
- The Fine Arts Center Theatre Company produces comedies, dramas and musicals.
- Bemis School of Art offers art education to the local community, with classes for adults and children.
- A lounge with bar for special events.

Museum admission is free to FAC members, students (with ID), and teachers (with ID).

=== Notable pieces and exhibits ===
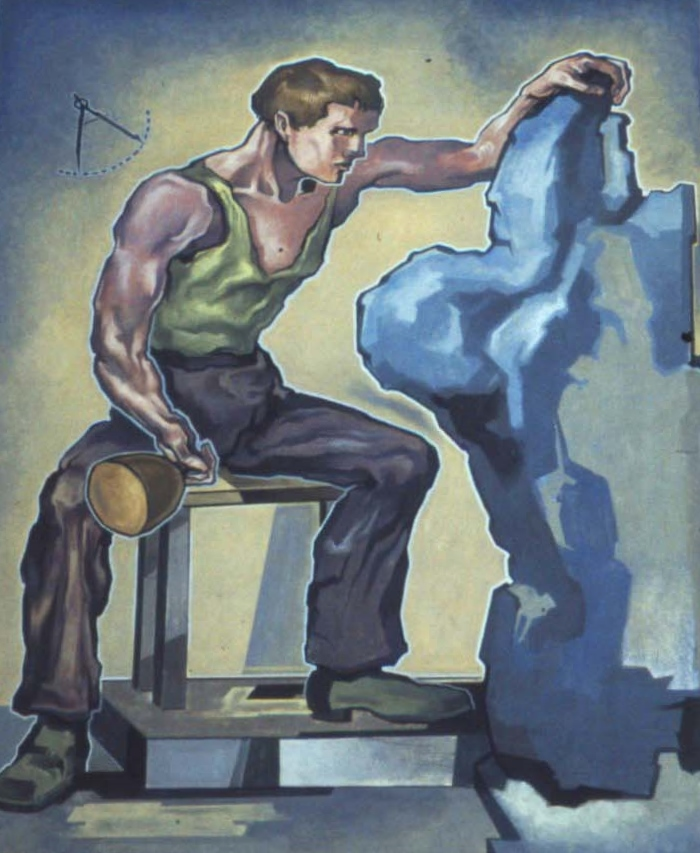
Mural on exterior of the Colorado Springs Fine Arts Center

- Dale Chihuly chandeliers.
- One of the country's "strongest collections" of Native American, Latin American and Hispanic American art.
- Notable artists within the FAC permanent collection include: John Singer Sargent, Georgia O'Keeffe, Richard Diebenkorn, Walt Kuhn, and Ansel Adams.

== Theater ==
The center was constructed with a performing arts theater. In 2006, the center was expanded by more than 48,000 square feet. A new wing was constructed adjacent to the Center's Bemis School of Art to add studio space for classrooms and rehearsal spaces for the theatre. A new building was constructed that provides additional exhibition space for the Center's museum. There are large expanses of gallery spaces reserved exclusively for American Indian, Latin American and American art. It was designed by architect David Tryba and built to American Alliance of Museums standards.

== Notable students ==
- Robert Beauchamp
- Eric Bransby
- Veronica Helfensteller
- James Duard Marshall
- Stanley Mullen, short story writer, novelist and publisher

== See also ==
- National Register of Historic Places listings in El Paso County, Colorado
