= Cynthia Brants =

American painter (1924–2006)

- Born: June 20, 1924; Fort Worth, Texas
- Died: January 11, 2006 (aged 81); Fort Worth, Texas
- Known for: Painting

Cynthia Brants (20 June 1924 – 11 January 2006) was an American artist and a member of the Fort Worth Circle of artists. She attended Saturday classes at the Fort Worth School of Fine Art from the age of 10, studying under Blanche McVeigh. After leaving Fort Worth Arlington Heights High School, Brants attended Madeira School, Greenway, Virginia and then majored in art at Sarah Lawrence College, Bronxville, New York. Here she studied under Kurt Roesch and met a number of European refugees who were working in the New York art world, including André Masson and Lyonel Feininger.

After graduation, Brants traveled around post-war Europe, and established her studio in Fort Worth.

From 1958 to 1962 she taught painting and drawing at Sarah Lawrence College.

In 1979 Brant moved to Granbury, Texas, where she worked as a scenic designer and painter during the renovation and re-opening of the Granbury Opera House.
