= Fort Worth Circle =

The Fort Worth Circle was a progressive art colony in Fort Worth, Texas. The colony was active during the 1940s and much of the 1950s and formed around younger artists, most of them native Texans under-30, who embraced themes not traditionally seen in Texas art up to that time. Through exhibitions and modest publicity these artists built statewide reputations during and after World War II as proponents of modern art. Social compatibility and shared affinities for modern art and classical music provided common ground among members of the circle and contributed to the group's cohesion. Within the circle's original membership, male and female artists were almost equally represented.

After World War II the Fort Worth Circle's influence expanded as younger artists became associated with the group and older members who no longer lived in Fort Worth retained their ties. Additionally, at the conclusion of World War II the ranks of Fort Worth's art community swelled with the return of artists who had served in the military. Some of these returning artists also became identified with the Fort Worth Circle. Membership changed over time, but the "backbone" of the colony consisted of Bill Bomar, Cynthia Brants, Veronica Helfensteller, Dickson Reeder, Flora Blanc Reeder, and Bror Utter.

The colony's presence was acknowledged by Dallas newspaper critic John Rosenfield in 1948 when he observed that a "school" of modern artists was at work in neighboring Fort Worth. Based on Rosenfield's characterization, the colony was long referred to by local residents as the Fort Worth School. Over time, "Fort Worth Circle" has replaced "Fort Worth School" as a more accurate summation of the colony's true nature.

== Origin, 1940-1944 ==
In its earliest incarnation, the Fort Worth Circle consisted of seven men and women who had known each other since public school days or as students at the Fort Worth School of Fine Arts, a local art academy founded in 1932. As enrollees at the Fort Worth School of Fine Arts, Lia Cuilty, Veronica Helfensteller, Marjorie Johnson, Sara Shannon and Bror Utter first met and exhibited together in the 1930s. Dickson Reeder and Bror Utter attended Fort Worth Central High School together in the late 1920s. As youngsters, Bill Bomar, Veronica Helfensteller and Dickson Reeder took private art lessons from the same teacher, Mrs. Sallie Blyth Mummert.

The Fort Worth Circle coalesced in 1940 around Dickson Reeder (1912-1970) and his wife, Flora Blanc Reeder (1916-1995). Edward Dickson Reeder was an aspiring portrait painter and Fort Worth native, while Blanc was a trained artist and actress and a native of New York City. In 1940, after three years of marriage, Reeder and Blanc selected Fort Worth as their permanent home. The Reeders were a charismatic and overtly social couple who had led an adventurous existence while living in Paris, France and New York. Upon the couple's arrival, Bill Bomar (1919-1991), Lia Cuilty (1908-1978), Veronica Helfensteller (1910-1964), Marjorie Johnson (1911-1997), Sara Shannon (1920-1996) and Bror Utter (1913–1993) were quickly drawn into the Reeders' social and professional orbit.

Painter Kelly Fearing (1918-2011) entered the Reeders' sphere in 1943 when he became a defense industry co-worker of Dickson Reeder.

Two regional art competitions, the Fort Worth Local Artists Show and the Texas General Exhibition, raised awareness of the Fort Worth Circle at a time when exhibition opportunities for Texas artists were limited. The Fort Worth Local Artists Show (established in 1939) and the Texas General Exhibition (established in 1940) were annual juried competitions created to showcase a select number of paintings, prints and sculptures by artists working at a high level. Cash prizes were often awarded to top entries. Numerous paintings by Fort Worth Circle artists were accepted into the Fort Worth Local Artists Show throughout the 1940s, and artworks by Circle artists dominated the awards. During World War II and afterwards, the Texas General Exhibition offered statewide exposure and attendant publicity for the art of Bill Bomar, Veronica Helfensteller, Dickson Reeder and Bror Utter.

The opening of Six Texas Painters at the Erhard Weyhe Gallery in New York City in 1944 marked the first time that media coverage portrayed members of the Fort Worth Circle as a "compatible and independent-minded group". Six Texas Painters was a month-long exhibition of thirty works by six young Texas artists, five of whom were from Fort Worth. The exhibition included five paintings each by Bill Bomar, Veronica Helfensteller, Dickson Reeder, Flora Blanc Reeder, and Bror Utter and opened to generally favorable reviews in the New York press. An essay in the Six Texas Painters exhibition catalogue put forward the idea that the Fort Worth group was "close knit" and represented "a small group of non-specific regionalists...(who) have known each other for years, have worked and painted together".

== Expansion, 1945-1950 ==
In 1945 the Reeder Children's School of Theater and Design was founded. For the next thirteen years this school served as a center of arts education for Fort Worth children ages four to fourteen. See Reeder Children's School. The school was operated by Dickson and Flora Reeder and relied on practical and creative assistance from the Reeder's pool of contacts in the local art community. Through play selection, set design, costuming and innovative musical accompaniment, the school's annual theatrical productions were seen by the public as an extension of the Fort Worth Circle's international aesthetic.

Cynthia Brants (1924-2006) returned to Fort Worth in 1945 with a degree in studio painting from Sarah Lawrence College and a desire to explore the limits of cubism. Brants, a former student at the Fort Worth School of Fine Arts, too became part of the Reeder's network. George Grammer (born 1928) became a student of Kelly Fearing at Texas Wesleyan College in 1945 and quickly proved himself to be one of Fearing's top art students. Fearing then introduced George Grammer to the Reeders. Cynthia Brants and George Grammer along with the Circle's older members (Bill Bomar, Lia Cuilty, Kelly Fearing, Veronica Helfensteller, Marjorie Johnson, Dickson Reeder, Flora Blanc Reeder, Sara Shannon and Bror Utter) "were fierce standard-bearers of all that was modern on the Fort Worth cultural scene".

Returning war veterans assumed a prominent role in the Fort Worth modernist movement in the late 1940s. Painters David Brownlow (1915-2008) and McKie Trotter (1918-1999), and sculptor Charles T. Williams (1918-1966), emerged as three of the most accomplished. They were viewed by the Circle's established members as peers.

During the Circle's heyday, Bill Bomar lived in New York City; however, he often returned to Texas and exhibited paintings regularly in Fort Worth. Bomar maintained studios in his parents home in Fort Worth and in the Chelsea Hotel in New York City. Marjorie Johnson left Fort Worth in 1943 when she joined the war effort as a U.S. Navy WAVE. Johnson settled in New York City after World War II and attended the Art Students League but, like Bomar, continued to exhibit paintings in Fort Worth. A solo exhibit of Johnson's most recent abstract paintings was held in Fort Worth in 1949.

Kelly Fearing accepted a teaching position on the art faculty at the University of Texas at Austin in 1947. In Austin he fashioned a forty-year career as a fine artist and university educator. Fearing remained a revered figure among Fort Worth collectors and often returned to the city. Veronica Helfensteller left Fort Worth for Santa Fe, New Mexico in 1948, where she was often visited by her Texas contemporaries.

== Beyond 1950 ==
The professional and social ties that formed between Fort Worth Circle artists in the 1940s continued to bind them in the 1950s, even though some no longer lived in Texas. Painter Sara Shannon and her husband moved to New York City, followed by George Grammer and his new bride in 1954. By relocating to New York, Grammer and Shannon joined Bill Bomar and Marjorie Johnson. Together, Bomar, Grammer, Johnson and Shannon formed a cell of Fort Worth expatriates who remained close to their Fort Worth Circle peers and sometimes hosted them on visits to New York. Bill Bomar obtained permanent gallery representation in New York through the Erhard Weyhe Gallery on Lexington Avenue.

In 1951, Betty McLean founded the first contemporary art gallery in Dallas, The Betty McLean Gallery. Six of her original stable of nine artists were members of the Fort Worth Circle. The six who were represented by Betty McLean Gallery were Bill Bomar, Cynthia Brants, Kelly Fearing, George Grammer, Dickson Reeder and Bror Utter.

Knoedler Galleries included works by Bomar, Brants, Cuilty, Dickson Reeder and Utter in a large show of contemporary Texas painting held in New York City in 1952.

A focus of Fort Worth Circle artists who remained in Fort Worth was the establishment of a public art museum. In pursuit of this goal "they decorated debutante balls, gave works for auction, and spoke or demonstrated before civic and service clubs." In 1954, their goal was realized with the opening of The Fort Worth Art Center, the city's first free-standing public art museum.

== Art ==
As young people, artists of the Fort Worth Circle painted conservatively and "shared a focus on rural, small-town, and, sometimes, urban life, tinged with the measured optimism that accompanied difficult times". Still life images, old Victorian houses, farm scenes, depictions of the Louisiana and north Texas countryside, and Fort Worth street scenes were typical subject matter of early paintings by Cuilty, Fearing, Grammer, Helfensteller, Johnson and Utter. Early works by Dickson Reeder were figural, reflecting his desire to become a portrait painter. By the late 1930s, exposure to "an increasingly expanded range of aesthetic choices offered by the rich veins of abstract and surreal art that emanated from Paris and the expanding art scene in New York City" offered the artists of Fort Worth viable alternatives to the art they had known in their youth.

The Shannon Children, a surrealist portrait by Dickson Reeder, won First Prize in the Fort Worth Local Artists Show in 1941 and set a standard for "eccentric originality" that Reeder's peers in the Fort Worth Circle soon followed. With The Shannon Children as a baseline, over the next several years artists of the Fort Worth Circle "produced numerous figural studies set in imaginary space".

By 1942, imaginative figure paintings and quasi-abstract landscape images started to dominate the art of Bror Utter. By the mid-1940s, Utter began to aggressively explore biomorphic abstraction, an aesthetic that combined organic or vaguely human shapes with fanciful colors. Sometimes Utter combined abstract shapes and beautifully drawn human figures in the same painting.

Veronica Helfensteller, Marjorie Johnson and Bror Utter were the only members of the Fort Worth Circle to actively study lithography, and only Helfensteller embraced the medium long-term. Helfensteller was a three-time prizewinner in lithography in the Annual Texas Print Exhibition in Dallas. Helfensteller was also proficient in etching and, in 1944, initiated weekly etching sessions in her studio. Out of these sessions, with Dickson Reeder and Flora Blanc Reeder leading the way, grew a body of modern, experimental prints that placed the Fort Worth Circle's vision "closer in species to the art practiced by the American and European avant-garde in New York prior to the ascension of Abstract Expressionism in the 1950s". The hallmark of most of the Fort Worth Circle's prints was the use of soft ground etching, a technique taught to Dickson Reeder and Flora Blanc Reeder by Paris-based master printmaker Stanley William Hayter.

Bill Bomar revealed a serious interest in abstraction when he entered Cat in Portia's Garden in the 1944 Local Artists Show and won First Prize for oil painting. By 1947, Bomar was producing high-level non-objective art in the oil paint medium. Dickson Reeder was awarded a solo exhibition of his most recent figural work in 1946 by the Fort Worth Art Association. Bror Utter became a three-time winner of the Fort Worth Local Artists Show, winning First Prize for painting in 1942, 1946 and 1949. Utter's pursuit of biomorphic abstraction between 1946 and 1948 earned wide notice and an observation from Dallas newspaper critic Patricia Peck that "Mr. Utter shows the most consistent growth and development of any of his colleagues". Marjorie Johnson was the subject of a large solo exhibition in 1949 when the Fort Worth Art Association arranged for Johnson to return from New York and put thirty-two of her most recent abstract oil paintings on exhibit.

Cynthia Brants utilized interlocking fields of color to construct oil paintings of great complexity. Cubist-inspired paintings by Brants won First Prize in the Fort Worth Local Artists Show in 1950, 1952 and 1956. She was awarded solo exhibitions in 1950 and 1964 by the Fort Worth Art Association. After revelatory trips to Italy, the first taken in 1953, Bror Utter became a student of architecture. Based on his Italian observations, Utter developed a unique pictorial approach that broke solid structures such as buildings and columns into intersecting planes. Utter's architectural imagery was the subject of a large retrospective in 1961, sponsored by the Fort Worth Art Association.

The art of the Fort Worth Circle has been the subject of three museum exhibitions, and several smaller exhibits, since 1986. Beyond Regionalism: The Fort Worth School (1945-1955) was organized by the Old Jail Art Center in Albany, Texas in 1986. Prints of the Fort Worth Circle, 1940-1960 was organized by the Archer M. Huntington Art Gallery at the University of Texas in Austin in 1992. In 2008, Intimate Modernism: Fort Worth Circle Artists in the 1940s was organized by the Amon Carter Museum of American Art in Fort Worth, Texas.
