= Old Jail Art Center =

Art and regional history museum in Albany, Texas

- Exterior of the Old Jail Art Center

- Location within Texas Location within the United States
- Established: 1980
- Location: Albany, Texas, United States
- Coordinates: 32°43′23″N 99°17′41″W
- Type: Art museum Local history museum
- Accreditation: American Alliance of Museums
- Visitors: 12,000 (2019)
- Founders: Reilly Nail; Bill Bomar
- Employees: 7 (full time)
- Website: theojac.org
- Old Jail Art Center
- U.S. Historic district – Contributing property
- Recorded Texas Historic Landmark
- Location within Texas Location within the United States
- Built: 1878
- Architect: John Thomas; Arthur Weinman
- Architectural style: Late Victorian
- Part of: Shackelford County Courthouse Historic District (ID76002065)

Significant dates
- Designated CP: July 30, 1976
- Designated RTHL: 1962

The Old Jail Art Center (OJAC) is an art and regional history museum in Albany, Texas. It is housed in a former jail that was completed in 1878. After being replaced by a new jail in 1929, the old jail building was saved from demolition by local author and playwright Robert E. Nail Jr. in 1940. In 1980, the OJAC was established in the building by his nephew, local author and former television producer Reilly Nail, and Reilly's cousin, artist Bill Bomar.

The OJAC's permanent collection includes over 2,200 drawings, paintings, prints, and sculptures. Its collection strengths include modern British art, the Fort Worth Circle, the Taos Moderns, Asian art, pre-Columbian art, and the contemporary art of Texas. The OJAC also actively preserves regional history and is home to the Green Art Research Library, the Robert E. Nail Jr. Archives, and an oral history project.

== History ==
The OJAC is housed in a former jail, the first such structure built in Shackelford County, Texas. Designed by architect John Thomas of Fort Worth-based Woerner, Builders, the limestone building was constructed between 1877 and 1878 at a cost in excess of $9,000 (equivalent to $300,000 in 2025). Considered to be state of the art when completed, the jail was in use for over 50 years before it was replaced by a newer building one block west of it in 1929. In 1940, local author and playwright Robert E. Nail Jr. saved the old jail from demolition buying it for $25 (equivalent to $570 in 2025) and turning it into his writing studio. He purchased the lot itself a few months later for $325 (equivalent to $7,470 in 2025). The jail was designated a Recorded Texas Historic Landmark in 1962. In 1968, local author and former television producer Reilly Nail inherited the building from his uncle Robert. In 1976, it was added to the National Register of Historic Places as a contributing property to the Shackelford County Courthouse Historic District, largely because the jail was considered an exemplar of 19th-century architecture.

Reilly Nail and his cousin Bill Bomar, who was an artist, established the OJAC museum in the old jail building in 1980. They began with four collections: their own personal collections, which both consisted of 20th-century art, and their mothers' respective collections, which were both made up of Asian art. These four collections, which were initially displayed in four small galleries in the old jail, formed the backbone of what would become the permanent collection. Since 1989, the OJAC has been accredited by the American Alliance of Museums.

Additions to the OJAC have been made in 1984, 1996, and 2009. In 2016, the Robert E. Nail Jr. Archives were created. All four of these additions were designed by Fort Worth-based architect Arthur Weinman. Together, these additions have expanded the entire footprint of the museum to 17,000 square feet (1,600 m^{2}). By 2019, the OJAC boasted 12,000 visitors per year, seven full-time employees, and an endowment of $13 million.

== Collections ==
The permanent collection of the OJAC includes over 2,200 drawings, paintings, prints, and sculptures. Among the more prominent artists whose works are included are Alexander Calder, Francisco Goya, Paul Klee, John Marin, Amedeo Modigliani, Henry Moore, Pablo Picasso, Rembrandt, Pierre-Auguste Renoir, and Grant Wood. The OJAC's collection strengths include modern British art, the Fort Worth Circle, the Taos Moderns, and the William O. Gross Pre-Columbian Collection. Other areas of focus include Asian art, pre-Columbian art, and the contemporary art of Texas. Among the most significant individual works of art in the collection are the ancient Chinese terracotta tomb figures that were originally part of Jewel Nail Bomar's collection. The Marshall R. Young Sculpture Courtyard on the grounds of the OJAC consists of over 20 sculptures, including the works of Pericle Fazzini, Jesús Bautista Moroles, and Charles Williams.

Saddles belonging to local rancher Watt Reynolds on display at the OJAC

Writing for The Texas Observer, Christopher Collins called the OJAC "one of the best and quirkiest art collections in the state". In Fort Worth Weekly, James Russell lauded it as one of the rural art museums in Texas that are "avidly and passionately" collecting the state's regional art. Joe Holley, writing for Texas Monthly, called it "one of the finest small-town museums in the country".

Although primarily an art museum focused on visual arts, the OJAC also actively preserves regional history. It is home to the Sallie Reynolds Matthews historical collection and the Watt Mathews Ranching collection. Together, these collections consist of artifacts, books, and furniture, and they document area ranches as well as regional history. The OJAC is also home to the Green Art Research Library, a non-circulating library with 3,000 books including artist biographies and works of art criticism and art history. The museum's Robert E. Nail Jr. Archives contain the personal and professional papers of artists included in the collections as well as genealogical resources. The OJAC is also home to SPOKEN: The Ardon B. Judd, Jr. Oral History Project, which documents the lives of residents of Albany and surrounding communities. Starting in 2018, it also began producing a series of mini documentaries.

== Exhibitions ==
The OJAC has held exhibitions of the work of artists including Helen Altman, Bill Bomar, Deborah Butterfield, Blanche McVeigh, Linda Ridgway, and Bror Alexander Utter. Lauren Smart, writing for the Dallas Observer, described the museum as hosting "high caliber exhibitions of artists from across Texas and beyond".

== See also ==
- List of Recorded Texas Historic Landmarks (Sabine-Travis)
