= Max Fischer (art collector) =

German art collector and historian (1893-1954)

- Born: 1893
- Died: 1954
- Occupations: Historian, art collector
- Known for: art collection, restitutions
- Notable work: Brücke, Erich Heckel, Ernst Kirchner, Blauer Reiter

Max Fischer (1893–1954) was a German art collector and historian.

== Life and work ==
Fischer was born in 1893 and grew up in Frankfurt since 1899. His parents Ludwig (1860-1922) and Rosy Fischer (1869-1926) had built up a large collection of German Expressionist paintings since 1905. After the death of their parents, Max and his brother Ernst (1896-1981) inherited the collection of over 500 paintings in equal parts. With a doctorate in history, he worked as a journalist and foreign correspondent for various newspapers and magazines as well as for radio.

== Art collection, Nazi persecution and restitution ==
With the rise of Nazi persecution, Max Fischer fled Germany in 1935, leaving part of his art collection behind. When Max Fischer died in 1954, his brother Ernst joined his already initiated compensation proceedings as the sole heir.

The state of Baden-Württemberg decided unanimously on December 10, 2020 to recommend the restitution of the painting "Geschwister" by Erich Heckel to Fischer's heirs.

“Sand Hills (Bei Gruenau),” by Ernst Kirchner, which Fischer had owned since 1926, entered the collection of Kurt Feldhäusser, a Nazi in 1938 in unclear circumstances before entering the collection of the Museum of Modern Art in New York. A settlement concerning the restitution was reached between Fischer and the MoMa in 2015.

== Literature ==
- Frederick R. Brandt, German Expressionist Art: The Ludwig and Rosy Fischer Collection
- Frederick Brandt, German Expressionist Art. Selections from the Ludwig and Rosy Fischer Collection, Virginia Museum of Fine Arts, 1987
