= Shearjashub Spooner =

American physician and writer

Shearjashub Spooner (December 3, 1809 – March 14, 1859) was an American medical doctor and writer.

Born in Brandon, Vermont, he graduated as a medical doctor in Middlebury in 1830 and New York City, in 1835, he became a dentist in New York.

He retired in 1858, and died in Plainfield, New Jersey.

== Works ==
- Guide to Sound Teeth (New York, 1836)
- Art of Manufacturing Mineral Teeth (1837)
- Treatise on Surgical and Mechanical Dentistry (1838)
- Anecdotes of Painters, Engravers, Sculptors, and Architects, and Curiosities of Art (3 volumes, 1853)
- Spooner, Shearjashub (1873). A Biographical History of the Fine Arts, Being Memoirs of the Lives and Works of Eminent Painters, Sculptors and Architects. Philadelphia: G. Gebbie. p. 527. (1853; new edition, 2 volumes, 1865)
