= Weyhe Gallery =

Art gallery

Weyhe Gallery, established in 1919 in New York City, is an art gallery specializing in prints. It is now located in Mount Desert, Maine.

== History ==
Erhard Weyhe (1883–1972) established the Weyhe Gallery in 1919. He also operated a bookstore, the Weyhe bookstore, at the same location at 794 Lexington Avenue. Weyhe had immigrated to the United States from England just before the start of World War I. By 1923, he had bought the brownstone building on Lexington Avenue that would house the Gallery until 1994.

The Weyhe Gallery published prints singly or in portfolios. It emphasized emerging artists, and it was a prominent institution in the American art world in the first half of the 20th century. Modernist artists were among its early popular exhibitors:

Carl Zigrosser, its manager for many years, recalled that patrons like Lewis Mumford, Frank Crowninshield, Alfred Lunt and Jo Mielziner bought books and prints by the gallery's circle of artists, among them Rockwell Kent, Louis Lozowick, Aristide Maillol, Gaston Lachaise, Wanda Gág, J.J. Lankes, John Sloan, Reginald Marsh, Adolf Dehn, and Diego Rivera.

In 1991, David Kiehl, associate curator of prints and photographs at the Metropolitan Museum of Art, called the building "a shrine for modern art," describing "early exhibits of the German Expressionists, of Matisse, of Picasso, of Mexican and African art".

Weyhe also published an art magazine, The Checkerboard.

The gallery's first director was Carl Zigrosser, who continued in this role until 1940. Erhard Weyhe's daughter, Gertrude Dennis, operated the gallery and book store after his death in 1972 until her death in 2003. At that time, the New York City establishment closed its doors, and it was relocated to Mount Desert, Maine. Deborah Kiley, Weyhe's granddaughter, is the current owner of the Weyhe Gallery and the book store, Weyhe Art Books.

The current incarnation of the Weyhe Gallery maintains collections in the following areas: 19th century European, American Pre-1950, Classic Modernism, and American Regionalism. Among the many artists represented in its collections are John James Audubon, George Grosz, Henri Matisse, Pablo Picasso, Käthe Kollwitz, Max Weber, Raoul Dufy, Diego Rivera, Levon West, Lovis Corinth and Angelo Pinto.

The files of the Weyhe Gallery from 1919 to 1994 are part of the research collections of the Smithsonian's Archives of American Art.

== Nazi-looted art and restitution cases ==
In 2015 the Museum of Modern Art in New York restituted “Sand Hills” by Ernst Ludwig Kirchner, to the heirs of Max Fischer. MoMa had acquired the painting in 1949 from the Weyhe Gallery which had it on consignment from the estate of Nazi party member, Kurt Feldhausser.

In 2018 the Solomon R. Guggenheim Foundation restituted a painting by German Expressionist Ernst Ludwig Kirchner, Artillerymen, 1915. to the heirs of the German Jewish art dealer Alfred Flechtheim. The painting had been consigned to the Wehye by the mother of Kurt Feldhausser.

In 2024, the New York Times revealed that a Chagall painting that the Museum of Modern Art had acquired through Weyhe from the Feldhausser estate had been quietly restituted to the heirs of the Matthiesen Gallery, and that the deaccessioning involved a payment of four million dollars to the museum. The painting, Over Vitbesk, had been the object of public provenance research efforts by the museum which had previously stated that the Matthiesen transfer was a repayment for debt, and not related to Nazi persecution of the Jews.

== See also ==
- Modernism
- Printmaking
- List of claims for restitution for Nazi looted art
