= Modern Art Museum of Fort Worth =

Art museum in Texas, United States

Coordinates: 32°44′57″N 97°21′47″W

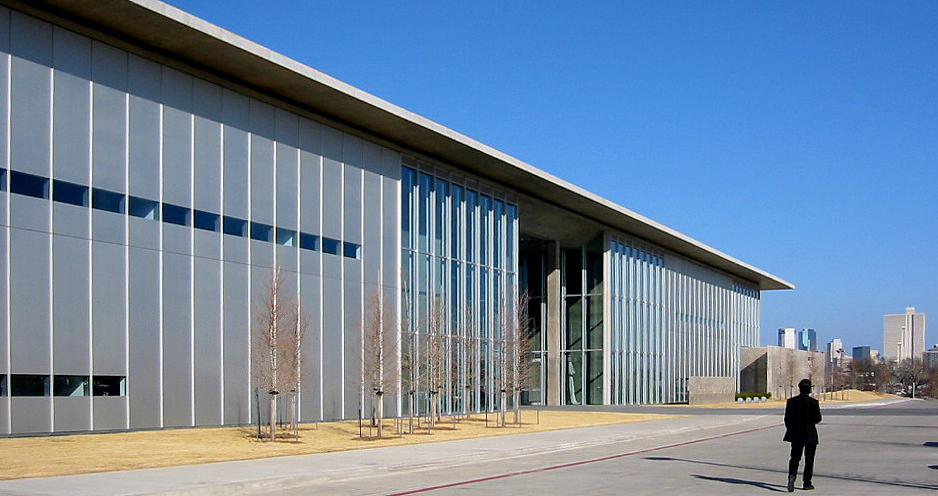
- Former name: Fort Worth Art Museum Fort Worth Art Center Fort Worth Museum of Art Fort Worth Art Association Art Gallery of the Carnegie Public Library
- Established: 1892
- Location: 3200 Darnell Street; Fort Worth, Texas 76107; United States
- Type: Art museum
- Accreditation: American Alliance of Museums
- Collections: Modern and Contemporary Art
- Directors: Halona Norton-Westbrook, PhD
- Architect: Tadao Ando
- Website: www.themodern.org

The Modern Art Museum of Fort Worth (widely referred to as The Modern) is an art museum of post-World War II art in Fort Worth, Texas with a collection of international modern and contemporary art. Founded in 1892, The Modern is located in the city's cultural district in a building designed by architect Tadao Ando which opened to the public in 2002. The museum is accredited by the American Alliance of Museums and holds a permanent collection with more than 3,000 works of art.

== About ==
=== History ===
The Modern Art Museum of Fort Worth was first granted a Charter from the State of Texas in 1892 as the "Fort Worth Public Library and Art Gallery", evolving through several name changes and different facilities in Fort Worth. The mission of the museum is "collecting, presenting and interpreting international developments in post-World War II art in all media."

=== Architecture ===
The museum's current building was designed by Japanese architect Tadao Ando and opened to the public on Saturday, December 14, 2002. Michael Auping, (chief curator at the museum from 1993 - 2017), worked closely with Ando during the five-year design process to ensure that the interior spaces would also meet the display needs of the curators and artists. The building features three long pavilions set into a reflecting pond and provides 53,000 square feet (4,900 m^{2}) of gallery space for exhibitions. In 2019, the building was selected as the Best Designed Building in Texas by Architectural Digest. Ando's structure is located within the city's Cultural District, home to the adjacent Kimbell Art Museum and the Amon Carter Museum.

=== Collections ===
The Modern Art Museum of Fort Worth maintains one of the foremost collections of international modern and contemporary art in the central United States. The majority of works in the collection are dated from 1945 to the present. Various movements, themes, and styles are represented, including abstract expressionism, color field painting, pop art, and minimalism, as well as aspects of new image painting from the 1970s and beyond, recent developments in abstraction and figurative sculpture, and contemporary movements in photography, video, and digital imagery.

The Permanent Collection includes more than 3,000 works with pieces by Pablo Picasso, Philip Guston, Anselm Kiefer, Robert Motherwell, Robert Rauschenberg, Martin Puryear, Jackson Pollock, Susan Rothenberg, Gerhard Richter, Richard Serra, Mark Rothko, Agnes Martin, Cindy Sherman, Francis Bacon, Ellsworth Kelly, Roy Lichtenstein, Carrie Mae Weems, Jenny Holzer, Donald Judd, Joan Mitchell, Lynda Benglis, Laurie Simmons, David Hockney, and Andy Warhol.

The Modern has grown their collection with acquisitions of major works from key contemporary American and international artists including Kaws, Kehinde Wiley, Martine Gutierrez, Lorna Simpson, Mark Bradford, Alex Da Corte, Mexican-American artist Vincent Valdez, Japanese artist Takashi Murakami, Nigerian-born artist Njideka Akunyili Crosby, Mexican conceptual artist Mario García Torres, Iranian-born artist Kamrooz Aram, German sculptor and photographer Thomas Demand, South Korean artist Do Ho Suh, and Kenyan-American visual artist Wangechi Mutu.

== Gallery ==
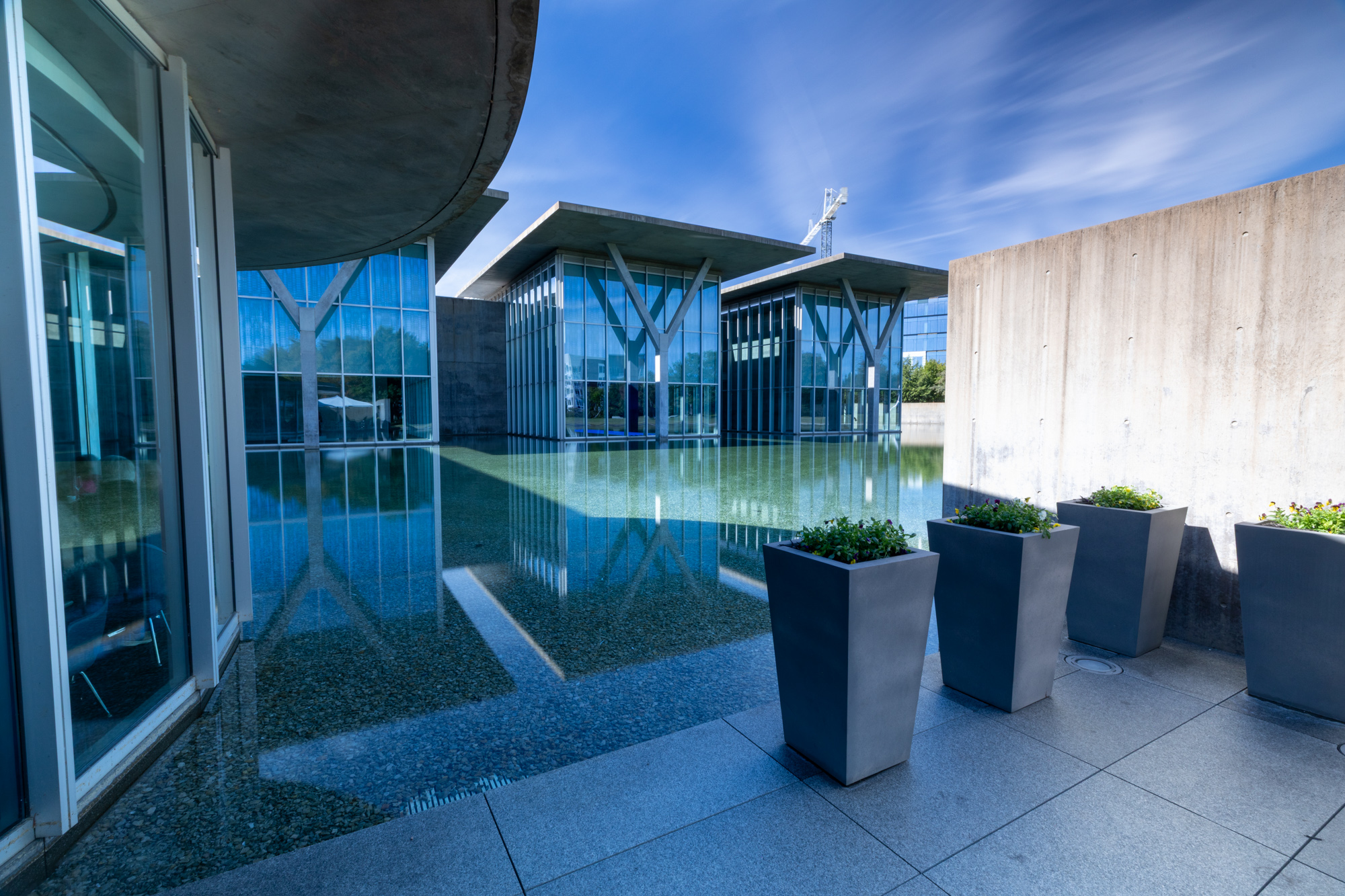
Courtyard of the Modern Art Museum of Fort Worth

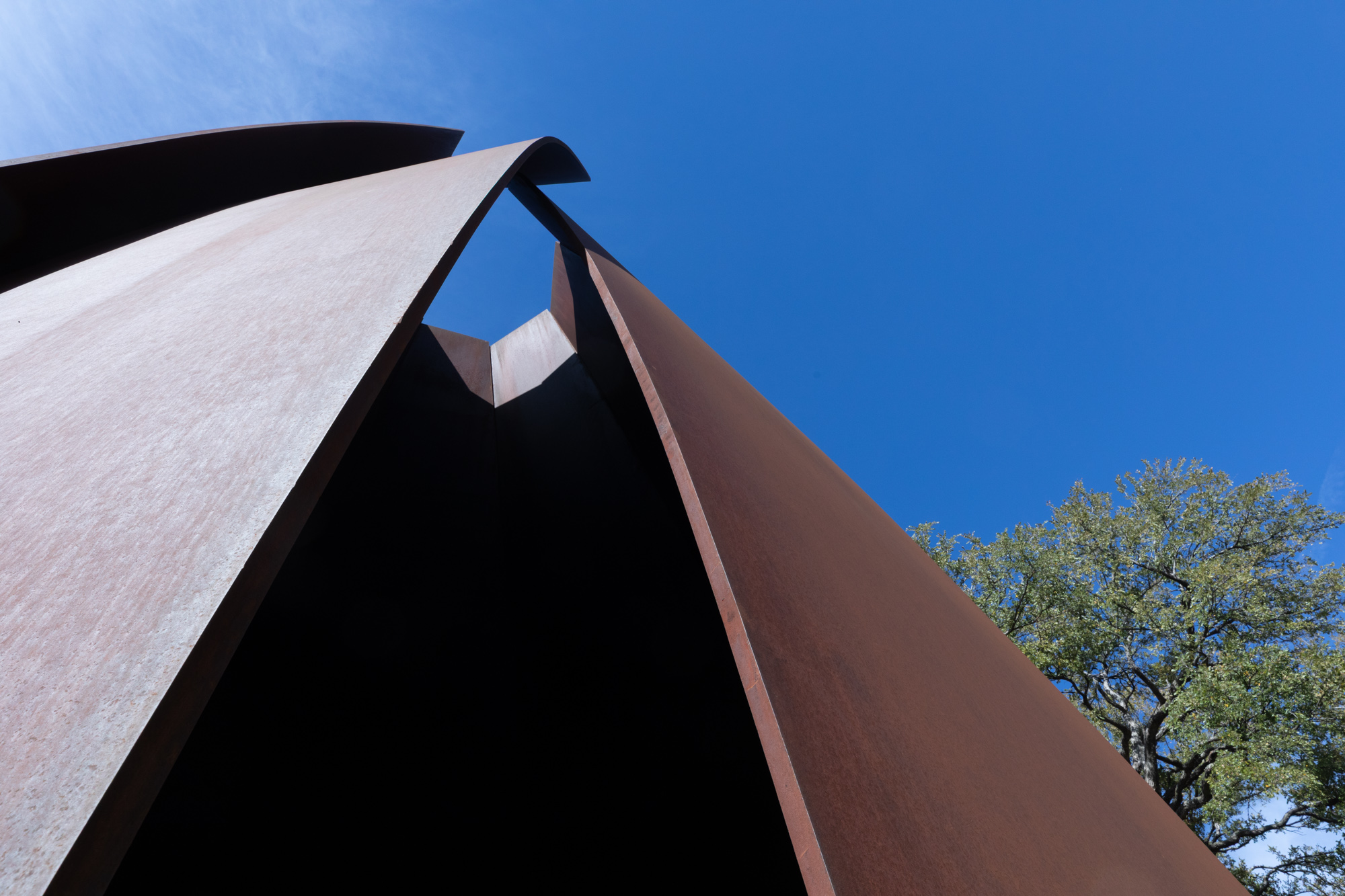
Art installation outside Modern Art Museum of Fort Worth

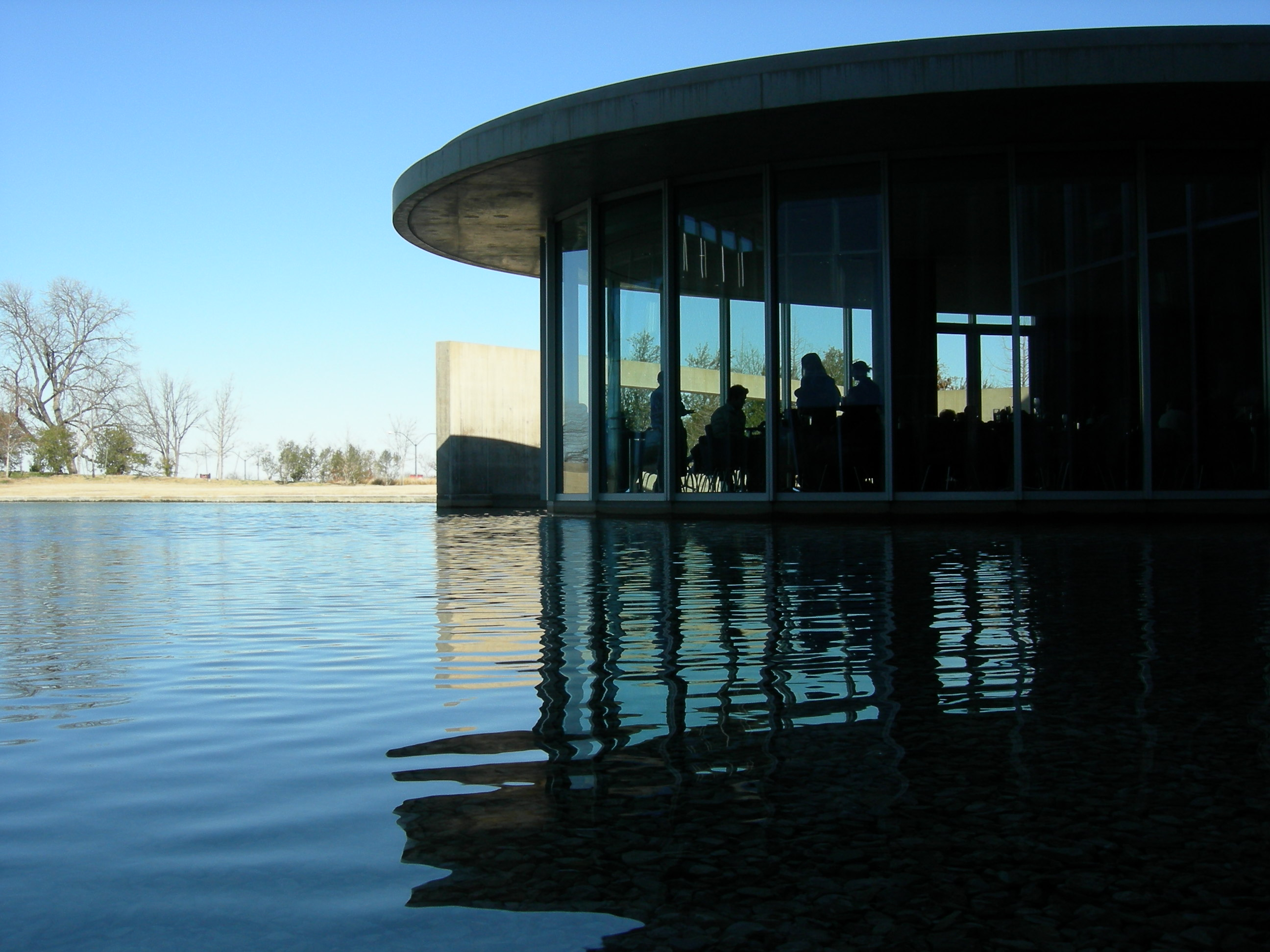
Restaurant

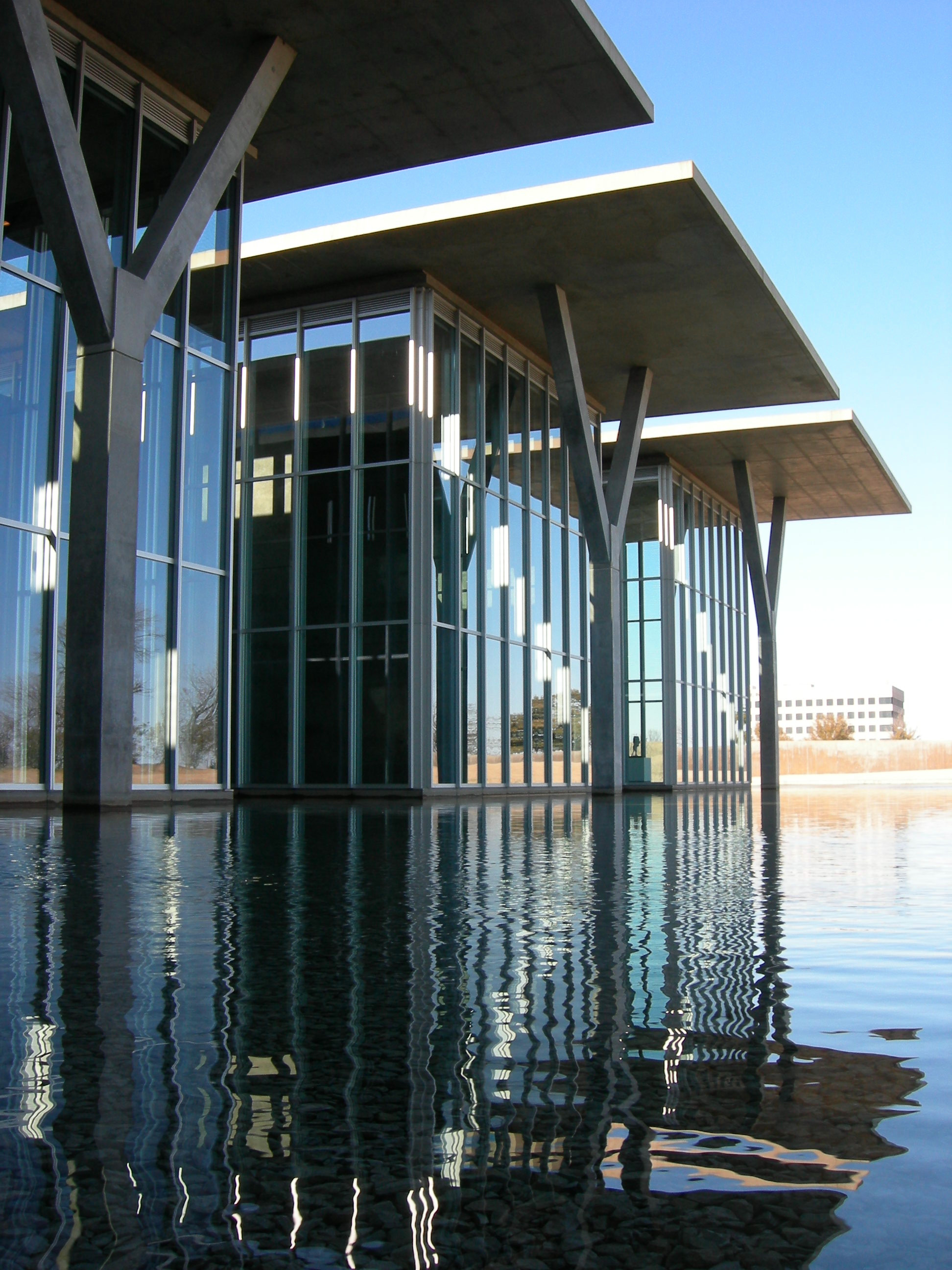
Galleries

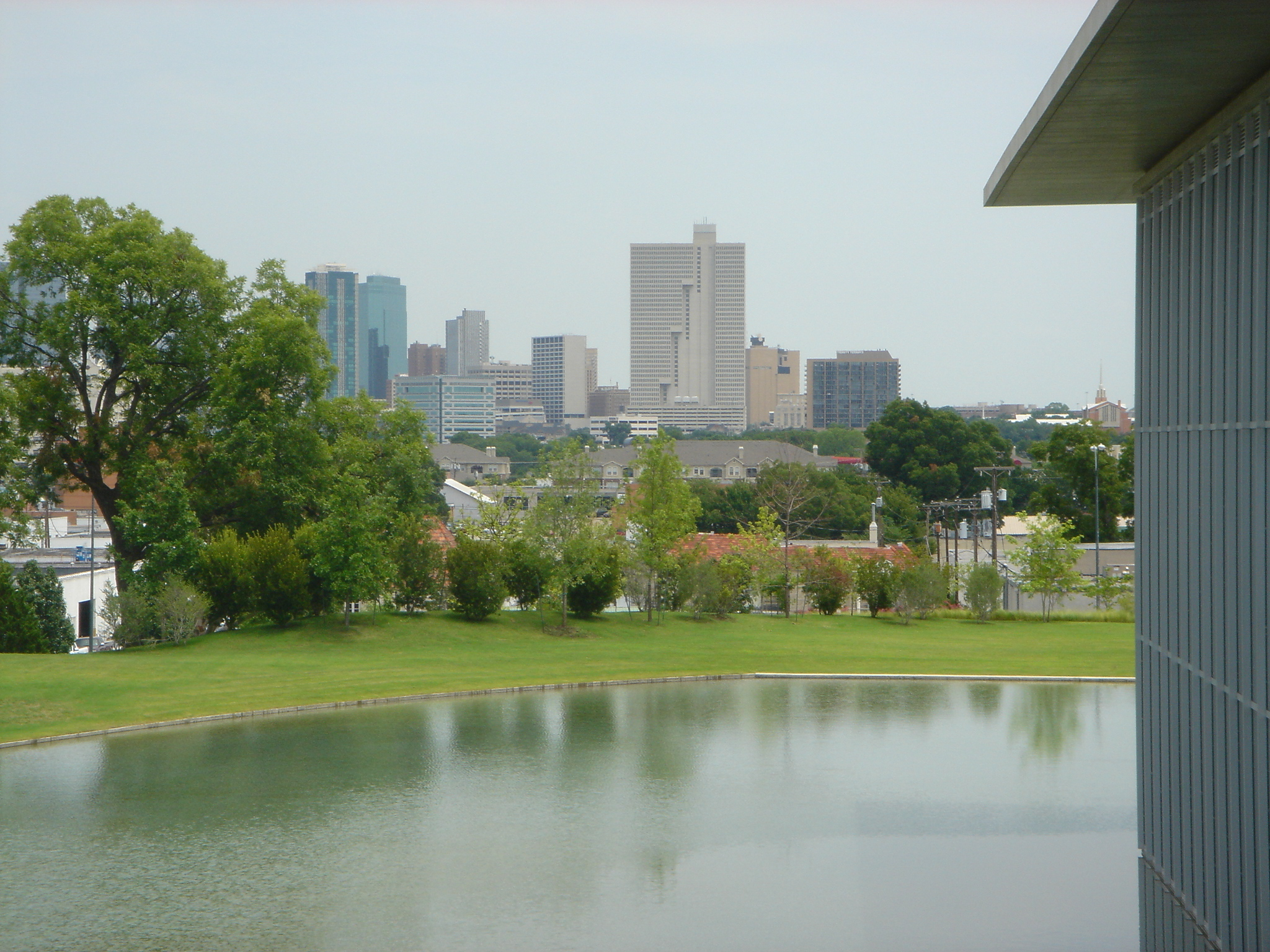
View from museum looking over reflecting pool toward downtown Fort Worth.

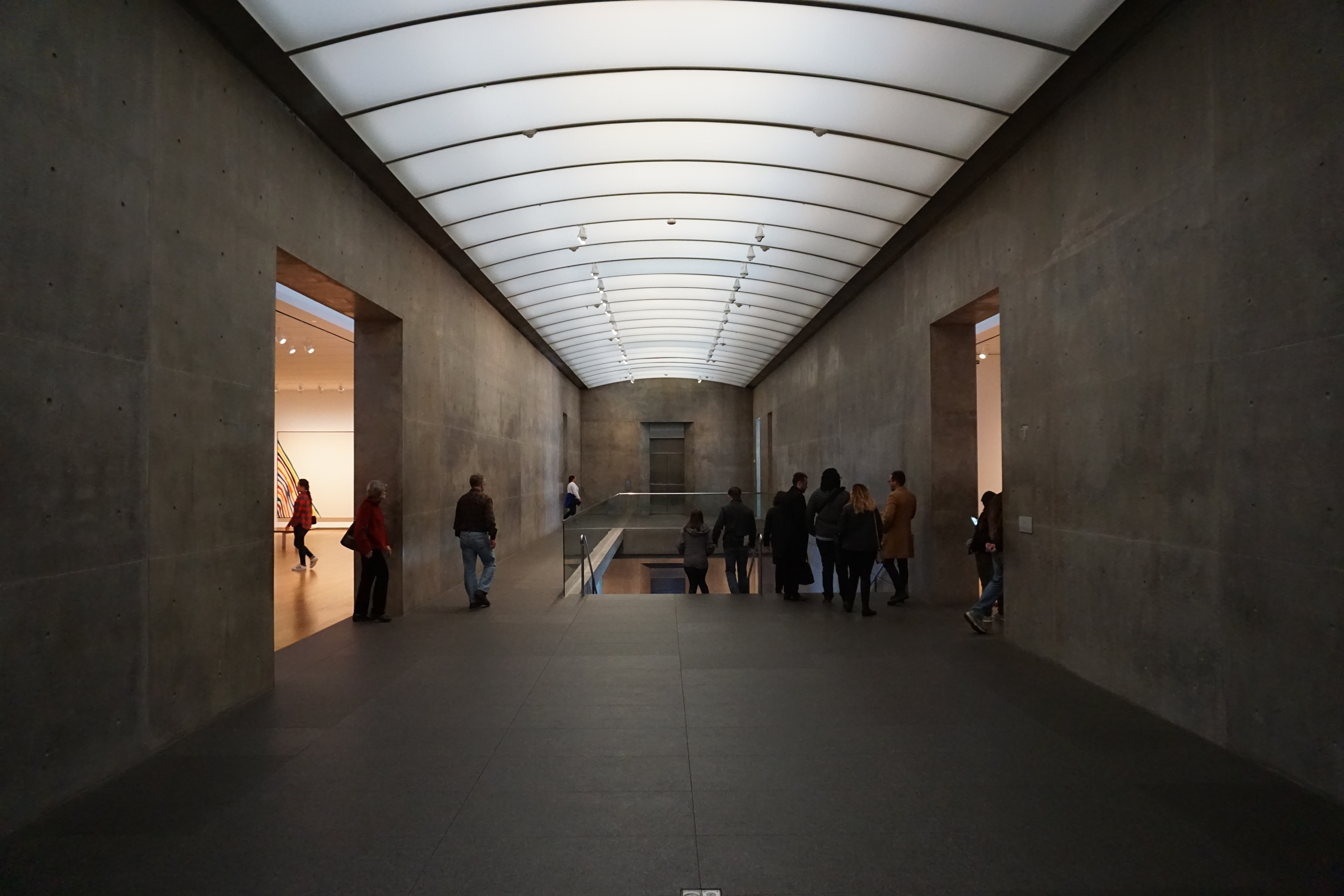
Interior

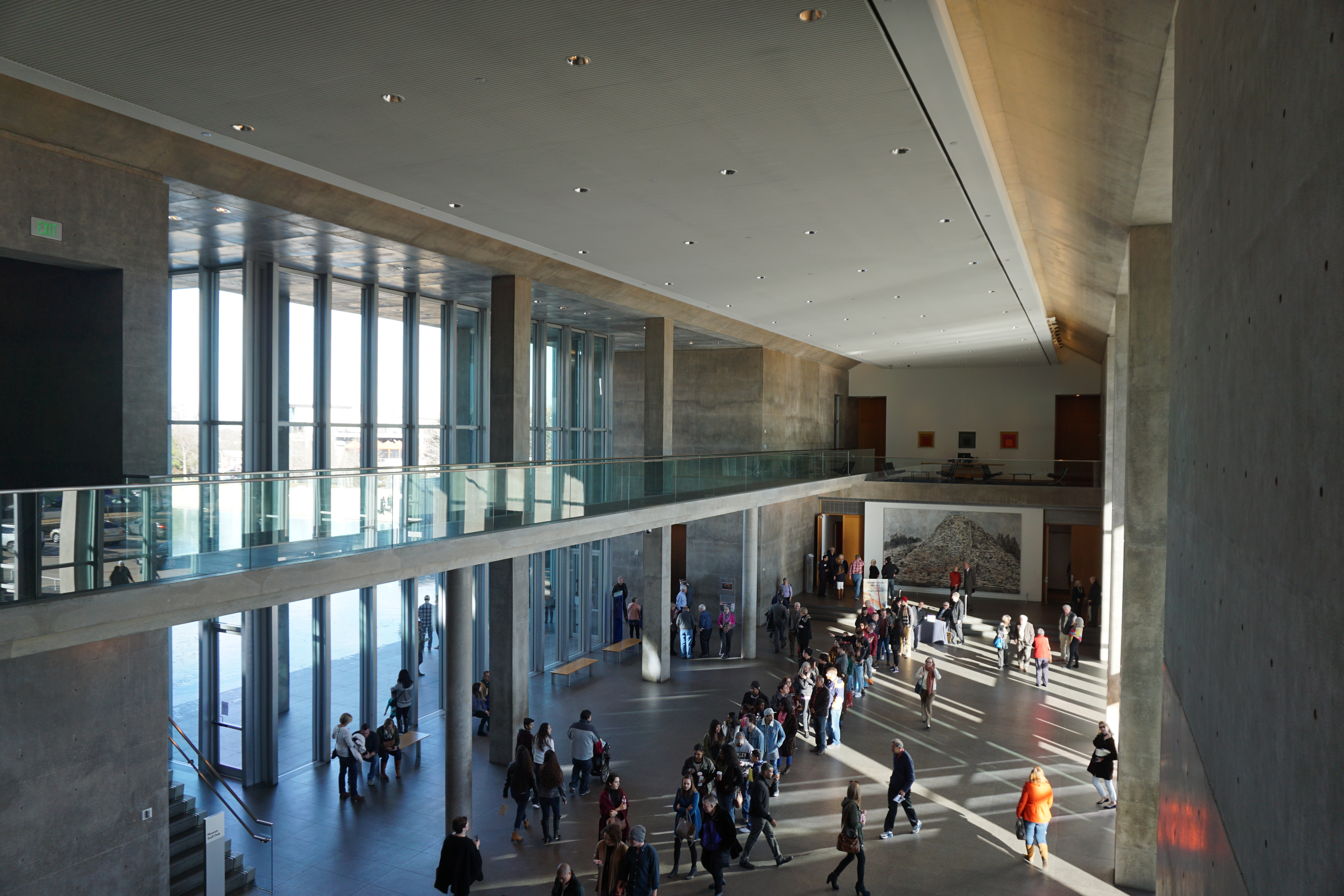
Interior
