= Janet E. Turner =

American artist

Janet E. Turner (1914–1988) was an American artist known for her printmaking.

== Early life and education ==
Turner was born in Kansas City, Missouri on April 7, 1914. From 1932 to 1936, she attended Stanford University where she became interested in art and majored in Far Eastern History. After graduation, she travelled in Japan and became interested in Asian printmaking techniques. She studied at the Kansas City Art Institute from 1936 to 1941, where she was a student of famed realist painter Thomas Hart Benton. She also studied lithography under John de Martelly.

== Career ==
Benton's influence is evident in Turner's early work, which owes much to Regionalist Art and the American Scene. However, printmaking revealed the close attention to nature and fine detail of her mature style.

Her work is included in the collections of the Seattle Art Museum, the Smithsonian American Art Museum, the Portland Art Museum, the Dallas Museum of Art, the Pennsylvania Academy of Fine Arts, the Nelson-Atkins Museum of Art, and the Bywaters Special Collections at Southern Methodist University. In 1952, Turner won a Guggenheim Fellowship during which she perfected the combination linoleum block and serigraph technique for which she became well known.

Turner was an active member of the Dallas-based Printmakers Guild (renamed the Texas Printmakers in 1952). This all-female organization was created when the founding members were denied membership in the male-dominated Lone Star Printmakers. The women of the Guild worked to educate the public about printmaking, to sell their prints, and to create exhibitions of their work in libraries, museums, and colleges. Other notable members included Florence McClung, Verda Ligon, Mary Lightfoot, and Blanche McVeigh.

Turner was a professor of art at California State University, Chico, between 1959 and 1981, and died in Chico. The Janet Turner Print Museum at the university was created in her name. During her lifetime, Turner's work received relatively little scholarly attention, which critics have attributed to biases against printmaking, regional artists, and Turner's gender. Additionally, she worked in the more unpopular figurative style during the heyday of abstraction and Abstract Expressionism.

=== Collections ===
Her work is included in the collections of the Seattle Art Museum, the Smithsonian American Art Museum, the Portland Art Museum, the Dallas Museum of Art, the Pennsylvania Academy of Fine Arts, the Nelson-Atkins Museum of Art, and the Bywaters Special Collections at Southern Methodist University.

=== Works ===
Many of Turner's works explore the natural world in minute detail. She often created preliminary paintings and clay models before she created a print; these were sometimes sold as finished works.

Backbone of a Sheep III reveals her preoccupation with accurate detail and her mastery of the printing form. In her lithograph The Prey, two lizards stalk a butterfly. The composition fills the picture frame and draws the viewer's eye to the plethora of detail.
