= Coreen Mary Spellman =

20th-century American artist

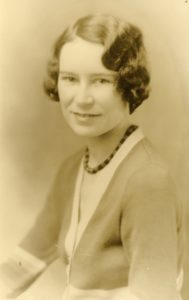
- Courtesy of Spellman Museum of Forney History
- Born: March 17, 1905; Forney, Texas, US
- Died: October 15, 1978 (aged 73); Denton, Texas, US
- Education: Texas Woman's University; Columbia University Teacher's College; University of Iowa
- Occupations: painter, printmaker, teacher

Coreen Mary Spellman (1905–1978) was an American printmaker, painter, and teacher active in Texas from the 1920s until her death in 1978.

== Personal life ==
Spellman was born March 17, 1905, in Forney, Texas to Carrie (Huffines) and Michael Spellman, an Irish banker and farmer. The second of six children, her parents were not artistic but supported Coreen's artistic development as best they could throughout her childhood and teenage years.

In the 1970s, she kept detailed sketchbooks and journals while traveling to Great Britain with Mary Loving, and again while traveling the Middle East with her sister, Mabel Maxey, and Thetis Lemmon. These journals and more of her personal papers are now held by Texas Woman's University. The Dallas Museum of Art houses the Coreen Mary Spellman Papers, which contains materials pertaining to her artwork, exhibitions, education, teaching, and personal life.

After a lengthy art career that included hundreds of works, 13 solo exhibitions, dozens of gallery showings and countless lectures, Coreen Mary Spellman died on October 15, 1978, in Denton, Texas at 73 years old. She is buried at Hillcrest Cemetery in Forney, Texas.

=== Education ===
Spellman expressed an early interest in art, receiving weekly art lessons from Vivian L. Aunspaugh as a child. She earned a Bachelor of Science degree in costume design from Texas State College for Women (now Texas Women's University) in 1925 before getting her first master's degree in art at Columbia University Teacher's College in 1926. She joined several art classes at Harvard University in 1927, then moved to New York City to attend the Art Students League from 1928 to 1929. She would continue her art studies throughout her life, regularly attending classes at the University of Colorado and eventually earning a Master of Fine Arts from the University of Iowa in 1942.

== Career ==
=== Teaching ===
Spellman taught at New Mexico Highlands University in Las Vegas, New Mexico, Sull Ross State Teachers College in Alpine, Texas, and Sam Houston State Teachers College in Huntsville, Texas. Her longest held position was as an associate professor of art at her undergraduate alma mater in Denton, where she began teaching in 1929 and would ultimately retire from in 1974.

=== Organizations ===
Coreen Spellman was an original founder of the Printmakers Guild, a group of women who aimed to share printmaking with the public and help female printmakers sell their work at annual exhibitions and traveling shows. The group was organized in 1940 after one of its founders, Bertha Landers, was denied entry to the all-male Lonestar Printmakers. The other founders included Lucile Land Lacy, Stella LaMond, Mary Lightfoot, Verda Ligon, Blanche McVeigh, and Lura Ann Taylor, and the group had an additional 23 active participants. In 1952 it was renamed Texas Printmakers, and the group invited its first male artists in 1961 before disbanding several years later in 1965.

Spellman was an active member of many groups in her lifetime, including Southern States Art League, Denton Art League, Delta Phi Delta, Delta Kappa Gamma, Associated Art Instructors of Texas, and National Women's Teacher Association.

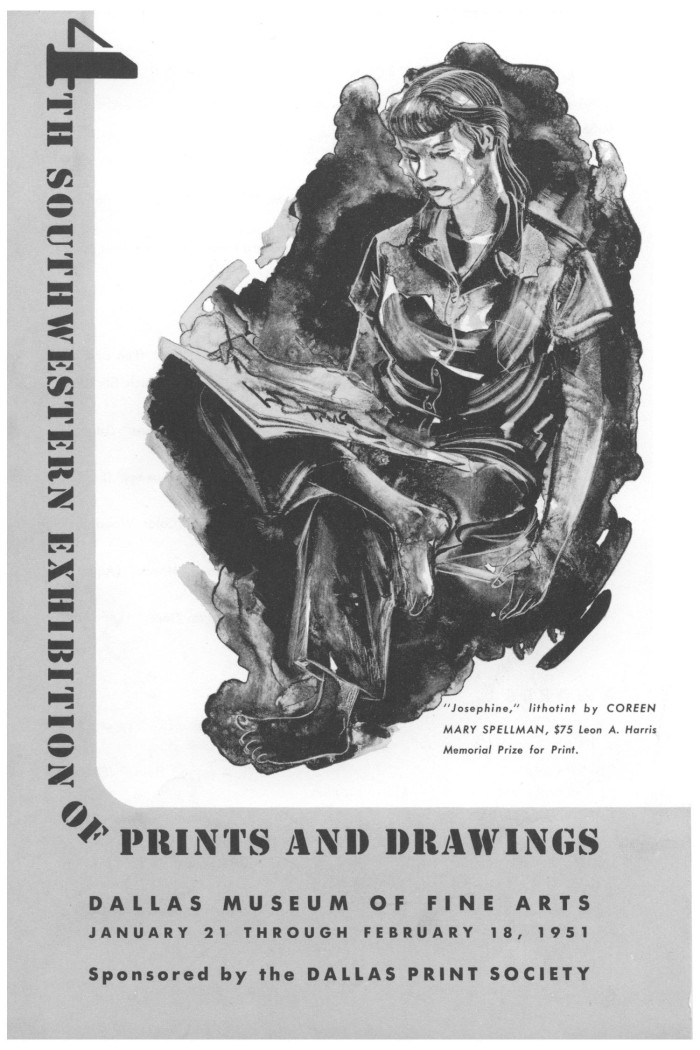
Josephine, lithograph, Spellman, 1951

=== Exhibitions ===
Coreen Spellman held a known 13 exhibitions in her lifetime throughout the American southwest and beyond. The first solo exhibition of her drawings was mounted by Dallas Museum of Art in December 1932. She held subsequent exhibitions at Witte Museum in San Antonio, Texas, and Museum of Fine Arts, Houston in 1933. Sixteen years later in 1949, Santa Fe Art Museum and New Mexico Highlands University held Spellman exhibitions followed quickly by the Elisabet Ney Museum in January 1950.

In August 1990, the Meadows Museum at Southern Methodist University mounted an exhibit titled "The Texas Printmakers: 1940-1965" that included several works by Spellman. The Center for Visual Arts in Denton included several examples of her work in an exhibit titled "Pioneers in Modernism" in 2010, and Tyler Museum of Art launched a solo exhibit dedicated to her work called "Coreen Spellman: Works on Paper" in 2021.

In October 2022, Spellman was featured in an exhibit mounted by the Greater Denton Arts Council on the Forgotten Nine, a group of women artists working at the same time as the Dallas Nine but less celebrated due to their gender.

=== Awards ===
In 1932, the Society of Graphic Arts selected one of Spellman's lithographs, Nude (1929), as one of the fifty best prints of the year. Four years later, the American Artists Congress selected one of her mezzotint prints for inclusion in an exhibit of contemporary American prints that was held in thirty states at once. In 1949, a Spellman print was included in the book American Prize Prints of the 20th Century by Albert Reese.

== Works ==
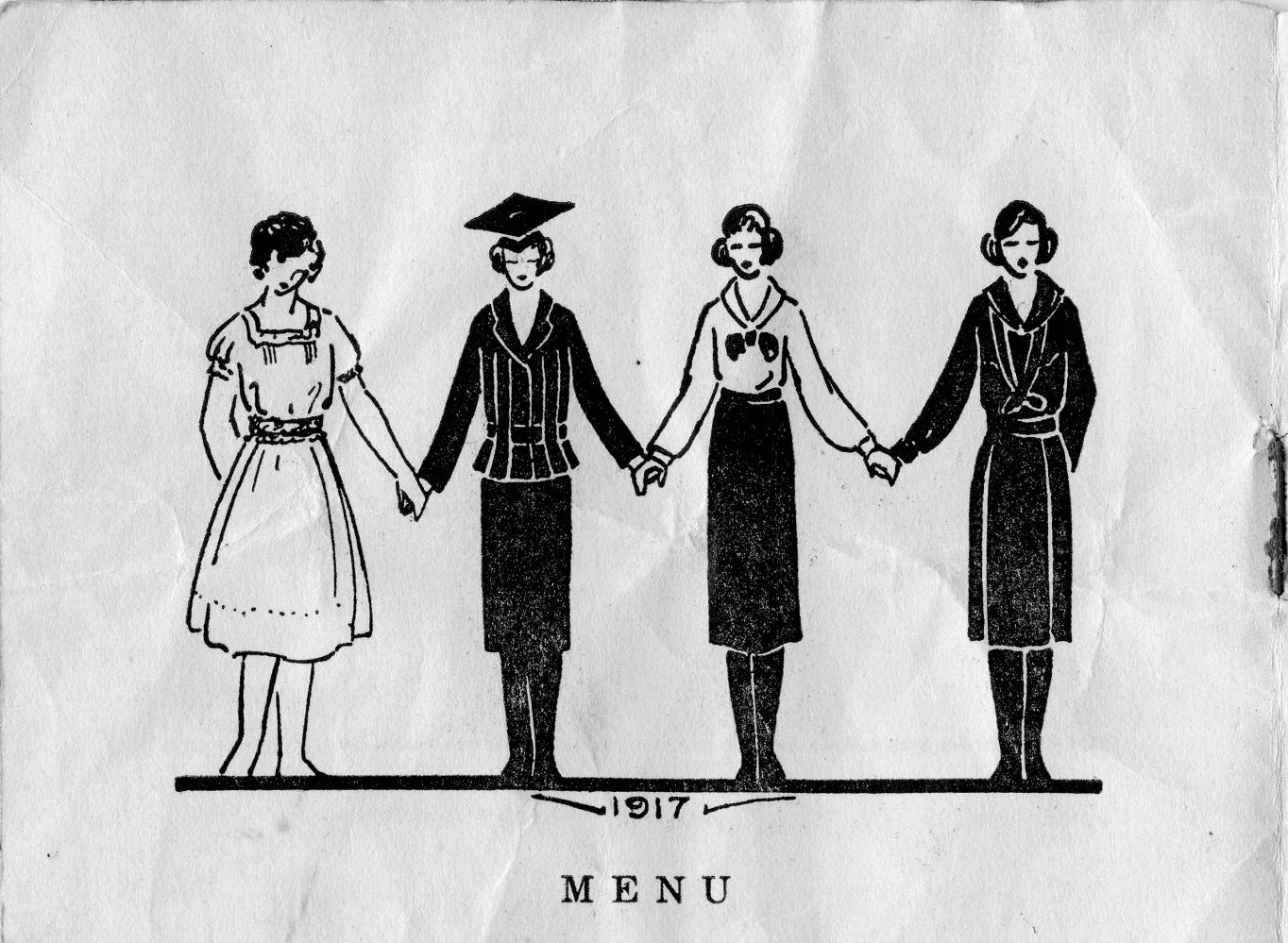
Menu illustration by Spellman for an annual reunion banquet, 1927

Coreen Spellman's artistic work was heavily influenced by industrial landscapes, human-made structures, and her Texas surroundings. She was skilled at watercolor, oils, etching, aquatint, and mezzotint, but she had a particular love for lithography. She was also known to illustrate books, pamphlets, and programs for local organizations, parties, and galleries.

=== Prints ===
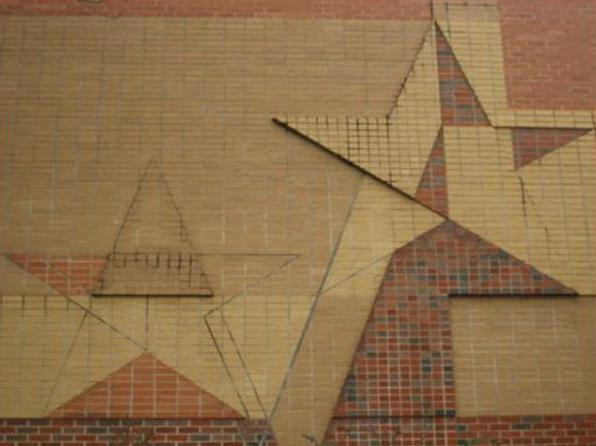
Spellman mural (1956) on the Arts and Sciences building of Texas Woman's University

=== 1956 mural ===
In 1956, Texas Women's University selected Spellman to design one of two murals for the new Arts and Sciences building, later called the Patio Building, on campus. Her design featured several different kinds of bricks integrated into the surface of the wall, resulting in blocks of color that protrude or recede from the wall. Many point out the similarities between this mural and many of Spellman's other works, and some have suggested the star motifs are an intentional nod to her love of Texas. In the summer of 2025, the building was demolished and Spellman's mural was carefully disassembled and preserved for future use.

=== Collections ===
The largest collection of Coreen Mary Spellman works, more than 120 pieces, is housed in the permanent collection of the Dallas Museum of Art. The most prominent items of the collection include the 1936 oil painting Road Signs and the 1942 etching Orizaba Market which can typically be found on display within the museum.

In addition to countless private collections, her work is included in the collections of Whitney Museum of American Art, Brooklyn Museum, National Gallery of Art, Southern Methodist University, Texas Women's University, Tyler Museum of Art, Amon Carter Museum of American Art, and Spellman Museum of Forney History.
