= Lura Ann Taylor =

Lura Ann Taylor (sometimes Lura Ann Hedrick Taylor or Lura Ann Taylor Hedrick) (1906–1990) was an American printmaker.

A native of Smithville, Missouri, Taylor studied at Southern Methodist University and Texas Woman's University. A member of various art organizations in Dallas, in 1939 she was one of eight women who founded the Printmakers Guild, later called Texas Printmakers, to challenge the male-dominated Lone Star Printmakers; the others were Lucile Land Lacy, Bertha Landers, Stella LaMond, Mary Lightfoot, Verda Ligon, Blanche McVeigh, and Coreen Mary Spellman. She exhibited widely in Texas, and died in Dallas. Taylor's wood engraving Three Old Hens of c. 1947 is owned by the National Gallery of Art, where they are part of the donation made to the museum by Reba and Dave Williams of the Print Research Foundation in 2009. Taylor was the co-author of The Development of Pottery, published by Texas State University for Women in 1937, and illustrated a handful of histories of Texas written by Bertha Mae Cox and published in the 1940s.
