= Bertha Landers =

American painter

Bertha Mae Landers (1911–1996) was an American painter and printmaker.

A native of Winnsboro, Texas, where she was raised, Landers graduated from Sul Ross State Teachers College in 1931 with a bachelor's degree in art. She studied at the Colorado Springs Fine Arts Center and at the Art Students League of New York, at the latter working under the tutelage of Reginald Marsh. Further lessons occurred under Olin Travis at the Dallas Art Institute and with Henry Varnum Poor and Arnold Blanch. Long employed by the Dallas Public Library, she founded its audiovisual department in 1942. She began to be active in California in the 1930s, while still living in Dallas, and later settled in the state. In Escondido, in 1956, she founded Landers Film and Video Reviews; she died in San Diego.

Landers belonged to a number of artistic organizations during her career, including the Southern States Art League, Southern Printmakers, and the Texas Fine Arts Association; she was a charter member of the National Museum of Women in the Arts. In 1939 she was one of eight women who founded the Printmakers Guild, later called Texas Printmakers, to challenge the male-dominated Lone Star Printmakers; the others were Lucile Land Lacy, Stella Lamond, Mary Lightfoot, Verda Ligon, Blanche McVeigh, Coreen Mary Spellman, and Lura Ann Taylor. During her career, she exhibited widely in Texas and California, showing work at venues elsewhere in the United States as well. In 1940 she held a one-woman show at the Dallas Museum of Art. That institution owns a gouache by her, Forgotten, as well as an etching and aquatint, Market Day, and nine lithographs. Four more prints, the 1946 screenprint Ad Infinitum and three lithographs are owned by the National Gallery of Art; they are part of the donation made to the museum by Reba and Dave Williams of the Print Research Foundation in 2009. The 1914 lithograph Mexican Funeral is held by the Library of Congress. Works by Landers may also be found in the collections of the San Antonio Museum of Art, Southern Methodist University, and the University of Texas.
