= Raviv =

Raviv is a Hebrew name. Notable people with the name include:

- Raviv Drucker, Israeli journalist, political commentator and investigative reporter
- Raviv Limonad (born 1984), Israeli basketball player
- Raviv Pitshon (born 1989), Israeli basketball player
- Raviv Ullman, Israeli-American actor
- Raviv Zoller, Israeli business executive
- Raviv Weidenfeld (born 1970), Israeli tennis player
- Avishai Raviv, Israeli member of SBK
- Dan Raviv, American journalist
- Ilana Raviv, Israeli artist
