= Lucile Land Lacy =

American artist and occupational therapist

Alma Lucile Land Lacy (August 18, 1901 – October 29, 1994) was an American painter, printmaker, teacher and occupational therapist. She was active in the artistic community in Texas. Lacy was awarded Honorary Life Membership of the Texas Occupational Therapy Association for her service to the profession.

== Early life and education ==
Alma Lucile Land was the first child of Charles Richard Land (1876-1961) and Annie Irish Land (1880-1925). Her parents married on 29 July 1900. Her father was a farm labourer. Lucile was born on 18 August 1901 in Temple, Bell County, Texas. Her only sibling, Katie Lee Land (1902-1986) was born a year later.

Little is known about Lacy's early life. She and her sister attended Baylor Female College, now the University of Mary Hardin-Baylor (UMHB). Both became teachers. In March 1932, she married Floyd Hubbard Lacy (1903-1965), a clerk with a utility company.

Lacy was a pupil of Ellen Douglas Stuart and Ella Koepke Mewhinney. She graduated with a Bachelor of Arts degree from the College. Lacy then attended the New York School of Interior Decoration before receiving a Master of Arts degree from Columbia University in 1940.

== Career ==
She began her teaching career as an assistant in her alma mater's Art Department in 1933: from 1924 until 1931 she was an instructor, and from 1932 until 1944 she was head of the Art Department.

=== Artist ===
Lacy was a member of numerous artistic organizations including the Southern States Art League and the Texas Fine Arts Association. In 1939 she was one of eight women who founded the Printmakers Guild, later called Texas Printmakers, to challenge the male-dominated Lone Star Printmakers; the others were Bertha Landers, Stella LaMond, Mary Lightfoot, Verda Ligon, Blanche McVeigh, Coreen May Spellman, and Lura Ann Taylor. From 1942 until 1944 she was president of the Texas Art Education Association. She exhibited her work widely, both in Texas and elsewhere in the United States, and in 1943 was the subject of a one-woman show of prints at the Dallas Museum of Art.

=== Occupational therapy ===
Upon retirement from the College, Lacy changed career. She studied at the Philadelphia School of Occupational Therapy when Helen Willard was Director of the School. Lacy was licenced in 1945, becoming an Occupational Therapist Registered (OTR). In that year she began work at the Old Farms Convalescent Hospital in Avon, Connecticut, continuing for two years. In 1947 Lacy took a position as chief occupational therapist at the Veterans Administration hospital in Temple, and two years later she moved to Houston to occupy the same role, remaining there until 1953.

Lacy was active in state and national associations for her profession. She was awarded Honorary Life Membership of the Texas Occupational Therapy Association. The UMHB Alumni Association described Lacy as a gifted artist who blended creativity with care and used art to help other heal.

== Death and legacy ==
Lucile Land Lacy died on 29 October 1994, aged 93. She was buried at Hillcrest Cemetery, Temple near her husband, parents and sister. Her grave is marked by simple headstone.

A scholarship in Lacy's honour at the University of Mary Hardin-Baylor, was established by former pupil Marjorie Hamilton Gillies. In 1985, her friend Vivian Bain Killgore, UMHB Class of 1925, donated her collection of Lacy's Christmas cards to the UMHB Museum.

Three of Lacy's prints, the linocut First Monday of c. 1935–1940 and the lithographs Left Side of Tracks, of 1940, and the undated Summer Blankness, are in the collection of the National Gallery of Art; they are part of the donation made to the museum by Reba White Williams and Dave Williams of the Print Research Foundation in 2009. In 2018, the Bell County Museum acquired Texas Hallmarks, a lithograph by Lacy.
