= Blanche McVeigh =

American printmaker (1895–1970)

- Born: August 23, 1895; St. Charles, Missouri
- Died: June 1, 1970 (aged 74); Fort Worth, Texas
- Known for: Printmaking
- Movement: Fort Worth Circle

Blanche McVeigh (August 23, 1895 – June 1, 1970) was an American printmaker, founder of the Fort Worth School of Fine Arts and Fort Worth Artists Guild, and art educator in Fort Worth, Texas. Known for her mastery of the aquatint medium, McVeigh's leadership in art education influenced a generation of local artists, particularly members of the group known as the Fort Worth Circle. Her work is represented in several national collections as well as local and private collections.

== Early life ==
Blanche McVeigh was born August 23, 1895, in St. Charles, Missouri, to Blanche Fielding and William M. McVeigh, a flour mill salesman from Virginia; the family moved to Fort Worth when McVeigh was a child. She was the second of four children. McVeigh attended Fort Worth public schools and, after graduating high school, was hired as a teacher at the Walter A. Huffman School in downtown Fort Worth. She was an active participant in Fort Worth society, hosting parties, performing with the Clio Club and volunteering with the Red Cross during World War I.

== Education ==
Finding that she did not particularly enjoy teaching, McVeigh left Texas to study commercial art at the St. Louis School of Fine Arts at Washington University in St. Louis in 1919–1920. Returning to Fort Worth, McVeigh spent the 1920s running an advertising agency and doing commercial art. She attended the Pennsylvania Academy of the Fine Arts during one summer and the Art Institute of Chicago during another; she also attended the Art Students League of New York. McVeigh spent 1927 in Europe learning aquatint, which would become her preferred printmaking medium, and studied with Oklahoma artist Doel Reed.

== Career ==
McVeigh was renowned for her etchings, and particularly for her mastery of the challenging medium of aquatint. Her genre images of African Americans and so-called "Negro Angels," inspired by her love of gospel music and spirituals, were especially popular with collectors.

In 1932, McVeigh founded the Fort Worth School of Fine Arts with fellow local sculptor and fellow Washington University alumna Evaline Sellors; McVeigh taught figure drawing and etching there. McVeigh and Sellors were soon joined by Fort Worth artist Wade Jolley. The school was located in the Little Theater building behind the Fort Worth Woman's Club. Although it closed in 1941 with the advent of World War II, the Fort Worth School of Fine Arts was influential because it counted members of the future Fort Worth Circle group of artists among its students, most notably Bror Utter and Veronica Helfensteller.

From approximately 1940 to 1949, McVeigh worked in a local frame shop; she owned her own frame shop on Throckmorton Street in downtown Fort Worth from 1951 until 1962. She also operated a home studio that housed her massive Sturges printing press, which is now owned by the Modern Art Museum of Fort Worth, where it is still used in printmaking workshops. The press was so large and heavy that the floor needed to be shored up to support it. She was given the Sturges press in 1942 so she could complete a large print commissioned by the Northern Pump Company, Minneapolis.

McVeigh produced little art in the last few years of her life due to poor health.

=== Collections ===
Works by McVeigh are included in the permanent collections of the Library of Congress, Smithsonian Institution, Dallas Museum of Art, Carnegie Institute, Princeton University, Pennsylvania Academy of the Fine Arts, Old Jail Art Center, and Amon Carter Museum of American Art.

=== Organizations ===
McVeigh and Sellors were also founding members of the Fort Worth Artists Guild, the first Fort Worth organization to exhibit the work of local artists, in 1934. By 1937, McVeigh was also the chair of the Fort Worth Woman's Club art department.

In 1939 McVeigh was one of eight women who founded the Printmakers Guild, later called Texas Printmakers, in response to being excluded from the male-dominated Lone Star Printmakers; the others were Lucile Land Lacy, Bertha Landers, Stella LaMond, Mary Lightfoot, Verda Ligon, Coreen Mary Spellman, and Lura Ann Taylor. ^{(link to page)}

McVeigh was a member of the Society of American Graphic Artists, Dallas Print Club, Fort Worth Art Association, Prairie Printmakers, California Society of Etchers, Printmakers Guild of Texas, and the Southern States Art League.

=== Exhibitions ===
McVeigh's work was exhibited at the 1937 Greater Texas & Pan-American Exposition in Dallas and the 1939 New York World's Fair. In 1940, McVeigh and former student Veronica Helfensteller exhibited prints in the Washington Color Show at the Corcoran Gallery of Art; McVeigh's work was also included in the 14th annual exhibition of the National Academy of Design, which was also shown at the Venice Biennale's American pavilion. In 1944, McVeigh had prints in concurrent exhibitions at the Library of Congress, Philadelphia Color Print Club, Philadelphia Print Club, and Connecticut Museum of Fine Arts. She also hosted a meeting of the Printmakers Guild of Texas at her home on Hurley Street. In the 1950s, she exhibited prints at the Brooklyn Print Show along with former student, Bror Utter, and the Society of American Graphic Artists included her prints in a collection presented to the Metropolitan Museum of Art as a memorial to American printmaker John Taylor Arms. In 1952, she had her first retrospective exhibition at the Fort Worth Art Association. In 1962, McVeigh experimented with monotype printmaking, and exhibited the resulting works at Fort Worth's Electra Carlin Gallery.

== Death ==
McVeigh died on June 1, 1970, at age 74. Funeral services were held at All Saints Episcopal Church; McVeigh, who did not marry, was buried alongside her parents at Greenwood Cemetery in Fort Worth. Later that year, a memorial exhibition including most of McVeigh's prints was held in the artist's honor at Electra Carlin Gallery.
