= Arnold Blanch =

American painter (1896–1968)

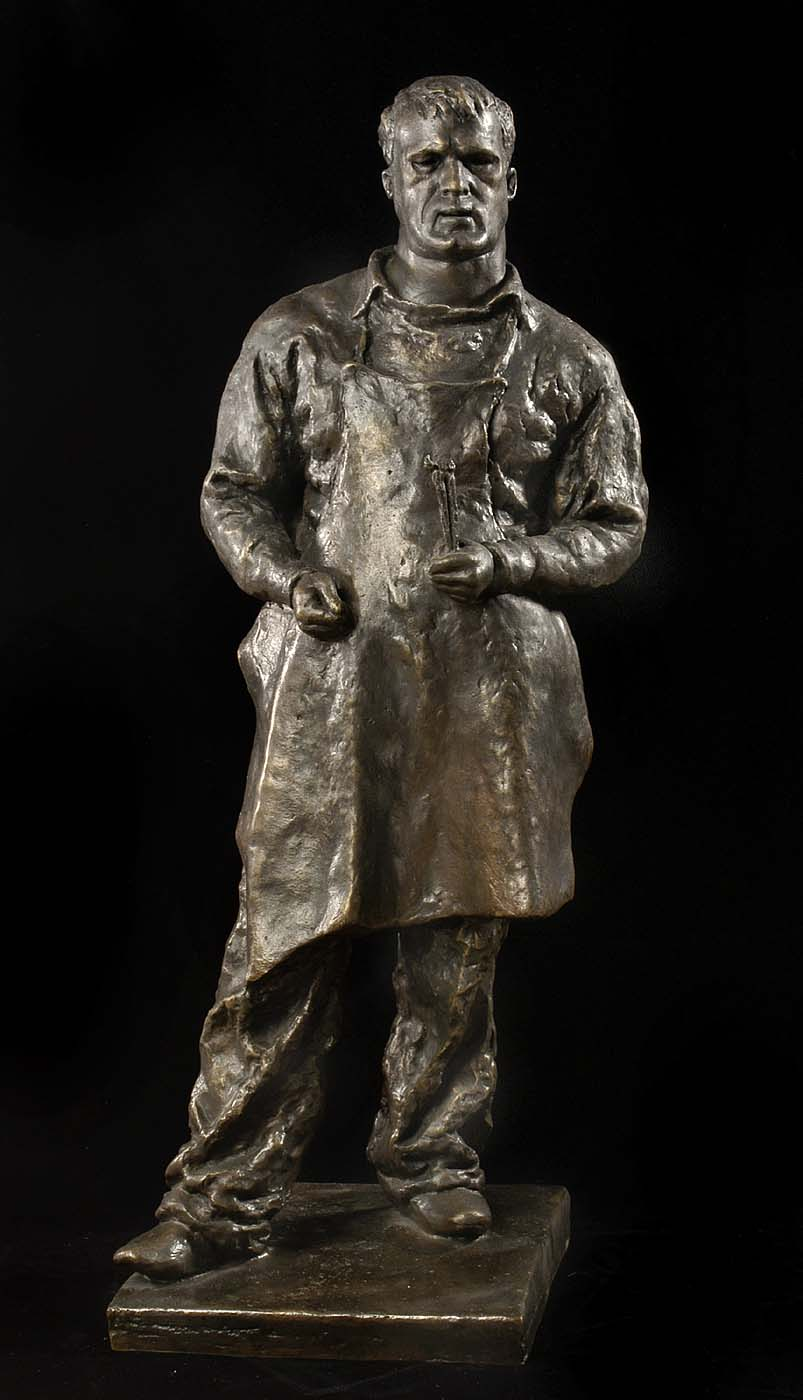
- Arnold Blanch (1934), bronze sculpture by Eugenie Gershoy
- Born: June 4, 1896; Mantorville, Minnesota, US
- Died: October 3, 1968 (aged 72)
- Known for: Painter
- Movement: Social Realism

Arnold Blanch (June 4, 1896 – October 3, 1968), was born and raised in Mantorville, Minnesota. He was an American modernist painter, etcher, illustrator, lithographer, muralist, printmaker and art teacher.

== Life ==
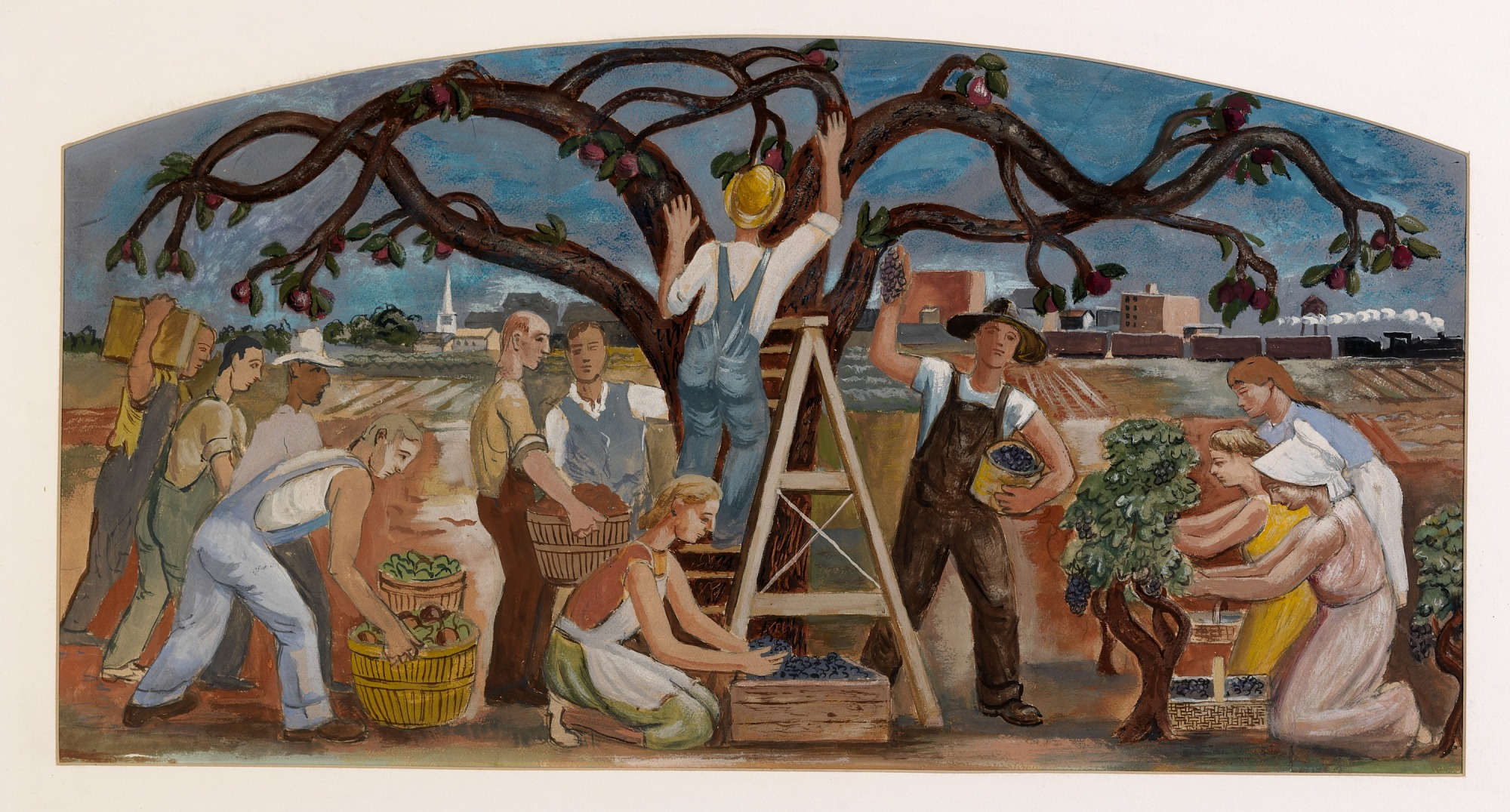
Study for The Harvest (1937), Blanch's mural for the United States Post Office in Fredonia, New York

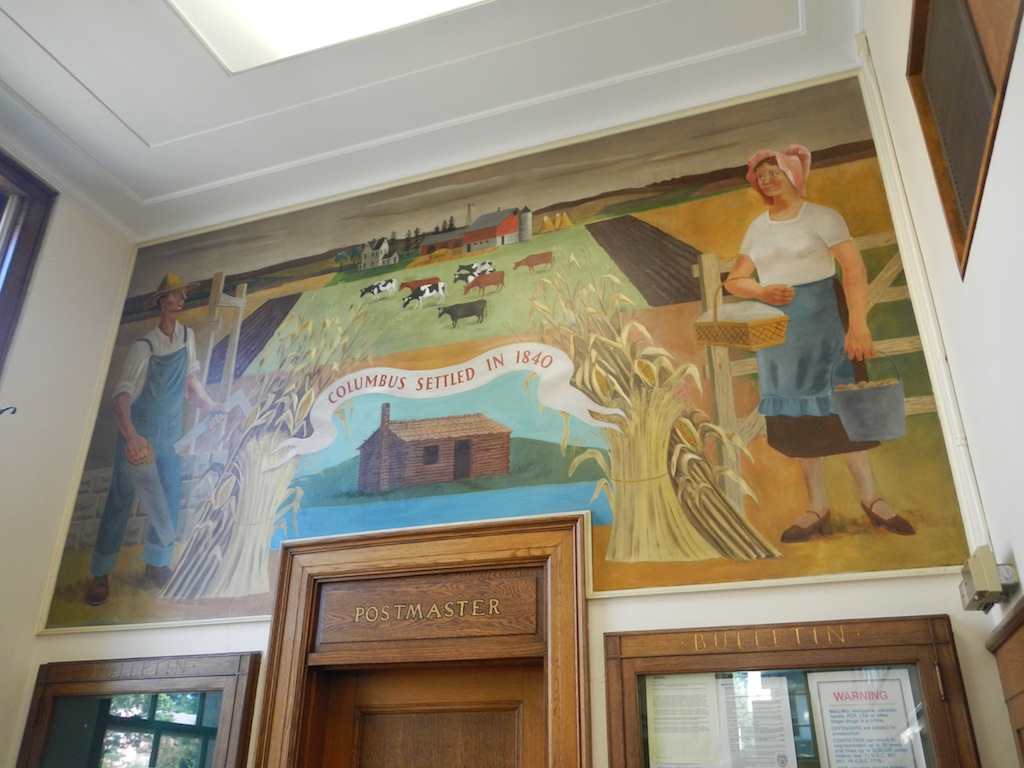
Mural at the post office in Columbus, Wisconsin (1940)

His modernist paintings are associated with the Social Realist movement. Blanch met his first wife the painter Lucile Blanch, (born Lucile Lundquist), at the Minneapolis School of Art.

After the end of World War I, Lucile and Arnold Blanch moved to New York City and enrolled at the Art Students League of New York, studying with John Sloan, Robert Henri, Kenneth Hayes Miller and Boardman Robinson. Eventually by 1923 they settled in Woodstock, New York, which was then beginning to become an important art colony for young artists. By the 1920s Blanch began to achieve recognition for his paintings and lithographs of landscapes and still lifes. During the 1930s in New York, Blanch worked for the Section of Painting and Sculpture on various mural projects, including The Harvest at the United States Post Office in Fredonia, New York.

In 1939, Blanch remarried and for many years he lived in Woodstock, New York with his second wife Doris Lee, also an artist. Blanch taught at the Art Students League's branch in Woodstock for several decades from the 1930s until his death in the late 1960s. His paintings are in the permanent collections of the Metropolitan Museum of Art; the Museum of Modern Art in New York City; the Cleveland Museum of Art; the Whitney Museum of American Art; the Smith College Museum of Art; the Sheldon Museum of Art; the Woodstock Artists Association and Museum (WAAM); one of the oldest American artists' organizations, and dozens of others.

Among Blanch's pupils were painters and printmakers including Bruce Dorfman, Bertha Landers, and Ronnie Landfield, and Frances Rhea Basch, among others.

== Solo exhibitions ==
- Dudensing Galleries, New York City, 1928
- Dudensing Galleries, New York City, 1930
- Walden-Dudensing Gallery, Chicago, 1930
- Ulrich Gallery, Minneapolis, 1930
- Beaux Arts Gallery, San Francisco, 1930
- Rehn Galleries, New York City, 1932
- Rehn Galleries, New York City, 1935
- Associated American Artists, New York City, 1940
- Associated American Artists, New York City, 1945
- Krasner Gallery, New York City, 1960's
- Rudolph Galleries, Woodstock, NY and Coral Gables, Fla., 1950s & 1960s

== Awards and honors ==
- Scholarship, Art Students League, New York City, 1916
- Norman Waite Harris Silver Medal, Art Institute of Chicago, Chicago, Illinois, 1929
- Anne Bremer First Prize, Art Association Purchase Prize, San Francisco Art Association, San Francisco, California, 1931
- Fellowship, John Simon Guggenheim Memorial Foundation, 1933
- Beck Gold Medal, Pennsylvania Academy of the Fine Arts, Philadelphia, Pennsylvania, 1938
- Third Prize, Annual Carnegie International Exhibition of Paintings, Carnegie Institute, Pittsburgh, Pennsylvania
- Prize, Domesday Press Competition in Juvenile Book Illustration, New York City, 1945
- First Prize and two Honorable Mentions for designs, National Ceramic Exhibition, Syracuse Museum of Fine Arts, Syracuse, New York, 1949
- First Prize at the National Ceramic Exhibition, 1949 and 1951
- Purchase Prize, Art USA, New York, 1959
- Purchase Prize, Mary Washington College of the University of Virginia, 1959
- Best Painting in Show, Albany Art Institute, 1960
- Prize, Landscape Painting, Silvermine Guild of Artists, 1961
- Ford Grant, 1964
