= Ilana Raviv =

Israeli artist

- אילנה רביב
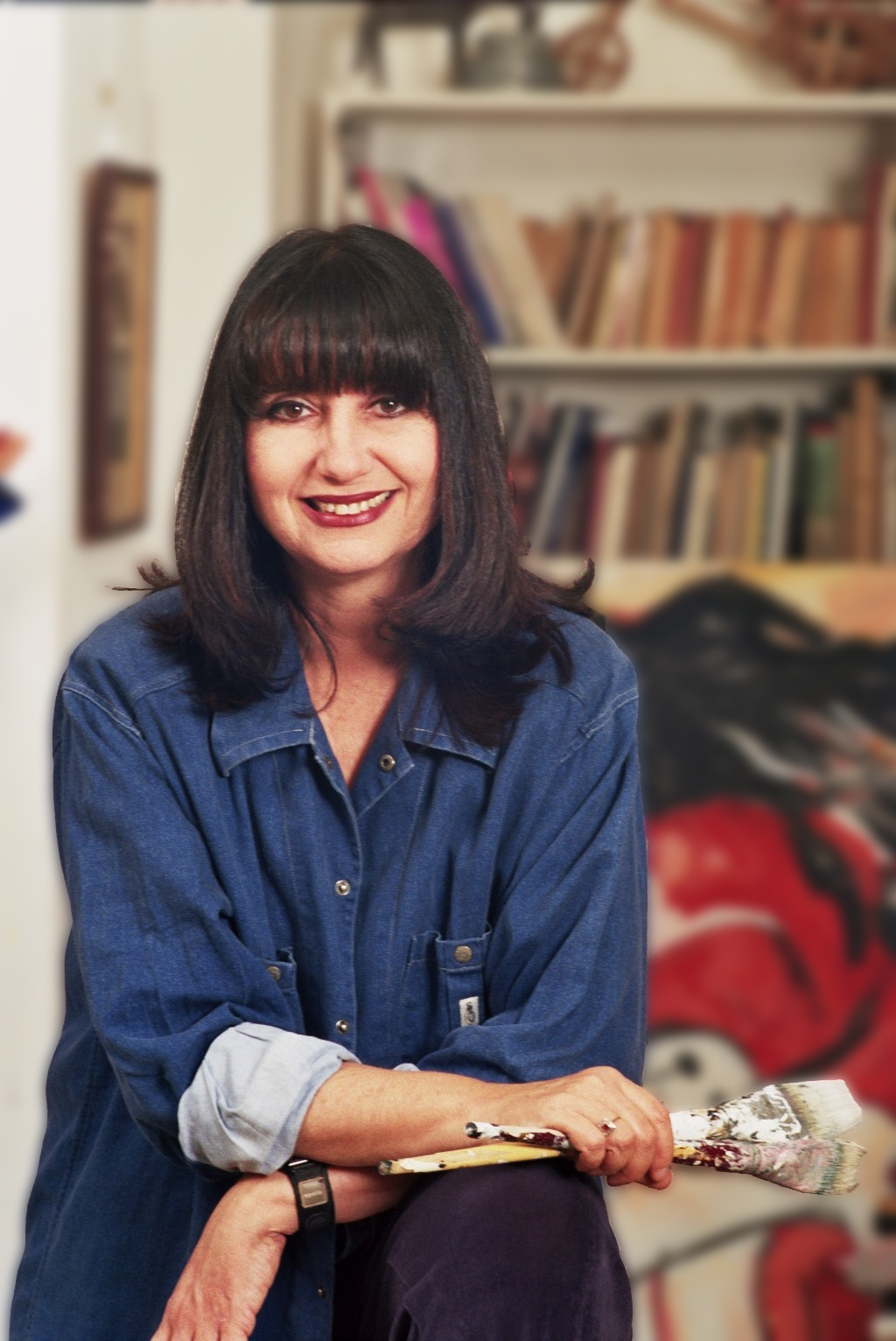
- Born: November 29, 1945 (age 80); Tel Aviv

Ilana Raviv-Oppenheim (Hebrew: אילנה רביב-אופנהיים; born 1945) is a multidisciplinary artist. Her work spans a variety of media including painting, drawing, etching, tapestry, and ceramic sculpture.

== Biography ==
She was born in Tel Aviv in 1945 to Itzhak and Fanya Oppenheim. The painter Moritz Daniel Oppenheim was her great-great-granduncle. Ilana grew up in Israel.

From 1980 to 1990, she lived with her family in the art capital of the world, New York, in order to study, renew herself, and broaden her artistic vision. During her stay, from 1980 to 1984 she studied at the Art Students League of New York. Among her teachers were Roberto Delamonica, Bruce Dorfman, and the American master Knox Martin.

Ilana Raviv has exhibited in various museums and galleries of Israel, the US, Europe, and the Far East. Recently Ilana has exhibited her works alongside known artists, including Knox Martin, Rauschenberg, Larry Rivers, Rosenquist, Chuck Close, Marisol

== Work ==
=== Influences ===
The great mother figure from Greek mythology is among the chief topics in her work, as are other characters from the Bible, from history, and from literature. Her works are built from a variety of flat designs, contrasts, and shapes, which create different versions and dimensions of reality.

Raviv describes her works as "a metaphor which creates and shapes an artificial life on canvas".

In 2008 she received the title of Tel Aviv–Jaffa "Woman of the Year", representing the arts.

Her work is represented in private collections and in various museums and galleries around the world. A solo exhibition consisting of 50 pictures by Ilana was presented at the State Russian Museum in Saint Petersburg between October 2007 and January 2008, and another solo exhibition of 100 pictures was presented at the Moscow Museum of Modern Art. In both museums, she was the first native Israeli to exhibit.

The world of Ilana Raviv, an Israeli artist from the American school of painting, is presented to the Russian viewer for the first time. As we identify and describe her world in Russian, we may well compare it with the dramatic and expressive works of the so-called avant-garde Amazons, the apocalyptic figures of Natalia Goncharova, the card cycle of Olga Rozanova ...

— Lubov Shakirova, curator at the State Russian Museum, Saint Petersburg

Here in these halls, we see pictures by Ilana Raviv that recall the work of the greatest 20th-century artists. Not only Matisse and Picasso but also Albert Marquet or Raoul Dufy, the wonderdul French Fauvist painters. Similar simplicity, terseness, and wealth of energy in every spot also characterize Ilana Raviv’s excellent work. From that perspective, in my opinion, Ilana is a true successor to the outstanding artists of the 20th century.

— Dr. Andrei Tolstoy, head of the research department at the Museum of Modern Art, Moscow, and corresponding member of the Russian Academy of Arts

Besides the Russian museum exhibits, there is a Holocaust-themed painting that has figured for many years in the permanent collection of the Holocaust Memorial Museum in Washington DC. In this painting Ilana exposes the monstrous aspect of the topic more than she trains a direct view on its consequences. The painting shows the Ten Commandments consumed by flame, with an emphasis on "Thou shalt not murder." The struggle to survive is expressed only in the mixture of colors.

Her painting A Tabernacle of Peace – Homage to Zachariah (acrylic on canvas, 2.12 meters by 10) opened Israel's 40th anniversary celebrations in New York at the world's largest sukkah. Later it was displayed for eight years in the main entrance hall of the Jerusalem International Convention Center.

== Private life ==
Raviv is married and the mother of three. In the course of her life she has displayed her creations at many exhibits, including a pro bono exhibit to benefit Seeds Of Peace, which aims to connect Arab and Jewish youth.
