= Eugenie Gershoy =

American sculptor and painter (1901–1986)

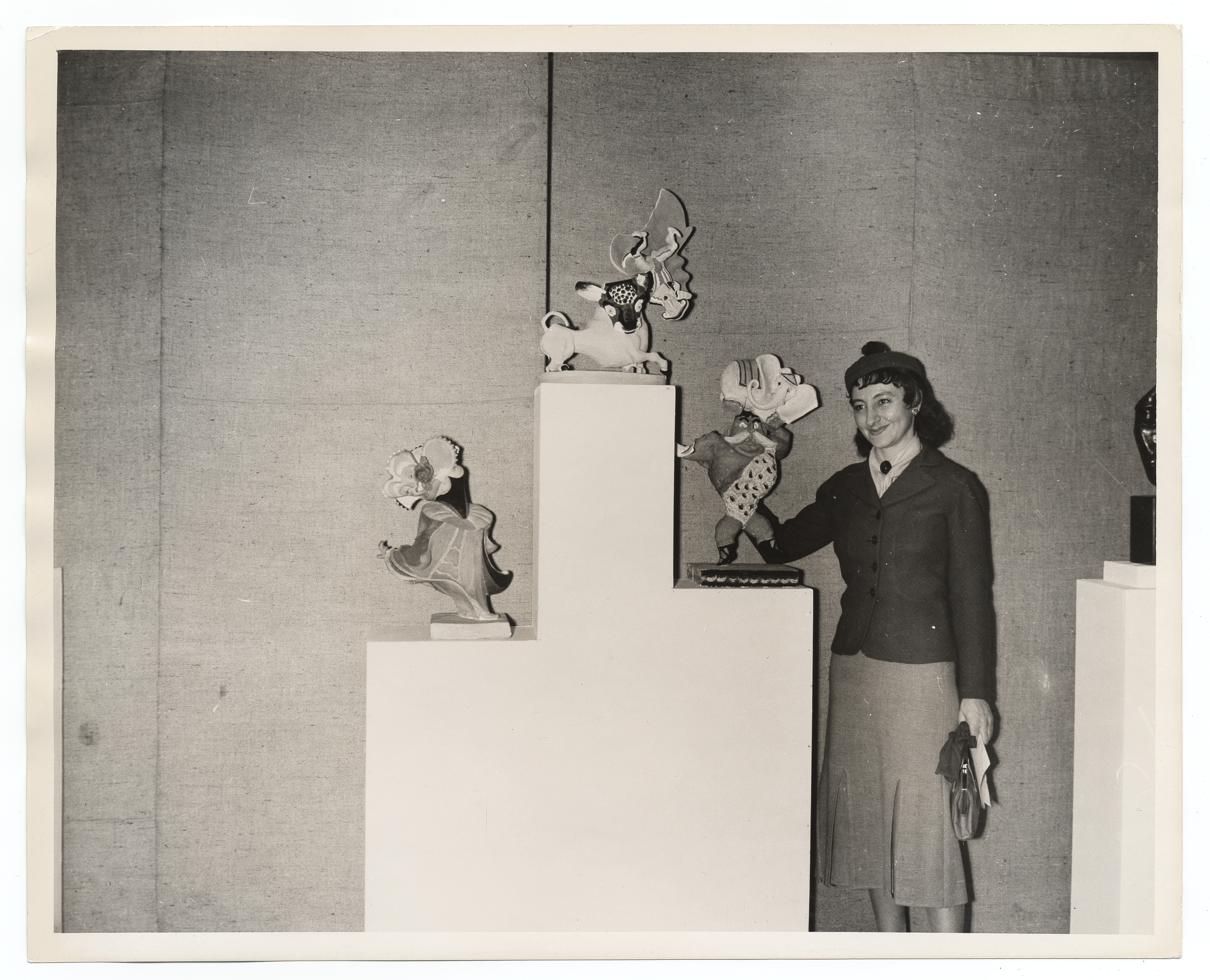
- Eugenie Gershoy, from the Archives of American Art
- Born: January 1, 1901; Krivoi Rog, Russian Empire
- Died: May 8, 1986 (aged 85)
- Education: Art Students League of New York
- Known for: Sculpture, watercolor, painting
- Awards: Saint-Gaudens Medal

Eugenie Gershoy (January 1, 1901 – May 8, 1986) was an American sculptor and watercolorist.

== Life ==
Gershoy emigrated to New York City with her family in 1903. Aided by scholarships, she studied at the Art Students League under Alexander Stirling Calder, Leo Lentelli, Kenneth Hayes Miller, and Boardman Robinson. Around this time, she created a group of portrait figurines of her fellow artists, including Arnold Blanch, Lucile Blanch, Raphael Soyer, William Zorach, Concetta Scaravaglione, and Emil Ganso, which were exhibited as a group at the Whitney Museum of American Art. At age 17, she was awarded the Saint-Gaudens Medal for fine draughtsmanship.

Gershoy married the Romanian-born artist Harry Gottlieb. In the late 1920s and early 1930s, the pair kept a studio in Woodstock, New York. There, Gershoy was influenced by sculptor John Flanagan, who lived and worked nearby.

From 1936 to 1939, Gershoy worked for the WPA Federal Art Project. She collaborated with Max Spivak on murals for the children's recreation room of the Queens Borough Public Library in Astoria, New York. She developed a mixture of wheat paste, plaster, and egg tempera, which she used in polychrome papier-mâché sculptures; she was the only New York sculptor to work in polychrome at this time. She also designed cement and mosaic sculptures of animals and figures to be placed in New York City playgrounds. Alongside others employed by the FAP, she participated in a sit-down strike in Washington, DC, to advocate for better pay and improved working conditions for the projects' artists.

Gershoy's first solo exhibition was held at the Robinson Gallery in New York in 1940. She moved to San Francisco in 1942, and began teaching ceramics at the California School of Fine Arts in 1946. In 1950, she studied at the artists' colony at Yaddo.

Gershoy traveled extensively throughout her life. She visited England and France in the early 1930s, and worked in Paris in 1951. She traveled to Mexico and Guatemala in the late 1940s, and also toured Africa, India, and the Orient in 1955.

In 1977, Gershoy dedicated a sculpture to Audrey McMahon, who was actively involved in the creation of the Federal Art Project and served as its regional director in New York, in recognition of the work McMahon provided struggling artists in the 1930s.

Gershoy lived for many years in the Chelsea Hotel in New York City, where a group of her papier-mache sculptures was on permanent display in the main lobby.

Gershoy's work is in the collections of the Whitney Museum of American Art, the Metropolitan Museum of Art, and the Smithsonian American Art Museum. Her papers are held at Syracuse University.

== Gallery ==
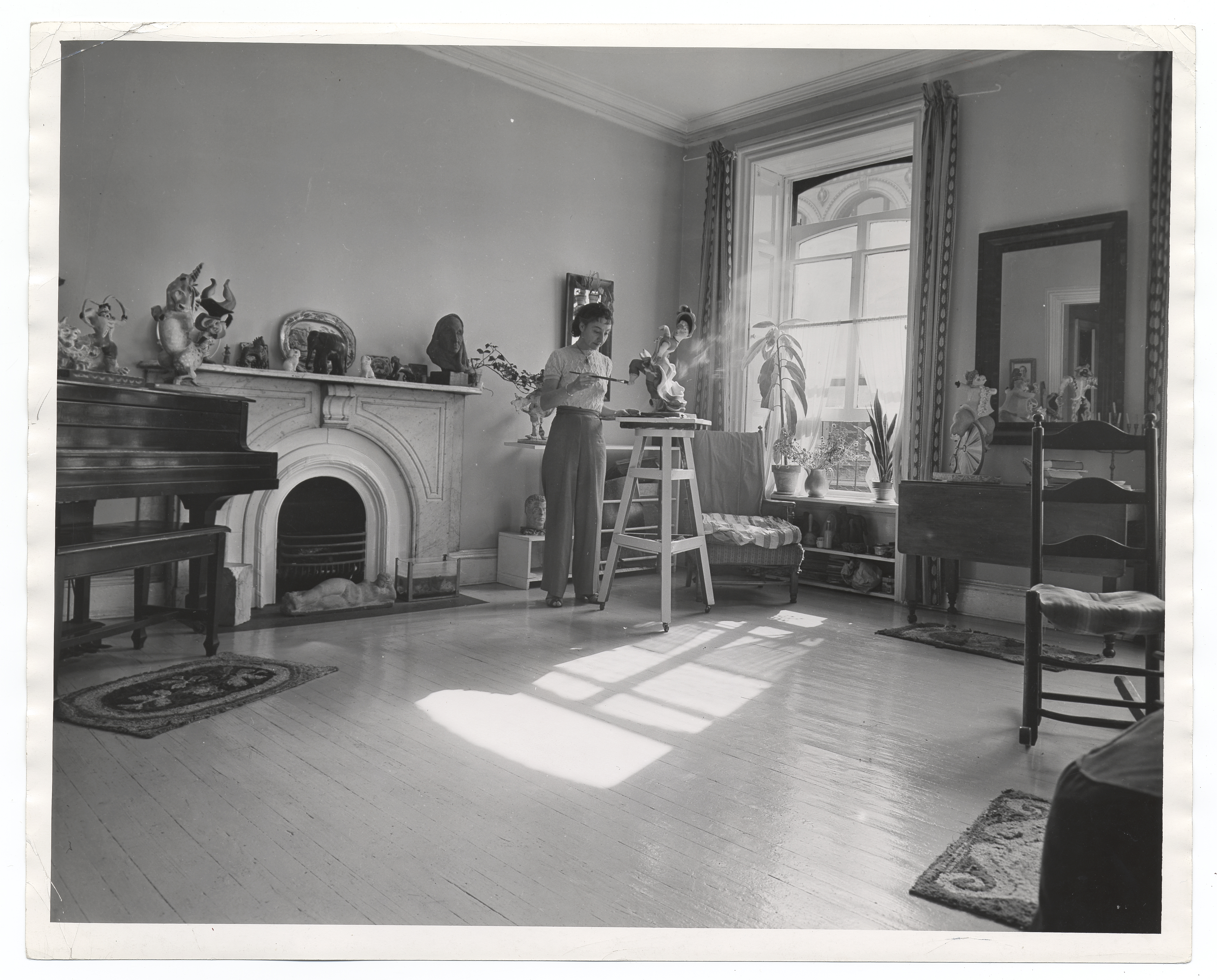
Eugenie Gershoy in her studio

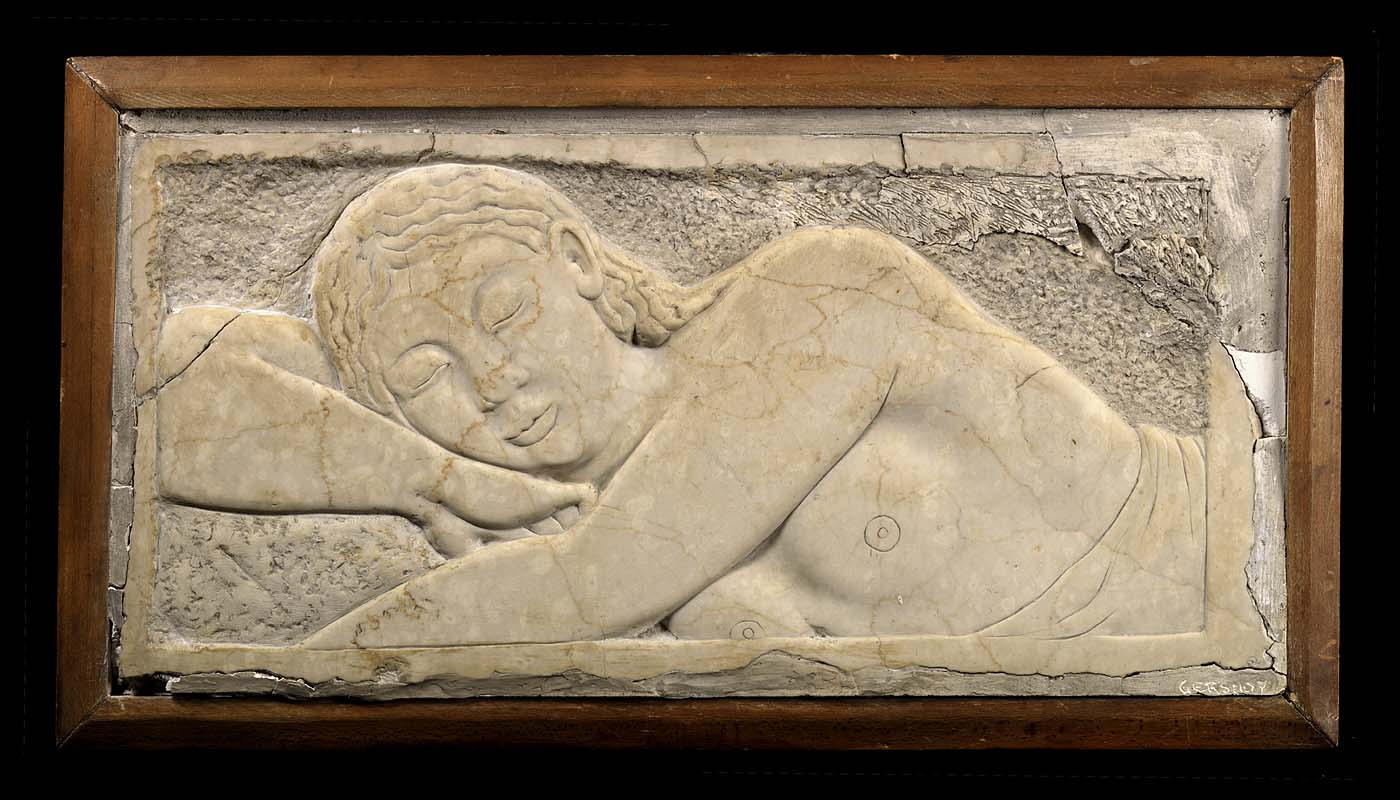
Sleep, 1925–1930

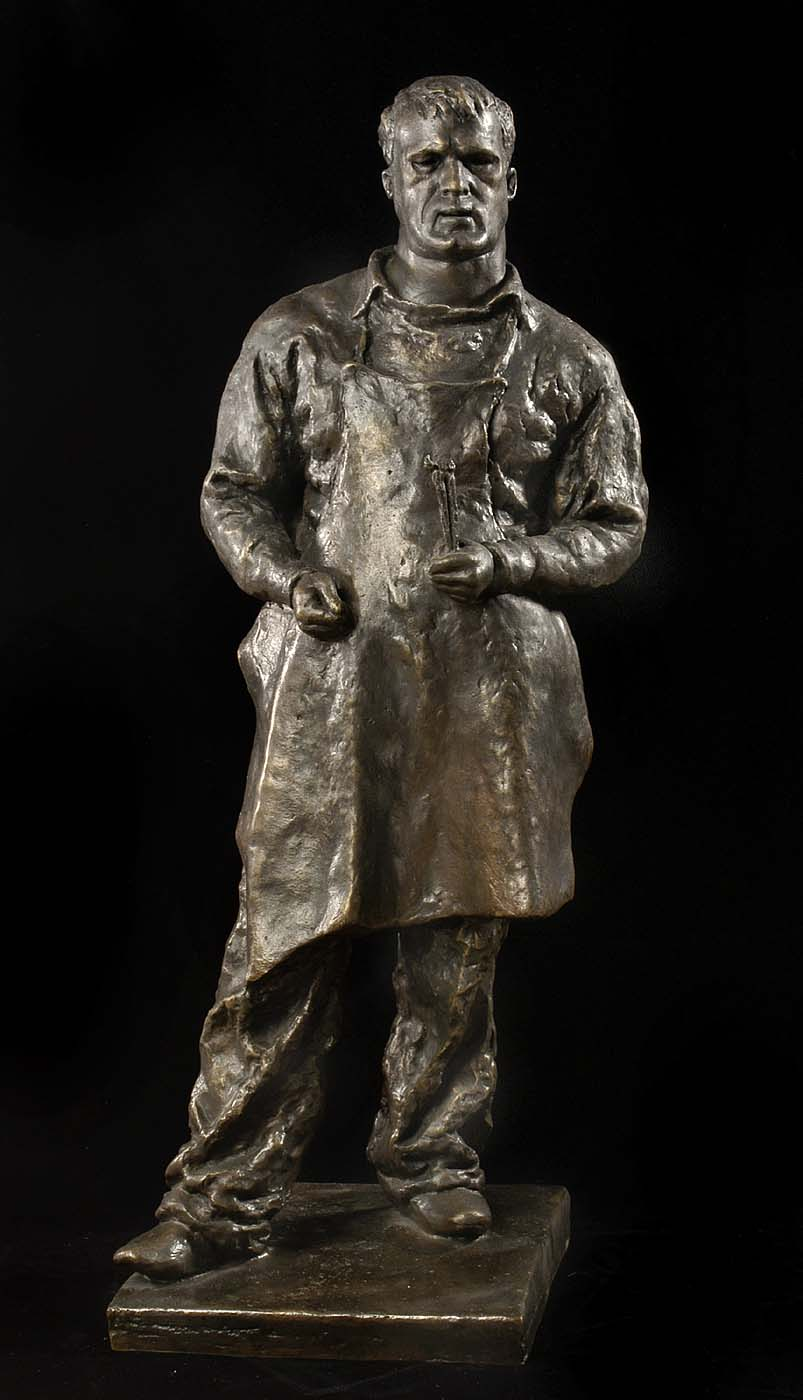
Arnold Blanch, 1934

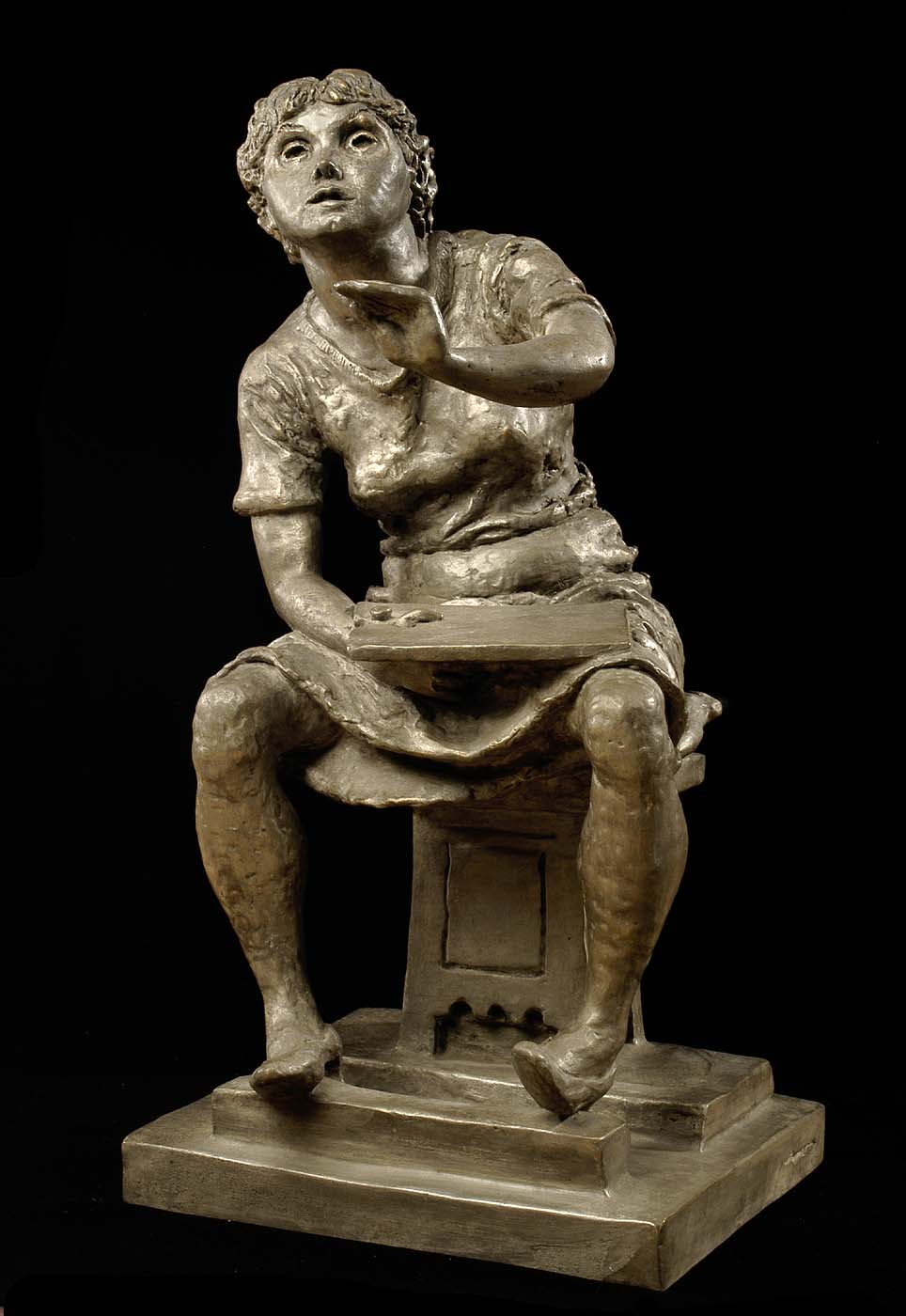
Lucile Blanch, 1936

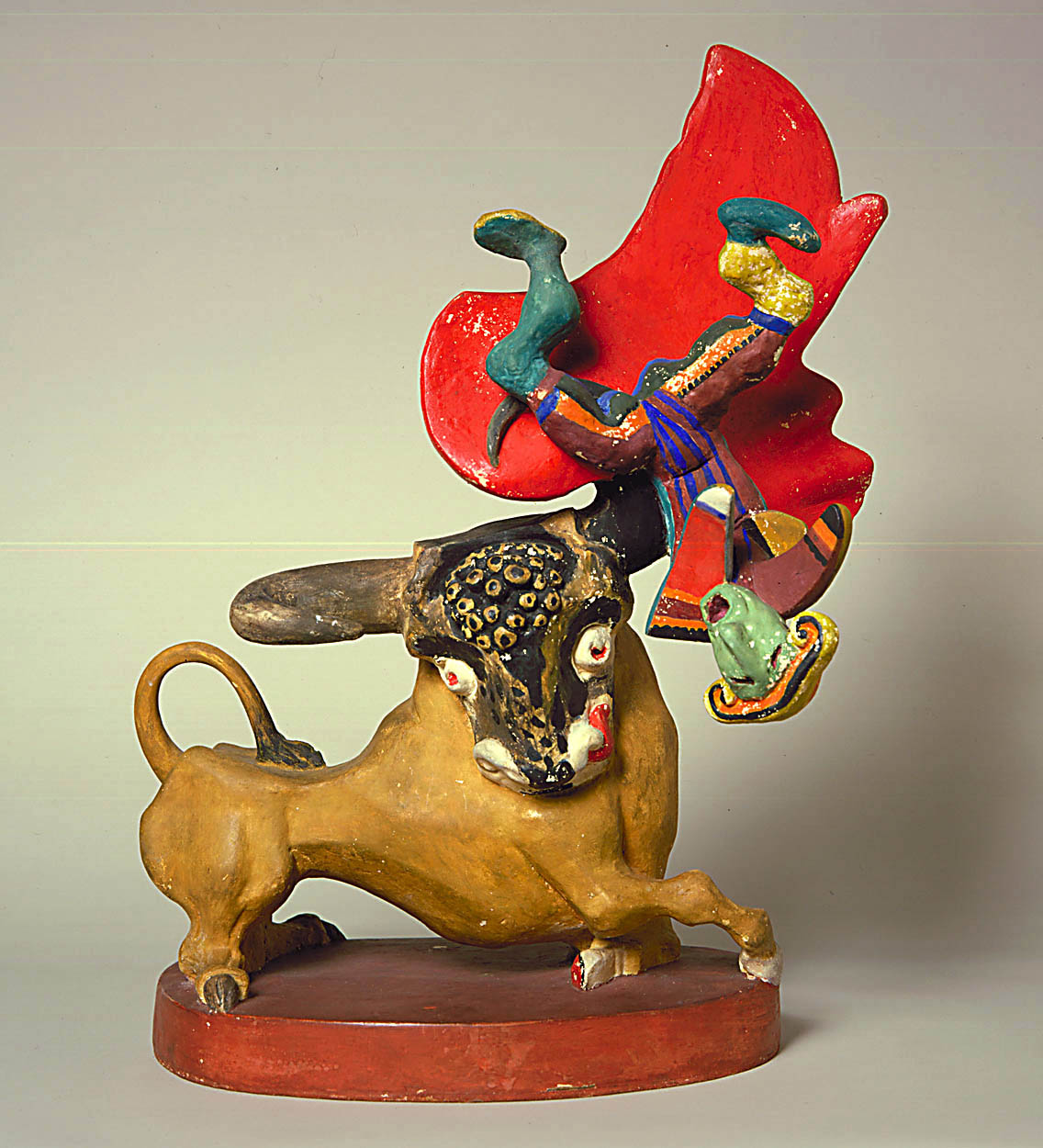
Ill-Fated Toreador, 1935–1939

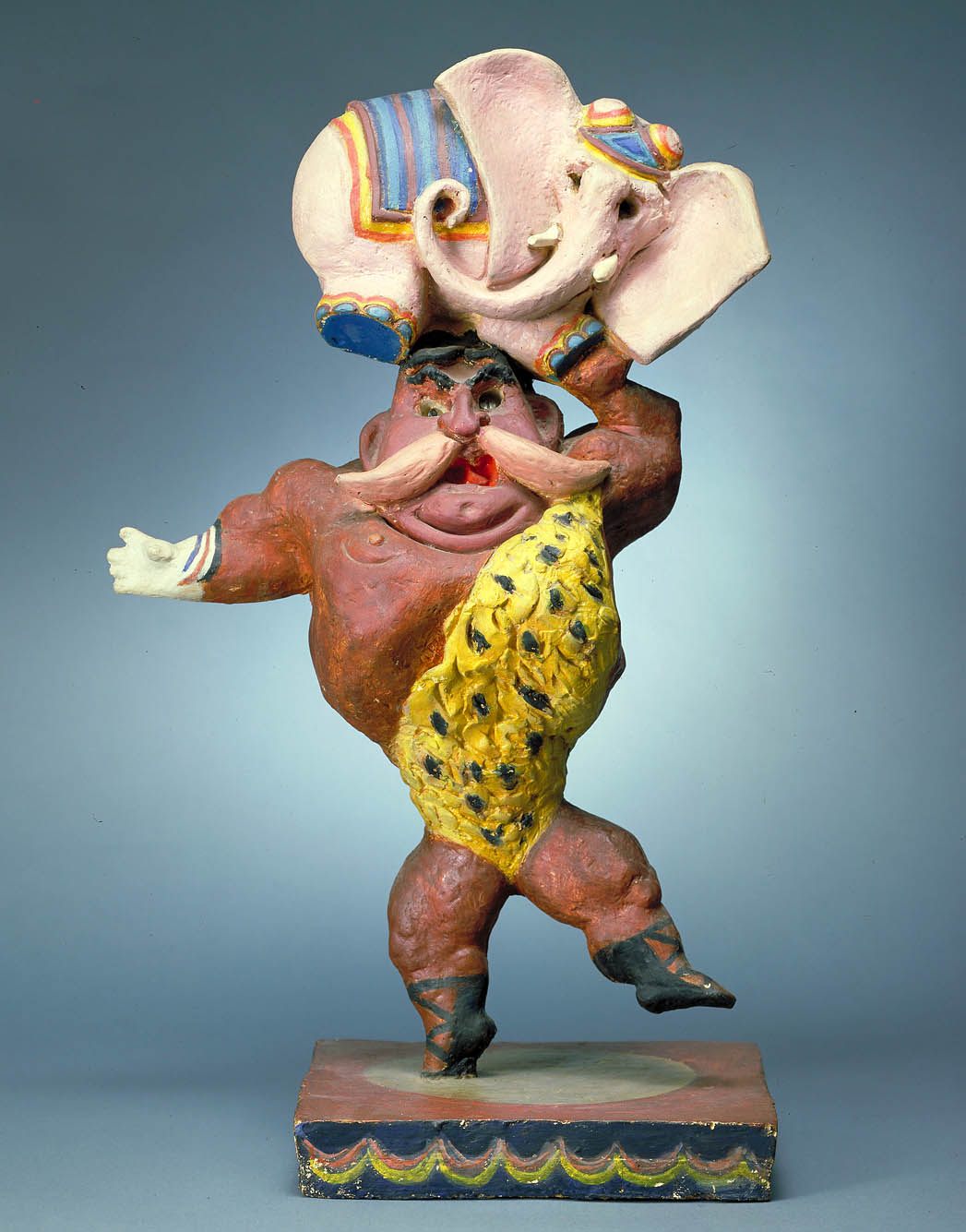
The Very Strong Man, 1936–1940

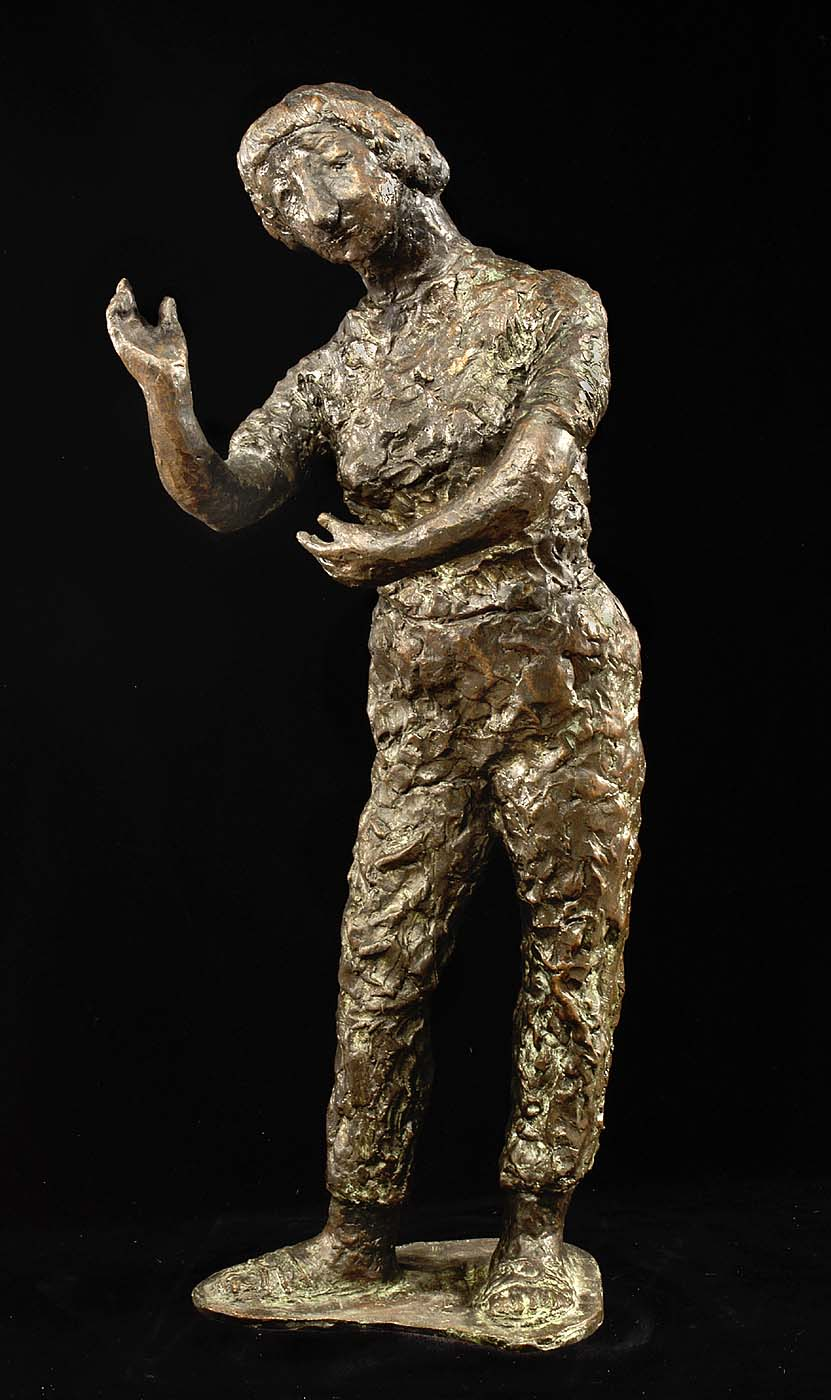
Self-Portrait, 1975
