= Lucile Blanch =

American artist (1895-1981)

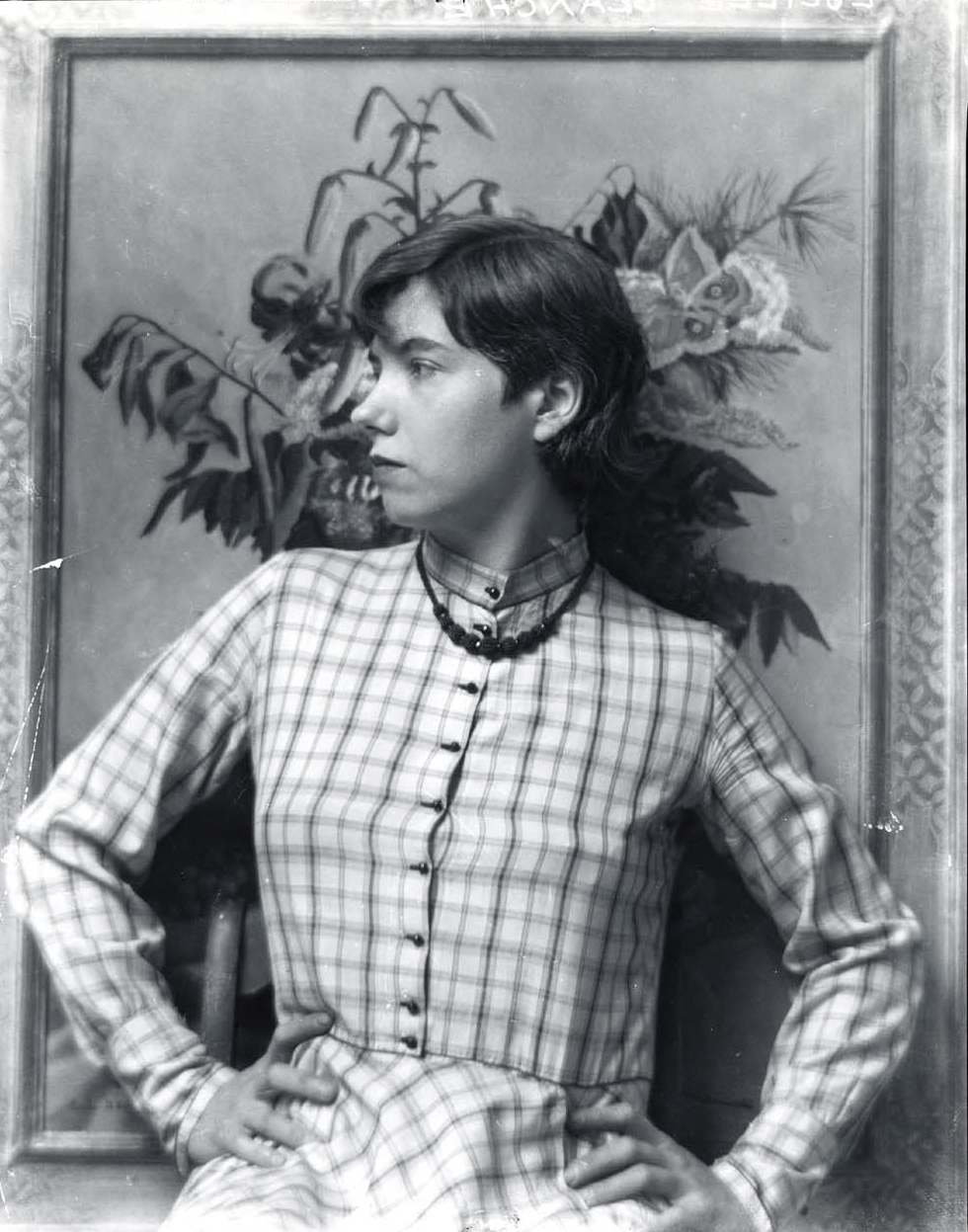
- Blanch in 1930
- Born: Lucile Esma Lundquist; December 31, 1895; Hawley, Minnesota, U.S.
- Died: October 31, 1981 (aged 85); Kingston, New York, U.S.
- Education: Minneapolis School of Art, Art Students League of New York
- Known for: Painting
- Spouse: Arnold Blanch (divorced)

Lucile Esma Lundquist Blanch (December 31, 1895 – October 31, 1981) was an American artist, and art educator. She was noted for the murals she created for the U.S. Treasury Department's Section of Fine Arts during the Great Depression. She was awarded a Guggenheim Fellow in 1933.

== Early life and education ==
Lucile Lundquist Blanch was born as Lucile Esma Lundquist in 1895 in Hawley, Minnesota to Charles E. and May E. Lundquist.

Raised in rural northern Minnesota, Blanch enjoyed gardening as a child. Her mother, a gifted musician, insisted on young Blanch starting strict piano lessons at age 7, though Blanch would eventually protest her lessons at 12 years old. After grade school, Blanch's mother signed her up for "teachers college," which she attended briefly before writing a 12-page letter (front and back) to her parents describing her desire to go to art school.

At the Minneapolis School of Art, she and future husband Arnold Blanch studied with notable artists like Harry Gottlieb and Adolf Dehn. From 1918, she studied with Boardman Robinson as part of the Art Students League of New York. She was only one of ten students in the country to be awarded full tuition to the Art Students League that year. Blanch also studied with artists Kenneth Hayes Miller, Frank Vincent DuMond and Frederick R. Gruger. She was friends with Eugenie Gershoy, who sculpted her at work.

She and Arnold Blanch married on November 23, 1920 in New York and traveled to France to continue their art studies. They later moved to Woodstock, New York where they helped develop the Woodstock art colony.

The couple was friends with Diego Rivera and Frida Kahlo, sharing the same studio building and telephone in San Francisco when Arnold was appointed a teaching position and Rivera was commissioned to paint two murals in the city. Blanch would remember Kahlo in her later years: "[Diego's] dear little wife--she and I became buddies...The four of us had a wonderful winter. They were very good playmates."

Blanch and her husband divorced in 1935.

== Career ==
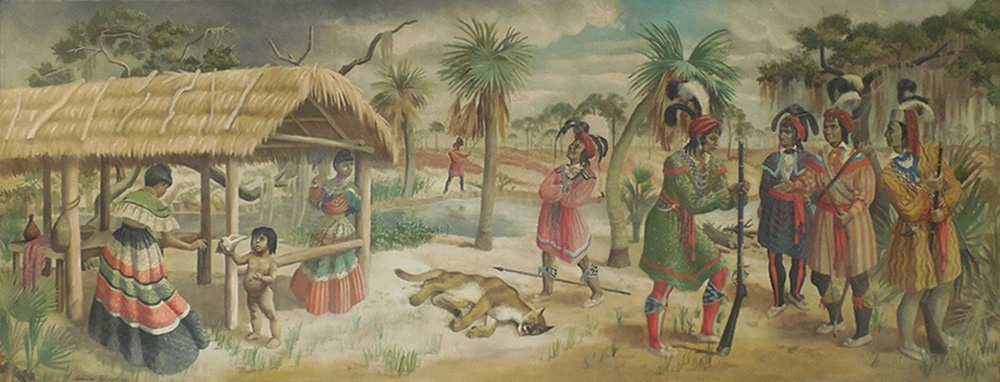
Osceola Holding Informal Court with His Chiefs (1938), Section of Painting and Sculpture mural for the post office in Fort Pierce, Florida

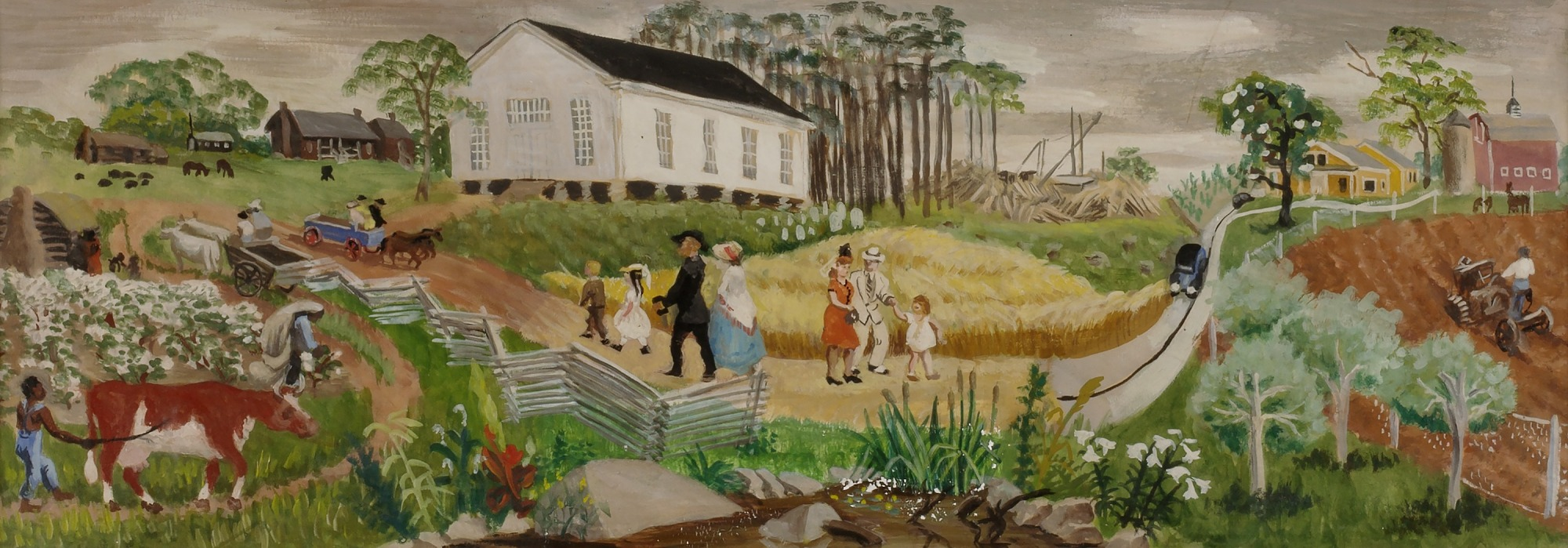
Study for Rural Mississippi from Early Days to Present (1941), mural for the post office at Tylertown, Mississippi

After moving to Woodstock, New York, Blanch began exhibiting work in local group shows as well as with the New York Society of Women Artists and the Whitney Studio Club. As she and husband Arnold were building their reputation as Woodstock artists, they supported themselves by selling tapestries they wove, as well as running a small cafeteria. They eventually would become key figures in the revitalization of the Woodstock art colony.

After Blanch received the Guggenheim Fellowship in 1933, her art was featured in a number of important venues, including the Whitney Museum of American Art. From 1932 to 1943, the Metropolitan Museum of Modern Art, the Museum of Modern Art, the Whitney Museum, and the Corcoran Gallery in Washington D.C. purchased her works for their collections.

After her divorce, Blanch taught at the Ringling School of Art in Sarasota, Florida from 1935 to 1936.

In 1937, Blanch had a solo exhibition of her work at the Milch Galleries. That same year, she was included an exhibition of paintings at the Whitney Museum of American Arts and in 1939, was in an annual contemporary American watercolor show there. Later in 1939, Blanch participated in an exhibition by the American Society of Painters, Sculptors, and Gravers. The exhibition began May 16, 1939 and continued until June 10 that same year.

In 1938, Blanch worked with artist Philip Evergood and George Picken in administrating the WPA Project in New York.

From 1938 to 1941, Blanch was an artist-in-residence at Converse College in Spartanburg, South Carolina, where she continued to teach until she turned 70 in 1965.

A retrospective of Blanch's long career was held at the Woodstock Artists Association in the fall of 1978, when the artist was 83 years old. The exhibition was reviewed by the Woodstock Times' Dennis Drogseth, as having "admirable successes...mixed with not so admirable failures--but that these inconsistencies are a part of the creative effort." Drogseth argued that, while Blanch insisted that her work remained the same over the course of her career, "...in style and approach Blanch has not been faithful to a single point of view."

=== Murals ===
Blanch was commissioned to create post office murals as part of a New Deal program through the Section of Painting and Sculpture, later called the Section of Fine Arts, of the U.S. Treasury Department. Murals were commissioned through competitions open to all artists in the United States. Almost 850 artists were commissioned to paint 1371 murals, most of which were installed in post offices. 162 of the artists were women. The murals were funded as a part of the cost of the construction of new post offices, with 1% of the cost set aside for artistic enhancements.

In 1938, Blanch painted a mural titled Osceola Holding Informal Court with His Chiefs in the post office in Fort Pierce, Florida. The mural is now on display at Fort Pierce City Hall. In the town of Appalachia, Virginia, she painted the mural Appalachia in 1940. The tempera mural, Rural Mississippi from Early Days to Present was completed in 1941 for the Tylertown, Mississippi post office. In addition, she painted murals for the post offices in Flemingsburg, Kentucky, and Sparta, Georgia. The Flemingsburg mural was completed in 1943, titled Crossing to the Battle of Blue Licks, and the Sparta post office project consisted of three panels depicting an antebellum plantation house, the granite quarry near Sparta, and local Hancock County scenery.

== Death ==
She died on October 31, 1981, in Kingston, New York and is buried in the Woodstock Artists' Cemetery in Woodstock, New York.

== Style ==
Blanch began her career focusing on realist subjects, but her art became increasingly abstract. By 1928, Blanch's style was set apart by color and humor. Her choice of subject at this time coming primarily from circus performers and animals shown depicted in spot lights.

== Awards ==
- In 1931, Blanch was awarded Medal of First Award for Graphic Arts at San Francisco Art Association's annual exhibit.
- In 1933, Blanch was given a fellowship by the John Simon Guggenheim Memorial Foundation to enable creative work in painting abroad for one year. The average monetary value of the fellowships given that year were $2,500 each.
- In 1934, received a prize for her work at the Wanamaker Regional Exhibition in New York.

== Gallery ==
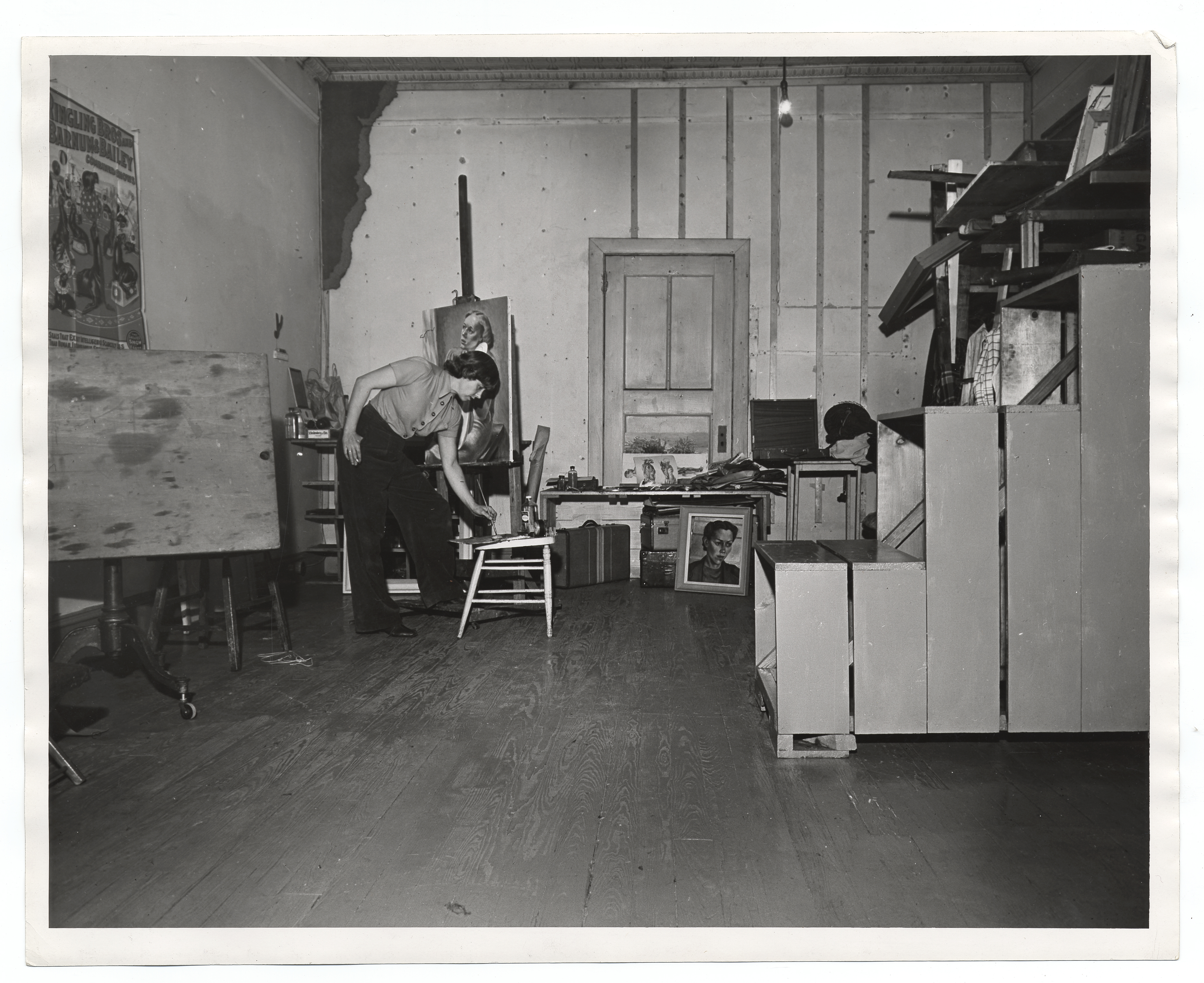
Blanch in her studio, 1940
