= Celina Fox =

English historian

- Born: 4 May 1947
- Education: University of Cambridge; University of Oxford
- Occupation: Historian
- Writing career
- Subjects: History of London

Celina Fox (born 4 May 1947) is an independent scholar specialising in the history of London in the 18th and 19th centuries. She held the role of Keeper of Paintings, Prints and Drawings at the Museum of London.

== Education and scholarship ==
Fox read history at Newnham College, Cambridge, graduating in 1969. She was a recipient of a Kennedy Scholarship in the same year, which involved a spell studying at Harvard University. She earned her DPhil from Oxford University in 1974, with a thesis titled Graphic Journalism in England during the 1830s and 1840s. She was a recipient of a Wingate scholarship in 2004. She received a research support grant from the Paul Mellon Centre in 2005 for research in the US and Sweden on the art of industry. Fox was a scholar at the Yale Center for British Art in 2012. She received a fellowship scholarship from the Lewis Walpole Library, Yale, in the same year for the Northern Grand Tour.

== Career ==
Fox was a founding curator for the Museum of London in the 1970s. In 1982, together with Professor Aileen Ribeiro, she organised an exhibition on the eighteenth-century masquerade. In 1987, as the museum's Keeper of Paintings, Prints and Drawings she wrote Londoners, a substantial book to accompany an exhibition of the same name. The exhibition was the first to “concentrate entirely on the inhabitants of the metropolis as they have been depicted in paintings, drawings and prints throughout the ages.” By c.1990 she was assistant director of the museum. In 1992 she was the coordinator of the exhibition London: World City, 1800-1842 that was staged at the Kulturstiftung Ruhr, Villa Hügel, Essen, the largest British loan exhibition ever staged in Germany.

Fox has worked on museum developments in Russia and Germany. She was a member of the Museums, Libraries and Archives Panel of the National Lottery Heritage Fund. In 1993, Fox made the final four for the position of Director for the Courtauld Institute Galleries.

=== Blue Plaques Panel ===
Fox was vice-chair for the Blue Plaques Panel of English Heritage. In 2013 she spoke out about the panel's budget being cut by 50%, saying “I fear Thurley’s proposals will lead to a dumbing down of the blue plaques scheme, by eroding the numbers and quality of those who assess the candidates.” She resigned the following year, along with Dr Margaret Pelling, in protest, citing that the scheme was “being dismantled and its previous achievements discredited.”

== Awards ==
- 2011 – Peter Neaverson Award for The Arts of Industry in the Age of Enlightenment
- 2012 – Historians of British Art (HBA) Book Award for exemplary scholarship on the period before 1800

== Publications ==
=== Author ===
- Education (1977) with P and G Ford, pub. Irish University Press, Dublin
- Masquerade (1983) with Aileen Ribeiro and Valerie Cumming, pub. Museum of London, London ISBN 978-0904818093
- Londoners (1987) pub. Thames & Hudson, New York ISBN 978-0500014097
- Graphic Journalism in England during the 1830s and 1840s (1988) pub. Garland, New York ISBN 978-0824000981
- Gardens in painting (1994) pub. National Gallery ISBN 978-1857090512
- The Arts of Industry in the Age of Enlightenment (2009) pub. Yale University Press, New Haven, in association with the Paul Mellon Centre for Studies in British Art ISBN 978-0300160420
- Designs (2009) with John Minshaw and Paul Redman, pub. Frances Lincoln, London ISBN 978-0711229778

=== Editor, contributor ===
- The Victorian City: Images and Realities (1973), pub. Routledge, London ISBN 978-0710073747
- London’s Pride: the glorious history of the capital’s gardens (1990) pub. The Museum of London, London ISBN 978-1854700322
- London – World City, 1800-1840 (1992) editor, author of introduction, pub. Yale University Press, New Haven ISBN 978-0300052848
- Silver: History and Design (1997), pub. Harry N Abrams, New York ISBN 9780810944718
- An Oxford companion to the Romantic Age: British culture, 1776-1832 (2001), pub. Oxford University Press, Oxford ISBN 978-0198122975
- Elegant Eating: Four hundred years of dining in style (2002), pub. V&A Publications, London ISBN 978-0810965935
- London 1753 (2003), pub. British Museum Press, London ISBN 978-1567922479
- The Wisdom of George the Third: Papers from a Symposium at the Queen’s Gallery (2004), pub. Royal Collection, London ISBN 978-1902163727
- Oxford Dictionary of National Biography: From the Earliest Times to 2000 (2004) pub. Oxford University Press, Oxford ISBN 978-0198613947
- Auctioneers who made art history (2014), pub. Hatje Cantz, Stuttgart ISBN 978-3775739030

=== Other writing ===
Fox has contributed to the following journals and magazines:

- House and Garden (contributing editor)
- Book Review Digest (reviewer)
- The Times Literary Supplement (reviewer)
- The Burlington Magazine (reviewer)
- Country Life (reviewer)
- The Royal Society of Arts Journal (reviewer)
- Print Quarterly (contributor)
- Urban History (reviewer)
- Past and Present (contributor)
- AA files (contributor)
- London Journal (contributor)
- Evening Standard (contributor)
- The Independent (contributor)

== Other ==
In 1979 Fox was a founding committee member of The Thirties Society (latterly The Twentieth Century Society).

In 1993, she spoke out against the choice of Charles Saumarez Smith as the new director for the National Portrait Gallery. In reference to the overlooking of the then deputy director Malcolm Rogers she said it showed “an extraordinary lack of judgment and is mischievously wasteful of talent. I don’t know any other country that would behave like this when there was an obvious candidate with no marks against him.”

In 1999, Fox suggested Nelson Mandela for Trafalgar Square's fourth plinth, saying that he was “universally thought of as a major figure of the 20th century.” She also suggested moving the statue of George IV, as “a less heroic figure is hard to imagine.”

Fox joined Simon Jenkins for several of his research tours when he was compiling England's Thousand Best Houses (2004) and England's Thousand Best Churches (2009).

She is on the editorial board of Print Quarterly and a trustee of the Harlech Scholar's Trust.
