= College Art Association =

American scholarly society

College Art Association of America
- Formation: 1911
- Type: Professional association
- Headquarters: New York, New York
- Location: United States
- Executive Director and CEO: Isimeme Omogbai
- Budget: $3.4 million
- Website: www.collegeart.org

The College Art Association of America (CAA) is the principal organization in the United States for professionals in the visual arts, from students to art historians to emeritus faculty. Founded in 1911, it "promotes these arts and their understanding through advocacy, intellectual engagement, and a commitment to the diversity of practices and practitioners." CAA currently has individual members across the United States and internationally; and institutional members, such as libraries, academic departments, and museums located in the United States. The organization's programs, standards and guidelines, advocacy, intellectual engagement, and commitment to the diversity of practices and practitioners, align with its broad and diverse membership.

== CAA publications, programs and grants ==
CAA publishes several academic journals, including The Art Bulletin, one of the foremost journals for art historians in English, and Art Journal, a quarterly journal devoted to twentieth- and twenty-first-century art and visual culture. The association also publishes two digital publications, caa.reviews, which is devoted to the peer review of new books and exhibitions relevant to the fields of art, art history, and architecture, and Art Journal Open, a forum for the visual arts that presents artists’ projects, conversations and interviews, and scholarly essays from across the cultural field.

CAA runs several programs to support and address issues in the visual arts field. These include the CAA-Getty International Program, Fair Use, CAA Conversations Podcast series, and RAAMP, Resources for Academic Art Museum Professionals.

CAA offers several grants to professionals in the field:

- CAA Getty International Program
- Millard Meiss Publication Fund
- Terra Foundation for American Art International Publication Grant
- Wyeth Foundation for American Art Publication Grant
- Art History Special Exhibition Travel Fund
- CAA Travel Grant in Memory of Archibald Cason Edwards, Senior, and Sarah Stanley Gordon Edwards
- Graduate Student Conference Travel Grants
- International Member Conference Travel Grants
- Samuel H. Kress Foundation CAA Conference Travel Fellowship for International Scholars
- CAA Professional Development Fellowships for Graduate Students

== The CAA Annual Conference ==
CAA holds its Annual Conference in February every year. The conference moves to different cities each year, returning to New York every other year. Cities that have hosted the CAA Annual Conference include Houston, Seattle, Boston, Washington, D.C., Los Angeles, Chicago, and other major American cities. Between four and six thousand members attend each year, depending on the location. The convention is the largest and most important of the year for makers and interpreters of visual art and visual culture. The conference typically includes more than 300 panels and sessions examining a wide array of topics and issues in the art world. The conference often offers free admission and behind the scenes tours of local cultural institutions and museums and several parties and receptions for attendees.

Highlights of the Annual Conference are the keynote address and Convocation Ceremony, which features the presentation of the Awards for Distinction. Previous keynote address speakers have included Charles Gaines, Mary Miller, Tania Bruguera, Dave Hickey, Jessica Stockholder, Robert Storr, Rocco Landesman, and many other noted academics, artists, curators, and art critics.

Each year, CAA honors a scholar in the field with the Distinguished Scholar Session. Previous awardees have included Wu Hung, Kaja Silverman, Richard J. Powell, Robert Farris Thompson, Rosalind Krauss, Linda Nochlin, James Cahill, and others.

The Annual Conference also features the Annual Distinguished Artist Interviews. The Annual Distinguished Artist Interviews comprise two back to back conversations between artists and an individual familiar with their work. Recent Artist Interviews have included Kellie Jones, Catherine Opie with Helen Molesworth, Judy Baca with Anna Indych-López, Coco Fusco with Steven Nelson, Katherine Bradford with Judith Bernstein, Joyce Scott with George Ciscle, and Rick Lowe with LaToya Ruby Frazier, among many others.

== CAA Awards for Distinction ==
CAA presents each year 14 Awards for Distinction.

- The Charles Rufus Morey Book Award (Charles Rufus Morey)
- The Alfred H. Barr Jr. Award
- The Alfred H. Barr Jr. Award for Smaller Museums, Libraries, Collections, and Exhibitions (Alfred H. Barr Jr.)
- The Frank Jewett Mather Award (Frank Jewett Mather)
- The Arthur Kingsley Porter Prize (Arthur Kingsley Porter)
- Art Journal Award
- The Distinguished Teaching of Art Award
- The Distinguished Teaching of Art History Award
- The Artist Award for a Distinguished Body of Work
- The Distinguished Artist Award for Lifetime Achievement
- The Distinguished Lifetime Achievement Award for Writing on Art
- The Distinguished Feminist Awards: one to an art historian and one to an artist
- The CAA/American Institute for Conservation Award for Distinction in Scholarship and Conservation
- The Excellence in Diversity Award

== See also ==
- Art Journal
- Audrey McMahon
