= Janet Turner Print Museum =

Coordinates: 39.729°N 121.843°W

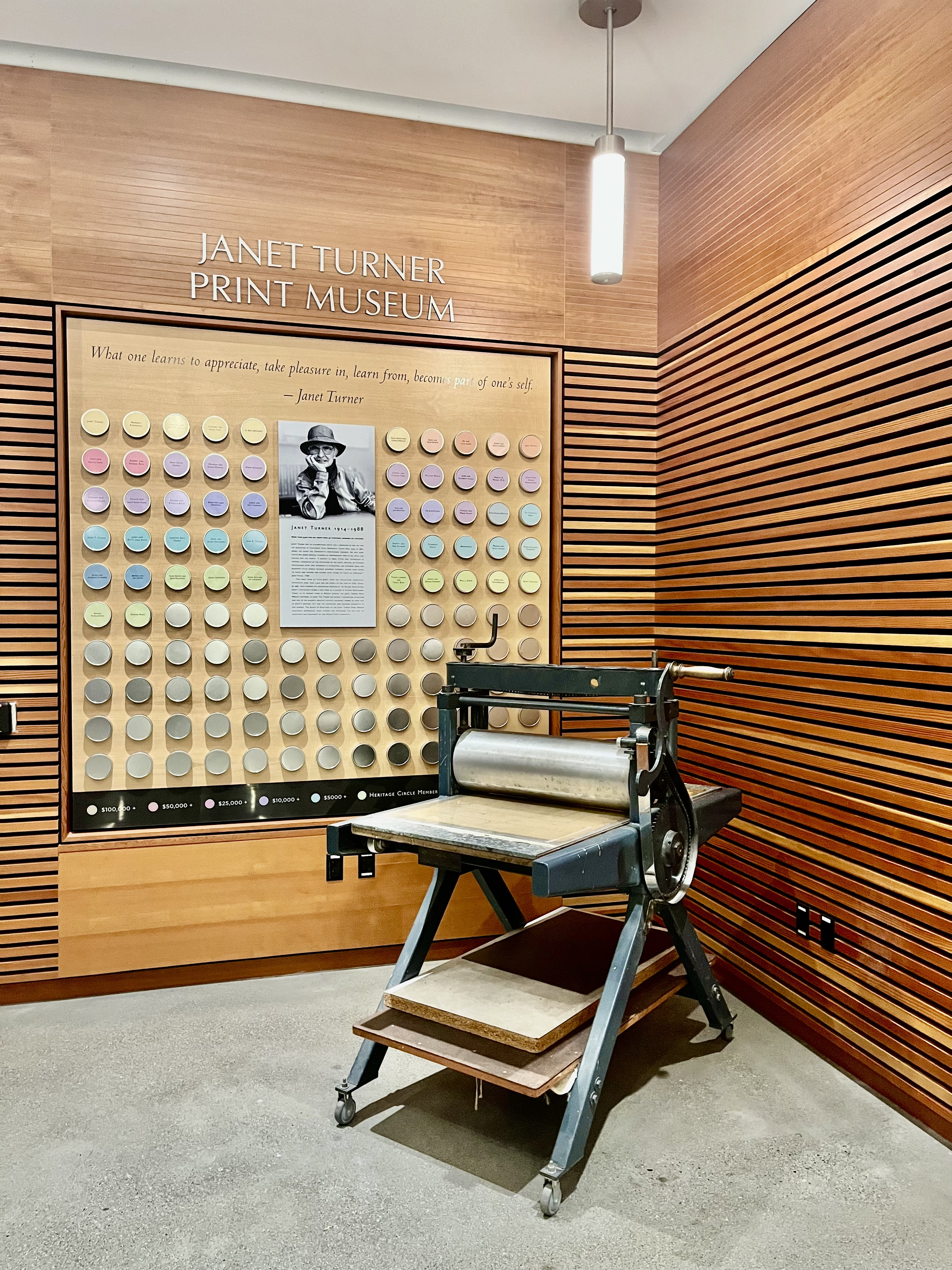

- Location within California
- Established: 1981
- Location: Chico, California, US
- Type: Art Museum
- Key holdings: Janet E. Turner, Salvador Dalí, Judy Chicago, David Hockney, Käthe Kollwitz, Pablo Picasso, Betye Saar, Rufino Tamayo, Kara Walker, Andy Warhol.
- Collections: Prints
- Collection size: 4000
- Founder: Janet E. Turner
- Curator: Rachel Skokowski
- Website: https://www.csuchico.edu/turner/

The Janet Turner Print Museum is an art museum on the campus of California State University Chico, California, United States. The museum first opened in 1981 to house the print collection of Janet E.Turner (1914–1988) an American artist and printmaker. Janet E. Turner's prints and paintings have been exhibited internationally in over 200 exhibitions in more than 50 countries. Janet E. Turner was a professor of art at California State University, Chico, between 1959 and 1981, and the Janet Turner Print Museum was created in her name. The Janet Turner Print Museum now houses a permanent collection of more than 4,000 prints from over 40 countries, including prints by contemporary printmakers and world-renowned artists, including Salvador Dalí, Judy Chicago, David Hockney, Käthe Kollwitz, Pablo Picasso, Betye Saar, Rufino Tamayo, Kara Walker, and Andy Warhol.

The museum is open to the public and charges no admission.

== History ==
The Janet Turner Print Museum first opened in 1981 on the campus of California State University, Chico to house 2000 prints donated from the personal collection of American artist and printmaker Janet E. Turner. Janet Turner's work is also included in the collections of the Smithsonian American Art Museum, the Seattle Art Museum, the Portland Art Museum, the Dallas Museum of Art, and the Pennsylvania Academy of Fine Arts, the Nelson-Atkins Museum of Art, and the Bywaters Special Collections at Southern Methodist University.

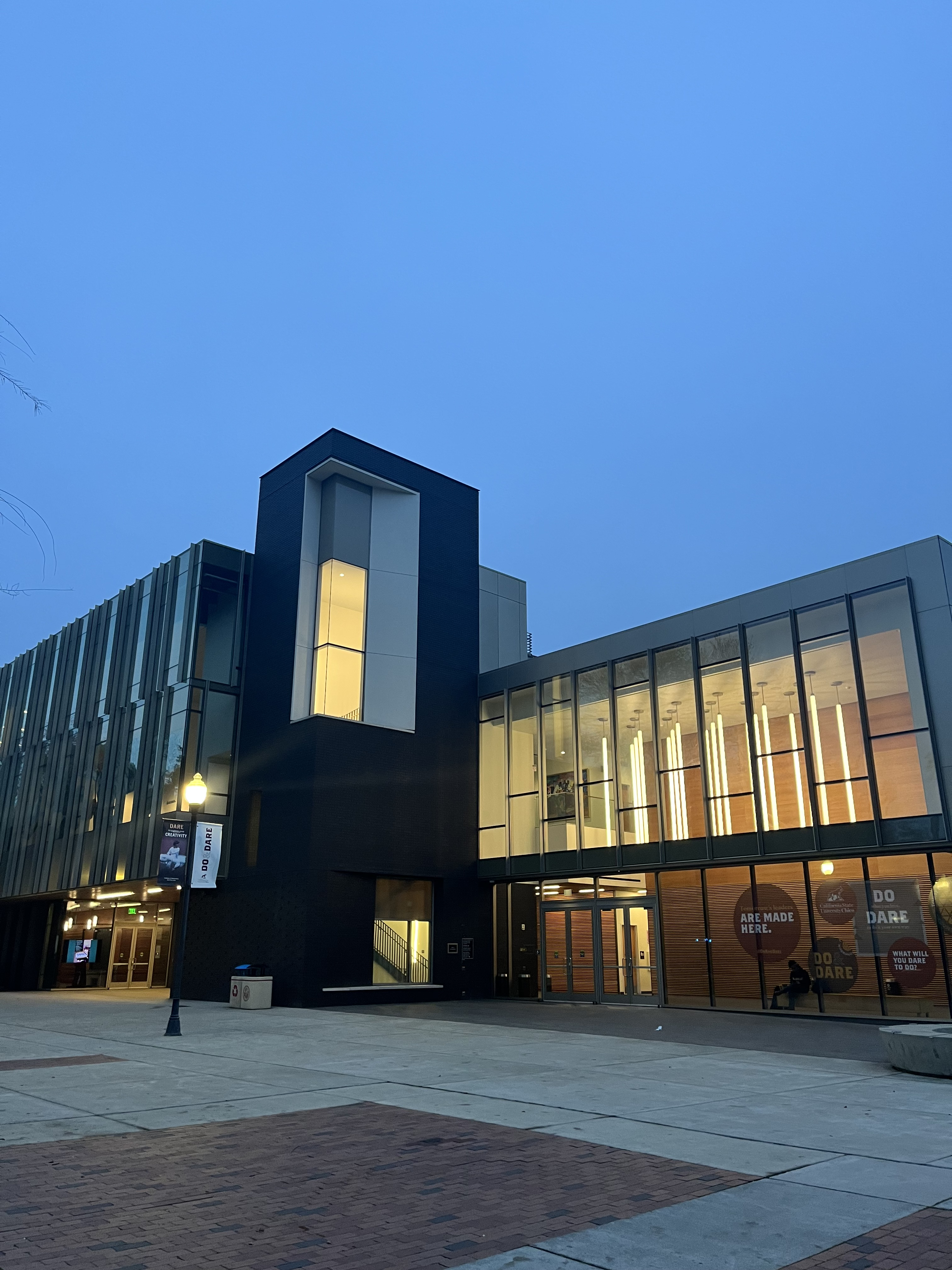
Arts & Humanities Building, California State University, Chico

In 2016, the museum moved into its current location in the new Arts and Humanities building on the California State University, Chico campus, with a dedicated museum gallery and archive room.

The museum collection continues to grow through donations including a significant donation in 2023 of prints by Northern California artists from the private collection of Reed Applegate. The permanent collection now includes over 4000 prints from over 40 countries, including prints by contemporary printmakers and world-renowned artists, including Salvador Dalí, Judy Chicago, David Hockney, Käthe Kollwitz, Pablo Picasso, Betye Saar, Rufino Tamayo, Kara Walker, and Andy Warhol.

In 2023 the Janet Turner Print Museum made its collection accessible online funded through a grant from the Henry Luce Foundation.

In 2024 the museum was recognized For Excellence in Museum Education by the California Association of Museums and California Department of Education, receiving the Superintendent’s Award for its Kids@TheTurner after school program for K-12 students.

== Affiliations ==
The Janet Turner Print Museum is a member of the following museum organizations

- American Association of Museums
- Association of Academic Museums and Galleries
- California Association of Museums
