= Print Quarterly =

- Discipline: Art
- Language: English
- Edited by: Rhoda Eitel-Porter

Publication details
- History: 1984–present
- Publisher: Print Quarterly Publications
- Frequency: Quarterly

Standard abbreviations
- ISO 4: Print Q.

Indexing
- ISSN: 0265-8305

Links
- Journal homepage

Print Quarterly is an international academic journal devoted to the history and art of printmaking, from its origins to the twentieth and twenty-first centuries. It is published in London four times a year, in March, June, September, and December. It was founded in 1984 by the scholar, patron of the arts and business man David Landau, who served as editor for twenty-eight years. The current editor Rhoda Eitel-Porter joined the staff of the periodical in September 2010. The journal's editorial board comprises notable academics and curators working in prints history and the graphic arts.

The journal publishes recent scholarship on all things related to prints. It covers the Western tradition in the graphic arts as well as Asian, Latin-American and African printmaking. Articles consider the role and import of the print from a number of perspectives including those of social and cultural history, iconography, biography, and collecting. Reviews of recent books related to the graphic arts and of catalogues of exhibitions of works on paper are also included.

Recent contributions have treated such diverse subjects as Francesco Salviati, the influence of a seventeenth-century fencing manual, Jean-Étienne Liotard, a quiz on an unidentified etching, the collector Pierre-Jean Mariette, Utagawa Kuniyoshi, Whistler, Soviet and Vietnamese posters, Jim Dine, comic strips, Ad Reinhardt, William Kentridge and digital prints.

The content lists for each volume from 1984 to 2009 are published online and can be searched at the journal's website, http://www.printquarterly.com, and through the Getty Research Institute's Bibliography for the History of Art.

== Editors ==
- David Landau: 1984 – December 2010
- Rhoda Eitel-Porter: September 2010 – present

== Editorial Board ==
Clifford Ackley, David Alexander, Judith Brodie, Michael Bury, Paul Coldwell, Marzia Faietti, Richard Field, Celina Fox, David Freedberg, Pat Gilmour, Antony Griffiths, Craig Hartley, Martin Hopkinson, Ralph Hyde, David Kiehl, Fritz Koreny, David Landau, Ger Luijten, Giorgio Marini, Jean Michel Massing, Nadine Orenstein, Peter Parshall, Maxime Préaud, Christian Rümelin, Michael Snodin, Ellis Tinios, Henri Zerner.
