= Audrey McMahon =

Federal Art Project, NY director (1898–1981)

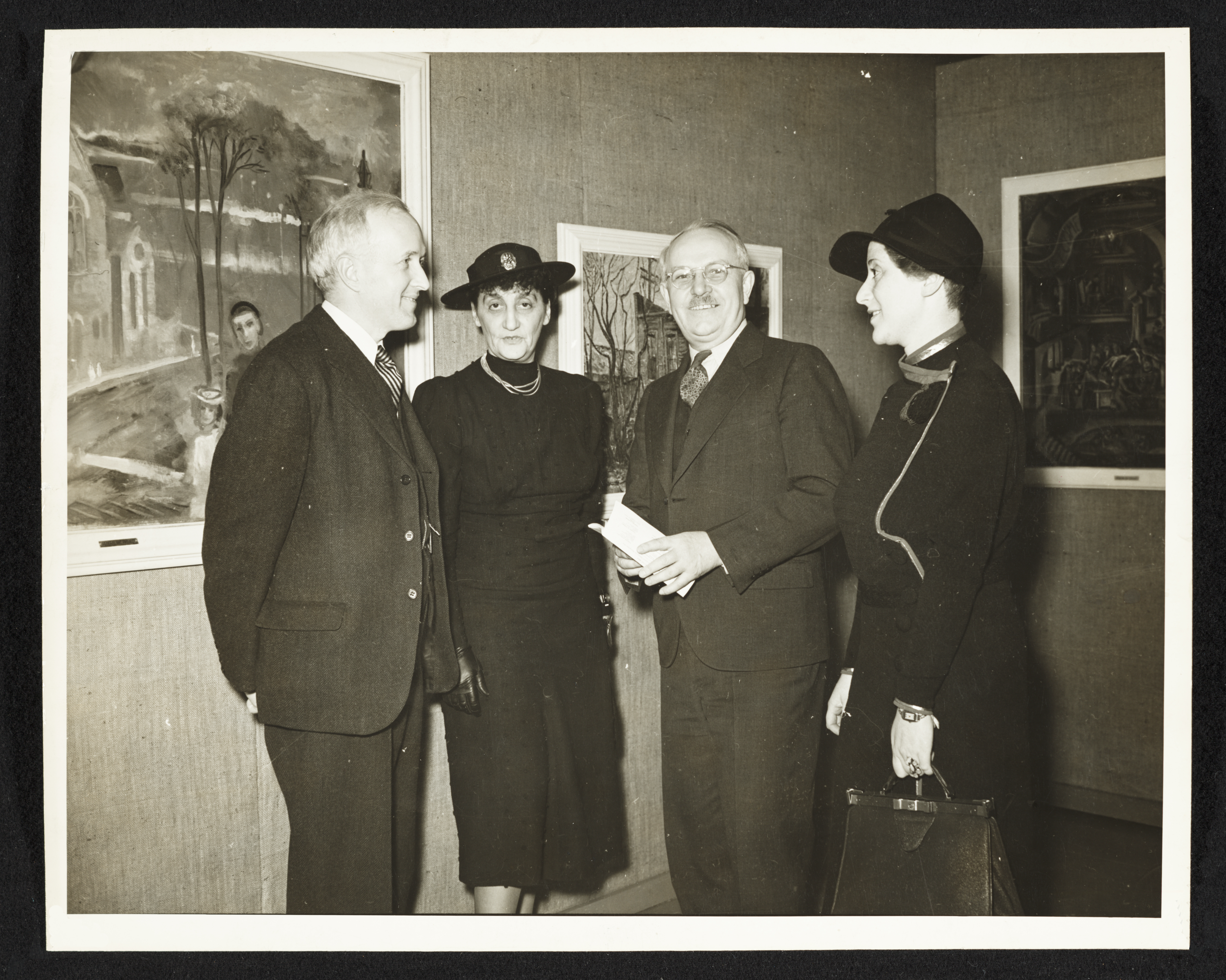
- Audrey McMahon (second from left), from the Archives of American Art
- Born: 1898; New York City
- Died: 1981 (aged 82–83); Greenwich Village, New York
- Education: Sorbonne
- Known for: Arts administration, Director, New York Region, Federal Art Project

Audrey McMahon (1898 – August 20, 1981) was the Director of the New York region of the Federal Art Project from 1935 to 1943; the region she oversaw included New York City, New Jersey, and Philadelphia. Born in New York City in 1898, she attended the Sorbonne, and she was the director of the College Art Association. She died August 20, 1981, at her home in Greenwich Village at the age of 87. Her approach to the administration of the Federal Art Project attempted to give the artists employed a great deal of freedom, and as she recalled later, "It is gratifying to note...that almost all of the painters, sculptors, graphic artists, and muralists who recall those days remember little or no artistic stricture." As the Federal Art Project began its conclusion in 1939, McMahon worked to delay the liquidation process, and the program changed to become the Graphic Section of the War Services Division in 1942, wherein "mural painters designed and executed camouflage patterns for tanks, ships, and many military objects", until the program was liquidated in January 1943 and McMahon resigned.

A 1977 sculpture by Eugenie Gershoy was titled "Homage to Audrey McMahon (Goddess of Fertility)," in recognition of the over 50,000 works of art produced in New York City during the first few years of the Federal Arts Project.
