= Bruce Dorfman =

American mixed media artist

Bruce Dorfman (born 1936) is an American mixed media artist and teacher whose work combines painting and assemblage. Dorfman has exhibited extensively in the United States and abroad, and has taught at the Art Students League of New York since 1964.

Dorfman was born in New York City in 1936. His father Robert, was a painter by avocation and his mother Ruth was an advocate of the arts. Dorfman recalls drawing and painting in a supportive environment from the age of five, and attended the Art Students League of New York, where he studied with Yasuo Kuniyoshi, Arnold Blanch and Charles H. Alston, at age 15 and 16. "The principal instructors," he said, "were highly influential, and I was very close to them.” Later, Dorfman attended the University of Iowa, and importantly studied with artists Stuart Edie, Mauricio Lasansky and historian Roy Seiber. His first solo exhibition was at the University of Iowa during that time. However, he graduated with a B.A. in Sociology social psychology in 1958.

Dorfman has had more than sixty solo exhibitions. He has received a Fulbright Fellowship, as well as awards and grants from the Pollock-Krasner Foundation; U.S. Department of State; Rockefeller Foundation; New York State Council on the Arts; New York World's Fair Invitational; Butler Institute of American Art; and the National Academy of Design.

Dorfman may take up to two months to complete an artwork, using paint, canvas, fabric, wood, metal and paper. He explains the process as alternating between activity and contemplation. “There is a lot of physical work that goes into it, and there is also a lot of sitting down and looking at it and knowing when to go for a walk or get a cup of coffee.”

In addition to the Art Students League, Dorfman has taught at Syracuse University, the Everson Museum and the New School, and was Artist-in-Residence at the Norton Museum of Art in West Palm Beach, as well as at museums and art schools in France, Venezuela and Portugal. Among Dorfman's best-known students have been Ai Weiwei and Bob Dylan. In the 1960s, Dylan and Dorfman were neighbors in Woodstock, New York, and Dylan often visited Dorfman in his studio for painting lessons. "He was very, very attentive," said Dorfman, "wonderfully attentive and absorbing it all very carefully." They playfully discussed creating "a giant flying art object that could materialize over cities, changing shape and color," and exchanged gifts of books and musical instruments.
