= Ellis Tinios =

Book historian at the University of Leeds

Ellis Tinios is a book historian at the University of Leeds.

Tinios is a specialist in the evolution of the illustrated book in Japan from 1615 to 1912, and the representation of China in Japanese books and prints of the 18th and 19th centuries.

== Selected publications ==
- Understanding Japanese woodblock-printed illustrated books: a short introduction to their history, bibliography and format, co-authored with Suzuki Jun (National Institute of Japanese Literature, Tokyo). Leiden: Brill, 2013.
- ‘Japanese illustrated erotic books in the context of commercial publishing, 1660-1868’ in Japan Review No. 26 (2013) Special Issue: Shunga: Sex and humour in Japanese art and Literature. Edited by Andrew Gerstle. pp. 83–96.
- Contributor to the exhibition catalogue Shunga: sex and pleasure in Japanese Art. Edited by Timothy Clark et al. British Museum Press, 2013.
- Japanese Prints: Ukiyo-e in Edo, 1700–1900. British Museum Press, 2010.
- ‘Pushing the Boundaries: Kuniyoshi and China’ in Impressions: The Journal of the Japanese Art Society of America, Inc., Number 31 (2010)
- ‘Art, anatomy and eroticism: The Human Body in Japanese Illustrated Books of the Edo Period, 1615-1868’. East Asian Science, Technology, and Medicine. Number 31 (2010), pp. 44–63.
- ‘Maruyama-Shijô ha gafu no mokuteki’ 円山四条派画譜の目的 ("The Purpose of Maruyama-Shijô School gafu") in Edo no ehon: gazô to tekisuto no ayanaseru sekai 江戸の絵本：画像とテキストの綾なせる世界 (Ehon in the Edo Period: a splendid world of interwoven image and text) (2010).
- ‘Once, twice, thrice-wrong’ [review article on the third edition of Christopher Hitchens. The Parthenon Marbles: the Case for Reunification] in Art Watch UK Newsletter No.25 (Autumn 2009)
- ‘Warrior Prints: a Double-edged Sword’, essay in Competition and Collaboration: The Utagawa School and Japan's Print Culture edited by Laura Mueller. Chazen Museum of Art, University of Wisconsin-Madison. November 2007.
- ‘The Fragrance of Female Immortals: Celebrity Endorsement from the Afterlife’ in Impressions: The Journal of the Ukiyo-e Society of America, Inc. Number 27 (2005-2006), pp. 43–53.
