= Verda Ligon =

American painter and printmaker

Verda Ligon (1902–1970) was an American painter and printmaker.

Born in Dallas, Ligon studied art in that city with Thomas M. Stell. She attended Southern Methodist University, the Detroit Institute of Arts, and the Phoenix Art Institute in New York City. For forty years she served as a schoolteacher in the Dallas public school system, and died in Dallas.

Ligon was a member of the Frank Reaugh Art Circle during her career. In 1939 she was one of eight women who founded the Printmakers Guild, later called Texas Printmakers, to challenge the male-dominated Lone Star Printmakers; the others were Lucile Land Lacy, Stella LaMond, Bertha Landers, Mary Lightfoot, Blanche McVeigh, Coreen May Spellman, and Lura Ann Taylor. She exhibited throughout Texas during her career. One of her paintings, an oil on Masonite entitled Jimson Weed, is currently owned by the Dallas Art Museum.
