= Reba White Williams =

American novelist (1936–2024)

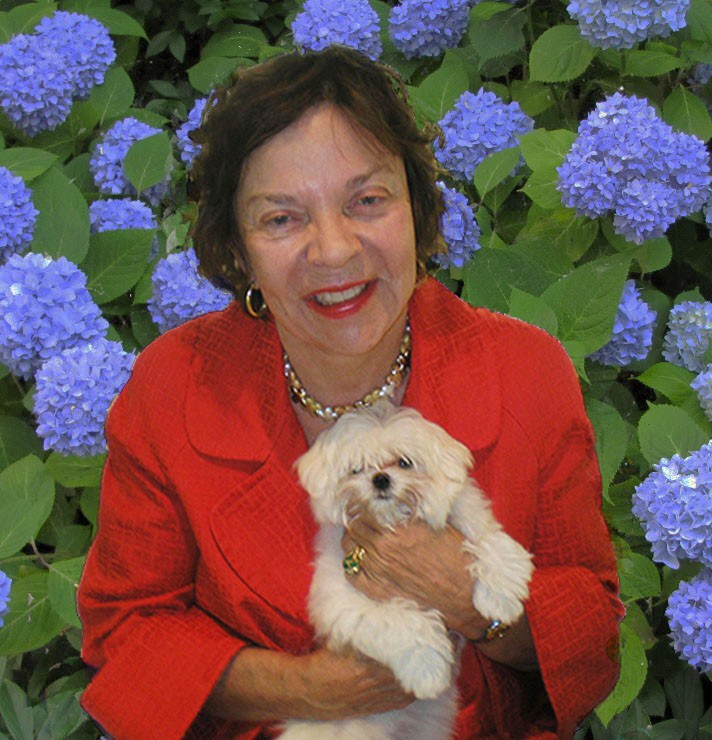
- White Williams in 2013
- Born: May 21, 1936; Gulfport, Mississippi, U.S.
- Died: October 14, 2024 (aged 88)
- Education: Duke University (BA); Harvard Business School (MBA); Hunter College (MA); CUNY Graduate Center (PhD)
- Occupation: Novelist
- Spouse: Dave H. Williams
- Writing career
- Language: English
- Genres: Mystery, Crime fiction, Cozy mystery
- Website: www.rebawhitewilliams.com

Reba White Williams (May 21, 1936 – October 14, 2024) was an American author, philanthropist, and expert on fine art prints. As a novelist, her influences include Agatha Christie and Dorothy L. Sayers. She and her husband, Dave H. Williams, built the world's largest private collection of American prints; they also founded the Print Research Foundation. She and Dave Williams are also co-creators of the Willie Morris Award for Southern Fiction.

White Williams was born in Gulfport, Mississippi, and grew up in Mississippi, Tennessee, and North Carolina. After moving to New York City, she worked as a library assistant/research analyst for McKinsey & Company, vice-president and securities analyst for Mitchell, Hutchins, contributing editor for Institutional Investor magazine, and director of special projects and member of the board of directors at Alliance Capital Management.

White Williams died on October 14, 2024, at the age of 88.

== Education ==
Reba White Williams received her high school diploma from Saint Mary's School in Raleigh, North Carolina, and attended Duke University, where she earned a Bachelor of Arts degree. She later earned an MBA at Harvard Business School in 1970, one of only 30 women in her class, and an M.A. in art history from Hunter College. She was awarded a Ph.D. in art history from the CUNY Graduate Center, where her dissertation focused on the Weyhe Gallery and its role in American printmaking between the wars, 1919–1940. She also held an M.A. in fiction writing from Antioch University. She was awarded an honorary Doctor of Humane Letters from CUNY Graduate Center in June 2016.

== Career ==
White Williams spent nine years with McKinsey & Company, where her assignments included projects in London and Dar es Salaam, Tanzania. After completing her MBA at Harvard Business School, she joined Mitchell Hutchins, Inc., as a securities analyst. She served five years as contributing editor of Institutional Investor magazine.

From 1991 to 2001, White Williams served as director of special projects for Alliance Capital Management, where she was also a member of the board of directors.

In 1999, White Williams ran unsuccessfully for the New York City City Council in District 4.

From 2001, White Williams worked as a full-time writer and researcher. Her articles appeared in business periodicals and art journals, including American Artist, Business and Society, Financial Analysts Journal, Journal of the Print World, Mystery Readers Journal, Print Collectors Newsletter, Print Quarterly, South Magazine, and The Tamarind Papers.

=== Novels ===
- Restrike, the first novel in the Coleman and Dinah Green series, was published in 2013 by Delos, the fiction imprint of Axios Press and was reissued in 2014 by The Story Plant.
- Fatal Impressions, the second in the series, was published in April 2014 by The Story Plant.
- Angels, a prequel to the series, was published in December 2014.
- Bloody Royal Prints was published in July 2015 by Tyrus Books.

=== Print collecting ===
In 1975, Reba White Williams and Dave H. Williams began to collect American fine-art prints, focusing on the first half of the twentieth century. Over the next 33 years, utilizing White Williams's research skills, they built a collection of more than 5,000 prints. Between 1987 and 2009, the Williamses organized, researched and oversaw the circulation of 18 exhibitions from the collection that traveled to more than 100 museums in the United States, Canada, Mexico, Europe, and Japan.

The Williamses created the Print Research Foundation in 1994 as a research and study facility on American prints. In December 2008, Reba and Dave Williams donated their American print collection of more than 5,200 works and the Print Research Foundation and its facilities (the building, library, and archives) to the National Gallery of Art. The collection was described as "unrivaled in scope," and Gallery Director Earl A. Powell III called it "a transformational acquisition".

The annual Reba and Dave Williams Prize was created in 1993 for outstanding essays on American printmaking, as judged by the Editor and Editorial Board of Print Quarterly. The prize was last awarded in 2006. The couple also funded the documentary All About Prints, which aired on PBS stations in 2009.

=== Willie Morris Award for Southern Fiction ===
Since 2007, Reba White Williams and Dave H. Williams have sponsored the Willie Morris Award for Southern Fiction, named after the journalist and author Willie Morris. The award is given to a novel set in one of the original eleven Confederate States of America that reflects the spirit of Morris's work and stands out for the quality of its prose, its originality, its sense of place and period, and the appeal of its characters.

An independent panel of judges votes on the award from books submitted for consideration. Recipients of the award include:

- 2007: The King of Colored Town by Darryl Wimberley
- 2008: City of Refuge by Tom Piazza
- 2009: Secret Keepers by Mindy Friddle
- 2010: Crooked Letter, Crooked Letter by Tom Franklin
- 2011: If Jack's In Love by Stephen Wetta
- 2012: A Short Time to Stay Here by Terry Roberts
- 2013: Nowhere But Home by Liza Palmer
- 2014: Long Man by Amy Greene
- 2015: The Headmaster's Darlings: A Mountain Brook Novel by Katherine Clark With Special Recognition awarded to Sarah Addison Allen
- 2016: Last Ride to Graceland by Kim Wright

=== Honors and awards ===
White Williams served on the Print Committees of The Boston Museum of Fine Arts, The Metropolitan Museum of Art, The Museum of Modern Art, and The Whitney Museum. She served on the editorial board of Print Quarterly, and was named an Honorary Keeper of American Prints by the Fitzwilliam Museum at Cambridge University. White Williams also served as president of the New York City Art Commission, and as vice chairman of the New York State Council on the Arts.

She also received awards, including:

- 1988: The Augustus Graham Medal, presented on behalf of the Brooklyn Museum of Art Board of Trustees, for outstanding support of the arts
- 1997: The Polish Order of Merit, Cavalier of the Grand Cross of Poland, First Class, honoring contributions to the financial industry in Poland
- 2000: Swan Award for lifetime achievement for furthering the arts both nationally and internationally, Cheekwood Museum
- 2000: Pratt Institute, Pratt Legend
- 2001: Gold Medal Award from the Queen Sofia Spanish Institute
- 2016: Honorary Degree from The Graduate Center, CUNY
