= Mary Lightfoot =

American painter

Mary L. Lightfoot (1889–1970) was an American painter and printmaker.

Lightfoot was born in Ravenna, Texas.

She summered in Europe and in Taos, New Mexico during her career. Late in life Lightfoot moved to Paris, Texas, remaining there for fifteen years until her death. She was buried in Paris; her death certificate gives her year of birth as 1888.

== Education ==
Lightfoot received a baccalaureate from the College of Industrial Arts in Denton. After studies at the North Texas State Teachers College, she received a master of arts degree from Columbia University. Lightfoot taught in the public school system of Dallas until her retirement. She summered in Europe and in Taos, New Mexico during her career. Late in life she moved to Paris, Texas, remaining there for fifteen years until her death. She was buried in Paris; her death certificate gives her year of birth as 1888.

== Career/Organization ==
Lightfoot was an art teacher at the Dallas Independent School District.

In 1940, she was one of eight women who founded the Printmakers Guild, later called Texas Printmakers, to challenge the male-dominated Lone Star Printmakers; the others were Lucile Land Lacy, Stella LaMond, Bertha Landers, Verda Ligon, Blanche McVeigh, Coreen May Spellman, and Lura Ann Taylor. Lightfoot exhibited widely in Texas during her career.

Their group was created as a result from being denied membership in the male established Lone Star Printmakers. There was a total of fifty members and participants and not until 1961 did two men join. Most members were either public school teachers or university professors.

== Honors/Awards ==
Lightfoot was awarded the Junior League Purchase Prize, "Fourth Annual Texas Print Exhibition", Dallas Museum of Art, 1965.

== Affiliations ==
Lightfoot was the President of the Dallas Print Society in 1943.
