= Chinese Culture Center =

Non-profit organization in San Francisco

Chinese Culture Center of San Francisco
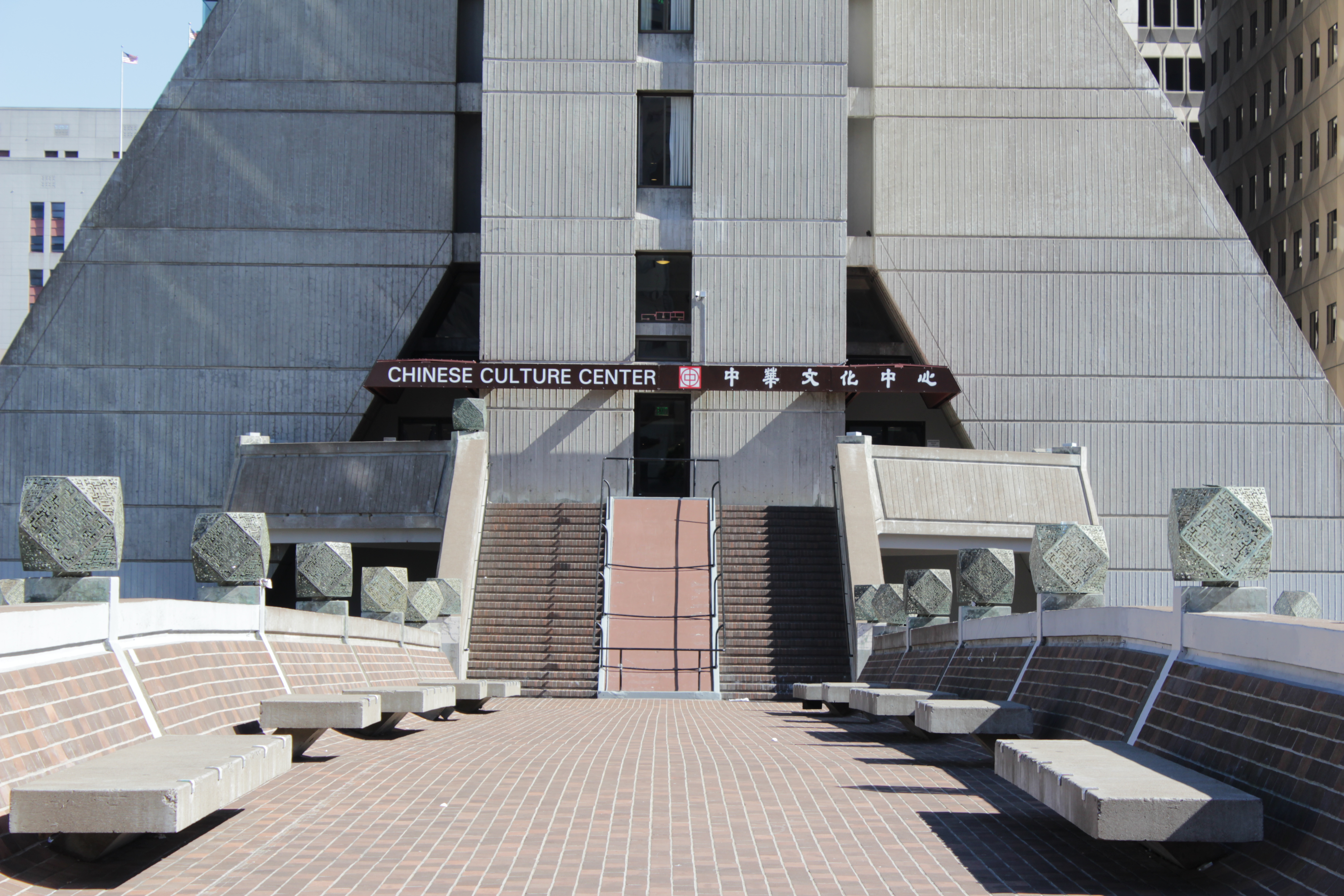
- Abbreviation: CCC
- Formation: 1965; 61 years ago
- Founder: J.K. Choy
- Type: 501(c)(3) nonprofit arts organization
- Purpose: CCC's mission is to elevate the underserved and be a voice for equality through contemporary arts and education
- Headquarters: San Francisco Chinatown
- Location: 750 Kearny St., 3rd Floor, San Francisco, California, U.S. 94108
- Executive Director: Jenny Leung
- Staff: Hoi Leung, Curator
- Website: www.cccsf.us

The Chinese Culture Center of San Francisco (or CCC) (simplified Chinese: 旧金山中华文化中心; traditional Chinese: 舊金山中華文化中心; pinyin: Jiùjīnshān Zhōnghuá Wénhuà Zhōngxīn; Jyutping: Gau^{6}gam^{1}saan^{1} Zung^{1}waa^{4} Man^{4}faa^{3} Zung^{1}sam^{1}) is a community-based, non-profit organization established in 1965 as the operations center of the Chinese Culture Foundation located in Hilton San Francisco Financial District, at 750 Kearny Street, 3rd Floor, San Francisco, California, United States.

The CCC's activities have shifted focus throughout its existence. In the 2010s the center focused on contemporary art exhibitions and interventions, under the vestige of the CCC Visual Arts Center, as well as on radical, social justice education initiatives, under the vestige of the Him Mark Lai Learning Center.

== Overview ==
The facilities of the center, totaling 20,000 square feet (1,900 m^{2}), include a 299-seat auditorium, a 2,935-square-foot (272.7 m^{2}) gallery, a gallery shop, classroom, and offices. It is located between Chinatown and the Financial District.

Since 2020, Jenny Leung is the executive director. From 2009 to 2019, the executive director was Mabel Teng, a former member of the San Francisco Board of Supervisors and former a City Accessor-Recorder.

== History ==
=== Founding ===
The city government put up city-owned land that formerly housed the Hall of Justice for sale. As a compromise, founder J.K. Choy struck a deal with the developer for a 20,000 square foot facility dedicated to community cultural activities.

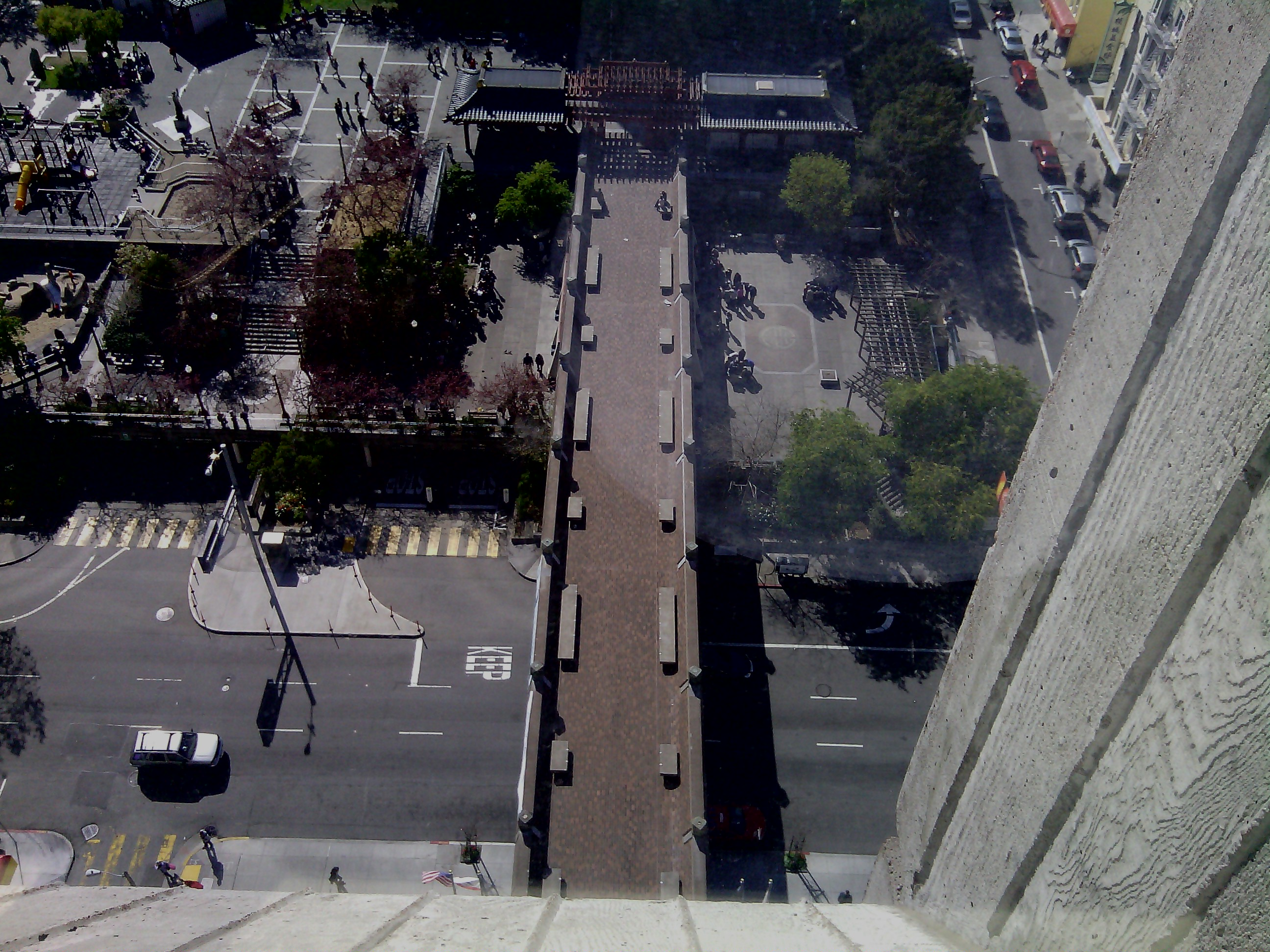
Bridge from Portsmouth Square (seen on top) to the Hilton hotel building which houses the Chinese Culture Center

The Chinese Culture Foundation of San Francisco incorporated on October 15, 1965. Another compromise led to the modification of the planned Portsmouth Square pedestrian bridge to accommodate the future activities. Holiday Inn was completed in January 1971, while the bridge was completed in August 1971. After some political tensions between CCF and the heavily Nationalist majority faction in Chinatown, work began on the Chinese Culture Center facilities on January 27, 1973.

=== Beginning operations ===
Early activities were marked by a desire to be non-controversial and non-political because of tense Taiwanese-PRC relations and factions within Chinatown.

The center began hosting workshops and classes on Mandarin language, folklore, martial arts, music, painting and calligraphy, crafts, drama, dance, and shadow play. It also held celebrations of the Spring Festival and Mid-Autumn Festival. Docent-guided tours of Chinatown began in 1974.

Some of the CCC's early art programs were coordinated with local museums, such as the Asian Art Museum of San Francisco.

=== 1980s and 1990s ===
1989, CCC received a grant to implement an annual program called In Search of Roots. Each year, ten American-born Chinese youth interns who wished to trace their ancestries to the Pearl River Delta, under CCC guidance, researched their family histories, visited their ancestral villages, and contributed findings to an annual CCC exhibit.

Following relaxation of US-PRC relations, CCC began sponsoring public lectures on Chinese arts and culture by scholars. After the reform and opening up in China and democracy in the Republic of China on Taiwan, the Two Chinas became less hostile, so older Chinatown organizations began to cooperate with the Chinese Culture Center in the 1990s.

== Present-era ==
With the hire of Abby Chen as Program Director in 2008, the Chinese Culture Center began to focus solely on contemporary art, an initiative rebranded as the CCC Visual Arts Center. The center began publishing catalogues of its exhibitions for sale and archival purposes for archives such as Asia Art Archive.

CCC's education initiative was dedicated as the Him Mark Lai Learning Center in 2013.

Focusing on community-based, socially-engaged art interventions, in 2013, CCC opened 41 Ross, a pop-up art gallery space in historic Ross Alley that promotes dialogue amongst artists and local residents. 41 Ross is operated in partnership with the Chinatown Community Development Center.

CCC's public artwork, Sky Bridge, was honored as the "Best Public Art" of 2015 by KQED.

In 2016, the Portsmouth Square Pedestrian Bridge was dedicated as the Rolland Lowe Bridge in honor of the Lowe family's patronage and strong support of CCC.

== Arts programs ==
=== Exhibitions ===
In the CCC Visual Arts Center, CCC has produced over 100 quarterly, rotating gallery exhibitions of various styles, media, and modalities.

These exhibitions are centered on the XianRui 鮮銳 Artist Excellence Series (also known as "Fresharp") curated by Abby Chen. XianRui鮮銳 is an award-based solo exhibition that rewards innovative, mid-career, contemporary Chinese and Chinese-American artists.

XianRui鮮銳 has included:

- Beili Liu's "Lure" (2008): A series of installations of thousands of hand-coiled disks of red thread suspended from the ceiling, borrowing from the ancient Chinese legend of The Red Thread.
- Stella Zhang's "0 Viewpoint" (2010): Sculptural, monochromatic installations and sculptures exploring femininity, sexuality, and nationality.
- Zheng Chongbin's "White Ink" (2011): Fifteen new and site-specific large scale abstract ink paintings and video projections, innovating traditional Chinese ink painting.
- Summer Mei Ling Lee's "Into the Nearness of Distance" (2014): Experimental installation exploring and transcending complications of inter- and counter-relationships.

"WOMEN我們", a traveling exhibition curated by the CCC's program director Abby Chen that examined feminist, queer, and gender-expansive arts-activism in contemporary China, opened in Shanghai in 2011, came to the CCC Visual Arts Center in 2012, and was exhibited in Miami in 2013.

CCC's other exhibitions series include "Episode", which invites guest curators and artists to expand CCC's programmatic rhetoric, as well as "Present Tense", which gives platform to young, emerging artists.

=== Public site-based art ===
CCC's initiatives have focused on community-based arts in the form of public artworks, as well as arts-based interventions. Much of this site-based art is rooted in 41 Ross (in Ross Alley), CCC's pop-up, collaborative art space that opened in 2013.

Notable public art projects include:

- "Central Subway Public Art Project" (2013): A collection of murals by Justin Hoover in Wentworth Alley.
- "Sky Bridge" (2015): A temporary public artwork by Beili Liu consisting of 50,000 pieces of reflective mylar epoxied to the Lowe Pedestrian Bridge to reflect the sky.
- "Liminal Space/Crossings" (2016) A public art installation of an ocean projected in Ross Alley by Summer Mei-Ling Lee.

Notable arts-based interventions include:

- "Occupy Shanghai Subway" (2012): A public intervention in which feminist activists donned artworks from WOMEN我們 and held signs in the subway to protest sexual harassment.
- "San Francisco Chinatown Keywords School" (2013): A socially-engaged art project and relational aesthetics work by artist Xu Tan. Public space was transformed into a workshop for youth to collect, explore, and create "key words" via artistic analysis and creation.
- "Sunrise" (2016): A space-based intervention that transforms the Rolland Lowe Pedestrian Bridge into a park with landscape design and a mosaic by Mik Gaspay.

== Education and engagement programs ==
CCC's education initiative was dedicated as the Him Mark Lai Learning Center in 2013, serving as the hub for its tours, both Chinatown Walking Tours and California Roots Excursions, as well as lectures, which were rebranded as Thought Leader Seminars. Past seminar leaders include Timmy Yip, Gordon H. Chang, Yu Xinqiao, and Elizabeth Sinn.

CCC has also continued to put on festivals for citywide audiences and Chinatown residents, activating Chinatown with political and artistic consciousness by inviting local artists to intervene in local spaces. These include the Chinatown Music Festival in late summer, the Spring Festival in the spring, and Dancing on Waverly in early fall.

== See also ==
- Yerba Buena Center for the Arts
- Museum of the African Diaspora
- Asian Art Museum of San Francisco
- Chinese Historical Society of America (also based in San Francisco)
- Museum of Chinese in America (based in New York City)
- Artivism
- History of the Chinese Americans in San Francisco
