= DCKT Contemporary =

Art gallery in New York City

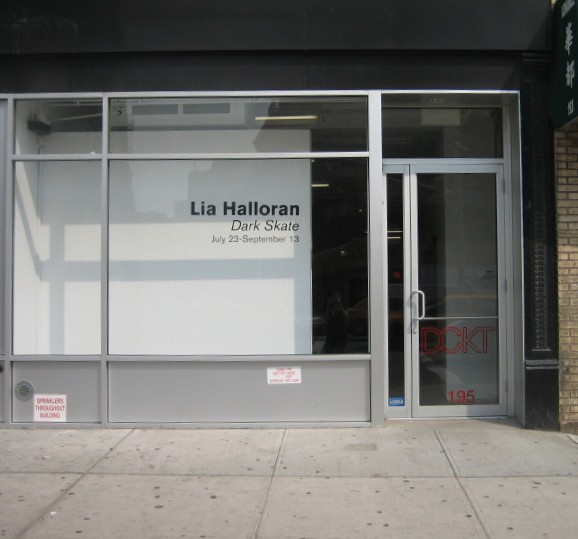
DCKT Contemporary gallery at its previous location

DCKT Contemporary was a contemporary art gallery based in New York's Lower East Side. Founded in 2002, by Dennis Christie and Ken Tyburski, the gallery closed in 2014. The gallery represented emerging and established contemporary artists working in painting and sculpture to video art and photography.

== Artists Represented ==
Some of the Artists the Gallery represented included:

- Helen Altman
- Oliver Boberg
- castaneda/reiman
- Exene Cervenka
- Sophie Crumb
- Lia Halloran
- Ryan Humphrey
- Maria E. Piñeres
- Brion Nuda Rosch
- William Swanson
- Michael Velliquette

== Locations ==
The gallery first opened in 2003 on Chelsea's West 24th Street. In March 2008, it relocated to New York City's Lower East Side, and its final location was 21 Orchard Street.
