= The Grace Museum =

Art museum in Abilene, Texas

Coordinates: 32°26′59″N 99°44′4″W

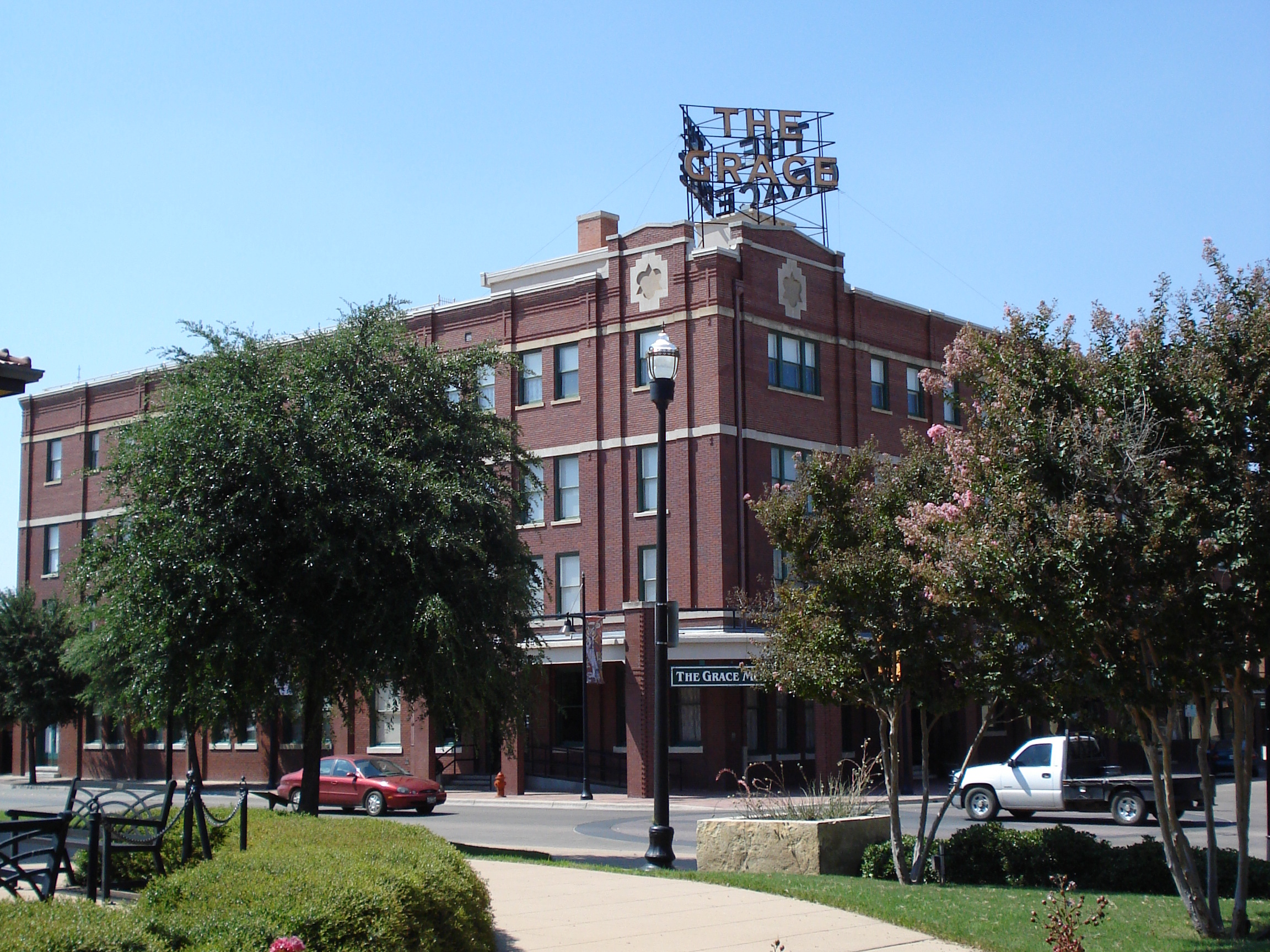
- The Grace Museum from Everman Park
- Established: 1937 as Abilene Fine Arts Museum
- Location: 102 Cypress Street; Abilene, TX 79601 United States
- Type: Art, History
- Visitors: 60,000 annually
- Director: Laura Moore
- Curator: Judy Tedford Deaton
- Website: thegracemuseum.org

The Grace Museum is located in Abilene, Texas, United States. The museum is accredited by the American Alliance of Museums (AAM). The Grace Museum houses five art galleries featuring rotating art exhibitions and artwork from the permanent collection; a history gallery with permanent and rotating exhibits featuring Abilene, Taylor County, and West Texas artifacts; an art library; an education center and an interactive gallery for children and families. The Abilene Fine Arts Museum (Abilene Museum of Fine Art) was founded in 1937 by the Art League of the Abilene Woman's Club. The art museum was housed in various downtown locations and Rose Park before the current facility was renovated in 1992. Since 1992, the museum has existed as The Museums of Abilene, Grace Cultural Center and the name was officially changed to The Grace Museum in 1998.

== Art collection ==
The permanent art collection originated with the Abilene Fine Arts Museum's first acquisitions in 1938 and has grown since its inception to over 5,000 works of art including paintings, sculptures, photographs, prints, and drawings. Recent acquisitions include artwork by James Surls, Andy Warhol, Melissa Miller, David Bates, Helen Altman, Russell Lee, Bob Stuth-Wade, Beili Liu, Vernon Fisher and others. Strengths in the art collection include the Alice and Bill Wright Photography Collection, American Depression-era Prints, the Texas Art Collection, the Clint Hamilton Collection, and artwork by contemporary American artists with Texas connections.

== History collection ==
The history collection was initiated in 1976 by the Abilene Junior League. The history collection features documents; photographs; textiles; local personal, residential, and business artifacts and memorabilia related to the history of Abilene and surrounding area dating from 1850 to 1950. Documents and photographs from The Grace History Collection can be viewed online through The Portal to Texas and the West Texas Digital Archives.

== Art exhibitions ==
The Grace Museum creates 12 unique, temporary art exhibitions annually focused on American art of the past and present with Texas connections curated from the permanent collection and/or with loans from major institutions and collectors across the state and beyond. Recent exhibitions include "Texas Modernists; Home on the Range: Where the Prairie Meets the Plains in Central West Texas"; "Beili Liu: Stratus"; "Julie Speed: Paper Cut"; "Drawn In / Drawn Out: Contemporary Drawing" and "Melissa Miller: Habitat." The museum also produces videos, exhibition publications, and catalogues to accompanying art exhibitions. Recent publications include Texas Modernists, James Surls: from the Heartland, Julie Speed: Paper Cut, Selections from the Bobbie and John Nau Collection of Texas Art and David Bates: Paintings from Texas Collections.

== History exhibitions ==
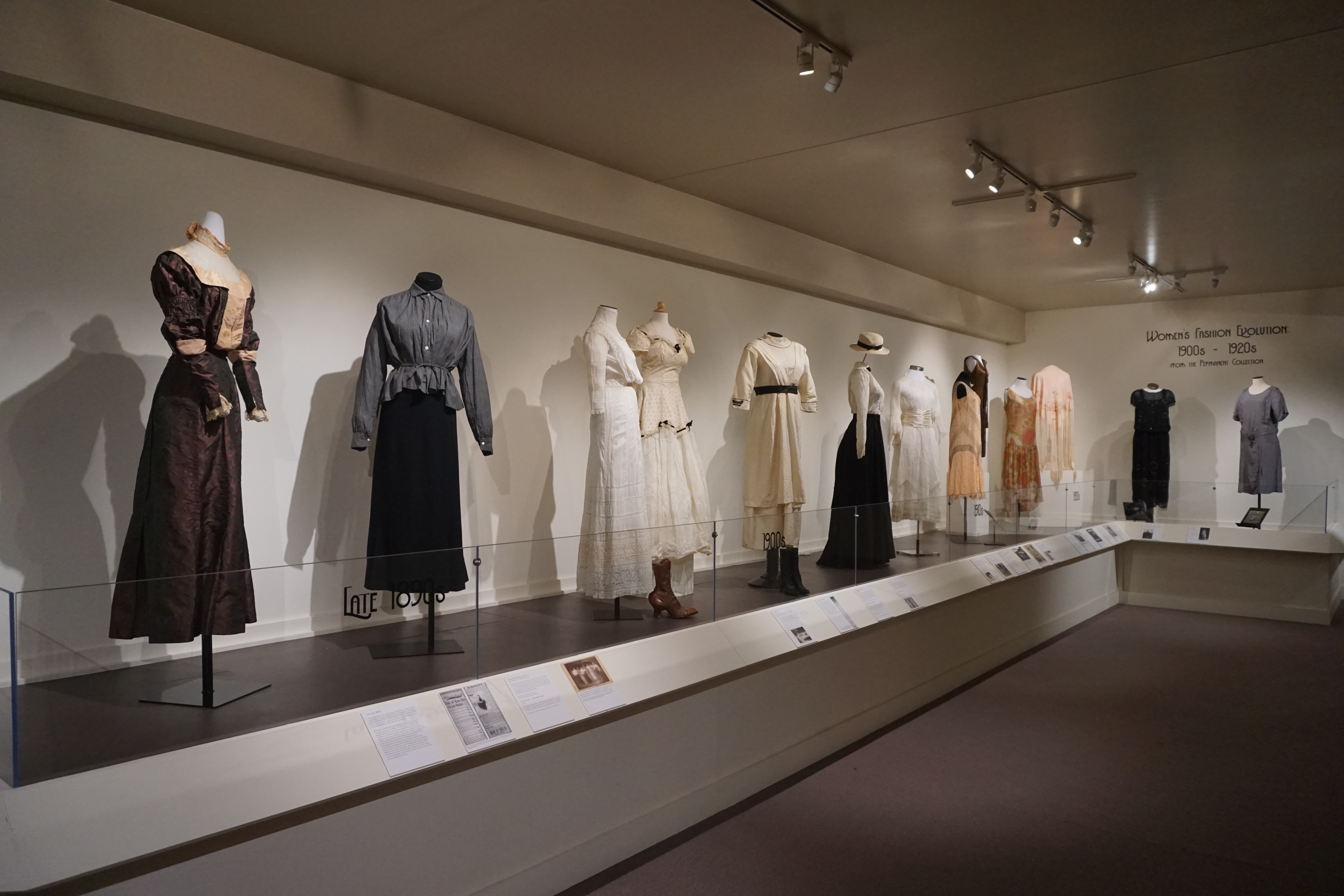
Women's Fashion Evolution: 1900s-1920s, from the Permanent Collection

The history galleries on the third-floor feature permanent exhibits of recreations of 1906, 1926, and 1946 Abilene parlors and kitchens, a 1920 Grace Hotel guestroom, and a historic bootmakers shop. Temporary exhibits of textiles, artifacts, and films on loan and from the history collection are also featured in the history galleries. Recent history exhibitions include The West Texas Clubwoman, West Texas Cattle Country and the Working Rancher and Fabulous Fifties Fashion.

== Children's gallery ==
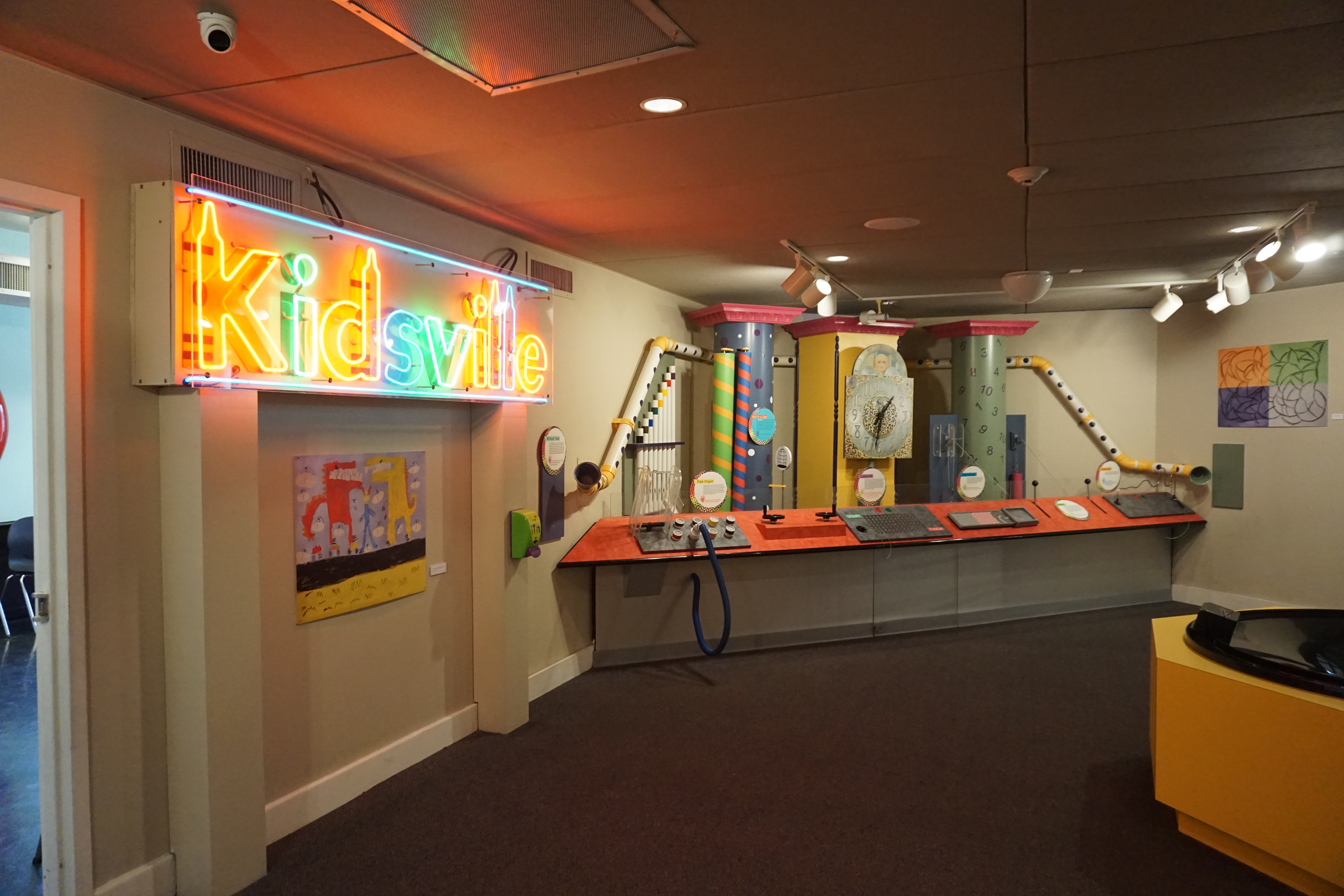
Children's gallery

The children's gallery on The Grace Museum's second floor is a hands-on discovery-based learning center for children and families. The space was renovated in 2007 and 2009. The gallery features a replica of Abilene's Paramount Theatre, an interactive sound wall, Texas tornado, life-size Operation game, children's art exhibits, a dinner, and a historic Dixie Pig Restaurant sign.

== Facility ==
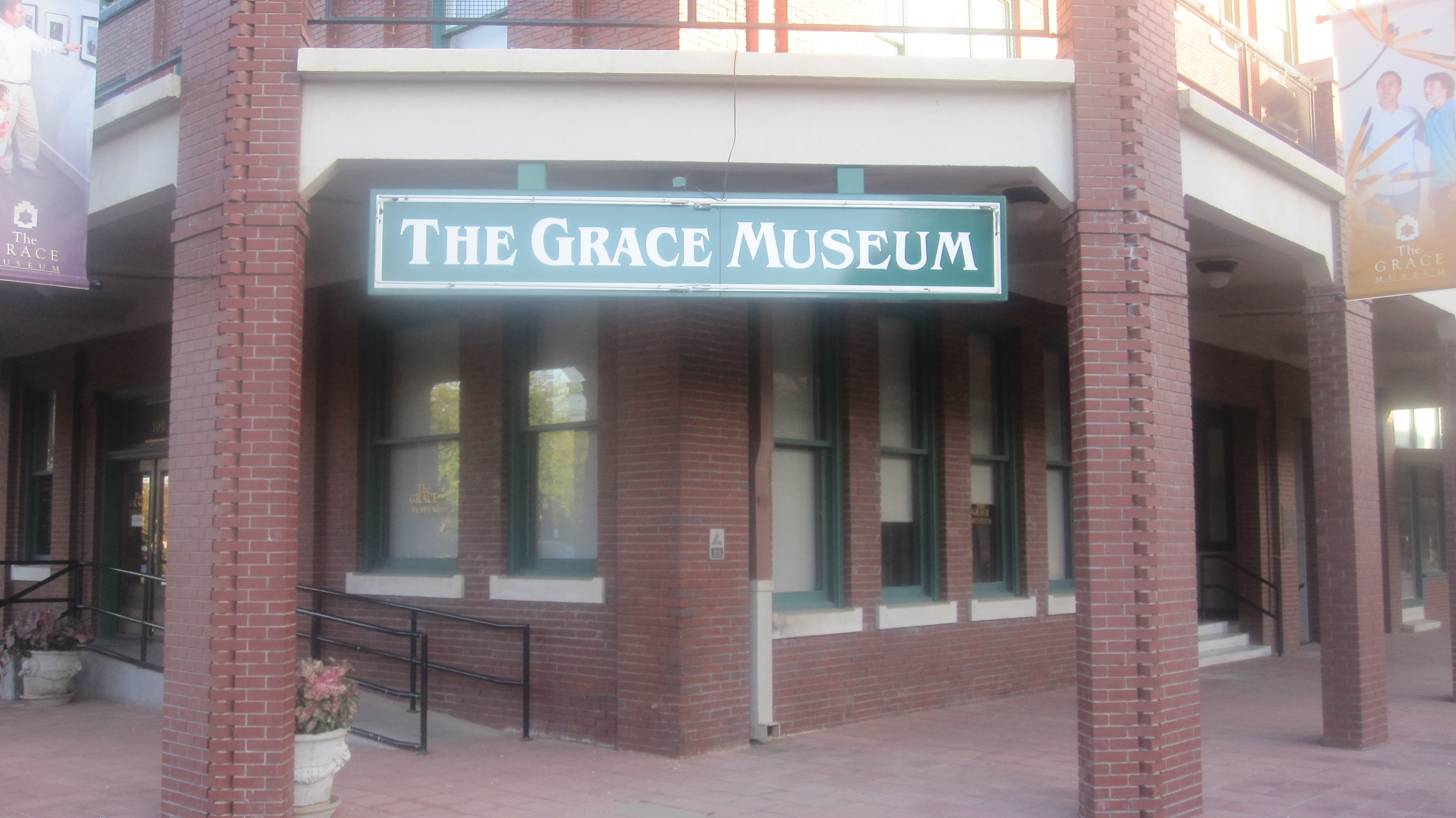
Grace Museum in former Hotel Grace in downtown Abilene.

The Grace Museum is a 55,000-square-foot (5,100 m^{2}) museum housed in the historic Hotel Grace, located in downtown Abilene, Texas. The Hotel Grace was built in 1909 by Col. W. L. Beckham of Greenville, Texas and is located at the corner of Cypress Street and North First Street. The Prairie Style Hotel Grace was initially a three-story structure, a fourth story was added in 1924. A subsequent renovation removed the main portico, bricked up several main story windows and changed the hotel's name to the Drake Hotel in 1946. The Drake Hotel eventually ceased operation in 1973 after passenger railroad traffic and subsequently downtown Abilene declined thought the 1960s. By the 1980s, the building was in disrepair and inhabited by rats and vagrants. The Abilene Preservation League and the Abilene Fine Arts Museum banded together in the late 1980s to save the neglected structure and provide a new and improved home for the Abilene Fine Arts Museum. Following major restoration in the early 1990s, the structure was placed on the National Register of Historic Places and opened to the public as the Museums of Abilene in 1992.
