= Rösch =

Rösch is a surname. Due to the diacritics, it is sometimes rendered internationally as Roesch or Rosch.

People named Rösch include:

- Angelika Rösch (born 1977), German tennis player
- Augustin Rösch (1893–1961), German Jesuit
- Bernhard Rösch (born 1963), Austrian politician
- Eberhard Rösch (born 1954), German biathlete, father of Michael
- Hans Rösch (1914–unknown), German bobsledder
- Josef Rösch (1925–2016), radiologist
- Julie Rösch (1902–1984), politician
- Michael Rösch (born 1983), German-Belgian biathlete, son of Eberhard
- Otto Rösch (1917–1995), Austrian Secretary of State
- Peter Rösch (1930–2006), Swiss football defender
- Romario Rösch (born 1999), German footballer
- Samuel Rösch (born 1994), German singer
- Ulrich Rösch (1426–1491), abbot of the Abbey of Saint Gal
- Wolfgang Rösch (born 1959), German Catholic priest, vicar general of Limburg

People named Roesch include:

- Angelika Roesch (born 1977), German tennis player
- Kurt Roesch (1905–1984), German-born American painter
