= Rosch =

Rosch is a surname. Notable people with the surname include:

- Brion Nuda Rosch (born 1976), American interactive and performance artist
- Eleanor Rosch (born 1938), American cognitive psychologist and university professor
- J. Thomas Rosch (1939–2016), American lawyer specializing in antitrust and trade regulatory laws
- Karl-Heinz Rosch (1926–1944), German soldier

== See also ==
- Rösch, a surname
