= Women and Their Work =

Non-profit art gallery in Austin, Texas

- Established: 1978
- Location: 1311 E Cesar Chavez St. Austin, Texas, U.S.
- Type: Art museum
- Website: womenandtheirwork.org

Women & Their Work is an American nonprofit visual and performing arts organization located in Austin, Texas that exhibits contemporary art created by women living and working in Texas and beyond. Since 1978, Women & Their Work has brought art to Austin with exhibitions, performances and programs.

The organization's mission is to foster growth of women visual and performing artists by encouraging them to take creative risks and make new adventurous work; to ensure that women from diverse backgrounds are equitably represented in all forms of art; and to educate a wide range of audiences about contemporary art. Since 1978, Women & Their Work has grown to present over 50 events a year featuring exhibitions and performances by Texas women artists and bringing artists of national and international stature to Texas.

== History ==
Women & Their Work was founded by artists Rita Starpattern, Deanna Stevenson, and Carol Taylor in 1977 and incorporated in 1978. In 1977, the group funded and organized Encuentro Artístico Femenil, a six-week multimedia festival centered around Hispanic and Latina women artists, and held at Juárez-Lincoln University.

By 1981, the organization had developed a "strong literary program," hosting readings by poets such as Maxine Kumin, Adrienne Rich, and May Swenson. At the time, Women & Their Work sponsored and shared offices with Black Arts Alliance.

In 1982, it was the first organization in Texas to receive a grant from the National Endowment for the Arts in visual art. In 1985, they received another grant from the NEA, amounting to $17,000. That same year, Women & Their Work, Laguna Gloria and Black Arts Alliance joined Dance Umbrella to become early members of National Performance Network.

National Public Radio featured the organization and its production, I am Annie Mae, an original play about a Black Texas woman whose grandparents were enslaved, in a six-minute segment on Morning Edition in 1987.

In 2013, Women & Their Work commissioned THIRST, a large-scale public art installation on Lady Bird Lake, which called attention to the catastrophic drought in Texas. It received international attention including features in The New York Times, The Huffington Post, The Atlantic, on a segment on Canadian public television, and on a 30-minute documentary on KLRU, Austin's PBS station. Art critic Jeanne Claire van Ryzin, then of the Austin American Statesman, cited THIRST as "setting a new standard for public art in Austin".

=== Galleries ===
Under the leadership of Chris Cowden, the director since 1986, Women & Their Work obtained its first gallery space in 1987 at 1501 West Fifth Street in Austin, thus achieving a more visible identity within the community. In 1990, the organization moved to more spacious quarters at 1137 West Sixth Street. In 1995, the organization moved again to 1710 Lavaca Street in Austin, where it remained for 25 years.

In 2020, after 42 years of renting spaces, Women & Their Work purchased a property at 1311 East Cesar Chavez Street that includes a gallery space for exhibitions, performances, and other programs; an adjacent building for education programs; and a multi-purpose outdoor courtyard.

== Exhibitions and performances ==
Women & Their Work has hosted visual artists, performers, poets and scholars among them Laurie Anderson, Coco Fusco, Ellen Fullman, the Guerrilla Girls, Deborah Hay, Maxine Kumin, Young Jean Lee, Liz Leman, Lucy Lippard, Beili Liu, Audre Lorde, Bebe Miller, Okwui Okpokwasili, Grace Paley, Howardena Pindell, Adrienne Rich, Muriel Rukeyser, Betty Saar, Margo Sawyer, Ntozake Shange, Cauleen Smith, Judith Somogi, Marcia Tucker, and Urban Bush Women.

In 1979, Women & Their Work exhibited Woman-In-Sight: New Art in Texas, the first statewide juried exhibition of women artists ever held in Texas. Marcia Tucker, former curator at the Whitney Museum of American Art and founder of the New Museum of Contemporary Art in New York was the juror of the exhibition. (Oct 27, 1979- Dec 9, 1979) The exhibition toured in seven Texas city in 1982.

A selection of Women & Their Work's exhibitions includes:

- Slouching Toward 2000: The Politics of Gender curated by Lucy Lippard (Sep. 24 - Nov. 15, 1992), reviewed in ArtForum
- Jean Behnke, Sculpture More Like Thoughts (Jul. 2 - Aug 9, 1992), reviewed in Art In America
- Adrian Piper, Political Drawings and Installations, 1975 - 1991 (Jan. 25- Feb.21, 1993)
- Betye Saar, Personal Icons (Jun. 21- Aug 10,1996)
- Regina Vater, Shellife (Apr 3 - May 10, 2003)
- Tre Arenz, One of Us: A Retrospective (Feb. 21 - May 27, 2004)
- Katie Pell, Tiny Acts of Immeasurable Benefit (August-September 13, 2008)
- Beili Liu, The Mending Project (Mar. 3 - Apr 2, 2011)
- Kelly O'Connor, Last Resort (April 2013)
- Jill Bedgood, Barnacles of Existence (March 7 - April 21, 2020)
- We Know Who We Are. We Know What We Want. curated by Vicki Meek (July 24-September 21, 2021)

In 2010, Woman & Their Work began partnering with Fusebox Festival to co-present contemporary art performances during the annual spring festival:

- 2010 - Cloud Eye Control: Under Polaris
- 2011 - Young Jean Lee Theater Company: The Shipment
- 2012 - Emily Lacy: 99 Times
- 2014 - Miya Matreyek: The Work Made Itself
- 2015 - Michelle Ellsworth: Preparation for the Obsolescence of Y Chromosome
- 2016 - Okwui Okpokwasili: Bronx Gothic
- 2017 - Wura- Natasha Ogunji: House of Wahala
- 2018 - Abby Z & The New Utility: Abandoned PIayground
- 2019 - Michelle Ellsworth: The Rehearsal Artist
- 2020 - Autumn Knight: Eating in Costume
- 2022 - Gesel Mason: Yes, And
- 2023 - Amrita Hepi: Rinse

== Education program ==
To introduce art to a broader audience, Women & Their Work began an education program in 1986 bringing Title 1 students to the gallery to see and make art. Women & Their Work has reached thousands of children who might never have visited a gallery or met working artists. The program expanded in 2011 to serve students with disabilities and formed a partnership with the GO Project, a program organized by the Austin Independent School District.

== Recognition and awards ==
Women & Their Work was named Best Art Gallery in Austin by readers of the Austin Chronicle 8 times between 2010 - 2022.

In 2020, the Smithsonian Archives of American Art acquired the 42-year (1978-2020) archive of Women & Their Work ensuring that the history of the work of women artists and Women & Their Work's website will be preserved. All 142 of its publications featuring women artists will be available in the Smithsonian Library.
