= Castaneda/reiman =

American artist duo

castaneda/reiman
- castaneda/reiman, desert landscape (collage #1), 2009, pigment print on drywall, drywall mud, wood, 18 ¼ x 25 x 1 ¾”
- Born: 1970 (age 55–56); San Francisco Bay Area, California
- Known for: Installation, mixed media
- Awards: 2004 Fleishhacker Foundation Eureka Fellowship

Charlie Castaneda (born 1970 San Diego) and Brody Reiman (born 1970 Bethlehem, Pennsylvania) are two contemporary artists who work together to form castaneda/reiman.

== Biographies ==
The artists met each other while in college at Carnegie Mellon University where they earned their BFAs in 1992. They went on to the University of California, Davis to earn their MFAs in 1994. The artists are represented by DCKT Contemporary, where they have had four solo exhibitions. They have also had exhibitions at Oakland Museum of California, Seoul Museum of Art, and Sun Valley Museum of Art.

== Solo exhibitions ==
2010

- Oakscapes and land objects, Stephen Wirtz Gallery, San Francisco, California
- DCKT Contemporary, San Francisco Fine Art Fair, San Francisco, California

2009

- Sculptures of places we’ve never been, DCKT Contemporary, New York, New York
- Places we have never been, Stephen Wirtz Gallery, San Francisco, California

2008

- Untitled (Sketch for a Landscape), DCKT Contemporary, Pulse Contemporary Art Fair, New York, New York

2006

- DCKT Contemporary, New York, New York

2003

- Floorplan landscape, DCKT Contemporary, New York, New York
- Floorplan/ New Work, Stephen Wirtz Gallery, San Francisco, California

1999

- Sandroni Rey, Venice, California

1998

- Thomas Healy Gallery, New York, New York
- Four Walls Art Space, San Francisco, California
- John Berggruen Gallery, San Francisco, California

1994

- From Here to There. Onions Included., Southern Exposure, San Francisco, California
- Master Visions of Monochromatic Fields, Basement Gallery, Davis, California

== Selected group exhibitions ==
2011

- Beneath The Picture, Bear Ridgeway Exhibitions at Ambach & Rice, Seattle, Washington

2010

- 2010 Art Practice Faculty Show, Worth Ryder Gallery, Berkeley, California
- It's My World, Baer Ridgway Exhibitions, San Francisco, California

2008

- Make the Art You Need: The UC Berkeley Department of Art Faculty Show, Worth Ryder Gallery, University of California, Berkeley, California
- Summer ’08, Stephen Wirtz Gallery, San Francisco, California

2007–08

- Artists of Invention: A Century of CCA, Oakland Museum of California, Oakland, California

2007

- CCA Centennial, Stephen Wirtz Gallery, San Francisco, California

2005

- Eureka, Berkeley Art Museum, Berkeley, California
- Welcome 2 the Jungle, DCKT Contemporary, New York, New York

2003

- Pleasure Factory, Seoul Museum of Art, Seoul, South Korea
- 101 California Street, San Francisco, California

2002

- House Broken, Rena Bransten Gallery, San Francisco, California
- Manifest Destiny and the Contemporary American Landscape, Sun Valley Center for the Arts, Sun Valley, Idaho

2001

- Sandroni Rey, Venice, California
- In Through the Outdoors, Traywick Gallery, Berkeley, California

2000

- Pierogi 2000 Flatfiles, Yerba Buena Center for the Arts, San Francisco, California
- It Can Change, Oakland, California

1999–2000

- Bay Area Now 2, Yerba Buena Center for the Arts, San Francisco, California

1999

- Charles Cowles Gallery, New York, New York
- Continuing California, San Francisco Museum of Modern Art, San Francisco, California
- Gallery for Contemporary Art, Tel Aviv, Israel
- Three Day Weekend, California College of Arts and Crafts, San Francisco, California
- Structural Elements, Transamerica Building, San Francisco, California
- Material Perception, TrizecHahn Gallery, Charlotte, North Carolina

1998

- SAP, Lanai Hotel, San Francisco, California

1997

- Structures: Buildings in American Art, John Berggruen Gallery, San Francisco, California
- The Bay Area Awards Show, New Langton Arts, San Francisco, California
- Stirred not Shaken, Refusalon, San Francisco, California
- Show Five, Gallery Oboy, San Francisco, California

1996

- Gleen, Four Walls Art Space, San Francisco, California
- Four Walls Art Space, San Francisco, California

1995

- Obsessions, Southern Exposure, San Francisco, California
- Melrose at Montavlo, Villa Montavlo Estate for the Arts, Saratoga, California

1994

- Turning the Camera on Themselves, pARTS Alternative Arts Space, Minneapolis, Minnesota
- Davis Photo Expo 1993, Davis Art Center, Davis, California
- Memorial Union Art Gallery, Davis, California

1993

- Photography Gallery, Tisch School of the Arts, New York University, NYC
- 1301 Pound Woman, Pence Gallery, Davis, California

1992

- Progetto Cuspide 1992, Associazione Promozione Iniziative Socioculturli, Pirri, Sardegna, Italy

1991

- A Time to Sing, The Ellis Gallery, Pittsburgh, Pennsylvania
- Forbes Gallery, Pittsburgh, Pennsylvania

1990

- Forbes Gallery, Pittsburgh, Pennsylvania

== Awards ==
- 2004 Fleishhacker Foundation Eureka Fellowship
- 2001–02 Affiliate Artists, Headlands Center for the Arts
- 2000 Artists in Residence, Headlands Center for the Arts
- 1999 Art Council Grant
- 1998 Bay Guardian Goldie Award, San Francisco, California
- 1997 Bay Area Awards Show, New Langton Arts, San Francisco, California
- 1995 Artists in Residence, Villa Montavlo, Saratoga, California
- 1994 Artists in Residence, Southern Exposure, San Francisco, California
- 1993 National Graduate Fellows, American Photography Institute, New York University, New York, New York
- 1992 Artists in Residence, Associazione Promozione Iniziative Socioculturli, Pirri, Sardegna, Italy

== Collections ==
- San Francisco Museum of Modern Art, San Francisco, California

== Teaching ==
- 2007–present University of California, Berkeley, assistant professor of sculpture (Reiman)
- 2001–present San Francisco Art Institute, visiting artist (Castaneda)
- 2001–07 California College of Arts and Crafts, adjunct professors
- 2000 University of California, Berkeley, visiting lecturers
- 1999 Carnegie Mellon University, visiting artists
