= Jun Ke Choy =

Jun Ke Choy (Chinese: 蔡增基; pinyin: Cài Zēngjī; Wade–Giles: Tsai Tseng-chi; 1892 – July 9, 1981) was a Chinese American politician who served as mayor of Hangzhou and the 14th chairman of the China Merchants Steamship Company Group, now known as China Merchants Group. He was also the founder of the Chinese Culture Center in San Francisco. Choy is commonly known as J.K. Choy.

== Biography ==
Choy was born in Honolulu in 1892 and studied at McKinley High School from 1908 to 1911. As a young man, he met Sun Yat-sen and was resolved to return to China. In 1911, he returned to Guangdong, his native province and was elected a member of the Provincial Assembly. However, finding politics uninteresting, Choy returned to the United States and enrolled in Columbia University as a Chinese government student. He graduated from Columbia College in 1915. During his time at Columbia, he was the president of the Chinese Students Club and was critical of Japanese interference in Chinese politics.

In 1915, Choy again returned to China. He was made a member of the Liangkwang Military Headquarters. The following year he was given the appointment of Director of Foreign Affairs of the Nationalist Government in Guangdong. Shortly afterwards, he resigned to enter the business world.

During his visit to Beijing in 1915, he was appointed assistant editor of the Peking Post around the time when Yuan Shikai was trying to make himself Emperor of China. Choy resigned from the "Post" and left Beijing for the South, as he was against the monarchical movement. Subsequently, he became vice-president of the Industrial and Commercial Bank of Hong Kong.

In 1918, Choy raised money for the establishment of branch offices of the Bank at Hankou and Tianjin. He secured over fifty thousand dollars' worth of subscriptions to the total capitalization of the branch banks.

On February 25, 1921, Choy was named commissioner of Finance and Commissioner of Land in City Government of Canton. He then served as director of the administrative department of Ministry of Railways of the Nationalist Government in 1926. In 1927 he was made director-General of Railways of the Ministry of Communications. He was made currency controller of the Ministry of Finance on November 1, 1927. In 1928, he became managing-director of the Shanghai-Nanking and Shanghai Ningpo-Hangchow Railways.

In 1930, he was named mayor of Hangzhou. In 1931, he became commissioner of Finance, and concurrently Commissioner of Land, City Government of Greater Shanghai. He was also a liaison officer between the mayor's office and the British and American Consulates.

In 1936, he was named Chairman of the China Merchants Steamship Company Group and headed its operations during World War II, when he relocated to Hong Kong after the Japanese invasion of Shanghai. He resigned on March 1, 1943.

Upon returning to the United States, Choy was named an overseas delegate of the Chinese Democratic Constitutionalist Party after being dissatisfied with both the Kuomintang and the Chinese Communist Party.

Choy organized the first San Francisco Federal Savings & Loan Association branch in Chinatown. He lobbied, and help found the Chinese Culture Center in Chinatown, San Francisco in 1965.

Choy died in San Francisco on July 9, 1981.
