= Ryan Humphrey (artist) =

American artist (born 1971)

- Born: 1971 (age 54–55); Ashtabula, Ohio, US
- Education: MFA, Hunter College, New York 1999; Skowhegan School of Painting and Sculpture, Maine, 2001; Whitney Museum of American Art Independent Study Program, NY, 2005-2006
- Known for: Mixed Media, Video Art

Ryan Humphrey (born 1971) is an American artist who currently lives and works in New York City. His work has been featured in the traveling exhibition Will Boys Be Boys? curated by Shamim Momin of the Whitney Museum of American Art. Humphrey's most recent solo exhibition, All of Nothing, was at DCKT Contemporary. Humphrey was also a contestant in Season I of Top Design, Bravo's reality show.

Recently, Humphrey was included in the Queens International 4 exhibition at the Queens Museum of Art. His large-scale installation, titled Fast Forward (2009), included BMX ramps adjacent to a wall-to-ceiling collection of trophies and customized BMX bikes, and he continued this theme in his installation Look for the dream that keeps coming back (2010) at Kunsthalle Galapagos. Humphrey expresses his growing up in BMX culture through his art. The assemblage also included several paintings, created by the artist for the exhibition, and several sculptures of BMX bike wheels. The paintings were small drips that recall the works of Jackson Pollock, and the BMX sculptures are similar to Marcel Duchamp's Bicycle Wheel. The installation included an opening night performance by legendary BMX pro Dizz Hicks and Ryan Humphrey on the ramps. An edition of 20 silkscreen posters was made by the artist, and signed by himself and Dizz Hicks, to commemorate the event.
