= Stella Zhang =

Chinese contemporary artist

Stella Zhang (Chinese: 张爽; born 1965 in Beijing, China) is a Chinese contemporary artist whose practice ranges from painting to sculpture and installation. Zhang is notable for her strong feminist approach in art-making. Her work is described as "a statement for women’s power and identity," Zhang is exhibited world-wide and collected by public institutions such as the National Art Museum of China, Beijing, China, Copelouzos Family Art Museum, Athens, Greece; and Tan Shin Fine Arts Museum, Tokyo, Japan. There are seven monographs focusing on her work, published by Chinese Culture Foundation of San Francisco, Si Chuan Art Press, EDGE Gallery, JKD Gallery, and Galerie du Monde. She is a guest lecturer at Stanford University and also teaches at the Central Academy of Fine Arts in Beijing.

== Education ==
Zhang was trained in the Chinese Brush Painting Department at Central Academy of Fine Arts in Beijing. In 1990, she moved to Japan and obtained a Master’s degree in Fine Arts from Tokyo University of the Arts in 1996. She currently lives and works in San Francisco, USA.

== Work ==
Stella Zhang translates forms and textures of female and male bodies by utilizing soft yet resilient materials such as threads and fabrics. American art historian and curator Betti-Sue Hertz comments that these materials become "emblems of power and desire." Zhang uses other daily objects to depict the tension between what a spectator sees and his/her/their feelings, tenderness, and flexibility, as well as the space between reality and dream. In the artist's own words, her art "expresses hidden conflicts that challenge our ability to connect to our shared struggles with power; inequality and identity."

== Solo exhibitions ==
Stella Zhang's solo exhibitions include Qualia Contemporary Art, Palo Alto, USA (2021); UNTITLED, ART, presented by Chinese Culture Center of San Francisco, San Francisco, USA (2020); Galerie du Monde, Hong Kong (2018); Wanying Art Museum, Hebei, China (2018); NanHai Art, Millbrae, USA (2017); Art Basel in Hong Kong, presented by Galerie du Monde, Hong Kong (2016); Art Central, presented by Galerie du Monde, Hong Kong (2015); Galerie du Monde, Hong Kong (2015); EDGE Gallery, Hong Kong (2012); Silicon Valley Asian Art Center, Santa Clara, USA (2011); The Performance Art Institute, San Francisco, USA; Chinese Culture Center of San Francisco, San Francisco, USA (2010); Amrithika Gallery, Palo Alto, USA (2009); Elizabeth Norton Gallery, Palo Alto, USA (2009); JKD Gallery, Santa Monica, USA (2006); Sandstone Gallery, Laguna Beach, USA (2005); National Art Museum of China, Beijing, China; New Taipei City Arts Center, Taipei, Taiwan (2004); JKD Gallery, Santa Monica, USA (2003); Journal Gallery, Tokyo, Japan (1997); Ozuwashi Museum, Tokyo, Japan (1993); Nagai Gallery, Tokyo, Japan (1992); and Chinese Gallery, Yokohama, Japan (1991).

== Group exhibitions ==
Zhang has exhibited her work in many group exhibitions at arts organizations, museums, and galleries. These include Art Miami, presented by Nanhai Art, Miami, USA (2019); NanHai Art, Millbrae, USA (2019); Galerie du Monde, Hong Kong (2019); NanHai Art, Millbrae, USA (2019); Chinese Culture Center of San Francisco, San Francisco, USA (2019); Zero Art Center, 798 Art Zone, Beijing, China (2019); State of California Building, San Francisco, USA (2019); Chinese Culture Center of San Francisco, San Francisco, USA (2018); ART170, Hangzhou, China (2018); Guangzhou Design Week, Guangzhou, China (2019); Art Market San Francisco, San Francisco, USA (2017); Artist Biography As of January 2020 (2017); Berkeley Art Center, Berkeley, USA (2017); San Francisco Arts Commission Gallery, San Francisco, USA (2017); Walter Maciel Gallery, Los Angeles, USA (2017); Shenzhen Fine Art Institute, Shenzhen, China (2016); Art Taipei, presented by Galerie du Monde, Taipei, Taiwan (2015); ArtInternational Istanbul, presented by Galerie du Monde, Istanbul, Turkey (2015); Arc Gallery, Chicago, USA (2015); Silicon Valley Asian Art Center, Santa Clara, USA (2014); Urban Studio, Miami, USA (2013); SOMArts, San Francisco, USA (2013); Hilton Orange County, Costa Mesa, USA (2013); Guangdong Museum of Art, Guangdong, China (2013); Stanford Art Spaces, Stanford University, Stanford, USA (2012); Chinese Culture Center of San Francisco, San Francisco, USA (2012); ARENA 1 Gallery, Santa Monica, USA (2012); EMG Shanghai, Shanghai, China (2011); Stanford Art Spaces, Stanford University, Stanford, USA (2011); Yerba Buena Center for the Arts, San Francisco, USA (2011); China Institute Gallery, New York, USA (2011); A.I.R. Gallery, New York, USA (2010); Alameda Museum, Alameda, USA (2010); Central Academy of Fine Arts Art Museum, Beijing, China (2010); Beijing World Art Museum, Beijing, China (2008); Kuandu Museum of Fine Arts, Taipei, Taiwan (2007); 28th Spring Souga Exhibition, Tokyo, Japan (2002); Matsuzakaya Gallery, Tokyo, Japan (2001); Matsuzakaya Gallery, Tokyo, Japan (2000); Tobu Gallery, Funabashi, Japan (1999); Matsuzakaya Gallery, Tokyo, Japan (1998); Onward Gallery, Tokyo, Japan (1996); and Central Academy of Fine Arts Museum, Beijing, China (1989).
