= Helen Altman =

American artist

Helen Altman (born 1958, in Tuscaloosa, Alabama, United States) is an artist based in Fort Worth, Texas. Altman received both her BFA, in 1981, and MA, in 1986, from the University of Alabama, Tuscaloosa. In 1989 she earned her MFA from the University of North Texas, Denton in 1989.

== Work ==
Altman's earlier works include sculptures made from household appliances, and use humor to draw attention to more serious themes. For example, Weeping Iron is a leaking iron encased within a laundry basket resting upon an ironing board which is smothered by men's dress shirts. The absurdity of a crying iron is only the first layer of meaning, the second relating to a woman trapped under the weight of household duties.

Altman's work includes quilted moving blankets imprinted with found images of nature. Through these works Altman juxtaposes nature with artificiality; her subjects are innate while the materials and means of creating the work are synthetic. Altman also creates birds made from wire whose exoskeletons encompass various found objects.

Altman's "torch" drawings of animals range in subject matter from exotic animals to household pets. She created these drawings by first soaking paper in water and then carefully burning an image into the surface with a propane torch. This process leaves little room for error as the surface must remain wet otherwise it will ignite; there is no re-torching. The end result is an image that floats in the center of the page with varying hues of brown fading into the paper like a mirage.

In a 2009 solo exhibition at DCKT Contemporary, Altman displayed Goldfish, a 45-gallon aquarium filled with dozens of cast plastic goldfish weighed down individually by fishing weights. Apart from the recurring theme of natural subjects represented by artificial means, Altman is also questioning individuality, loneliness and loss of identity.

Altman attempted to take fear out of death in the exhibit "Dead or Alive" at the Museum of Arts and Design in New York. She used several types of herbs and other natural foodstuffs ranging from juniper berry to lavender to yellow mustard seed to cast human skull sculptures. Altman intended for the viewer to approach the skulls and be captivated by their fragrance instead of repulsed by their association with death. "It's like the traditional sugar skulls you see in Mexico for Day of the Dead," she said. "You make death into a sweet thing to be eaten so that people don't fear it."

== Exhibitions ==
=== Permanent collections ===
- Art Museum of Southeast Texas, Beaumont, Texas
- Dallas Museum of Art, Dallas, Texas
- Museum of Contemporary Art, San Diego, California
- Museum of Fine Arts, Houston, Texas
- Sarah Moody Gallery of Art, University of Alabama, Tuscaloosa, Alabama.

=== Solo exhibitions ===
- Art Museum of Southeast Texas, Beaumont, Texas
- DCKT Contemporary, New York City, New York
- The Grace Museum, Abilene, Texas
- Dunn and Brown Contemporary, Dallas, Texas
- The Glassell School of Art, Museum of Fine Arts, Houston, Texas
- Barry Whistler Gallery, Dallas, Texas
- Carrie Secrist Gallery, Chicago
- Moody Gallery, Houston, Texas
- Museum of Contemporary Art, San Diego

=== Group exhibitions ===
- Dead or Alive: Nature Revisited, Museum of Arts and Design, New York, New York
- Texas Vision: The Barrett Collection, The Meadows Museum, Southern Methodist University, Dallas, Texas
- Flock & Fable- Animals and Identity in Contemporary Art, Chelsea Art Museum, New York, New York
- The Inward Eye: Transcendence in Contemporary Art, Contemporary Arts Museum, Houston, Texas
- Burn: Artists Play with Fire, Norton Museum of Art, West Palm Beach, Florida; The Columbia Museum of Art, Columbus South Carolina
- Natural Deceits, Modern Art Museum of Fort Worth, Fort Worth, Texas
