= Lia Halloran =

American artist

- Born: 1977 (age 48–49); Chicago, Illinois, US
- Education: MFA, Yale University, 2001
- Known for: Photography, Painting
- Awards: Schoelkopf Travel Grant, Yale University; ARC Grant, Durfee Foundation; Wang-Fradkin Professorship, Chapman University; National Endowment for the Arts, Art Works for Visual Arts Funding
- Website: http://www.liahalloran.com

Lia Halloran (born 1977) is an American painter and photographer who lives and works in Los Angeles.

== Life and education ==
Born in Chicago, IL., Lia Halloran grew up in the San Francisco Bay Area town of Pacifica, CA. Her youth was spent skateboarding and surfing, first given a skateboard at the age of five, and at the age of 15 was featured in Thrasher magazine. She developed an early love for science during high school at her first job, where she performed cow eye dissections and laser demonstrations at the Exploratorium in San Francisco. Her love for skateboarding, surfing, and science would later play an important role in her own understanding of art and creativity.

Halloran's formal education began at UCLA, where she received a BFA in 1999, and then Yale, where she received a MFA in Painting in Printmaking in 2001.

Halloran lives and works in Los Angeles, CA, and currently serves as Associate Professor of Art and Director of the Painting and Drawing Department at Chapman University in Orange, CA. She teaches painting, as well as courses she personally designed that explore the intersection of art and science. With an interdisciplinary approach towards her own work, an understanding of science provides a curious nature crucial to an artistic mind. One for adventure, Halloran's hobbies include flying planes.

== Work ==
Halloran's studio practice is in constant dialogue between art and science. Originating through scientific concepts, her works interweave ideas of the natural world with those of physicality, sexuality, intimacy and movement. Her projects blend these ideas with that of mapping the physics of motion, as seen in The World Is Bound In Secret Knots and Dark Skate, or perception, scale, and giant crystal caves, as seen in The Only Way Out Is Through, or cabinets of curiosities and taxonomy, as seen in Wonder Room, or the periodic table of elements, as seen in Sublimation/Transmutation.

Halloran has been involved in several collaborative projects, including co-curating exhibitions, one with artist Rebecca Campbell titled, Better Far Pursue A Frivolous Trade By Serious Means, Than A Sublime Art Frivolously, and another exhibition about the nature of scale with physicist Dr. Lisa Randall, titled Measure for Measure. Additionally, she is currently working a book with physicist Kip Thorne, which will include Halloran's paintings and Kip's prose about the warped side of the universe.

Halloran's work has been featured in numerous publications, including The Los Angeles Times, The New York Times, The New Yorker, New York Magazine, The Boston Globe, and ArtNews. She has had solo exhibitions at the DCKT Contemporary (New York, NY), Martha Otero Gallery (Los Angeles, CA), Hilger NEXT (Vienna, Austria), Fredric Snitzer Gallery (Miami, FL), LaMontagne Gallery (Boston, MA) and Sandroni Rey (Los Angeles, CA). Her work has been acquired by the Solomon R. Guggenheim Museum (New York, NY), The Speyer Family Collection (New York, NY), the Art Museum of South Texas (Corpus Christi, TX), and The Progressive Art Collection (Cleveland, OH).

=== The World Is Bound In Secret Knots ===
Halloran's series, The World Is Bound in Secret Knots (2005, acrylic and oil on panel), explores "physical forces of nature and the possibilities of how these forces interact with, intersect and fragment the body." The paintings are "two-dimensional visualizations of the experience of space flight, often showing female astronauts floating in space or engaged in some other gravity-defying activity." This series was first shown in 2006 at DCKT Contemporary in New York.

=== The Wonder Room ===
Halloran's The Wonder Room (2014) includes over 30 works based on specimens in the oldest science museum in Europe, La Specola. "The result is an image strange in nature because it is not entirely drawing, nor entirely a photograph either." Wunderkammer, translated as "wonder rooms," were the precursors to cabinets of curiosities, "which contained collections of objects, minerals, and taxidermy animals of the natural world which science had yet to categorize." These works based on the curiosities in La Specola started as "negative paintings" and were subsequently contact-printed in the darkroom to create the final artwork. The Wonder Room was shown at SACI's gallery in Florence, Italy in 2014.

=== Sublimation/Transmutation ===
Halloran's Sublimation/Transmutation (2011-2012, ink on drafting film) was shown at DCKT Contemporary 2011-2012 and later at Martha Otero Gallery in Los Angeles. These large-scale works "feature Halloran's unusual technique of laying ink on drafting film; the human form and the passage of time is simultaneously considered, where the organic body experiences a sublimation into the realm of the inanimate... Referencing rocks and crystals collected in Halloran's studio, the artist coerces the controlled movement of the ink from solution into solid." As a part of this series, Halloran created a reincarnation of the Periodic Table of Elements consisting of 118 paintings, titled Elements (2016, ink on drafting film), which "incorporates a synthesis of figures with minerals and crystalline forms." This incarnation of the Periodic Table of Elements re-interprets the historic grid and combines queer female figures, photographed by Halloran in Los Angeles over a period of 2 years, into various chemical states of the 118 elements.

=== Dark Skate ===
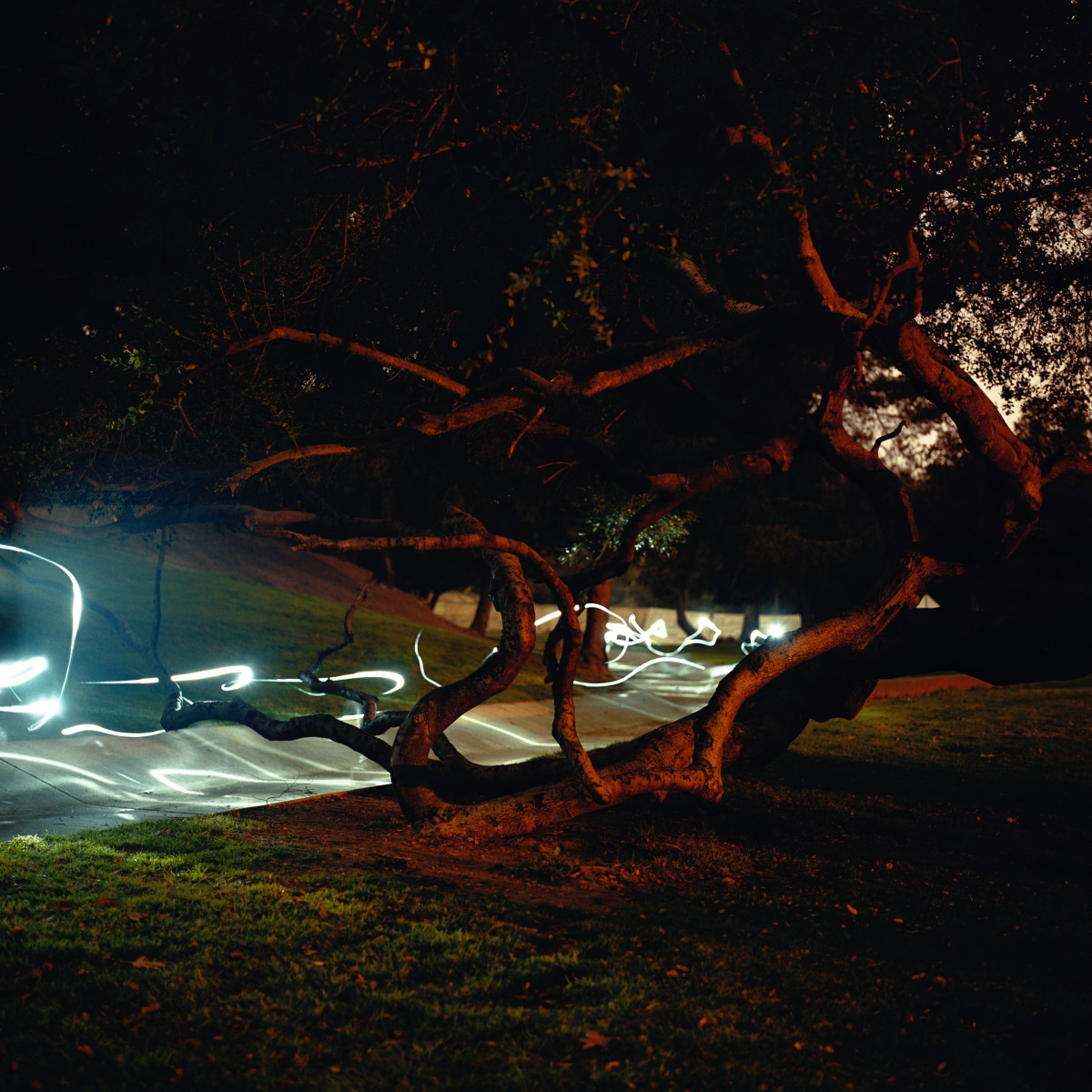
Griffith Park (2007, c-print), permanent collection Solomon R. Guggenheim Museum, New York

The haunting photographic series, Dark Skate (2008–present, c-prints), comments on the nature of physical being and spiritual essence in a contemporary world. Beginning in 2007, the ongoing series has been shot in the hidden and gritty architecture of various cities, including Los Angeles, Detroit, Miami, and Vienna.

The photos illustrate an after-image of Halloran's performance, as she rides a skateboard with a light-source attached to her body. The long exposure time of the photographs, upwards of forty minutes, captures a light-drawing of motion but not the artist herself. Dark Skate can be understood as a series of self-portraits, while her physicality is not depicted, her essence illuminates the urban scenes. Like the individual photos trace a course of action, the entire series traces back Halloran's own biography: paying homage to her youth as a female skateboarder and surfer, and how it has merged with her own understanding and study of astrophysics. These experiences taught Halloran the meaning of a body in space, and how to trace her own path as she travels through the dark.

While biographical, the series speaks of humanity on a much larger scale, specifically the human experience and interaction within the modern phenomenon of a concrete jungle. As infrastructure and industrialization replace the natural environment, the human spirit seems to have lost an intimate connection to its surroundings. The actual labor and process of Dark Skate addresses this modern disconnect and humanizes the physical experience of living in the urban world.

This work has had solo exhibitions at DCKT Contemporary in New York, LaMontagne Gallery in Boston, MA, Fredric Snitzer Gallery in Miami, FL, Ernst Hilger Gallery in Vienna, Austria, and Pulse, London, England. The piece, Griffith Park (2007), was included in the exhibition, Haunted: Contemporary Photography, Video and Performance at the Guggenheim in Bilbao, Spain, and is now in the permanent collection of the Solomon R. Guggenheim Museum. This series was reviewed in The New York Times, New York Magazine, The New Yorker, LA Weekly, The Boston Globe, Time Out New York, and Artillery Magazine.

=== Deep Sky Companion ===
Halloran's series, Deep Sky Companion (2013, cliché-verre prints), is a permanent installation of 110 circular works at The Cahill Center for Astronomy and Astrophysics, at Caltech in Pasadena, CA. This series delves deep into the universe to explore the mystery between the known and unknown. Her collection references the scientific discoveries of deep sky objects, classified and catalogued by French astronomer, Charles Messier (1730–1817). As Messier translated his observations into reproductions, Halloran illustrates her own response to the 110 astronomical findings. While in a simpler pursuit of comets, Messier's unexpected observations were far greater, discovering whole galaxies and interstellar nebulae. In a similarly exploratory fashion, Halloran's procedure is largely a matter of chance, as the inks and prints are whim to natural and chemical processes. While entirely calculated, Halloran's works channel a similar uncertainty Messier faced. She reinterprets Messier's personal experience, enlivening a mystery and wonder that is often lost to scientific frustrations. Deep Sky Companion does not dwell in the unknown but is energized by the fascinations of mystery. Halloran collaborated with architect David Ross to create the perfect physical and structural layout for the exhibition. The 110 photographic works climb upwards through three stories of architect Thom Mayne's unique building of slanted ceilings and extreme planes, forcing viewers to mimic the physical experience of astronomers observing objects in deep space.

=== Your Body is a Space That Sees ===
In the series, Your Body is a Space That Sees (2016-2017, cyanotype print), Halloran continues the theme of exploring scientific classification systems by re-investigating the timeline of discovery to unearth influential women who contributed to the foundations of modern astronomy. This large-scale series of cyanotypes is dedicated to the discoveries these women participated in, the impact on the field of which is often overlooked.

This group of women, known as the “Harvard Computers,” classified the brightness, size, and chemical composition of stars. In partnership with the Harvard University Archive, Halloran's work references the photographic plates used by these women to catalogue their research. With the support of an Art Works Grant from the National Endowment of the Arts in partnership with Chapman University, Halloran was able to conduct extensive research on these women, in order to create astonishing images of the night sky.

The cyanotypes are created through a scientific and experimental process, by painting the images on semitransparent drafting film. Next, they are pressed on paper glazed with light-sensitive emulsion and exposed to the sun, creating a positive image. This process mimics that of the Harvard Computer's astronomical plates, essentially creating a photographic print without the use of a camera. Stepping away from the often-formulaic process of science, Halloran's pieces do not dwell in accuracy, but instead offers an active experience, re-igniting the spirit of the universe.

Your Body Is a Space That Sees has been shown in multiple exhibitions at institutions including Luis De Jesus Los Angeles, LUX Institute, Schneider Museum of Art in Ashland, Oregon, University of Maryland, Santa Barbara Museum of Art, and also in two large-scale exhibitions in Terminal 1 and Terminal 3 at LAX as part of an invitation from a partnership between LAWA and the City of Los Angeles Department of Cultural Affairs. This work has been reviewed in The Washington Post, The Los Angeles Times, The San Diego Tribune, Diamondback News, and Space.com.

=== Double Horizon ===
Halloran's first video installation, Double Horizon (2019), features a 3-channel piece with footage of Halloran exploring Los Angeles from the sky, filmed by attaching cameras to a small Cessna plane while she was learning to fly. Exploring the city around her is an extension of her photographic series Dark Skate. "Her ongoing investigations into the personal, physical, psychological, and scientific exploration of space are the primary focus of these new works as the viewer encounters Halloran both skateboarding the vast urban landscape of Los Angeles and flying above and around its dynamic terrain." "The journey of 'Double Horizon' is one guided by the artist herself, as the piece acts both as a video portrait of Halloran’s flight experience and as an homage to Los Angeles."

This piece has been shown at Luis De Jesus Los Angeles, Art Center's Mullins Gallery, The University of Maryland, and The Exploratorium in San Francisco. Halloran gave an interview about this work in Flaunt magazine.

=== Solar ===
Commissioned by the Simons Foundation, Halloran’s 10-foot x 11-foot painted cyanotype, Solar, is installed at the Flatiron Institute Center for Computational Astrophysics in New York. Solar's large-scale cyanotypes and their painted negatives pay homage to the sun. Additional works also a part of the Solar series were featured in the 2021 The Sun Burns My Eyes Like Moons installation at Luis De Jesus Los Angeles: "Cyanotypes are created by exposing paper coated with photo-reactive chemicals directly to sunlight; but in Halloran’s work, capturing the rays of the sun as a material in her technique is only one aspect — the imagery and symbolism present in the compositions is furthermore about rendering the sun itself. Her images derivative of the symmetrical progressions of solar eclipses were made by harnessing the sun’s own rays, so that what results is both a direct dynamic embodiment and an affecting allegorical narrative at the same time."

== Publications ==
=== The Warped Side of the Universe ===
Over a period of over 13 years, Lia Halloran and Nobel Laureate Kip Thorne collaborated on creating a book of poetry and paintings titled The Warped Side of the Universe, for which Lia Halloran created nearly 500 individual paintings, approximately 100 of which are featured in the final publication (October 2023, Norton/ Liveright). The Warped Side of the Universe, featuring Thorne's poetry alongside Halloran's paintings, doubles as a vehicle for communicating major scientific breakthroughs of our time to a wide audience.

== Recognition ==
As an artist who often incorporates science and nature to create projects that draw from scientific materials, historical influences, and identities, Lia Halloran has participated in a wide range of interdisciplinary collaborations with scientists and architects, including an upcoming book with Nobel Laureate Kip Thorne about the ‘Warped Side of the Universe.’ Her work has been exhibited in galleries and museums nationally and internationally, and she is the recipient of various awards including an Art Works Grant from the National Endowment of the Arts, The City of Los Angeles Visual Artist Fellowship, a residency at Caltech and the Huntington Research Institute, a residency at Pioneer Works in Brooklyn, NY, and a residency at the American Natural History Museum Astrophysics Department in New York, among others. Her work is included in various permanent collections including the Solomon R. Guggenheim Museum, New York, and permanent installations at the Simons Foundation in New York and the Cahill Center for Astronomy and Astrophysics at Caltech in Pasadena, CA.
