= Michael Velliquette =

American artist

Michael Velliquette is an American collage artist.

== Education ==
Velliquette received his BFA from Florida State University in Tallahassee, Florida, in 1993 and his MFA from the University of Wisconsin in 2000. He works and lives in Madison, Wisconsin.

== Works ==
Velliquette began his career with hanging mobiles created from felt, Xerox prints, puffy paint, stickers and colored string. The pieces were composed of silhouettes of Velliquette’s profile.

Velliquette created an installation for the show "the ü in the i" at ArtPlace in Austin, Texas, which transformed the gallery into a dream world reminiscent of a children’s TV show set. The installation included a bridge that appears to rise out of the water, two enormous hands that play a game of Cat’s Cradle, and a small hut made from cardboard.

After his large installation pieces, Velliquette focused on making smaller scale paper collages. Although these works were two-dimensional, they still included his rainbow palette and his love of camp. These collages are extremely intricate and contain several layers of cut paper with jagged edges. His 2007 exhibition, The Intuitive Jungle, included 12 scenes with beastly creatures that represent elements of the human consciousness like fear, wisdom or rage.

Velliquette’s three-dimensional paper collages focus on objects that possess devotional characteristics and reference totems, stupas and altars. Power Tower, for example, is strongly vertical and creates imagery reminiscent of ritualistic icons. He has also worked on what he calls his “Inner Beasts” which are inspired by mythological creatures and represent his own state of mind.

Velliquette continues to explore ornamental abstraction through his collages and drawings. In these works he uses hand-painted heavyweight paper which creates an intense color palette and contrast between the brushstrokes and the sharp edges of the cut paper. Velliquette has been influenced by the practice of stigilization, a method for developing symbols by which a word of intent is translated into a formal design. For example, Good Ciphers 1-12 includes handwritten lines like “Opening to a deeper sense of self” which incorporate gestural rune-like symbols made from the letters of the statement.

He has exhibited at DCKT Contemporary in New York (2007, 2009). Velliquette was also included in group exhibitions "New American Talent - 21st Exhibition" (2006) at the Jones Center for Contemporary Art in Austin, Texas, and "We Are Electric" (2003) at Deitch Projects in New York. Along with Leslee Fraser and artist Joey Fauerso, he opened the Bower artspace in San Antonio, Texas in 2002. After three successful years of exhibitions and programs, the space went on hiatus.
