= Brion Nuda Rosch =

American artist (born 1976)

Brion Nuda Rosch (born 1976, Chicago, Illinois, United States) is an American visual artist. He is based in San Francisco, California.

== Work ==
Rosch initially gained recognition with his work in performance art. In the 2005 exhibition, Form/Reform, at Oakland Art Gallery Rosch created a carnival vase-breaking game which invited viewers to throw sock balls at a pyramid of ceramic vases causing the objects to fall and shatter. Rosch's work aimed to entertain, a characteristic of Bay area performance art. He was successful in creating art that resonated beyond the initial performance because the remnants of the broken vases left an interesting visual component.

Rosch is concerned with developing relationships between his audience and his work. In the 2007 exhibit at Southern Exposure in San Francisco, Rosch invited visitors to create artwork from the materials he provided with suggested ideas including: make a face using three parts, make a still life of some of your best memories as if spread across the table, make a totem for all past present and future.

Along with his work in performance and interactive art, Rosch works in two-dimensional forms creating collages. He begins with found objects, magazine spreads, and photographs he complicates adding other images or blocks of color. An example of this is Untitled (River Canyon, Country Countryscape) in which Rosch used a color photograph of a mountain range and placed the image on a black and white photograph of a different mountain range, however he lined up the images so the ridge of one mountain range flows into the other.

Rosch's recent work continues to use found photographs and prints of landscapes with cut brown or turquoise paper rectangles placed on the image. These works create a stark contrast between the cut paper and the images beneath and are reminiscent of modern sculpture parks. ” Rosch uses turquoise as a “symbol of escape”. Alongside these collages Rosch displays sculptures of small found statuettes covered in plaster and painted either turquoise or brown. In 2010 DCKT Contemporary exhibit, Rosch displayed four turquoise sculptures featuring conjoined boards that mimic architectural aspects of the space.

Art history also continues to be a concern for Rosch, suturing together photos of two Picasso sculptures, turning them into the constantly rotating hands of a clock in “Infinite Loop.” “These works are just as much conflicted with celebrating art history, as they are in exploring the exploitation of modern influences,” Rosch says.

In a 2018 interview Rosch said of his studio, “An open metal barn in an industrial neighborhood, tall ceilings, light, courtyard, tomatoes, BBQ, woodshop, some computers, cameras, tools, a kiln and kitchen shared with a community of artists that have mutual respect for one another, provide perspective, and motivation to become a better artist. I primarily paint in my studio, work with clay in a large courtyard, and build canvas supports, plinths and vitrines in a shared woodshop. I accumulate various material, ceramics, wood, drywall, cement, rebar, conduit and wire – while I am painting on canvas, I paint on this cast of objects. They provide opportunities for future works, collages, sculptures or assemblage.”

== Exhibitions ==
=== Permanent collections ===
- Deutsche Bank, New York, New York
- Gilbert and Lila Silverman Collection, Museum of Modern Art, New York, New York

=== Awards ===
- 2009 Artadia Award, New York, New York

=== Solo exhibitions ===
- Et al., San Francisco, CA
- Halsey McKay, East Hampton, NY
- Adams & Ollman, Portland, OR
- ACME., Los Angeles, CA
- Dolphin Gallery, Kansas City, MO
- Greg Kucera Gallery, Seattle, WA
- Toves Galleri, Copenhagen, Denmark
- DCKT Contemporary, New York City, New York
- Baer Ridgway Exhibitions, San Francisco, California
- Allston Skirt Gallery, Boston, Massachusetts

=== Group exhibitions ===
- Visible and Permanent, Carrie Secrist Gallery, Chicago, IL
- Collectors, R/SF, San Francisco, CA
- Above, Accents, Across, Artadia Alum at Minnesota Street Project, San Francisco, CA
- Reference / Material, Towson University Center For The Arts Gallery, Towson, MD
- Chain Reaction, San Francisco Arts Commission Gallery, San Francisco, CA
- a plot of land, Dutton gallery, New York, NY
- Survey of Work by Self-Taught Artists, Greg Kucera, Seattle, WA
- 4x40, Southern Exposure, San Francisco, CA
- Key Figures, Adams Ollman, Portland, OR
- Works of Paper II, ACME. Los Angeles
- Allegorical Procedures: Bay Area Collage, 1950s - Present, Fine Arts Gallery, SFSU, SF, CA
- Artadia 15th Yr Anniversary. Longhouse Projects, New York, NY
- OK Great Thanks, This is ALSO RIDICULOUS, DCKT, New York, NY
- OK Great Thanks, This is SO RIDICULOUS, ACME, Los Angeles, CA
- The Possible, Berkeley Art Museum, Berkeley, CA
- Shorthand, DCKT Contemporary, New York, NY
- Affinity Atlas, Wellin Museum of Art, Hamilton College, NY
- Exceptional Journeys, 3 + 1 ARTE CONTEMPORANEA, Lisbon, Portugal
- Material Deposits, Atlanta Contemporary Art Center, Atlanta, GA
- Bay Area Now 6, Yerba Buena Center for the Arts, San Francisco, CA
- Off Camera, Fleisher/Ollman Gallery, Philadelphia, PA
- Go West, Salt Lake Art Center, Salt Lake City, UT
- Ultrasonic V, Mark Moore Gallery, Santa Monica, CA
- Cutters, Pool Gallery, Berlin, Germany
- Censored Approved, Dolphin Gallery, Kansas City, MO
- Trace Elements, San Francisco Arts Commission Gallery, San Francisco, CA
- It's Not Us, It's You, San Jose Institute of Contemporary Art, San Jose, CA
