= Zheng Chongbin =

Contemporary California-based visual artist

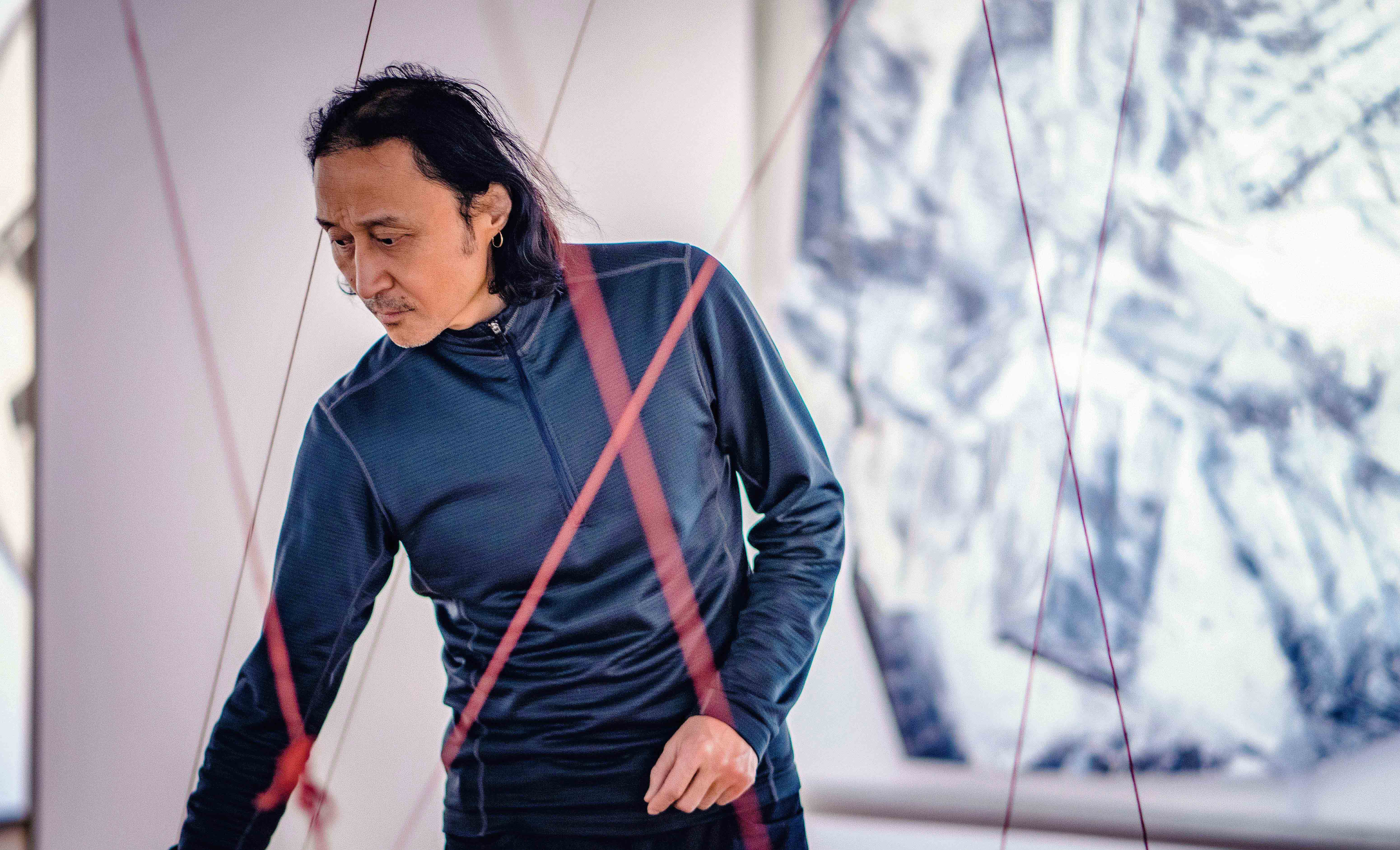
- Born: 1961 (age 64–65); Shanghai
- Education: San Francisco Art Institute; Zhejiang Academy of Fine Arts (now China Academy of Art)
- Occupation: Artist
- Website: https://www.zhengchongbin.com/

Zheng Chongbin (born 1961, Shanghai) is an American contemporary visual artist, who has worked in ink and acrylic paintings, light and space installations and digital media. His practice is influenced by New Materialism. Zheng's works are located in museum and private collections in the US, Europe and Asia, including New York's Metropolitan Museum of Art, London's British Museum and Hong Kong's M+.

== Early life ==
Zheng started his art training in 1970s Shanghai during the Cultural Revolution (1966–1976), taking private art classes run by Mu Yilin and Chen Jialing. During his formative years China's art education system followed the principles of classic Chinese art and Soviet Socialist Realism. Zheng's graduation project was influenced by this environment, resulting in gongbi ink paintings, depicting scenes of Tibetan rural life and labour, observed during a 1983 trip to Tibet.

From 1984 to 1988, Zheng worked as a teacher in figurative Chinese ink painting at the Zhejiang Academy of Fine Arts. During the 1980s, China's Open Door Policy allowed access to previously forbidden art forms, including Impressionism and American Abstract Expressionism. In 1985, Zheng travelled to Beijing with artist Andreas Schmid to see an exhibition Rauschenberg Overseas Cultural Interchange at Beijing's National Art Museum of China. These exposures impacted Zheng's early works, including Another State of Man (second half of the 1980s), where he combined ink and acrylic on paper to create anthropomorphic figures inspired by Francis Bacon and Max Beckmann. In 1988, Zheng had a solo exhibition Chongbin Zheng, organised by the Shanghai Art Museum.

Zheng moved to California in 1988. He completed the First International Fellowship and the MFA degree at the San Francisco Art Institute between 1989 and 1991. Zheng studied installation art under the guidance of David Ireland, Tom Marioni and Tony Labat. In 1992, he received his green card and established his residence in the San Francisco Bay Area. During this transitional period, his work Dual Heads (1994), commented on the divided cultural identity experienced by Asian American migrants.

== Recent works ==
=== Ink media paintings ===
In the later 1990s, Zheng started making ink paintings. He arranges his paintings, including Unfolding Landscape (2015), as a series of cut and folded paper sheets, mounted at various angles, while applying diverse textures of ink and acrylic paint. His techniques include moving a scraper along the surface of just-poured paint, which results in the emergence of spontaneously created dots and fractal lines within the artwork. Zheng is interested in New Materialism, resonating with the writings of scholars Karen Barad, Quentin Meillassoux and Timothy Morton.

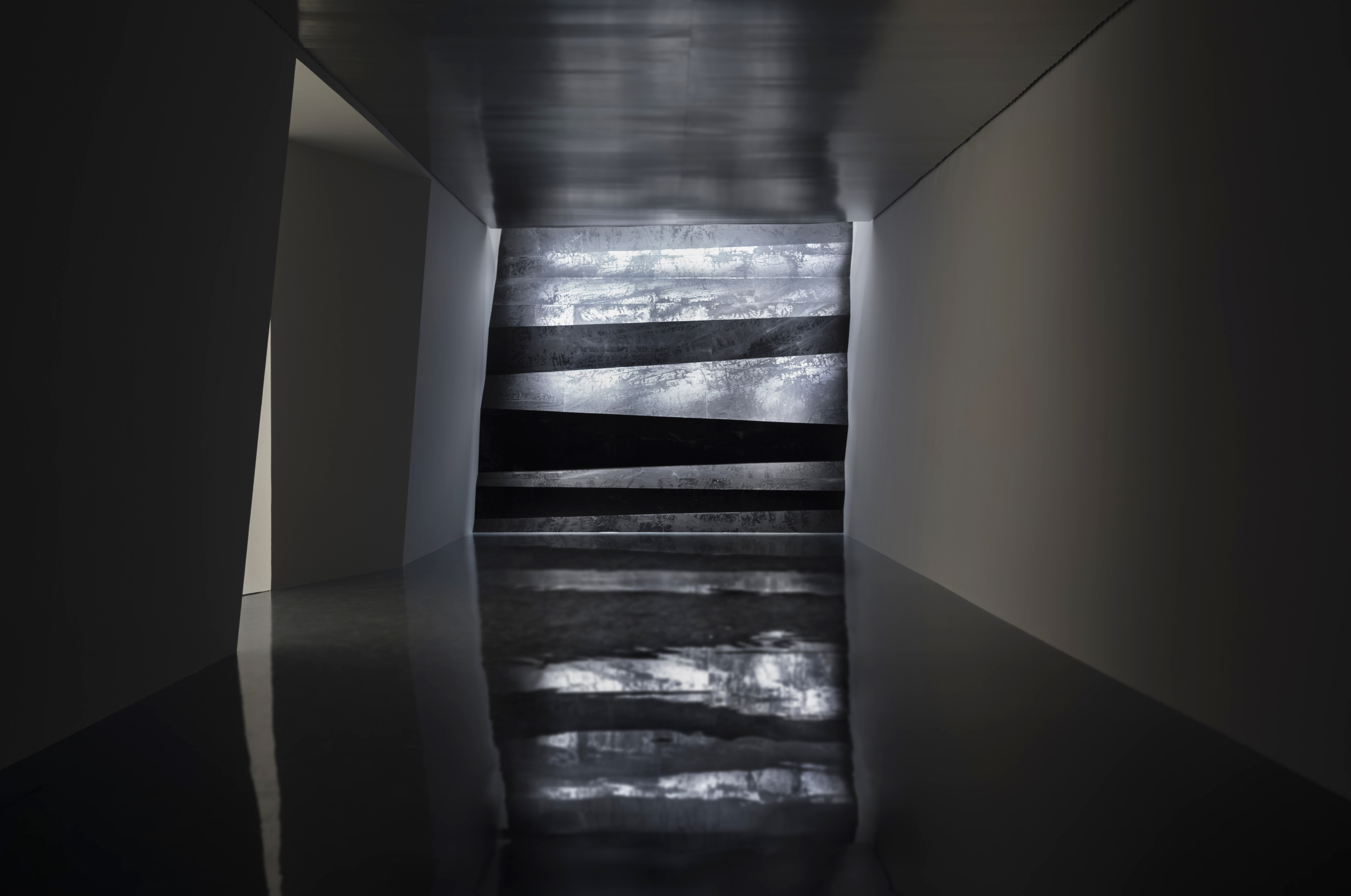
Zheng Chongbin, Wall of Skies, 2015, Light and Space installation

=== Light and space installations ===
Examples of Zheng's light and space installations include Mesh (2018) exhibited at Zheng Chongbin: solo exhibition Zheng Chongbin Golden State (2025–2026) at Los Angeles County Museum of Art, Liquid Space (2019), exhibited in 2019 at the Ryosoku-in temple within the Kennin-ji temple complex in Kyoto, and Wall of Skies (2015), shown at the 2016 Eleventh Shanghai Biennale. He incorporates see-through scrims, optical light films and custom-built reflective surfaces, like the mirrored floor used in Wall of Skies.

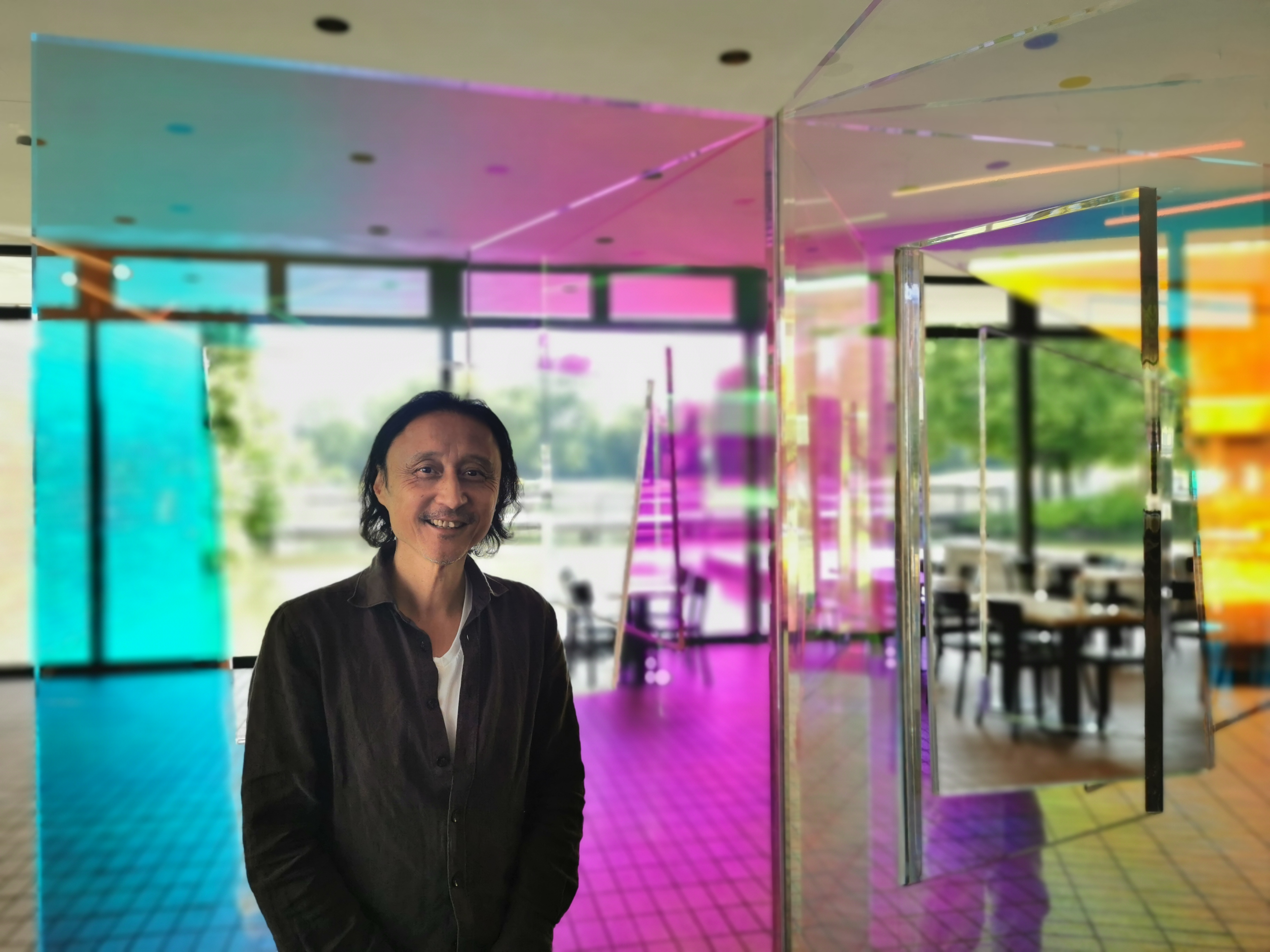
Zheng Chongbin (2025) in the Museum of East Asian Art in Cologne (Germany)

Zheng Chongbin's collaborative commission of the light-space installation, With or Without Edge (2025), at the Museum für Ostasiatische Kunst Köln (MOK), is a permanent light-space installation that occupies a unique contemporary position in the foyer of the MOK. A collaborative and site-specific commission, it comprises two aesthetically and conceptually corresponding, yet distinct works of art: Andreas Schmid's ceiling-hung light sculpture Geste im Raum (Gesture in Space) and Zheng Chongbin's freestanding spatial sculpture With or Without Edge .

The collaborative project marks the first collaboration between the artists. Schmid and Zheng, whose exchange is characterized by a long-standing personal connection, are both considered key players in the field of transcultural contemporary art with an East Asian connection.

=== Digital media works ===
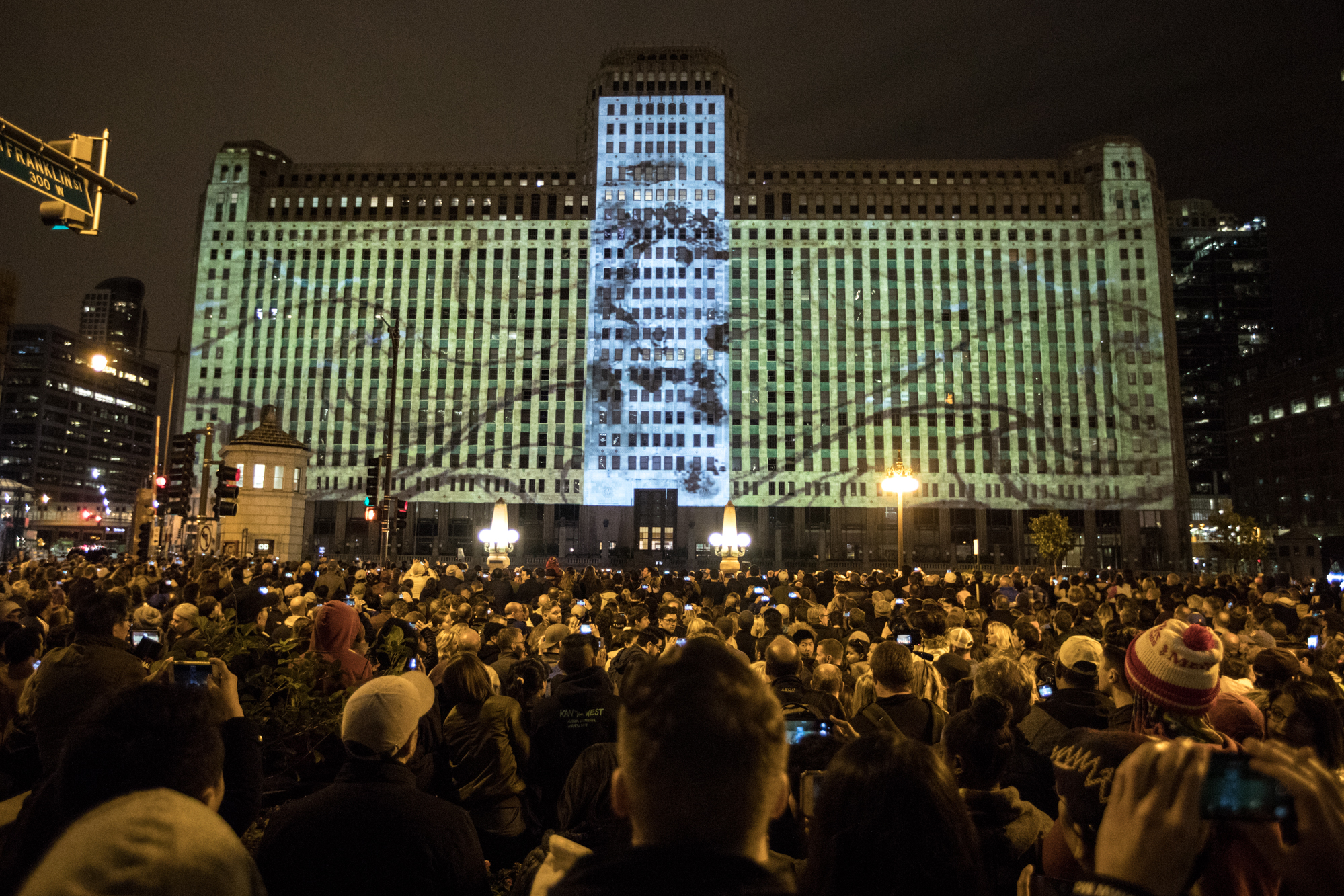
Projection of Zheng Chongbin's Chimeric Landscape (2015) at Art on theMART, Chicago, 2018

Zheng's first digital video work was Chimeric Landscape (2015), installed at Pallazzo Bembo in Venice in 2015. Zheng used footage of various life forms, combining snapshots of the natural world, such as splashing waves, with scientific materials, including topographical NASA images and microscopic views of molecules. In 2018, Chimeric Landscape was adapted for an exhibition Art on theMART, displayed onto Chicago's historic building theMART.

Additional examples of Zheng's digital media installations include State of Oscillation (2020), exhibited at the Asian Art Museum in San Francisco, and Branches Are Roots in the Sky (2017), exhibited at the Los Angeles County Museum of Art.

== Exhibitions ==
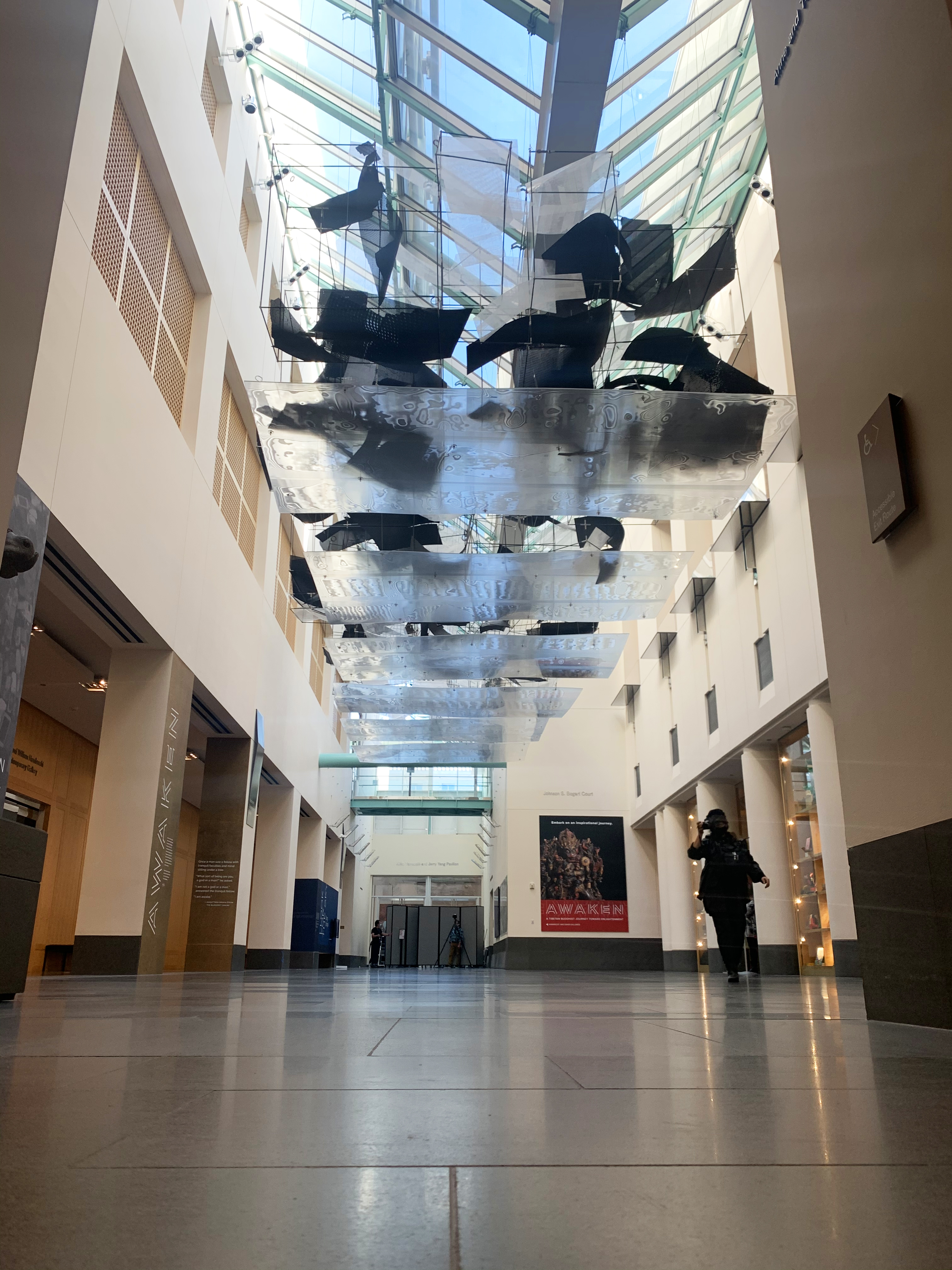
Installation of Zheng Chongbin's I Look for the Sky (2020) at the Asian Art Museum, San Francisco, 2021

=== Selected solo exhibitions ===
- Zheng Chongbin: Golden State (2025–2026, Los Angeles County Museum of Art)
- A 10,000-Year View (2022, Hong Kong Museum of Art)
- Zheng Chongbin: I Look for the Sky (2021, Asian Art Museum, San Francisco)
- Liquid Space (2019, Ryosoku-in Temple, Kennin-ji, Kyoto)
- Zheng Chongbin: Clusters of Memory (2017, Asia Society, Houston)
- The Pacific Project: Zheng Chongbin (2016, Orange County Museum of Art, New Port)
- Zheng Chongbin: Impulse, Matter, Form (2013, INK studio, Beijing)
- White Ink: Fresharp Artists’ Series (2011, Chinese Culture Center of San Francisco)

=== Selected group exhibitions ===
- The 3rd Exhibition of GDMoA Annual Artist Nomination 2025 (2025, Guangdong Museum of Art)
- Ink Dreams: Selections from the Fondation INK Collection (2021, Los Angeles County Museum of Art)
- Art on theMART (2018, Chicago's city public art project)
- Ink Worlds: Contemporary Chinese Painting from the Collection of Akiko Yamazaki and Jerry Yang (2018, Cantor Arts Center, Stanford University)
- Streams and Mountains without End: Landscape Traditions of China (2017, Metropolitan Museum of Art, New York)
- Why Not Ask Again (2016, Eleventh Shanghai Biennale)
- Personal Structures: Crossing Borders (2015, organised by European Cultural Centre, held at Palazzo Bembo and Palazzo Mora, Venice)
- From a Poem to the Sunset: Daimler Art Collection (2015, Daimler Contemporary Berlin)
- Ink: The Art of China (2012, Saatchi Gallery, London)
- China’s Imperial Modern: The Painter’s Craft (2012, University of Alberta Museums, Edmonton)
- Reboot (2007, Third Chengdu Biennale)

== Awards ==
- San Francisco Art Institute’s First International Fellowship, 1989
- Commission from Moshe Safdie Associates and Singapore's Marina Bay Sands for a site-specific installation Rising Forest (2008–2010) This installation was displayed at Marina Bay Sands alongside works by artists Antony Gormley and Sol LeWitt.
- Artist Excellence Exhibition Series Grant by the San Francisco Chinese Cultural Foundation (2010–2011)
- Inaugural Artist for a Chicago-based digital art project Art on theMART, 2018
- Asia Game Changer West Award from the Asia Society's Northern California Center, 2021
