= William Swanson (artist) =

American painter

- Born: 1970 (age 55–56); Chicago, Illinois
- Education: BFA, Rhode Island School of Design
- Known for: painting

William Swanson (born 1970, Chicago, IL) is a painter living and working in Oakland, California.

== Works ==
Swanson’s paintings offer seemingly utopian views of a futuristic urban landscape. These architectural compositions reflect back to the artist’s architectural training as well as to the illusionist works of artists like M.C. Esher. Nevertheless they are unique in that the futuristic urban landscape is commenting on battle with natural forces. Remnants of buildings and other man made structures cascade in silhouettes throughout the islands floating on the picture plane of many paintings. This is only possible with the artist’s dynamic use of depth. Each structure contains parts that appear to float off the canvas and into the viewer’s space. Swanson’s technique reveals little trace of his brushstroke as he uses acrylic paint on plywood to create very flat surfaces.

His work has been included in many group exhibitions, including “Future Tense: Reshaping the Landscape” at the Neuberger Art Museum in Purchase, NY.
