= Bernhard Rösch =

Austrian politician (born 1963)

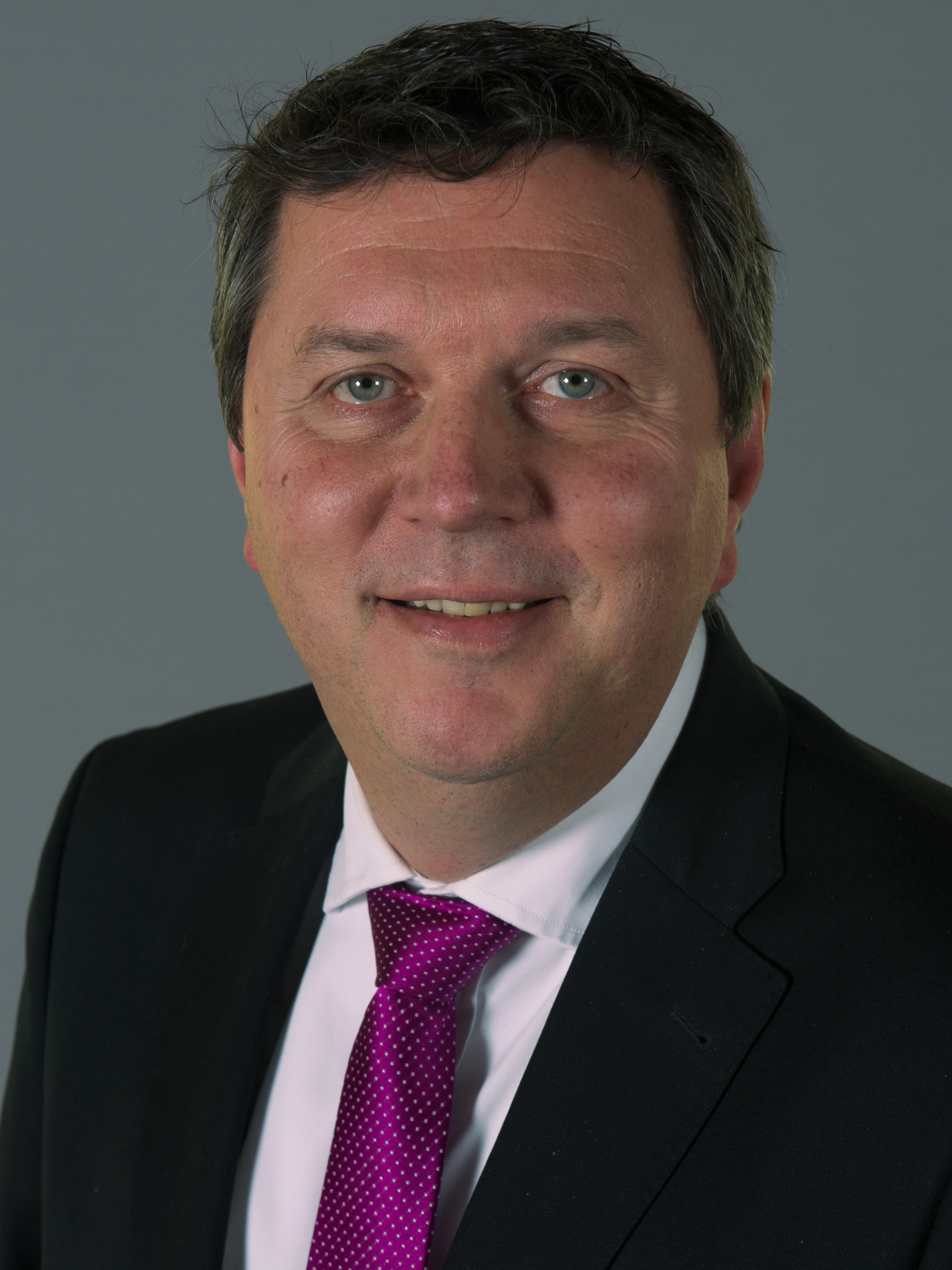

Member of the Federal Council
- Incumbent
- Assumed office 24 November 2015

Personal details
- Born: 3 February 1963 (age 63)
- Party: Freedom Party of Austria

Bernhard Rösch (born 3 February 1963) is an Austrian politician who has been a Member of the Federal Council for the Freedom Party of Austria (FPÖ) since 2015.
