= Beili Liu =

Chinese-born US-based visual artist (born 1974)

Beili Liu (artist)
- 刘北立 劉北立
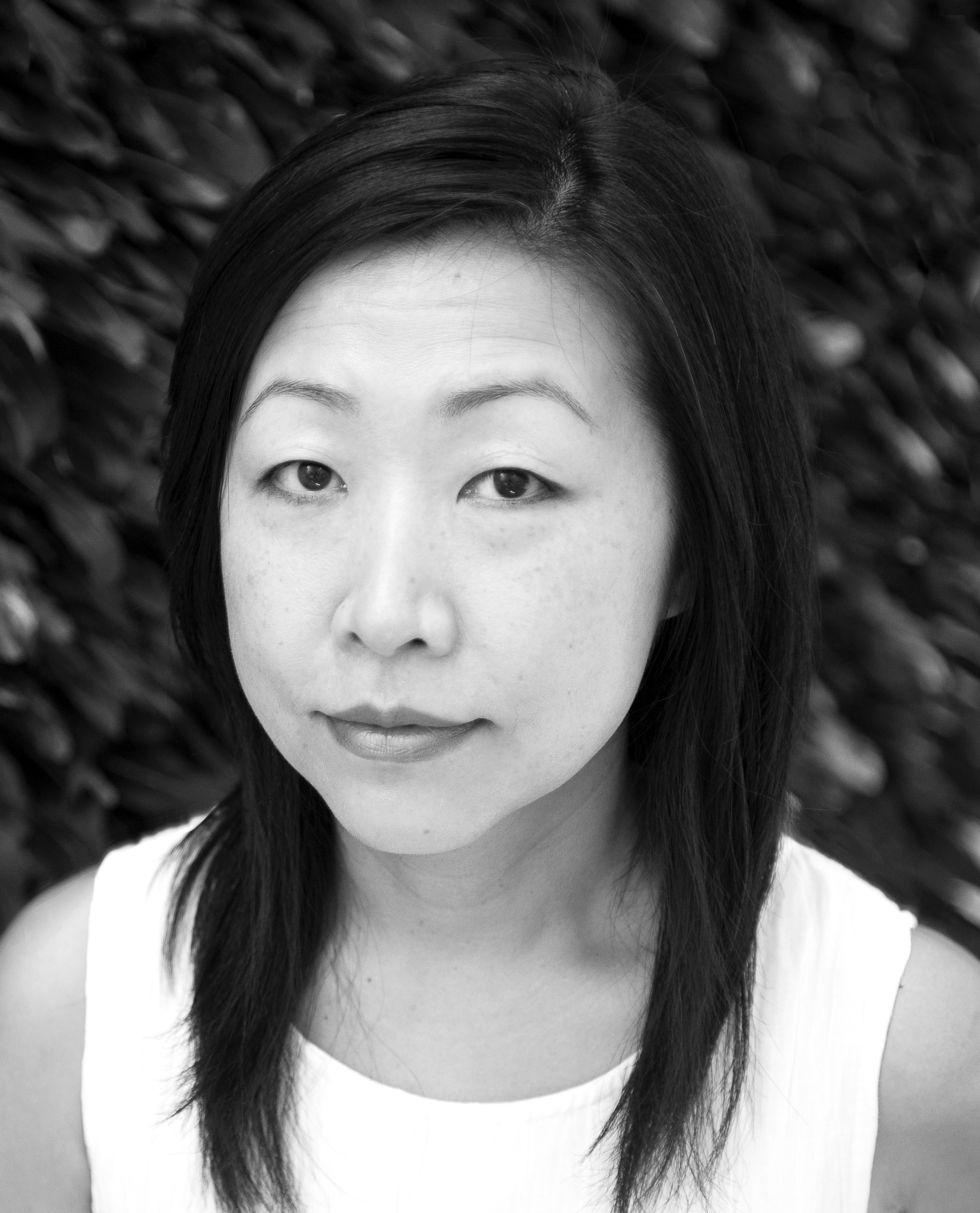
- Born: 1974 (age 51–52); Jilin, China
- Education: University of Michigan, Ann Arbor
- Known for: Installation, public art, fiber art, performance, drawing
- Awards: Andrew Carnegie Fellowship; Pollock Prize for Creativity; Fulbright Distinguished Arctic Chair; Joan Mitchell Foundation Painters and Sculptors Grant; National Endowment for the Arts Challenge America Grant; Texas State Artist in 3D Media
- Website: beililiu.com

Beili Liu (Chinese: 刘北立; born 1974) is a Chinese-born US-based visual artist who makes large-scale, process-driven sculptural environments that examine themes of migration, cultural memory, materiality, labor, social and environmental concerns. Through unconventional use of commonplace materials and elements such as thread, needle, scissors, feather, salt, wax, and cement, Liu extrapolates complex cultural narratives through a hybrid work form that merges site-responsive installation, sculpture, public art, and performance. Liu lives and works in Austin, Texas. Liu is the Leslie Waggener Professor in the Fine Arts and is a University of Texas System Regents' Outstanding Teaching Professor at the University of Texas at Austin.

== Early life ==
Beili Liu was born in a farming village in the Northeast province of Jilin, China to parents who were among the 16 million sent-down youth during China's Cultural Revolution. After ten years of exile and re-education in the countryside, her parents relocated to the Northeast Chinese industrial city of Shenyang. In 1989, one month before the Tiananmen Square Protests, her family migrated to the southern coastal city of Shenzhen, a major manufacturing center and economic hub bordering Hong Kong and one of four "Special Economic Zones" designated at the early stage of the reform and opening up.

== Education ==
Liu attended Shenzhen University, studying Chinese Literature before immigrating to the US in 1995. Liu received a Bachelor of Arts degree from the University of Tennessee, Knoxville in 2001 and a Master of Fine Arts degree from the University of Michigan, Ann Arbor in 2003 as a Barbour Scholar.

== Career ==
Early in Liu's career senior critic Janet Kaplos remarked in Art in America (2009) that Liu's installations were "materially simple but metaphorically rich." DeWitt Cheng, art critic for Artillery, noted in 2012 that "The idea of aggression and danger halted by gentle restraint is ... embodied" in Liu's site-specific installations.

Beili Liu has held solo exhibitions at the Crow Museum of Asian Art (2020), Dallas, Texas, Galerie An Der Pinakothek Der Moderne, Munich, Germany (2018, 2011), Hå Gamle Prestegard, Norwegian National Art and Culture Museum (2016, 2011), Hua Gallery, London, UK (2012), Elisabeth de Brabant Art Center, Shanghai, China (2009), and the Chinese Culture Foundation, San Francisco (2015, 2008). Liu's work has been showcased in group exhibitions at 何香凝美术馆 Hexiangning Museum of Art, Shenzhen, China (2022), Artpace, San Antonio (2021), the New Orleans Museum of Art (2020), Asia Society Texas Center (2022, 2019), Bunkier Sztuki Gallery, Kraków, Poland (2017), 杭州纤维三年展 Hangzhou Triennial of Fiber Art, Zhejiang Art Museum, China (2016), National Museum for Women in the Arts, Washington, D.C. (2012), Hamburg Art Week, Germany (2012), the Kaunas Biennale, National M. K. Ciurlionis Art Museum, Lithuania (2011), and the 23rd and 25th Miniartextil International Contemporary Fiber Art exhibitions in Como, Italy (2015, 2013).

== Honors and grants ==
Beili Liu is a 2022-2024 Andrew Carnegie Fellow, representing the first visual artist awarded this humanities and social sciences fellowship in support of scholarship that "addresses important and enduring issues confronting our society." Liu received the 2022 Pollock Prize for Creativity and the Brian Wall Brian Wall Foundation Grant for Sculptors through the Pollock-Krasner Foundation. Liu is a 2021-2022 Fulbright Distinguished Scholar as the Arctic Chair to Norway, and a 2016 Joan Mitchell Painters and Sculptors Grant recipient. Liu has been designated the 2018 Texas State Artist in 3D medium by the Texas State Legislature and the Texas Commission on The Arts. Beili Liu's work has received support from the National Endowment for the Arts Challenge America Grant for her exhibition at the Art Museum of Southeast Texas, 2014. Liu's public art project Sky Bridge was named Best Public Art Installation by KQED. In 2013, Liu was invited by Women & Their Work Gallery to create a collaborative public art project THIRST, which was supported in part by a Robert Rauschenberg Foundation Artistic Innovation and Collaboration Grant. Liu has held a number of artist residency fellowships, including the Joan Mitchell Center, Studios at MASS MoCA, Facebook AIR, Austin TX, Fiskars AIR, Finland, Djerassi Foundation, Woodside, CA, and Fundación Valparaíso, Spain, Art Farm, Nebraska. She received a Distinction award at the Kaunas Biennial Lithuania (2011), and was honoured by a San Francisco Mayor's Award (2008) for her contribution to cultural exchange.
