= Mill Creek Marsh =

Nature preserve in Hudson County, New Jersey, US

Coordinates: 40°48′06″N 74°02′28″W

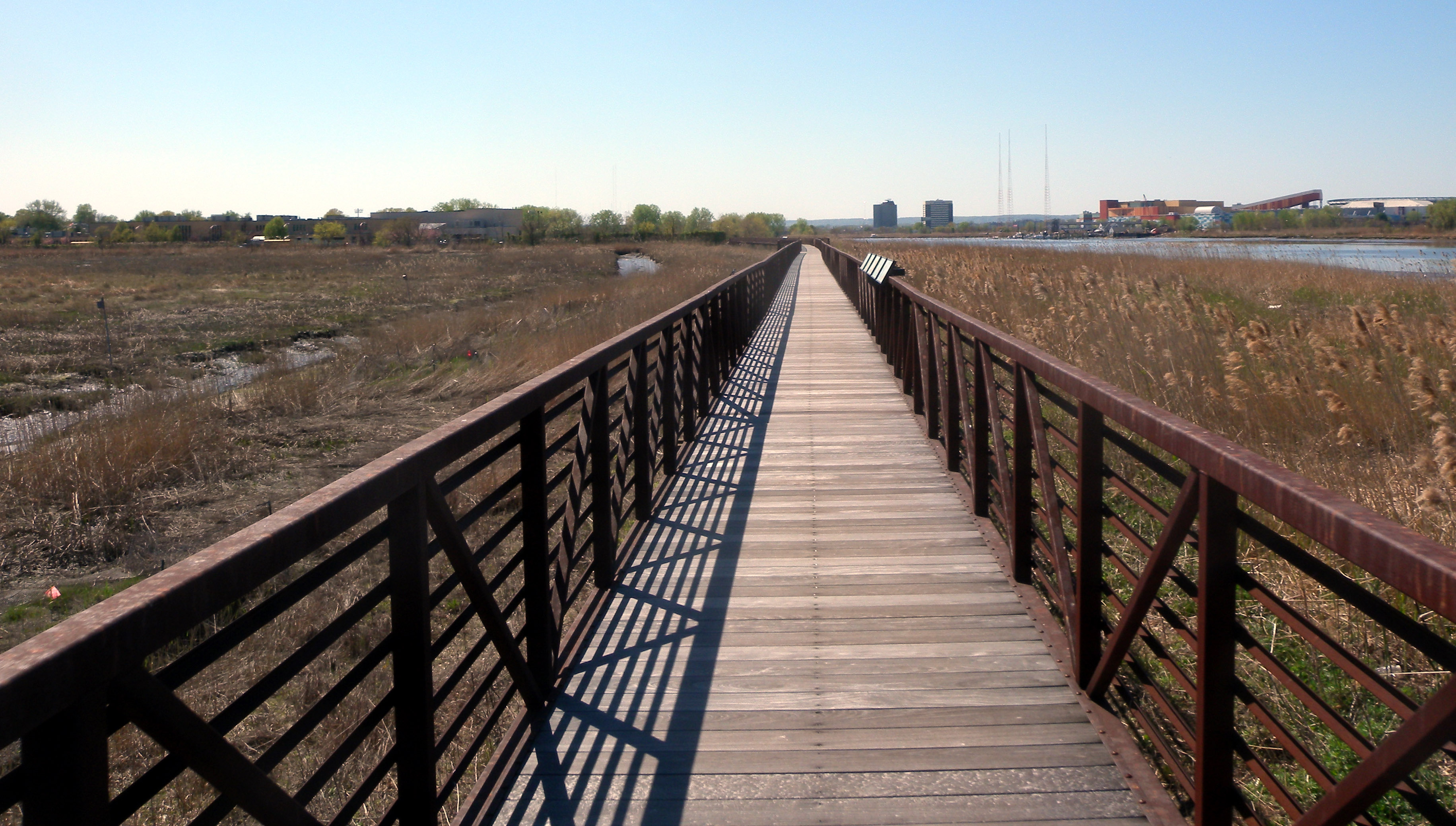
Mill Creek Point on Hackensack River with American Dream Meadowlands in background

Mill Creek Marsh is a nature preserve in the New Jersey Meadowlands located in Secaucus at its border with North Bergen, the Cromakill Creek, in Hudson County, New Jersey. It is fed by the Hackensack River, and is a contributing property to the Hackensack RiverWalk.

It is contiguous to the west by Mill Creek and the Schmidts Woods and Secaucus High School, to the north by Western Brackish Marsh, to the east by the Eastern Brackish Marsh, and Cromakill Marsh.

The Eastern Spur of New Jersey Turnpike runs through the nature area, which is bordered to the south by The Plaza at Harmon Meadow, which includes the Mall at Mill Creek.

It is separate from the Saw Mill Creek Marsh in Kearny.

== History ==
Much of the land was acquired from Hartz Mountain. The 209-acre Mill Creek Marsh was acquired for preservation by the New Jersey Meadowlands Commission in 1996. Two years later, the commission began to remediate the site, including re-establishing the tidal flow, constructing trails and planting native vegetation.

== Flora ==
The area of Mill creek contain many trees such as mulberries, willow, blue spruce, river birch, eastern red cedar, eastern cottonwood and black locust trees. Phragmites are so common in the lower parts of the park. Also Smooth cordgrass is somewhat common but not as much as the reeds.

== See also ==
- Berrys Creek
