= Weehawken High School =

High school in Hudson County, New Jersey, US

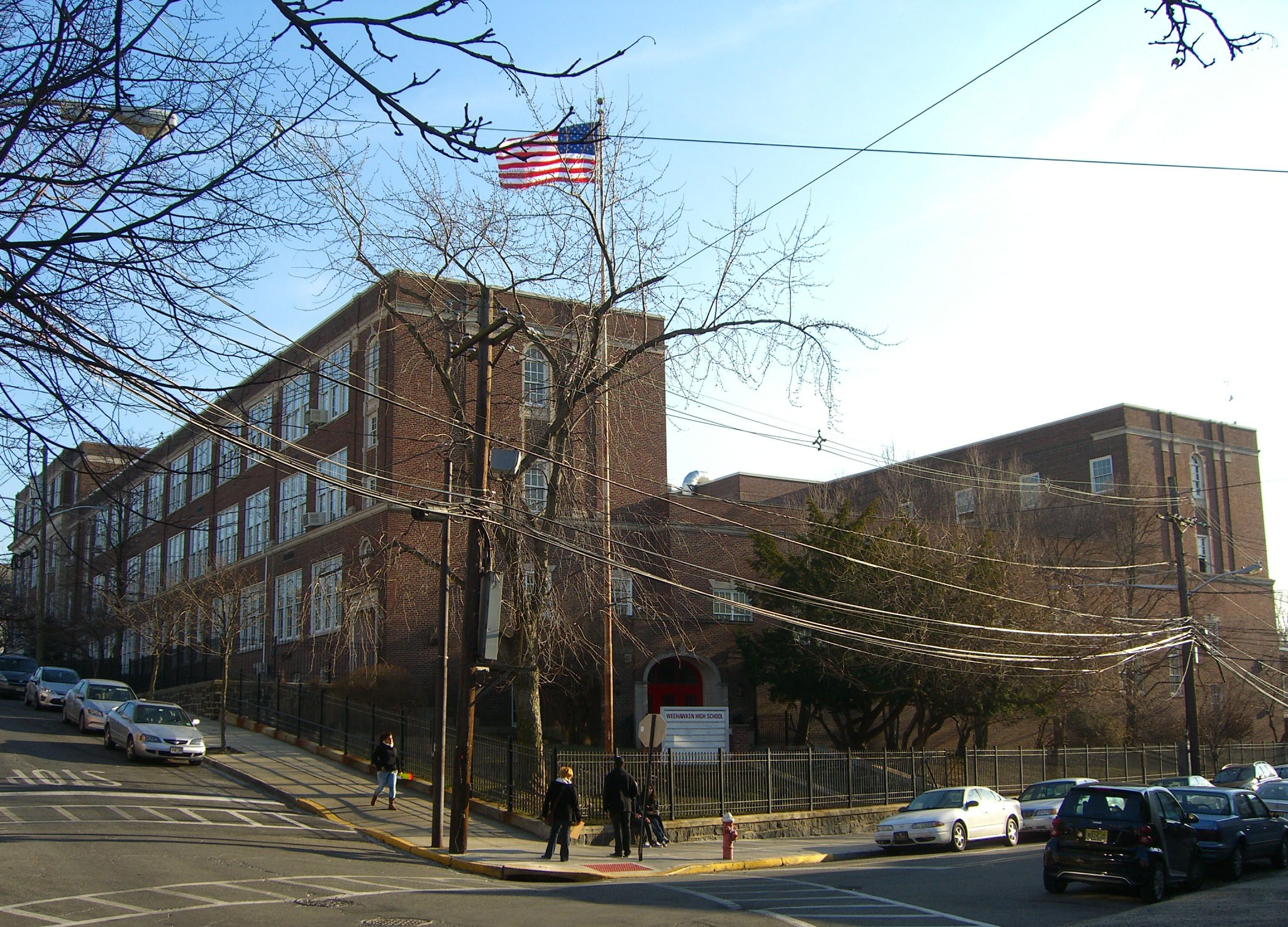

Location
- 53 Liberty Place; Weehawken, New Jersey 07086; United States; 40.774141°N 74.018294°W

Information
- Type: Public high school
- Established: 1940 (building)
- School district: Weehawken School District
- NCES School ID: 341731002928
- Principal: Robert Ferullo
- Faculty: 50.0 FTEs
- Grades: 7–12
- Enrollment: 604 (as of 2024–25)
- Student to teacher ratio: 12.1:1
- Colors: Red and Black
- Athletics conference: North Jersey Interscholastic Conference
- Team name: Indians
- Newspaper: Indian Ink
- Yearbook: The Zenith
- Website: whs.weehawkenschools.net

Weehawken High School is a six-year comprehensive public high school that serves students in seventh through twelfth grade from Weehawken in Hudson County, in the U.S. state of New Jersey, operating as part of the Weehawken School District. The school has been accredited by the Middle States Association of Colleges and Schools Commission on Elementary and Secondary Schools since 1928.

As of the 2024–25 school year, the school had an enrollment of 604 students and 50.0 classroom teachers (on an FTE basis), for a student–teacher ratio of 12.1:1. There were 287 students (47.5% of enrollment) eligible for free lunch and 32 (5.3% of students) eligible for reduced-cost lunch.

== History ==
The campus, located across the Hudson River from New York City, just west of Boulevard East atop the New Jersey Palisades, consists of a three-story brick structure located in a residential area completed in 1940. The building includes three computer labs; a science, technology, engineering, arts, and mathematics (STEAM) lab; an ITV room, a modern library/media center, science labs, an auditorium that can accommodate 800, and a newly renovated gymnasium with a seating capacity of 1,200. The facility has been used by Hudson Theatre Works, a non-profit regional performance group based in Weehawken.

Students from Secaucus had attended the high school as part of a sending/receiving relationship with the Secaucus Board of Education, until the opening of Secaucus High School in 1976.

== Awards, recognition and rankings ==
The school was the 189th-ranked public high school in New Jersey out of 339 schools statewide in New Jersey Monthly magazine's September 2014 cover story on the state's "Top Public High Schools", using a new ranking methodology. The school had been ranked 91st in the state of 328 schools in 2012, after being ranked 104th in 2010 out of 322 schools listed. The magazine ranked the school 119th in 2008 out of 316 schools. The school was ranked 109th in the magazine's September 2006 issue, which surveyed 316 schools across the state. SchoolDigger.com ranked the school 170th out of 381 public high schools statewide in its 2011 rankings (an increase of 34 positions from the 2010 ranking) which were based on the combined percentage of students classified as proficient or above proficient on the mathematics (82.5%) and language arts literacy (91.9%) components of the High School Proficiency Assessment (HSPA).

== Curriculum ==
Students are offered Advanced Placement (AP) classes in many subjects, including AP United States History, AP Statistics, AP Calculus AB, AP Macroeconomics, and AP Spanish Language. College preparatory classes throughout high school, as well as electives offered in conjunction with St. Peter's College in Jersey City, New Jersey.

Weehawken allows Juniors to take a free Princeton Review SAT prep class either Monday or Wednesday afternoons.

== Extracurricular activities ==
=== Marching band ===
In 2012 and 2013, the Weehawken High School Marching Band, under the direction of Michael Lichtenfeld and his band staff, ranked first in the state of New Jersey winning the USBands Group 1A state championship title. (Group 1A division is a band with 40 or fewer people on the field during competition). In November 2013, the band won the USBands Group 1A National Championship title.

In 2015, under the direction of band director Natalie Kerr and the band staff, the band won the USBands Group 1 Open Class New Jersey State Championships. Also under Band Director Natalie Kerr, the Weehawken marching band competed in Tournament of Bands Group 1A in 2016, going undefeated and winning the NYC Metro Regional Championships as well as defeating 25 other bands for the ACC Group 1A championships. The band's score was above 95, and helped promote them to Open Class for the 2017 season.

Returning to USBands competition for the 2017 season, the band completed an undefeated competitive season under the direction of Minesh Shah, including capturing the USBands Group 1A State Championship and Group 1A National Championships. The following season, now under the direction of Ryan Gorman, the band won another Group 1A State Championship and finished 3rd at National Championships, winning the caption award for Best Music. In 2019, the band membership increased to approximately 50 performers, and the band moved up to the USBands Group 2A class. The band won their 3rd consecutive NJ State Championship in October 2019, their first as part of Group 2A.

=== Athletics ===
The Weehawken High School Indians participate in the North Jersey Interscholastic Conference, which is comprised of small-enrollment schools in Bergen, Hudson, Morris County and Passaic County counties, and was established following a reorganization of sports leagues in Northern New Jersey by the New Jersey State Interscholastic Athletic Association (NJSIAA). Prior to realignment that took effect in the fall of 2010, Weehawken was a member of the National Division of the Bergen County Scholastic League (BCSL), which included schools in Bergen and Hudson counties. With 294 students in grades 10–12, the school was classified by the NJSIAA for the 2019–20 school year as Group I for most athletic competition purposes, which included schools with an enrollment of 75 to 476 students in that grade range. The school was classified by the NJSIAA as Group I North for football for 2024–2026, which included schools with 254 to 474 students.

The school participates as the host school / lead agency in a joint boys lacrosse team with Hoboken High School. In turn, Hoboken is the host school for a joint girls lacrosse team. These co-op programs operate under agreements scheduled to expire at the end of the 2023–24 school year.

Interscholastic sports teams offered at the school include:

- Fall – USBands Competition Marching Band and Color Guard, Cheerleading, Football, Soccer (boys/girls) and Volleyball (girls)
- Winter – Basketball (boys/girls), Cheerleading and Wrestling
- Spring – Baseball (boys) and Softball (girls)

The boys' basketball team won the Group III state championship in 1933 (defeating Hamilton High School in the tournament final) and 1938 (vs. Rutherford High School), and won the Group II title in 1942 (vs. Neptune High School), 1943 (vs. Highland Park High School), 1946 (vs. Verona High School), 1953 (vs. Red Bank Regional High School), 1954 (vs. Sayreville High School) and 1955 (vs. Palmyra High School). The eight group championships won by the program is tied for seventh-most among all schools in the state and the third-most among public schools. After losing in the finals in three of the previous for seasons, the 1933 team beat Hamilton Township by a score of 40–22 to win the Group III state title. The 1953 team won the Group II title with a 60–45 win against Red Bank Regional in the championship game. The 1954 team repeated as champion after defeating Sayreville by a score of 71–60 in the Group II final at the Elizabeth Armory.

The boys' soccer team was awarded the Group II state championship in 1951 and 1952.

In 2020, the name of the teams and their mascot came under question, with some opposing the "Indians" team name and others arguing for its retention.

=== Clubs ===
Extracurricular clubs offered include:

- Academic Team, Hudson County Champions in 2003 and 2004, National Academic Championship Competitors in 2004
- Beekeeping
- The Zenith, the school's student-run yearbook, has been an award winner in the Columbia Scholastic Press Association's annual contest

== Administration ==
The school's principal is Robert Ferullo. Core members of his administrative team includes the assistant principal.

== Notable alumni ==
Notable alumni include those inducted into the school's hall of fame

- James L. Brooks (born 1940), director, producer and screenwriter
- John Diebold (1926–2005, class of 1943), computer scientist, considered to be an automation evangelist
- Edward Feigenbaum (born 1936, class of 1953), computer scientist who collaborated on the development of the first expert system Dendral
- Anthony Impreveduto (1948–2009, class of 1967), member of the New Jersey General Assembly from 1987–2004
- Frank MacCormack (born 1953, class of 1971), professional baseball player
- Lori Majewski, entertainment writer, communications strategist and consultant
- Steven Massarsky (1948–2007, class of 1966), lawyer and businessman who founded Voyager Communications, parent company of the early 1990s comic book company Valiant Comics
- John J. Matheussen (born 1953), politician who represented the 4th Legislative District in the New Jersey Senate from 1992 to 2003
- David Mearns (born 1958, class of 1976), marine scientist and deep water search and recovery expert, specializing in the discovery of the location of historic shipwrecks
- Jerome Robbins (1918–1998, class of 1935 at Woodrow Wilson High School), choreographer, best known for West Side Story and many works for the New York City Ballet
- Paul van K. Thomson (1916–1999), Roman Catholic priest, author and educator
- Rosemarie Totaro (1933–2018), politician who served two separate stints in the New Jersey General Assembly representing the 23rd Legislative District
- Beverly Whipple (1941–2026), sexologist, author and academic, who co-authored The G Spot and Other Recent Discoveries About Human Sexuality

== See also ==
- List of high schools in New Jersey
