= The Mall at Mill Creek =

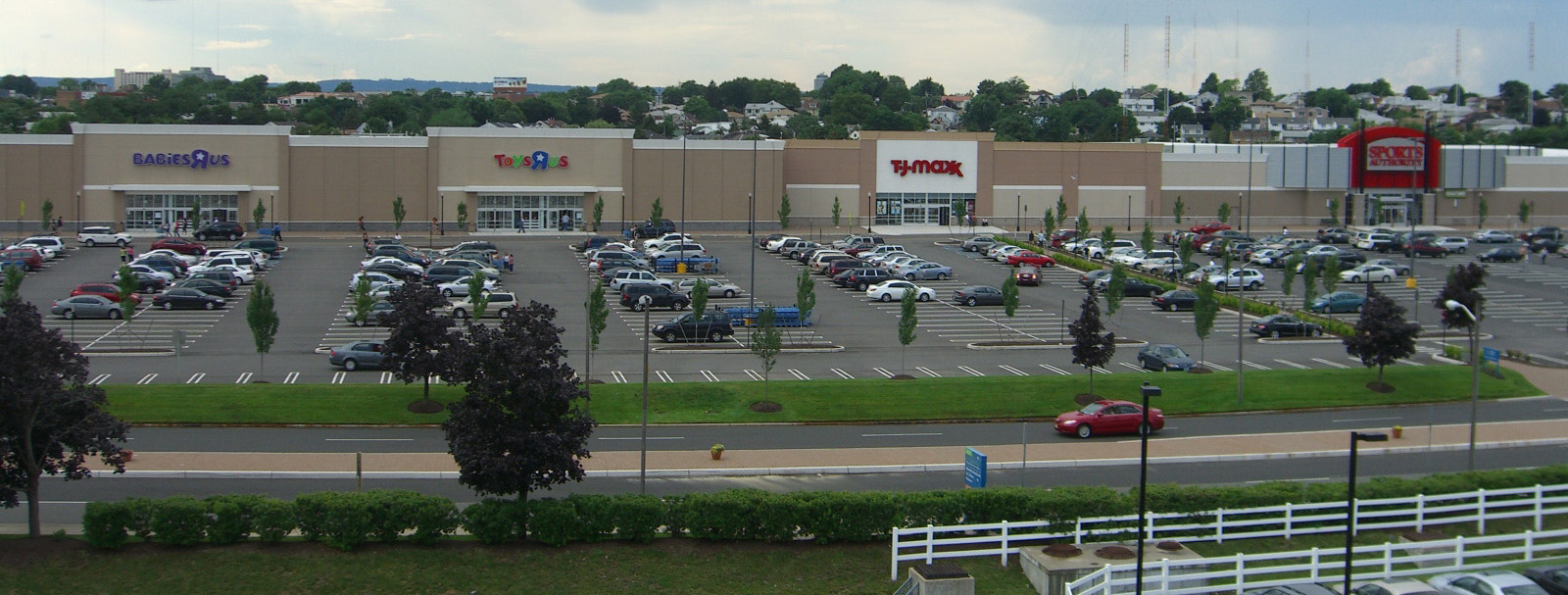
- The Mall at Mill Creek in July 2009
- Location: Secaucus, New Jersey, United States
- Coordinates: 40°47′36″N 74°03′05″W
- Developer: Hartz Mountain Industries
- Owner: Hartz Mountain Industries
- Floor area: 400,000 sq ft (37,000 m^{2})
- Floors: 1
- Public transit: NJ Transit bus: 78, 85, 190, 320

The Mall at Mill Creek, formerly known as Mill Creek Mall, is a strip mall located in Secaucus, New Jersey, United States, in the New Jersey Meadowlands. It is situated in the Harmon Meadow Plaza complex, approximately 6 miles (9.7 km) from New York City, and is owned by Hartz Mountain Industries. The International Council of Shopping Centers lists the mall as having a gross leasable area (GLA) of 400,000 sq ft (37,000 m^{2}).

== History ==
The mall was constructed by Hartz Mountain Industries on a 127-acre (0.51 km^{2}) site of marshland in the New Jersey Meadowlands along the environmentally-sensitive Hackensack River. The mall's developer had sought permission to construct a mall, office complex, and condominiums on the site in the early 1980s. After the condominium portion of the proposal was removed, the plan was approved by the United States Army Corps of Engineers in 1982, which found that Hartz Mountain's proposal would have "no significant adverse environmental impacts", with the stipulation that a 63-acre (250,000 m^{2}) wetland mitigation project of higher ecological value would offset the impact of the fill at the site of the mall complex.

In 1989, the company completed rehabilitation of a 158-acre (0.64 km^{2}) tidal wetland on both sides of the New Jersey Turnpike near the mall, as compensation for its filling the space occupied by the mall. The $6 million effort was performed as part of a mitigation project approved by the Army Corps of Engineers and the United States Environmental Protection Agency.

The 190,000-square-foot (18,000 m^{2}) enclosed section of the mall was supposed to be closed as of October 1, 2007, as part of a redevelopment project that would replace the site with four big-box retails stores. A judge ruled in December 2007 that the four remaining tenants in what had been a 50-store mall with a food court, must vacate their stores by January 1, 2008. The tenants had sued arguing that they would suffer "considerable losses" if forced to move, a claim rejected by a judge of the New Jersey Superior Court who argued that monetary compensation from Hartz Mountain would adequately compensate the tenants for their losses.

== Free speech issues ==
New Jersey state law allows individuals and organizations to distribute information at malls, subject to "reasonable requirements" placed by the mall owner. In 1996, a New Jersey Superior Court judge ruled that the mall's requirement of a $1 million liability insurance policy had to be waived to allow supporters of then-presidential candidate Ralph Nader to distribute campaign literature. After successive appeals, the New Jersey Supreme Court ruled in January 2000 that the insurance policy costing $665 required by the mall and the one-day-per-year limit on leafleting was an unreasonable burden, noting that "putting too high a price on the exercise of that freedom may destroy it."

== Transportation ==
The Plaza is bound on the south by Route 3 and Paterson Plank Road, and is accessible via the 78 and 85 local routes, and the 190 and 320 routes, which travel to and from the Port Authority Bus Terminal in Midtown Manhattan.
