= Max Stern Yezreel Valley College =

Academic college located in Israel

Coordinates: 32°39′4.22″N 35°17′36.65″E

The Max Stern Yezreel Valley Academic College
- המכללה האקדמית עמק יזרעאל ע״ש מקס שטרן
- Motto: The Academy of the North
- Type: Public
- Established: 1965
- Chairman: Theodor Or
- President: Prof. Itzhak Harpaz
- Dean: Dr. Michal Mann
- Faculty: 100
- Students: 4,038
- Undergraduates: 3,702
- Postgraduates: 336
- Location: Jezreel Valley, Israel
- Website: https://www.yvc.ac.il/en

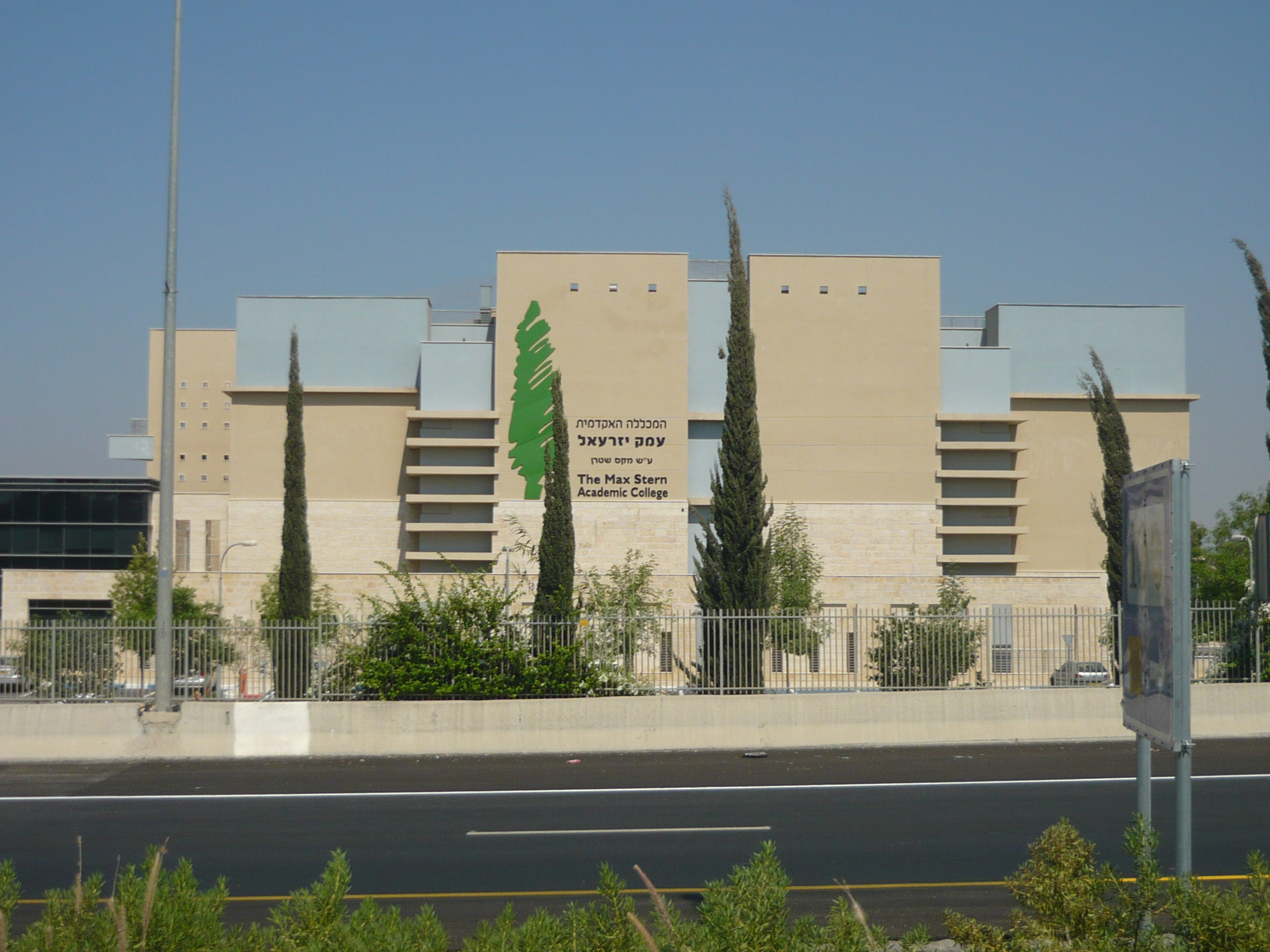

The Max Stern Yezreel Valley College (Hebrew: המכללה האקדמית עמק יזרעאל ע״ש מקס שטרן) is an academic college located in the Jezreel Valley (Galilee region) of Israel, between the cities Afula and Nazareth, and next to Kfar Gid'on, Tel Adashim and Mizra.

Founded in 1965 as Emek Yezreel College, Max Stern College later served as a regional branch of University of Haifa from 1973 to 1994. In 1994 the Israel Council for Higher Education gave accreditation to Max Stern College as an independent academic institution capable of granting bachelor's degrees. The college offers BA degrees to some 5,000 students in a diverse array of fields, including Economics, Behavioral Sciences, Social Sciences, Communication Studies, Human Services, Health Administration, Nursing Studies and General Studies.

The college is named after Max Stern, whose son Leonard N. Stern gave a monetary gift in his name when he died.

== See also ==
- List of universities and colleges in Israel
