= East Coast Comicon =

- Status: Active
- Venue: Meadowlands Exposition Center
- Locations: Secaucus, New Jersey, U.S.
- Inaugurated: 2011
- Founder: Cliff Galbraith
- Organizer: Crucial Entertainment, LLC
- Website: eastcoastcomicon.com

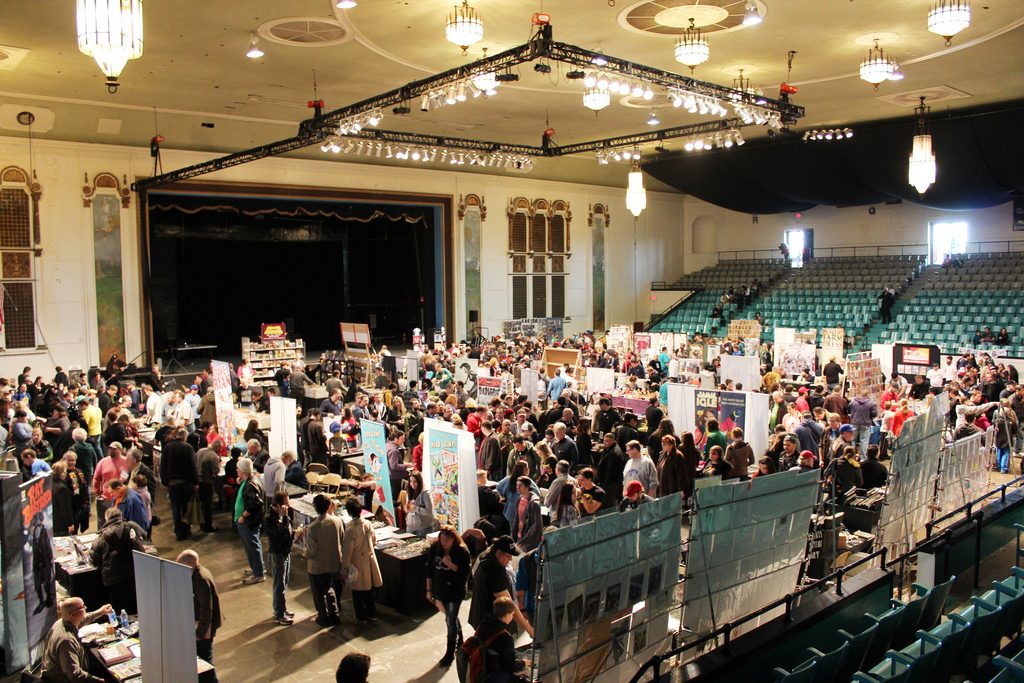
Asbury Park Comicon 3 at Asbury Park Convention Hall in Asbury Park, NJ.

The East Coast Comicon is an annual comic book fan convention that takes place in New Jersey. It began in 2011 as the Asbury Park Comicon, and took place in Asbury Park, New Jersey. Due to its expansion and the need for a larger venue, it was renamed the East Coast Comicon in 2015, and moved to the Meadowlands Exposition Center in Secaucus, New Jersey.

== History ==
The Asbury Park Comicon was founded by Cliff Galbraith of Crucial Entertainment, LLC. The show was conceived when Galbraith attended and observed crowds of people looking through cardboard boxes filled with albums. Galbraith relates, "I said, 'Who else looks through white boxes?' And a light bulb went off." Comparing his convention to the enormous crowds of the much larger New York Comic Con, which takes place in nearby Manhattan, Galbraith comments, "What we offer is a much more civilized, intimate setting. You can really spend time with the artist. You’re not hustled along." Galbraith wanted to create a convention that emphasized comics over the film and television promotions around which many of the conventions they had attended had become centered. The first show took place on May 2, 2012, at the Asbury Lanes live music and bowling venue in Asbury Park, New Jersey. The event featured guests Evan Dorkin, Sarah Dyer, Stephanie Buscema, Jamal Igle, and Steve Mannion.

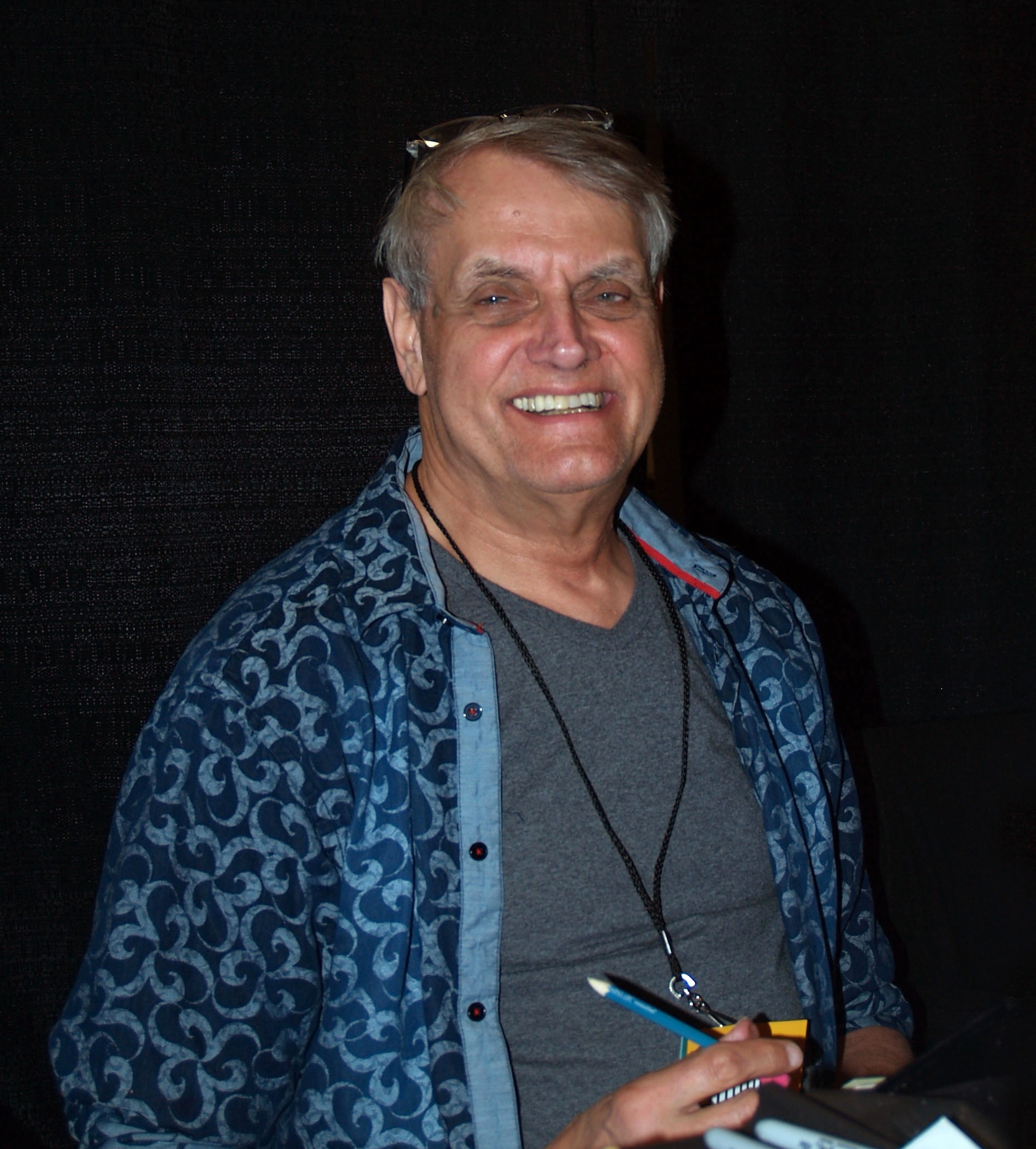
Herb Trimpe, during his last public appearance at the 2015 convention, April 11, 2015

The second Asbury Park Comicon took place on September 29, 2012, at the Asbury Lanes in Asbury Park. The event featured artists Evan Dorkin, Sarah Dyer, Dean Haspiel, and Reilly Brown.

The third Asbury Park Comicon took place on March 30, 2013, at Asbury Park Convention Hall in Asbury Park. The event featured Al Jaffee, Michael E. Uslan, Herb Trimpe, Jamal Igle, Allen Bellman, Don McGregor, Jay Lynch, Rudy Nebres, John Holmstrom, Evan Dorkin, and Bob Camp. The third Asbury Park Comicon was attended by approximately 3,800 comic book fans.

The fourth Asbury Park Comicon took place over the weekend of April 12 and 13, 2014, at the Berkeley Oceanfront Hotel in Asbury Park, New Jersey. Guests included Jim Steranko, Chris Claremont, Ann Nocenti, J.H. Williams III, Cliff Chiang, Denis Kitchen, Mark Schultz, Box Brown, Andrew Aydin, Don McGregor, Jay Lynch, and Jamal Igle.

By 2015, Galbraith realized that the Asbury Park location created too many limitations to the convention's expansion. The Meadowlands Exposition Center in Harmon Meadow Plaza in Secaucus, New Jersey would allow the organizers to increase the number of featured exhibitors to 300, provide a more convenient location to northern New Jersey and New York City, and free parking. Guests included Neal Adams, Arthur Adams, Jim Steranko, Simon Bisley, Larry Hama, John Holmstrom, Bob Camp, Ann Nocenti, Whilce Portacio, Steve Rude, Don McGregor, and Rich Buckler. Among the panel discussions was one devoted to artist Wally Wood. It was the last comics convention to feature Herb Trimpe before his death on Monday, April 13, 2015.

The 2020 convention was canceled due to the COVID-19 pandemic.
