= Cirrus Gallery =

Cirrus Gallery and Cirrus Editions Limited Publishing and Printing is an art gallery, print workshop and publishing venue in Los Angeles, California. Cirrus Gallery, which houses Cirrus Editions, was founded by Jean Milant and opened in 1970 in Hollywood, before moving to its location on Alameda Street in Downtown Los Angeles 1979. In 2015, the gallery moved to its current location, 2011 Santa Fe Ave. Notable artists whose works were shown and printed with Cirrus Editions include Peter Alexander, John Baldessari, Vija Celmins, Judy Chicago, Judy Fiskin, Craig Kauffman, Allan McCollum, Ed Moses, Bruce Nauman, Ed Ruscha, Betye Saar, Gloria Kisch, Alexis Smith, Mary Weatherford and William T. Wiley.

== Archives ==
In 1986 the Los Angeles County Museum of Art (LACMA) acquired the entire archive of artworks produced by Cirrus Editions, including etchings, lithographs, mixed media prints, screenprints, and woodcuts along with corresponding plates and woodblocks. The archive represented every single print that was editioned through Cirrus Editions. In 1995, LACMA presented 130 artworks from the archive in the exhibition titled "Made in L.A.: The Prints of Cirrus Editions" curated by Bruce Davis.
