= Weehawken School District =

School district in Hudson County, New Jersey, US

Address
- 53 Liberty Place Weehawken, Hudson County, New Jersey, 07086; United States
- Coordinates: 40.774141°N 74.018294°W

District information
- Grades: PreK–12
- Superintendent: Eric Crespo
- Business administrator: Eulalia Gillis (interim)
- Schools: 3

Students and staff
- Enrollment: 1,320 (as of 2023–24)
- Faculty: 130.6 FTEs
- Student–teacher ratio: 10.1:1
- District mascot: Indians
- Colors: Red White

Other information
- District Factor Group: CD
- Website: www.weehawkenschools.net
Ind.	Per pupil	District spending	Rank (*)	K–12 average	%± vs. average
1A	Total Spending	$19,598	36	$18,891	3.7%
1	Budgetary Cost	14,124	29	14,783	−4.5%
2	Classroom Instruction	8,371	27	8,763	−4.5%
6	Support Services	1,905	20	2,392	−20.4%
8	Administrative Cost	1,718	29	1,485	15.7%
10	Operations & Maintenance	1,487	19	1,783	−16.6%
13	Extracurricular Activities	435	25	268	62.3%
16	Median Teacher Salary	55,557	12	64,043
Data from NJDoE 2014 Taxpayers' Guide to Education Spending. *Of K–12 districts with up to 1,800 students. Lowest spending=1; Highest=49

The Weehawken School District is a comprehensive community public school district consisting of three schools serving students in pre-kindergarten through twelfth grade from the Township of Weehawken, in Hudson County, in the U.S. state of New Jersey.

As of the 2022–23 school year, the district, comprised of three schools, had an enrollment of 1,320 students and 130.6 classroom teachers (on an FTE basis), for a student–teacher ratio of 10.1:1.

The district had been classified by the New Jersey Department of Education as being in District Factor Group "CD", the sixth-highest of eight groupings. District Factor Groups organize districts statewide to allow comparison by common socioeconomic characteristics of the local districts. From lowest socioeconomic status to highest, the categories are A, B, CD, DE, FG, GH, I and J.

== Awards, recognition and rankings ==
In 2017, the International Center for Leadership in Education named Weehawken "one of the twelve most innovative districts in the nation." Niche.com ranked Weehawken 79th on its list of the top 100 school districts in New Jersey with each of the district's schools receiving an A rating. The Washington Post ranked Weehawken High School in the top 12% of all high schools in the United States—including 79th in the state and highest-ranked in Hudson County—on its 2017 list of "America’s Most Challenging High Schools."

== Schools ==
Schools in the district (with 2023–24 enrollment data from the National Center for Education Statistics) are:

Elementary schools

- Daniel Webster School with 391 students in PreK through 2nd grade
  - Amani Hassan, Principal
- Theodore Roosevelt School with 328 students in grades 3–6
  - Suzanne Mera, principal

High school

- Weehawken High School with 589 students in grades 7–12
  - Robert Ferullo, principal

== Administration ==
Core members of the district's administration are:

- Eric Crespo, superintendent of schools
- Eulalia Gillis, interim business administrator and board secretary

== Board of education ==
The district's board of education, comprised of nine members, sets policy and oversees the fiscal and educational operation of the district through its administration. As a Type II school district, the board's trustees are elected directly by voters to serve three-year terms of office on a staggered basis, with three seats up for election each year held as part of the April school election. The board appoints a superintendent to oversee the district's day-to-day operations and a business administrator to supervise the business functions of the district. Of the nearly 600 school districts statewide, Weehawken is one of approximately 12 districts with school elections in April, in which voters also decide on passage of the annual school budget.
