= Max Stern (businessman) =

German-American businessman (1898–1982)

- Born: 1898; Fulda, Hesse, Germany
- Died: May 21, 1982 (aged 83); Manhattan, New York City
- Resting place: Kensico Cemetery, Valhalla, Westchester County, New York
- Citizenship: United States
- Education: High School
- Occupation: Founder — Hartz Mountain Corporation
- Spouses: Hilda Lowenthal; Ghity Amiel Lindenbaum (m. 1950–1982)
- Children: 7, including Leonard N. Stern and Gloria Kisch
- Parents: Emanuel Stern (father); Caroline Stern (mother)

Max Stern (1898 – May 21, 1982) was an American businessman, investor, and philanthropist who established and built the Hartz Mountain Corporation.

== Early life and education ==
He was born to a Jewish family in Fulda, Hesse, Germany, to parents Emanuel and Caroline Stern. He emigrated to the United States in 1926 fleeing the religious prejudice that he experienced in Germany.

== Career ==
Stern founded the Hartz Mountain Corporation, a large pet products manufacturer and real estate development company. Stern was also the leader of Yeshiva University for 41 years.

== Personal life ==
Stern was twice-married:

- His first wife was Hilda Lowenthal (born 1922 in Eschwege, Germany) who emigrated to New York in 1935. The couple had three children: Stanley, Leonard, and Gloria. All were reared in the Jewish tradition.
- In 1950, he married Ghity Lindenbaum (née Amiel). They remained married until Max's death in 1982. Ghity was born into a Jewish family in Lithuania where she married her first husband, Nathan Lindenbaum in 1928. They had four children: Marcel, Maidy, Henry, and Armand. In 1940, fleeing Nazi Germany, the family emigrated to the United States settling in New York City. Nathan died in 1946. Her father, Moshe Avigdor Amiel, was chief rabbi in Antwerp, Belgium, and later became the chief rabbi of Tel Aviv.

=== Philanthropy ===
A philanthropist, Stern helped many charitable organizations both in the U.S. and Israel; often with connections to Jewish causes.

Stern founded the Stern College for Women — the undergraduate women's college of arts and sciences of Yeshiva University, located in New York City, New York, which is associated with Modern Orthodox Judaism — with a major grant, in honor of his late parents Emanuel and Caroline Stern.

The Max Stern Academic College of Emek Yezreel, located in Jezreel Valley, Israel, is named after him.

=== Religion ===
Stern was a communal lay leader. He was for a time president of the advisory council to the New York Board of Rabbis.

== Death ==
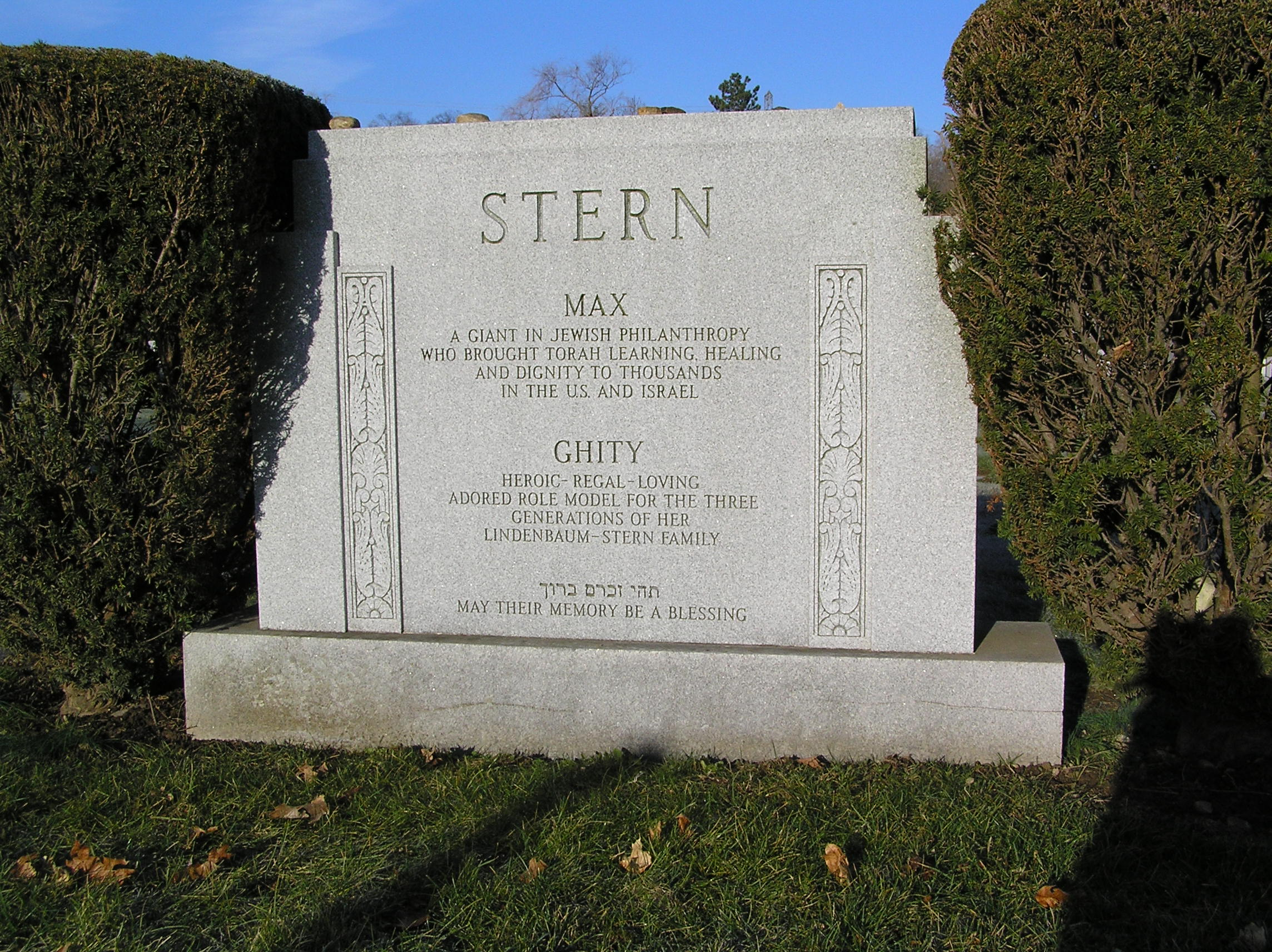
The headstone of Max Stern

He died in 1982 at the age 83, leaving his son, Leonard N. Stern, to carry on the family business. He is interred in the Sharon Gardens Division of Kensico Cemetery.
