= Lori Majewski =

U.S.-based entertainment writer

Lori Majewski is a U.S.-based entertainment writer. She is the author (with Jonathan Bernstein) of Mad World: An Oral History of New Wave Artists and Songs that Defined the 1980s. Since 2016, she has been an on-air personality at the SiriusXM music talk radio channel Volume.

== Personal background ==
Majewski grew up in Weehawken, New Jersey, United States, and attended Weehawken High School, which in the 2010s inducted her into its Academic Hall of Fame. She attended college at Fordham University's Lincoln Center campus between 1989 and 1993, and wrote for The Fordham Observer. She currently resides in Weehawken and Olive, New York.

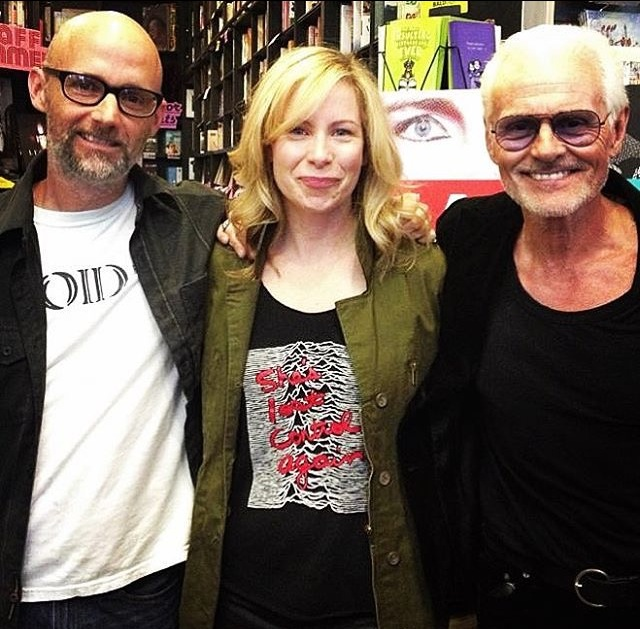
Majewski at a 2014 Los Angeles book launch for Mad World, flanked by Moby and Michael Des Barres

== Relationship to Duran Duran ==
Majewski has been a fan of the new wave group Duran Duran since hearing them in the early 1980s. She credits the band for her career in writing, claiming, "in the mid-'80s I decided I wanted to become a journalist so I could meet them." In 1990, after the official Duran Duran fan club folded, Majewski created the quarterly fanzine Too Much Information: The Definitive Duranzine, which she published through 1995.

== Publishing career ==
From 1991 to 1994 Majewski interned at Spin magazine. Her first paid job as a magazine staff writer came at YM, a publication targeted at teen girls. In 1998, Majewski was a co-founder of Teen People, the print offshoot of the Time Inc. magazine People. After leaving the periodical in 2001 to become executive editor of US Weekly, she returned to Teen People in 2005 to serve as managing editor. Teen People ceased publication in September 2006. Majewski then served as executive editor at Entertainment Weekly through 2008.

== Mad World ==
In 2014, Lori Majewski and Jonathan Bernstein wrote Mad World: An Oral History of New Wave Artists and Songs that Defined the 1980s, with a foreword by Nick Rhodes of Duran Duran and an afterword by Moby. The book collects new interviews with the recording artists of 35 famous new wave songs, focusing on the stories behind the song's origins and the aftermath of the songs' popularity. Majewski and Bernstein hatched the idea for Mad World while writing for Spin during the 1990s heyday of grunge, where they discovered their mutual love for new wave music.
