= Gloria Kisch =

American artist (1941–2014)

- Born: 1941; New York City
- Died: 2014 (aged 72–73)

Gloria Kisch (1941–2014) was an American artist and sculptor known especially for her early post-Minimalist paintings and wall sculptures, and her later large-scale work in metal.

== Early life and education ==
Born in New York City in 1941 to the German immigrants Max and Hilda Stern, Gloria initially completed an undergraduate degree at Sarah Lawrence College in 1963, before leaving for California, where she would spend the next two and a half decades of her life.

== Time in California ==
In 1963, Kisch enrolled at the Otis College of Art and Design, Los Angeles, where she studied alongside artists such as Bas Jan Ader and Barry Le Va, earning a BFA and completing her MFA in 1969. While at Otis she embarked on a series of hard-edge paintings, described by the critic Naomi Baker in the San Diego Evening Tribune as "geometric paintings, vivid and sharply defined with color areas and shapes."

Beginning in 1971, while living in Venice Beach, Kisch's work became increasingly sculptural, described by the critic Melinda Terbell Wortz in Artweek in 1974 as "more like wall sculptures than paintings." Her early sculptures were in a post-Minimalist vein and were compared to works by her contemporaries Eva Hesse and Bruce Nauman.

In the 1970s, Kisch taught and exhibited her work at the newly founded cooperative gallery Womanspace in the non-profit arts and education center The Woman’s Building established by artist Judy Chicago, designer Sheila Levant de Bretteville, and critic Arlene Raven at Otis College in Los Angeles. There, Kisch’s work was included in the exhibitions Open Invitational and Female Sexuality, and in 1977, she led an extension program in sculpture. In 1973, Suzanne Saxe Gallery in San Francisco presented a solo exhibition of Kisch's work in which she displayed hanging, leaning, or suspended groups and pairings of “totems”, bamboo segments she had wrapped and coated in silicone, plaster, sand, paint and other substances which suggested the "powerful presence of ritualistic objects." That same year, she debuted 'Wall Pieces' at the Newport Harbor Art Museum (now the Orange County Museum of Art). During this period, Kisch’s work was also shown at various college and university art galleries in California, including Santa Monica College where she exhibited alongside Betye Saar, Judy Chicago, Claire Falkenstein, and Ynez Johnston, and at the University of California Irvine where Kisch installed her first large-scale outdoor sculpture, ‘Double Zero.’ In 1977, Kisch created an environmental installation for her solo exhibition, ‘The Tomb’, organized by the gallery at California State University, Los Angeles. Beginning in 1975, Kisch began showing regularly at Cirrus gallery, an influential gallery and print publishing workshop in Los Angeles. In 1977, Kisch produced prints with the workshop’s master printmaker Jean Milant, which were exhibited in ‘Made in LA; The Prints of Cirrus Editions’ at LACMA. These prints are in the collections of museums throughout the U.S. In 1976, she had her first international solo show in Paris at Stevenson Palluel and was a participant in the Biennale of Sydney.

In 1978 Kisch was included in a landmark group exhibition organized by Southern Exposure at San Francisco's Stephen Wirtz Gallery. Among the other artists shown were John McCracken, Judy Chicago, Bruce Nauman, Ed Ruscha, Kenneth Price, Richard Diebenkorn, and Edward Kienholz. That same year, she also had a solo exhibition at the Los Angeles Institute of Contemporary Art titled 'Zeu.' She had her first New York solo show, of The Chimes Series (originally presented at Janus Gallery in Venice, California) at the Touchstone Gallery in 1979. These large-scale as well as tabletop sculptures were formed from rocks Kisch gathered and affixed to the tops of vertical steel rods arranged to suggest the rocks’ potential to create sound, highlighting the energy latent in their form.

Curated by Alanna Heiss, in 1980 Kisch’s work was included in a Special Projects Exhibition at New York's Institute for Art and Urban Resources, P.S.1 (now MoMA PS1).

Kisch was named a leading artist in the 1980 ARTnews article covering the Venice California art scene, and was featured in the film Contemporary Artists At Work: Sculptors, a Harcourt Brace and Jovanich film alongside John Chamberlain, Fred Eversley, and John McCracken.

== Return to New York ==
In 1981, Kisch returned to New York City, working briefly on Leonard Street before relocating to Broadway, where she was among the artists moving into converted Soho lofts. She built a studio on the first floor "because of the need to use heavy and bulky material." This same year, The Milwaukee Art Museum exhibited The Leonard Street Series, a group of sixteen large drawings made in oil stick and white gesso inspired by New York City. Following her Milwaukee exhibition, in 1983 Kisch presented The Gateway Series at the Queens Museum and at 55 Mercer Street.

=== Functional sculpture ===
Kisch began sculpting almost exclusively with metal in the early 1980s, due in part because metal would give her art a “longer life.” Kisch embarked on "functional sculptures," objects and furnishings that blurred the line between art and design. She exhibited these works at the pioneering Soho gallery Art et Industrie. Of her approach to making functional sculpture, Kisch said, “I have eased into functional art, its duality offers a resolution for some of my ideas. Wrapping my fantasies around a preconceived utilitarian object is the basis for this dichotomy.” The art critic Rose Slivka noted that Kisch’s furniture forms ‘look as if they are gloating with the secret of their own utility.'

In 1988, Kisch’s figurative sculpture ‘Comrades’ was included in the exhibition The Legacy of Surrealism in Contemporary Art at the Ben Shahn Galleries at William Paterson College.

In 1991, Kisch began residing on Long Island. In 2000, she constructed a studio with metalworking and welding workshops on a 40-acre converted duck farm in Flanders, Riverhead, Long Island that she called Three Ponds. Here Kisch began to incorporate elements of nature into her sculpture. “I live by nature and I am inspired by nature.” She began a series of large-scale steel sculptures evoking pond reeds, and later, her well-known free-standing as well as wall-mounted metal flower forms emerged. During this period, Kisch also began her ‘Bells’, stainless steel mobiles conjuring temple bells, chandeliers, and wind chimes, some emitting sound if struck or moved. She worked prolifically at Three Ponds until her death in 2014.

Kisch was included in the 1993 exhibition Art and Application at Turbulence Gallery in New York along with artists such as Vito Acconci, John Chamberlain, Richard Artschwager, Michele Oka Doner, Dennis Oppenheim, and Haim Steinbach among others. In 2007, she had a notable two-person show with sculptor Dale Chihuly at the Vered Gallery in East Hampton, NY, where she exhibited her Flowers series. In 2009, American Image Books published the monograph Gloria Kisch: Fusion of Opposites, showcasing her sculptural work and in 2010 her work was presented in a solo exhibition at Guild Hall in East Hampton, NY. In 2014, Kisch’s flower sculptures were included in an exhibition at the Nassau County Museum of Art.

== Public art ==
Kisch's large scale sculptural work has been featured in sites for public art. In 1987, Kisch's sculpture Big Apple Christmas Tree was installed in the Robert Moses Plaza at Lincoln Center. Her monumental steel sculpture Octopus II was exhibited in 2002 in Dag Hammarskjold Plaza, followed by a presentation of her sculpture Copper Fusion in 2010–11; both installations were organized by the City of New York and the Department of Parks and Recreation. In 2008, Kisch installed ‘Nagas’ on the rooftop terrace of the San Angelo Museum of Fine Arts.

== Kisch's views on art ==
Throughout her life, Kisch traveled and read widely, and was inspired by various cultural traditions, religious art and objects. As she stated to Barbara Wilson in an interview in Current Magazine in 1975–76: "I'm interested in the esthetic quality of eternal timelessness, in ancient art—Greek, Egyptian, and Indian—that seems never outdated." She considered her art to be “spiritual in content,” noting that through the dissonance and harmony present in her sculptures, “I strive to create a place to elate the spirit.” She professed an interest in the curative power of art, stating "For a society which has lost its connection with the reasons for human existence, Art serves to reinstate what is important...Art acts as a reminder of eternal values which have served mankind always. Therefore, Art today acts as a curing agent. When we are convinced by Art our values are set straight again. Art cures by reinforcing the importance of our individual songs."

== Personal life ==
Kisch had two children and two grandchildren.

== Posthumous reception ==
Following Kisch's death in 2014, there has been renewed interest in her work. A catalogue of her sculptures, Immortal Flowers, was published by dieFirma and bookdummypress in 2019 in conjunction with an exhibition of her work at dieFirma's New York gallery. Since 2021, Kisch's work has been presented by Salon 94.

== Public collections ==
Kisch's works are in the collections of many institutions in the U.S. and abroad:

Virginia Museum of Fine Arts, Richmond, Virginia

Los Angeles County Museum of Art, Los Angeles, California

Newport Harbor Art Museum, Newport Beach, California

Milwaukee Art Museum, Milwaukee, Wisconsin

Palm Springs Art Museum, Palm Springs, California

Aldrich Museum of Contemporary Art, Ridgefield, Connecticut

Otis Art Institute, Los Angeles, California

Downey Museum Of Art, Downey, California

Centrum Sztuki Współczesnej, Warsaw, Poland

Neuberger Museum, Purchase, New York

Bergen Museum of Art, Paramus, New Jersey

Mildura Arts Centre, Mildura, Australia

Denver Art Museum, Denver, Colorado

San Angelo Museum of Fine Arts, San Angelo, Texas

The Jewish Museum, New York, New York

The Art Institute of Chicago, Chicago, Illinois

The Frances Lehman Loeb Art Center, Vassar College, Poughkeepsie, New York
