= Secaucus High School =

High school in Hudson County, New Jersey, US

Location
- 11 Millridge Road; Secaucus, Hudson County, New Jersey 07094; United States; 40.801948°N 74.050333°W

Information
- Type: Public high school
- Motto: Home of the Patriots
- Established: September 1976
- School district: Secaucus Board of Education
- NCES School ID: 341485002900
- Principal: Steve Viggiani
- Faculty: 56.8 FTEs
- Grades: 9-12
- Enrollment: 612 (as of 2024–25)
- Student to teacher ratio: 10.8:1
- Colors: Scarlet; White and Blue
- Athletics conference: North Jersey Interscholastic Conference (general); North Jersey Super Football Conference (football)
- Team name: Patriots
- Rival: Lyndhurst High School
- Accreditation: Middle States Association of Colleges and Schools
- Newspaper: The Patriot Press
- Website: shs.sboe.org/o/shs

Secaucus High School is a four-year comprehensive public high school that serves students in ninth through twelfth grade from Secaucus, in Hudson County, in the U.S. state of New Jersey, operating as the lone secondary school of the Secaucus Board of Education. The school has been accredited by the Middle States Association of Colleges and Schools Commission on Elementary and Secondary Schools.The school building is shared with Secaucus Middle School, also a high-ranked school in the area.

As of the 2024–25 school year, the school had an enrollment of 612 students and 56.8 classroom teachers (on an FTE basis), for a student–teacher ratio of 10.8:1. There were 223 students (36.4% of enrollment) eligible for free lunch and 31 (5.1% of students) eligible for reduced-cost lunch.

== History ==
The high school opened in September 1976, before which students from Secaucus attended Weehawken High School as part of a sending/receiving relationship. The new school facility was constructed at a cost of $7.8 million (equivalent to $46.7 million in 2025).

== Campus ==
Secaucus High School is located in a secluded area of North End, Secaucus. Secaucus High School campus has an estimated total area of 1,000,000 square feet (93,000 m^{2}), the largest in Hudson County and one of the largest in the New York metropolitan area. The school was built on marsh land, completed in 1976 and able to hold up about 1,000 students. The campus includes a track, a football field, 5 tennis courts, two baseball fields, 2 small soccer fields (one of them demolished to make room for renovations), and three parking lots, one of them for senior parking spots. In 2004, the school had an addition of the Arthur F. Couch Performing Arts Center, with seating for 1,000 and a band and chorus room. In 2016, in order to provide space for a full middle school in the building, an addition included new classrooms, new media center, renovated building and track, new offices and a new gym, constructed at an estimated cost of $27 million dollars.

== Awards, recognition and rankings ==
The school was the 155th-ranked public high school in New Jersey out of 339 schools statewide in New Jersey Monthly magazine's September 2014 cover story on the state's "Top Public High Schools", using a new ranking methodology. The school had been ranked 90th in the state of 328 schools in 2012, after being ranked 102nd in 2010 out of 322 schools listed. The magazine ranked the school 103rd in 2008 out of 316 schools. The school was ranked 107th in the magazine's September 2006 issue, which surveyed 316 schools across the state. Schooldigger.com ranked the school 215th out of 376 public high schools statewide in its 2010 rankings (a decrease of 34 positions from the 2009 rank) which were based on the combined percentage of students classified as proficient or above proficient on the language arts literacy and mathematics components of the High School Proficiency Assessment (HSPA). In 2017, the school was ranked #71 in New Jersey and earned a silver medal in the U.S. News & World Report rankings of Best High Schools.

== Athletics ==
The Secaucus High School Patriots participate in the North Jersey Interscholastic Conference, which is comprised of small-enrollment schools in Bergen, Hudson, Morris and Passaic counties, and was established following a reorganization of sports leagues in Northern New Jersey by the New Jersey State Interscholastic Athletic Association (NJSIAA). Prior to the realignment that took effect in the fall of 2010, Secaucus was a member of the Bergen County Scholastic League (BCSL) National Division. With 493 students in grades 10-12, the school was classified by the NJSIAA for the 2019–20 school year as Group II for most athletic competition purposes, which included schools with an enrollment of 486 to 758 students in that grade range. The football team competes in the United White division of the North Jersey Super Football Conference, which includes 112 schools competing in 20 divisions, making it the nation's biggest football-only high school sports league. The school was classified by the NJSIAA as Group I North for football for 2024–2026, which included schools with 254 to 474 students. The school participates with North Arlington High School in a joint ice hockey team in which Kearny High School is the host school / lead agency. The co-op program operates under agreements scheduled to expire at the end of the 2023–24 school year.

The baseball team won the Group I state championship in 1980, defeating Monroe Township High School by a score of 6-0 in the final game of the tournament.

The girls volleyball team won the Group II state championship in 1983 (defeating Tenafly High School in the tournament's final match), 1984 (vs. Fort Lee High School), 1985 (vs. Hawthorne High School) and 1986 (vs. Hawthorne), won the Group I title in 1988 (vs. Emerson Junior-Senior High School), 1989 (vs. Wood-Ridge High School), 1991 (vs. Wallington High School), 1992 (vs. Eastern Christian High School), 1993 (vs. Bogota High School), 1995 (vs. Wallington), 1996 (vs. Emerson), 1997 (vs. Boogota), 1998 (vs. Bogota), 1999 (vs. Cresskill High School), 2000 (vs. Bogota), 2001 (vs. Cresskill), 2005 (vs. Bogota), 2006 (vs. Midland Park High School) and 2014 (vs. Bogota). The program's 19 state group titles are the most in the state. The 1983 team won the program's first state title, defeating Park Ridge in two games (15-8 and 15-12) in the finals of the Group II tournament. After losing in the first game and trailing in the third, the 1984 came back to win the Group II state title against Fort Lee in three games (14-16. 15-2, 15-11). The 1985 team won their third straight Group II title with a 15-9, 15-9 win against Hawthorne in the finals to finish the season at 22-0. In an upset of the number-one seed, the 1986 team finished with a 19-3 record after defeating Hawthorne in two games (15-6 and 15-11). The team won the 2000 Group I state championship over Bogota High School, dropping the first set by a score of 10-15 and then winning the final 15-13 and 15–9. The 2001 team repeated with a win over Cresskill High School in the tournament final. The team took the title in 2005 with a 25–20, 25-18 straight set win over Bogota High School. The 2006 team repeated as Group I champion with a 25–13, 25–12 win in the finals against Midland Park. In 2014, the team beat Bogota 25-22 and 25-15 in the Group I title match to win the program's 19th state championship.

The 2013 softball team won the North II Group I sectional championship, the program's first, defeating defending state champion Whippany Park High School by a score of 1–0.

The 2019 softball team won the Hudson County Tournament after defeating Bayonne High School by a score of 5–4 in the tournament final.

In 2023, the girls volleyball team won the Hudson County title.

In 2024, the girls' volleyball team won the Hudson County title once again, as well as winning North I Group II finals. They also became the first girls volleyball program to win over 1,000 games in the state of New Jersey.

== Notable alumni ==
- Jeff Bittiger (born 1962, class of 1980), former pitcher who played four MLB seasons for the Philadelphia Phillies, Minnesota Twins and Chicago White Sox.
- Mark Lukasiewicz (born 1973, class of 1991), former MLB pitcher who played two seasons for the Anaheim Angels.
- Seven Volpone (born 1972), entrepreneur, business executive, singer, songwriter and record producer.

== Notable faculty ==
- Anthony Impreveduto (1948-2009), a teacher who was the chairman of the school's business department as well as a member of the New Jersey General Assembly from 1987 to 2004.

== Administration ==
The school's principal is Steve Viggiani. Core members of his administration include the assistant principal.
