= Secaucus Public Schools =

School district in Hudson County, New Jersey, US

Address
- 685 5th Street Secaucus, Hudson County, New Jersey, 07094; United States
- Coordinates: 40.788239°N 74.054993°W

District information
- Grades: PreK-12
- Superintendent: Charles Voorhees (acting)
- Business administrator: Grace Yeo
- Schools: 5

Students and staff
- Enrollment: 2,229 (as of 2020–21)
- Faculty: 187.5 FTEs
- Student–teacher ratio: 11.9:1

Other information
- District Factor Group: DE
- Website: www.sboe.org
Ind.	Per pupil	District spending	Rank (*)	K-12 average	%± vs. average
1A	Total Spending	$18,209	38	$18,891	−3.6%
1	Budgetary Cost	14,921	51	14,783	0.9%
2	Classroom Instruction	8,536	45	8,763	−2.6%
6	Support Services	1,630	7	2,392	−31.9%
8	Administrative Cost	1,965	66	1,485	32.3%
10	Operations & Maintenance	1,817	51	1,783	1.9%
13	Extracurricular Activities	461	51	268	72.0%
16	Median Teacher Salary	63,085	33	64,043
Data from NJDoE 2014 Taxpayers' Guide to Education Spending. *Of K-12 districts with 1,800-3,500 students. Lowest spending=1; Highest=68

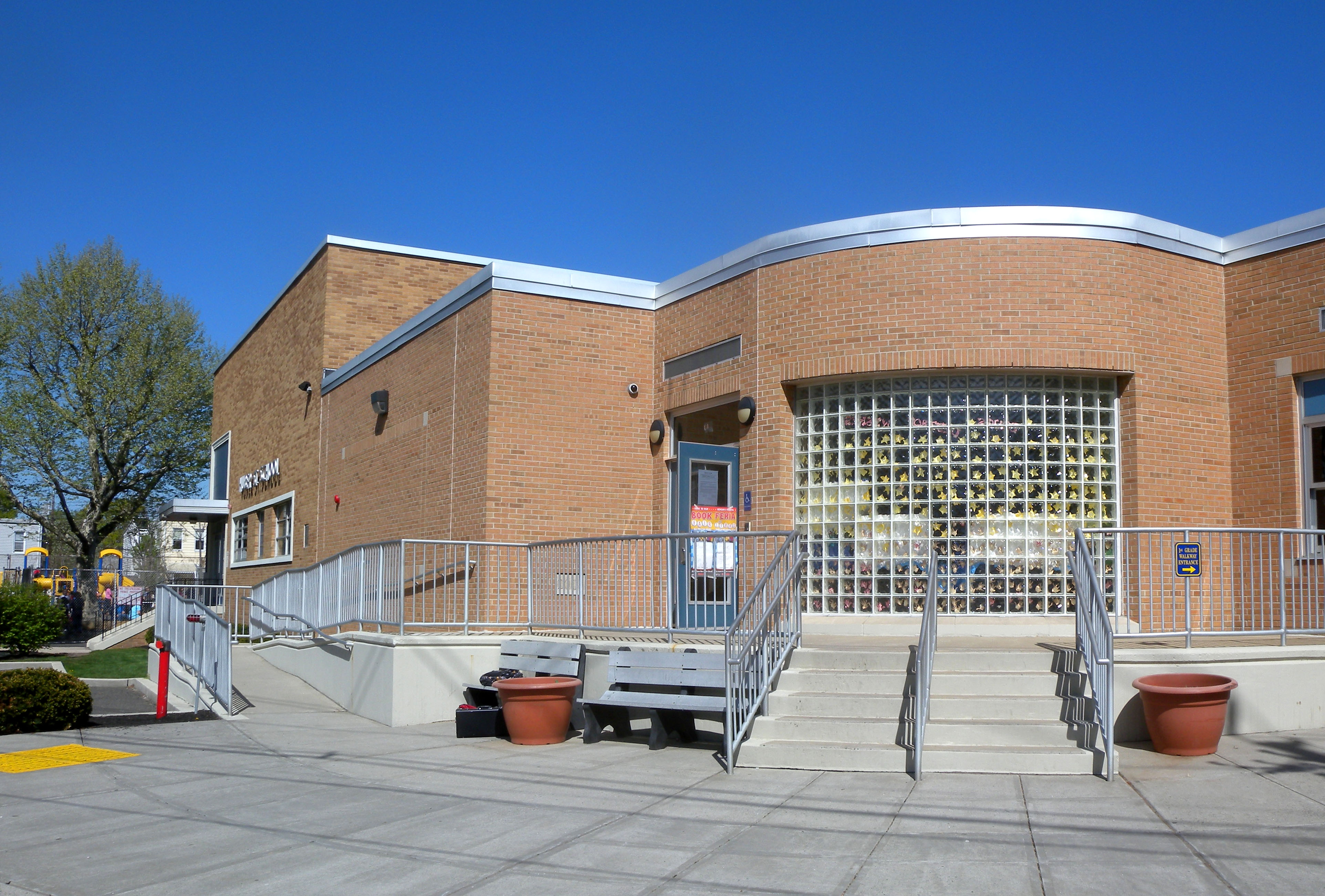
Huber Street School

The Secaucus Public Schools is a public school district that serves students in pre-kindergarten through twelfth grade from Secaucus, in Hudson County, in the U.S. state of New Jersey.

As of the 2025–26 school year, the district, comprising four schools, had an enrollment of 2,144 students and 189.5 classroom teachers (on an FTE basis), for a student–teacher ratio of 11.314:1.

The district is classified by the New Jersey Department of Education as being in District Factor Group "DE", the fifth-highest of eight groupings. District Factor Groups organize districts statewide to allow comparison by common socioeconomic characteristics of the local districts. From lowest socioeconomic status to highest, the categories are A, B, CD, DE, FG, GH, I and J.

== Schools ==
Schools in the district (with 2020–21 enrollment data from the National Center for Education Statistics) are:

Pre-Kindergarten

- Millridge School / Early Learning Center serving PreK
  - Robert Valente, principal

Elementary schools

- Clarendon Elementary School with 470 students in grades K-5
  - Christine Candela, principal
- Huber Street Elementary School with 635 students in grades PreK-5
  - Robert Valente, principal

Middle school

- Secaucus Middle School with 514 students in grades 6–8
  - Danielle Garzon, principal

High school

- Secaucus High School with 594 students in grades 9–12
  - Steven Viggiani, principal

== Administration ==
Core members of the district's administration are:

- Charles Voorhees, acting Superintendent of schools; he was appointed on an interim basis in April 2014 to succeed Erick Alfonso, who has been placed on administrative lead the previous month by the board without explanation to the public.
- Grace Yeo, business administrator and board secretary

== Board of education ==
The district's board of education, comprised of nine members, sets policy and oversees the fiscal and educational operation of the district through its administration. As a Type II school district, the board's trustees are elected directly by voters to serve three-year terms of office on a staggered basis, with three seats up for election each year held (since 2015) as part of the November general election. The board appoints a superintendent to oversee the district's day-to-day operations and a business administrator to supervise the business aspects of the district.
