= Jean Milant =

American printmaker (1943–2024)

Jean Milant (1943 – December 30, 2024) was an American master printmaker known for establishing Cirrus Editions in Los Angeles. He received his training at the Tamarind Institute.

== Life and career ==
Milant was born in 1943. His work is in the Amon Carter Museum of American Art, the Los Angeles County Museum of Art, the National Gallery of Art, the Norton Simon Museum, and the Smithsonian American Art Museum. In 1995 the Los Angeles County Museum of Art held a 25th anniversary show of Cirrus Editions entitled Made in L.A.: The Prints of Cirrus Editions.

Milant died on December 30, 2024, at the age of 81.
