= Leonard N. Stern =

American billionaire businessman

Leonard Stern
- Born: Leonard Norman Stern; March 28, 1938 (age 88); New York City, US
- Education: New York University (BA)
- Occupations: Chairman and CEO, Hartz Mountain Industries
- Spouses: Judith Stern Peck (divorced): Allison Maher
- Children: 3

Leonard Norman Stern (born March 28, 1938) is an American billionaire businessman, and philanthropist.

He is the chairman and CEO of the privately owned Hartz Group based in New York City. The company's real estate portfolio was owned and operated under its Hartz Mountain Industries subsidiary company, of which he is also chairman and CEO.

== Early life and education ==
Stern was born to a Jewish family, the son of Hilda (née Lowenthal) and Max Stern.

Max emigrated from Weimar Germany to the U.S. in the 1920s after his textile business proved unprofitable. Max Stern was vice-chairman of the board of trustees of Yeshiva University for whom its Stern College for Women was named.

In 1957, Stern graduated from New York University (NYU). Stern initially inherited his wealth from his father.

== Career ==
Max brought ~2,100 canaries from Germany to sell on the U.S. market. By selling caged birds, bird cages and other pet bird supplies to U.S. pet owners through Woolworth's stores over the next thirty years, Stern's father built up the family business: Hartz Mountain Corporation (HMC), headquartered in Secaucus, NJ.

HMC later grew to become the flagship subsidiary of The Hartz Group. The business was named after the Harz Mountains of Germany. Though canaries originally come from the Canary Islands the canaries in trade are the result of selective breeding by farms located at Harz.

Leonard Stern took over the family business Hartz Mountain Pet Company from his father in 1959. He gradually purchased his brother's and sister's share of the family business, Hartz Mountain, and by the early 1960s, exercised absolute control of Hartz Mountain Corporation (HMC).

Hartz Mountain Corporation then began to capture the pet supply market that catered to both dog and cat owners and parakeet and canary owners. By 1984, Hartz Mountain Corporation (HMC) controlled 75% to 90% of the U.S. market for most U.S. pet supply goods. Its pet supply business was estimated to be worth $400 million and was earning $40 million in annual profits. By the early 1980s, he had expanded the company's focus beyond pet foods to make it America's leading pet supply manufacturer and name brand.

In the mid-1980s Leonard Stern bought the New York City weekly alternative newspaper The Village Voice. Additional alternative weeklies were also purchased, forming Stern Publishing, which was sold in 2000 to a venture capital group.

=== Legal and image problems ===
According to the unsigned cover article, "Dynasty in Distress" in the February 9, 2004 issue of Business Week, Stern was "intensely engaged" as a board member of Rite Aid in the mid-to-late '90s when the drugstore chain admitted to overstating net income by $1 billion over two years.

Stern was named in several class action suits in which investors claimed that he and other directors had breached their fiduciary duty to shareholders. A separate lawsuit, filed by Kevin Mann, the son of the original founder and former executive vice-president, alleged that Stern used his influence to increase shelf space in Rite Aid stores for Hartz's pet products at the expense of competitors. Rite Aid settled that suit in 1999 for $11 million.

Stern resigned from the board in late 2001. According to the article, he "brushes all of this aside: 'We saved that company from bankruptcy. We threw out the old management and brought in the new and set it on its turnaround'".

== Philanthropy ==
Stern made a $30 million donation to the then named New York University College of Business and Public Administration and the Graduate School of Business Administration, resulting in the creation of the New York University Stern School of Business. He has continued supporting New York University, and made an additional $50 million donation to NYU Stern to support undergraduate scholarships in 2021.

He was the founder in 1986 and is chairman of Homes for the Homeless. According to its website, it serves over 630 homeless families and over 1,200 homeless children each day at five separate sites across New York City.

Stern collected Cycladic antiquities in the 1980s–now under custodianship of the Hellenic Ancient Culture Institute, lending objects to the Metropolitan Museum of Art and to the Museum of Cycladic Art in Athens.

== Personal life ==
Stern has been married twice:

- Judith Stern Peck, is a family therapist and family business consultant in New York. They divorced in 1980 and she later remarried to Stephen M. Peck. They had three children:
  - Emanuel T. Stern ("Manny") (b. 1964): runs the family's real estate business and known for losing a $1.3 billion deal to redevelop a sports and entertainment complex at New Jersey's Meadowlands Sports Complex. In 1992, he married Elizabeth Egan in a service held at the Central Park Zoo.
  - Edward J. Stern (b. 1966), who ran the Canary Capital Partners LLC hedge fund and was the first fund manager to be charged by New York Attorney General Eliot Spitzer for "fraudulent" late trading and market timing of mutual funds. In 1991, he married Stephanie Beth Rein in a Jewish service at the New York Botanical Garden.
  - Andrea C. Stern (b. 1968) is a photographer.
- Allison Maher, a former model and TV producer who grew up "dirt-poor" in Kentucky. They married in 1987. Allison is a trustee and vice-chairman of the Wildlife Conservation Society, the parent of the Bronx Zoo.

Forbes listed him with a net worth of $4.8 billion in 2018, making him the 143rd richest person in the USA, and with a net worth at $8.1 billion in 2024, making him as the 325th richest person in the world.

New York University's business school is named after him.

== See also ==
- 2003 mutual fund scandal
- List of billionaires
