= The Plaza at Harmon Meadow =

Shopping complex in New Jersey, US

Coordinates: 40.79°N 74.047°W

The Plaza at Harmon Meadow

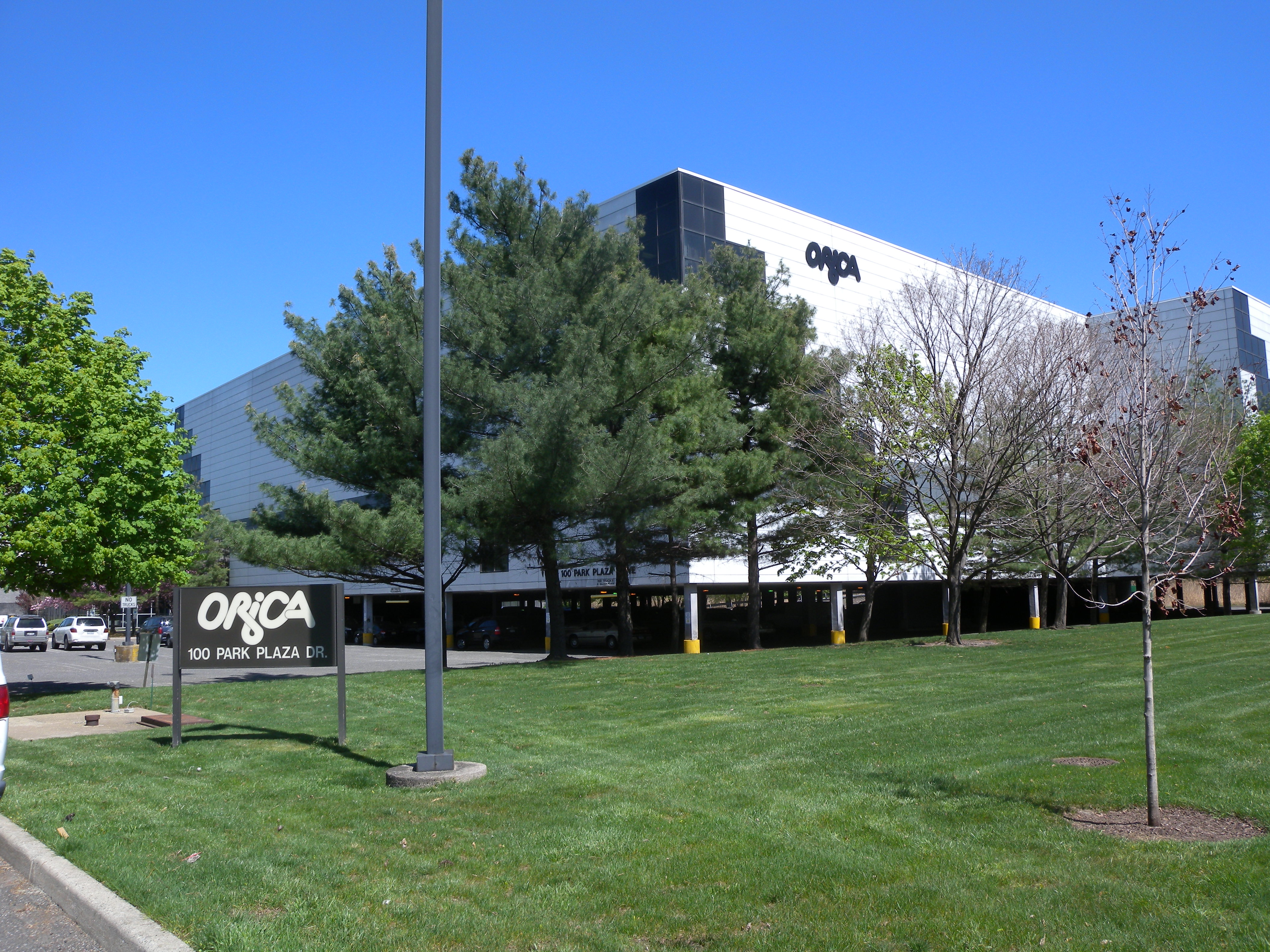
A wholesaler in Harmon Meadow

The Plaza at Harmon Meadow is a shopping complex in the Meadowlands of Secaucus, New Jersey, approximately six miles from New York City. It was developed by Hartz Mountain Industries, whose corporate offices are located in the Plaza. The Plaza, which Hartz refers to as a “mixed-use community”, encompasses 175 acres (0.71 km^{2}), and consists of over 3,500,000 square feet (330,000 m^{2}) of hotel, office, retail, and restaurants space. It was purchased by Howard Michaels's Carlton Group in 2015. It was built in 1981.

The Plaza at Harmon Meadow offers a gross leasable area of 400,000 square feet (37,000 m^{2}) of shopping. The complex also includes the Meadowlands Convention Center, which includes 61,000-square-foot (5,700 m^{2}) of exhibition space. There is a 14-screen Showplace Theatres, which opened in October 2009. Other shopping options in the mall are a Walmart and Sam's Club located east of the New Jersey Turnpike, near Route 3 and Interchange 16E, and a Best Buy. There are several hotels with a total of 1,200 rooms located throughout the complex.

The Plaza at Harmon Meadow is bound on the south by Route 3 and Paterson Plank Road. The mall is accessible via the bus lines 78 from Newark, 85 from New Jersey (Jersey City and Union City), and the 190 and 320 interstate bus lines, which travel to and from the Port Authority Bus Terminal in Midtown Manhattan.

From June 30 to July 1, 2012, it was host to BronyCon, a fan based convention for the television program My Little Pony: Friendship is Magic.

In 2015, the Meadowlands Exposition Center, which is located in the Plaza, became the hosting location for the East Coast Comicon, having moved there from Asbury Park.
