= Hartz Mountain Industries =

American real estate company

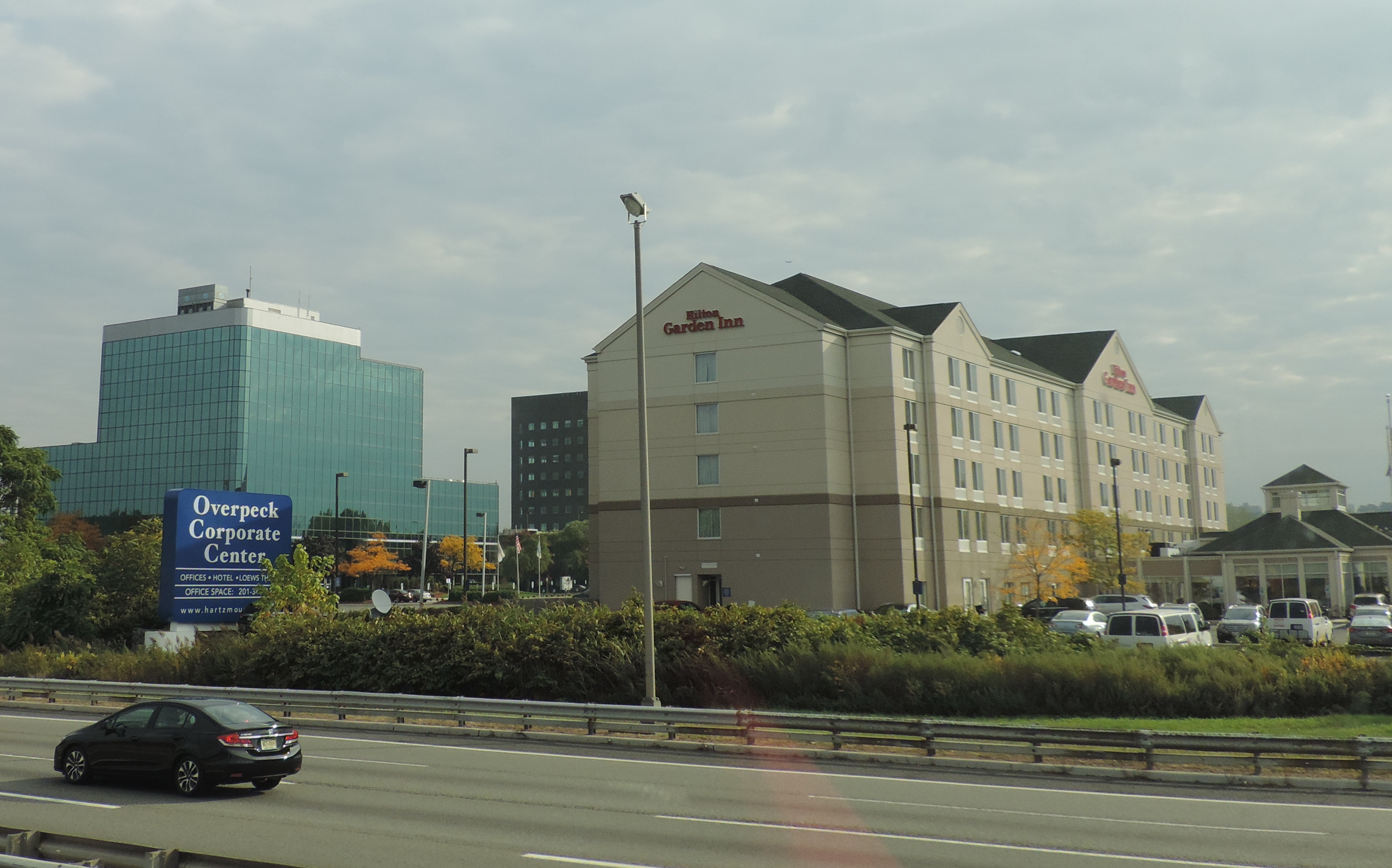
A Hartz Mountain property in Ridgefield Park, New Jersey

Hartz Mountain Industries (HMI) is a private family-owned-and-operated company known for its real estate holdings in the New York/New Jersey Metropolitan Area. Its former parent company, Hartz Mountain Corporation, which is notable for its pet products, was founded by businessmen Max Stern and Gustav Stern. Leonard N. Stern is the owner, chairman, and CEO. It is based at 500 Plaza Drive in Secaucus, New Jersey, within The Plaza at Harmon Meadow retail shopping complex in the Meadowlands.

== History ==
Max and Gustav Stern emigrated from Germany to the United States in 1926 with five thousand singing canaries (Harz Roller), and began manufacturing bird food under the Hartz Mountain brand in 1932. They later sold pets such as canaries, parakeets, hamsters, tropical fish, and associated supplies throughout the U.S. and Canada, and eventually introduced pet supply departments into supermarkets in North America and the United Kingdom.

Known as Hartz Mountain Corporation (HMC), this pet products side of the Hartz empire, which had been owned and operated by the Stern family for 75 years, was sold to investment group J.W. Childs along with select HMC management in 2000, although for goodwill purposes it still retains the HMC name. HMC's new owners opted to retain its longtime Secaucus offices, so that HMC is now a tenant of the owners of the building, Hartz Mountain Industries (HMI). HMC was sold to the Sumitomo Corporation of Japan in 2004. In December 2011, the Japanese pet and household products maker Unicharm acquired 51% ownership of HMC from Sumitomo.

Hartz Mountain Industries, which started as a real estate hobby for the Sterns, began construction of its first speculative industrial building in Bayonne, New Jersey in 1966, and made its first major land acquisition with a 750-acre (300 ha) tract of land in the New Jersey Meadowlands. HMI currently owns more than 1,800 acres (730 ha) of land close to Manhattan and its real estate activities account for most of its business. Among the properties it owns are the studios for MLB Network (formerly used by MSNBC) and the land on which WWOR-TV's broadcast facilities sat prior to consolidating with sister station WNYW in Manhattan.

Max's son, Leonard N. Stern, who joined the company in 1959, is the current chairman and CEO. Constantino T. Milano is president and COO, and his son Edward Stern also works for the company. As of October 2021, Hartz Mountain has more than 250 properties throughout New Jersey and the East Coast.
