= Secaucus, New Jersey =

Town in Hudson County, New Jersey, US

- Town
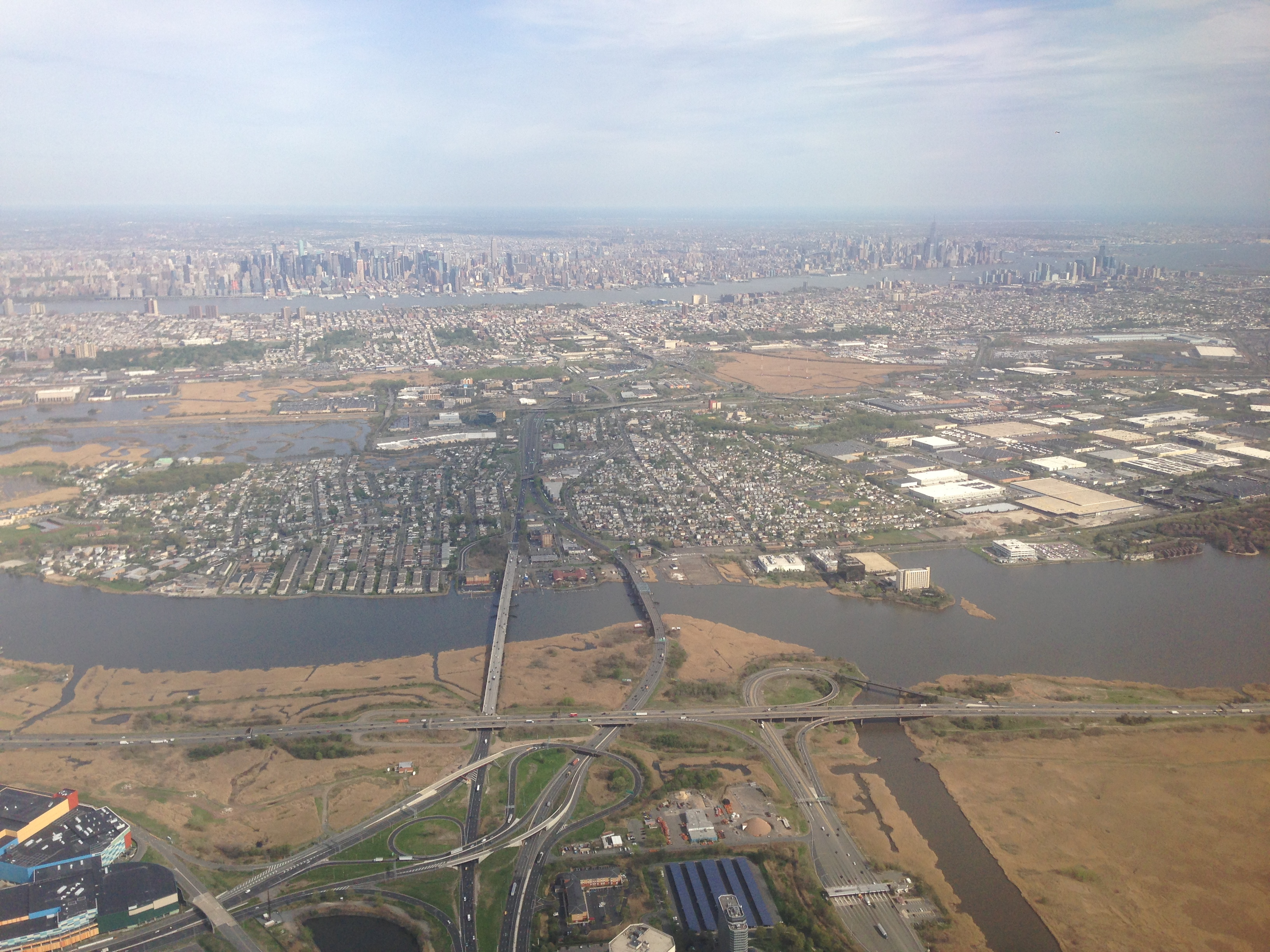
- An aerial view of Secaucus

- logo
- Nickname: "The Jewel of the Meadowlands"
- Interactive map of Secaucus, New Jersey
- Location in Hudson County Location in New Jersey Location in the United States
- Coordinates: 40.781958°N 74.067649°W
- Country: United States
- State: New Jersey
- County: Hudson
- Incorporated: March 12, 1900 (as borough)
- Reincorporated: June 5, 1917 (as town)

Government
  - Type: Town
  - Body: Town Council
  - Mayor: Michael J. Gonnelli (I, term ends December 31, 2029)
  - Administrator: Gary M. Jeffas
  - Municipal clerk: Michael Marra

Area
  - Total: 6.54 sq mi (16.95 km^{2})
  - Land: 5.83 sq mi (15.09 km^{2})
  - Water: 0.72 sq mi (1.86 km^{2}) 10.96%
  - Rank: 248th of 565 in state 4th of 12 in county
- Elevation: 7 ft (2.1 m)

Population (2020)
  - Total: 22,181
  - Estimate (2023): 21,005
  - Rank: 126th of 565 in state 8th of 12 in county
  - Density: 3,807.2/sq mi (1,470.0/km^{2})
  - Rank: 171st of 565 in state 12th of 12 in county
- Time zone: UTC−05:00 (Eastern (EST))
  - Summer (DST): UTC−04:00 (Eastern (EDT))
- ZIP Codes: 07094, 07096
- Area code: 201
- FIPS code: 3401766570
- GNIS feature ID: 0885392
- Website: secaucusnj.gov

Secaucus (/ˈsiːkɔːkəs/ SEE-kaw-kəs) is a town in Hudson County, New Jersey, United States. As of the 2020 census, the town's population was 22,181, an increase of 5,917 (+36.4%) from the 2010 census count of 16,264, which in turn reflected an increase of 333 (+2.1%) from the 15,931 counted in the 2000 census.

Located within the New Jersey Meadowlands, it is the most suburban of the county's municipalities, though large parts of the town are dedicated to light manufacturing, retail, and transportation uses, as well as protected areas.

Secaucus is a derivation of the Algonquian words for "black" (seke or sukit) and "snake" (achgook; perhaps something like /axkuk/), or "place of snakes", or from sekakes, referring to snakes.

== History ==
Sikakes, once an island, was part of the territory purchased by Director-General of New Netherland, Peter Stuyvesant in 1658. The territory was part of what is considered to be the oldest municipality in the state of New Jersey which was first chartered in 1660 as Bergen in the province of New Netherland and, in 1683, became Bergen Township.

Settlement had begun by at least 1733 by the Smith family, whose namesake Abel I. Smith Burial Ground is part of the lore of Secaucus.

Secaucus was originally formed as a borough by an act of the New Jersey Legislature on March 12, 1900, from portions of North Bergen. On June 7, 1917, Secaucus was incorporated as a town, replacing Secaucus borough, based on the results of a referendum held on June 5, 1917.

Secaucus was originally an agricultural community specializing in flowers. It later became known for its pig farms in the first half of the 20th century. In the early 1900s the town was home to approximately 55 pig farms, which reached a peak of nearly 250,000 pigs in World War II, outnumbering humans 16 to 1. These farms served the meat demands of Newark and New York, and made the farmers wealthy. Many of them were local politicians, most notably pork peddler Henry B. Krajewski, who ran for New Jersey senator, three times for governor and twice for U.S. President. The town's pig farms, rendering plants, and junk yards gave the town a reputation for being one of the most odorous in the New York metropolitan area. An ordinance passed in 1947 prohibited new farms, and in the 1950s the pig farms began to dwindle, partially after 11 of the farms were acquired for construction of the New Jersey Turnpike, which would carry tourists who would not appreciate the odor; the last farms were shut down by court order in the late 1950s.

In 1963, debris from the demolition of the original Pennsylvania Station was dumped in the Secaucus Meadowlands, including a set of statues that had been unceremoniously tossed away. In later decades Secaucus became more of a commuter town. In a non-binding referendum in 1969, 90% of voters in Secaucus chose to leave Hudson County and join Bergen County, as that county was more similar in character and had lower taxes. However, only the state has the authority to change county lines, so it never came to fruition. Today it remains the most suburban town in Hudson County. Despite being geographically located within Hudson County, Secaucus Public Library is a member of Bridging Communities, Connecting Library Services.

On February 9, 1996, two NJ Transit commuter trains collided at Bergen Junction in Secaucus when a train operating on the Bergen Line ran a signal and sideswiped a train running on the Main Line. The accident occurred during the morning rush hour just south of the current Secaucus Junction station. With three fatalities, the incident is NJ Transit's deadliest accident and was the first to involve fatalities of the passenger and crew on NJ Transit.

New Jersey Monthly magazine ranked Secaucus as its 182nd best place to live in its 2010 rankings of the "Best Places To Live" in New Jersey, after ranking the borough 11th in its 2008 rankings.

== Geography ==
Secaucus is an island in the New Jersey Meadowlands. The Hackensack River runs along western side of town. Penhorn Creek and Cromakill Creek are its eastern borders.

According to the United States Census Bureau, the town had a total area of 6.54 square miles (16.95 km^{2}), including 5.83 square miles (15.09 km^{2}) of land and 0.72 square miles (1.86 km^{2}) of water (10.96%).

At the southern end of Secaucus is Snake Hill (officially known as Laurel Hill), an igneous rock diabase intrusion jutting up some 150 feet (46 m) from the Meadowlands below, near the New Jersey Turnpike.

Being partly surrounded by the meadowlands, Secaucus provides opportunities to observe the recovery of natural marshes in the town's post-industrial, post-agricultural age. Some marsh areas in the northeast part of town have been filled to provide a new commercial area, and some to build footpaths for nature walks with signs illustrating birds and other wildlife to be seen there. At 27.4%, it has the most open "green" space in of any town in Hudson County.

Secaucus borders the municipalities of Jersey City, Kearny and North Bergen in Hudson County; and Carlstadt, East Rutherford, Lyndhurst, Rutherford in Bergen County.

Unincorporated communities, localities and place names located partially or completely within the town include:

- County Avenue – from Municipal Building to Secaucus Junction
- Harmon Cove – along the Hackensack River and Meadowlands Turnpike
- Harmon Meadow – site of Mill Creek Mall and Meadowlands Convention Center
- Laurel Hill
- Little Snake Hill
- Mill Creek Marsh
- North End – north of New Jersey Route 3; home of Secaucus High School, Schmiddt's Woods, and Mill Creek Marsh
- Riverbend – a wetlands preserve at the meander in the Hackensack River
- Secaucus Junction – NJ Transit's central rail hub
- Secaucus Plaza Central Business District at Paterson Plank Road south of Route 3
- Snake Hill – site of Laurel Hill County Park

=== Subsections ===
==== North End ====
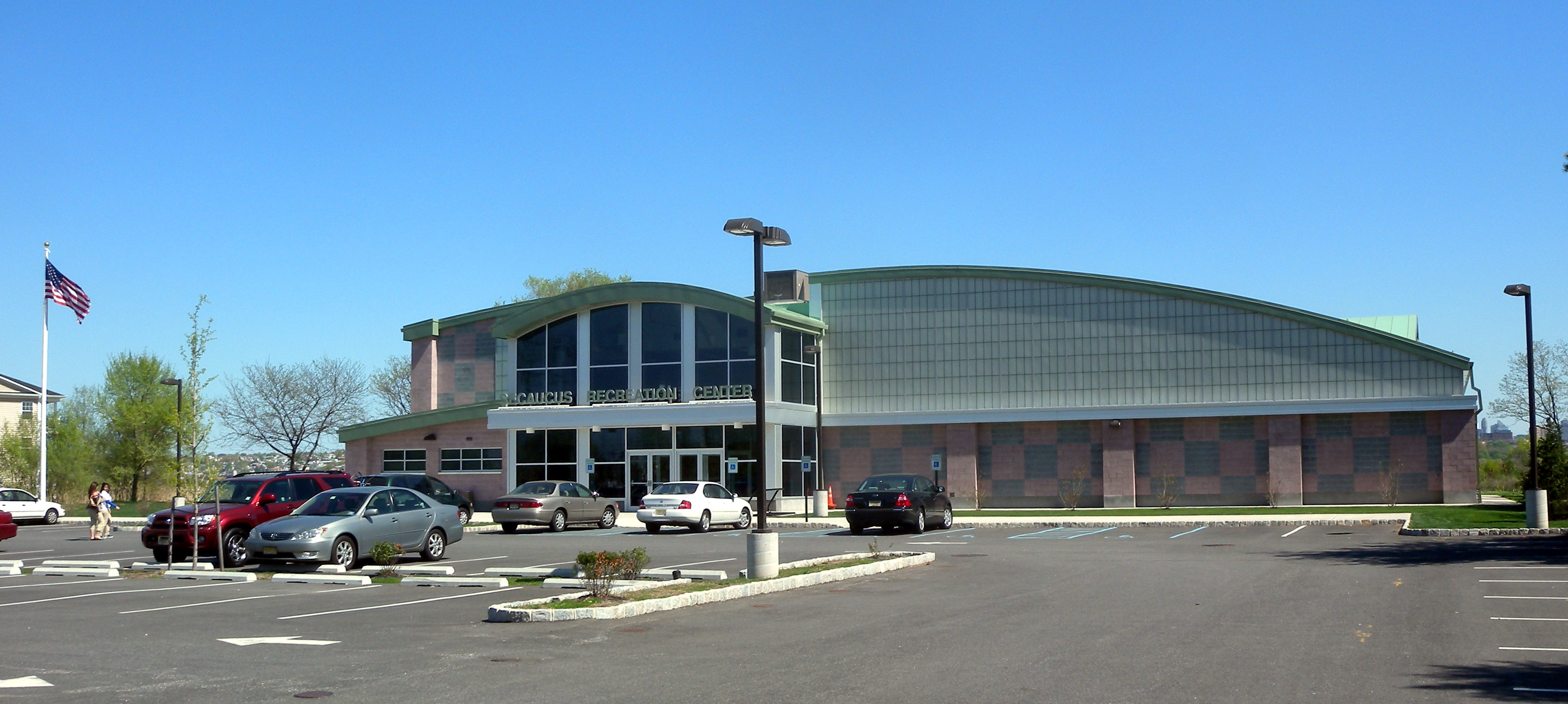
Secaucus Recreation Center

As its name suggests, the North End in Secaucus, New Jersey, is the section of town north of New Jersey Route 3 and the Secaucus Plaza Central Business District, to which it is connected by Paterson Plank Road. The Hackensack River and its tributary Mill Creek create the other borders for the district.

The North End is one of the older, traditional residential neighborhoods of Secaucus, which itself has been transformed to a commuter town and retail and outlet shopping area in the late 20th century. It is home to Secaucus High School. Nearby Schmidt's Woods is one of the last original hardwood forests in urban North Jersey. As part of the New Jersey Meadowlands District, the areas along the river are characterized by wetlands preservation and restoration areas. Mill Creek Marsh is park administered by the New Jersey Meadowlands Commission and will eventually connect to the Secaucus Greenway. It southern counterpart is known as Riverbend. The Mill Creek Mall, which is part of Harmon Meadow, is also located north of Route 3, but on the other side of Mill Creek, close to the New Jersey Turnpike Eastern Spur.

==== Harmon Cove ====
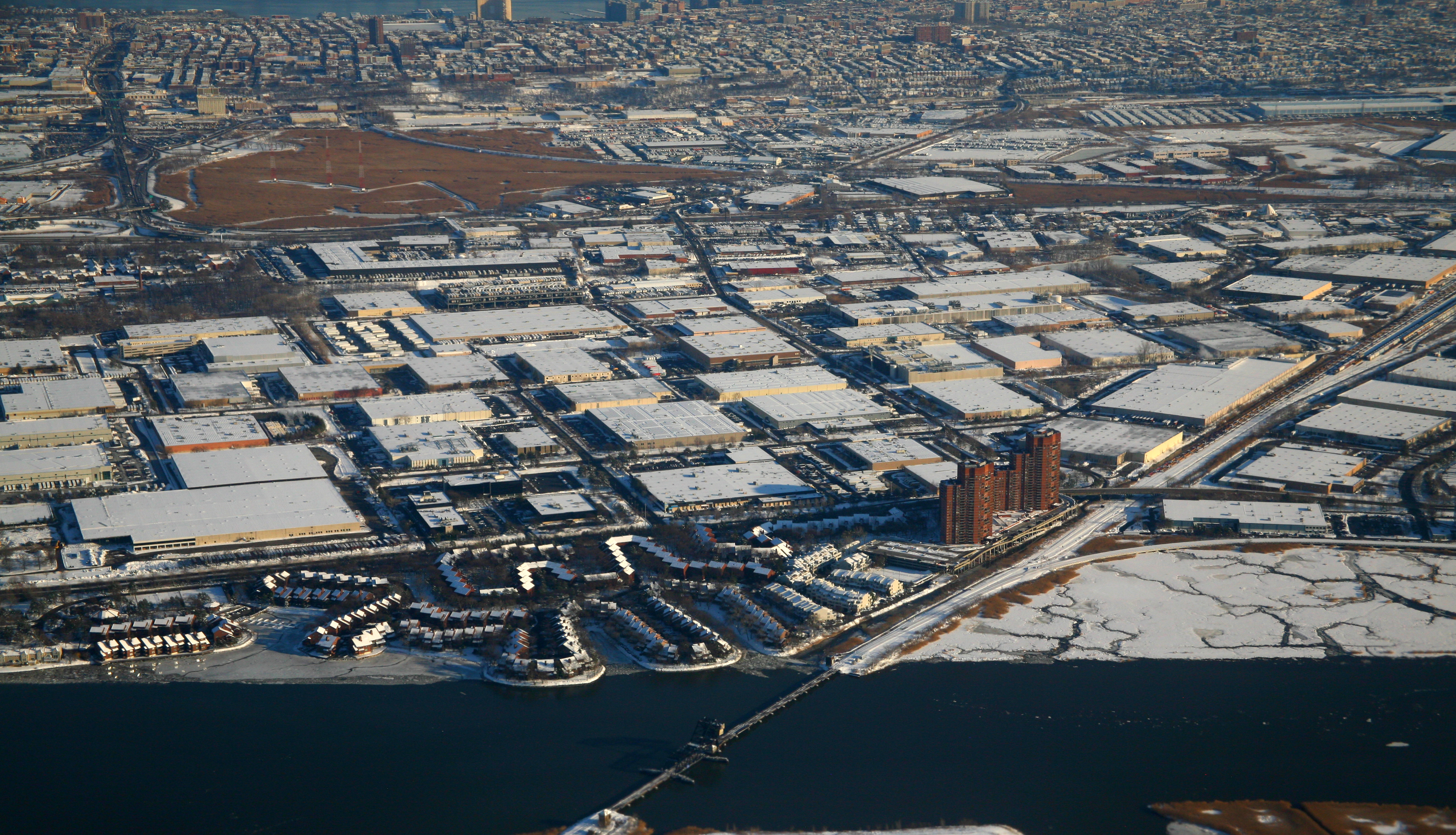
Hackensack River looking east

Harmon Cove is the western section of Secaucus, New Jersey along the Hackensack River, south of New Jersey Route 3. The name is portmanteau taken from Hartz Mountain, a corporation that owns much land in the New Jersey Meadowlands, which originally developed the area as a gated community in the 1970s with townhouses and highrise residential buildings. Part of the Hackensack RiverWalk Secaucus Greenway passes through the neighborhood, which is north of Anderson Marsh and Snake Hill, home to Hudson County's Laurel Hill Park.

NJ Transit maintained a Harmon Cove station from 1978 until the re-routing of the Bergen County Line and the opening of Secaucus Junction in August 2003. This caused NJ Transit bus 972 to be created, which connected the area of the Harmon Cove station to Secaucus Junction, and in 2006 the route was renumbered to 329. The HX Draw is used by the line to cross the river. NJ Transit bus 329 serves the area. The Hudson Regional Hospital and several hotels are located in Harmon Cove, whose main thoroughfare is Meadowlands Parkway, along which office and manufacturing buildings are found. The Harmon Cove Outlet Center is an outlet shopping district further inland from the Hackensack riverfront. Hartz Mountain Industries operates many facilities and properties in Harmon Cove.

== Demographics ==
Historical population
Census	Pop.	Note	%±
1900	1,625		—
1910	4,740		191.7%
1920	5,423		14.4%
1930	8,950		65.0%
1940	9,754		9.0%
1950	9,750		0.0%
1960	12,154		24.7%
1970	13,228		8.8%
1980	13,719		3.7%
1990	14,061		2.5%
2000	15,931		13.3%
2010	16,264		2.1%
2020	22,181		36.4%
2023 (est.)	21,005	▼	−5.3%
Population sources: 1900–1920; 1900–1910 1910–1930; 1940–2000 2000; 2010<> 2020

In the 2009–2013 American Community Survey, about 20% of the town's employed residents commute to New York City to work.

=== Racial and ethnic composition ===
Secaucus town, New Jersey – Racial and ethnic composition Note: the US Census treats Hispanic/Latino as an ethnic category. This table excludes Latinos from the racial categories and assigns them to a separate category. Hispanics/Latinos may be of any race.
Race / Ethnicity (NH = Non-Hispanic)	Pop 2000	Pop 2010	Pop 2020	% 2000	% 2010	% 2020
White alone (NH)	11,172	9,091	8,760	70.13%	55.90%	39.49%
Black or African American alone (NH)	651	575	922	4.09%	3.54%	4.16%
Native American or Alaska Native alone (NH)	12	23	23	0.08%	0.14%	0.10%
Asian alone (NH)	1,874	3,269	7,167	11.76%	20.10%	32.31%
Native Hawaiian or Pacific Islander alone (NH)	3	1	3	0.02%	0.01%	0.01%
Other race alone (NH)	24	33	122	0.15%	0.20%	0.55%
Mixed race or Multiracial (NH)	242	247	484	1.52%	1.52%	2.18%
Hispanic or Latino (any race)	1,953	3,025	4,700	12.26%	18.60%	21.19%
Total	15,931	16,264	22,181	100.00%	100.00%	100.00%

=== 2020 census ===
As of the 2020 census, Secaucus had a population of 22,181. The median age was 37.8 years. 18.3% of residents were under the age of 18 and 15.4% of residents were 65 years of age or older. For every 100 females there were 95.2 males, and for every 100 females age 18 and over there were 93.4 males age 18 and over.

100.0% of residents lived in urban areas, while 0.0% lived in rural areas.

There were 8,840 households in Secaucus, of which 30.1% had children under the age of 18 living in them. Of all households, 48.1% were married-couple households, 18.6% were households with a male householder and no spouse or partner present, and 28.1% were households with a female householder and no spouse or partner present. About 27.7% of all households were made up of individuals and 10.9% had someone living alone who was 65 years of age or older.

There were 9,316 housing units, of which 5.1% were vacant. The homeowner vacancy rate was 1.2% and the rental vacancy rate was 4.3%.

=== 2010 census ===
The 2010 United States census counted 16,264 people, 6,297 households, and 4,112 families in the town. The population density was 2,793.7 per square mile (1,078.7/km^{2}). There were 6,846 housing units at an average density of 1,175.9 per square mile (454.0/km^{2}). The racial makeup was 68.40% (11,125) White, 4.11% (668) Black or African American, 0.20% (32) Native American, 20.40% (3,318) Asian, 0.04% (6) Pacific Islander, 4.38% (713) from other races, and 2.47% (402) from two or more races. Hispanic or Latino of any race were 18.60% (3,025) of the population.

Of the 6,297 households, 27.9% had children under the age of 18; 50.0% were married couples living together; 11.4% had a female householder with no husband present and 34.7% were non-families. Of all households, 29.1% were made up of individuals and 11.3% had someone living alone who was 65 years of age or older. The average household size was 2.46 and the average family size was 3.09.

19.3% of the population were under the age of 18, 7.7% from 18 to 24, 29.9% from 25 to 44, 27.6% from 45 to 64, and 15.6% who were 65 years of age or older. The median age was 40.2 years. For every 100 females, the population had 94.7 males. For every 100 females ages 18 and older there were 90.5 males.

The Census Bureau's 2006–2010 American Community Survey showed that (in 2010 inflation-adjusted dollars) median household income was $82,289 (with a margin of error of +/− $6,523) and the median family income was $96,475 (+/− $10,189). Males had a median income of $58,902 (+/− $7,548) versus $54,665 (+/− $4,626) for females. The per capita income for the town was $38,375. About 4.7% of families and 6.6% of the population were below the poverty line, including 6.9% of those under age 18 and 7.9% of those age 65 or over.

=== 2000 census ===
According to the 2000 United States census there were 15,931 people, 6,214 households, and 3,945 families residing in the town. The population density was 2,706.7 inhabitants per square mile (1,045.1/km^{2}). There were 6,385 housing units at an average density of 1,084.8 per square mile (418.8/km^{2}). The racial makeup of the town was 78.54% White, 4.45% African American, 0.11% Native American, 11.80% Asian, 0.04% Pacific Islander, 2.79% from other races, and 2.26% from two or more races. Hispanic or Latino of any race were 12.26% of the population.

There were 6,214 households, out of which 25.7% had children under the age of 18 living with them, 49.2% were married couples living together, 10.7% had a female householder with no husband present, and 36.5% were non-families. 31.6% of all households were made up of individuals, and 12.8% had someone living alone who was 65 years of age or older. The average household size was 2.41 and the average family size was 3.08.

In the town, the population was spread out, with 19.2% under the age of 18, 6.4% from 18 to 24, 33.5% from 25 to 44, 24.8% from 45 to 64, and 16.1% who were 65 years of age or older. The median age was 40 years. For every 100 females, there were 97.9 males. For every 100 females age 18 and over, there were 94.2 males.

The median income for a household in the town was $59,800, and the median income for a family was $72,568. Males had a median income of $49,937 versus $39,370 for females. The per capita income for the town was $31,684. About 3.9% of families and 7.6% of the population were below the poverty line, including 6.4% of those under age 18 and 9.0% of those age 65 or over.

== Economy ==
Harmon Meadow Plaza

There are several large retail areas in Secaucus. Secaucus Plaza is the "downtown" area of Secaucus, just off of Route 3. The Outlets are a collection of outlet shops selling discounted name-brand merchandise in southwest Secaucus. Many factory retail outlets are scattered throughout the Harmon Cove industrial section, often located in warehouses or converted factories. Harmon Cove Outlet Center is the largest outlet mall, on Enterprise Avenue. The Mill Creek Mall is a mall on Route 3 on the west side of the Turnpike. The Plaza at Harmon Meadow is a large hotel, restaurant and shopping complex that includes the 61,000-square-foot (5,700 m^{2}) Meadowlands Convention Center, a 14-screen Showplace Theatres, a Walmart and Sam's Club located east of the New Jersey Turnpike, near Route 3 and Interchange 16E along with several hotels with a total of 1,200 rooms. A 45,000-square-foot (4,200 m^{2}) Best Buy was opened as part of the chain's 2000 expansion into the New York metro area. Secaucus is home to several corporate headquarters, including The Children's Place, FiberMedia, Hartz Mountain Industries, and Quest Diagnostics.

Goya Foods previously had its headquarters in Secaucus before relocating to neighboring Jersey City.

In 2011, two companies announced that they would be leaving Secaucus. The Manischewitz Company announced that it would relocate its administrative offices to Newark after being located in Secaucus for seven years. Panasonic's North American headquarters, with 250,000 square feet (23,000 m^{2}) of offices and 500,000 square feet (46,000 m^{2}) of warehouse space, had been located in Secaucus since 1973. After considering new locations in New York, California and Georgia, the company announced it would relocate to Newark and would receive an Urban Transit Hub Tax Credit of $102 million from the State of New Jersey for the relocation 8 miles (13 km) from its Secaucus location. The company also cited the environmental benefits possible by reducing the need of 1,000 employees to drive to work.

Secaucus is home to 13 data centers due to its proximity to New York City and its more favorable costs and storm resiliency.

== Arts and culture ==
The indie rock band, The Wrens, named their 1996 album Secaucus for the town where they resided together and worked for a decade.

=== Sports ===
Starting with the 2014–15 NBA season, Secaucus became the official review headquarters of the NBA. All reviews of controversial calls and plays take place in the replay center. Referees consult the headquarters for guidance on the correct call. The high-tech center features over 94 HD televisions, with multiple feeds of every live NBA game.

Sports companies headquartered in Secaucus include Red Bull New York, Major League Baseball's MLB Network, National Hockey League's NHL Network, and NBA Entertainment/NBA TV (whose studios are also the site of the NBA draft lottery). It is also home to men's soccer team Secaucus FC, which is part of the Garden State Soccer League.

Secaucus was the headquarters of Major League Lacrosse for the first four seasons of the league. The headquarters have since moved to Boston.

Secaucus held a pre-Super Bowl "Winter Blast" party during the first weekend of February 2014 to celebrate Super Bowl XLVIII being played in New Jersey. The party featured a number of activities, including an ice skating rink. The town had planned for large crowds, even planning special court sessions in advance to handle the projected surge of potentially disruptive visitors. The turnout was much lower than expected, with Mayor Gonnelli citing the NFL's focus on activities in Manhattan aimed at visitors.

== Government ==
=== Local government ===
Secaucus is governed under the Town form of New Jersey municipal government. The town is one of nine municipalities (of the 564) statewide that use this form of government. The governing body is comprised of the Mayor and a Town Council made up of six council members elected from three wards. The Mayor is elected at-large directly by the voters. The Town Council includes six members elected to serve four-year terms on a staggered basis, with three seats up at the same time as the mayor and three seats the following year, followed by two years with no elections.

As of 2022, the Mayor of Secaucus is Independent Michael Gonnelli, whose term of office ends December 31, 2025. Members of the Town Council are James J. Clancy Sr. (I, 2022; Ward 2), Robert V. Constantino (I, 2025; Ward 1), Mark Dehnert (I, 2025; Ward 2), John Gerbasio (I, 2022; Ward 1), William McKeever (I, 2025; Ward 3) and Orietta Turci-Tringali (I, 2022; Ward 3).

Orietta Tringali was chosen in January 2018 to fill the Ward 3 seat expiring in December 2018 that had been held by Susan Pirro until she resigned from office. On June 9, 2018, the Office of Emergency Management Building was dedicated to Pirro, who died on March 18, 2018.

In October 2016, Gary Jeffas resigned from office to fill the position as Town Administrator; his Ward 1 seat expiring in December 2018 was filled by John Gerbasio, who served on an interim basis until the November 2017 election, when he was chosen to serve the balance of the term of office.

Richard Steffens was chosen unanimously by the council in August 2009 to step in as mayor to finish the term of Dennis Elwell who resigned amid corruption charges on July 28, 2009, and was later convicted. Michael Gonnelli then won a full four-year term in November 2009 and was re-elected for another four years in 2013.

In 2018, the town had an average property tax bill of $6,258, the lowest in the county, compared to an average bill of $7,762 in Hudson County and $8,767 statewide.

==== Fire department ====
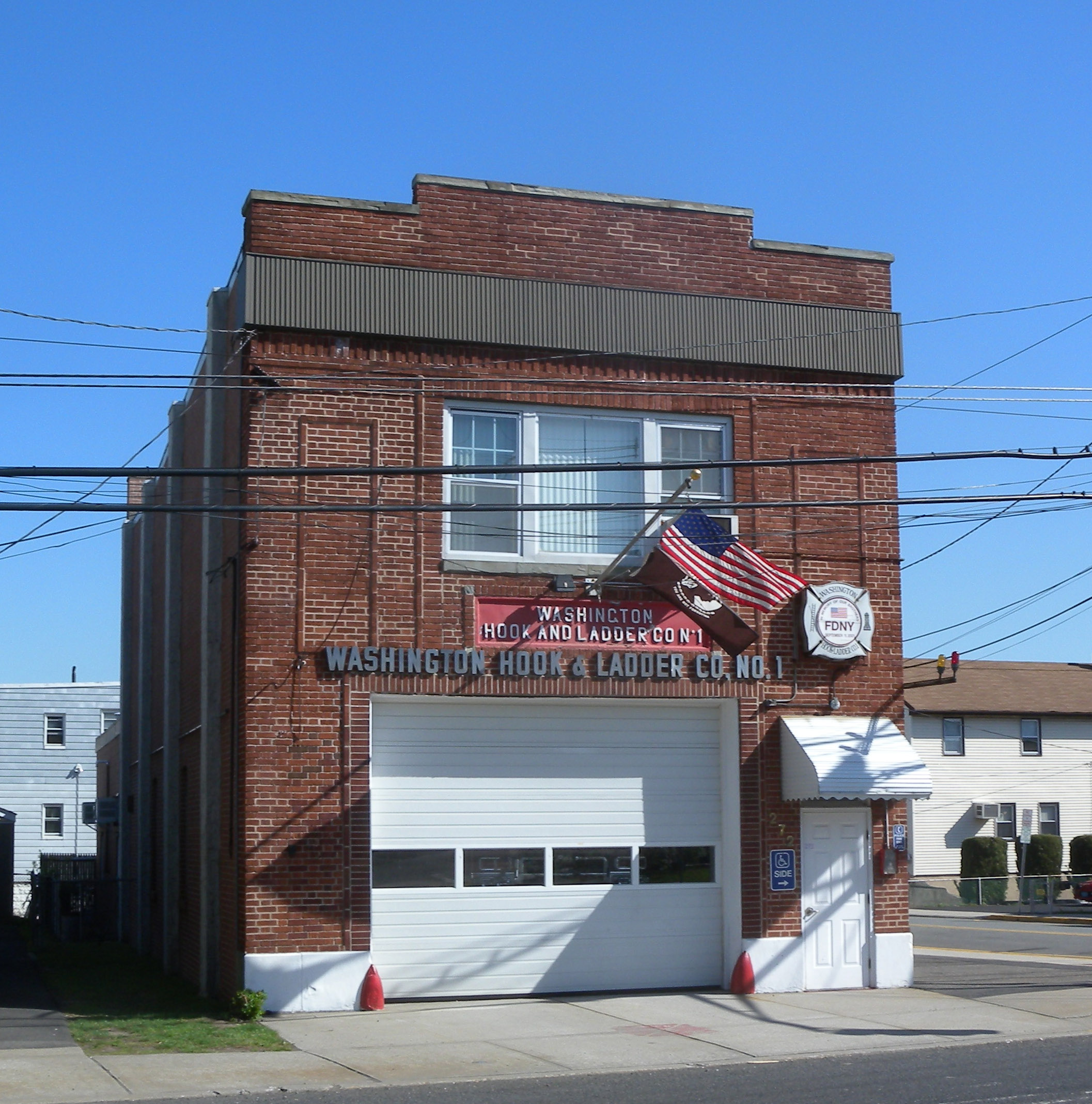
Washington Hook & Ladder Co. # 1 Firehouse

Secaucus is served around the clock by five volunteer fire companies that make up the Secaucus Fire Department, with a combined fire apparatus fleet of four Engines, two Ladders, one Rescue, one squad/brush unit, and one fireboat, operating out of five fire stations located throughout the town.

=== Federal, state and county representation ===
Secaucus is located in the 9th Congressional District and is part of New Jersey's 33rd state legislative district.

For the 119th United States Congress, New Jersey's 9th congressional district is represented by Nellie Pou (D, North Haledon) New Jersey is represented in the United States Senate by Democrats Cory Booker (Newark, term ends 2027) and Andy Kim (Moorestown, term ends 2031).

For the 2026–2027 session, the 33rd legislative district of the New Jersey Legislature is represented in the State Senate by Brian P. Stack (D, Union City) and in the General Assembly by Gabe Rodriguez (D, West New York) and Larry Wainstein (D, North Bergen).

Hudson County is governed by the directly elected Hudson County Executive and by a Board of County Commissioners, which serves as the county's legislative body. As of 2025, Hudson County's Hudson County Executive is Craig Guy (D, Jersey City), whose term of office expires December 31, 2027. Hudson County's Commissioners are Kenneth Kopacz (D, District 1 - Bayonne and parts of Jersey City; 2026, Bayonne), William O'Dea (D, District 2 - Western Jersey City; 2026, Jersey City), Vice Chair Jerry Walker (D, District 3 - South Eastern Jersey City Yraida Aponte-Lipski (D, District 4 - North Eastern Jersey City; 2026, Jersey City), Chair Anthony L. Romano Jr. (D, District 5 - Hoboken and parts of Jersey City; 2026, Hoboken), Fanny J. Cedeño (D, District 6 - Union City; 2026, Union City), Caridad Rodriguez (D, District 7 - Weehawken, West New York, and Gutenberg; 2026, West New York), Robert Bascelice (D, District 8 - West New York, North Bergen, Secaucus; 2026, North Bergen) and Albert J. Cifelli (D, District 9 - Secaucus, Kearny, East Newark, Harrison; 2026, Harrison)

Hudson County's constitutional officers are County Clerk E. Junior Maldonado (D, Jersey City, 2027), Register Jeffrey Dublin (D, Jersey City, 2026) Sheriff Frank X. Schillari (R, Jersey City, 2025) and Surrogate Tilo E. Rivas (D, Jersey City, 2029)

=== Politics ===
As of March 23, 2011, there were a total of 10,298 registered voters in Secaucus, of which 5,886 (57.2%) were registered as Democrats, 876 (8.5%) were registered as Republicans and 3,531 (34.3%) were registered as unaffiliated. There were 5 voters registered as Libertarians or Greens.

Gubernatorial election results for Secaucus
Year	Republican		Democratic		Third party(ies)	
Year	No.	%	No.	%	No.	%
2025	2,486	39.70%	3,722	59.44%	54	0.86%
2021	2,194	45.36%	2,605	53.86%	38	0.79%
2017	1,479	36.20%	2,520	61.67%	87	2.13%
2013	2,214	54.53%	1,738	42.81%	108	2.66%
2009	2,096	38.10%	2,959	53.78%	447	8.12%
2005	1,688	33.07%	3,291	64.47%	126	2.47%

In the 2024 presidential election, Democrat Kamala Harris received 49.0% of the vote (4,096 cast), narrowly ahead of Republican Donald Trump with 48.1% (4,026 votes), and other candidates with 2.9% (240 votes). In the 2012 presidential election, Democrat Barack Obama received 61.1% of the vote (4,188 cast), ahead of Republican Mitt Romney with 38.1% (2,609 votes), and other candidates with 0.8% (56 votes), among the 6,893 ballots cast by the town's 10,819 registered voters (40 ballots were spoiled), for a turnout of 63.7%. In the 2008 presidential election, Democrat Barack Obama received 53.0% of the vote here (3,889 cast), ahead of Republican John McCain with 45.6% (3,348 votes) and other candidates with 0.9% (63 votes), among the 7,344 ballots cast by the town's 10,650 registered voters, for a turnout of 69.0%. In the 2004 presidential election, Democrat John Kerry received 50.6% of the vote here (3,460 ballots cast), outpolling Republican George W. Bush with 48.6% (3,320 votes) and other candidates with 0.3% (33 votes), among the 6,838 ballots cast by the town's 9,767 registered voters, for a turnout percentage of 70.0.

Presidential Elections Results
Year	Republican	Democratic	Third Parties
2024	48.1% 4,026	49.0% 4,096	2.9% 240
2020	41.4% 3,826	56.6% 5,236	2.0% 80
2016	42.9% 3,032	54.3% 3,840	2.2% 156
2012	38.1% 2,609	61.1% 4,188	0.8% 56
2008	45.6% 3,348	53.0% 3,889	0.9% 63
2004	48.6% 3,320	50.6% 3,460	0.3% 33

In the 2013 gubernatorial election, Republican Chris Christie received 54.5% of the vote (2,214 cast), ahead of Democrat Barbara Buono with 42.8% (1,738 votes), and other candidates with 2.7% (108 votes), among the 4,376 ballots cast by the town's 10,966 registered voters (316 ballots were spoiled), for a turnout of 39.9%. In the 2009 gubernatorial election, Democrat Jon Corzine received 50.7% of the vote here (2,959 ballots cast), ahead of Republican Chris Christie with 35.9% (2,096 votes), Independent Chris Daggett with 5.4% (315 votes) and other candidates with 2.3% (132 votes), among the 5,833 ballots cast by the town's 10,158 registered voters, yielding a 57.4% turnout.

United States Senate election results for Secaucu1
Year	Republican		Democratic		Third party(ies)	
Year	No.	%	No.	%	No.	%
2024	3,165	43.03%	3,933	53.47%	257	3.49%
2018	2,283	39.03%	3,323	56.81%	243	4.15%
2012	1,942	32.46%	3,940	65.86%	100	1.67%
2006	2,228	39.56%	3,239	57.51%	165	2.93%

United States Senate election results for Secaucus2
Year	Republican		Democratic		Third party(ies)	
Year	No.	%	No.	%	No.	%
2020	3,342	38.28%	5,121	58.66%	267	3.06%
2014	1,045	33.11%	1,898	60.14%	213	6.75%
2013	920	40.26%	1,339	58.60%	26	1.14%
2008	2,324	37.28%	3,758	60.28%	152	2.44%

== Education ==
Students in pre-kindergarten through twelfth grade are educated by the Secaucus Public Schools. As of the 2020–21 school year, the district, comprised of four schools, had an enrollment of 2,229 students and 187.5 classroom teachers (on an FTE basis), for a student–teacher ratio of 11.9:1. Schools in the district (with 2020–21 enrollment data from the National Center for Education Statistics) are Millridge School / Early Learning Center serving Pre-K, Clarendon Elementary School with 470 students in grades K–5, Huber Street Elementary School with 635 students in grades Pre-K–5, Secaucus Middle School with 514 students in grades 6–8 and Secaucus High School with 594 students in grades 9–12 The athletic teams of Secaucus High School are nicknamed the "Patriots".

For the 2018–19 school year, the Hudson County Schools of Technology moved High Tech High School from its previous location in North Bergen to a newly built 350,000 square feet (33,000 m^{2}) school building in Secaucus constructed at a cost of $160 million on a 22-acre (8.9 ha) site. The former building was sold to the North Bergen School District to become the new home of North Bergen High School.

Immaculate Conception School, the town's only Catholic private day school, serving grades Pre-K through eighth grade, closed in 2008.

The Nicholas G. Hayek Watchmaking School, established in 2005, offers a two-year training program that prepares students to service watches.

== Transportation ==
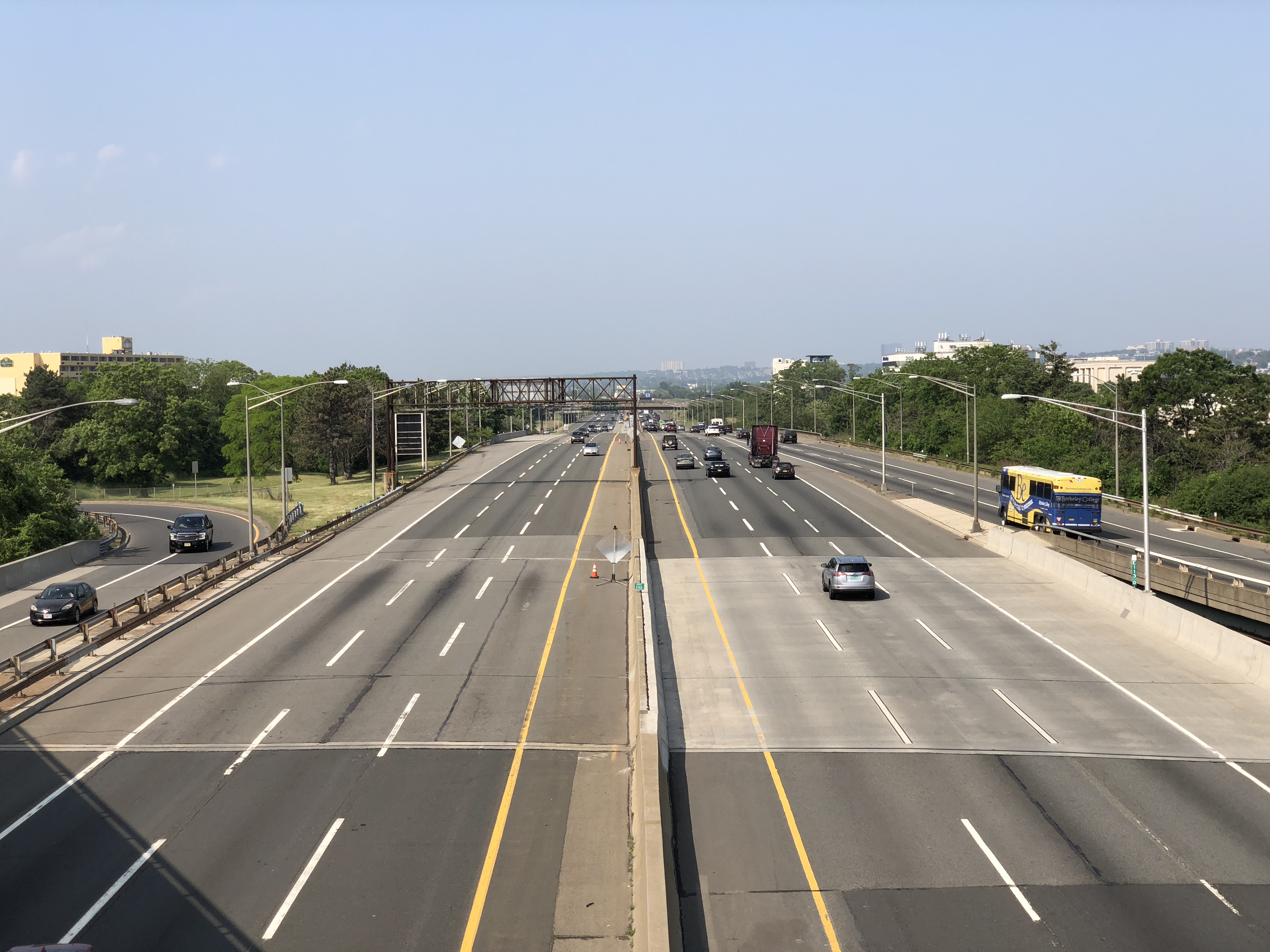
The northbound New Jersey Turnpike (Interstate 95) in Secaucus

Secaucus contains a wide variety of road and rail transportation. Because of its central location, many shipping warehouses and truck freight transfer stations are located in Secaucus, both for shipping companies such as UPS and for numerous retailers. The town also has a large rail yard and multimode terminal run by CSX and Norfolk Southern where loads are switched between trains or transferred to or from trucks.

=== Roads and highways ===
As of May 2010, the town had a total of 47.16 miles (75.90 km) of roadways, of which 38.08 miles (61.28 km) were maintained by the municipality, 2.56 miles (4.12 km) by Hudson County and 1.75 miles (2.82 km) by the New Jersey Department of Transportation and 4.77 miles (7.68 km) by the New Jersey Turnpike Authority.

Secaucus is crossed by several major roadways. The town is roughly divided into four parts by the intersecting roads of Route 3, which runs east and west, and the Eastern Spur of the New Jersey Turnpike (Interstate 95), which runs north–south. The Route 3 bridges cross the Hackensack River, connecting to East Rutherford; the eastbound bridge, constructed in 1934, was described by state transportation commissioner Diane Gutierrez-Scaccetti in 2022 as being "in the worst condition of any in the state", and is part of $143 million replacement project. Two turnpike interchanges are located within the town: Exit 16E/17 for Route 3 and Route 495 (which leads to the Lincoln Tunnel), and Exit 15X for the Secaucus Junction station (which opened in late 2005).

=== Public transportation ===
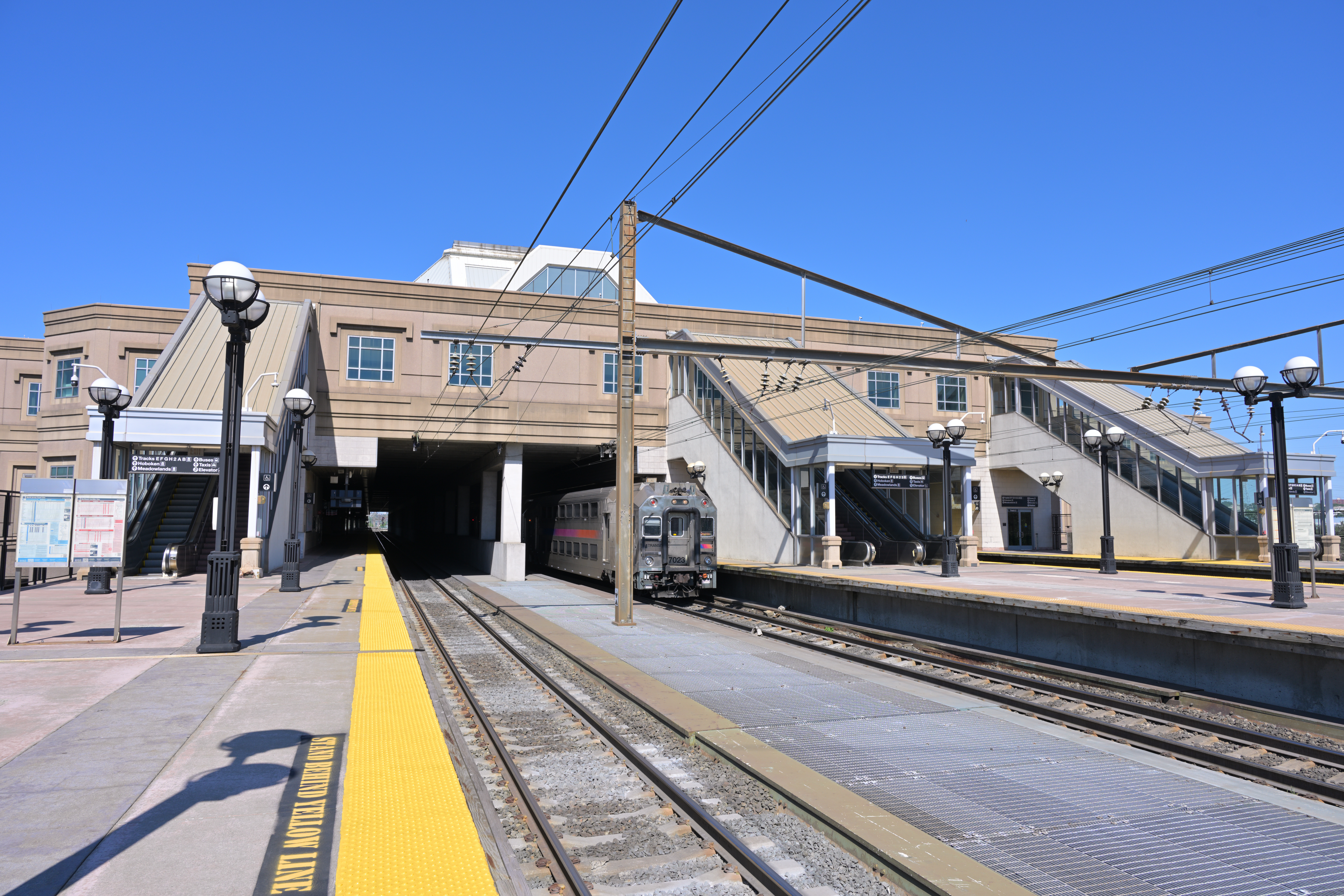
Secaucus Junction, a major public transportation hub

Secaucus is the site of NJ Transit's Frank R. Lautenberg Secaucus Junction rail station, which connects NJ Transit's two commuter rail networks in northern New Jersey. As the station is in the south end of the town, access from the rest of Secaucus is limited via County Avenue, Meadowlands Parkway or NJ Turnpike Interchange 15X. The station opened in December 2003, with a 1,100-spot parking lot that allows commuters to park and ride. Discount curbside intercity bus service is also provided outside the station by Megabus, with direct service to Boston and Philadelphia, among other locations.

Numerous NJ Transit buses serve Secaucus, including the 124, 129, 190 and 320 buses to the Port Authority Bus Terminal in Midtown Manhattan, the 78 bus to Newark, the 2 route to Jersey City, the 85 route to Hoboken and local service provided on the 772 route. There is a bus park-and-ride at the northeast corner of Secaucus.

In the first half of the 20th century the Jersey City, Hoboken and Rutherford Electric Railway operated a trolley line through the then main business district of Secaucus, on Paterson Plank Road from Jersey City and across the Hackensack River to East Rutherford.

The closest airport with scheduled passenger service is Newark Liberty International Airport, which straddles Newark and Elizabeth. The nearest intercity rail station is Newark Penn Station, a one-seat ride from Secaucus Junction.

== Media ==
Secaucus is located within the New York media market, with most of its daily papers available for sale or delivery. Local, county and regional news is covered by The Jersey Journal, the daily newspaper that relocated its offices to Secaucus in 2014 from Jersey City's Journal Square, an area of the city that was named for the newspaper that operated there for 90 years. The Secaucus Reporter is part of The Hudson Reporter group of local weeklies.

Locally, Secaucus is covered by weeklies the River View Observer and El Especialito. The town had been served by the Secaucus Home News, a weekly newspaper that published for 107 years before abruptly shutting down in 2017.

WWOR-TV, channel 9, is a television station licensed to Secaucus, serving the New York metro area television market as the flagship station of the MyNetworkTV programming service. Its studios and main offices were located in Secaucus, but have since relocated to the Fox Television Center on Manhattan's Upper East Side with co-owned WNYW. The 1987–1989 talk show The Morton Downey Jr. Show was among the WWOR-TV programs filmed in Secaucus.

The warehouse at 10 Enterprise Avenue was used as the primary filming location for the hospital drama Mercy, which aired on NBC from 2009 to 2010.

Secaucus was the original home to cable news channel MSNBC until parent company NBCUniversal elected to consolidate it with NBC News at a single facility in the company's headquarters at 30 Rockefeller Plaza. MLB Network took over the space after that.

== Notable people ==
People who were born in, residents of, or otherwise closely associated with Secaucus include the following: (B) denotes that the person was born there.

- Jeff Bittiger (born 1962), former relief pitcher for the Philadelphia Phillies, Minnesota Twins, and Chicago White Sox of Major League Baseball.
- Robert John Burck (born 1970), Times Square street performer known as the Naked Cowboy
- Jerry Casale (1933–2019), former Major League Baseball starting pitcher for the Boston Red Sox, Los Angeles Angels and Detroit Tigers
- Dave Draper (1942–2021), bodybuilder
- Dennis Elwell (born 1945), mayor of Secaucus from 2000 until 2009, when he resigned after allegations of political corruption
- Paul Iacono (born 1988), actor known for the 2009 film Fame, and the TV series The Hard Times of RJ Berger(B)
- Anthony Impreveduto (1948–2009), served on the Town Council from 1981 to 1992 and in the New Jersey General Assembly from 1987 to 2004 until he was forced to resign after pleading guilty to corruption charges
- Louis King (born 1999), college basketball player for the Oregon Ducks
- Henry B. Krajewski (1912–1966), pig farmer and frequent political candidate
- Margarita Levieva (born 1980), actress born in Russia who went to high school in Secaucus
- Mark Lukasiewicz (born 1973), former MLB pitcher who played two seasons for the Anaheim Angels
- Blaine Morris, cast member on the MTV drama Skins
- Frank MacCormack (born 1954), former Major League Baseball pitcher who played for the Detroit Tigers and Seattle Mariners.
- John J. Matheussen (born 1953), politician who represented the 4th Legislative District in the New Jersey Senate from 1992 to 2003
- Vincent Prieto (born 1960), member of the New Jersey General Assembly since 2004 who was chosen as Assembly Speaker for the 2014–2015 Legislative Session
- Dan Resin (1931–2010), actor known as Dr. Beeper in the film Caddyshack and as the Ty-D-Bol man in toilet cleaner commercials
- Ian Roberts (born 1965), founding member of the Upright Citizens Brigade improv troupe
- Russ (born 1992), rapper
- Bart Shatto, actor
- Seven Volpone (born 1972), entrepreneur, business executive, singer, songwriter and record producer
- Beverly Whipple (1941–2026), sexologist, author and academic, who co-authored The G Spot and Other Recent Discoveries About Human Sexuality
