= Rutherford, New Jersey =

Borough in Bergen County, New Jersey, US

- Borough
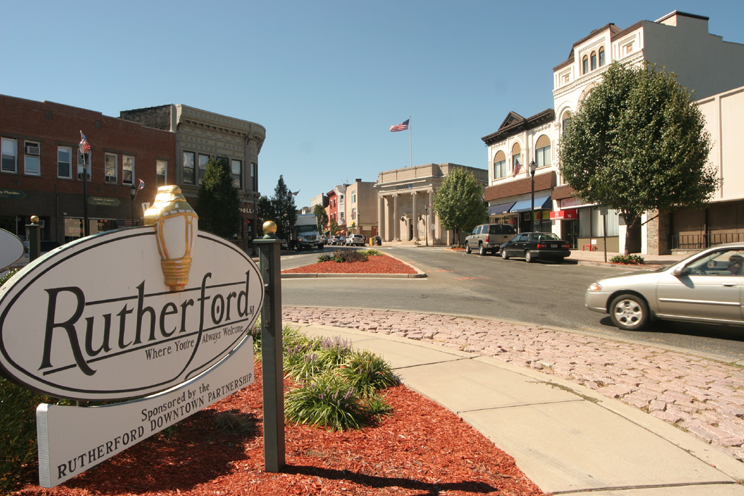
- The ‘Welcome to Rutherford’ sign

- Seal
- Nicknames: "Borough of Trees", "First Borough of Bergen County"
- Location of Rutherford in Bergen County highlighted in red (left). Inset map: Location of Bergen County in New Jersey highlighted in orange (right).

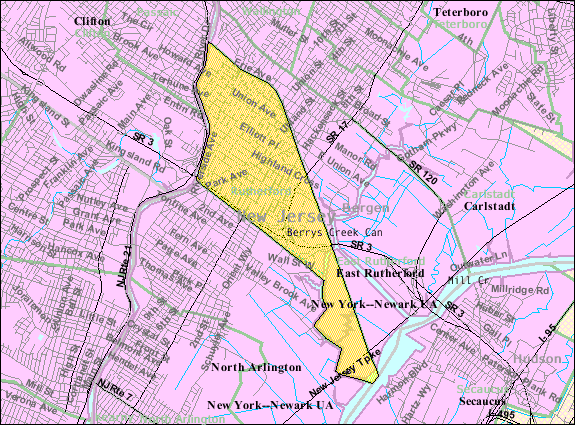
- Census Bureau map of Rutherford, New Jersey

- Location in Bergen County Location in New Jersey Location in the United States
- Coordinates: 40.820314°N 74.106041°W
- Country: United States
- State: New Jersey
- County: Bergen
- Incorporated: September 21, 1881
- Named for: John Rutherfurd

Government
  - Type: Borough
  - Body: Mayor and Council
  - Mayor: Frank Nunziato (D, term ends December 31, 2023)
  - Administrator: Robert J. Kakoleski
  - Municipal clerk: Margaret "Missy" Scanlon

Area
  - Total: 2.89 sq mi (7.49 km^{2})
  - Land: 2.78 sq mi (7.20 km^{2})
  - Water: 0.11 sq mi (0.29 km^{2}) 3.88%
  - Rank: 342nd of 565 in state 29th of 70 in county
- Elevation: 66 ft (20 m)

Population (2020)
  - Total: 18,834
  - Estimate (2023): 18,852
  - Rank: 146th of 565 in state 16th of 70 in county
  - Density: 6,772.4/sq mi (2,614.8/km^{2})
  - Rank: 72nd of 565 in state 22nd of 70 in county
- Time zone: UTC−05:00 (Eastern (EST))
  - Summer (DST): UTC−04:00 (Eastern (EDT))
- ZIP Code: 07070
- Area code: 201
- FIPS code: 3400365280
- GNIS feature ID: 0885383
- Website: www.rutherfordboronj.com

Rutherford is a borough in Bergen County, in the U.S. state of New Jersey. As of the 2020 United States census, the borough's population was 18,834, an increase of 773 (+4.3%) from the 2010 census count of 18,061, which in turn reflected a decline of 49 (−0.3%) from the 18,110 counted in the 2000 census.

Rutherford was formed as a borough by an act of the New Jersey Legislature on September 21, 1881, from portions of Union Township, based on the results of a referendum held on the previous day. The borough was named for John Rutherfurd, a U.S. Senator who owned land in the area.

Rutherford has been called the "Borough of Trees" and "The First Borough of Bergen County", and is known as well for its pedestrian-focused downtown area adjacent to the borough's Bergen County Line (New Jersey Transit) railway station.

== History ==
The ridge above the New Jersey Meadowlands upon which Rutherford sits was settled by Lenape Native Americans long before the arrival of Walling Van Winkle in 1687. Union Avenue, which runs from the Meadowlands to the Passaic River, may have been an Indian trail, but was more likely a property boundary line; it was referenced in the 1668 grant of land by proprietary Governor Philip Carteret to John Berry.

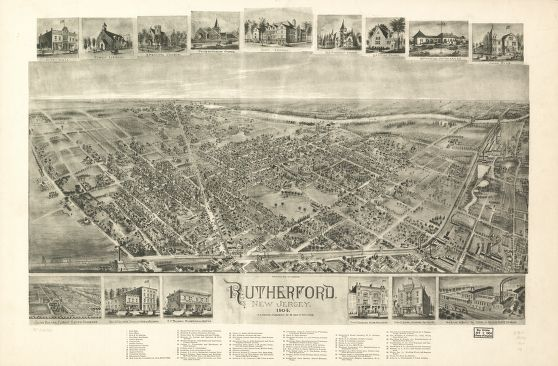
Bird's-eye view of Rutherford in 1904

During the early days of settlement, the land that is now Rutherford was part of New Barbadoes Township, as Berry had lived in Barbados, another English colony, before claiming his grant in New Jersey. New Barbadoes was part of Essex County from 1693 to 1710, when Bergen County was formed. In 1826, the land became part of Lodi Township (of which today's remaining portion is now South Hackensack). When Hudson County was formed in 1840, the area that is today North Arlington, Lyndhurst, Rutherford and East Rutherford became part of Harrison Township (of which today's remaining portion is Harrison town). However, the area reverted to Bergen County in 1852 and became known as Union Township.

Part of the region was known as Boiling Springs for a powerful and ceaseless spring located in the vicinity. Despite its name, the spring actually consisted of cold groundwater seeps rather than hot springs.

The Erie Railroad built its Main Line from Jersey City across the Meadowlands in the 1840s. Daniel Van Winkle, a descendant of Walling, donated land in 1866 for a train station at Boiling Springs. Several resorts were built along the Passaic, with guests disembarking at Boiling Springs station and taking Union Avenue to the river. Later, the railroad opened a station closer to the river, at Carlton Hill, and a horsecar line (briefly on rails) along Jackson Ave took travelers to the resort area.

At the time, much of the property in Rutherford was farmland owned by the estate of John Rutherfurd, a former New Jersey legislator and U.S. Senator, whose homestead was along the Passaic River, near present-day Rutherford Avenue. Van Winkle opened a real estate office at Depot Square (now Station Square) to sell the land of the Rutherfurd Park Association, and began to lay out the area's street grid. The main roads were Orient Way, a wide boulevard heading south-southwest from Station Square, and Park Avenue, which headed west-southwest from Station Square to bring traffic to the new Valley Brook Race Course in what is now Lyndhurst.

In the 1870s, the area began to be called "Rutherford". The definitive reason for the change in spelling of the final syllable from "furd" to "ford" is unknown, though the change may have been the result of name recognition of the Ohio politician Rutherford B. Hayes, who was elected President in 1876, or could have been because of a clerical error by the United States Postal Service. The Post Office opened a facility called "Rutherford" in 1876. On September 21, 1881, the Borough of Rutherford was formed by formal vote of secession from Union Township. By then, the community had about 1,000 residents.

In August 2025, a fire destroyed the Victorian building of Congregation Beth-El, an Orthodox Jewish synagogue dating back to its founding in 1919. In 2012, a Molotov cocktail had been thrown the synagogue.

=== Historic sites ===
Rutherford is home to the following locations on the National Register of Historic Places:

- Iviswold – 223 Montross Avenue (added 2004). Located on the campus of Felician College, a $9 million renovation project of the Iviswold castle that took 14 years was completed in 2013. Originally constructed by Floyd W. Tomkins in 1869, the house was expanded to three levels, 25 rooms and 18,000 square feet (1,700 m^{2}) by textbook publisher David Brinkerhoff Iverson after he acquired the home in 1887, based on a design by architect William H. Miller.
- Kip Homestead – 12 Meadow Road (added 1983).
- Rutherford station – Station Square (added 1984). New Jersey Transit initiated a $1 million project in 2009 to renovate the station, which had been constructed in 1898, to restore the interior of the structure.
- William Carlos Williams House – 9 Ridge Road (added 1973).
- Yereance-Berry House – 91 Crane Avenue (added 1983).

== Geography ==
According to the United States Census Bureau, the borough had a total area of 2.89 square miles (7.49 km^{2}), including 2.78 square miles (7.20 km^{2}) of land and 0.11 square miles (0.29 km^{2}) of water (3.88%).

Rutherford is an inner-ring suburb of New York City, located 8 miles (13 km) west of Midtown Manhattan.

The borough is bounded by the Passaic River bordering Clifton and Passaic in Passaic County to the west, the Erie Railroad bordering East Rutherford to the north and east, the Hackensack River bordering Secaucus to the southeast, and Berrys Creek, Wall Street West and Rutherford Avenue bordering Lyndhurst to the south and southwest.

== Demographics ==
Historical population
Census	Pop.	Note	%±
1880	2,299		—
1890	2,293		−0.3%
1900	4,411		92.4%
1910	7,045		59.7%
1920	9,497		34.8%
1930	14,915		57.0%
1940	15,466		3.7%
1950	17,411		12.6%
1960	20,473		17.6%
1970	20,802		1.6%
1980	19,068		−8.3%
1990	17,790		−6.7%
2000	18,110		1.8%
2010	18,061		−0.3%
2020	18,834		4.3%
2023 (est.)	18,852	▲	0.1%
Population sources: 1880–1920; 1880–1890 1890–1910; 1890–1930 1900–2020; 2000 2010 2020

=== Racial and ethnic composition ===
Rutherford borough, New Jersey – Racial and ethnic composition Note: the US Census treats Hispanic/Latino as an ethnic category. This table excludes Latinos from the racial categories and assigns them to a separate category. Hispanics/Latinos may be of any race.
Race / Ethnicity (NH = Non-Hispanic)	Pop 2000	Pop 2010	Pop 2020	% 2000	% 2010	% 2020
White alone (NH)	13,696	12,298	11,242	75.63%	68.09%	59.69%
Black or African American alone (NH)	475	454	631	2.62%	2.51%	3.35%
Native American or Alaska Native alone (NH)	8	12	27	0.04%	0.07%	0.14%
Asian alone (NH)	2,054	2,340	2,688	11.34%	12.96%	14.27%
Native Hawaiian or Pacific Islander alone (NH)	5	0	6	0.03%	0.00%	0.03%
Other race alone (NH)	38	61	124	0.21%	0.34%	0.66%
Mixed race or Multiracial (NH)	279	353	721	1.54%	1.95%	3.83%
Hispanic or Latino (any race)	1,555	2,543	3,395	8.59%	14.08%	18.03%
Total	18,110	18,061	18,834	100.00%	100.00%	100.00%

=== 2020 census ===
As of the 2020 census, Rutherford had a population of 18,834. The median age was 39.8 years. 20.1% of residents were under the age of 18 and 15.4% of residents were 65 years of age or older. For every 100 females there were 92.9 males, and for every 100 females age 18 and over there were 90.0 males age 18 and over.

100.0% of residents lived in urban areas, while 0.0% lived in rural areas.

There were 7,061 households in Rutherford, of which 31.7% had children under the age of 18 living in them. Of all households, 53.2% were married-couple households, 15.9% were households with a male householder and no spouse or partner present, and 25.3% were households with a female householder and no spouse or partner present. About 25.6% of all households were made up of individuals and 9.8% had someone living alone who was 65 years of age or older.

There were 7,370 housing units, of which 4.2% were vacant. The homeowner vacancy rate was 0.6% and the rental vacancy rate was 4.7%.

=== Income and Poverty ===
==== Income and Earnings ====
$136,069 Median Household Income

- Families - $160,363
- Married-couple families - $193,984
- Nonfamily households - $70,638

==== Poverty ====
4.8% Poverty

- Under 18 years - 4.2%
- 18–64 years - 4.3%
- 65 years and over - 7.8%

=== Education ===
==== Educational Attainment ====
Population 25 Years and Older

- High school or equivalent - 17.3%
- Some college - 13.2%
- Associate's degree- 5.3%
- Bachelor's degree - 35.6%
- Graduate or professional degree - 23.2%

=== 2010 census ===
The 2010 United States census counted 18,061 people, 6,949 households, and 4,663 families in the borough. The population density was 6,437.4 per square mile (2,485.5/km^{2}). There were 7,278 housing units at an average density of 2,594.1 per square mile (1,001.6/km^{2}). The racial makeup was 77.57% (14,010) White, 2.92% (527) Black or African American, 0.07% (13) Native American, 13.08% (2,362) Asian, 0.01% (1) Pacific Islander, 3.68% (664) from other races, and 2.68% (484) from two or more races. Hispanic or Latino residents of any race were 14.08% (2,543) of the population.

Of the 6,949 households, 29.8% had children under the age of 18; 52.8% were married couples living together; 10.4% had a female householder with no husband present and 32.9% were non-families. Of all households, 27.4% were made up of individuals and 9.1% had someone living alone who was 65 years of age or older. The average household size was 2.56 and the average family size was 3.17.

21.0% of the population was under the age of 18, 8.7% was from 18 to 24, 27.6% from 25 to 44, 29.3% from 45 to 64, and 13.5% was 65 years of age or older. The median age was 40.3 years. For every 100 females, the population had 92.7 males. For every 100 females ages 18 and older there were 90.2 males.

The Census Bureau's 2006–2010 American Community Survey showed that (in 2010 inflation-adjusted dollars) median household income was $85,783 (with a margin of error of +/− $4,632) and the median family income was $104,293 (+/− $6,102). Males had a median income of $70,071 (+/− $8,275) versus $55,080 (+/− $4,045) for females. The per capita income for the borough was $41,662 (+/− $3,383). About 3.6% of families and 4.6% of the population were below the poverty line, including 4.5% of those under age 18 and 5.3% of those age 65 or over.

Same-sex couples headed 65 households in 2010, an increase from the 48 counted in 2000.

=== 2000 census ===
As of the 2000 United States census there were 18,110 people, 7,055 households, and 4,670 families residing in the borough. The population density was 6,451.7 inhabitants per square mile (2,491.0/km^{2}). There were 7,214 housing units at an average density of 2,570.0 per square mile (992.3/km^{2}). The racial makeup of the borough was 81.99% White, 2.70% African American, 0.04% Native American, 11.34% Asian, 0.03% Pacific Islander, 1.86% from other races, and 2.03% from two or more races. Hispanic or Latino residents of any race were 8.59% of the population.

There were 7,055 households, out of which 28.8% had children under the age of 18 living with them, 53.5% were married couples living together, 9.2% had a female householder with no husband present, and 33.8% were non-families. 28.3% of all households were made up of individuals, and 10.7% had someone living alone who was 65 years of age or older. The average household size was 2.52 and the average family size was 3.16.

In the borough 20.8% of the population was under the age of 18, 7.4% was from 18 to 24, 32.6% from 25 to 44, 24.6% from 45 to 64, and 14.6% was 65 years of age or older. The median age was 39 years. For every 100 females, there were 92.4 males. For every 100 females age 18 and over, there were 90.3 males.

The median income for a household in the borough was $63,820, and the median income for a family was $78,120. Males had a median income of $51,376 versus $39,950 for females. The per capita income for the borough was $30,495. About 2.3% of families and 3.7% of the population were below the poverty line, including 3.1% of those under age 18 and 6.9% of those age 65 or over.

== Economy ==
Rutherford is the site of Architectural Window Manufacturing Corporation's plant and Blue Foundry Bank's (formerly Boiling Springs Savings Bank) corporate headquarters.

Rutherford, together with Lyndhurst and North Arlington, was the site of the EnCap project, an effort to remediate landfills on the 785-acre (3.18 km^{2}) site and construct homes and golf courses on top of the remediated site. On May 27, 2008, the New Jersey Meadowlands Commission terminated its agreement with EnCap Golf Holdings, the company that had the contract to redevelop the site, after the company had missed targets to clean up the landfills as part of the project.

The Highland Cross Development is a proposed project to consist of 800 units of housing, including 160 affordable units, two hotels, and a large retail component. Rutherford officials have worked to get approval for the plan, in the face of opposition from the 14 mayors of the Hackensack Meadowlands Municipal Committee.

== Arts and culture ==
William Carlos Williams, the Pulitzer Prize–winning poet who died in 1963, was born in Rutherford in 1883. For most of his adult life, he maintained a physician's office in the house in which he lived, at 9 Ridge Road, at the corner of Park Avenue, even as he continued his artistic endeavors.

The Rivoli Theatre was opened in 1922 as a vaudeville house but was quickly converted into a movie palace. It was known for a large crystal chandelier suspended from the center of the auditorium. On January 9, 1977, the Rivoli was severely damaged in a fire. Soon afterward, a plan was developed to restore the Rivoli and turn it into a performing arts center. The William Carlos Williams Center for the Performing Arts opened in 1981 and contains three movie screens as well as two performance halls. Since 1995, the Williams Center's primary focus has been on concerts, ballet, opera, and theater for children.

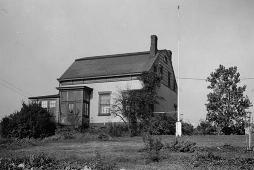
The Yereance-Berry House in 1938. Home of the Meadowlands Museum.

The Meadowlands Museum, which focuses on local history and began as a project of parents of children in the public schools in 1961 and was originally based in a room at Sylvan School, moved to the Yereance-Berry House at 91 Crane Avenue in 1974.

The GFWC Woman's Club of Rutherford is a non-profit volunteer organization that was organized in 1889. The club is located in the former Iviswold carriage house.

The Rutherford Community Band was founded in 1941 and performs free concerts at venues throughout the borough, including the Hutzel Memorial Band Shell in Lincoln Park.

=== Annual cultural events ===
The first annual Rutherford West End Festival was held October 3, 2009, in the West End section of town.

The Rutherford Multicultural Festival is an annual event that provides traditional entertainment and food from around the world.

In 2017, the first annual Rutherford Downhill Derby provided kids and adults with the opportunity to build, design, and race gravity powered race carts.

In 2018, the Rutherford Pride Alliance was founded. In June 2019, there was a public raising of the LGBTQ Rainbow flag, to mark the 50th anniversary of the Stonewall riots; the Rutherford council unanimously approved the flag raising, despite opposition from residents who argued that the move was divisive, and special preferences were being granted. The Rutherford Pride Alliance started holding an annual PrideFest in 2022 and in 2026 it was renamed South Bergen Pridefest.

== Parks and recreation ==
Rutherford Memorial Park, in the northwest corner of town along the Passaic, was set aside as parkland by the voters in 1951. Its 30 acres (120,000 m^{2}) include two baseball diamonds, five softball diamonds, a Little League Baseball field, a football stadium, six tennis courts, two basketball courts, and three playgrounds. Other active recreation parks include Tamblyn Field, near Route 3.

The borough also has several smaller passive parks, including Lincoln Park across from borough hall, which was renovated in 2004. It includes a band shell and several monuments, including a cannon dating to the Spanish–American War, and is home to the borough's 9/11 memorial, containing a piece of steel debris recovered from the site of the attacks. Sunset Park is located just north of the intersection of Union and Jackson Avenues and is on the western-facing side of a rather steep hill. A plan to redesign the park is currently being developed. Firefighters' Memorial Park is a pocket park located at the intersection of Park and Mortimer Avenues.

Lincoln Park has been host to town events, concerts, and memorials for decades. The Rutherford Community Band plays concerts during the summer. Other summer concerts are sponsored by the borough, as well as several movie nights in the park. In the fall, it has hosted the Bergen County Cultural Festival, which is funded and run by the Civil Rights Commission.

The Nereid Boat Club occupies a former boat sales building on the Passaic, at the foot of Newell Avenue. The rowing club, established in Nutley in 1875, relocated to Rutherford in 1996.

== Government ==
=== Local government ===
Rutherford is governed under the borough form of New Jersey municipal government, which is used in 218 municipalities (of the 564) statewide, making it the most common form of government in New Jersey. The governing body is comprised of a mayor and a borough council, with all positions elected at-large on a partisan basis as part of the November general election. A mayor is elected directly by the voters to a four-year term of office. The borough council includes six members elected to serve three-year terms on a staggered basis, with two seats coming up for election each year in a three-year cycle. The borough form of government used by Rutherford is a "weak mayor / strong council" government in which council members act as the legislative body with the mayor presiding at meetings and voting only in the event of a tie. The mayor can veto ordinances subject to an override by a two-thirds majority vote of the council. The mayor makes committee and liaison assignments for council members, and most appointments are made by the mayor with the advice and consent of the council. The borough operates with numerous committees to assist the government in carrying out its responsibilities. In addition to statutory bodies such as the planning board and zoning board of adjustment, dozens of volunteers staff other committees appointed annually, providing recommendations to the council.

As of 2023, the mayor of the Borough of Rutherford is Democrat Frank Nunziato, whose term of office ends December 31, 2027. Members of the Rutherford Borough Council are Council President Stephanie McGowan (D, 2024), Matthew Cokeley (D, 2024), Christie Del Rey-Cone (D, 2023), Raymond L. Guzmán (D, 2025), Susan E. Quatrone (D, 2023), and John Errico (D, 2025).(.

In November 2019, the borough council selected Raymond Guzman from a list of three candidates nominated by the Democratic municipal committee to complete the term expiring in December 2020 that had been held by Frank Nunziato until he resigned from his council seat to take office as mayor.

=== Federal, state and county representation ===
Rutherford is located in the 9th Congressional District and is part of New Jersey's 36th state legislative district.

For the 119th United States Congress, New Jersey's 9th congressional district is represented by Nellie Pou (D, North Haledon) New Jersey is represented in the United States Senate by Democrats Cory Booker (Newark, term ends 2027) and Andy Kim (Moorestown, term ends 2031).

For the 2026–2027 session, the 36th legislative district of the New Jersey Legislature is represented in the State Senate by Paul Sarlo (D, Wood-Ridge) and in the General Assembly by Clinton Calabrese (D, Cliffside Park) and Gary Schaer (D, Passaic).

Bergen County is governed by a directly elected County Executive, with legislative functions performed by a Board of County Commissioners comprised of seven members who are elected at-large to three-year terms in partisan elections on a staggered basis, with either two or three seats coming up for election each November; a Chairman and Vice Chairman are selected from among its seven members at a reorganization meeting held every January. As of 2025, the county executive is James J. Tedesco III (D, Paramus), whose four-year term of office ends December 31, 2026.

Bergen County's Commissioners are Chair Mary J. Amoroso (D, Mahwah, 2025), Vice Chair Steven A. Tanelli (D, North Arlington, 2027), Chair Pro Tem Joan Voss (D, Fort Lee, 2026), Rafael Marte (D, Bergenfield, 2026), Germaine M. Ortiz (D, Emerson, 2025), Thomas J. Sullivan Jr. (D, Montvale, 2025) and Tracy Silna Zur (D, Franklin Lakes, 2027).

Bergen County's elected constitutional officials are Clerk John S. Hogan (D, Northvale, 2026), Sheriff Anthony Cureton (D, Englewood, 2027) and Surrogate Michael R. Dressler (D, Cresskill, 2026).

=== Politics ===
United States presidential election results for Rutherford 2024 2020 2016 2012 2008 2004
Year	Republican		Democratic		Third party(ies)	
Year	No.	%	No.	%	No.	%
2024	4,204	43.32%	5,302	54.63%	199	2.05%
2020	4,176	39.85%	6,182	59.00%	120	1.15%
2016	3,681	41.74%	4,796	54.39%	341	3.87%
2012	3,313	40.43%	4,771	58.22%	111	1.35%
2008	3,973	44.57%	4,824	54.12%	117	1.31%
2004	4,030	46.51%	4,539	52.38%	96	1.11%

As of March 2011, there were a total of 10,609 registered voters in Rutherford, of which 3,436 (32.4% vs. 31.7% countywide) were registered as Democrats, 2,287 (21.6% vs. 21.1%) were registered as Republicans and 4,875 (46.0% vs. 47.1%) were registered as Unaffiliated. There were 11 voters registered as Libertarians or Greens. Among the borough's 2010 Census population, 58.7% (vs. 57.1% in Bergen County) were registered to vote, including 74.3% of those ages 18 and over (vs. 73.7% countywide).

In the 2016 presidential election, Democrat Hillary Clinton received 4.796 votes (54.0% vs. 54.2% countywide), ahead of Republican Donald Trump with 3.681 votes (41.4% vs. 41.1%) and other candidates with 405 votes (4.6% vs. 4.6%), among the 8,978 ballots cast by the borough's 11,661 registered voters, for a turnout of 77.0% (vs. 72.5% in Bergen County). In the 2012 presidential election, Democrat Barack Obama received 4,771 votes (57.7% vs. 54.8% countywide), ahead of Republican Mitt Romney with 3,313 votes (40.1% vs. 43.5%) and other candidates with 111 votes (1.3% vs. 0.9%), among the 8,266 ballots cast by the borough's 11,229 registered voters, for a turnout of 73.6% (vs. 70.4% in Bergen County). In the 2008 presidential election, Democrat Barack Obama received 4,824 votes (53.7% vs. 53.9% countywide), ahead of Republican John McCain with 3,973 votes (44.2% vs. 44.5%) and other candidates with 117 votes (1.3% vs. 0.8%), among the 8,984 ballots cast by the borough's 11,275 registered voters, for a turnout of 79.7% (vs. 76.8% in Bergen County).

Gubernatorial election results for Rutherford
Year	Republican		Democratic		Third party(ies)	
Year	No.	%	No.	%	No.	%
2025	3,032	39.37%	4,638	60.23%	31	0.40%
2021	2,794	44.57%	3,423	54.60%	52	0.83%
2017	1,901	39.60%	2,814	58.61%	86	1.79%
2013	2,918	56.65%	2,174	42.21%	59	1.15%
2009	2,642	44.00%	2,910	48.46%	453	7.54%
2005	2,497	42.02%	3,259	54.84%	187	3.15%

In the 2013 gubernatorial election, Republican Chris Christie received 56.6% of the vote (2,918 cast), ahead of Democrat Barbara Buono with 42.2% (2,174 votes), and other candidates with 1.1% (59 votes), among the 5,299 ballots cast by the borough's 10,653 registered voters (148 ballots were spoiled), for a turnout of 49.7%. In the 2009 gubernatorial election, Democrat Jon Corzine received 2,910 ballots cast (48.0% vs. 48.0% countywide), ahead of Republican Chris Christie with 2,642 votes (43.6% vs. 45.8%), Independent Chris Daggett with 421 votes (6.9% vs. 4.7%) and other candidates with 32 votes (0.5% vs. 0.5%), among the 6,062 ballots cast by the borough's 10,957 registered voters, yielding a 55.3% turnout (vs. 50.0% in the county).

United States Senate election results for Rutherford1
Year	Republican		Democratic		Third party(ies)	
Year	No.	%	No.	%	No.	%
2024	3,819	41.62%	5,132	55.93%	224	2.44%
2018	2,802	41.45%	3,702	54.76%	256	3.79%
2012	2,984	38.92%	4,505	58.76%	178	2.32%
2006	2,659	45.12%	3,124	53.01%	110	1.87%

United States Senate election results for Rutherford2
Year	Republican		Democratic		Third party(ies)	
Year	No.	%	No.	%	No.	%
2020	4,008	38.86%	6,073	58.88%	234	2.27%
2014	1,850	40.19%	2,645	57.46%	108	2.35%
2013	1,294	41.37%	1,802	57.61%	32	1.02%
2008	3,630	44.48%	4,426	54.23%	105	1.29%

== Emergency services ==
=== Police ===

The Rutherford Police Department (RPD) provides emergency and protective services to the borough of Rutherford. The RPD consists of 40 officers. The current chief is John Russo who was appointed on March 26, 2013. The RPD responds to approximately 24,000 calls per year and conducts criminal investigations through its detective bureau.

The police department was originally organized in June 1879 as the Rutherford Protective and Detective Association.

=== Fire ===
The Rutherford Fire Department (RFD) is an all-volunteer fire department. The RFD was organized in May 1871 and consists of one Chief, one deputy chief and three assistant chiefs. There are five fire companies in three fire houses. Each company has a Captain and a Lieutenant. The department is staffed by 75 fully trained firefighters. The RFD utilizes three Engines, a Ladder truck, a Heavy Rescue, a Special Service Unit and two boats.

Two of Rutherford's firefighters—Edwin L. Ward in 1965 and Thomas E. Dunn in 1994—have died in the line of duty.

=== Ambulance ===

The Rutherford First Aid-Ambulance Corps is a volunteer service that was organized in 1949. The corp consists of 40 members that operate under the supervision of the Captain, First Lieutenant and Second Lieutenant. The corps provides basic life support, and is staffed primarily by certified Emergency Medical Technicians. CPR-trained drivers are also sometimes on duty. They operate three Type III ambulances.

== Education ==
The Rutherford School District serves the borough's public school students in pre-kindergarten through twelfth grade. As of the 2023–24 school year, the district, comprised of five schools, had an enrollment of 2,544 students and 225.5 classroom teachers (on an FTE basis), for a student–teacher ratio of 11.3:1. Schools in the district (with 2023–24 enrollment data from the National Center for Education Statistics) are Lincoln School with 484 students in grades PreK–3, Washington School with 319 students in grades 1–3, Pierrepont School with 568 students in grades 4–6, Union School with 384 students in grades 7–8 and Rutherford High School with 736 students in grades 9–12.

Public education began in Rutherford prior to 1900, but the oldest permanent school structure was the Park School, built in 1902 on Park Avenue. In 1938, the former Park Junior High School was purchased for $50,000 and converted for use as Rutherford borough hall.

Rutherford formerly had three "neighborhood" schools for grades K–5 (Washington, Lincoln, and Sylvan) which fed into two "magnet" schools for 6–8. The magnet schools also served as elementary schools for their neighborhoods. Sylvan School was closed at the end of the 2004–2005 school year and has become a handicapped preschool, as well as office space for the special services department.

Public school students from the borough, and all of Bergen County, are eligible to attend the secondary education programs offered by the Bergen County Technical Schools, which include the Bergen County Academies in Hackensack, and the Bergen Tech campus in Teterboro or Paramus. The district offers programs on a shared-time or full-time basis, with admission based on a selective application process and tuition covered by the student's home school district.

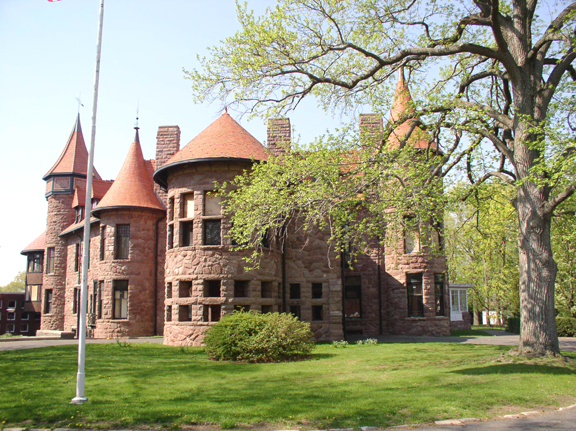
Iviswold Castle located on the Felician College campus.

St. Mary's Roman Catholic Church was established in Rutherford in the 1890s and opened a school shortly thereafter. The parish offers The Academy at Saint Mary for preschool through eighth grade and St. Mary High School, founded in 1929. Both schools are operated under the auspices of the Roman Catholic Archdiocese of Newark.

In 1942, Fairleigh Dickinson University was founded in Rutherford as a two-year college, anchored by the Iviswold Castle on Montross Avenue, which was built in the 1880s as a summer home by David B. Ivison. After FDU expanded to a four-year college and then to offering graduate programs, it acquired other, larger campuses, and eventually left Rutherford, offering the campus for sale due to financial difficulties. In the fall of 1997, the Rutherford campus was purchased by Felician College, an independent private Roman Catholic institution, which often has cultural and community events.

== Transportation ==
=== Roads and highways ===
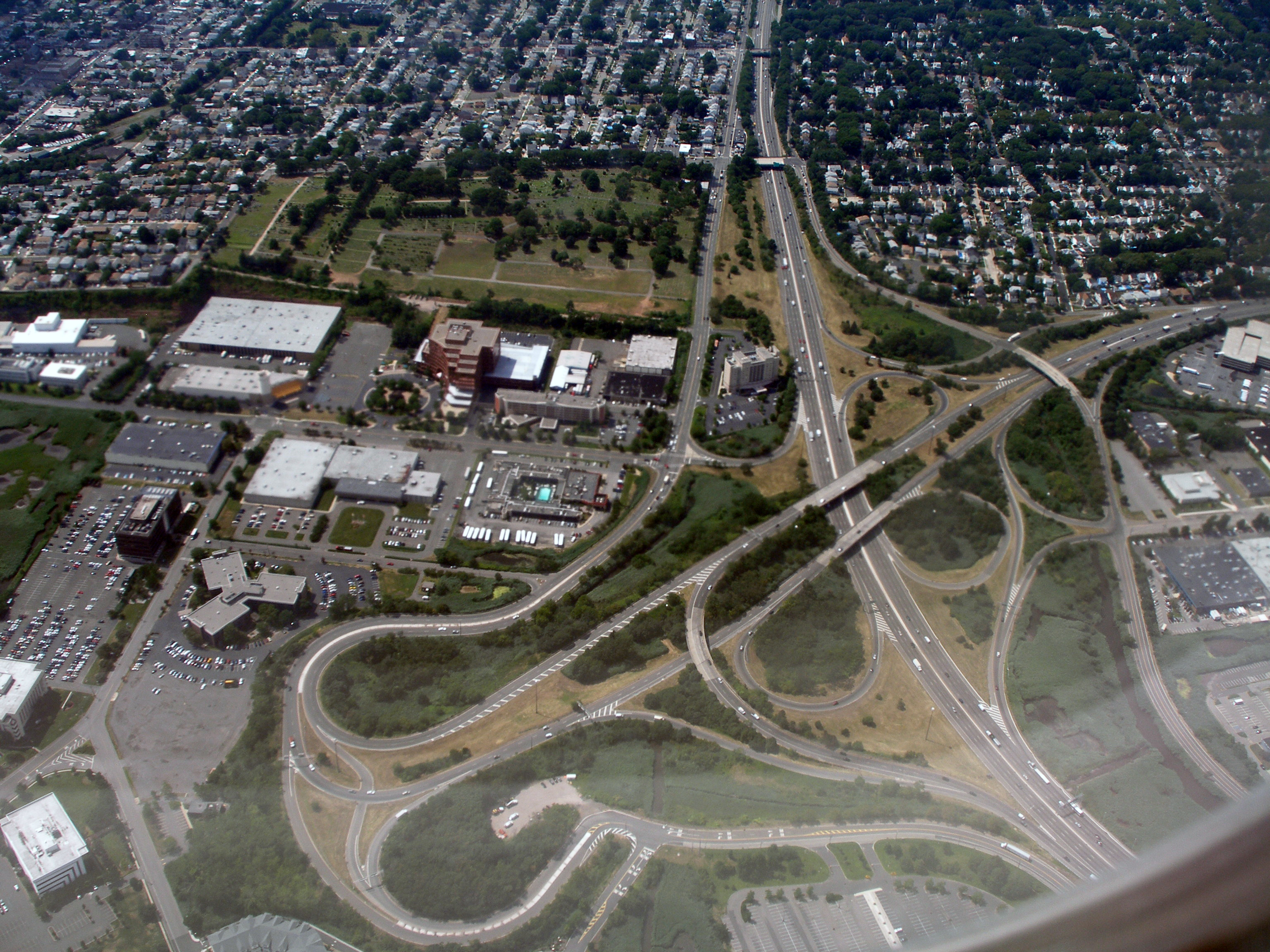
Intersection of Route 3 and Route 17 in Rutherford

As of May 2010, the borough had a total of 46.84 miles (75.38 km) of roadways, of which 36.52 miles (58.77 km) were maintained by the municipality, 6.48 miles (10.43 km) by Bergen County, 3.36 miles (5.41 km) by the New Jersey Department of Transportation and 0.48 miles (0.77 km) by the New Jersey Turnpike Authority.

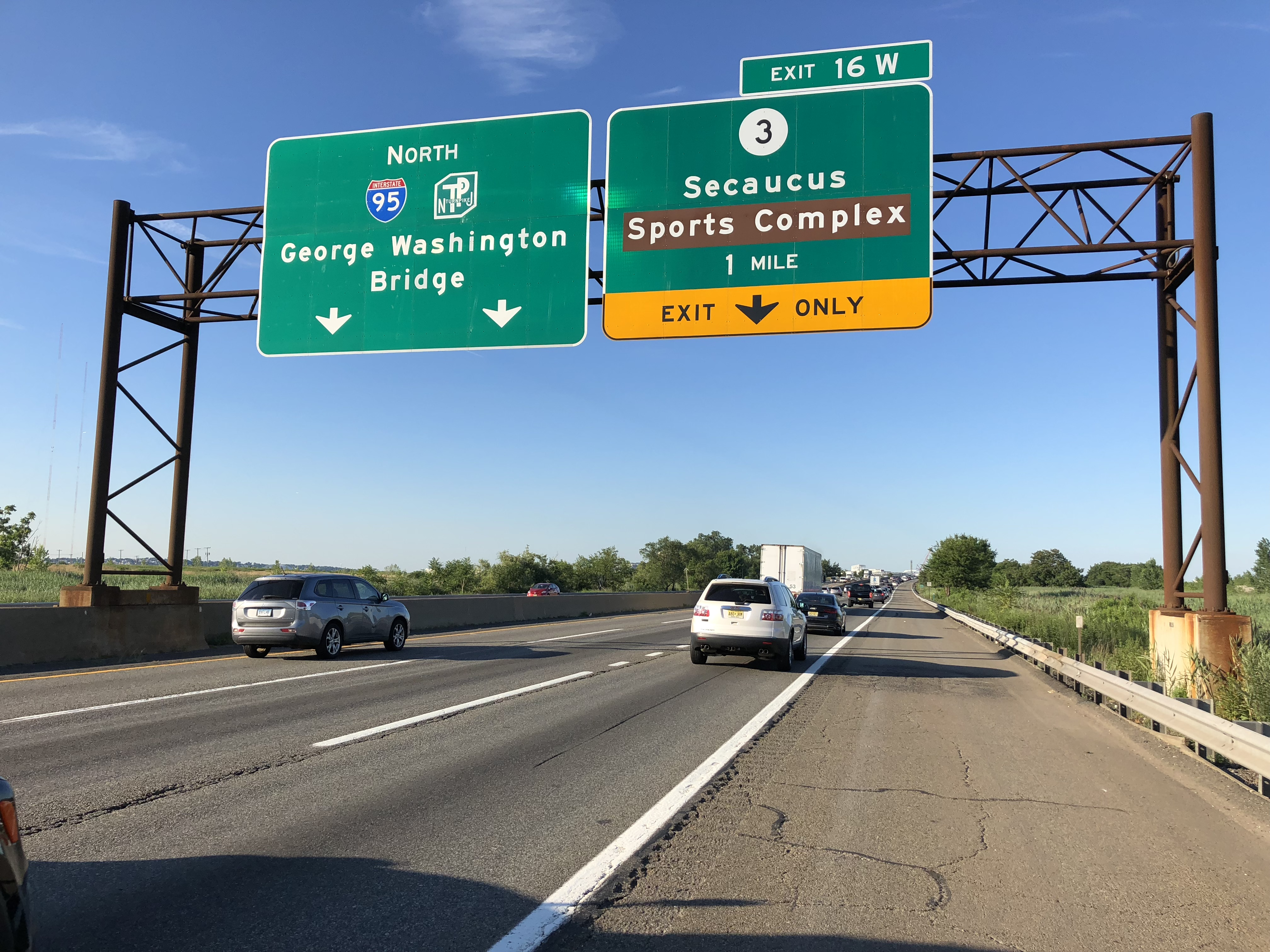
The New Jersey Turnpike Western Spur (Interstate 95) northbound in Rutherford

In the 1920s, the original Route 17 came through downtown Rutherford. Following the 1927 New Jersey State Highway renumbering, the new New Jersey Route 2 (later Route 17) was built in 1928, skirting the southeast edge of the borough, between the residential area and the New Jersey Meadowlands.

In 1948, a new bypass road along the southwest edge of the borough was built to bring traffic from Clifton and points west to the Lincoln Tunnel. The construction of the highway spur Route S3 (now Route 3) caused the demolition or relocation of numerous borough homes. In 2013, the Route 3 bridge over the Passaic River was replaced, and further improvements were made to the Rutherford section of the highway. The swing span of the Union Avenue Bridge over the Passaic was replaced in June 2002 as part of a $9.5 million project.

A short portion of the New Jersey Turnpike Western Spur (Interstate 95) passes through the southern section of Rutherford, but the closest interchange is located in neighboring East Rutherford at exit 16W.

=== Public transportation ===
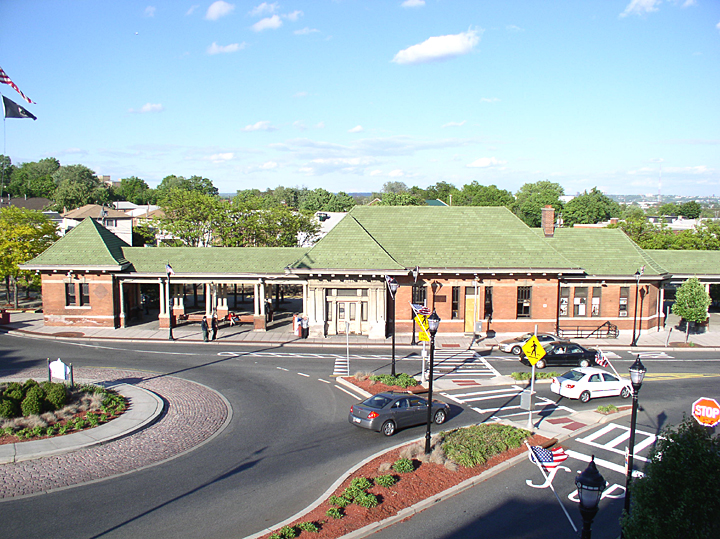
Rutherford Train Station

Thanks to its easy access to New York City by rail, Rutherford became an early bedroom community. Following the initial wave of settlement in the late 19th century, an additional building boom occurred in the 1920s, when the majority of the borough's current housing stock was constructed.

Public Service Railway brought trolley lines into Rutherford around the start of the 20th century. The lines extended east to Jersey City, south to Newark, north to Hackensack, and west to Passaic. By the late 1940s, the trolleys were replaced by bus service.

After the opening of the Lincoln Tunnel in 1937, the Inter-City Bus Company began bus service direct from Paterson to New York City. The line was taken over by NJ Transit in the early 1980s.

Today, NJ Transit offers service to and from New York City's Port Authority Bus Terminal in Midtown Manhattan on several routes. The 163 offers rush hour service only, as Rutherford is not typically along its route. The 190 offers local service along Union Avenue and Orient Way. The 191, 192 and 195 routes all serve the portion of Rutherford that is adjacent to Route 3, as well as the portion of Route 17 that goes through Rutherford. The 76 bus provides service between Hackensack and Newark.

Rutherford's train station, which was built by the Erie Railroad in 1898, serves passengers on NJ Transit's Bergen County Line. Service is available to Suffern and various stations along Metro-North Railroad's Port Jervis Line, as well as all other Bergen County Line stations as Rutherford is the last stop before Secaucus Junction. Service is also provided to Hoboken Terminal with connections to Hudson–Bergen Light Rail, PATH, and NY Waterway service, and customers can connect at Secaucus for trains to New York Penn Station, Newark Liberty International Airport, and points west and south along the Morris & Essex Lines, North Jersey Coast Line, Northeast Corridor Line, and Montclair-Boonton Line. Access to the Raritan Valley Line is available at either Hoboken or at Newark Penn Station via Secaucus.

== Sources ==
- Municipal Incorporations of the State of New Jersey (according to Counties) prepared by the Division of Local Government, Department of the Treasury (New Jersey); December 1, 1958.
- Clayton, W. Woodford; and Nelson, William. History of Bergen and Passaic Counties, New Jersey, with Biographical Sketches of Many of its Pioneers and Prominent Men., Philadelphia: Everts and Peck, 1882.
- Harvey, Cornelius Burnham (ed.), Genealogical History of Hudson and Bergen Counties, New Jersey. New York: New Jersey Genealogical Publishing Co., 1900.
- Neumann, William. Rutherford, Arcadia Publishing, 2012. ISBN 9780738597720.
- Van Valen, James M. History of Bergen County, New Jersey. New York: New Jersey Publishing and Engraving Co., 1900.
- Westervelt, Frances A. (Frances Augusta), 1858–1942, History of Bergen County, New Jersey, 1630–1923, Lewis Historical Publishing Company, 1923.
