= New Barbadoes Township, New Jersey =

Coordinates: 40.89°N 74.05°W

New Barbadoes Township was a township that was formed in 1710 and existed in its largest extent prior to the American Revolutionary War in Bergen County, New Jersey. The Township was created from territories that had been part of Essex County that were transferred by royal decree to Bergen County. After many departures, secessions and deannexations over the centuries, New Barbadoes Township exists presently as Hackensack, which adopted its present name in 1921.

The township was named for the English colony of Barbados. Soon after the English annexation of the Dutch province of New Netherland in 1664, Philip Cartaret, governor of what became the proprietary colony of East Jersey, granted land to Captain John Berry in the area known as Achter Kol He soon began residence there and called it "New Barbadoes", having previously resided on the Caribbean island. The original land patent encompassed the area between the Hackensack River and the Saddle River. The early colonial owner is recalled in the name of a stream in the New Jersey Meadowlands, Berrys Creek, and the historic Yereance-Berry House.

As constituted originally, the Township included all of present-day Bergen County west of the Hackensack River, including portions beyond the Passaic River, and added the whole territory between the two rivers from Newark Bay once known as New Barbadoes Neck (including the western part of present-day Hudson County), northward to the boundary with New York and west to the boundary line of Sussex County.

In 1716, Saddle River Township was created from all portions of New Barbadoes Township west of the Saddle River. New Barbadoes then consisted of all lands west of the Hackensack River and east of the Passaic and Saddle Rivers.

In 1775, Harrington Township was formed by royal charter from the northern portions of Hackensack Township and New Barbadoes Township.

In 1826 Lodi Township was formed from the southern portion of New Barbadoes Township.

In 1871, Midland Township (now Rochelle Park) was created from the northern portions of New Barbadoes Township.

The Hackensack Commission was formed within New Barbadoes Township in 1868. New Barbadoes Township remained in existence until 1921 when it was replaced by the City of Hackensack.

== Sources ==
- "History of Bergen County, New Jersey, 1630-1923;" by "Westervelt, Frances A. (Frances Augusta), 1858-1942."
- "Municipal Incorporations of the State of New Jersey (according to Counties)" prepared by the Division of Local Government, Department of the Treasury (New Jersey); December 1, 1958.
