= New Barbadoes Neck =

Coordinates: 40.707°N 74.112°W

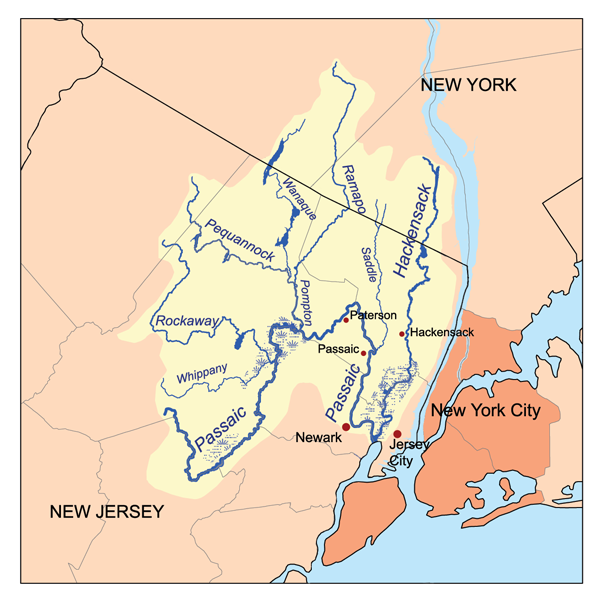
New Barbadoes Neck is between the Hackensack and Passaic Rivers

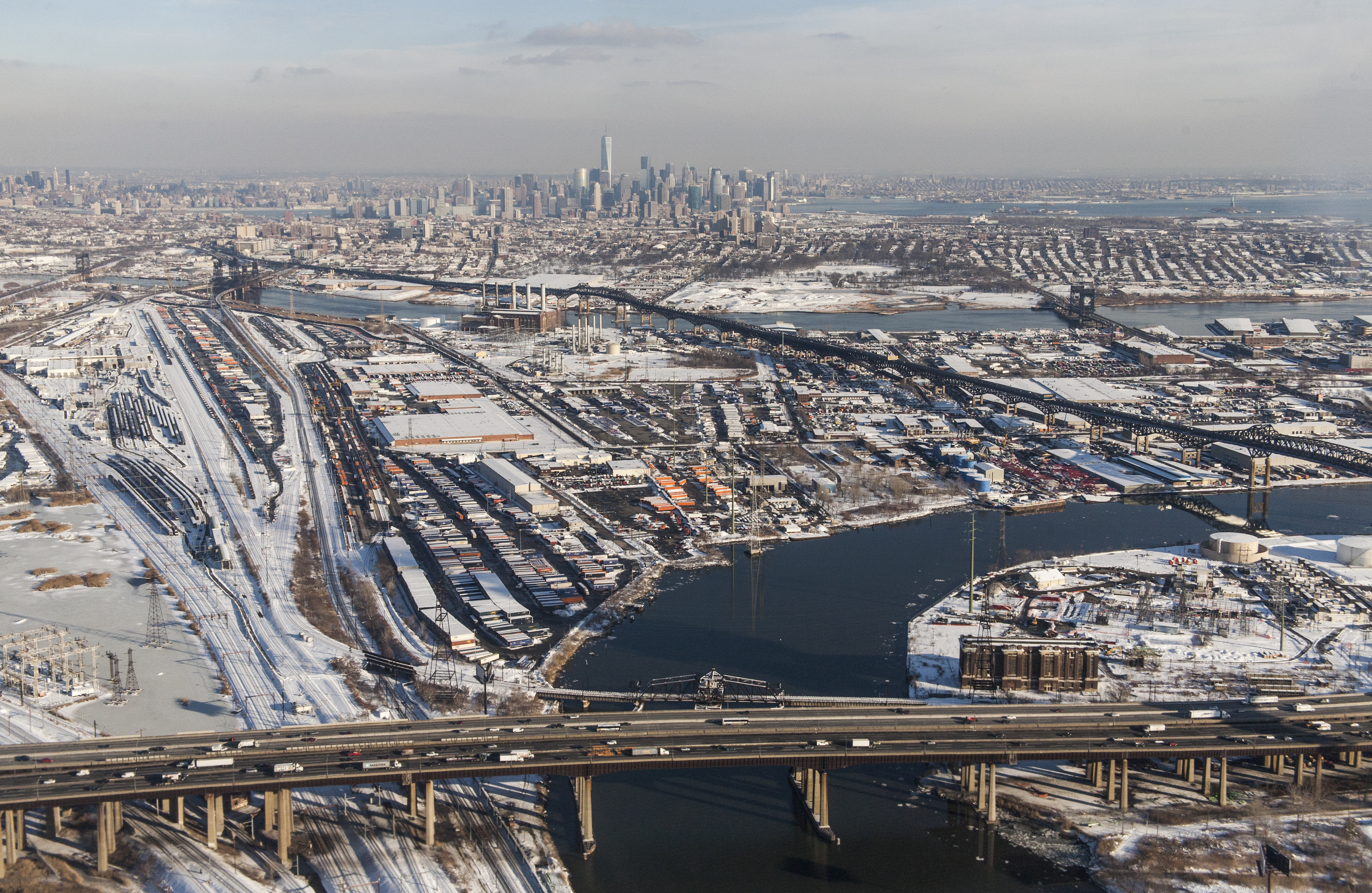
The southern end of New Barbadoes Neck is now known as South Kearny, with the tip known as Kearny Point

New Barbadoes Neck is the name given in the colonial era for the peninsula in northeastern New Jersey, US between the lower Hackensack and Passaic Rivers, in what is now western Hudson County and southern Bergen County. The neck begins in the south at Kearny Point in the Newark Bay and is characterized by a ridge (creating the valley of the Passaic) along the west and part of the New Jersey Meadowlands (the flood plain of the Hackensack) on the east.

== Native Americans and Netherlanders ==
The neck was part of an area called Meghgectecock by the Lenape. It was the territory of the group called the Hackensack. The name of masgichteu-cunk meaning where May-apples grow, from a moist-woodland perennial that bears edible yellow berries. The name Achter Col was given during the New Netherland era in the mid-17th century, and can be translated a rear mountain pass or behind the ridge, in reference to the access it provided to the hinterlands beyond the Hudson Palisades that were rich fur-trapping grounds.

== British land grants ==
After the surrender of Fort Amsterdam by the Dutch in 1664, the area became part of the proprietary Province of New Jersey during the period of British colonization of North America. On July 4, 1668, William Sandford obtained a grant of 15,308 acres (62 km^{2}) from the proprietors. In the grant document, the name of the area was recorded as "New Barbados." As was the custom of the times, Sandford paid Chief Tantaqua of the Hackensack Indians 20 English Pounds Sterling for all their reserve rights and titles. On June 10, 1669, John Berry obtained a grant of 10,000 acres (40 km^{2}) to the north of Sandford's grant. In 1671, Sandford's grant was divided between him and his uncle Nathaniel Kingsland of Barbados, with Sandford owning the southern third of the tract and Kingsland the northern two-thirds. The Kingsland tract was settled by Nathaniel's nephew Isaac Kingsland about 1683. From 1668 to 1687, New Barbadoes was part of Newark Township.

The Sandford family is recalled locally in Sandford Avenue in Harrison and Kearny. The Kingsland family is recalled in the Kingsland Station, Kingsland Avenue in Lyndhurst, and Kingsland Manor. Berry is recalled in the names of Berrys Creek, and the historic Yereance-Berry House. A portion was later sold to an early settler to Pavonia, New Netherland, Walling Van Winkle.

== New Barbadoes Township ==
The township was created in 1710 and encompassed all of the neck as well as lands to the north and west to the Saddle River. At this time, the territory was transferred from Essex County and made part of an expanded Bergen County.

== Copper mine and steam engine ==
In 1710, Kingsland sold a tract for 300 English Pounds Sterling to Captain Arent Schuyler – a former trader and Indian agent and, a member of the influential Schuyler family. The new purchase included present-day Kearny, North Arlington and Lyndhurst. Following his death in 1730, his sons inherited the land. After Schuyler's purchase of his new homestead, it was discovered the ground contained copper, which led to the opening of the Schuyler Copper Mine. After it became flooded, the first steam engine in America was developed and used to pump out the deep mine shaft. The engine was secretly built by the engineer Josiah Hornblower. The engine and mines were destroyed by fire in 1768 and remained idle for some years. Schuyler Avenue, which runs along the eastern edge of the ridge honors the early settlement.

== Revolutionary era ==
Lord Howe of England took possession of New York Harbor and the proximity of Schuyler Mansion drew many of his officers who traveled over a road known today as the Belleville Turnpike. It had originally been laid in 1759 with cedar logs from the nearby swamps. In September 1777, Henry Clinton, head of the British Expeditionary Forces in America, selected Schuyler Mansion for his headquarters during one of his more important raiding operations, including those along Second River.

== 19th-century civic borders ==
In the 19th century, the Neck came under the jurisdiction of different townships and in 1840 part of the newly created Hudson County.

== Meadowlands development and preservation ==
A large portion of the peninsula has, since 1968, been part of the New Jersey Meadowlands District.

== See also ==
- Bergen Neck
