= John Berry (New Jersey governor) =

American politician

Deputy Governor of New Jersey
- Governor: Philip Carteret
- In office May 1672 – July 1673
- Preceded by: Office created
- Succeeded by: Office abolished by Dutch Reconquest

Personal details
- Born: c. 1619
- Died: c. 1712 Province of New Jersey
- Spouse: Francina
- Children: Richard, Francina, Sarah, Hannah, John
- Occupation: Mariner, Planter, Politician

John Berry (c. 1619 (Note: Some sources indicate his year of birth was 1635.) – c. 1712) was an English colonist who migrated from Barbados to become an early major landowner, militia officer and Deputy Governor under the Lords Proprietor of the Proprietary Colony of New Jersey.

== Career ==
Soon after British annexation of the Dutch province of New Netherland in 1664, Philip Carteret, governor of the proprietary colony of New Jersey, granted land to Captain John Berry in the area formerly known as Achter Kol. He soon took up residence and called it "New Barbadoes," having previously resided on the island of Barbados. The land patent encompassed area between the Hackensack River and Saddle River in what is now Bergen County, New Jersey.

From 1672 to 1673, Berry was the Deputy Governor of the Province of New Jersey while Governor Philip Carteret was in England.

He later served in the East New Jersey Provincial Council through 1692. On 22 March 1679/80, Carteret designated Berry to succeed him as governor, with Councillor William Sandford designated to succeed Berry in the event of his inability to serve.

== Personal life ==
Berry was married to Francina, with whom he had at least five children, including: Richard, Francina, Sarah, Hannah, John Berry.

=== Legacy ===
He is recalled in the name of a stream in the New Jersey Meadowlands, Berrys Creek, his descendants owned the historic Yereance-Berry House.
