= EnCap =

EnCap was a proposal to build golf courses and homes on remediated landfills in the New Jersey Meadowlands in three communities in Bergen County, New Jersey, United States: Lyndhurst, North Arlington and Rutherford.

In November 2007, Donald Trump announced a deal in which he would take over development of the troubled project. Trump's proposal included a world-class golf course designed by Tom Fazio, homes and a hotel.

On May 27, 2008, the New Jersey Meadowlands Commission terminated its agreement with EnCap Golf Holdings, the company that had the contract to redevelop the 785-acre (3.18 km^{2}) site, after the company had missed targets to clean up the landfills as part of the project.
