= Yereance–Berry House =

Historic house in New Jersey, United States

- U.S. National Register of Historic Places
- New Jersey Register of Historic Places
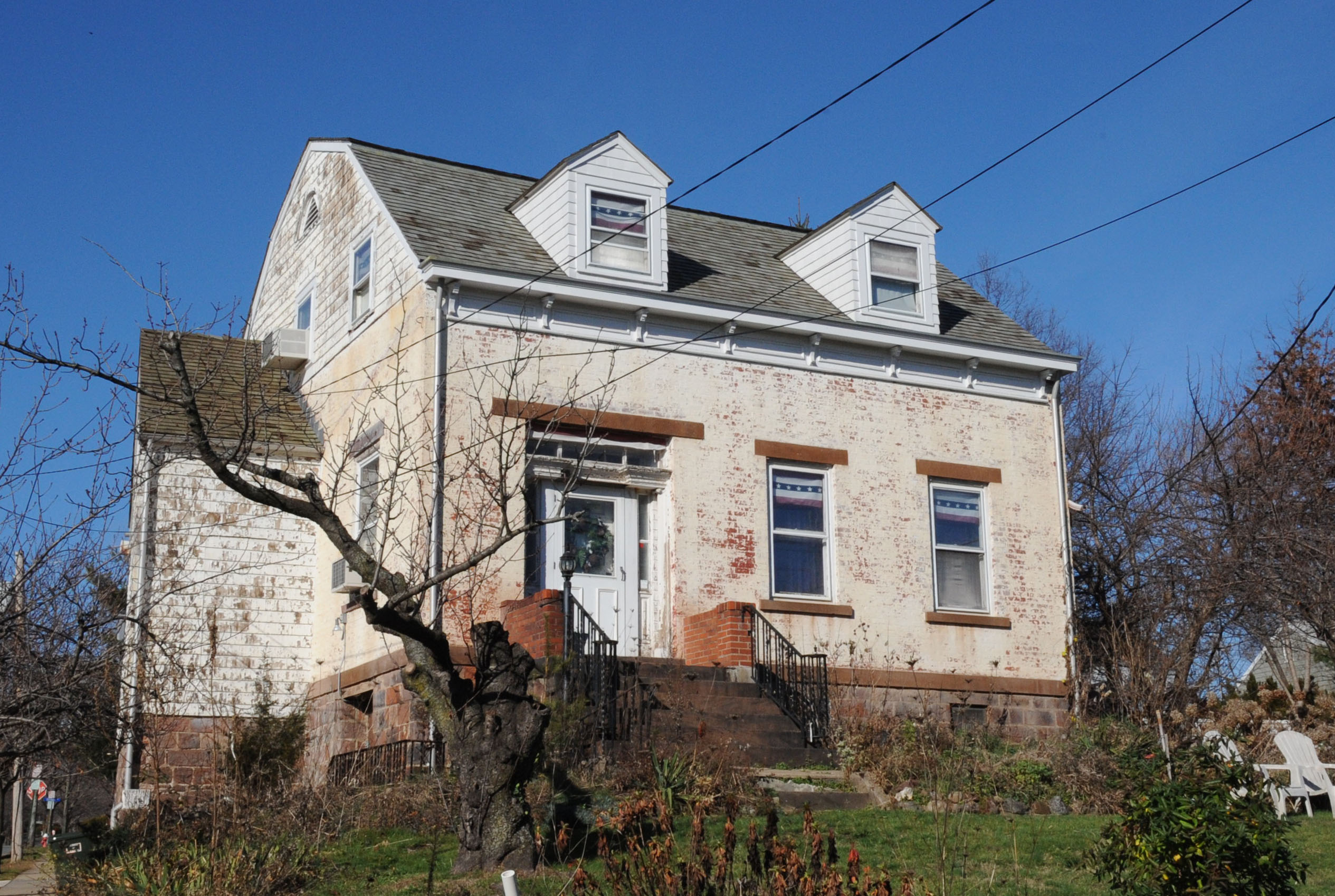
- The Yereance–Berry House

- Location within Bergen County, New Jersey
- Location: 91 Crane Avenue Rutherford, New Jersey
- Coordinates: 40°48′56″N 74°6′16″W
- Area: less than one acre
- MPS: Stone Houses of Bergen County TR
- NRHP reference No.: 83001594
- NJRHP No.: 670

Significant dates
- Added to NRHP: January 10, 1983
- Designated NJRHP: October 3, 1980

The Yereance–Berry House is a stone house built in the early 19th century in what is now Rutherford, in Bergen County, New Jersey, United States. It was placed on the National Register of Historic Places on January 10, 1983, and is currently home to the Meadowlands Museum.

The house, 91 Crane Avenue at the corner of Meadow Road at the edge of the New Jersey Meadowlands, was inventoried by the Historic American Buildings Survey of the Library of Congress in 1938. At that time, the house was believed to have been built in 1804 and was known variously as the John W. Berry House or the Juria Jurianson House. The Yereance name came from the Yereance family, which at one time owned much of the property in the vicinity of the house. (There is a now-decommissioned Yereance Avenue two blocks north of the house.) However, Rutherford historian Frederick Bunker, in a 1979 report to the Meadowlands Museum, indicated that there was no evidence that a Yereance had ever owned the house.

The Historic American Buildings Survey report (#6-468) said that the house was built by John W. Berry, a direct descendant of Major John Berry, who obtained land grants from Governor of New Jersey Philip Carteret in 1668. Berry had previously lived in Barbados and named his grants New Barbadoes, a name that remained in official use until 1826. Berrys Creek is also named after Major Berry.

Bunker undertook a deed search of the property at the museum's request. While Bunker was unable to determine an actual construction date, he concluded that the house was likely built in 1818 by Brant Van Blarcom and his wife, the former Getty Van Riper, a daughter of the previous landowner Jacob Van Riper, who died on or about July 8, 1807. The Van Riper homestead was near the Passaic River, across a ridge from Meadow Road. Getty Van Blarcom received the property in 1817 as the result of an orphan's court proceeding that divided Jacob's property.

William Berry, who was a direct descendant of John Berry, purchased the property in 1867 for his son Stephen and his wife Margaret. Stephen died in 1872 and Margaret died in 1882; the house was sold at auction in 1891 and was owned by Charles Smithson at the time of the Historic American Buildings Survey. By that time, a new kitchen had been built on the west side of the house, replacing a kitchen that was removed because it was in the right of way of Crane Avenue, which was officially extended east to Meadow Road in the 1930s.

The house was purchased by the Rutherford Museum (now the Meadowlands Museum) in 1974, and the museum has maintained the house in addition to commissioning research on its provenance. In 1983, the house was re-surveyed for the Bergen County Stone House Survey (#0256-1), through which it achieved its placement on the National Register of Historic Places.

The structure is composed of a brownstone foundation, with brownstone extending up to the water table and brick above it. The interior walls are brick, covered with plaster, and there are interior chimneys made of brick. The house has a gambrel roof.

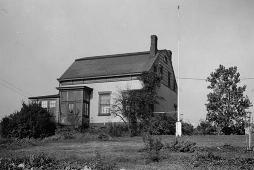
The Yereance–Berry House in 1938

== See also ==
- National Register of Historic Places listings in Bergen County, New Jersey
