= Daniel Van Winkle =

- Born: March 9, 1816; Rutherford, New Jersey
- Died: January 16, 1886 (aged 69); Rutherford, New Jersey
- Occupation: Land developer
- Known for: Developing multiple tracts of land in the South Bergen County area, donating land for public use.

Daniel Van Winkle (March 9, 1816 – January 16, 1886) opened a real estate office at Depot Square (now Station Square) to sell the land of the Rutherfurd Park Association, and laid out the street grid pattern for the town of Rutherford, New Jersey. Daniel also donated land in 1866 for a train station to be built to service the Rutherford area. Daniel Van Winkle also lived in the Kip Homestead for a number of years.
