= Rose Rudnitski =

Education professor and administrator

Rose A. Rudnitski is an American educator, scholar, and higher-education administrator who works on social justice and equity in teacher preparation and educational leadership. She is a Distinguished Professor of Education and Program Director of Educational Leadership at Mercy University. Her academic career includes senior faculty and administrative roles at the State University of New York at New Paltz, Felician University, and Mercy. She has published on curriculum, gifted education, teacher preparation, and teaching about genocide and intolerance.

== Early life and education ==
Rudnitski earned a Bachelor of Arts degree in music from the State University of New York at Oneonta in 1972. She later completed a Master of Education (Ed.M., 1988) and Doctor of Education (Ed.D., 1991) in Curriculum and Teaching at Teachers College, Columbia University. Her doctoral dissertation, A Generation of Leaders for Gifted Education, was a longitudinal study of a U.S. Department of Education leadership program. She also earned an M.A. in Religious Studies from Saint Joseph's Seminary in 2013 and completed the Boston College Institute for Administrators in Catholic Higher Education in 2015.

== Academic career ==
Rudnitski began her career as a K–12 teacher in Norwich, New York, where she developed gifted programs and taught music, remedial reading, and mathematics (1972–1990). She later joined Teachers College, Columbia University, as an instructor and graduate assistant in curriculum and teaching (1990–1991).

She held faculty positions at Trinity University (1991–1992) and later joined the State University of New York at New Paltz, where she became Associate Professor (1995), was granted continuing appointment (1996), and eventually became Professor of Education and Professor Emerita (2012). At SUNY New Paltz she served as department chair, associate dean, assessment and accreditation coordinator, ombudsman, presiding officer of the faculty, and chair of multiple governance committees.

From 2012 to 2017, Rudnitski was Dean of the School of Education at Felician University. She then became Dean of the School of Education at Mercy University (2017–2019), later continuing as Professor of Education and Program Director of Educational Leadership.

== Research and scholarly contributions ==
Rudnitski's research focuses on curriculum history, leadership for social justice, teacher education, gifted education policy, and pedagogy for teaching about genocide and intolerance. She has contributed to handbooks, journals, and edited volumes on these topics. Notable works include:

- Integrated Teaching Methods: Theory, Classroom Applications, Field-Based Connections (1995)
- State Policies Regarding Education of the Gifted as Reflected in Legislation and Regulation (1993)
- “National/Provincial Policies on Gifted Education” in International Handbook of Research on Giftedness and Talent (2000)
- “Patti Smith Hill” in They Led by Teaching (2003)
- “Guidelines for Teaching about Genocide and Intolerance” (1999, reprinted 2000)

Her articles have appeared in journals such as Roeper Review, Gifted Education International, Education and Culture, and Adolescence. Her later projects included studies of Huguenot “cyphering books” (1729–1830) and historical analyses of democratic schooling.

== Professional service and consultancy ==
Rudnitski has served as president of the Collegiate Association of Departments of Educational Administration (CADEA), participated in Education Deans for Justice and Equity (EDJE), and contributed to national and state advisory groups on teacher education, assessment, and gifted education.

== Awards and recognition ==
- Chancellor's Award for Excellence in Faculty Service, State University of New York (2009)
- Outstanding Service in Assessment, SUNY New Paltz (2008)
- Exemplary Service Award as Chair of Educational Administration, SUNY New Paltz (2006)
- Hackman Research Residency Fellowship, New York State Archives (2002–2003)
- Multiple SUNY and external grants for curriculum and teacher education (1990s–2000s)
- First Place Award, New York State Media Festival, for Holocaust education project (1988)
- Artist-in-Residence grants from the New York Foundation for the Arts and New York State Council on the Arts

== Selected publications ==
- Frazee, B., & Rudnitski, R. A. (1995). Integrated teaching methods: Theory, classroom applications, field-based connections. Albany, NY: Delmar Publishers.
- Passow, A. H., & Rudnitski, R. A. (1993). State policies regarding education of the gifted as reflected in legislation and regulation. Storrs, CT: The National Research Center of the Gifted and Talented.
- Garrati, M., & Rudnitski, R. (2007). “American Adolescents’ Views on War and Peace in the Early Stages of the Iraq Conflict.” Adolescence, 42(167), Fall 2007, 501–523.
- Rudnitski, R. A. (2003). “Patti Smith Hill.” In S. Field & M. Berson (Eds.), They led by teaching. Indianapolis, IN: Kappa Delta Pi.
- Rudnitski, R. A. (2000). “National/Provincial Policies on Gifted Education.” In K. Heller, F. Monks, R. Sternberg, & R. Subotnik (Eds.), International Handbook of Research on Giftedness and Talent. Amsterdam: Elsevier Science.
- Caporino, G., & Rudnitski, R. (1999). “Guidelines for Teaching about Genocide and Intolerance.” In Danks, C. & Rabinsky, L. Teaching for a Tolerant World: Grades 9–12. Urbana, IL: National Council of Teachers of English. Reprinted in Robinson, J. (2000). Teaching for a Tolerant World: Elementary Grades.
