= Bergen, New Jersey =

Bergen, New Jersey may refer to:

- Bergen County, New Jersey, the northeasternmost county in New Jersey.
- Bergen City, New Jersey, a former city annexed by Jersey City, New Jersey.
- Bergen Section, Jersey City, a current neighborhood of Jersey City, New Jersey.
- Bergen Township, New Jersey (1661–1862), a former township in Hudson County, New Jersey.
- Bergen Township, New Jersey (1893–1902), a former township in Bergen County, New Jersey.
- Bergen, New Netherland, the origin of the New Jersey settlement
