= Congregation Beth-El (Rutherford, New Jersey) =

Orthodox synagogue in Rutherford, New Jersey

Coordinates: 40°49′57″N 74°06′40″W

Congregation Beth-El is an Orthodox synagogue and community center in Rutherford, New Jersey.

It was founded in 1919 as South Bergen Hebrew Institute of East Rutherford. The congregation constructed its main building in 1955 behind an existing circa 1885 Queen Anne Victorian mansion it owned at 185 Montross Avenue in Rutherford. The house was kept to serve as the rabbi's residence.

The synagogue's mid-20th century records are kept in a collection at Rutgers University Library in New Brunswick, New Jersey.

== History ==
The synagogue first organized High Holiday services in 1919 in a rented auditorium, but met throughout the rest of the year in Carlstadt, at a drug store. They hired a rabbi and put up their own building in 1921, on Park Avenue in East Rutherford. By 1946, with 700 members, the synagogue was outgrowing the Park Avenue building.

At the time affiliated with the Conservative movement of Judaism, the synagogue changed its name to Temple Beth El, the Jewish Center of South Bergen in 1951, but sometimes known as Rutherford Jewish Center, or the Community Jewish Center. By 1953, under leadership of Rabbi Lawrence Gersein, purchased the Carl Dannheim mansion at 185 Montross Avenue in Rutherford, and did the ground-breaking for the new building behind the house. The building was completed in 1955, though the congregation had moved to the location in 1953.

From 2009 to 2014, the synagogue, now Orthodox, was led by Neil and Pessy Schuman. In 2012, the Dannheim mansion, where the rabbi's family lived, was firebombed in an antisemitic incident. Neil Schuman (also known as Nosson Schuman), put out most of the fire, sustaining second degree burns to his hands, and successfully evacuated his 7-member family, along with his wife's visiting parents. Aakash Dalal and Anthony Graziano were convicted on charges of terrorism in 2016, in separate trials. The two had committed a string of other attacks against Jewish institutions in the two months leading up to the Beth-El attack.

In 2014, a Chabad-Lubavitch couple, Rabbi and Mrs. Yitzchok Lerman, took over from the Schumans. They renamed the synagogue Congregation Beth-El Chabad, and made it the cornerstone of a wider-reaching organization, Chabad of South Bergen and the Meadowlands. They added services for Jewish students at Felician University, which has a campus one block away from Beth-El. Yitzchok Lerman is also a professor at the Rabbinical College of America and a military reserve chaplain who trains other chaplains for the United States Air Force.

In 2025, a fire, not believed suspicious, destroyed the entire synagogue complex. The rabbi's family escaped a few minutes before the entire structure collapsed. He had tried to re-enter the synagogue to save their collection of Torah scrolls, but was unable to. The following Saturday, the synagogue held Shabbat services in tents set up on the property's lawn by the city government, and using religious articles (Torah scroll and religious books) on loan form the nearby Orthodox community in Passaic.
