= Robert Sandford (explorer) =

English explorer

Robert Sandford was an English explorer of the Province of Carolina in the 17th century on behalf of the eight Lords Proprietor of the Province of Carolina. He followed Captain William Hilton in the search for sites on the Carolina coast for establishing English settlements after the charter of 1663. Both Sandford and Hilton's expeditions were based in Barbados, and Sandford was patronized by English planters in Barbados, including James Drax.

== Youth and early career ==
Sandford was born in Hamburg in 1632, the son of merchant adventurer Thomas Sandford and his wife Elizabeth Kingsland. He and his brother, William, moved to Barbados as children around 1642, and Sandford stated he was ignorant of English ways in a pamphlet he wrote called Suriname Justice. His uncle was Major Nathaniel Kingsland, settler of Barbados.

In 1661-62 Robert Sandford ran afoul of Governor William Byam and was manacled, fined and exiled from Suriname without trial. Byam accused Sandford that under the cover of a mission to recover runaway slaves he threatened to go to St Vincent with the soldiers and native-born Americans. Sandford accused Byam and his associate, George Marten, of crimes against the rights of the settlers as Englishmen, and of "atheism, license, and abuse of due process". In November 1664, he was created agent and secretary for Clarindon County, Carolina for Lord Proprietor Sir John Colleton.

== Exploration of Carolina coast ==
As an explorer following William Hilton, Robert Sandford was responsible for the first footing expedition from the Caribbean to the Carolinas. Hilton's voyage took place in 1663, and Sandford's in 1666. Both explored the Port Royal area, and Sandford gave the name of one of the Lords Proprietors, Anthony Ashley Cooper, 1st Earl of Shaftesbury, to the Ashley River on his exploration in 1666. Hilton and Sandford both praised the area for it fertility and suitability, Sandford saying, "[W]ee doe assure Our selves that a Colony of English here planted, with a moderate support in their Infant tendency, would in a very short time improve themselves to a perfect Common Wealth … which for its Scite and produccons would be of more advantage to … [England and] the King … the any (wee may say all) his other Dominions in America".

In his 1666 expedition, Sandford was sent to explore the Carolina coast. He met with Kiawah people Chief Shadoo and a Cusabo chief on Edisto Island who guided him to Port Royal and who introduced him to the chief there. Proceeding to St. Helena Island, Sandford was presented with a nephew of the chief there to be taught the English language and customs on July 7, 1666. In return he left Dr. Henry Woodward with the St. Helena chief to study the language and customs of the Native Americans there. Sandford's voyage included 17 members other than himself, including Captain George Cary, Lieutenant Samuel Hardy, Lieutenant Joseph Woory, Ensign Henry Brayne, Ensign Richard Abrahall, and Mr. Thomas Giles.

== Later years ==
Barbados Governor Willoughby banished Sandford from Barbados in 1668. He may have moved to the Carolinas, but not necessarily to settle there.
