= Harrison Township, Hudson County, New Jersey =

Coordinates: 40.74752°N 74.15634°W

Historical population
| Census | Pop. | Note | %± |
|---|---|---|---|
| 1850 | 1,114 | | — |
| 1860 | 2,063 | | 85.2% |
Historical census data source:

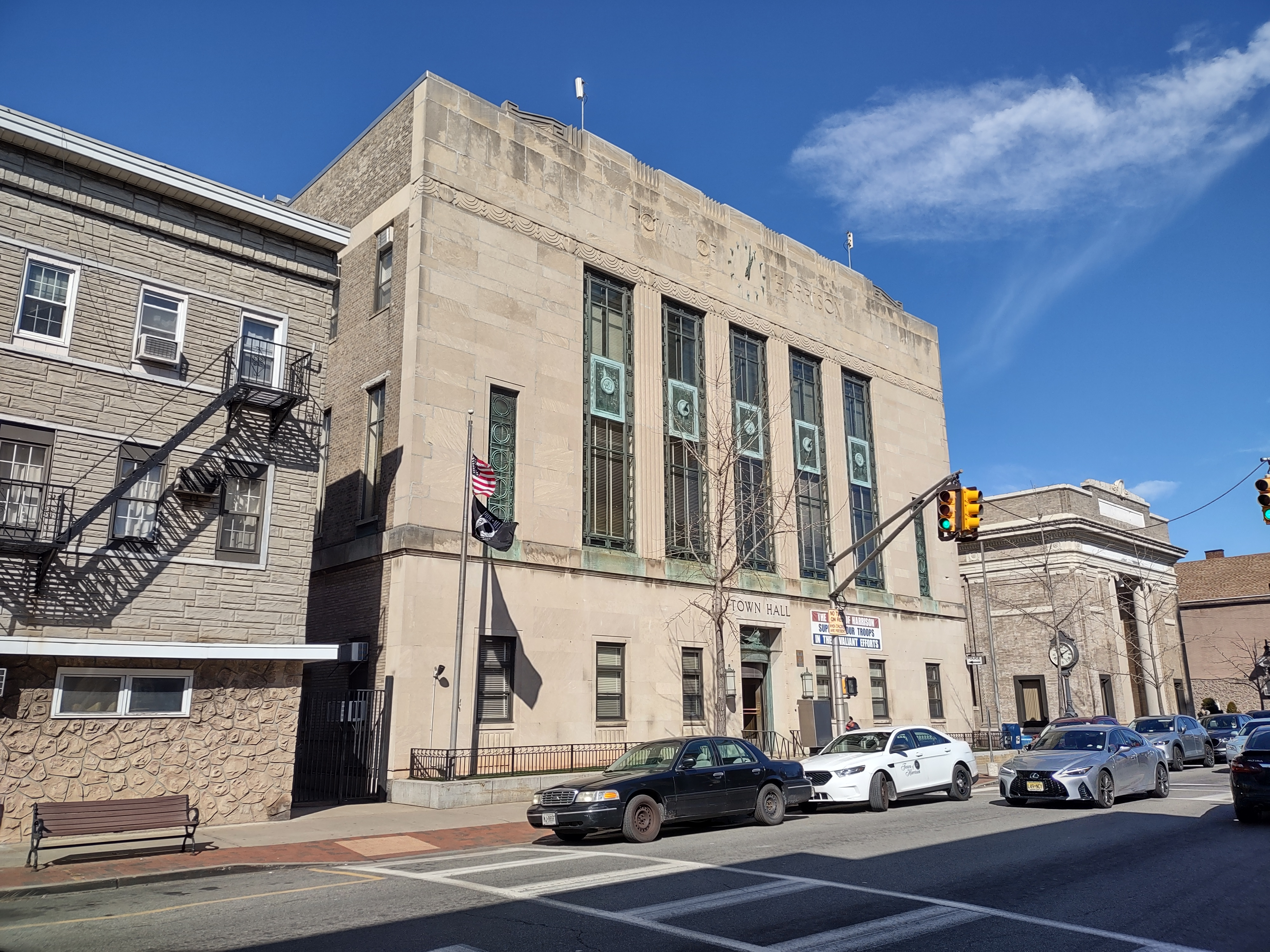
2023 Photo of Harrison Township Hall

Harrison Township was created by an act of the New Jersey Legislature on April 13, 1840, and was part of Hudson County which was created from portions of Bergen County, on February 22, 1840.

Harrison Township was established from the southern portions of Lodi Township. The town lines were Paterson Plank Road which ran along the town's northern boundary, the Hackensack River which ran along the eastern boundary, the Passaic River which ran along the western boundary and southern boundary where it met with the Hackensack River. In 1852, the residents of northern section of the township wished to return to Bergen County and on February 19, 1852, Union Township was created from Harrison Township with its northern boundary being Paterson Plank Road, the southern boundary being the Belleville Turnpike, and having the same east and west boundaries as Harrison Township. During that 1852-1867 period, the township boundaries corresponded to the 1671 bounds of the colonial plantation of William Sandford. Kearny Township was created from parts of the township on April 8, 1867. The remaining section was reincorporated as the town of Harrison, New Jersey on March 25, 1869.
