= Meadowlands Museum =

Museum in Rutherford, New Jersey

Coordinates: 40.815319°N 74.103963°W

- Established: 1961
- Location: 91 Crane Avenue, Rutherford, New Jersey, U.S.
- Type: Local history museum
- Collection size: Over 5,000 artifacts
- Founder: Rutherford Parent-Teacher Association
- Director: Patricia Papalia (as of 2024)
- Website: meadowlandsmuseum.com

The Meadowlands Museum is a museum located in Rutherford, New Jersey. It was established in 1961 as a repository for artifacts relating to the history of Rutherford and the New Jersey Meadowlands region.

== History ==
A group of parents who belonged to the Rutherford Parent-Teacher Association founded the museum. They collected artifacts of natural history, including local mineral specimens, as well as items relating to the area's Native American heritage.

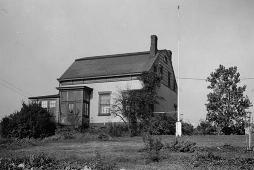
The Yereance-Berry House, 1938.

The first location for the museum was a room at Rutherford's Sylvan School, and the collection was known as the Sylvan School Museum and open to students in the Rutherford public schools. In the late 1960s, the school district needed the classroom space once again, and the museum relocated to an office building on Ames Avenue and called itself the Rutherford Museum.

In 1974, the museum purchased the Yereance-Berry House at Crane Avenue and Meadow Road. The house, most of which was built in the early 19th century, is on the National Register of Historic Places, although a portion of the house was removed when Crane Avenue was built through to Meadow Road in the 1930s.

The Meadowlands Museum is dedicated to preserving the history of the Meadowlands region, housing artifacts and exhibits related to the local cultural and natural heritage of Bergen County. (meadowlandsmuseum.com)

== The museum today ==
The museum's primary mission is to interpret the region's history through educational programs and displays of items relating to that history.

As of 2005, the museum has four permanent exhibits: an antique toy room featuring items from the 19th and early 20th century; an exhibit of local rocks and minerals, including fluorescent minerals; a pre-electric kitchen, designed to resemble a kitchen of the early 20th century; and the "homespun" room, featuring early- to mid-19th-century items such as spinning wheels, dishes, and clothes.

The museum has highlighted the life of Bergen County native poet William Carlos Williams.

In keeping with the museum's original concept, field trips to the museum are common among area schoolchildren.
