= Iviswold =

Historic house in New Jersey, United States

- Iviswold Castle
- U.S. National Register of Historic Places
- New Jersey Register of Historic Places
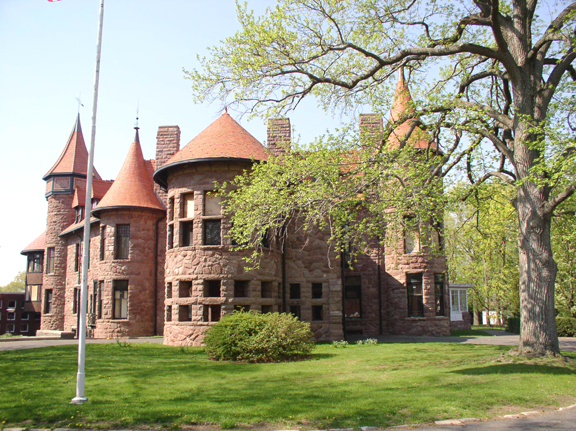
- Iviswold Castle in 2009

- Location within Bergen County, New Jersey
- Location: 223 Montross Avenue Rutherford, New Jersey
- Coordinates: 40°49′51″N 74°6′43″W
- Built: 1869
- Architect: William Henry Miller
- NRHP reference No.: 04001213
- NJRHP No.: 3743

Significant dates
- Added to NRHP: November 4, 2004
- Designated NJRHP: June 18, 2004

Iviswold, also known as "The Castle", is a house originally constructed in 1869 located in what is now Rutherford, in Bergen County, New Jersey, United States. It was placed on the List of Registered Historic Places in New Jersey on November 4, 2004. The house is part of the Rutherford campus of Felician College and underwent a renovation that was completed in 2013.

== History ==
The home was built in 1869 by Floyd W. Tomkins who called it "Hill House". It was purchased in 1887 by David Brinkerhoff Ivison who greatly expanded it and gave the home the name "Iviswold". The expansion was designed by Cornell architect William Henry Miller. Ivison died in 1903 and Iviswold was sold and resold multiple times. During this period the building was used by the Rutherford Union Club.

In 1930 the building was owned by the Rutherford National Bank, then headed by Fairleigh S. Dickinson. In 1942 Fairleigh Dickinson University was created and held the first classes within Iviswold. As the university grew it built multiple college buildings around Iviswold, but by the late 1980s the college was outgrowing their Rutherford campus, which was closed in 1994 and sold along with Iviswold to Felician University in 1997. Felician University spent several years restoring the building to its original condition for use as a student center. The New Jersey Historic Trust contributed $1,550,000 to the restoration project.

== Construction ==
The original home was a two-story stone house with a mansard roof. The 1887 remodeling of the house was inspired by the Château de Chaumont in Loir-et-Cher, France. The remodeling turned the building into a three-story turreted mansion with 25 rooms, including balconies, a music room and a porte-cochère. Local brownstone was used in the construction of the exterior walls.

In the 1930s, an indoor pool was installed with a water tower built into the structure to supply it. In the 1970s, when Fairleigh Dickinson was using the building for classroom space, the college covered up much of the original interior with drop ceilings and partition walls.

Felican College led renovations of the building, with exterior work taking place from 2000 to 2006 and interior work continuing until 2014. Among other things, the project involved re-installing cylindrical towers, stained glass windows, exterior masonry, the building's Ludowici clay tile roof, and ornate plaster reliefs.

== See also ==
- National Register of Historic Places listings in Bergen County, New Jersey
