= Bergen Township, New Jersey (1893–1902) =

Coordinates: 40.871°N 74.085°W

Bergen Township was a township that existed in Bergen County, New Jersey. The township was created on February 21, 1893, from the southern section of Lodi Township (now South Hackensack):

Be It Enacted by the Senate and General Assembly of Portion to be the State of New Jersey, That all that portion of the township of Lodi, in the county of Bergen, lying within the following boundaries, to wit, beginning at the intersection Boundaries, of the northerly boundary of the township of Boiling Springs, in the county of Bergen, with the middle of the Passaic river; running thence easterly along the northerly boundary of said township of Boiling Springs to the middle of the Hackensack River; thence, northerly along the middle of the Hackensack river to a point opposite the mouth of a creek emptying into said river, commonly known as the Upper Mudabock creek; thence, westerly in a straight line to a point where the northerly line of the public road leading from Moonachie to Wood-Ridge, commonly known as the Mousetown road, intersects the westerly line of the public road commonly known as the Moonachie road; thence, westerly along the northerly line of the Mousetown road to the westerly line of the Riser ditch; thence, northerly along the westerly line of said ditch to the northerly line of lands now or formerly belonging to the estate of Richard Vreeland; thence, westerly along said line of lands to the Polifly road; thence, still westerly in the same course as last described, along the northerly line of lands now or formerly belonging to the estate of Benjamin Cox to a line commonly known as the Polifly line; thence, northerly along said line to the southerly line of the public road leading from said Polifly road to the public road commonly known as the River road; thence westerly along the southerly line of said road leading from the Polifly road to the River road; thence, still westerly in line with the last course of the southerly line of said road to the middle of the Saddle river; thence, downstream through the middle of the Saddle river to the middle of the Passaic thence, down stream through the middle of said to the place of beginning, shall be and hereby is set off from the township Lodi, in the county of Bergen, and made a separate township, to be known by the name of the township of Bergen.

Another township with the same name, Bergen Township, was created 200 years earlier.

The borough of Carlstadt was formed on June 27, 1894, from portions of the township, at the height of the Boroughitis phenomenon then sweeping through Bergen County.

The borough of Wood-Ridge was created on December 6, 1894, from within the township, followed shortly thereafter by the borough of Wallington, which was formed on January 2, 1895, from portions of both Bergen Township and of Saddle River Township (now Saddle Brook).

On April 8, 1902, Bergen Township was dissolved and the remaining territory was reabsorbed by Lodi Township.

== Sources ==
- "History of Bergen County, New Jersey, 1630-1923;" by "Westervelt, Frances A. (Frances Augusta), 1858-1942."
- "Municipal Incorporations of the State of New Jersey (according to Counties)" prepared by the Division of Local Government, Department of the Treasury (New Jersey); December 1, 1958.
