= Kip Homestead =

Historic house in New Jersey, United States

- U.S. National Register of Historic Places
- New Jersey Register of Historic Places
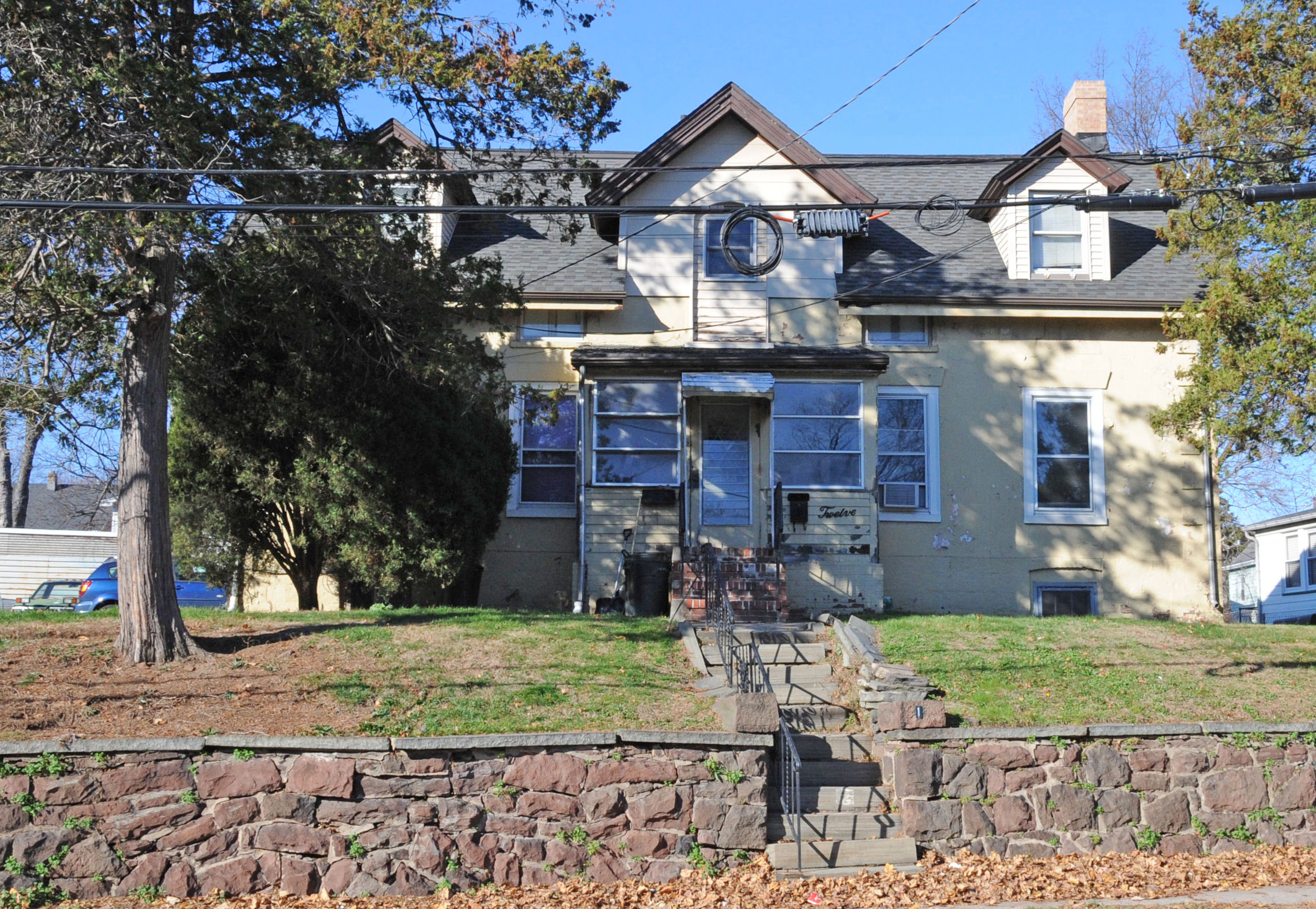

- Location within Bergen County, New Jersey Location within New Jersey Location within the United States
- Location: 12 Meadow Road, Rutherford, New Jersey
- Coordinates: 40°49′30″N 74°6′2″W
- Area: 0.9 acres (0.36 ha)
- Built: 1770
- Architects: Kip, Henrick; Kip, Peter
- Architectural style: Bergen County Dutch Stone
- MPS: Stone Houses of Bergen County TR
- NRHP reference No.: 83001529
- NJRHP No.: 666

Significant dates
- Added to NRHP: January 10, 1983
- Designated NJRHP: October 3, 1980

The Kip Homestead is located in Rutherford, Bergen County, in the U.S. state of New Jersey. The homestead was built in 1770 and was added to the National Register of Historic Places on January 10, 1983.

== See also ==
- National Register of Historic Places listings in Bergen County, New Jersey
