= Lodi Township, New Jersey =

Coordinates: 40°52′36.68″N 74°5′5.75″W

Historical population
Census	Pop.	Note	%±
1850	1,114		—
1860	2,063		85.2%
1870	3,221		56.1%
1880	4,071		26.4%
1890	5,181		27.3%
1900	448	*	−91.4%
1910	693		54.7%
1920	987		42.4%
1930	1,294		31.1%
* lost territory Historical census data source:

Lodi Township was a township in Bergen County, New Jersey, United States, from 1826 to 1935.

== History ==
Lodi Township was formed by the New Jersey Legislature Act on March 1, 1826, from the southern portion of New Barbadoes Township.

On February 22, 1840, Hudson County was created from territories that had been Bergen Township (1693) and from the southern portion of Lodi Township. The portion of Lodi Township taken at this time formed the new Harrison Township in Hudson County. The border between the newly created Harrison Township in Hudson County and the portion of Lodi Township remaining in Bergen County was the New Barbadoes Turnpike, which is now called Paterson Plank Road.

In 1852, some residents of the northern portion of Harrison Township requested to be returned to Bergen County. This area, which had been part of Lodi Township, was returned to Bergen County as Union Township.

On February 21, 1893, Bergen Township was created from the southern section of Lodi Township.

In 1894, with "Boroughitis" at its peak, the subdivision of Lodi Township kicked off with the creation of three boroughs: Hasbrouck Heights (July 31, 1894), Little Ferry (September 18, 1894) and Lodi (December 21, 1894). On April 8, 1902, what remained of Bergen Township, suffering from the same subdivisions plaguing Lodi Township, was returned to Lodi Township. Moonachie was created on April 11, 1910, followed by Teterboro on March 26, 1917. During this period, several exchanges of territory were made with neighboring municipalities.

=== Lodi Township sewer scandal ===
Finally, on November 15, 1935, Lodi Township was dissolved, and the remaining scattered fragments of the township became South Hackensack. The immediate cause of this was the "Lodi Township sewer scandal" of 1930, allegedly a corrupt municipal contract to build a sewer where there were, as yet, no streets. State Senator Ralph W. Chandless was expelled from the New Jersey State Senate due to his role in this scandal. The campaign to expose the scandal and those involved, including Chandless, was led by The Bergen Evening Record of Hackensack, later The Bergen Record and now The Record of Hackensack.

The sewer, built mainly along what is now Green Street, was arguably a sensible idea intended to attract commercial and industrial development. However, due to the Great Depression, development did not occur until after World War II.

The sewer line in question still exists in South Hackensack. Manhole covers along Green Street with the legend "Lodi Towns 1929" may still be seen.

== Notable residents ==
Notable residents of Lodi Township include:

- John Huyler (1808–1870), represented New Jersey's 4th congressional district in the United States House of Representatives from 1857 to 1859.

== Sources ==
- Municipal Incorporations of the State of New Jersey (according to Counties) prepared by the Division of Local Government, Department of the Treasury (New Jersey); December 1, 1958.
- Clayton, W. Woodford; and Nelson, William. History of Bergen and Passaic Counties, New Jersey, with Biographical Sketches of Many of its Pioneers and Prominent Men. Philadelphia: Everts and Peck, 1882.
- Harvey, Cornelius Burnham (ed.), Genealogical History of Hudson and Bergen Counties, New Jersey. New York: New Jersey Genealogical Publishing Co., 1900.
- Van Valen, James M. History of Bergen County, New Jersey. New York: New Jersey Publishing and Engraving Co., 1900.
- Westervelt, Frances A. (Frances Augusta), 1858–1942, History of Bergen County, New Jersey, 1630–1923, Lewis Historical Publishing Company, 1923.
