= Felician University =

Catholic university in New Jersey, US

Felician University The Franciscan University of New Jersey
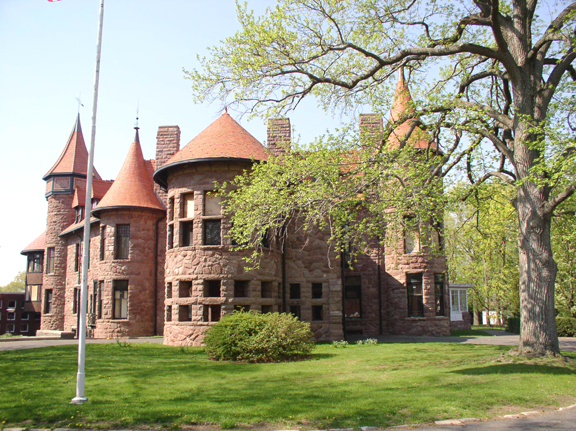
- Iviswold Castle, located on the Rutherford campus
- Former names: Immaculate Conception Normal School (1923–1942); Immaculate Conception Junior College (1942–1967); Felician College (1967–2015)
- Motto: In Veritate Felicitas
- Motto in English: In Truth is Happiness
- Type: Private university
- Established: 1942; 84 years ago
- Religious affiliation: Catholic (Felician Sisters)
- Academic affiliations: AFCU; ACCU; NAICU; CIC
- President: Mildred Mihlon (acting)
- Students: 2,427 (fall 2024)
- Undergraduates: 1,870 (fall 2024)
- Postgraduates: 557 (fall 2024)
- Location: Lodi and Rutherford, New Jersey, U.S.
- Campus: 27 acres (11 ha)
- Nickname: Golden Falcons
- Sporting affiliations: NCAA Division II – CACC
- Website: felician.edu
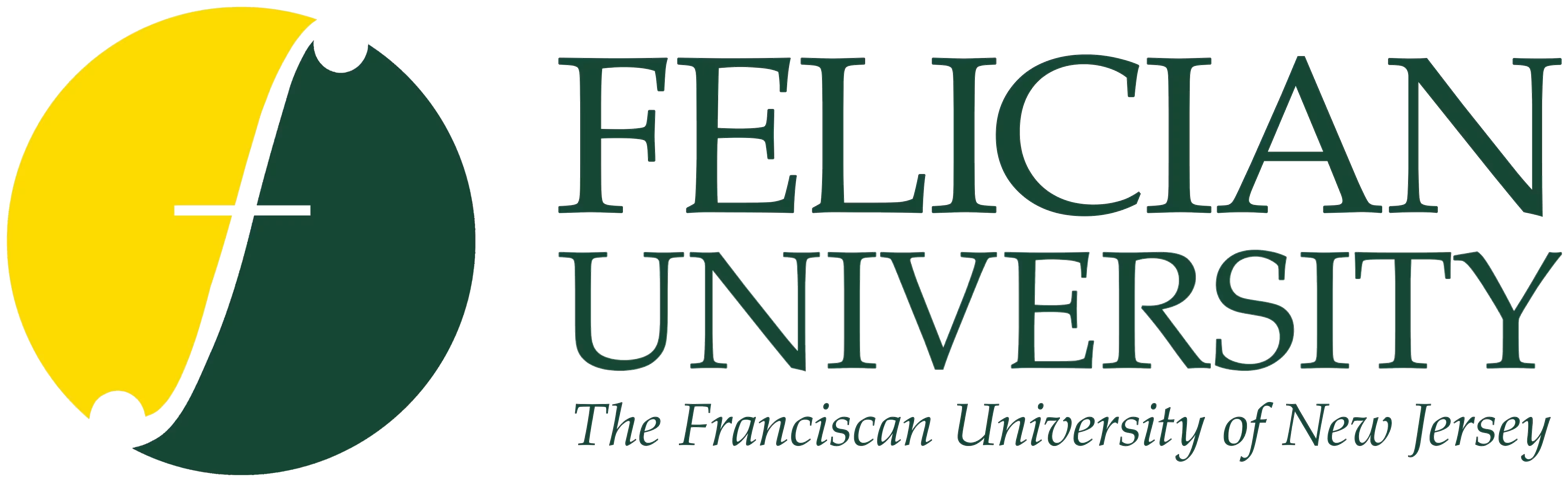

Felician University is a private Catholic university with two campuses in the U.S. state of New Jersey, one in Lodi and one in Rutherford. In 2016–17 enrollment was 1,996, with undergraduates comprising around 1,626 students; 21 percent were men and 79 percent were women.

== History ==
The school was founded as the Immaculate Conception Normal School by the Felician Sisters in 1923. It has changed names several times in its history, most recently in 2015, to Felician University.

In June 2015, the American Association of University Professors (AAUP) censured Felician College for terminating the services of several faculty members without adequate explanation, adequate notice, or an opportunity for review.

== Campuses ==
Located 12 miles (19 km) from New York City, Felician University has two locations in Bergen County, New Jersey, in the towns of Lodi and Rutherford. These campuses are about 3 miles (4.8 km) apart, with regular shuttle service running between them throughout the day and evening. The Rutherford campus has a gymnasium and a late-night coffee shop and game room.

The Lodi campus library occupies an International Style building, and houses print collections, sound recordings, and visual media in digital format. Three levels contain an information commons, reading room, book stacks, spaces for group as well as quiet study, and two computer laboratories. It has more than 115,000 books, 360 print periodicals, 20,000 online journals, 43,000 electronic books, and 80,000 microforms that offer strong historical and current perspectives in support of the curriculum.

The library also provides a broad selection of online resources, of which are accessible on the campus computer network, as well as off-campus with a college network ID and password. The Curriculum Materials Library and Technology Center, located in Sammartino Hall on the Rutherford campus, collects children's literature, textbooks, curriculum guides, periodicals, and other instructional materials suitable for use in the classroom. An active information literacy instruction program through library liaisons begins with the Freshman Year Experience program.

== Accreditation ==
The university is accredited by the Middle States Commission on Higher Education. Specialized accreditation also exists for the nursing and teaching programs:

- Commission on Collegiate Nursing Education:
  - Nursing (CNURED) – nursing education programs at the baccalaureate degree levels 4/28/1998
  - Nursing (CNURED) – nursing education programs at the graduate degree levels 4/28/1998
- Teacher Education Accreditation Council, Accreditation Committee
  - Baccalaureate Teacher Education Accreditation Council (BTEAC) – baccalaureate programs 6/29/2007 – pre-accredited
  - Graduate Teacher Education Accreditation Council (GTEAC) – graduate programs 6/29/2007 – pre-accredited

== Undergraduate admissions ==
In 2024, Felician University accepted 94% of undergraduate applicants and those enrolled had an average 3.05 high school GPA. The university does not require submission of standardized test scores, but they will be considered when submitted. Those enrolled who submitted test scores had an average 1020 SAT score (11% submitting scores).

== Athletics ==
Golden Falcons varsity teams
Sport	Men's	Women's
Baseball	✓	
Basketball	✓	✓
Bowling		✓
Cheerleading		✓
Cross country	✓	✓
Golf	✓	
Lacrosse	✓	✓
Soccer	✓	✓
Softball		✓
Swimming & diving		✓
Track and field (indoor)		✓
Track and field (outdoor)		✓
Volleyball		✓

Felician University teams participate as a member of the National Collegiate Athletic Association's Division II. The Golden Falcons are a member of the Central Atlantic Collegiate Conference (CACC). Men's sports include baseball, basketball, cross country, golf and soccer, and lacrosse. Women's sports include bowling, basketball, cross country, lacrosse, soccer, softball, volleyball, and track & field.

The women's cross country team earned the institution's first women's conference championship by winning the 2022 CACC title.

== Notable alumni ==
- Jerry Vasto (born 1992), MLB pitcher for the Colorado Rockies
