= William Sandford (colonist) =

English colonist (1637–1691)

William Sandford (1637–1691) was a colonist, planter, government official and militiaman. Born in an English enclave in The Free and Hanseatic City of Hamburg, he also lived in Surinam, Barbados and East Jersey. In partnership with his uncle, Nathaniel Kingsland of Barbados, he obtained the initial land grant for New Barbadoes, New Jersey and he and his family were the first European settlers there. He held various civil offices and was involved in several militia engagements.

== Early life ==
Sandford was baptized on December 24, 1637 at the Church of the English Court in Hamburg. His parents were merchant adventurer Thomas Sandford and Elizabeth Kingsland. Probably about 1644, he moved with his mother and siblings to Barbados, where his mother's brother, Nathaniel Kingsland, was a wealthy plantation owner.

== Career ==
Before 1660 William moved to Surinam, where his brother Robert was a plantation owner and government official. The brothers lost a power struggle with Governor William Byam and were tried on charges tantamount to sedition. Robert was disenfranchised and banished, while William was let off with minor sanctions. In 1664 William leased and managed a plantation owned by his uncle. He left Surinam after the Second Anglo-Dutch War resulted in the loss of the plantation.

In 1668, William acquired the first land grant awarded in New Barbadoes, a tract of 15,308 acres (23.92 square miles). He and his family settled there in 1670. In 1671, the grant was divided between Kingsland and Sandford, with Sandford becoming the sole owner of the southern third of the tract. That land would remain in his family's hands for more than six decades and eventually be known as West Hudson.

Sandford served East Jersey as a member of the Governor's Council. He also served as court president and justice of the supreme court, as well as attorney general. He was commissioned as a captain in the East Jersey militia. In 1680 he commanded the garrison at Elizabethtown in a tense engagement with leaders of New York as they moved to take control over New Jersey. He was promoted to the rank of major in 1683.

== Personal life ==
As he departed Surinam in 1667, Sandford married Sarah Whartman in a shipboard ceremony that was kept secret for at least ten years. While Sandford was recorded in 1668 as a resident of Barbados, the whereabouts of his family from 1667 to 1670 are unclear. The couple would raise five children, as well as a daughter of William's by another union. His descendants include two governors of New Jersey, William Sandford Pennington and William Pennington.
