= Berry's Creek =

River known for its pollution in northeastern New Jersey, United States

Berry's Creek Berrys Creek Berry Creek
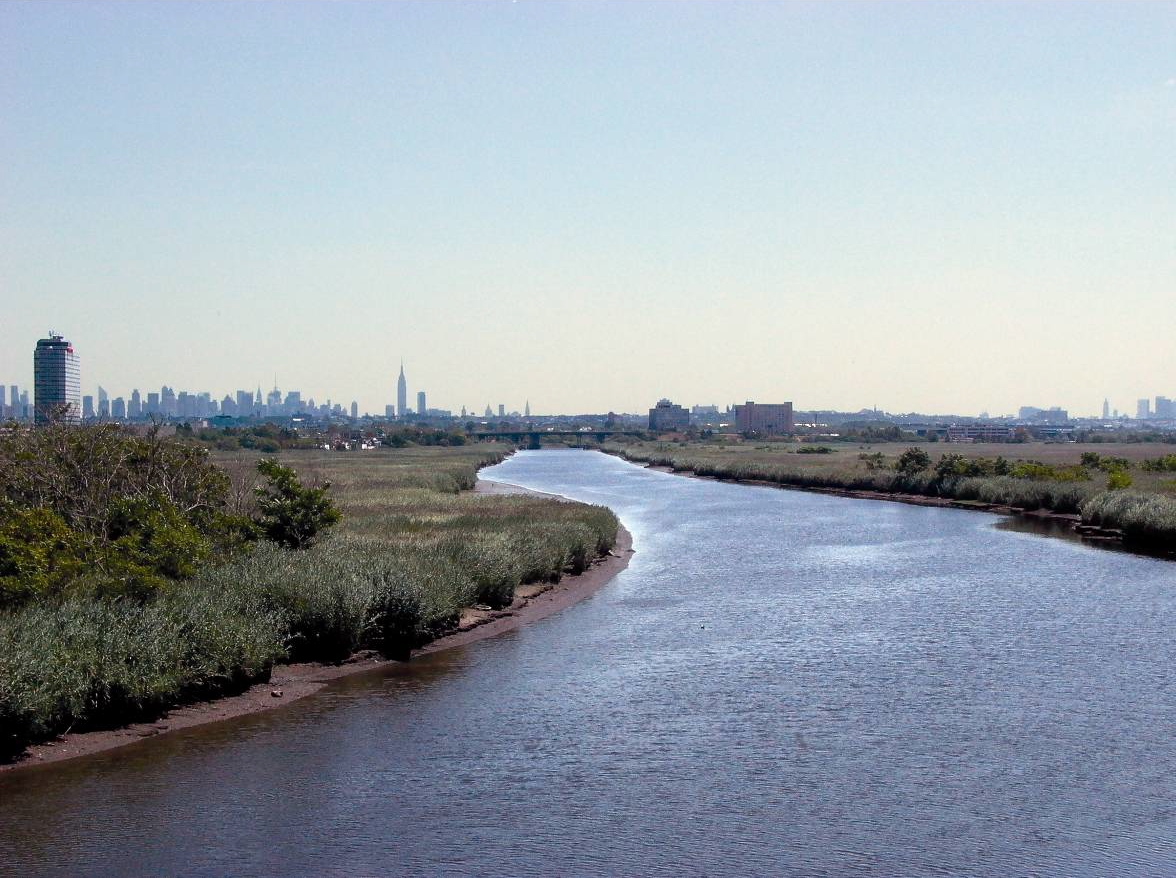
- Berry's Creek Canal with New York City in the distance

- Location within Bergen County, New Jersey Location within New Jersey
- Etymology: Major John Berry

Location
- Country: United States
- State: New Jersey
- City: Teterboro, Lyndhurst, Moonachie, Wood-Ridge, East Rutherford, Rutherford

Physical characteristics
- Source: Losen Slofe
  - location: Teterboro, New Jersey
  - coordinates: 40.869877°N 74.057814°W
- Mouth: Hackensack River
  - location: Lyndhurst, New Jersey
  - coordinates: 40.786923°N 74.084714°W
- Length: 4.5 miles (7.2 km)

Basin features
- River system: New Jersey Meadowlands
- Landmarks: Teterboro Airport, Meadowlands Sports Complex
- Tributaries
  - left: Berry's Creek Canal; Peach Island Creek

Berry's Creek (sometimes referred to as Berrys Creek or Berry Creek) is a tributary of the Hackensack River in the New Jersey Meadowlands in Bergen County, New Jersey. The creek watershed contains a diverse array of wetlands, marshes, and wildlife. The creek runs through a densely populated region and has been subject to extensive industrial pollution during the 19th and 20th centuries. Several companies discharged toxic chemicals into the creek in the 20th century, and these chemicals have remained in the sediment. The creek has the highest concentrations of methyl mercury of any freshwater sediment in the world. Portions of the creek watershed are Superfund sites, and cleanup projects began in the late 20th century.

== History ==
The creek is named for Major John Berry, an early British settler and Deputy Governor of New Jersey. Settlement of New Jersey by European colonists began in the 17th century. Increasing settlements in the early 19th century were accompanied by human alterations to the land in the Hackensack meadowlands, such as clearing forests; building roads, railroads and ditches; and filling wetlands. The Second Industrial Revolution led to construction of heavy manufacturing, storage tanks, and chemical processing plants in the area during the late 19th & early 20th centuries. Upland areas in the Berry's Creek watershed were developed by 1900. In the 1930s municipal sewage discharges began to contribute significant amount of pollutants to the creek and the Hackensack River. (All sewage pipes to the creek were removed by the 1990s.)

Urbanization in the region intensified after World War II, with the expansion of roads and highways, including the New Jersey Turnpike (1952), as well as the Meadowlands Sports Complex (1970s). Tide gates were installed in the 1960s to control flooding, and these installations altered the water levels and flows, which consequently altered the ecosystem. The filling of wetlands during the 20th century amounted to a 63% loss of wetlands in the watershed.

== Course ==
Berry's Creek is largely a tidal estuary, along with the Hackensack River. It rises at the East and West Riser Ditches in Teterboro, some of which is within the bounds of Teterboro Airport. The main channel of the creek runs for 4.5 miles (7.2 km), winding through Moonachie and Carlstadt. In East Rutherford, the creek forms the western boundary at Walden Marsh, of the Meadowlands Sports Complex. Additional portions of the creek are located in Wood-Ridge.

Continuing under Route 3, the creek divides into the creek mainstem and Berry's Creek Canal. The canal was built in 1911, and runs in a straight line through East Rutherford to the Hackensack River. The creek mainstem enters Rutherford and then forms the boundary between Rutherford and Lyndhurst until it reaches the Hackensack.

== Watershed ==
The Berry's Creek watershed is 12 square miles (31 km^{2}), which includes 1.6 square miles (4.1 km^{2}) of tidal waterways and marshes and 10.4 square miles (27 km^{2}) of highly-developed upland areas. Within the watershed are many commercial and light industrial sites, portions of the sports complex, several closed landfills, and many roads and highways.

Walden Marsh was built in the 1980s adjacent to the sports complex, as part of environmental mitigation for flood prevention measures that were installed.

== Pollution and remediation ==
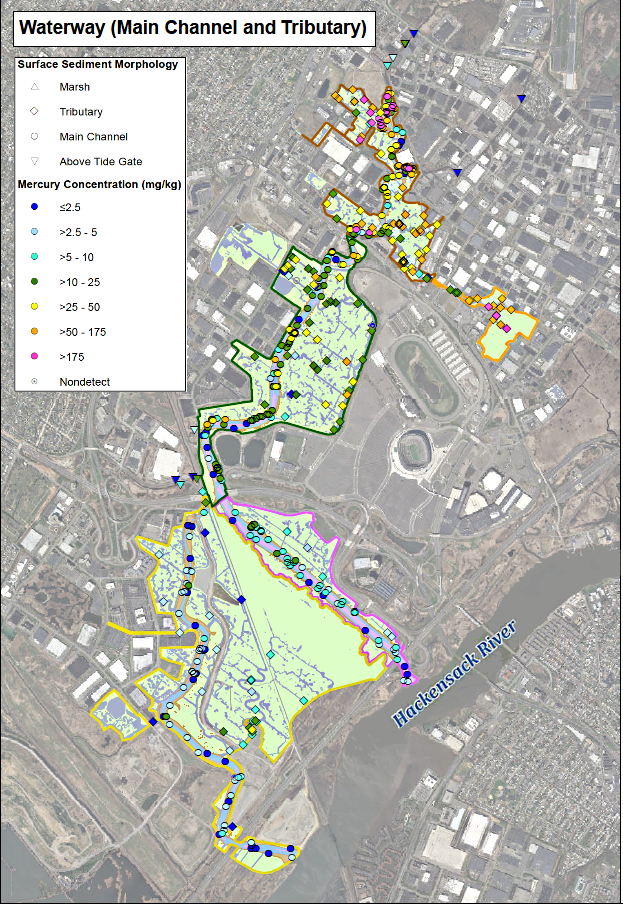
Map of mercury concentrations in surface sediment of Berry's Creek

Berry’s Creek was subject to extensive industrial pollution during the 19th and 20th centuries.

=== Ventron/Velsicol site ===
F.W. Berk and Company, a chemical processing firm in Wood-Ridge and Carlstadt, discharged untreated waste, including mercury, into the creek between 1929 and 1960. In 1960 Berk sold its 40 acres (16 ha) property to Wood Ridge Chemical Corporation, a subsidiary of Velsicol Chemical Corporation, and the waste discharges continued. In the 1960s the New Jersey Department of Health conducted tests of the plant effluent, although the principal focus at that time was conventional pollutants, for which there were well-established analytical testing methods. (Some wastewater samples were analyzed for mercury, however the results were negative due to the insensitivity of the test method employed.) In 1968 the plant was sold to Ventron, which continued operations, although the company also began to study the environmental impacts of its discharges. In 1970 the newly-established U.S. Environmental Protection Agency (EPA) also began tests of the plant wastewater, and found there were daily discharges of two to four pounds of mercury into Berry's Creek. Neither the state nor EPA filed formal charges against the plant at that time. Plant operations ended in 1974, when Ventron sold the property to Robert M. Wolf, a real estate developer.

In 1976, the New Jersey Department of Environmental Protection (NJDEP; successor to the Dept. of Health) filed a lawsuit against Ventron and other parties for violating the recently enacted New Jersey Water Quality Improvement Act of 1971. The state enacted a new chemical spill law in 1977, the Spill Compensation and Control Act, and additional charges under this law were added to the lawsuit. In 1983 the New Jersey Supreme Court held that Ventron and Velsicol were jointly liable for the environmental damage.

The creek has been measured as having the highest concentration of methyl mercury of any fresh-water sediment in the world. Between 1 and 2 g of mercury per kg of sediment were detected in samples. A total of discharge of 268 tons of mercury-contaminated toxic waste were discharged into the creek between 1943 and 1974. Wolf had demolished the former Ventron plant in 1974, but the residual pollution remained in the creek, rendering the site still unsustainable.

=== EPA Superfund designations ===
Ventron/Velsicol
- Superfund site
- Location within Bergen County, New Jersey
- Location: Borough of Wood-Ridge, Bergen, New Jersey

Information
- CERCLIS ID: NJD980529879
- Responsible parties: Velsicol Chemical Corporation; Ventron Corporation

Progress
- Proposed: September 8, 1983
- Listed: September 21, 1984

The federal "Superfund" law was enacted by Congress in 1980 to provide for cleanup of hazardous waste sites, and was based on New Jersey’s 1977 spill cleanup law. EPA applied the new cleanup law in 1983 and 1984 as it designated the Ventron/Velsicol site and two nearby sites—the Scientific Chemical site in Carlstadt, and the Universal Oil Products site in East Rutherford—as Superfund sites. EPA and NJDEP began detailed assessment and initial cleanup activities on these sites in the 1980s. Contaminated soil was removed and replaced at several properties in 1990, as an interim measure. Additional cleanup actions are projected to continue during the first quarter 21st century. In addition to mercury, all three sites are laden with PCBs.

In October 2018 EPA announced a 5.5-year plan to remove and/or cap the toxic waste in the creek and watershed resulting from the Ventron/Velsicol site discharges. EPA began the final remedial action for the Scientific Chemical site in 2020, and estimates that construction will be completed in 2026. Portions of the Universal Oil Products site have been cleaned up and removed from the Superfund list, but other portions remain contaminated as of 2024.

== Wildlife ==
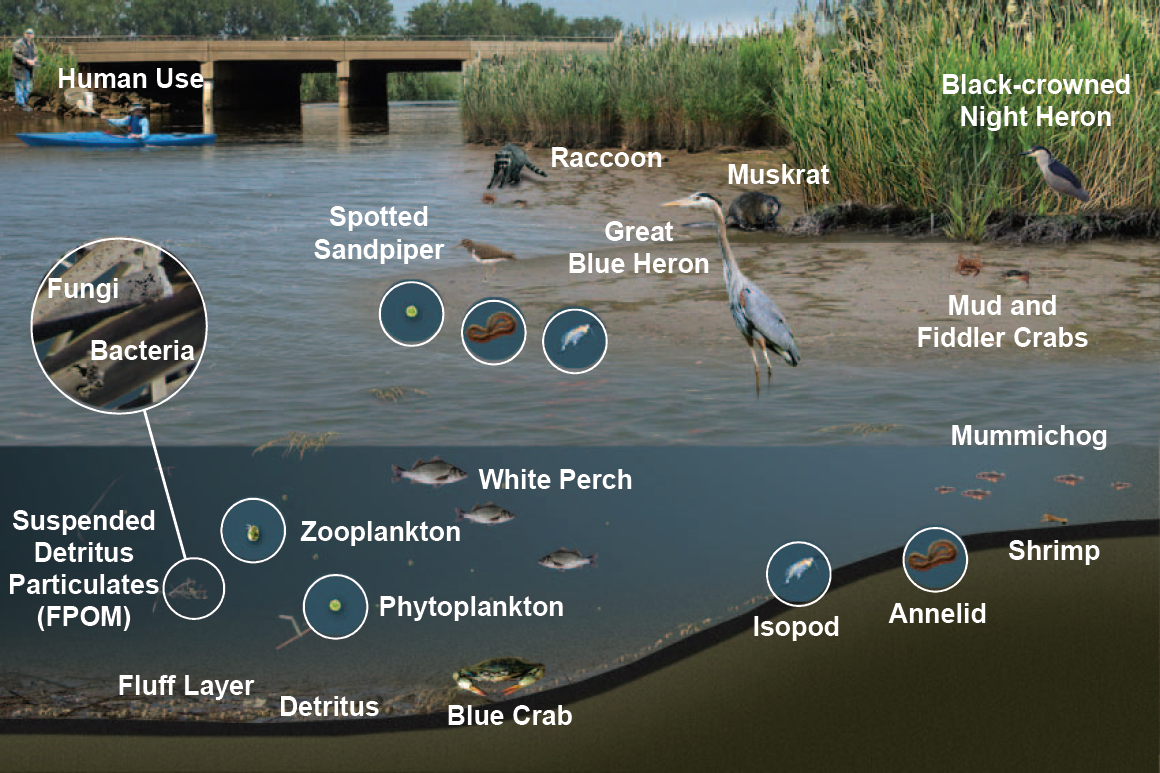
Food web in Berry's Creek

Through the early 1900s, the predominant plants in the watershed were freshwater species such as cattails and Atlantic white cedar. The plant composition began to change after construction of the Oradell Dam on the Hackensack River in 1921. The dam was built at the head of tide, which increased the salinity of Berry's Creek, and since then the marsh vegetation in has been composed predominately of Phragmites (Phragmites australis).

Berry's Creek harbors the last remaining northern harrier nest site in the Meadowlands. It is heavily used by wintering raptors. "The marshes of the Meadowlands provide many important wetland functions. More than 265 species of birds use the area, and the Meadowlands is recognized as a major link along the Atlantic Flyway for migratory species (especially shorebirds) and an important overwintering area for a variety of waterfowl... Waterway-associated birds occurring in the region include a variety of shorebirds, wading birds, waterfowl, and gulls."

Significant fish species in the Meadowlands region are mummichog (Fundulus heteroclitus), white perch (Morone americana), Atlantic silverside (Menidia menidia), gizzard shad (Dorosoma cepedianum), striped killifish (Fundulus majalis), and striped bass (Morone saxatilis). In November 1991 a water sample survey found high levels of the metallic element chromium in the hepatopancreas of the local blue crab (Callinectes sapidus) population. NJDEP has issued advisories warning against harvesting or eating blue crabs from Berry's Creek, the entire Hackensack River watershed and Newark Bay.

== See also ==
- List of rivers of New Jersey
- List of Superfund sites in New Jersey
