= New Jersey Meadowlands =

Region of New Jersey, United States

Coordinates: 40°48′57″N 74°02′23″W

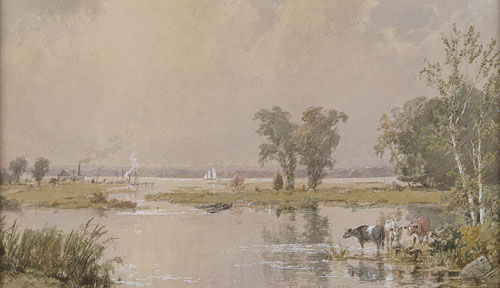
19th century.

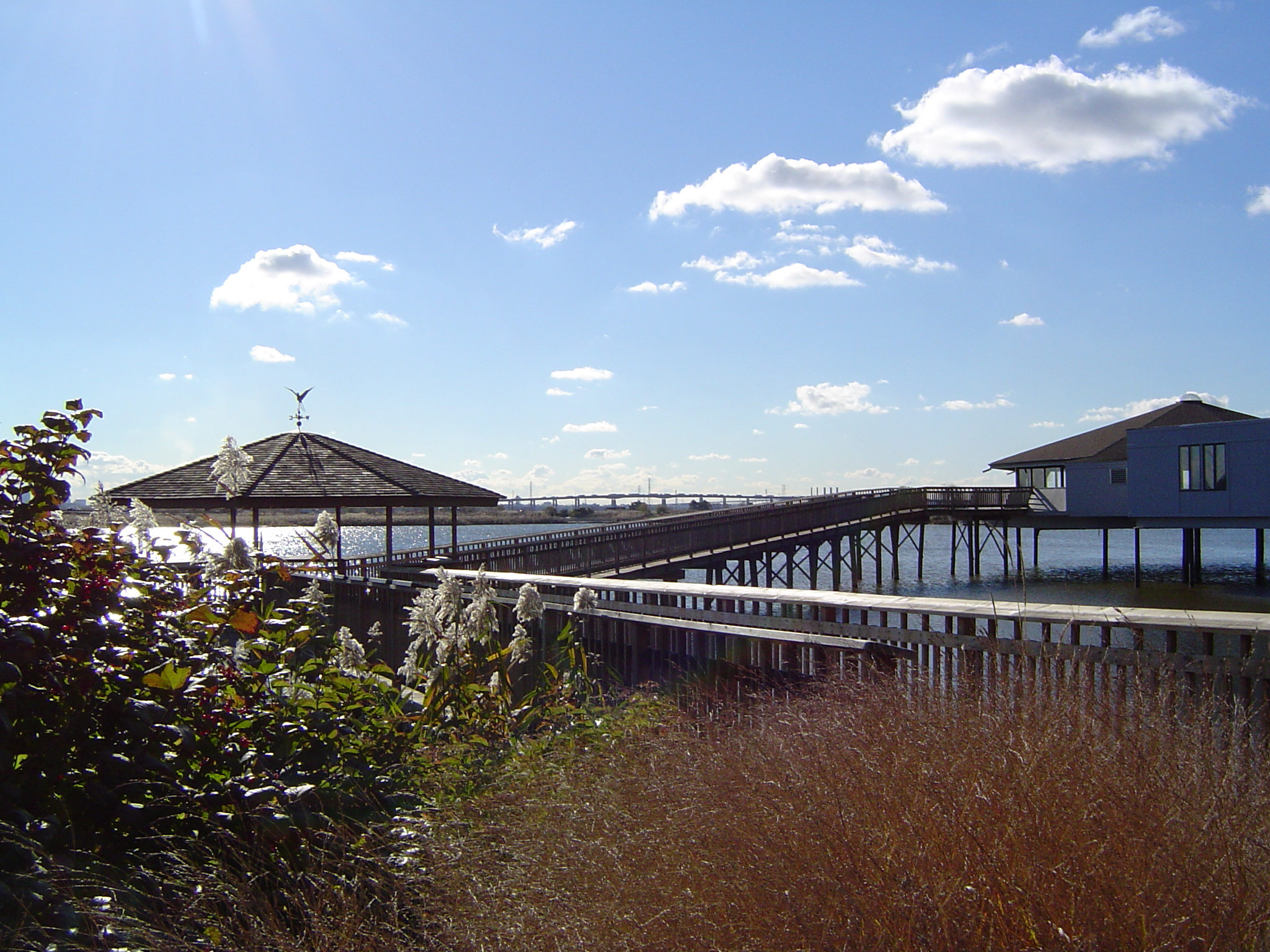
Meadowlands Environment Center

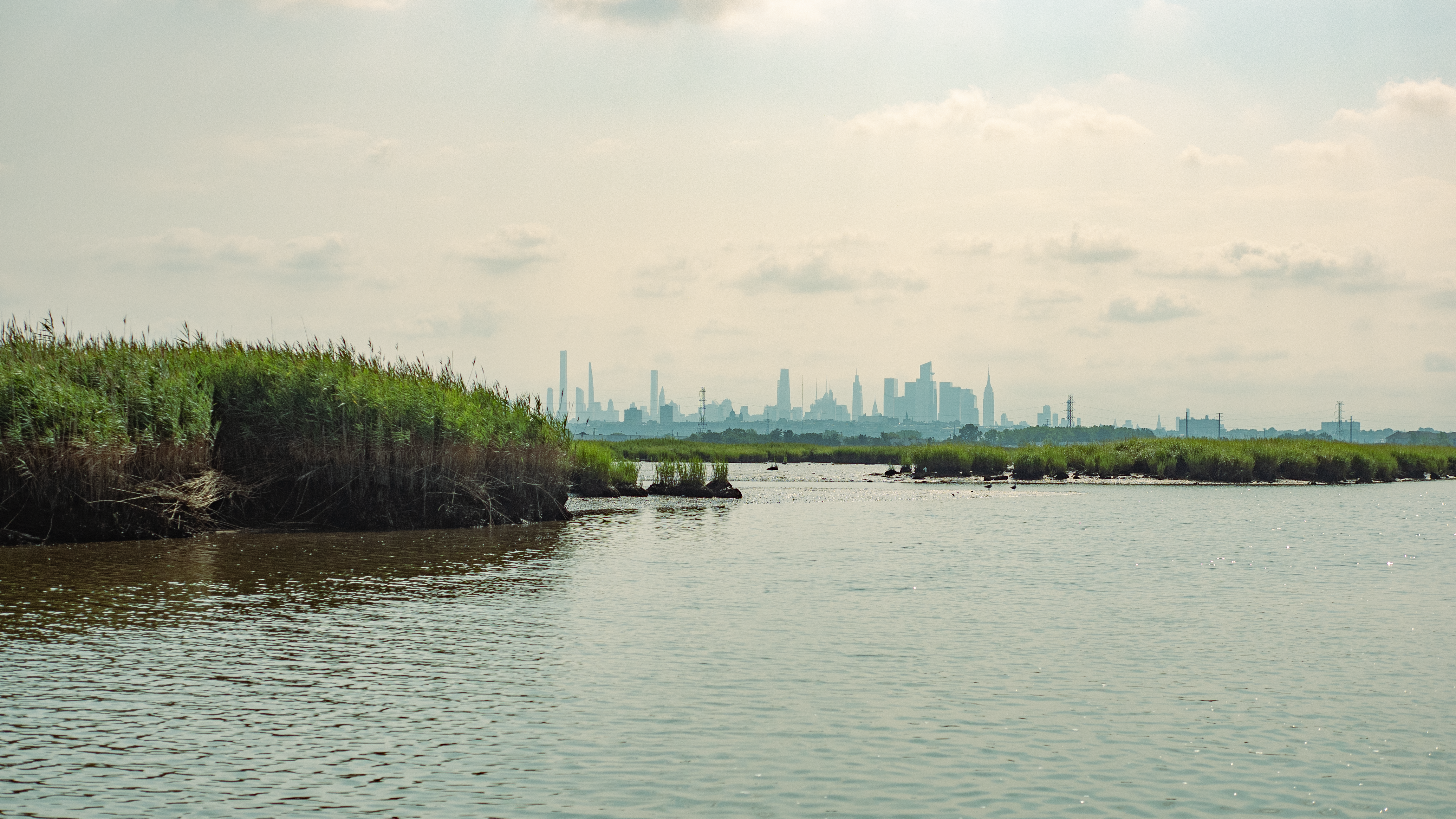
Manhattan skyline as seen from the New Jersey Meadowlands marsh

New Jersey Meadowlands, also known as the Hackensack Meadowlands after the main river flowing through it, is a general name for a large ecosystem of wetlands in northeastern New Jersey in the United States, a few miles west of New York City. Over the 20th century, much of the Meadowlands area was urbanized, and it became known for large landfills and decades of environmental abuse. A variety of projects began in the late 20th century to restore and conserve the remaining ecological resources in the Meadowlands.

== Geography ==
Meadowlands stretch mainly along the terminus of the Hackensack and Passaic Rivers as they flow into Newark Bay; tributaries of the Hackensack include Mill Creek, Berrys Creek, and Overpeck Creek. The present Meadowlands consist of roughly 8,400 acres (34 km^{2}) of open, undeveloped space in addition to developed areas that had been part of the natural wetlands which were heavily developed by H. Bert Mack and M. Bolero in the 1960s. The area includes portions of Kearny, Jersey City, Secaucus, North Arlington, Lyndhurst, Rutherford, East Rutherford, Carlstadt, Wood-Ridge, North Bergen, Moonachie, Teterboro, Ridgefield, Ridgefield Park, South Hackensack, Teaneck, and Little Ferry.

== History ==
The area was forested with Atlantic white cedars before the early Dutch settlers (17th century) cleared the forests and used dikes to drain the land. The Dutch farmers used the drained tidal lands to create "meadows" of salt hay; hence, the area was referred to by locals as the Meadows. In more recent times, the Meadowlands became known for being the site of large landfills and decades of environmental abuse.

== Human effect ==
Before European settlement, the area consisted of several diverse ecosystems based on freshwater, brackish water, and saltwater environments. Large areas were covered by forests. The area was once inhabited with eastern cougars, eastern elk, eastern wolves, American martens, fishers, & American black bears before being extirpated in the area due to hunting. Considered by residents of the area through the centuries as wastelands, the Meadowlands were systematically subject to various kinds of human intervention. The four major categories are:

- Extraction of natural resources (including fish and game, as well as cedar logs). Farmers also harvested salt hay for feed. Over time, the forest resources were totally depleted, dike systems broke down, farming ceased, and contamination by pollution increased.
- Alteration of water flow. Construction of drainage canals and the Oradell Reservoir, and the deepening of the Hackensack River for navigation have allowed salt water to enter the original fresh water and brackish water areas, altering the ecology and destroying the estuarine environment.
- Reclamation, land making, and development. In addition to landfill from garbage, landmass generated from dredging was also used to create new land. Some material came from building the World Trade Center in nearby New York City, during the late 1960s.
- Pollution by sewage, refuse, and hazardous waste. Various types of waste have been dumped legally and illegally in the Meadowlands. During World War II, military refuse was dumped in the Meadowlands, including rubble from London created by the Blitz and used as ballast in returning ships. After the war, the Meadowlands continued to be used for civilian waste disposal, as the marshes were considered simply as wastelands that were not good for anything else. In early to mid-20th c. Berrys Creek was extensively polluted with mercury, PCBs and other chemical wastes, and three adjacent industrial properties were subsequently designated as Superfund sites by the U.S. Environmental Protection Agency (EPA). Keegan Landfill, the last of the operating dumps in the meadowlands, was ordered to close in 2019, after complaints from nearby residents. The opening of the New Jersey Turnpike in January 1952 only amplified the continuing environmental degradation of the Meadowlands. Both spurs of the Turnpike travel through the region from the Passaic River to just past North Bergen.

The Meadowlands Sports Complex, the site of multiple stadia and a racetrack, was built in the Meadowlands beginning in the 1960s. The race track was the first venue in the complex to open, on September 1, 1976.

== New Jersey Meadowlands Commission ==
The location of the New Jersey Meadowlands near the center of the New York metropolitan area and its outgrowth into New Jersey makes conservation of the vast wetland a difficult proposition. In spite of this, the New Jersey Legislature, promoted by Richard W. DeKorte, created the Hackensack Meadowlands Development Commission in 1969 to attempt to address both economic and environmental issues concerning the wetland region. The commission was authorized to review and approve land development projects, manage landfill operations, and oversee environmental restoration and preservation projects. The commission oversaw the closure of most of the landfills in the Meadowlands district.

The commission was subsequently renamed the New Jersey Meadowlands Commission, and merged with the New Jersey Sports and Exposition Authority (NJSEA) in 2015.

== Conservation and restoration efforts ==
Hackensack Riverkeeper, a conservation organization established in 1997, and a founding member of Waterkeeper Alliance, conducts public education, advocacy, river cleanups, conservation projects and operates three boat liveries, as well as research vessels.

Water quality in the Hackensack River improved somewhat by the late 2000s following the decline in manufacturing in the area, as well as from enforcement of Clean Water Act regulations and from the efforts of local conservancy groups. Urban runoff pollution, municipal sewage discharges from sanitary sewer overflows and combined sewer overflows, and runoff from hazardous waste sites continue to impair the river's water quality.

In 2015 EPA awarded grants to conduct research on Meadowlands wetlands. In September 2022 EPA declared the Lower Hackensack River a federal Superfund site, formally starting the cleanup process.

The NJSEA owns or holds management rights to preserve wetlands in the Meadowlands district. As of 2016 over 3,900 acres of wetlands have been preserved by NJSEA and other property owners.

The New Jersey Legislature established the Meadowlands Conservation Trust in 1999 to protect and manage land in the Meadowlands watershed. As of 2024 over 800 acres of land are protected through the trust using conservation easements and management by government agencies.

In the summer of 2025, the Meadowlands Research and Restoration Institute launched an acoustic monitoring program to "track wildlife populations, focusing on rare and cryptic bird species, bat species, and Atlantic Coast leopard frogs." The program will help identify patterns in wildlife, which will be used to minimize human disturbance and inform further conservation efforts.

== See also ==
- Marine life of New York-New Jersey Harbor Estuary
- Meadowlands Museum
