= Carmine Savino =

American lawyer, newspaper editor and politician (1911–1993)

Member of the New Jersey General Assembly from Bergen County
- In office 1954–1964

Personal details
- Born: November 11, 1911; Lyndhurst, New Jersey, U.S.
- Died: November 19, 1993 (aged 82); Lyndhurst, New Jersey, U.S.
- Political party: Republican
- Spouse: Eileen
- Education: Rutgers University; John Marshall Law School

Carmine F. Savino Jr. (November 11, 1911 – November 19, 1993) was an American lawyer, newspaper editor and Republican Party politician who represented Bergen County, for ten years in the New Jersey General Assembly before being appointed to serve on the state court of tax appeals. He spent six decades as an editor at a group of local newspapers.

Born and raised in Lyndhurst, New Jersey, Savino lived there his entire life. His father served as the township's mayor. He graduated from Lyndhurst High School, Rutgers University and John Marshall Law School. After passing the state bar exam, he established a law practice in his hometown.

Savino was elected as a Republican and served in the New Jersey General Assembly from 1954 until 1964.

In 1954, Savino and Charles W. Kraus won a special election to fill the two seats in the Assembly that had been vacated by Lawrence Cavanto (who had been appointed as a judge) and Wilma Marggraff (who went on to become the first woman elected as a Bergen County Freeholder). He won his first full term in the 1955 general election, as the Republicans swept Bergen County's six seats in the Assembly, with Savino winning alongside his running mates Charles W. Kraus, Edmund E. Field Jr., Pierce H. Deamer Jr., Arthur Vervaet and Earl A. Maryatt. He left office in the legislature after being appointed to serve on the Board of Tax Appeals.

After Governor of New Jersey Robert B. Meyner vetoed in July 1955 a bill that would have given salary increases to state court judges because of the resulting increases in pension costs to the state, Savino argued that the legislature should override the veto, saying that "It is shameful that New Jersey's judges continue to be the victims of political maneuvering."

In 1958, Savino proposed introducing legislation under which local school districts would be eliminated, with schools placed under county control and partially funded with a statewide sales tax rate of three percent that would provide more equal funding to schools regardless of the property tax base in each community; the estimated $250 million that would be raised by the proposed sales tax would be enough to cut local property taxes in half.

Savino died in 1993.
