= Lyndhurst High School =

High school in Bergen County, New Jersey, US

Location
- 400 Weart Avenue; Lyndhurst, Bergen County, New Jersey 07071; United States; 40.810425°N 74.126424°W

Information
- Type: Public high school
- Established: 1926
- School district: Lyndhurst School District
- NCES School ID: 340921000568
- Principal: Laura Vuono
- Faculty: 61.4 FTEs
- Grades: 9-12
- Enrollment: 841 (as of 2024–25)
- Student to teacher ratio: 13.7:1
- Colors: Blue and Gold
- Athletics conference: North Jersey Interscholastic Conference
- Team name: Golden Bears
- Newspaper: The Lighthouse
- Website: lhs.lyndhurstschools.net

Lyndhurst High School is a four-year comprehensive public high school that serves students in ninth through twelfth grade from Lyndhurst, in Bergen County, in the U.S. state of New Jersey, operating as the lone secondary school of the Lyndhurst School District.

As of the 2024–25 school year, the school had an enrollment of 841 students and 61.4 classroom teachers (on an FTE basis), for a student–teacher ratio of 13.7:1. There were 212 students (25.2% of enrollment) eligible for free lunch and 67 (8.0% of students) eligible for reduced-cost lunch.

== History ==
Lyndhurst High School opened for the 1926–27 school year. The school building was formally dedicated at ceremonies held in March 1927.

== Awards, recognition and rankings ==
The school was the 165th-ranked public high school in New Jersey out of 339 schools statewide in New Jersey Monthly magazine's September 2014 cover story on the state's "Top Public High Schools", using a new ranking methodology. The school had been ranked 162nd in the state of 328 schools in 2012, after being ranked 178th in 2010 out of 322 schools listed. The magazine ranked the school 182nd in 2008 out of 316 schools. The school was ranked 179th in the magazine's September 2006 issue, which surveyed 316 schools across the state. Schooldigger.com ranked the school 188th out of 381 public high schools statewide in its 2011 rankings (an increase of 38 positions from the 2010 ranking) which were based on the combined percentage of students classified as proficient or above proficient on the two components of the High School Proficiency Assessment (HSPA), mathematics (80.3%) and language arts literacy (91.7%).

== Athletics ==
The Lyndhurst High School Golden Bears participate in the Meadowlands Division of the North Jersey Interscholastic Conference, which is comprised of small-enrollment schools in Bergen, Hudson, Morris and Passaic counties, and was created following a reorganization of sports leagues in Northern New Jersey by the New Jersey State Interscholastic Athletic Association (NJSIAA). With 547 students in grades 10–12, the school was classified by the NJSIAA for the 2019–20 school year as Group II for most athletic competition purposes, which included schools with an enrollment of 486 to 758 students in that grade range. Prior to the NJSIAA's realignment that took place in the fall of 2010, Lyndhurst was part of the Bergen County Scholastic League (BCSL). The school was classified by the NJSIAA as Group II North for football for 2024–2026, which included schools with 484 to 683 students.

The school participates as the host school / lead agency for a joint cooperative boys / girls swimming and wrestling teams with North Arlington High School. Lyndhurst and Hackensack High School participate in a joint ice hockey team, in which Paramus High School is the host school. These co-op programs operate under agreements scheduled to expire at the end of the 2023–24 school year.

The boys track team won the Group II spring / outdoor track state championship in 1949.

The boys track team won the overall public school indoor track state championship in 1967, 1975 (as co-champion) and 1982. The girls team was the all-group co-champion in 1979.

The boys baseball team won the North I Group III state sectional championship in 1964 and 1966, won the North I Group II state sectional title in 1970 and earned the Group I state championship in 2008. The 2008 team won the North II Group I state sectional championship over Weehawken High School, and the BCSL National Division, and went on to take the program's first ever state championship, winning the Group I title with a 7–3 win in the tournmanet final against Robbinsville High School, earning the school's first group championship in 40 years.

The football team won the NJSIAA North I Group II state sectional championship in 1983 and 2019. Finishing the season 11–0, the 1983 team defeated Newton High School by a score of 28–6 in the North I Group II championship game. The 2019 team defeated Parsippany High School by a score of 26–7 in the finals of the playoffs to win the North I Group II sectional championship for the second time.

The 1990 girls volleyball team finished the season with a 19–2 record after winning the Group II state championship against runner-up Rutherford High School in two games (15-4, 15–3) in the tournament final.

The bowling team won the Group I state championship in 2015 and went on to win the Tournament of Champions, defeating Group IV champion Freehold Township High School in the finals.

Led by Patrick Rono (son of Olympian gold-medalist Peter Rono) who won the 2010 Group I individual title, the Golden Bears men's cross country team won their first North Jersey Group I sectional title, and would repeat as champions in 2013 and 2014. 2010 marked the first time the Bears qualified for the Bergen County Meet of Champions as a team. Rono finished seventh at the Foot Locker Northeast Regional in Sunken Meadow State Park in Kings Park, New York; The finish earned a spot to Foot Locker Nationals, held in Balboa Park in San Diego, making Rono the first male runner from North Jersey to earn an invitation in two decades. Rono finished 24th in a race with 40 of the nation's elite runners.

== Administration ==
The school's principal is Laura Vuono. Her administration team includes the assistant principal.

== Notable alumni ==
- Gabriel M. Ambrosio (1938-2013), politician who represented the 36th Legislative District in the New Jersey Senate,
- Anthony J. Cirone (born 1941), percussionist with the San Francisco Symphony under Maestro Josef Krips
- Christine Ann Denny (class of 2001), neuroscientist whose research focuses on the molecular mechanisms underlying learning and memory
- Melissa Fumero (born 1982), actress who has appeared in Brooklyn Nine-Nine and One Life to Live
- Mackenzie Gress (born 2004), soccer player who plays as a goalkeeper for the Penn State Nittany Lions
- Alexia Jorge (born 2003, class of 2021), professional baseball catcher for the San Francisco Firebells of the Women's Pro Baseball League
- Elizabeth Lindsay (1912-2013), track and field athlete and Girl Scout activist
- Tom Longo (1942-2015), defensive back who played in the NFL for the New York Giants
- Donny Pritzlaff (born 1979, class of 1997), freestyle wrestler who represented the United States in international competition, winning bronze medals at the 2006 World Wrestling Championships and at the 2007 FILA Wrestling World Cup, after being a three-time NJSIAA individual state champion at Lyndhurst and finishing his high school wrestling career with a record of 127–4
- Carmine Savino (1911–1993), lawyer, newspaper editor and politician who served for ten years in the New Jersey General Assembly
- Jimmy Smagula (born 1976), actor who has appeared in The Sopranos, Bones, Grey's Anatomy, Parks and Recreation and Rizzoli & Isles as well as films such as The Island and The Producers
- Jim Tooey (born 1954), actor
