= Christine Ann Denny =

American neuroscientist

- Education: Boston College
- Known for: ArcCreERT2 transgenic mouse line for memory tracing
- Awards: NIH Early Independence Award, ELabNYC Fellow, Inductee into the Lyndhurst High School Academic Hall Of Fame, Brain & Behavior Research Foundation NARSAD Young Investigator Award, American Society for Neurochemistry Travel Award, Molecular and Cellular Cognition Society Young Travel Fellowship
- Scientific career
- Fields: Neuroscience
- Workplaces: Columbia University

Christine Denny is an American neuroscientist and associate professor of Clinical Neurobiology in Psychiatry in the Department of Psychiatry at Columbia University Irving Medical Center in New York City. Denny investigates the molecular mechanisms underlying learning and memory. She developed a novel technique to label neurons that encode specific memories. She used this technique to probe what happens to hippocampal memory traces in different disease states.

== Early life and education ==
Denny grew up in Lyndhurst, New Jersey and attended Lyndhurst High School. Denny excelled in her academic pursuits in high school and received multiple scholarships, was recognized for her leadership at the state level, and graduated as class Salutatorian. Denny was also actively involved in athletics and received varsity letters in volleyball and track and field.

After graduating from Lyndhurst in 2001, Denny then pursued her undergraduate studies at Boston College where she received a Bachelors of Science majoring in Biological Sciences and minoring in Theology. While at Boston College, Denny continued to excel in academics as she maintained Honor and Dean's List standing but she also became interested in research and received an Advanced Undergraduate Research Fellowship to support her research. In 2004, Denny began roles as a teaching assistant and laboratory instructor at Boston College. After she graduated in 2005, Denny continued in academia pursuing a master's degree in biology at Boston College. While at Boston College, Denny worked under the mentorship of Thomas N. Seyfried studying lipid storage diseases and metabolic therapies to treat brain diseases. In 2007, Denny published a first author paper in the Journal of Neurochemistry highlighting a model system for assessing retinal pathobiology and therapies for ganglioside storage diseases. Denny also explored lipid abnormalities in mouse models of Rett syndrome as well as the effects of ketogenic diets on alleviating symptoms of Sandhoff disease, a ganglioside storage disease.

Denny then pursued a PhD in neuroscience at Columbia University under the mentorship of Dr. Rene Hen. Denny first explored hippocampal neurogenesis and published a first author paper in 2010 showing that inhibiting neurogenesis increases novel object exploration and impairs one trial contextual fear-learning in mice suggesting an important role for adult born neurons in cognitive function. Denny then began to exploring the idea of memory traces, cells in the brain where memories are stored, and tried to tag these memory traces in the dentate gyrus and CA3 regions of the hippocampus. She was able to develop a genetic tool that enabled her to fluorescently tag neurons that were activated in specific memories. Since her tool enabled long term labelling of memory associated neurons, she is able to observe memory traces over time and reported that memory traces become more faint over time even though learned behaviors persist. Her findings highlights the possibility that these memory traces are being redistributed to areas other than the hippocampus for even longer-term storage. She further used optogenetics to silence the cells involved the memory trace of contextual fear learning and showed that silencing inhibited expression of learned fear memories. Her work led to a first author paper in Neuron in 2014. Denny completed her PhD in 2012, and remained at Columbia to conduct postdoctoral work until 2013 in the Hen Laboratory.

== Career and research ==
After receiving an NIH DP5 Early Independence Award, Denny started her own lab at Columbia University in 2013 and began her position as an assistant professor of Clinical Neurobiology in Psychiatry. Denny also holds the title of Research Scientist V in the Division of Systems Neuroscience at the New York State Psychiatric Institute. The research focus of the Denny Lab is understanding the neural basis of learning and memory and how these processes are altered in disease states such as Alzheimer's disease and depression. Denny's Lab uses the transgenic mice she helped develop in graduate school, ArcCreERT2 mice, to label memory traces and investigate what happens to them in disease models. In 2015, Denny and her colleagues optimized their technique by using a more specific and time limited selective estrogen receptor modulator called 4-hydroxy tamoxifen instead of regular tamoxifen. This technique refined the ability to selectively label memory traces. Using this technique, Denny labelled neurons involved in novel social interaction and found that reactivation of these neurons during expression of learned fear responses decreases freezing. These findings suggested the possibility of social neural circuits within the infralimbic prefrontal cortex as a therapeutic target for ameliorating anxiety or other disorders of learned fear associations. In 2017, Denny then crossed her ArcCreERT2 mouse line with an Alzheimer's model mouse line (APP/PS1) to look at memory traces in a neurodegenerative disease model. When they specifically reactivated neuronal ensembles in the dentate gyrus implicated in contextual fear conditioning in APP/PS1 mice, they found a significant increase in memory retrieval compared to controls suggesting that activated previously learned memory traces in the dentate gyrus might rescue memory loss phenotypes in disease.

Denny's lab also investigates small molecule prophylactics for stress-induced depressive-like behavior. Since psychiatric illnesses often follow stressful events, Denny has proposed the importance of prophylactic therapies in preventing susceptible individuals from developing psychiatric disorders after stressful events. One of the molecules Denny has been exploring the prophylactic therapeutic benefit of is ketamine, a fast acting antidepressant. In 2015, Denny found that when ketamine is administered one week prior to various stress paradigms in mice, the effects of the stress paradigm are ameliorated and they do not show as robust depressive phenotypes. In a follow-up paper in 2017, Denny and her lab found that administering ketamine right before or right after a fearful event did not protect against fearful events, while administration one week before a stressful event still seemed to provide prophylactic effects and decrease fear responses. After these findings, Denny was interested in looking at the markers of stress resilience following ketamine treatment. In a Nature paper in 2018, Denny found 8 metabolites that were changed in the prefrontal cortex and hippocampus after ketamine administration. One novel finding was that precursors to inhibitory neurotransmitters were increased whereas those for excitatory neurotransmitters were decreased. This was one of the first findings showing a substrate for the prophylactic effects of ketamine on stress-induced depression. Denny then looked at another prophylactic in comparison to ketamine, prucalopride - a 5-HT4Rgonist, and found that both have the ability to decrease stress-induced depressive-like behaviors and both alter AMPAR mediated synaptic transmission in the CA3 of the hippocampus.

== Awards and honors ==
- NIH Early Independence Award
- NIH Transformative Award
- ELabNYC Fellow
- 2017 Inductee into the Lyndhurst High School Academic Hall Of Fame
- Brain & Behavior Research Foundation (BBRF), NARSAD Young Investigator Award, 2015-2017
- American Society for Neurochemistry (ASN) Travel Award
- Molecular and Cellular Cognition Society Young Travel Fellowship

== Publications ==
- Cazzulino AS, Martinez R, Tomm NK, and Denny CA. (2015) Improved specificity of hippocampal memory trace labeling. Hippocampus.
- Brachman RA, McGowan JC, Perusini JN, Lim SC, Pham TH, Faye C, Gardier AM, Mendez-David I, David DJ, Hen R, and Denny CA. (2015) Ketamine as a prophylactic against stress-induced depressive-like behavior. Biological Psychiatry. (in press).
- Root CM, Denny CA, Hen R, and Axel R. (2014) The participation of cortical amygdala in innate, odour-driven behaviour. Nature 515:269-273. PMID 25383519.
- Denny CA, Kheirbek MA, Alba EL, Tanaka KF, Brachman RA, Laughman KB, Tomm NK, Turi GF, Losonczy A, and Hen R. (2014) Hippocampal memory traces are differentially modulated by experience, time, and adult neurogenesis. Neuron 83:189-201. PMID 24991962.
- Oury F, Khrimian L, Denny CA, Gardin A, Chamouni A, Goeden N, Huang Y, Srinivas P, Gao X-B, Suyama S, Thomas L, Mann JJ, Horvath T, Bonnin A, and Karsenty G. (2013) Maternal and offspring pools of osteocalcin influence brain development and functions. Cell. 26:228-241. PMID 24074871.
- Denny CA, Burghardt NS, Schacter DM, Hen R, and Drew MR. (2012) 4- to 6-week-old adult-born hippocampal neurons influence novelty-evoked exploration and contextual fear conditioning. Hippocampus. 22:1188-1201. PMID 21739523.
- Drew MR, Denny CA, and Hen R. (2010) Arrest of adult hippocampal neurogenesis impairs single- but not multiple-trial contextual fear conditioning. Behav Neurosci. 124:446-454. PMID 20695644.
- Pollak DD, Monje FJ, Zuckerman L, Denny CA, Drew MR, and Kandel ER. (2008) An animal model of a behavioral intervention for depression. Neuron 60, 149–161. PMID 18940595.
