= Bottom of the 9th (film) =

2019 American film directed by Raymond De Felitta

- Theatrical release poster
- Directed by: Raymond De Felitta
- Written by: Robert Bruzio
- Produced by: William Chartoff; Eric Fischer; Lynn Hendee; Joe Manganiello; Nick Manganiello
- Starring: Joe Manganiello; Sofía Vergara; Michael Rispoli; Denis O'Hare
- Cinematography: Barry Markowitz
- Edited by: David Leonard
- Music by: Stephen Endelman
- Production companies: Piccadilly Pictures; Aurora Media; Off the Chart Inc.; 3:59
- Distributed by: Saban Films
- Release date: July 19, 2019 (United States)
- Running time: 111 minutes
- Country: United States
- Language: English
- Box office: $2,049

Bottom of the 9th is an American drama film, directed by Raymond De Felitta, from a screenplay by Robert Bruzio. The movie's original title is STANO. It stars Joe Manganiello, Sofía Vergara, Michael Rispoli and Denis O'Hare.

== Plot ==
After serving 17 years in prison for a violent mistake, Sonny returns to his Bronx neighborhood and to his baseball aspirations.

== Cast ==
- Joe Manganiello as Sonny Stano
  - Kevin William Paul as Young Sonny Stano
- Sofía Vergara as Angela Ramirez
- Denis O'Hare as Officer Lonergan
- Michael Rispoli as Coach Harris
- Michael Maize as Tommy
- Vincent Pastore as Cosmo
- James Madio as Joey Cosenza
- Robert Bruzio as Bobby
- Burt Young as Scaleri
- Jimmy Smagula

== Production ==
In July 2017, Joe Manganiello and Sofía Vergara joined the cast of the film, with Raymond De Felitta directing from a screenplay by Robert Bruzio. Manganiello will also serve as a producer on the film alongside Nick Manganiello, Bill Chartoff, Lynn Hendee, Eric Fischer through their 3:59 and Off the Chart Entertainment banners, respectively. In August 2017, Kevin William Paul, Jimmy Smagula and James Madio joined the cast of the film. In September 2017, Denis O'Hare, Michael Rispoli and Vincent Pastore joined the cast of the film.

== Release ==
In May 2019, Saban Films acquired distribution rights to the film, and released it on July 19, 2019.

== Reception ==
Bottom of the 9th holds a 69% approval rating on review aggregator website Rotten Tomatoes, based on 13 reviews, with an average of 5.7/10. On Metacritic, the film holds a rating of 58 out of 100, based on 7 critics, indicating "mixed or average" reviews.

== See also ==
- List of baseball films
