= Michael Bell (artist) =

American artist

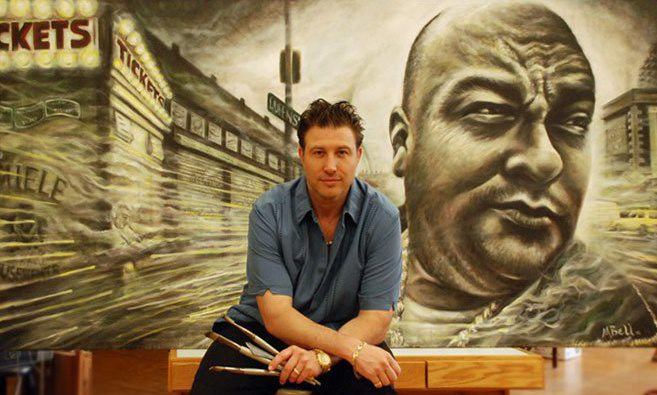
- Michael Bell, In Studio
- Education: Lycoming College in Williamsport, Pennsylvania
- Known for: Painting, Murals, Screenwriting

Michael Bell is an American portrait painter, muralist, screenwriter and author. He has painted portraits of John Gotti and actors from Mafia dramas The Sopranos, Goodfellas and A Bronx Tale. Bell is an anti-bullying and Autism activist. In June, 2017 Bell published his memoir "Dual Lives: from the Streets to the Studio".

== Early life and education ==
At the age of five Bell won the first juried art exhibition he entered. As a young artist he spent a lot of his time in and around New York City studying art with his maternal grandmother, Violet Vallery, a self-taught artist from Lyndhurst, New Jersey, where Bell was raised.

Bell has a Bachelor of Fine Arts in Painting from Lycoming College and a Master of Education in Art Education from Towson University.

== Career ==
Michael Bell, while becoming one of the most highly regarded art teachers in the US, spent his evenings painting portraits of mob bosses. In 2017 Bell published "DUAL LIVES: from the Streets to the Studio", which chronicles Bell's rise as an educator and portraitist who painted for the likes of John Gotti and actors from The Sopranos.

As an artist, Bell is a pioneer of the Visual Journaling movement, and is active delivering workshops throughout the United States and donating his paintings for sale by charities.

His art career began painting portraits for John Gotti, which led to receiving commissions to paint actors who play Mafia members in movies and on television, including from The Sopranos, Goodfellas and A Bronx Tale. Bell published his first screenplay in 2008, based on stories behind his real life "Ticket to Ride" paintings. Later in 2008, Bell was commissioned to paint another portrait for The Sopranos actor Joseph R. Gannascoli to benefit the Bright Steps Forward charitable foundation and Autism awareness.

In 2009 Bell was selected for a national speaking engagement in Washington, DC on “Arts, innovation and design” for Arne Duncan, US Secretary of Education. In 2010 Bell earned the highest credential of becoming a National Board Certified teacher, while also producing his first of seven back-to-back NAEA National Rising Star award winners.

In 2012, Bell partnered with artist Eric Fischl to contribute artworks for his America: Now and Here project, unveiled at the NAEA National Convention in New York City. In 2013, Bell was moved by Amanda Todd's tragic story and created a portrait as a tribute to the fallen B.C. teen. The painting evolved into an anti-bullying project and YouTube video. Later that same year, Bell painted a series of portraits for Mob Wives' Toni Marie Ricci.

In 2013 Bell also received three national teaching awards - the College Board William U. Harris Award of Excellence in Brooklyn, NY; The Washington Post Agnes Meyer Outstanding Teacher of the Year Award in Washington, DC; and the National Art Education Association National Art Honor Society Sponsor of the Year in Fort Worth, TX Additionally, Bell received the Dr. James E. Douthat Outstanding Achievement Award from Lycoming College, given in recognition of alumni who have achieved significant accomplishments that reflect positively on his college.

In 2014, Bell painted portraits for Dominic Capone III, which were unveiled on The Capones, a reality tv series on Reelz. In 2015 Bell was commissioned to paint the official portrait of John A. Gotti for his Shadow of my Father memoir that was featured on the cover of the New York Daily News, and later on the A&E (TV network) series Gotti: Godfather & Son directed by Richard Stratton. This led to Bell delivering a TED (conference) talk on March 8, 2016 in the Ciccone Theater at Bergen Community College on “Drawing a Line from your Life to your Art”, sharing “how each of us has a story to tell.”

Bell said he and Gotti are close and that Gotti has been very supportive of Bell's son, who was diagnosed with Autism in 2015. Bell's son's diagnosis inspired Bell to write DUAL LIVES: from the Streets to the Studio, published in 2017, backed by a list of notable contributors, including a foreword by Peter J. Gotti and excerpts from John A. Gotti, Dominic Capone, Eric Fischl, Art Critic Jerry Saltz, New York Times best-selling authors Jay Mathews and Daniel Pink, Pulitzer Prize-winning photographer David J. Leeson, Sopranos Joseph R. Gannascoli, two-time boxing world champion Paulie Malignaggi and celebrity chef Steve Martorano.

== Awards and honors ==
2014 - 2016: Scholastic Arts National Gold Medalist Teacher
2013: Washington Post Agnes Meyer Outstanding Teacher of the Year
2013: William U. Harris National Award of Excellence
2013: NAEA National Art Honor Society Sponsor of the Year Award
2010: National Board Certification
2010: Appointed to Superintendent's Teacher Advisory Council
2009: National Blue Ribbon Presenter, USDE, Washington D.C.
2005: Los Angeles Good Shepherd Community Service Award
2004: Anne Arundel County Public School's Teacher of the Year
2003: Who's Who Among America's Teachers
2002: Maryland Art Education Association's Most Outstanding Arts Educator of the Year Award
2001: State Superintendent Commendation for Post September 11 Relief Efforts
