= BUR Barbell Company =

American fitness equipment manufacturer

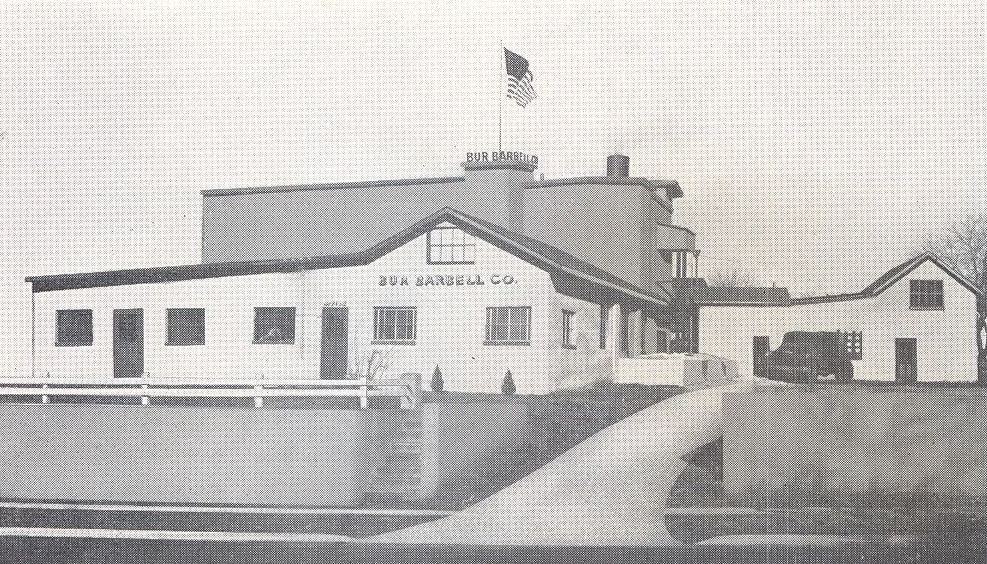
BUR Barbell Factory in Lyndhurst, New Jersey

The BUR Barbell Company was a privately held American physical fitness equipment manufacturer that was in operation from 1928 until 1966. The company traces its origins to Bradenton, Florida, and Birmingham, Alabama. After the Second World War, operations were relocated to Lyndhurst, New Jersey to take advantage of the rapid economic and population growth in the region. At one time, BUR Barbell was the second largest producer of barbells in the United States.

BUR manufactured a limited selection of weight training products that further narrowed over time until, by the early 1950s, it consisted of a single barbell/dumbbell set and the component parts. BUR Barbell produced plates for sale under its own name as well as for companies such as the Jackson International Barbell Company (sold as the Jackson "Economy" standard plates), the Dan Lurie Barbell Company, and Ace Barbell.

== Management ==
The President and founder of the BUR Barbell Company was David "Dave" Collins Hall. His wife, Kathryn Hall, was Corporate Secretary and Office Manager of the Lyndhurst facility.

== History ==
=== Early years ===
David C. Hall taught both math and science in Palm Harbor, Florida, and was a high school principal for several years. It was during this time that he laid the groundwork for what was to eventually become the BUR Barbell Company of Bradenton, Florida. BUR Barbell Company officially began operations in 1928. The first three years of operation were spent in planning and product design. Product manufacturing started in 1931. From the beginning, all BUR branded products were produced in the company's own foundries.

From 1931 until 1941, BUR produced various free weight products at its Bradenton facility. These products could be purchased via mail order for shipment throughout the United States. Sometime during this period, additional foundries were established in Alabama and – reportedly – in other southern states as well. Barbell production appears to have stopped during the war but was restarted shortly thereafter.

For three years, during the Second World War, Mr. Hall served as an officer on the staff of Admiral Nimitz in the South Pacific. He was decorated in the Philippine Campaign.

After the war ended, a decision was made to move the BUR Barbell Company headquarters from Florida to New Jersey.

=== Factory in Lyndhurst, New Jersey ===
From 1946 until 1966, the Bur Barbell Company occupied a 3-acre property on Orient Way in Lyndhurst, New Jersey. The headquarters and production facility were built from the ground up and included a foundry, machine, pattern shop, and onsite railroad siding. This layout allowed for a great degree of control over the manufacturing and distribution process and for reaping the cost savings that could be achieved through vertical integration.

Scrap metal was the primary source material for the BUR foundry. Eyewitnesses report that, at any given time, there were large piles of scrap metal on the property easily visible from the street.

In the 1950s, the demand for BUR barbell sets sometimes outstripped the supply. During the holiday seasons, long lines of prospective customers could be seen onsite placing orders for future delivery.

=== End ===
In 1966, Dave Hall, died at the age of 58. At the time, there was some industry speculation that the BUR Barbell Company would continue to operate under the management of other family members. However, there is no evidence that this ever came to pass. The BUR Lyndhurst facility was shuttered between 1966 and 1967. The 3-acre property went unoccupied for several years until, in the 1970s, it was sold to a non-manufacturing concern. At that time, the barbell factory was torn down.

== Product types ==
BUR Barbell produced a limited line of free-weight products. This approach kept manufacturing simple and efficient and allowed for the production of a quality product at a lower price than many competitors could achieve.

With the exception of the "BUR Quick Change" set, standard plate sizing was the norm. BUR did not manufacture Olympic bars or Olympic-sized plates. The original BUR-BEL plates had a center hole diameter of 1-1/4" and were designed to fit a 1-1/16" bar. Sometime in the 1950s, the bar diameter was reduced to 1" and the plates were drilled with a 1-1/16" hole.

During its 38 years of operation, BUR Barbell offered the following products:

Barbell Sets

85, 105, 175, 185, 275, and 285 Pound BUR-BEL Sets – These were offered in both "Standard" (unmarked) and "Deluxe" (BUR-BEL) versions.

BUR Quick Change Set - The "BUR Quick Change" was a barbell with slotted ends. Quick Change weights were U-shaped and slotted - not round - and had hooks attached to them. These hooks allowed for the quick and easy loading and unloading of weight plates. The BUR Quick Change was patented in 1930 and first offered for sale in 1938 for $60 ($930 in 2010 dollars).

95 Pound Set – A standard/deluxe set offered via mail-order.

100 Pound Set – A standard set offered via mail-order.

110 Pound Set – A standard set offered during the 1950s and 1960s and advertised as the "finest ever manufactured".

185 Pound Set – This "Deluxe" set was sold during the 1930s and 1940s under the BUR-BEL brand and included 155 pounds of plates, a standard bar, dumbbell handles with collars, and – unlike later sets – kettlebell handles and iron boots.

BUR-130 – Sometime in the early-1950s, the "BUR-130" became the only barbell set offered. It set consisted of a 4-1/2’ knurled pipe bar, dumbbells with fixed collars, and 110 pounds of weight plates.

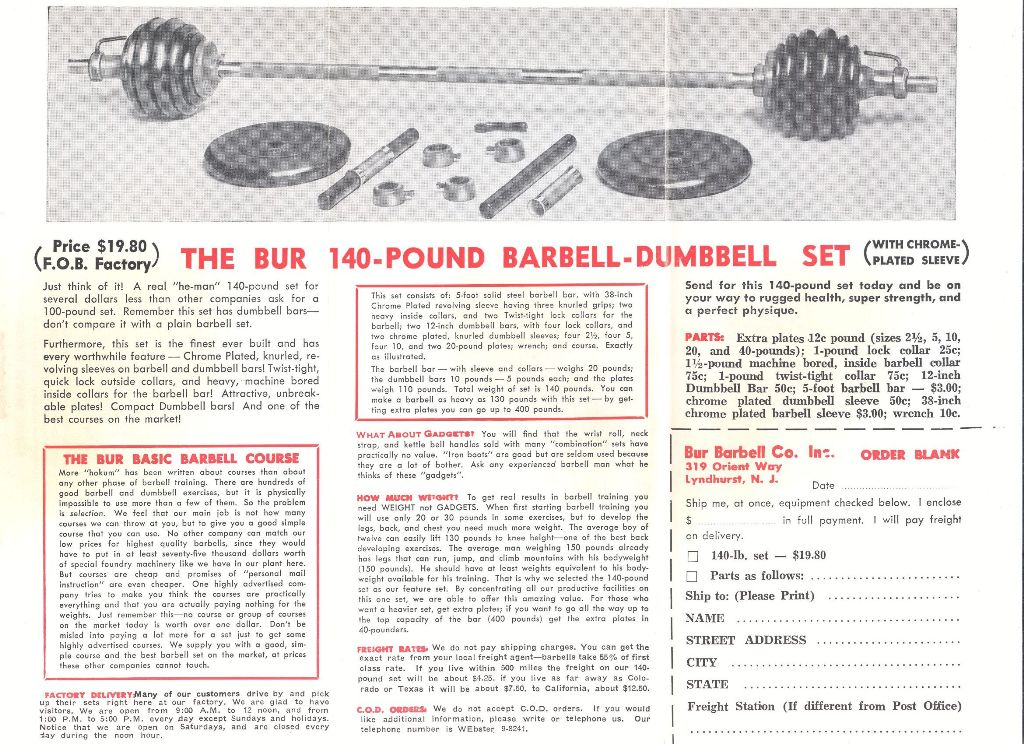
Mid-1950s "BUR-140" Brochure

BUR-140 – The "BUR-140" is arguably the best known BUR product. It replaced the BUR-130. Unlike previous BUR sets, the BUR-140 came with a 38-inch chrome-plated and knurled revolving barbell sleeve. This sleeve increased the grip diameter of the 5-foot (1.5 m) steel bar from 1" to 1-1/8". The set's dumbbells also included removable revolving sleeves. Finally, the BUR-140 came with BUR's own oversized inner collars; these collars were machined to allow the bar sleeve to rotate freely while simultaneously eliminating the gaps between sleeve and collars that were common at the time. According to BUR brochures, the new bar could support a maximum weight of 400-pounds. The BUR-140 sold for $16.80 in the early 1950s (about $140 in 2010 adjusted dollars) and was still being produced when the company closed in the 1960s.

Custom Sets
Although – in its advertising literature – BUR often stressed the advantages of purchasing one of its "feature" barbell sets, the company also sold customized sets upon customer request.

Dumbbells
Throughout its history, BUR offered several different dumbbell variations. The earliest BUR dumbbell was a simple bar with four removable collars. Later versions included a welded on sleeve. The final BUR dumbbell design consisted of a standard 12-inch bar with a removable chrome-plated flanged sleeve and two standard collars.

Multifunctional Exercise Stand
This product, introduced in the mid-1950s, was an exercise stand that could be used as a Squat Rack, Prone Bench, Abdominal Board, Leg Raise, Dip Station, etc.

Kettlebell Handles
Kettlebell handles were offered with the BUR 185 pound set. Eventually, they were discontinued. Later BUR advertising branded kettlebell handles as "gadgets" with "practically no value".

Iron Boots
During the 1930s and 1940s, the BUR Barbell Company sold iron boots under the trade name "BUR Foot-Weight". Unlike traditional iron boots, the BUR Foot-Weight design called for weights to be attached to the bottom of the boot rather than to the sides. Iron boots were included with both the BUR Quick Change Set and the BUR 185 Pound Set. The sale of iron boots was eventually discontinued.

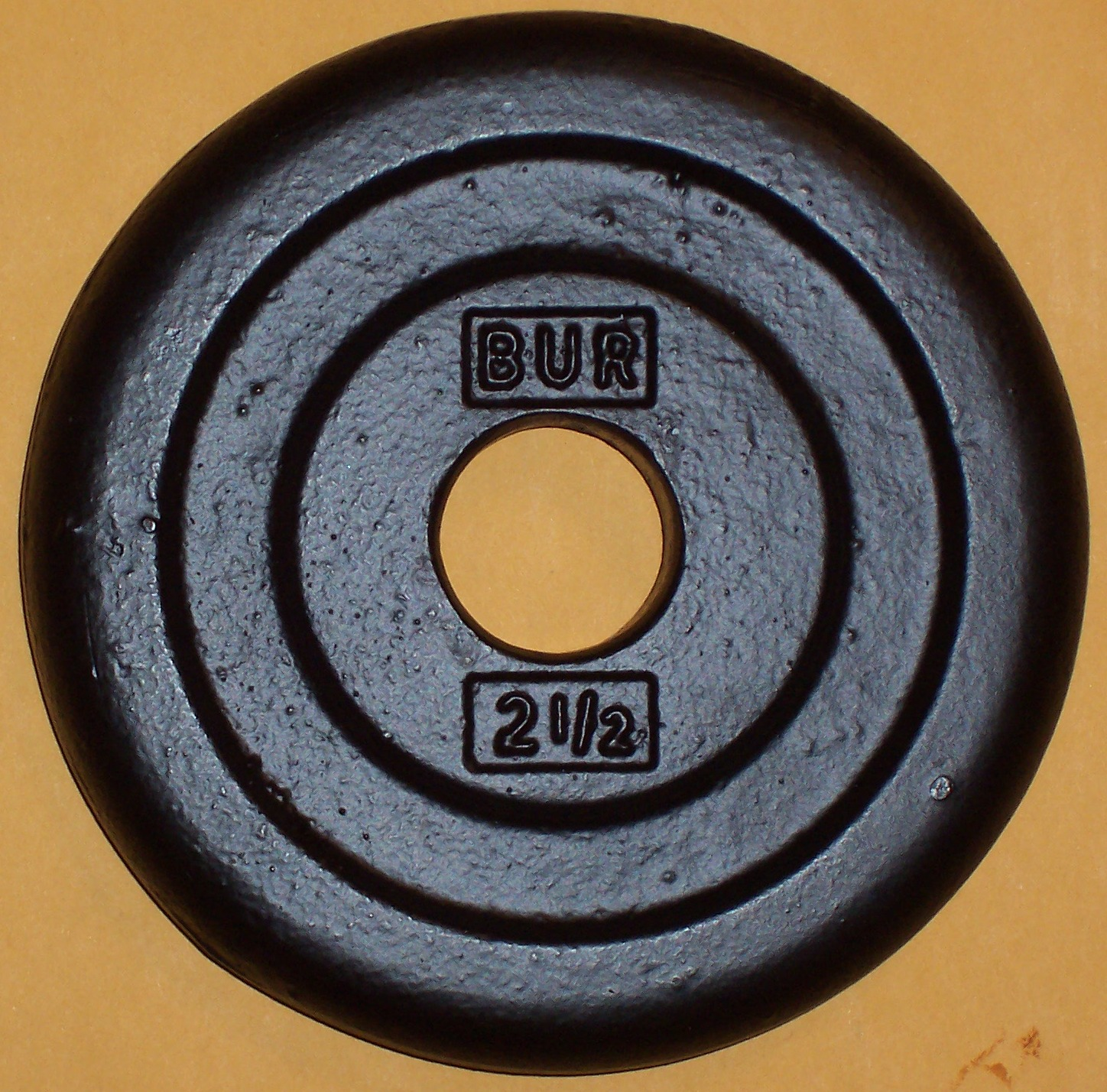
BUR 2.5lb Weight Plate

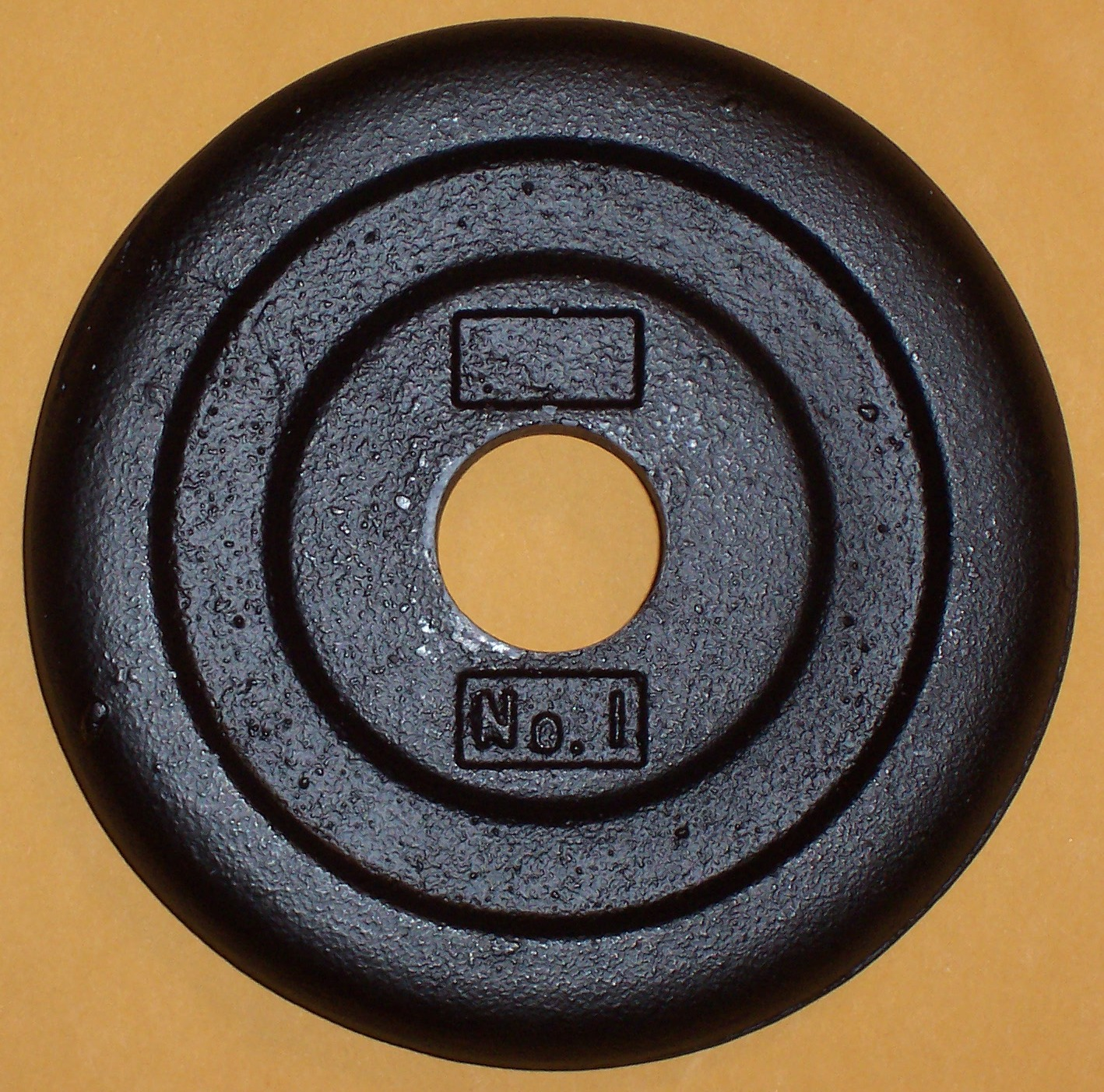
BUR No.1 Weight Plate

Weight Plates
BUR sold standard weight plates via mail-order and factory direct in Lyndhurst. BUR plates were shorter and thicker than competitor's plates were. This gave BUR plates the advantage of being virtually "unbreakable". Unfortunately, the increased thickness also meant that fewer plates could fit on any given bar. BUR plates were offered only in American pounds; the metric system was never used for any BUR branded product.

Bars and Collars
From the early 1930s until the early 1950s, BUR sold a standard 1-1/16" bar. Collars were attached separately. Most, if not all, of these bars were knurled in 3 places. None had a separate revolving sleeve. There were no markings on the BUR bars or collars to distinguish these from the bars or collars of other manufacturers. Bar lengths ranged from 4’ to 6’. In the 1950s, with the introduction of the BUR-140, BUR began selling a bar with a 1" diameter and a removable 38" chrome plated sleeve that allowed for bar rotation during lifts. BUR oversized inner collars were included with the new bar. These collars were stamped "BUR BARBELL Co LYNDHURST NEW JERSEY". Finally, for a brief period during the 1950s, BUR also offered a 10-pound hollow bar with welded on end-caps.

== Product notes ==
BUR-BEL vs. BUR
From 1931 until the early 1950s, the "BUR-BEL" trade-name was stamped on BUR Barbell plates. In the early years, the name was stamped on all plates. By 1940, it was only found on certain "Deluxe" sets. Even without the name stamp, BUR-BEL era plates can be distinguished from other BUR plates by differences in design and a larger center hole diameter (1-1/4" vs. 1-1/16").

In the 1950s, the name "BUR" replaced "BUR-BEL" on all plates. "BUR" was usually stamped on the front of every plate intended for sale with BUR sets. Plates cast for other barbell companies did not have this marking. In addition, plates manufactured for ACE Barbell had the name "ACE" stamped where the name "BUR" would normally be; these plates were identical in all other respects. BUR Barbell collars were also stamped "BUR".

In the early 1960s, the name "BUR" was removed from the plate design. The new plates included only the poundage. This allowed for greater manufacturing standardization and helped keep costs (and prices) down. The name "BUR" continued to be stamped on the barbell collars until all production ended.

The BUR Numbering System
Another factor that distinguished BUR Barbell plates from those of other manufacturers was the use of a unique numbering system. From the late 1930s until the early 1960s, every BUR weight plate had a separate number - besides poundage - stamped into it. These numbers were meant to work with an exercise record keeping system designed by Dave Hall. Even some of the plates that BUR manufactured for other barbell companies had these numbers stamped into them.

Plate Stamp	Weight
No.0	1-1/4 lbs. (BUR-BEL only)
No.1	2-1/2 lbs.
No.2	5 lbs.
No.3	10 lbs.
No.4	20 lbs.
No.5	40 lbs.
No.6	50 lbs. (BUR-BEL only)

The BUR numbering system was discontinued in the 1960s.

== Corporate publications and advertising ==
Publications

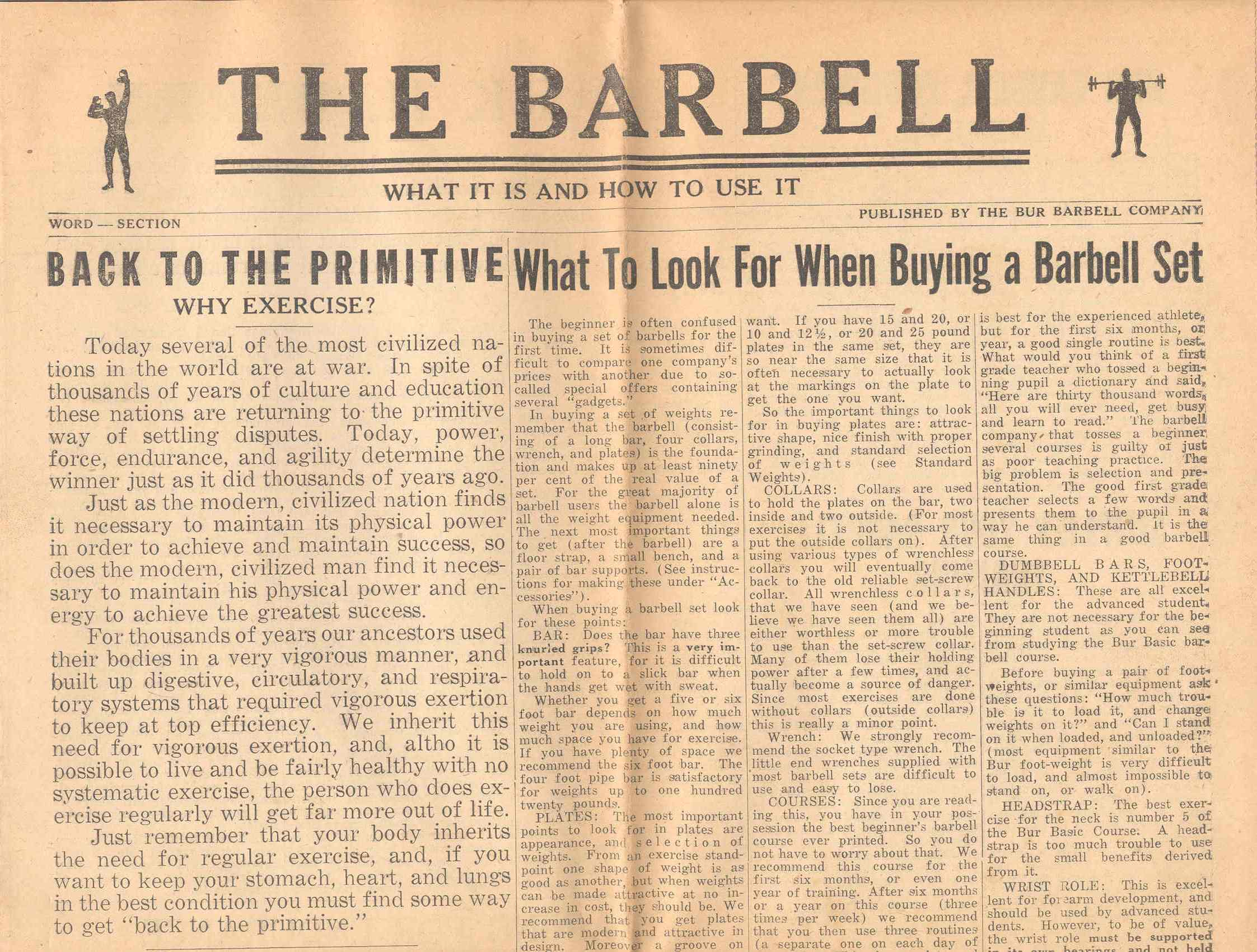
"The Barbell" - 1940

From August 1939, until January 1940, the BUR Barbell Company published, "The Barbell." This was a four-page newsletter written and edited by Dave Hall and Mark Berry (who was listed as "Head Physical Trainer for the BUR Barbell Company" at the time).

All other publications from the BUR Barbell Company came in the form of advertisements, articles in magazines produced by others, and letters to prospective customers.

Advertising
Starting around 1941, with time off for the War, and resuming in early 1946, Bur Barbell began advertising in Popular Science magazine and Popular Mechanics magazine. This practice continued until 1964.
