= Jim Tooey =

American actor (born 1954)

- Born: June 21, 1954 (age 72); Jersey City, New Jersey, U.S.

James Donald Tuohy (born June 21, 1954), known professionally as Jim Tooey, is an American film actor who has appeared in a total of 20 movies.

Born in Jersey City, Tuohy moved to Lyndhurst, New Jersey, at the age of 12, where he attended Lyndhurst High School before moving on to William Paterson University where he first developed an interest in acting.

== Filmography ==
- Foreign Exchange (2008) - Mr. Devina
- Off Jackson Avenue (2008) (HBO Latin Film Festival) - Russ
- Gardener of Eden (2007) - Loudmouth
- Running Scared (2006) - Tony
- Hot Under the Collar (2006) (TV) -
- The Producers (2005) - Convict
- Stand By (2003) - Vinny
- Eloise at the Plaza (2003) (TV) (uncredited) - Doorman
- Cremaster 3 (2002) - Grand Master
