= Jimmy Smagula =

American actor (born 1976)

- Born: James Paul Smagula; January 15, 1976 (age 50); Lyndhurst, New Jersey, U.S.
- Occupation: Actor
- Years active: 1998–present

James Paul Smagula (born January 15, 1976) is an American actor. He is best known for his work in theatre as well as television series such as The Sopranos, Bones, Grey's Anatomy, Parks and Recreation, and Rizzoli & Isles as well as films, including The Island and The Producers.

He played Sir Bedevere and others in the Broadway revival of Spamalot at the St. James Theatre.

== Early life ==
Smagula grew up in Lyndhurst, New Jersey and graduated from Lyndhurst High School in 1993. As a child, he was very active in music, playing piano, trumpet, and clarinet and taking private voice lessons. He auditioned for, and was accepted into, the acclaimed City Kids Repertory company in New York City at age 15 where he shared the stage with such artists as Whitney Houston, Gloria Estefan, and Demi Moore.

He went on to earn a BFA at New York University's Tisch School of the Arts in 1997 where he studied at both CAP 21 and The Classical Studio.

== Career ==
Smagula made his professional acting debut at age 20 in the Paper Mill Playhouse production of Man of La Mancha. He also appeared in the American premiere of Children of Eden, also at Paper Mill Playhouse. Smagula also sings on that production's cast album.

Smagula appeared in the ensemble and performed the role of Beadle Bamford in Sweeney Todd: The Demon Barber of Fleet Street at the Ahamanson Theater with Kelsey Grammer and Christine Baranski and also played the Beadle in the Signature Theater production in Arlington, VA, which starred Norm Lewis.

Smagula made his Broadway debut at age 24 in the ensemble of The Full Monty (2000). He performed the principal role of Dave Bukatinsky over 3 dozen times, opposite both Patrick Wilson and Will Chase. In 2002, he appeared in the Broadway revival of Man of La Mancha starring Brian Stokes Mitchell.

Smagula understudied Ubaldo Piangi on the Second National Tour of The Phantom of the Opera and later played the role on the Third National tour. He also would understudy the role on Broadway for one year.

In 2005, Smagula appeared as Sal Iacuzzo on HBO's The Sopranos. He also appeared in the film The Island, directed by Michael Bay and The Producers movie musical.

In 2008, Smagula starred as Rocky in the Encores! production of Damn Yankees! starring Sean Hayes and Jane Krakowski at the New York City Center. Ben Brantley of The New York Times said Smagula "harmonizes sweetly" on the iconic song "Heart."

Smagula appeared in Manhattan Theatre Club's production of To Be or Not To Be at the Friedman Theater on Broadway, directed by Casey Nicholaw.

He also played a 10-week stint as Chef Louis in Disney's The Little Mermaid on Broadway

In 2010, Smagula joined the Broadway company of Billy Elliot, where he performed the principal role of George over 50 times. He also appeared in the film Step Up 3D in 2010.

From 2011 to 2016, Smagula appeared in television shows including Hot in Cleveland, Grey's Anatomy, Jessie, Betty White's Off Their Rockers, Parks and Recreation, Sam and Cat, Brooklyn Nine-Nine, Rizzoli and Isles, Community, and Bones.

In 2017, Smagula played John Woodburn in the film Rebel in the Rye, written and directed by Danny Strong and starring Kevin Spacey and Nicholas Hoult.

From 2019 to 2020, Smagula played Monsieur Thénardier in the national tour of Les Misérables.

In 2022, he played Harry the Horse in Guys and Dolls at The Eisenhower Theater.

In 2023, he played the dual role of Mr./Billy Webster in Stephen Sondheim and James Lapine's Sunday in the Park with George at the Pasadena Playhouse. He also played Sir Bedevere in the Kennedy Center production of Spamalot and reprised the role in the Broadway revival at the St. James Theatre.

== Filmography ==
=== Film ===
Year	Title	Role	Notes
2005	The Island	Extraction Room Technician	
2005	The Producers	Convict	
2010	Step Up 3D	Balloon Vendor	
2015	Genie in a Bikini		
2017	Rebel in the Rye	John Woodburn	
2018	Erase	Kinowski	
2019	Bottom of the 9th		

=== Television ===
Year	Title	Role	Notes
2006	The Sopranos	Sal Iacuzzo	1 episode
2013	Parks and Recreation	Peter	1 episode
2014	Brooklyn Nine-Nine	John Perpton	1 episode
2014	Rizzoli & Isles	Jimmy	1 episode
2015	Community	Dink Dippindots	2 episodes
2015	Bones	Chili Reuben	1 episode
2016	Jimmy Kimmel Live!	Museum Security Guard	1 episode
2018	Corporate	Milk Boy	1 episode
2019	Better Things	Jimmy Smagula	1 episode
2019	Oh Jerome, No	Sammy	1 episode
2019	Cake	Sammy	1 episode
2020-2021	Black Monday	C.O. Dandleton	2 episodes
