= Kingsland Avenue Bridge (Passaic River) =

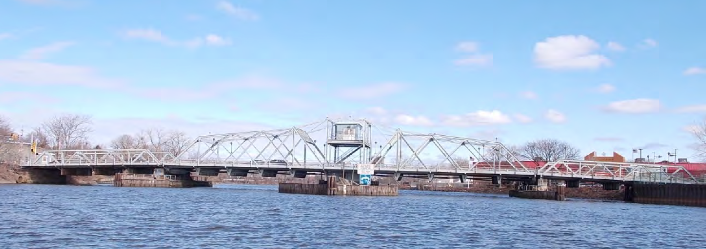
- Coordinates: 40°48′40″N 74°08′19″W
- Carries: Park Avenue to Kingland Avenue
- Crosses: Passaic River
- Locale: Nutley and Lyndhurst, New Jersey
- Other name(s): De Jessa Memorial Bridge; Park Avenue Bridge; Avondale Bridge
- Maintained by: Bergen and Essex
- ID number: 020032A

Characteristics
- Design: Swing bridge
- Total length: 364 feet (111 m)
- Width: 46 feet (14 m)
- No. of spans: 3
- Clearance below: 7 feet (2.1 m) (high water); 12 feet (3.7 m) (low water)

History
- Designer: James Owen (Essex); H.M. Watson (Bergen)
- Fabrication by: New Jersey Bridge Company; F.M. Stillman Company
- Construction start: 1903
- Opened: 1905; 1986 reconstructed

Location
- Interactive map of Kingsland Avenue Bridge

Kingsland Avenue Bridge, earlier known as Avondale Bridge and designated the De Jessa Memorial Bridge, is a vehicular movable bridge over the Passaic River in northeastern New Jersey. It crosses the county line to connect the towns of Lyndhurst in Bergen and Nutley in Essex, originally taking its name from the Kingsland section. The bridge is 10.7 miles (17.2 km) from the river's mouth at Newark Bay, and is required to open on four hours' notice. As of 2010, there were 26,420 daily crossings of the bridge, which provides one lane in each direction.

== History ==
Designed as a joint project between the two counties and built 1903-1905 by the New Jersey Bridge Company, it has a rim-bearing hybrid (pinned/riveted) Warren through truss swing span supported on an ashlar substructure and Warren pony truss approach spans. Rededicated July 14, 1981, in memory of Joseph Carmine De Jessa, a U.S. Marine and the first Lyndhurst native killed in the Vietnam War, the bridge was significantly rehabilitated in 1984.

== Planned reconstruction/replacement ==
The bridge is considered functionally obsolete, meaning that it can no longer handle the traffic demands made upon it when considering such factors as load carrying capacity, vertical, clearance, alignment, and deck geometry. Bergen and Essex have requested that the bridge be re-built by the NJDOT and are acquiring land for a widening of right-of way along approach roads to it. The scope of work could be as extensive as that of the Court Street Bridge on the Hackensack completed in 2012. As of 2014 roadworks in the vicinity of the bridge were under way, but no funding for its repair or replacement had been identified.

In December 2014 the North Jersey Transportation Planning Authority (NJTPA) recommended funding for the concept development for the replacement of the bridge. In September 2015, NJTPA put out a request for proposals to begin the process. As of 2020 NJTPA reported it as a development project.

== See also ==
- Lyndhurst Draw
- List of crossings of the Lower Passaic River
- List of crossings of the Upper Passaic River
