= Off Jackson Avenue =

- Directed by: John-Luke Montias
- Written by: John-Luke Montias
- Produced by: Michiel Pilgram
- Starring: John-Luke Montias
- Cinematography: George Gibson
- Edited by: Michiel Pilgram
- Music by: Ed Tomney
- Production companies: Goltzius Productions; The Group Entertainment; Multivisionnaire Pictures
- Distributed by: Goltzius Productions
- Release dates: 2008 (Vail Film Festival); July 17, 2009 (Quad Cinema)
- Running time: 79 minutes 80 minutes
- Country: United States
- Languages: English; Russian; Spanish; Cantonese; Mandarin; Japanese; Albanian

Off Jackson Avenue is a 2008 American crime thriller drama film written by, directed by and starring John-Luke Montias.

== Cast ==
- Jessica Pimentel as Olivia
- Stivi Paskoski as Milot
- Jun Suenaga as Tomo
- Aya Cash as Olga
- Gene Ruffini as Uncle Jack
- John-Luke Montias as Joey
- Clem Cheung as Eddie Chang
- Daniel Oreskes as Ivan
- Judith Hawking as Donna
- Jim Tooey as Russ
- Michael Gnat as Wall Street Jimmy

== Release ==
The film was released at the Quad Cinema in New York City on July 17, 2009.

== Reception ==
The film has a 59% rating on Rotten Tomatoes based on 17 reviews.

Ronnie Scheib of Variety gave the film a positive review and wrote, "its laid-back absurdist tone and no-nonsense pacing make for an audio-visual delight."

Andrew Schenker of Slant Magazine awarded the film one and a half stars out of four and wrote, "Sex slavery, Japanese hit men, and ordinary car thieves converge on the mean streets of Long Island City in Off Jackson Avenue, John-Luke Montias's engagingly lurid but ultimately tepid crime drama."
