= Mark Berry (weightlifter) =

American weight lifter

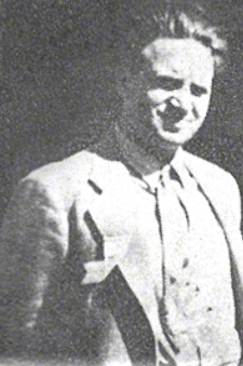
- Born: 1896; Chicago
- Died: 1958 (aged 61–62)
- Occupations: weight lifter, writer

Mark H. Berry (1896–1958) was an American national weight lifting champion, author and trainer.

== Biography ==
Berry was born in Chicago in 1896, the son of an engineer and inventor. He was the U.S. Olympic Weightlifting coach at the 1932 Los Angeles Olympics and the 1936 Berlin Olympics. He was the first Olympic weight lifting coach for the U.S.

After his success as a weight lifter he focused on teaching others. Berry advocated drinking milk and focusing on compound movements especially heavy squats for building power and bulk. He is considered one of the pioneers of weight lifting with his classic books Physical Training Simplified and Physical Improvement. He edited several magazines published through the Milo Barbell Company, these were Strength, The Strongman and Physical Training Notes. Berry became director of the Milo Barbell Company and editor of the Strength magazine in 1926.

Berry was associated with the physical culture movement of strength training, but disliked the movement's connections with lighter exercise, natural living and vegetarianism. Alternative health reformers such as Arnold Ehret, Bernarr Macfadden and Paul Bragg were associated with the physical culture movement but Berry had little in common with them.

== Lifting champion ==
He was a successful feather weight champion in the American continental weight-lifters association (ACWLA) in the mid-1920s.

== Trainer ==
Mark trained a young John Grimek whom he met in the late 1920s. Grimek would later win the Mr. America and Mr. Universe titles. After his success with Grimek and others he was selected to be the head coach for the 1932 and 1936 United States Olympic Weight Lifting Teams, the latter of which John Grimek was a participant. He continued to instruct throughout the 1940s and 1950s as a head physical trainer for the BUR Barbell Company.

== Publications ==
- Physical Training Simplified: The Complete Science of Muscular Development (1930)
- Physical Improvement (1930)
- The Big Biceps Book (1933)
- Your Physique - and Its Culture: An Innovation in Physique Culture (1935)
