= Kingsland, New Jersey =

Populated place in Bergen County, New Jersey, US

- Unincorporated community
- Location of Kingsland in Bergen County Inset: Location of county within the state of New Jersey Kingsland (New Jersey) Kingsland (the United States)
- Coordinates: 40°48′23″N 74°06′40″W
- Country: United States
- State: New Jersey
- County: Bergen
- Township: Lyndhurst
- Elevation: 98 ft (30 m)
- Time zone: UTC−05:00 (Eastern (EST))
  - Summer (DST): UTC−04:00 (EDT)
- GNIS feature ID: 877576

Kingsland is an unincorporated community located within Lyndhurst Township in Bergen County, in the U.S. state of New Jersey. and the site of Kingsland station. The Kingsland Avenue Bridge is nearby.

== History ==
The Kingsland family possessed a large tract of land in the area known as Kingsland Manor. on what was known as New Barbadoes Neck.

In 1872, the Delaware, Lackawanna and Western Railroad established a railway through the township, and erected a depot in the settlement named "Kingsland" in honor of the family. A railroad shop was built, and houses erected for the railroad employees. Church services were held in the train depot.

Kingsland had a post office.

== See also ==
- Kingsland explosion
