= Lyndhurst, New Jersey =

- Township
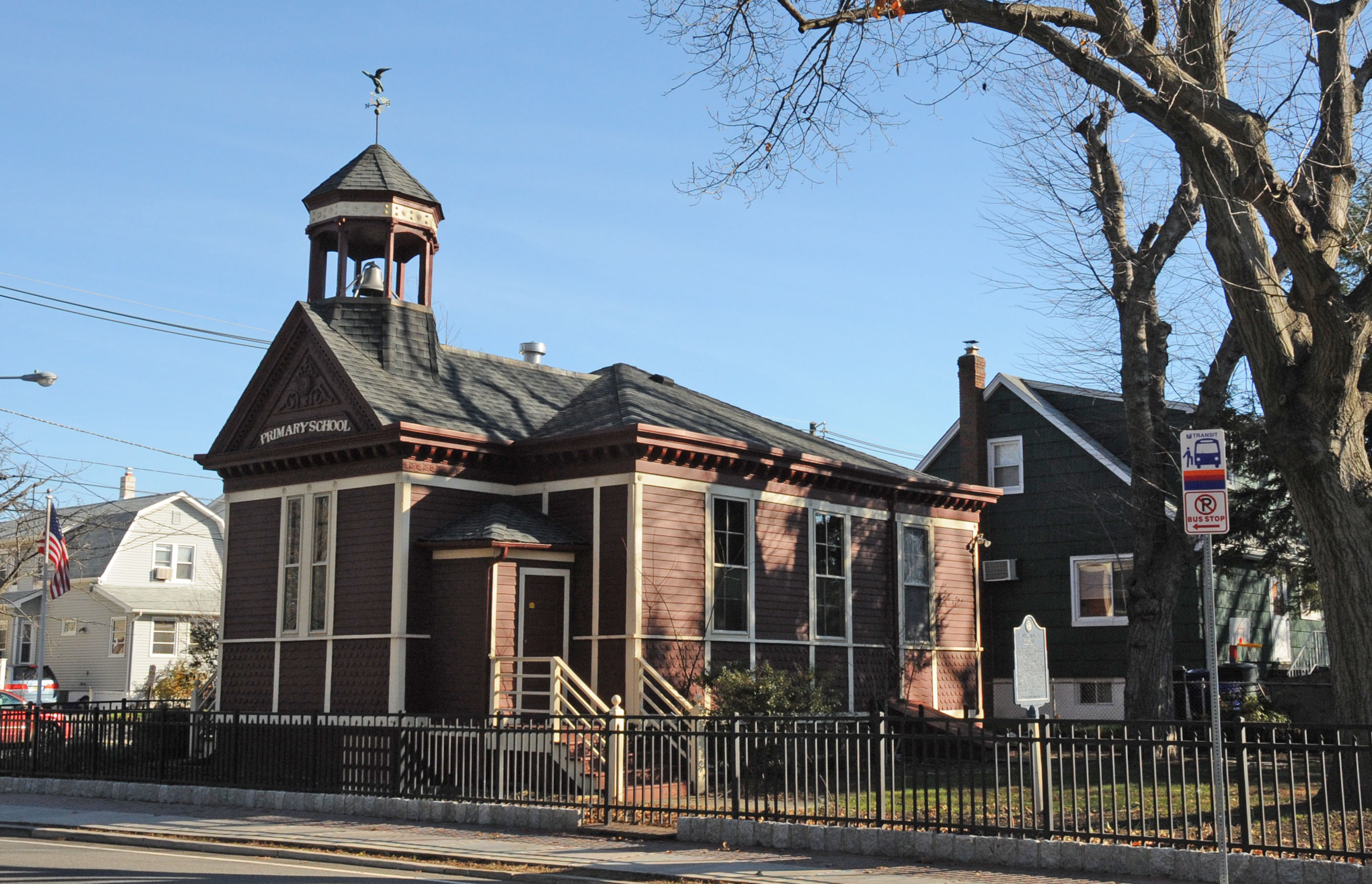
- Historic River Road School

- Seal
- Nickname: "Bear Country"
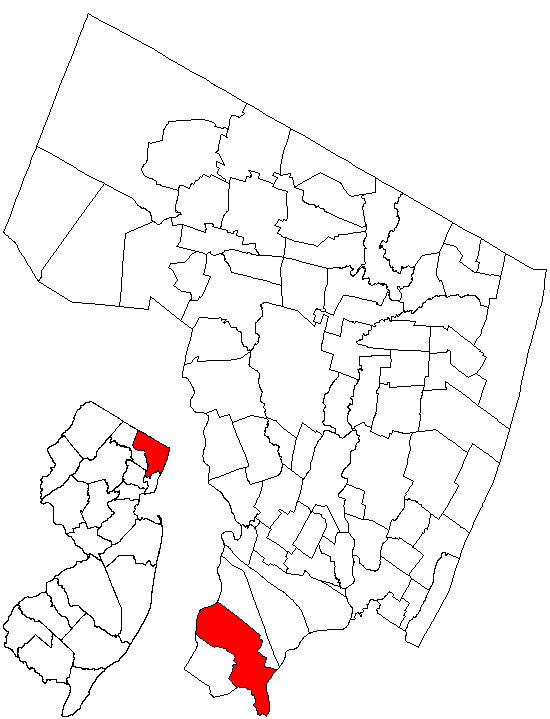
- Location of Lyndhurst in Bergen County highlighted in red (right). Inset map: Location of Bergen County in New Jersey highlighted in red (left).

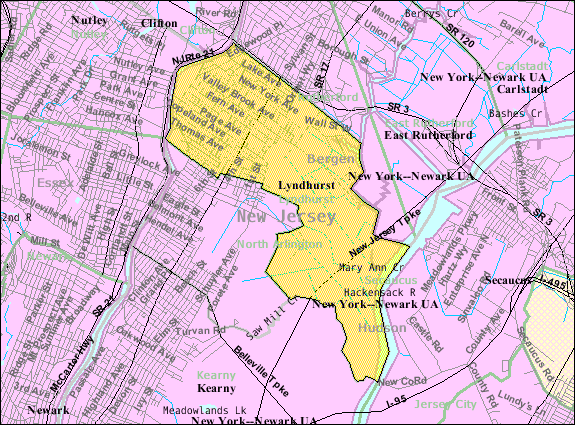
- Census Bureau map of Lyndhurst, New Jersey

- Location in Bergen County Location in New Jersey Location in the United States
- Coordinates: 40.797985°N 74.113258°W
- Country: United States
- State: New Jersey
- County: Bergen
- Incorporated: February 19, 1852 (as Union Township)
- Renamed: May 15, 1917 (as Lyndhurst)
- Named for: Lord Lyndhurst

Government
  - Type: Walsh Act
  - Body: Township Committee
  - Mayor: Robert B. Giangeruso (term ends May 20, 2025)
  - Municipal clerk: Angela White

Area
  - Total: 4.97 sq mi (12.86 km^{2})
  - Land: 4.58 sq mi (11.87 km^{2})
  - Water: 0.38 sq mi (0.99 km^{2}) 7.66%
  - Rank: 276th of 565 in state 13th of 70 in county
- Elevation: 10 ft (3.0 m)

Population (2020)
  - Total: 22,519
  - Estimate (2024): 22,642
  - Rank: 121st of 565 in state 13th of 70 in county
  - Density: 4,912.5/sq mi (1,896.7/km^{2})
  - Rank: 117th of 565 in state 31st of 70 in county
- Time zone: UTC−05:00 (Eastern (EST))
  - Summer (DST): UTC−04:00 (Eastern (EDT))
- ZIP Code: 07071
- Area code: 201
- FIPS code: 3400342090
- GNIS feature ID: 0882225
- Website: www.lyndhurstnj.org

Lyndhurst is a township in Bergen County, in the U.S. state of New Jersey. As of the 2020 United States census, the township's population was 22,519, an increase of 1,965 (+9.6%) from the 2010 census count of 20,554, which in turn reflected an increase of 1,171 (+6.0%) from the 19,383 counted in the 2000 census.

== History ==
On February 22, 1840, Hudson County was formed by an Act of the New Jersey Legislature. The newly created county was created from territories that had been Bergen Township since 1691, as well as and from the southern portion of Lodi Township. The portion of Lodi Township taken at this time formed the new Harrison Township in Hudson County. The border between the newly created Harrison Township in Hudson County and the portion of Lodi Township remaining in Bergen County was the New Barbadoes Turnpike, which is now called Paterson Plank Road. Some of the residents of the northern portion of Harrison Township requested to be returned to Bergen County. On February 19, 1852, this area—which had been part of Lodi Township—was returned to Bergen County to become the newly formed Union Township.

On September 21, 1881, Rutherford became the first borough to be formed under the terms of the New Jersey Legislature's Borough Act of 1878, based on a referendum of voters that passed the previous day. Rutherford Borough was fully separated from the township form of government in 1890 and acquired an additional portion of Union Township in that year. On April 17, 1889, Boiling Springs Township was created from the northern portion of Union Township. This township was dissolved with the creation of the coterminous Borough of East Rutherford as of March 28, 1894. The borough of North Arlington was created as of March 11, 1896, as the result of a referendum that took place two days earlier. Finally, on March 27, 1917, the residents of the remaining portions of Union Township passed a referendum to change the name to Lyndhurst Township, which became effective as of May 15, 1917. The township is named for Lord Lyndhurst.

Kingsland is a former post village within the township. The Kingsland family possessed a large tract of land in the area known as Kingsland Manor. In 1872, the Delaware, Lackawanna and Western Railroad established a railway through the township, and erected a depot in the area named "Kingsland" in honor of the family. A railroad shop was built, and houses erected for the railroad employees. Church services were held in the train depot.

=== Kingsland explosion ===
On January 11, 1917, a fire started in Building 30 of the Canadian Car and Foundry Company, in what is now Lyndhurst, in a plant that was producing munitions for sale to the United Kingdom and the Russian Empire during World War I. After a spill of flammable liquid started a fire in a building where shells were cleaned, about 500,000, three-inch (76 mm) explosive shells were discharged in about four hours, destroying the entire facility. It was said to have been a spectacle more magnificent than the explosion at Black Tom in Jersey City, New Jersey.

Tessie McNamara, who operated the company switchboard, was credited with saving 1,400 lives, contacting each of the buildings and shouting the warning, "Get out or go up!" Thanks to her dedication, no one was killed in the fire. The Lyndhurst Historical Society has created a vest pocket park dedicated to the memory of McNamara. The park is located on Clay Avenue, between Valley Brook Avenue and Wall Street West. The brick stack can be seen from this park.

== Geography ==
According to the United States Census Bureau, the township had a total area of 4.96 square miles (12.86 km^{2}), including 4.58 square miles (11.87 km^{2}) of land and 0.38 square miles (0.99 km^{2}) of water (7.66%).

Unincorporated communities, localities and place names located partially or completely within the township include Kingsland and South Rutherford.

The township borders North Arlington and Rutherford in Bergen County; Belleville and Nutley in Essex County; Kearny and Secaucus in Hudson County; and Clifton in Passaic County.

The Passaic River, crossed by the Avondale Bridge and the Lyndhurst Draw, creates the municipal and county border at the west. The eastern portion of the municipality is part of the uninhabited wetlands in the New Jersey Meadowlands.

== Demographics ==
Historical population
Census	Pop.	Note	%±
1860	957		—
1870	2,057		114.9%
1880	3,164		53.8%
1890	1,560	*	−50.7%
1900	1,590	*	1.9%
1910	4,076		156.4%
1920	9,515		133.4%
1930	17,362		82.5%
1940	17,454		0.5%
1950	19,980		14.5%
1960	21,867		9.4%
1970	22,729		3.9%
1980	20,326		−10.6%
1990	18,262		−10.2%
2000	19,383		6.1%
2010	20,554		6.0%
2020	22,519		9.6%
2024 (est.)	22,642		0.5%
Population sources: 1860–1920; 1860–1870 1870 1880–1890; 1890–1910 1910–1930; 1900–2020 2000; 2010 2020 * = Lost territory in previous decade.

=== 2020 census ===
Lyndhurst township, Bergen County, New Jersey – Racial and ethnic composition Note: the US Census treats Hispanic/Latino as an ethnic category. This table excludes Latinos from the racial categories and assigns them to a separate category. Hispanics/Latinos may be of any race.
Race / Ethnicity (NH = Non-Hispanic)	Pop 2000	Pop 2010	Pop 2020	% 2000	% 2010	% 2020
White alone (NH)	16,166	14,709	13,388	83.40%	71.56%	59.45%
Black or African American alone (NH)	98	325	688	0.51%	1.58%	3.06%
Native American or Alaska Native alone (NH)	7	10	9	0.04%	0.05%	0.04%
Asian alone (NH)	1,042	1,333	1,587	5.38%	6.49%	7.05%
Native Hawaiian or Pacific Islander alone (NH)	1	6	0	0.01%	0.03%	0.00%
Other race alone (NH)	43	116	223	0.22%	0.56%	0.99%
Mixed race or Multiracial (NH)	282	286	543	1.45%	1.39%	2.41%
Hispanic or Latino (any race)	1,744	3,769	6,081	9.00%	18.34%	27.00%
Total	19,383	20,554	22,519	100.00%	100.00%	100.00%

=== 2010 census ===
The 2010 United States census counted 20,554 people, 8,337 households, and 5,394 families in the township. The population density was 4,509.3 per square mile (1,741.1/km^{2}). There were 8,787 housing units at an average density of 1,927.7 per square mile (744.3/km^{2}). The racial makeup was 82.97% (17,053) White, 1.98% (406) Black or African American, 0.17% (34) Native American, 6.59% (1,355) Asian, 0.03% (6) Pacific Islander, 5.57% (1,144) from other races, and 2.71% (556) from two or more races. Hispanic or Latino of any race were 18.34% (3,769) of the population.

Of the 8,337 households, 25.5% had children under the age of 18; 47.9% were married couples living together; 12.0% had a female householder with no husband present and 35.3% were non-families. Of all households, 28.7% were made up of individuals and 10.8% had someone living alone who was 65 years of age or older. The average household size was 2.46 and the average family size was 3.07.

18.9% of the population were under the age of 18, 7.8% from 18 to 24, 30.2% from 25 to 44, 27.5% from 45 to 64, and 15.7% who were 65 years of age or older. The median age was 40.3 years. For every 100 females, the population had 92.6 males. For every 100 females ages 18 and older there were 90.4 males.

The Census Bureau's 2006–2010 American Community Survey showed that (in 2010 inflation-adjusted dollars) median household income was $68,177 (with a margin of error of +/− $6,370) and the median family income was $79,579 (+/− $4,878). Males had a median income of $56,299 (+/− $6,347) versus $44,468 (+/− $2,406) for females. The per capita income for the township was $34,233 (+/− $2,119). About 3.8% of families and 4.6% of the population were below the poverty line, including 6.6% of those under age 18 and 6.7% of those age 65 or over.

Same-sex couples headed 58 households in 2010, an increase from the 35 counted in 2000.

=== 2000 census ===
As of the 2000 United States census there were 19,383 people, 7,877 households, and 5,206 families residing in the township. The population density was 4,169.7 inhabitants per square mile (1,609.9/km^{2}). There were 8,103 housing units at an average density of 1,743.1 per square mile (673.0/km^{2}). The racial makeup of the township was 89.94% White, 9.0% Hispanic or Latino, 5.40% Asian, 0.61% African American, 0.05% Native American, 0.01% Pacific Islander, 1.95% from two or more races, and 2.05% from other races.

As of the 2000 Census, 33.8% of township residents were of Italian ancestry, the 19th-highest percentage of any municipality in the United States, and eighth-highest in New Jersey, among all places with more than 1,000 residents identifying their ancestry.

There were 7,877 households, out of which 25.8% had children under the age of 18 living with them, 51.1% were married couples living together, 11.2% had a female householder with no husband present, and 33.9% were non-families. 28.8% of all households were made up of individuals, and 12.6% had someone living alone who was 65 years of age or older. The average household size was 2.46 and the average family size was 3.06.

In the township, the age distribution of the population shows 19.1% under the age of 18, 7.6% from 18 to 24, 32.4% from 25 to 44, 23.1% from 45 to 64, and 17.7% who were 65 years of age or older. The median age was 40 years. For every 100 females, there were 91.1 males. For every 100 females age 18 and over, there were 88.2 males. Lyndhurst has the highest proportion of single females ages 18–25.

The median income for a household in the township was $53,375, and the median income for a family was $63,758. Males had a median income of $42,359 versus $35,429 for females. The per capita income for the township was $25,940. About 2.8% of families and 4.6% of the population were below the poverty line, including 4.2% of those under age 18 and 7.6% of those aged 65 or over.

== Economy ==
Lyndhurst was historically home to manufacturers of machinery and metal products.

Lyndhurst was home to locally owned and operated businesses such as Mazur's Bakery, which closed in 2013.

Because portions of the township are located in the New Jersey Meadowlands, a number of radio stations have their transmitters and towers located in Lyndhurst. These include AM stations WINS-1010, WSNR-620, and WLIB-1190 along with Amateur Radio and HD TV station W2INS.

Lyndhurst Meadowlands is home to one of nine Medieval Times dinner theaters nationwide.

Lyndhurst, together with North Arlington and Rutherford, was the site of the EnCap project, an effort to remediate landfills on the 785-acre (3.18 km^{2}) site and construct homes and golf courses on top of the cleaned-up site. On May 27, 2008, the New Jersey Meadowlands Commission terminated its agreement with EnCap Golf Holdings, the company that had the contract to redevelop the site, after the company had missed targets to clean up the landfills as part of the project.

At one time LJN Toys had its headquarters in Lyndhurst.

From 1946 until 1966, Lyndhurst was home to the BUR Barbell Company, the second-largest producer of weight training equipment in the United States.

== Arts and culture ==
Musical groups from the township include the funeral doom metal band Evoken and the alternative rock band Winter Hours.

== Sports ==
Town mascot and names include the Lyndhurst Golden Bears/Lyndhurst Post 139/Lyndhurst Cubs

=== Lyndhurst baseball ===
American Legion, Cricket, Stellatos, Savinos, I.A.C.L, Bergen County Glass, Carucci, and Century 21 make up Lyndhurst Little League as of 2017.

On July 14, 2006, the Lyndhurst-American Little League baseball team ended their 17-year drought to become district champs. Throughout the nine district playoff games, Lyndhurst-American hit 14 home runs and eventually emerged as sectional finalists; two wins away from appearing on national television.

=== Lyndhurst Youth Soccer ===
Lyndhurst Youth Soccer has approximately 600 players from age 5 to age 13 and several travel teams.

== Parks and recreation ==
Riverside County Park is a Bergen County park covering 85 acres (34 ha) located on Riverside Avenue between Lyndhurst and North Arlington. It has a playground, athletic fields, tennis courts, a Bocce ball court, and a fitness center.

The township named Lewandowski Park and Lewandowski Street in honor of the three Lewandowski brothers, who were killed while serving in the armed forces during World War II.

== Government ==
=== Local government ===
The Township of Lyndhurst has been governed under the Walsh Act form of New Jersey municipal government since 1913. The township is one of 30 municipalities (of the 564) statewide that use the commission form of government. The governing body is comprised of five commissioners, who are elected concurrently at-large on a non-partisan basis to four-year terms of office as part of the May municipal election. At a reorganization meeting held after each election each of the five members is assigned a department to oversee and the commissioners select a mayor from among its five members.

As of 2023, members of the Township Committee are Mayor Robert B. Giangeruso (Commissioner of Public Safety), Louis DeMarco (Commissioner of Revenue and Finance), Karen Haggerty (Commissioner of Public Affairs), Richard L. Jarvis Sr. (Commissioner of Public Works) and John J. Montillo Jr. (Commissioner of Parks and Public Property), all of whom are serving concurrent terms of office that end on May 18, 2025.

=== Federal, state and county representation ===
Lyndhurst is located in the 9th Congressional District and is part of New Jersey's 36th state legislative district.

For the 119th United States Congress, New Jersey's 9th congressional district is represented by Nellie Pou (D, North Haledon) New Jersey is represented in the United States Senate by Democrats Cory Booker (Newark, term ends 2027) and Andy Kim (Moorestown, term ends 2031).

For the 2026–2027 session, the 36th legislative district of the New Jersey Legislature is represented in the State Senate by Paul Sarlo (D, Wood-Ridge) and in the General Assembly by Clinton Calabrese (D, Cliffside Park) and Gary Schaer (D, Passaic).

Bergen County is governed by a directly elected County Executive, with legislative functions performed by a Board of County Commissioners comprised of seven members who are elected at-large to three-year terms in partisan elections on a staggered basis, with either two or three seats coming up for election each November; a Chairman and Vice Chairman are selected from among its seven members at a reorganization meeting held every January. As of 2025, the county executive is James J. Tedesco III (D, Paramus), whose four-year term of office ends December 31, 2026.

Bergen County's Commissioners are Chair Mary J. Amoroso (D, Mahwah, 2025), Vice Chair Steven A. Tanelli (D, North Arlington, 2027), Chair Pro Tem Joan Voss (D, Fort Lee, 2026), Rafael Marte (D, Bergenfield, 2026), Germaine M. Ortiz (D, Emerson, 2025), Thomas J. Sullivan Jr. (D, Montvale, 2025) and Tracy Silna Zur (D, Franklin Lakes, 2027).

Bergen County's elected constitutional officials are Clerk John S. Hogan (D, Northvale, 2026), Sheriff Anthony Cureton (D, Englewood, 2027) and Surrogate Michael R. Dressler (D, Cresskill, 2026).

=== Politics ===
As of March 2011, there were a total of 11,595 registered voters in Lyndhurst Township, of which 3,237 (27.9% vs. 31.7% countywide) were registered as Democrats, 2,308 (19.9% vs. 21.1%) were registered as Republicans and 6,044 (52.1% vs. 47.1%) were registered as Unaffiliated. There were 6 voters registered as Libertarians or Greens. Among the township's 2010 Census population, 56.4% (vs. 57.1% in Bergen County) were registered to vote, including 69.6% of those ages 18 and over (vs. 73.7% countywide).

Gubernatorial election results for Lyndhurst
Year	Republican		Democratic		Third party(ies)	
Year	No.	%	No.	%	No.	%
2025	3,918	50.69%	3,767	48.73%	45	0.58%
2021	3,523	56.90%	2,635	42.55%	34	0.55%
2017	1,946	44.91%	2,283	52.69%	104	2.40%
2013	2,949	60.36%	1,876	38.40%	61	1.25%
2009	2,628	49.13%	2,389	44.66%	332	6.21%
2005	2,064	39.95%	2,949	57.07%	154	2.98%

In the 2016 presidential election, Republican Donald Trump received 4,818 votes (51.3% vs. 41.1% countywide), ahead of Democrat Hillary Clinton with 4,229 votes (45.1% vs. 54.2%) and other candidates with 337 votes (4.5% vs. 4.6%), among the 9,501 ballots cast by the borough's 13,215 registered voters, for a turnout of 71.9% (vs. 72.5% in Bergen County). In the 2012 presidential election, Democrat Barack Obama received 4,689 votes (55.8% vs. 54.8% countywide), ahead of Republican Mitt Romney with 3,536 votes (42.1% vs. 43.5%) and other candidates with 113 votes (1.3% vs. 0.9%), among the 8,409 ballots cast by the township's 12,126 registered voters, for a turnout of 69.3% (vs. 70.4% in Bergen County). In the 2008 presidential election, Republican John McCain received 4,531 votes (49.6% vs. 44.5% countywide), ahead of Democrat Barack Obama with 4,434 votes (48.6% vs. 53.9%) and other candidates with 80 votes (0.9% vs. 0.8%), among the 9,131 ballots cast by the township's 12,250 registered voters, for a turnout of 74.5% (vs. 76.8% in Bergen County).

Presidential elections results
Year	Republican	Democratic
2024	56.4% 5,786	41.3% 4,235
2020	49.5% 5,530	48.9% 5,462
2016	51.3% 4,818	45.1% 4,229
2012	42.1% 3,536	55.8% 4,689
2008	49.6% 4,531	48.6% 4,434
2004	50.5% 4,643	48.3% 4,163

In the 2013 gubernatorial election, Republican Chris Christie received 60.4% of the vote (2,949 cast), ahead of Democrat Barbara Buono with 38.4% (1,876 votes), and other candidates with 1.2% (61 votes), among the 5,012 ballots cast by the township's 11,693 registered voters (126 ballots were spoiled), for a turnout of 42.9%. In the 2009 gubernatorial election, Republican Chris Christie received 2,628 votes (48.9% vs. 45.8% countywide), ahead of Democrat Jon Corzine with 2,389 votes (44.5% vs. 48.0%), Independent Chris Daggett with 303 votes (5.6% vs. 4.7%) and other candidates with 29 votes (0.5% vs. 0.5%), among the 5,374 ballots cast by the township's 11,916 registered voters, yielding a 45.1% turnout (vs. 50.0% in the county).

United States Senate election results for Lyndhurst1
Year	Republican		Democratic		Third party(ies)	
Year	No.	%	No.	%	No.	%
2024	4,961	52.92%	4,136	44.12%	277	2.95%
2018	3,227	48.29%	3,247	48.59%	209	3.13%
2012	2,954	39.97%	4,256	57.59%	180	2.44%
2006	2,159	45.08%	2,556	53.37%	74	1.55%

United States Senate election results for Lyndhurst2
Year	Republican		Democratic		Third party(ies)	
Year	No.	%	No.	%	No.	%
2020	4,983	46.73%	5,434	50.96%	247	2.32%
2014	1,620	41.22%	2,224	56.59%	86	2.19%
2013	1,325	49.57%	1,316	49.23%	32	1.20%
2008	3,567	44.95%	4,246	53.51%	122	1.54%

== Education ==
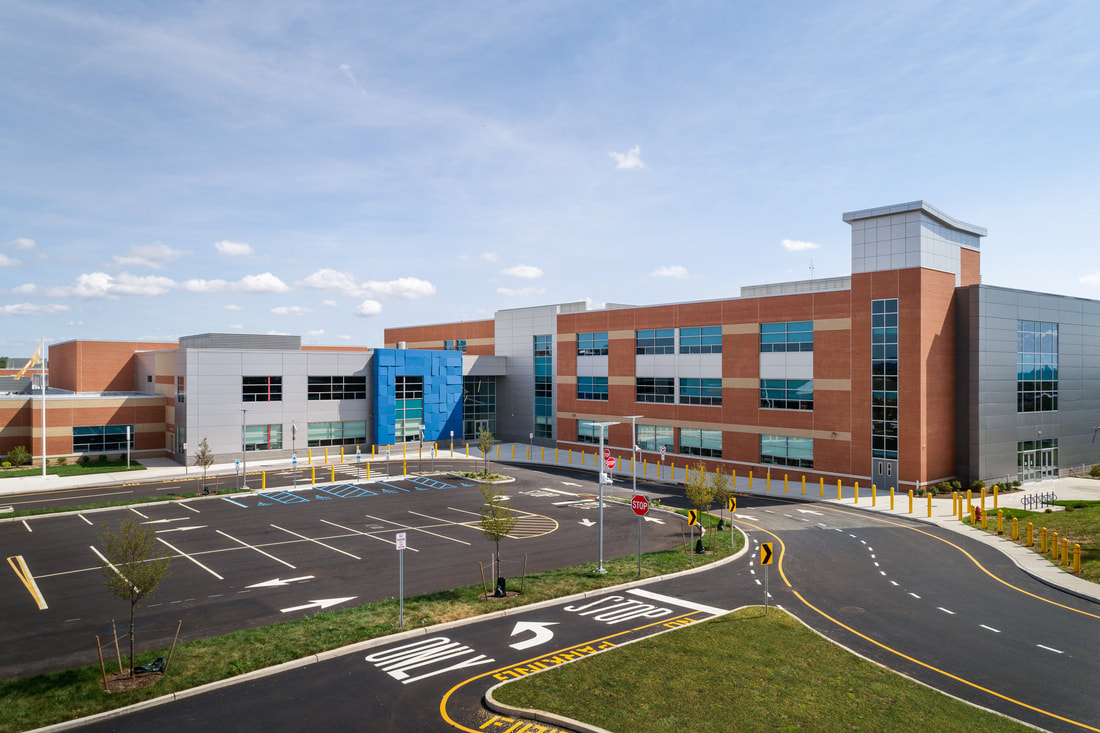
Lyndhurst Middle School

The Lyndhurst School District serves students in pre-kindergarten through twelfth grade. As of the 2021–22 school year, the district, comprised of nine schools, had an enrollment of 2,540 students and 197.5 classroom teachers (on an FTE basis), for a student–teacher ratio of 12.9:1. Schools in the district (with 2021–22 enrollment data from the National Center for Education Statistics) are Community School with 156 students in grades K-2, Columbus School with 104 students in grades K-2, Franklin School with 177 students in grades K-2, Memorial Campus with 72 students in grades K-2, Washington School with 157 students in grades K-2, Jefferson School with 233 students in grades 3-5, Roosevelt School with 306 students in grades 3-5, Lyndhurst Middle School with 616 students in grades 6-8 and Lyndhurst High School with 789 students in grades 9-12.

Public school students from the borough, and all of Bergen County, are eligible to attend the secondary education programs offered by the Bergen County Technical Schools, which include the Bergen County Academies in Hackensack, and the Bergen Tech campus in Teterboro or Paramus. The district offers programs on a shared-time or full-time basis, with admission based on a selective application process and tuition covered by the student's home school district.

Founded in 1956, Sacred Heart School is a Catholic elementary school serving students in grades K–8 that operates under the auspices of the Roman Catholic Archdiocese of Newark.

Bergen Community College has a campus in Lyndhurst. Nearby colleges and universities include Fairleigh Dickinson University (Teaneck / Hackensack campus) and Felician College in Lodi and Rutherford.

== Emergency services ==
=== Police ===
The Lyndhurst Police Department (LPD) provides emergency and protective services to the township of Lyndhurst and is led by Chief Richard Jarvis. The LPD was established on January 1, 1907, under the laws of Union Township. The department has lost four officers in the line of duty; which is higher than any other municipality in Bergen County.

A Police Auxiliary Unit falls under the Police Department and the Office of Emergency Management. Lyndhurst Police Auxiliary is headed by Deputy Chief Wayne Alexander. The Police Auxiliary members augment the services of the Police Department, with participants required to dedicate at least 16 hours a month for patrols on weekends, evenings and at township events and functions.

=== Fire ===
The Lyndhurst Fire Department (LFD) is an all-volunteer fire department. The LFD was organized in February 1886. The department is staffed by 70 fully trained firefighters and responds to an average of 600 calls per year.

=== Ambulance ===
The township of Lyndhurst runs both a volunteer and a paid ambulance service. Residents can use the Lyndhurst Police Emergency Squad for emergency services. The volunteers respond to medical calls from 6 pm to 6 am Monday through Friday and on a 24-hour basis on weekends, while the paid division is staffed from 6 am to 6 pm during the week. Residents do not pay for the services provided.

== Transportation ==
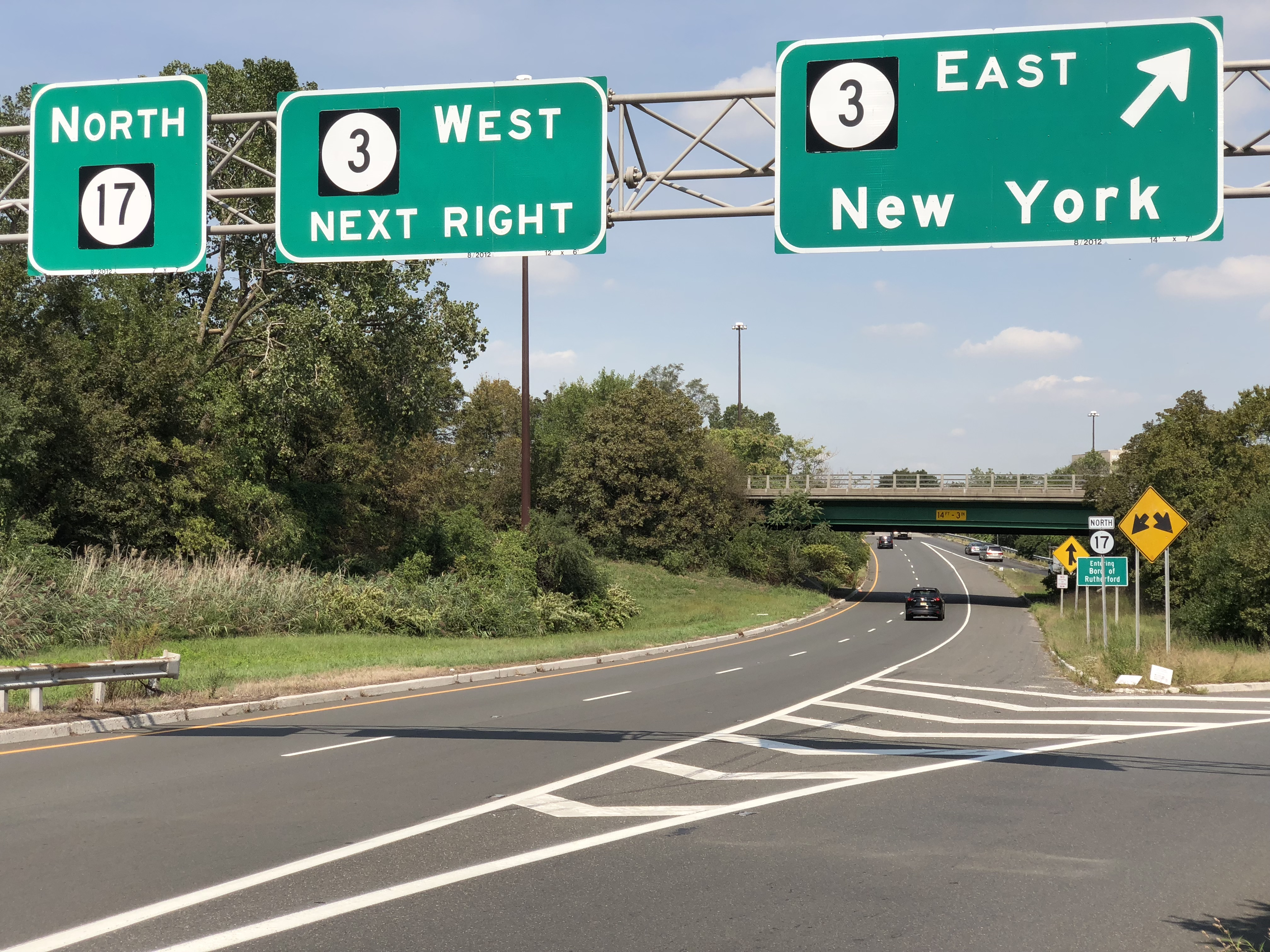
Route 17 northbound exiting Lyndhurst

=== Roads and highways ===
As of May 2010, the township had a total of 45.95 miles (73.95 km) of roadways, of which 37.81 miles (60.85 km) were maintained by the municipality, 4.93 miles (7.93 km) by Bergen County and 2.15 miles (3.46 km) by the New Jersey Department of Transportation and 1.06 miles (1.71 km) by the New Jersey Turnpike Authority.

Route 17 and County Route 507 pass through Lyndhurst. Route 3 is just over the northern border of Lyndhurst in neighboring Rutherford. Route 21 is across the Passaic River in neighboring Nutley and Clifton.

The New Jersey Turnpike Western Spur (Interstate 95) passes through the southeastern part, but the closest interchanges are in East Rutherford (Exit 16W) and Kearny (Exit 15W).

The Avondale-DeJessa Bridge, which connects Lyndhurst and Nutley over the Passaic River with one lane in each direction, carries more than 26,000 vehicles a day, and is among 22 bridges in Bergen County that have been classified as "structurally deficient".

=== Public transportation ===
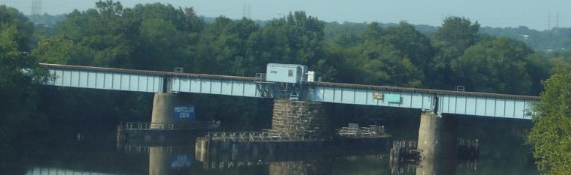
The Lyndhurst Draw crosses the Passaic River carrying the NJT Main Line and Metro North Port Jervis Line.

NJ Transit serves the township at Lyndhurst station along the Main Line. The Main Line had included a station at Kingsland that was closed in 2025 following the completion of a renovation at Lyndhurst Station.

Lyndhurst Station offers service to Hoboken Terminal, with transfers available at Secaucus Junction to New York Penn Station, Newark Penn Station, and Newark Airport, with transfers at Hoboken to PATH trains, Hudson Bergen Light Rail, and New York Waterway ferries. It also offers service to Suffern, New York, the northern terminus of the Main Line; transfers are available there for the Port Jervis Line, which is run by Metro-North Railroad.

The trains travel over the Lyndhurst Draw, a railroad bridge crossing the Passaic River between Clifton and Lyndhurst that was constructed in 1901 and is owned and operated by NJ Transit Rail Operations.

New Jersey Transit offers buses serving Newark on the 76 route and to the Port Authority Bus Terminal in Midtown Manhattan on the 109, 191, 192, 193 and 195 routes.

== Notable people ==
People who were born in, residents of, or otherwise closely associated with Lyndhurst include:

- Gabriel M. Ambrosio (1938–2013), politician who served in the New Jersey Senate, representing the 36th Legislative District
- Michael Bell (born 1971), artist known for his infamous portrait clientele, which includes the late John Gotti and numerous actors from The Sopranos
- George Fraser Black (1866–1948), librarian, historian and linguist who worked at the New York Public Library for more than three decades
- Jim Blumenstock (1918–1963), American football fullback who played in the NFL for the New York Giants
- Anthony J. Cirone (born 1941), percussionist with the San Francisco Symphony under Maestro Josef Krips
- Victor Cruz (born 1986), wide receiver who has played for the New York Giants
- Christine Ann Denny (class of 2001), neuroscientist whose research focuses on the molecular mechanisms underlying learning and memory
- Melissa Fumero (born 1982), actress who has appeared in One Life to Live and Brooklyn Nine-Nine
- Mackenzie Gress (born 2004), soccer player who plays as a goalkeeper for the Penn State Nittany Lions
- Alan Grieco (born 1946), former cyclist who competed in the Men's sprint at the 1964 Summer Olympics
- Wayne Johnsen (born 1977), professional boxer who appeared on the reality television series The Contender 3
- Alexia Jorge (born 2003), professional baseball catcher for the San Francisco Firebells of the Women's Pro Baseball League
- Elizabeth Lindsay (1912–2013), track and field athlete and Girl Scout activist
- Tom Longo (1942–2015), defensive back who played three seasons in the National Football League with the New York Giants and St. Louis Cardinals
- Roy LoPresti (1929–2002), aeronautical engineer
- Lou Monte (1917–1989), singer best known for a number of best-selling, Italian-themed novelty records which he recorded in the late 1950s and early 1960s
- Robert O'Brien (1908–1987), racing driver
- Donny Pritzlaff (born 1979), freestyle wrestler who represented the United States in international competition, winning bronze medals at the 2006 World Wrestling Championships and at the 2007 FILA Wrestling World Cup
- Lawrence G. Rawl (1928–2005), chairman and CEO of Exxon from 1985 to 1993
- Chico Resch (born 1948), hockey sportscaster who played goalie in the NHL for the New York Islanders, Colorado Rockies, New Jersey Devils and Philadelphia Flyers
- Robert A. Roe (1924–2014), politician who represented New Jersey in the United States House of Representatives from 1969 to 1993
- Carmine Savino (1911–1993), lawyer, newspaper editor and politician who served for ten years in the New Jersey General Assembly
- Anthony Scardino (born 1936), politician who served as Mayor of Lyndhurst and served in the New Jersey Senate from the 36th Legislative District from 1974 to 1980
- Walter G. Schroeder (born 1927), politician who was a member of the Oregon House of Representatives from 1985 to 1993
- John P. Scott (1933–2010), member of the New Jersey Senate from 1992 to 1998
- Jimmy Smagula (born 1976), actor who has appeared in The Sopranos, Bones, Grey's Anatomy, Parks and Recreation, and Rizzoli & Isles as well as films, including The Island and The Producers
- Jim Tooey (born 1954), actor
- Johnny Weir (born 1984), figure skater

== Historic sites ==
Lyndhurst is home to the following locations on the National Register of Historic Places:

- River Road School – 400 Riverside Avenue (added 1977)
- Jacob W. Van Winkle House – 316 Riverside Avenue (added 1983)
- Jeremiah J. Yeareance House – 410 Riverside Avenue (added 1986)

== Sister cities ==
- Kukës, Albania

== Television ==
Lyndhurst has made several appearances on the hit TV series The Sopranos.

== Sources ==
- Municipal Incorporations of the State of New Jersey (according to Counties) prepared by the Division of Local Government, Department of the Treasury (New Jersey); December 1, 1958.
- Clayton, W. Woodford; and Nelson, William. History of Bergen and Passaic Counties, New Jersey, with Biographical Sketches of Many of its Pioneers and Prominent Men. Philadelphia: Everts and Peck, 1882.
- Harvey, Cornelius Burnham (ed.), Genealogical History of Hudson and Bergen Counties, New Jersey. New York: New Jersey Genealogical Publishing Co., 1900.
- Van Valen, James M. History of Bergen County, New Jersey. New York: New Jersey Publishing and Engraving Co., 1900.
- Westervelt, Frances A. (Frances Augusta), 1858–1942, History of Bergen County, New Jersey, 1630–1923, Lewis Historical Publishing Company, 1923.
