= Pierce H. Deamer Jr. =

American politician (1907–1986)

Member of the New Jersey State Senate from Bergen County
- In office 1962–1966
- Preceded by: Walter H. Jones
- Succeeded by: Matthew Feldman

Member of the New Jersey General Assembly from Bergen County
- In office 1952–1962

Personal details
- Born: Pierce H. Deamer, Jr. April 24, 1907 New York City
- Died: June 12, 1986 (aged 79)
- Party: Republican
- Spouse: Agnes M. Churchill
- Education: New Jersey Law School

Pierce H. Deamer Jr. (April 24, 1907 – June 12, 1986) was an American Republican Party politician who served in both houses of the New Jersey Legislature, serving in the New Jersey General Assembly from 1952 to 1962 and then in the New Jersey Senate until 1966.

== Early life ==
Deamer was born on April 24, 1907, in New York City, the son of Pierce H. Deamer and Adelaide Bernhardt Deamer. His father was a national labor organizer and served as Vice President of the Upholsterers International Union. He moved to Bergenfield, New Jersey, in his youth and graduated from Tenafly High School and the New Jersey Law School (now Rutgers School of Law–Newark). He maintained law offices in Bergenfield, where he served as the Bergenfield Municipal Judge and as Chairman of the Bergenfield Civil Defense. He was Municipal Attorney for Bergenfield and New Milford. He was counsel to the Bergen County Sheriff from 1948 to 1951.

== New Jersey General Assembly ==
He was elected to the New Jersey General Assembly in 1951, and was re-elected in 1953, 1955, 1957 and 1959.

== New Jersey State Senate ==
He was elected to the New Jersey Senate in 1961, defeating Paramus Mayor Fred C. Galda 160,125 (55.8%) to 124,492 (43.4%).

The U.S. Supreme Court, in Reynolds v. Sims (more commonly known as One Man, One Vote), required redistricting by state legislatures for congressional districts to keep represented populations equal, as well as requiring both houses of state legislatures to have districts drawn that contained roughly equal populations, and to perform redistricting when needed. Because of its population, Bergen County gained three Senate seats.

A deep split among Bergen County Republicans intensified in 1963 when Deamer and former State Senator Walter H. Jones faced off in an election for Bergen County Republican Chairman. Jones won, and by 1965, Deamer found himself dumped from the Bergen County Republican Organization line. Jones backed Assembly Speaker Marion West Higgins, Assemblyman Peter Moraites, and former Assemblymen Nelson G. Gross and Arthur Vervaet. Deamer ran on an insurgent ticket with Assemblymen Richard Vander Plaat and Harry Randall, Jr., and former Assemblyman Carmine Savino. Jones' slate won decisively.

== 1965 Republican primary for State Senator - Bergen County ==
Candidate	Office	Votes
Marion West Higgins	Incumbent Assembly Speaker	33,769
Peter Moraites	Incumbent Assemblyman	32,214
Nelson G. Gross	Former Assemblyman	31,220
Arthur Vervaet	Former Assemblyman	30,759
Pierce H. Deamer Jr.	Incumbent State Senator	20,240
Richard Vander Plaat	Incumbent Assemblyman	20,211
Harry Randall Jr.	Incumbent Assemblyman	17,971
John J. Breen	Attorney	3,195

== Family and death ==
He married Agnes M. Churchill of Teaneck on January 4, 1939, and had four children. Deamer died on June 12, 1986, in Bergenfield.
