= Lyndhurst School District =

School district in Bergen County, New Jersey, US

Address
- 420 Fern Avenue Lyndhurst, Bergen County, New Jersey, 07071; United States
- Coordinates: 40.81001°N 74.125582°W

District information
- Grades: PreK-12
- Superintendent: Joseph DeCorso
- Business administrator: James Hyman
- Schools: 9

Students and staff
- Enrollment: 2,540 (as of 2021–22)
- Faculty: 197.5 FTEs
- Student–teacher ratio: 12.9:1

Other information
- District Factor Group: DE
- Website: www.lyndhurstschools.net
Ind.	Per pupil	District spending	Rank (*)	K-12 average	%± vs. average
1A	Total Spending	$17,673	30	$18,891	−6.4%
1	Budgetary Cost	13,241	24	14,783	−10.4%
2	Classroom Instruction	7,691	19	8,763	−12.2%
6	Support Services	1,835	15	2,392	−23.3%
8	Administrative Cost	1,726	55	1,485	16.2%
10	Operations & Maintenance	1,401	17	1,783	−21.4%
13	Extracurricular Activities	368	29	268	37.3%
16	Median Teacher Salary	59,000	18	64,043
Data from NJDoE 2014 Taxpayers' Guide to Education Spending. *Of K-12 districts with 1,800-3,500 students. Lowest spending=1; Highest=68

The Lyndhurst School District is a comprehensive community public school district that serves students in pre-kindergarten through twelfth grade from Lyndhurst, in Bergen County, in the U.S. state of New Jersey.

As of the 2021–22 school year, the district, comprising nine schools, had an enrollment of 2,540 students and 197.5 classroom teachers (on an FTE basis), for a student–teacher ratio of 12.9:1.

The district is classified by the New Jersey Department of Education as being in District Factor Group "DE", the fifth-highest of eight groupings. District Factor Groups organize districts statewide to allow comparison by common socioeconomic characteristics of the local districts. From lowest socioeconomic status to highest, the categories are A, B, CD, DE, FG, GH, I and J.

== Schools ==
Schools in the district (with 2021–22 enrollment data from the National Center for Education Statistics) are:

Preschool

- Community School with 156 students in grades K-2
  - Michael Rizzo, principal

Elementary schools

- Columbus School with 104 students in grades K-2
  - Robert Giangeruso, principal
- Franklin School with 177 students in grades K-2
  - Jennifer Scardino, principal
- Memorial Campus with 72 students in grades K-2
  - Christina Bernardo, principal
- Washington School with 157 students in grades K-2
  - Christina Bernardo, Principal

Upper elementary schools

- Jefferson School with 233 students in grades 3-5
  - Joseph Vastola, Principal
- Roosevelt School with 306 students in grades 3-5
  - Peter Strumolo, Principal
- Lyndhurst Middle School with 616 students in grades 6-8
  - Michael Rizzo, Principal

High school

- Lyndhurst High School with 789 students in grades 9-12
  - Laura Vuono, principal

== Administration ==
Core members of the district's administration are:

- Joseph A. DeCorso, superintendent of schools
- James Hyman, business administrator and board secretary

== Board of education ==
The district's board of education, comprised of nine members, sets policy and oversees the fiscal and educational operation of the district through its administration. As a Type II school district, the board's trustees are elected directly by voters to serve three-year terms of office on a staggered basis, with three seats up for election each year held (since 2012) as part of the November general election. The board appoints a superintendent to oversee the district's day-to-day operations and a business administrator to supervise the business functions of the district.
