= Mackenzie Gress =

American soccer player (born 2004)

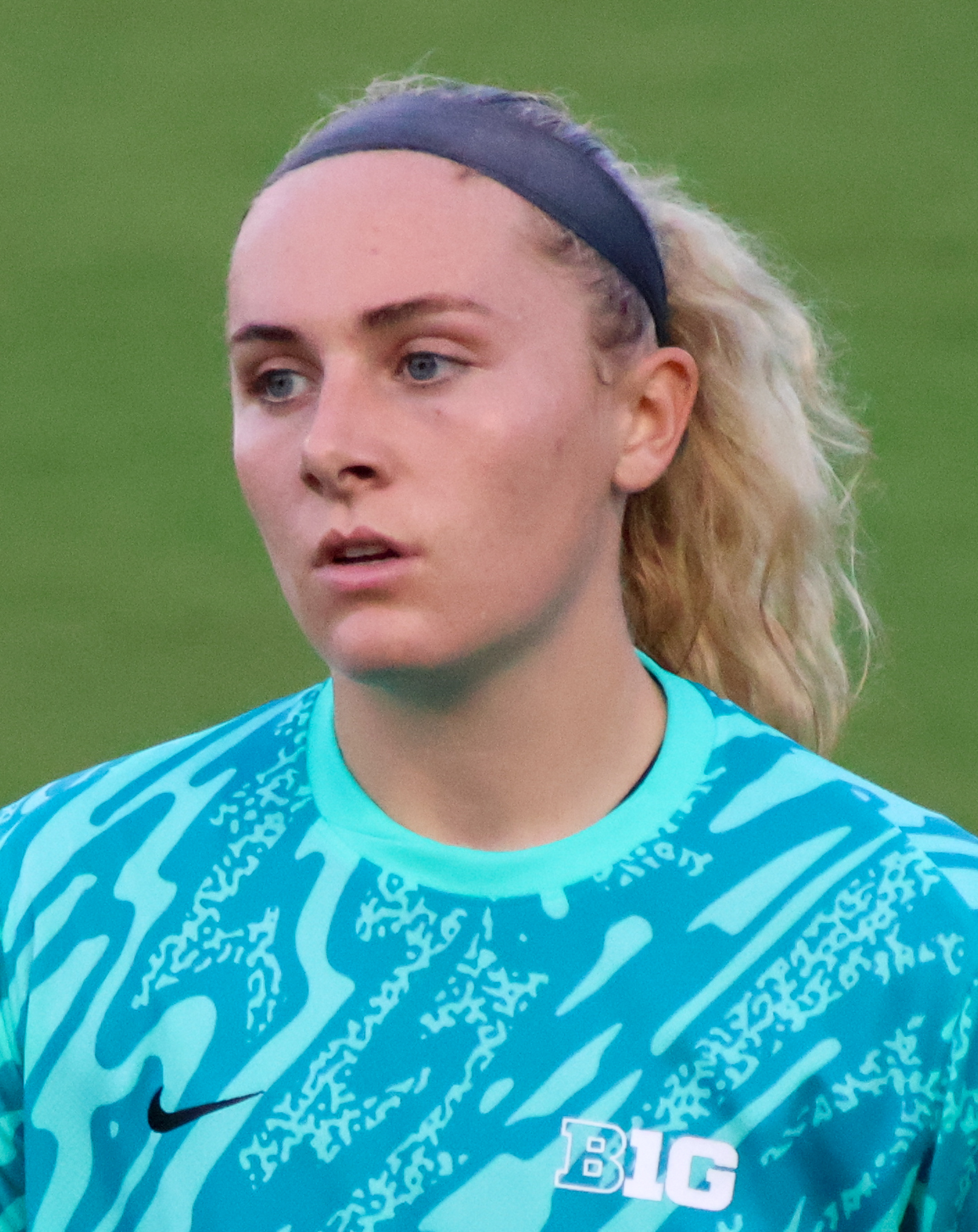
- Gress with Penn State in 2025

Personal information
- Full name: Mackenzie Lynn Gress
- Date of birth: June 3, 2004 (age 22)
- Height: 5 ft 9 in (1.75 m)
- Position: Goalkeeper

Team information
- Current team: Penn State Nittany Lions
- Number: 1

College career
Years	Team	Apps	(Gls)
2022–	Penn State Nittany Lions	17	(0)

International career^{‡}
2020	United States U-16	2	(0)
2024	United States U-20	4	(0)
Medal record
Women's soccer
FIFA U-20 Women's World Cup
Bronze medal – third place	Colombia 2024
- ‡ National team caps and goals as of September 21, 2024

Mackenzie Lynn Gress (born June 3, 2004) is an American college soccer player who plays as a goalkeeper for the Penn State Nittany Lions.

== Early life ==
Raised in Lyndhurst, New Jersey, Gress attended Lyndhurst High School but never played prep soccer there. She played club soccer for STA Girls Academy and was ranked by TopDrawerSoccer as the third-best goalkeeper of the 2022 class. She committed to Penn State as a freshman.

== College career ==
Gress redshirted her first season with the Penn State Nittany Lions and made only 4 appearances as an understudy to Kat Asman in the 2023 season. She became Penn State's first-choice goalkeeper in the 2024 season, though she missed a stretch of games while at the 2024 FIFA U-20 Women's World Cup and due to concussion protocol afterwards. She made 53 saves and kept 4 clean sheets in 13 starts, helping Penn State reach the NCAA tournament quarterfinals. She was named a team captain for the 2025 season.

== International career ==
Gress was called up to the United States national under-14 team in 2018. She played friendlies for the United States at the under-16 and under-20 levels. She was included on tournament rosters as Teagan Wy's backup at the 2023 CONCACAF Women's U-20 Championship and the 2024 FIFA U-20 Women's World Cup, where the United States won bronze, its best result since 2012.
