= Jacob W. Van Winkle House =

Historic house in New Jersey, United States

- U.S. National Register of Historic Places
- New Jersey Register of Historic Places
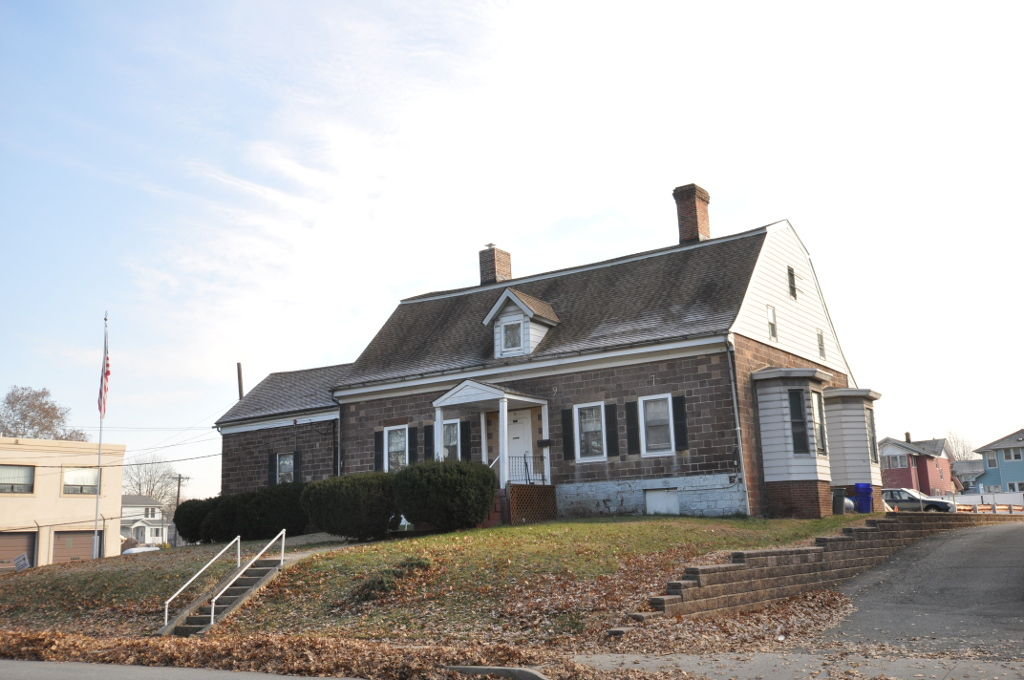
- 2018

- Location within Bergen County, New Jersey Location within New Jersey Location within the United States
- Location: 316 Riverside Avenue Lyndhurst, New Jersey
- Coordinates: 40°48′59″N 74°7′57″W
- Area: 0.9 acres (0.36 ha)
- Built: 1797
- MPS: Stone Houses of Bergen County TR
- NRHP reference No.: 83001588
- NJRHP No.: 554

Significant dates
- Added to NRHP: January 10, 1983
- Designated NJRHP: October 3, 1980

The Jacob W. Van Winkle House is located in Lyndhurst, Bergen County, in the U.S. state of New Jersey. The homestead was built in 1797 and is the current home of the Masonic Club of Lyndhurst. The homestead was added to the National Register of Historic Places on January 10, 1983.

== History ==
The Van Winkle House is a large brown sandstone structure that was built in 1797. The house was used as a residence until 1921 when Masonic Club of Lyndhurst purchased it.

Jacob Van Winkle donated the land on which the River Road School was built in 1804.

== See also ==
- National Register of Historic Places listings in Bergen County, New Jersey
- Jeremiah J. Yeareance House
