= Tom Longo =

American football player (1942–2015)

No. 45, 26, 21, 44, 46
- Position: Defensive back

Personal information
- Born: February 21, 1942; Lyndhurst, New Jersey, U.S.
- Died: July 2, 2015 (aged 73); Wayne, New Jersey, U.S.
- Listed height: 6 ft 1 in (1.85 m)
- Listed weight: 200 lb (91 kg)

Career information
- High school: Lyndhurst
- College: Notre Dame (1962–1965)
- NFL draft: 1965: 14th round, 188th overall pick
- AFL draft: 1965: Red Shirt 11th round, 83rd overall pick

Career history
- Brooklyn Dodgers (1966); Westchester Bulls (1967–1968); New York Giants (1969–1970); St. Louis Cardinals (1971)

Awards and highlights
- National champion (1964)

Career NFL statistics
- Interceptions: 4
- Fumble recoveries: 6
- Sacks: 1
- Stats at Pro Football Reference

Thomas Victor Longo (February 21, 1942 – July 2, 2015) was an American professional football defensive back who played three seasons in the National Football League (NFL) with the New York Giants and St. Louis Cardinals. He was selected by the Philadelphia Eagles in the fourteenth round of the 1965 NFL draft. He was also selected by the Oakland Raiders in the eleventh round of the 1965 AFL Redshirt Draft. Longo played college football at the University of Notre Dame.

== Early life and college ==
Thomas Victor Longo was born on February 21, 1942, in Lyndhurst, New Jersey. He attended Lyndhurst High School.

Longo first played quarterback, then running back and defensive back for the Notre Dame Fighting Irish.

== Professional career ==
Longo was selected by the Philadelphia Eagles in the 14th round with the 188th pick in the 1965 NFL draft. He was also selected by the Oakland Raiders in the eleventh round of the 1965 AFL Redshirt Draft. Longo played in 27 games, starting fourteen, for the New York Giants from 1969 to 1970. He played in two games for the St. Louis Cardinals in 1971.

== Personal life ==
Longo was active with the NFL Retired Players Foundation. He died of mesothelioma on July 2, 2015.
