= Anthony J. Cirone =

- Born: Anthony James Cirone; November 8, 1941; Jersey City, New Jersey, U.S.
- Occupations: Musician; author
- Instruments: Timpani; percussion
- Years active: 1965–present
- Education: Juilliard School

Anthony James Cirone (born November 8, 1941) is an American percussionist who was with the San Francisco Symphony and Professor of Music at San Jose State University from 1965 to 2001.

== Biography ==
Anthony "Tony" Cirone was born in Jersey City, New Jersey, the son of William Cirone and his wife Martha (Foglio) Cirone. His ancestors migrated from Campobasso, Italy, to the United States. Cirone grew up in Lyndhurst, New Jersey and attended Lyndhurst High School, where he was encouraged to pursue more advanced music training. He took lessons at the Gilio School of Music in nearby Rutherford from Jimmy Jerome, a local drumset player. He received his bachelor of science and master of science degrees from the Juilliard School of Music in New York City, New York, where he studied with Saul Goodman (timpanist of the New York Philharmonic) and Vincent Persichetti. In 1965, Cirone was appointed percussionist of the San Francisco Symphony under Josef Krips as well as Assistant Professor of Music at San Jose State University. He also taught at Stanford University from 1983 to 1992 and was Professor of Music and Chair of the Jacobs School of Music Percussion Department at Indiana University Bloomington from 2001 to 2007. He was inducted into the Percussive Arts Society Hall of Fame in 2007 and is part of the Modern Drummer Honor Roll, having been voted the Best Classical Percussionist over five years in a row.

Cirone composed the Portraits series for percussion, including Portraits in Rhythm, a collection of fifty snare drum etudes that are among the most popular for the instrument. He lives in Redwood City, California.

== Publications ==
=== Percussion Books ===
- Portrait in Rhythm
- Portrait in Melody
- Portrait for Timpani
- Portrait for Multiple Percussion
- Portrait for Drumset
- Simple Steps to Percussion Ensemble
- Simple Steps to Snare Drum
- Simple Steps to Timpani
- Simple Steps to Keyboard Percussion
- The Orchestral Snare Drummer
- The Orchestral Timpanist
- The Orchestral Mallet Player
- Romantic Encounters for Marimba
- Symphonic Repertoire for Cymbals
- Symphonic Repertoire for Snare Drum
- Symphonic Repertoire for Keyboard Percussion
- Symphonic Repertoire for Percussion Accessories
- Symphonic Repertoire for Timpani

=== Percussion Works ===
- Assimilation for Percussion Sextet
- Escapade for Unaccompanied Snare Drum
- Sonata #1 for Timpani and Piano
- Sonata #2 for Trumpet and Percussion
- Sonata #3 for Clarinet and Percussion
- Sonata #4 for Violin, Piano and Percussion
- Rondo for Percussion Ensemble
