= Jeremiah J. Yeareance House =

Historic house in New Jersey, United States

- U.S. National Register of Historic Places
- New Jersey Register of Historic Places
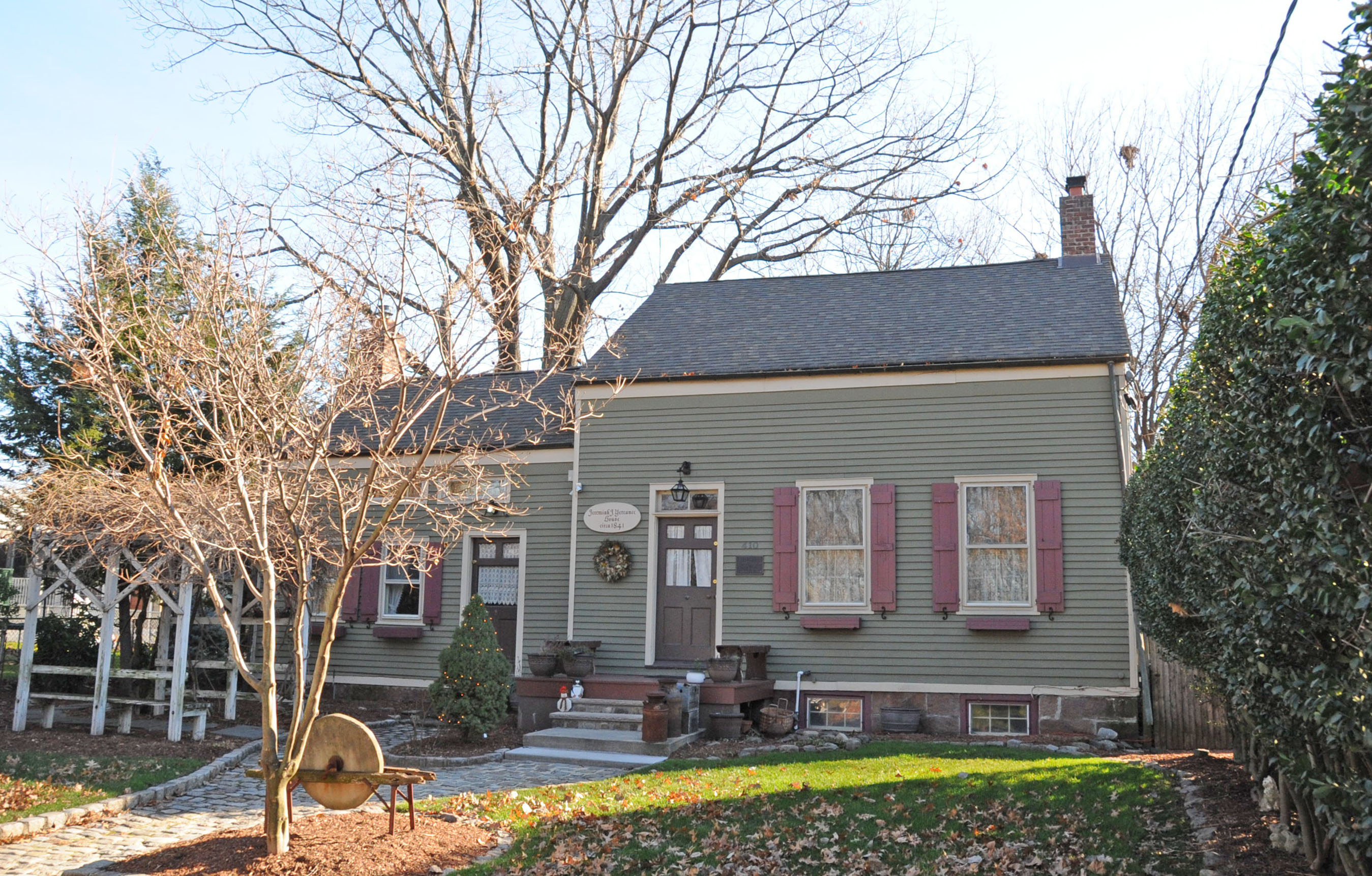
- Jeremiah J. Yeareance House

- Location within Bergen County, New Jersey Location within New Jersey Location within the United States
- Location: 410 Riverside Avenue, Lyndhurst, New Jersey
- Coordinates: 40°48′56″N 74°8′5″W
- Built: 1804
- NRHP reference No.: 86000628
- NJRHP No.: 555

Significant dates
- Added to NRHP: April 3, 1986
- Designated NJRHP: February 24, 1986

The Jeremiah J. Yeareance House is located in Lyndhurst, Bergen County, New Jersey, United States. The house was built in 1804 and served as a residence for the teacher of River Road School. The house was added to the National Register of Historic Places on April 3, 1986.

== See also ==
- National Register of Historic Places listings in Bergen County, New Jersey
- Jacob W. Van Winkle House
