= River Road School =

- U.S. National Register of Historic Places
- New Jersey Register of Historic Places
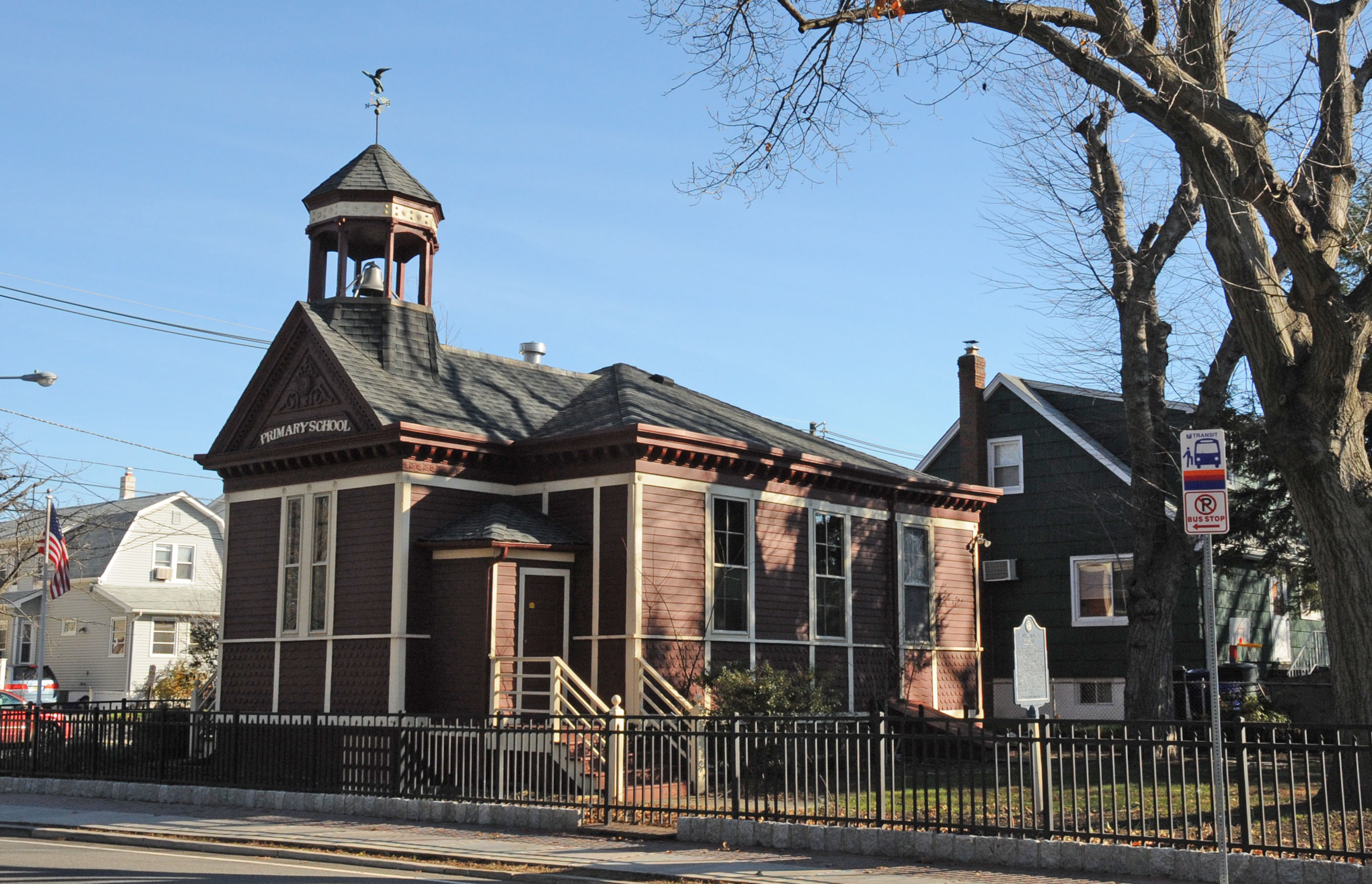
- River Road School

- Location within Bergen County, New Jersey Location within New Jersey Location within the United States
- Location: 400 Riverside Avenue, Lyndhurst, New Jersey
- Coordinates: 40°48′53″N 74°8′2″W
- Built: 1893
- Architectural style: Queen Anne
- NRHP reference No.: 77000844
- NJRHP No.: 553

Significant dates
- Added to NRHP: November 11, 1977
- Designated NJRHP: December 13, 1976

The River Road School is located at 400 Riverside Avenue in the township of Lyndhurst in Bergen County, New Jersey, United States. The schoolhouse was built in 1893 and is the home of the Lyndhurst Historical Society. The schoolhouse was added to the National Register of Historic Places on November 11, 1977, for its significance in architecture and education.

== History ==
A piece of land was donated on January 9, 1804, by Jacob Van Winkle for the construction of a school. The first schoolhouse was erected that year at a cost of $162.20. The first schoolhouse was replaced in 1849 by a two-story frame building. This second schoolhouse was torn down in 1893 and replaced by the current building at a cost of $2,541.83. The cupola and bell from the second schoolhouse were salvaged and added to the current schoolhouse.

In 2024, three teenagers faced burglary charges for breaking and entering the River Road School and stealing the front page of a newspaper covering 9/11 attacks.

== Little Red Schoolhouse ==
The wood frame building on a brick foundation features Queen Anne style. The Lyndhurst Historical Society operates the building as the Little Red Schoolhouse, a museum of local history.

== See also ==
- National Register of Historic Places listings in Bergen County, New Jersey
- Jacob W. Van Winkle House
- Jeremiah J. Yeareance House
