= Elizabeth Lindsay =

American discus thrower and Girl Scout

Elizabeth A. "Libbie" Lindsay (October 26, 1912 – March 16, 2013) was an American track and field athlete and Girl Scout activist. She was born in Lyndhurst, New Jersey and was a member of the first graduating class of Lyndhurst High School. She joined Girl Scouts in 1925, at the age of 13, with the encouragement of her father, as her mother, ill and housebound, was unable to supervise her outside of the home. Her first role in the organization was as a bugler.

Lindsay was active in track and field athletics in the 1930s and had her most successful year in 1937, when she was the Amateur Athletic Union's (AAU) champion in women's discus, with a throw of 107 feet, 11 inches. She came in third at the 1938 edition, but won that year's Metropolitan AAU tournament. She competed for the German-American Athletic Club. She set national records at the high school level and took part in the American trials for the 1936 Summer Olympics, but did not make the team, although she did have the opportunity to meet Jesse Owens. Lindsay remained active in the Girl Scouts for almost nine decades, serving as a troop leader and camp director.

During World War II she led local troops in making supplies for soldiers serving abroad. The local Girl Scout House was named the "Libbie Lindsay House" in her honor in 1991. By career she worked as a secretary with the Lyndhurst Board of Education. She never married and died March 16, 2013, in Lyndhurst, at the age of 100.
