= Wilma Marggraff =

American female politician

Wilma Marggraff was an American politician. She was a member of the New Jersey General Assembly from 1948 to 1954. She was the first woman to serve as director of the Bergen County, New Jersey Board of Chosen Freeholders. Marggraff died on February 21, 1989, at the age of 88.
