= Gateway Region =

Urbanized area of northeastern New Jersey, US

Coordinates: 40.8°N 74.2°W

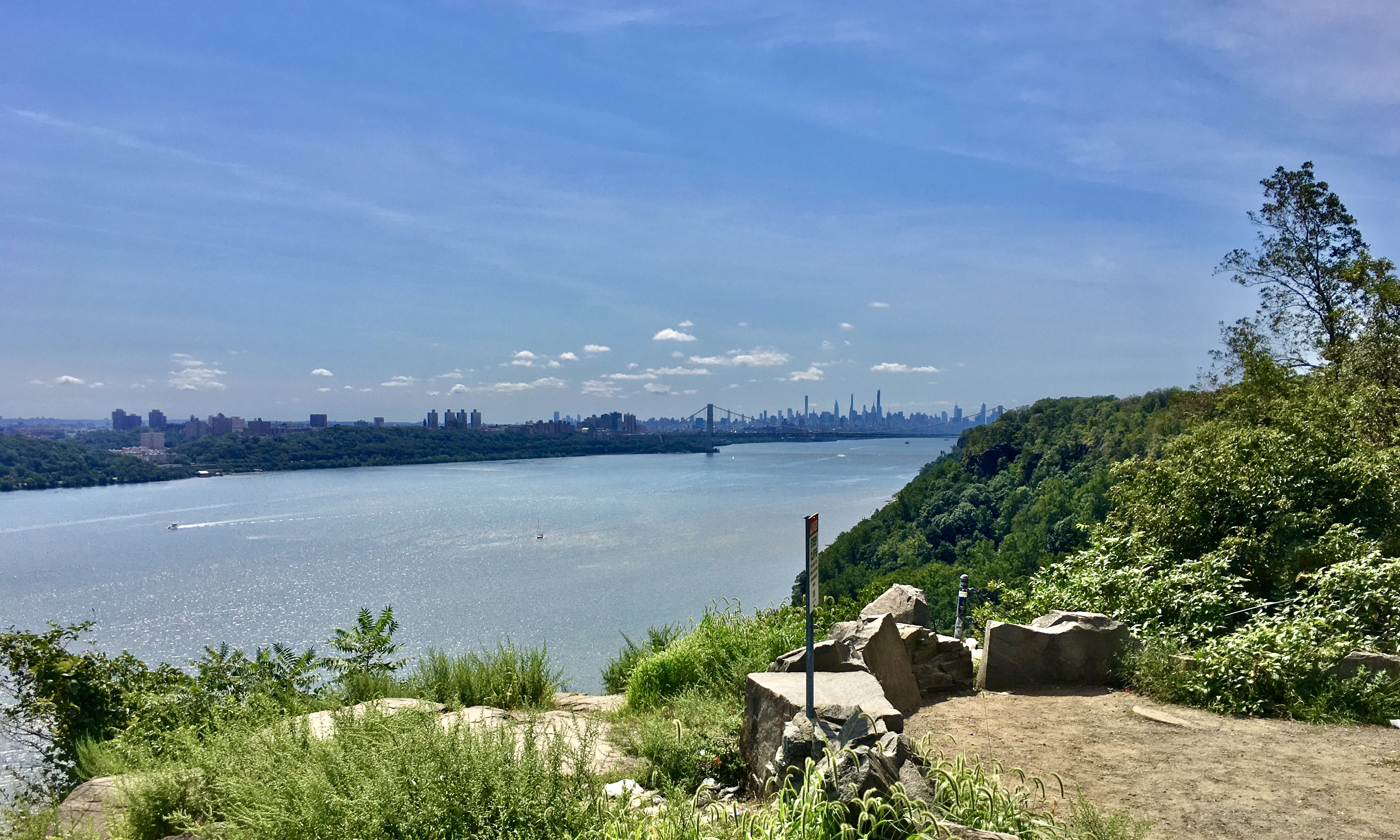
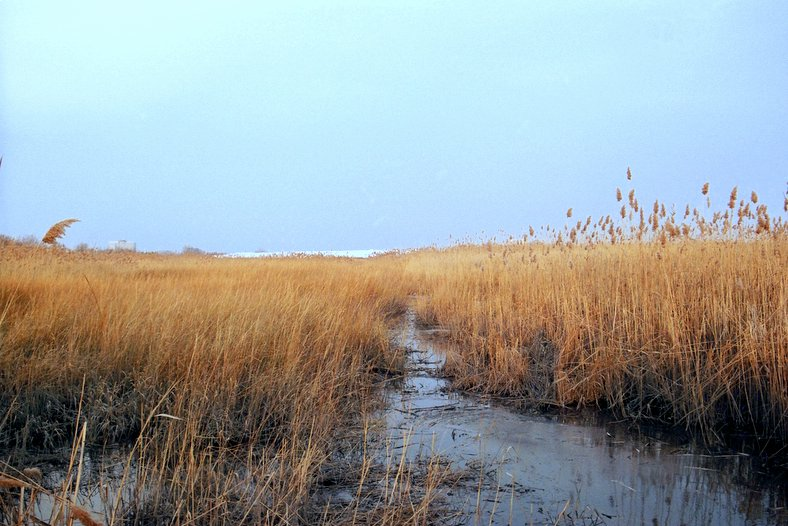
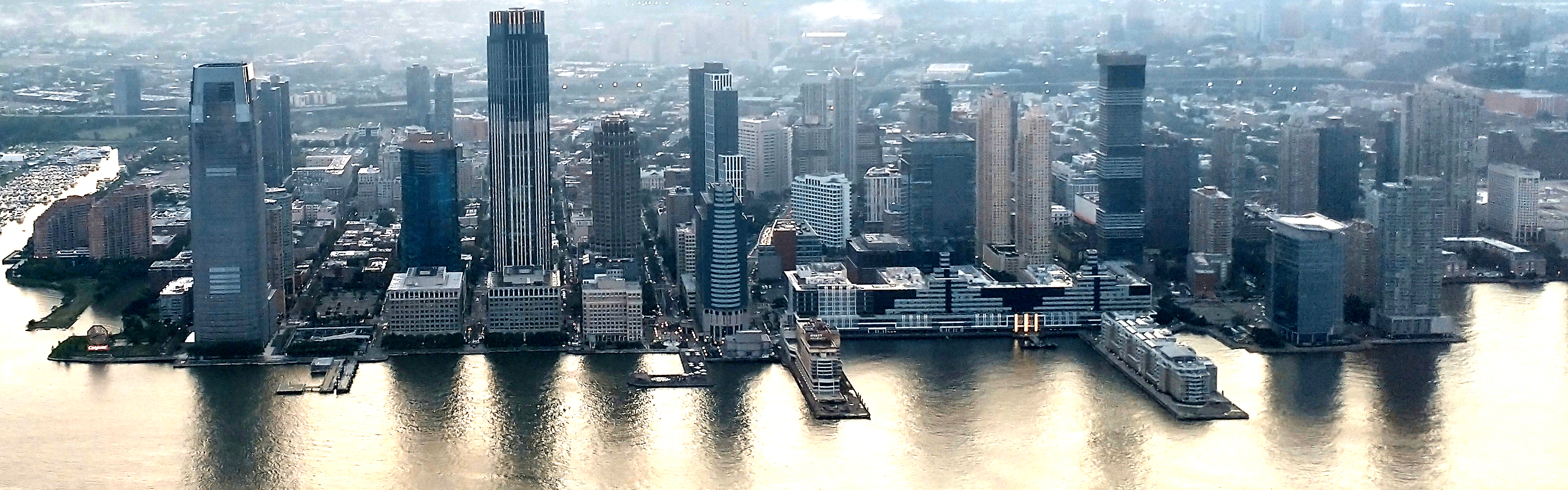
From upper left, clockwise: the Palisades overlooking the Hudson River; the Meadowlands; the Hudson Waterfront in Jersey City

The Gateway Region is the primary urbanized area of the northeastern section of the U.S. state of New Jersey. The region is anchored by Newark, the state's most populous city, and constitutes part of the New York metropolitan area.

The area encompasses Bergen, Essex, Hudson, Passaic, Union, and Middlesex counties. It is the most urban part of the state, with a population of more than four million, and is home to most of its larger cities, though much housing was originally developed as suburbs of neighboring New York City. It is home to Ellis Island, the "gateway" through which many immigrants entered the United States, many of whom chose to stay in the region, which continues to be the port of entry and first home to many born abroad, making it one of the most ethnically diverse of the nation. It may also be the most socio-economically diverse, with some of the biggest pockets of poverty and most exclusive of suburbs in the state.

The designation Gateway Region has not caught on in local parlance, as the topography and self-identification of the residents tend not to correspond to the collective name. The terms North Jersey and Central Jersey are used in describing parts of the Gateway. The name may have been taken from the 1960s Newark nickname Gateway City after the newly developed Gateway Center downtown. Amtrak's high-speed rail project throughout the region is called Gateway. It is one of seven tourism regions established by the New Jersey State Department of Tourism, the others being the Greater Atlantic City Region, the Southern Shore Region, the Delaware River Region, the Shore Region, Central Jersey Region, and the Skylands Region. The Gateway National Recreation Area, though not located inside the Gateway Region, is nearby.

== Geography ==
The Gateway Region is home to six of New Jersey's largest municipalities: Newark, Jersey City, Paterson, Elizabeth, Woodbridge Township, and Edison. Major rivers and the bays include the Hudson River/Upper New York Bay, the Hackensack River and the Passaic River/Newark Bay, and the Raritan. The topography of the area is quite varied, with the Palisades and the Meadowlands in the northeast, the hills and valleys of the Watchung Mountains in the west, the Ramapo Mountains in the north, and tidal plains of the Raritan to the south. The confluence of the roads and railways of the Northeast Megalopolis make the region very heavily traveled. Chemical Coast is a nickname for the heavily industrial area along the Arthur Kill. Though there are broad distinctions between cities, suburbs, heavy industry, light manufacturing, recreational "green spaces", nature preserves, and retail, transportation, and maritime infrastructure, the landscape is characterized by their close proximity to each other, as is typical of urban sprawl.

== History ==
=== Lenape and New Netherland ===
The Gateway Region was the territory of the Lenape Native Americans. Later called Delaware Indian, this collection of Algonquian-language speaking people included the Hackensack, Raritan, and Tappan. They are recalled in the countless number of place names given by them to towns, hills, and bodies of water. Much of the land was "purchased" by Dutch and English from the Lenape, though this concept of "ownership" was foreign to them. The Lenape retreated to the west as settlements grew, and "agreed" to re-locate in 1766 with the Treaty of Easton, though the Ramapough Mountain Indians say they descend from them.

Henry Hudson, an Englishman sailing for the Dutch East India Company anchored his ship the Halve Maen (Half Moon) at Sandy Hook and Weehawken Cove in 1609. The area became part of the colonial province of New Netherland with headquarters in New Amsterdam. In 1630 the patroonship Pavonia was established and 1660, after series of confrontations with the Lenape, that the first chartered village was established on the west bank of the North River at Bergen Square, creating the oldest municipality in the state. Descendants of the New Netherlanders spread across North Jersey, and influenced its development and character for generations.

=== Colonial America ===
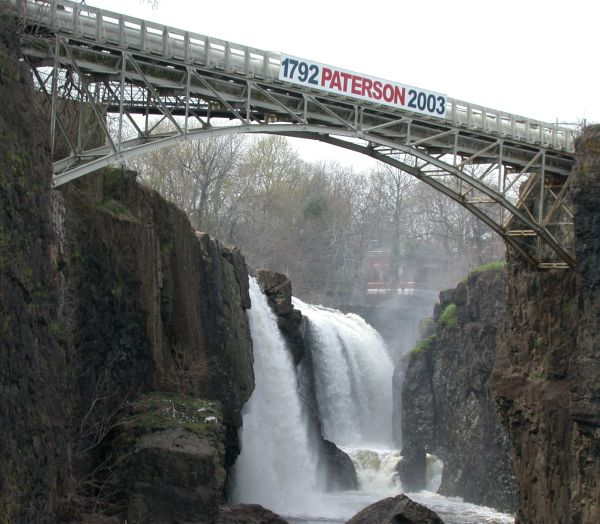
The Great Falls of the Passaic River in Paterson

When the English entered New York Harbor in 1664, a negotiated surrender (which guaranteed religious tolerance and protection of private property) was made to transfer control of the area to the British crown. Elizabethtown was founded as the capitol and became the first officially English-speaking settlement, named after the wife of the province's proprietor, Sir George Cateret. In 1666, Newark was established by Puritans from Connecticut. By 1675, the region become the proprietary colony of East Jersey (establishing a border with New York State, which was formalized in 1738). It was partitioned into four counties for administrative purposes: Bergen County, Essex County, Middlesex County and Monmouth County. Settlement remained sparse, though some towns were created within farming communities and along rivers and bays. Among them are Perth Amboy in 1684, Hackensack and Piscataway in 1693, and New Brunswick in 1736 (which later became home to Rutgers University). During the 18th century, migration inland increased along the Horseneck Tract and Raritan Valley. Slavery and indenture were encouraged to populate the area. The third public reading of The Declaration of Independence took place in New Brunswick, but many East Jerseyans became Tories. Several battles of American Revolution took place in the region including those at Connecticut Farms, Bound Brook, and Paulus Hook.

=== Invention, industry and immigration ===
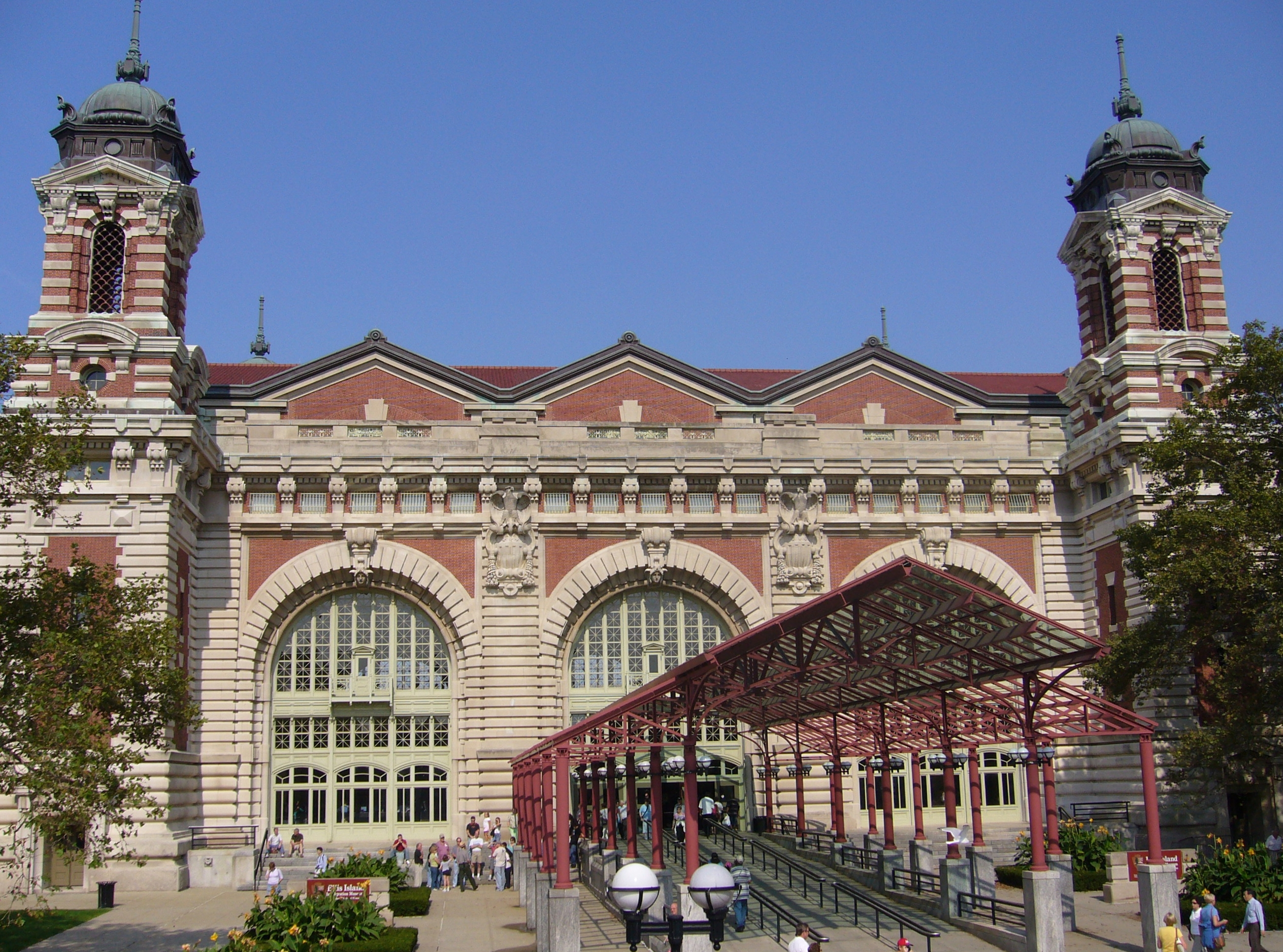
Ellis Island was the first stop for most immigrants from Europe

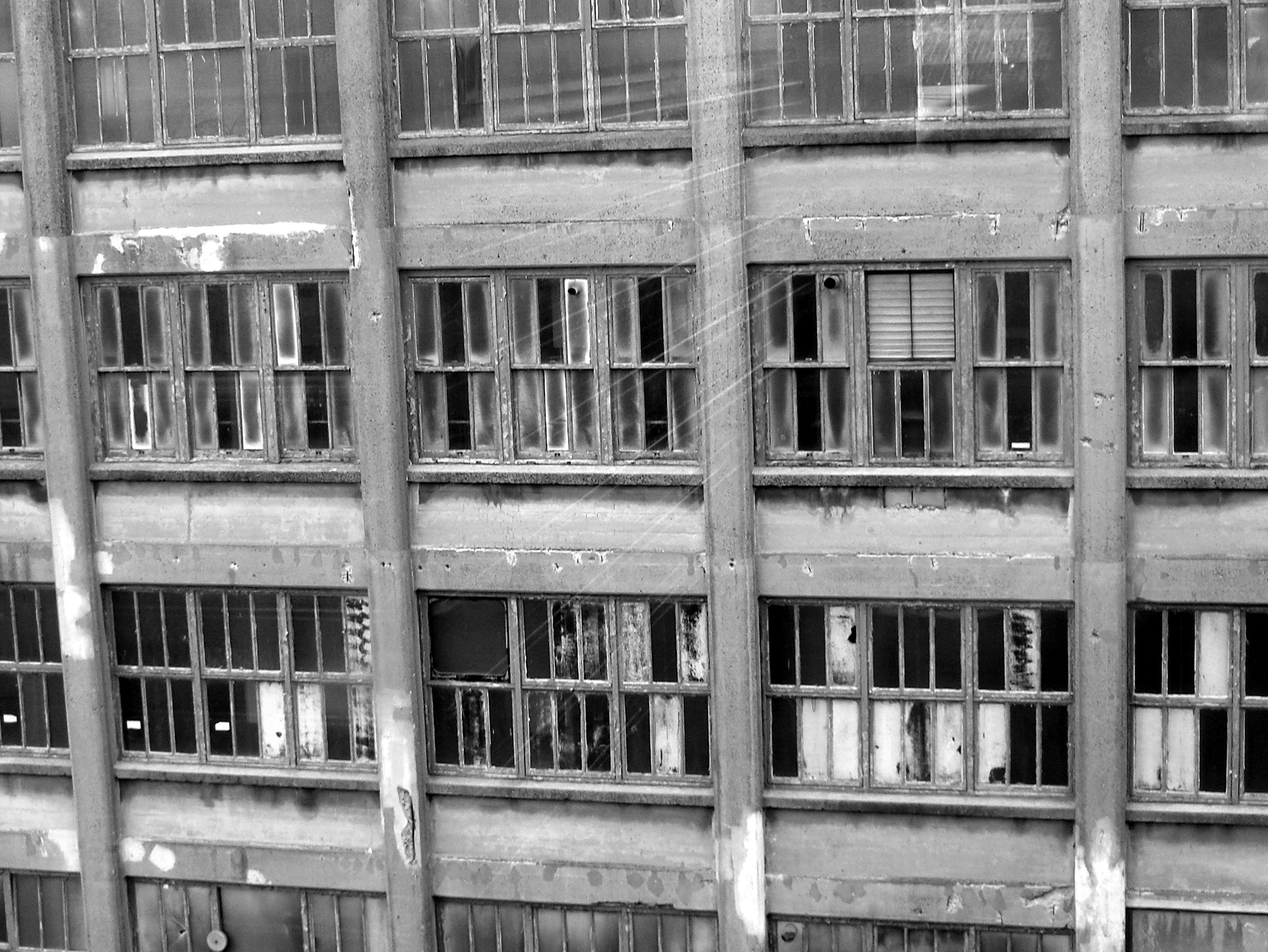
The Thomas Edison factory in West Orange

The first steam engine in America was introduced at the Schuyler Copper Mine on New Barbadoes Neck in 1755. In 1791, Alexander Hamilton helped found the Society for the Establishment of Useful Manufactures (S.U.M.), which encouraged the harnessing of the water power of the Great Falls of the Passaic and to secure economic independence from British manufacturers. Paterson, which was founded by the society, became the cradle of the industrial revolution in America, supported in part by the Morris Canal built in the 1820s. A century later Thomas Edison, the Wizard of Menlo Park, made his mark. In 1872 the Singer Manufacturing Company of New York opened a factory in Elizabethport along Trumbull Street next to the intersection of the CNJ mainline with the Perth Amboy and Elizabethport Branch. Many discoveries and inventions, or application or mass production of them, were made in the Gateway Region including the steam engine, the revolver, the incandescent light bulb, the phonograph, the rocket engine, and the electric railway. It is the site of the first automobile and first submarine in the United States. It can claim to the birthplace of baseball and the American film industry, Television to the home was first broadcast in the Gateway.

The latter half of the 19th century saw an explosion of the population. German immigration to the United States after 1848 gave the parts of the region a distinctly German flavor. Rail lines which still cross-cross the region, led to the development of the shipping industry at the North River (Hudson River), Newark Bay, and Kill van Kull, and the beginnings of suburban developments such as Llewellyn Park. Streetcar suburbs also began to develop elsewhere.

The Bayway Refinery, which started in 1907, is the nation's northernmost and is along the corridor with other heavy industry. It was at this time that the Chemical Coast began to be developed. The Paterson Silk Strike took place in 1913. The Hudson Waterfront became home to heavy industry and shipping. Among the industries that would prosper in the first half of the 20th century were Alcoa Aluminum, the Ford Motor Company, Lever Brothers, Valvoline Oil Co. and Archer-Daniels-Midland.

=== World Wars ===
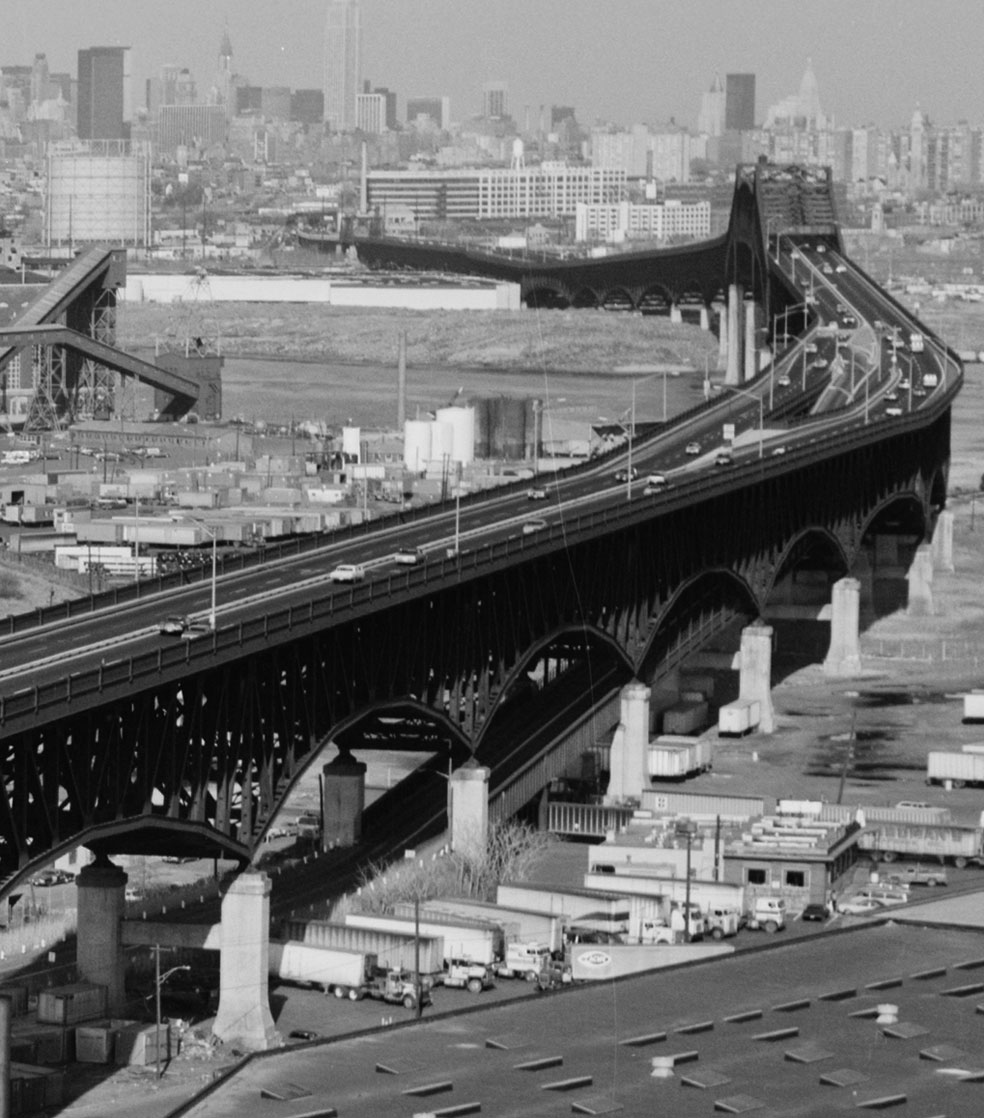
The Pulaski Skyway

While immigration to Ellis Island decreased the population continued to grow, in part due to the Great Migration. Upon entry into World War I, the US government took the Hamburg-American Line piers in Hoboken under eminent domain, which became the major point of embarkation for more than three million soldiers, known as "doughboys". Camp Merritt was established in Cresskill for troop staging. In 1916, an act of sabotage literally and figuratively shook the region when German agents set off bombs at the munitions depot in New York Bay at Black Tom. Another act of sabotage known as the Kingsland explosion occurred on January 11, 1917. The T. A. Gillespie Company Shell Loading Plant explosion, though not considered sabotage, also caused tremendous damage.

The forerunner of Port Authority of New York and New Jersey was established on April 30, 1921. Huge transportation projects opened between the wars: The Holland Tunnel in 1927, The George Washington Bridge in 1931, The Bayonne Bridge in 1931, and The Lincoln Tunnel in 1937, allowing vehicular travel between New Jersey and New York City to bypass the waterfront. Hackensack River crossings, notably the Pulaski Skyway, were also built. Newark Airport was the first major airport in the New York Metropolitan Area, opening on October 1, 1928. At Houvenkopf Mountain crosses were burned by the Ku Klux Klan. Radburn was founded in 1929 as "a town for the motor age". The Kearney Works of Western Electric kept the plant running with "make work" program, similar to WPA projects.

The region played an important role in the World War II effort. PT boats were manufactured by Elco in Bayonne. Military Ocean Terminal at Bayonne (MOTBY) was opened in 1942 as a U.S. military base (remained in operation until 1999). General Motors produced planes at Linden Assembly.The Federal Shipbuilding and Drydock Company would produce over thirty ships before its closing in 1949. In 1946, the baseball color line was first crossed at Roosevelt Stadium by Jackie Robinson.

=== Post-war prosperity and urban decline ===
The Second Great Migration and the G.I. Bill changed the social geography as well as the physical geography of the Gateway. Planned and built during the 1950s Port Newark-Elizabeth Marine Terminal is the first and largest container port in the eastern United States. Direct distance dialing (DDD) was introduced on November 10, 1951, in Englewood The northern parts of the New Jersey Turnpike were opened between 1952 and 1956. The metropolitan section (north of the Driscoll Bridge) of the Garden State Parkway was completed in 1957. Bergen Town Center was the first mall in New Jersey, opened in 1957, soon followed by Westfield Garden State Plaza. and The Mall at Short Hills. Port Newark-Elizabeth Marine Terminal became the nation's first container terminal in 1958, and was for many years its busiest. The Newark Riots and the Plainfield Riots took place in 1967.

=== Pre- and post-millennium ===
The New Jersey Meadowlands Commission was established in 1969 to protect the delicate balance of nature, provide for orderly development, and manage solid waste activities in the New Jersey Meadowlands District, and the Meadowlands Sports Complex opened in 1976. Terminals A, B, and C at Newark Airport were completed in 1973.

People's Express later made the airport its major hub, increasing the airport's passenger volumes. Liberty State Park opened in 1976. Gentrification of the Hoboken and Downtown Jersey City nineteenth-century districts began in the late 1970s, which led to the eventual redevelopment of the Hudson Waterfront. Secaucus Junction, Midtown Direct, and the Hudson–Bergen Light Rail began service and changed local commuting patterns. The Highlands Water Protection and Planning Act was passed in 2004 to protect the watershed which supplies much of the region. Cory Booker became mayor of Newark in 2006. The Prudential Center opened in downtown Newark in 2007. American Dream Meadowlands, a large shopping and entertainment complex, opened on October 25, 2019.

== Transportation ==
The Gateway Region has an extensive network of national highways, state freeways, and toll roads; commuter and long-distance trains; an expanding light rail system; local and interstate bus routes; and is home to one of the New York/New Jersey metropolitan area's three major airports. Much of the rail and surface transit system is operated by New Jersey Transit and the high transit ridership is mostly oriented to commuters traveling to downtown Newark, lower and midtown Manhattan, and increasingly, the Hudson Waterfront. Outside of the most "city-like" areas of Greater Newark, Elizabeth, Hudson County, and Greater Paterson, the automobile remains the most common means of intra-regional travel. The Port of New York and New Jersey is the busiest on the East Coast of the United States.

=== Rail ===
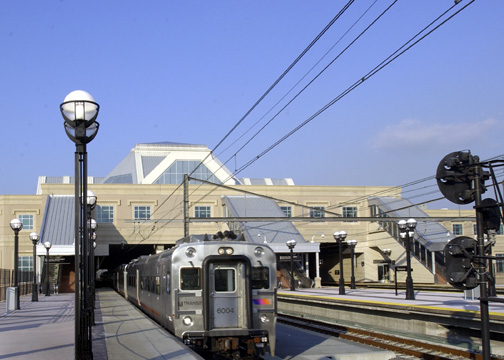
A train arriving at the upper level of Secaucus Junction station

- AirTrain: monorail system connecting Newark Liberty International Airport (EWR) with Amtrak and New Jersey Transit trains
- Amtrak: Northeast Corridor stations at Newark Penn Station (NWK), Newark Liberty International Airport (EWR), New Brunswick, and Metropark
- Hudson-Bergen Light Rail (HBLR): serving Bayonne, Jersey City, Hoboken, and North Hudson at the Weehawken waterfront, Bergenline (Union City/West New York) and Tonnele Ave (North Bergen)
- Newark City Subway/Newark Light Rail: serving downtown Newark, Branch Brook Park, Belleville, and Bloomfield
- New Jersey Transit Hoboken Division: Main Line (to Suffern, and in partnership with MTA/Metro-North, express service to Port Jervis), Bergen County Line, and jointly with MTA/Metro-North, Pascack Valley Line (limited AM inbound and PM outbound service), all via Secaucus Junction; Montclair-Boonton Line and Morris and Essex Lines (with some service via Secaucus Junction as Midtown Direct); North Jersey Coast Line (limited service as Waterfront Connection); Raritan Valley Line (limited service)
- New Jersey Transit Newark Division: Northeast Corridor Line, North Jersey Coast Line, Raritan Valley Line
- PATH: 24-hour rapid transit system serving Newark Penn Station (NWK), Journal Square (JSQ), Downtown Jersey City, Hoboken Terminal (HOB), midtown Manhattan (33rd) (along 6th Ave to Herald Square/Pennsylvania Station), and World Trade Center (WTC)
- THE Tunnel (see article for details on recent development)

=== Air ===
Commercial scheduled passenger service:

- Newark Liberty Airport (EWR), New Jersey's largest airport
- LaGuardia Airport (LGA) in Flushing, Queens
- John F. Kennedy Airport (JFK) on Jamaica Bay in Queens

General aviation:

- Essex County Airport
- Greenwood Lake Airport, Passaic County
- Linden Airport
- Teterboro Airport, Hackensack Meadowlands
- Old Bridge Airport
- Little Ferry Seaplane Base

=== Hubs ===
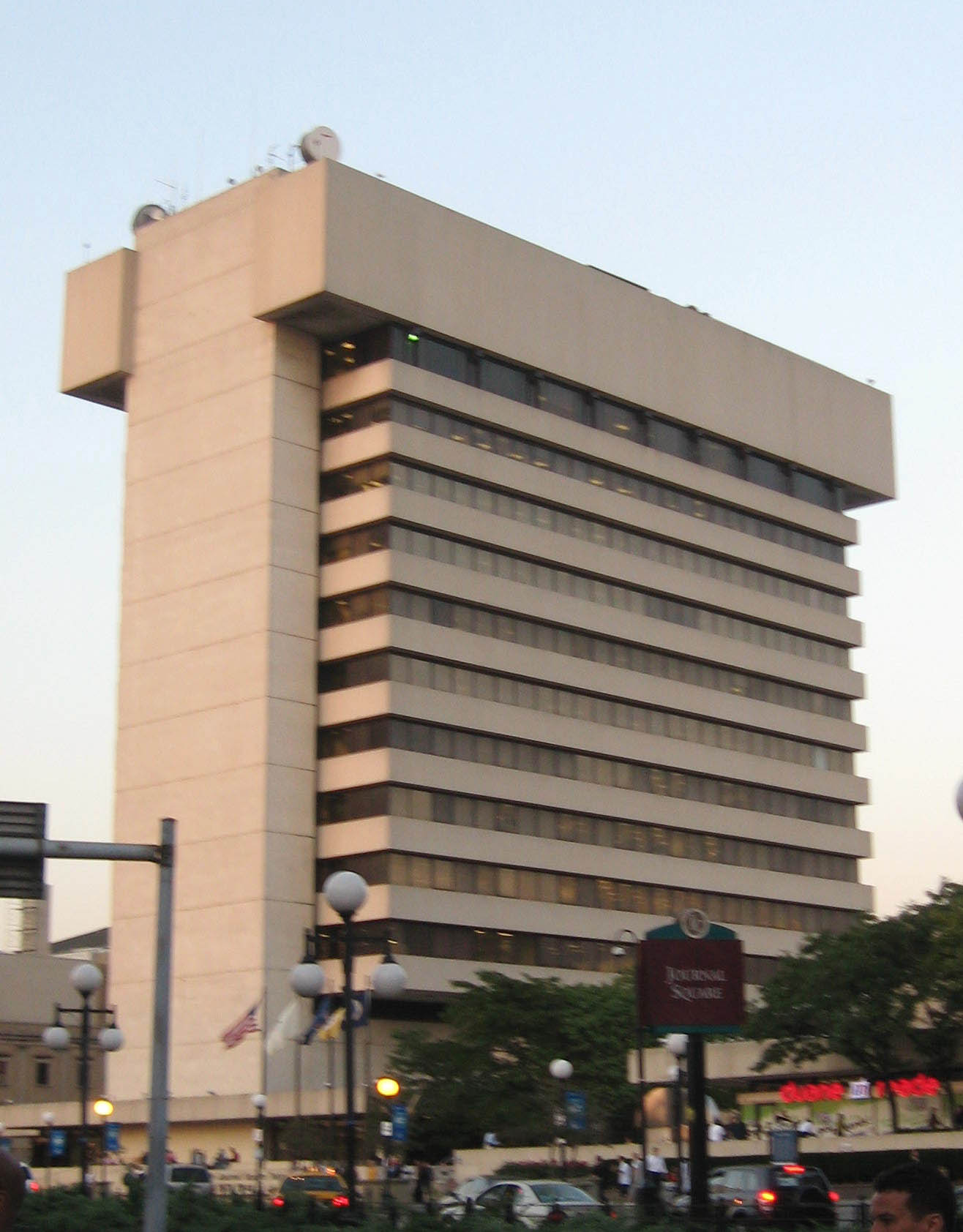
Journal Square Transportation Center

- Bergenline Station
- Paterson Broadway Bus Terminal
- Hackensack Bus Transfer
- Hoboken Terminal
- Exchange Place (Jersey City)
- Journal Square Transportation Center
- Newark Broad Street Station
- Newark Liberty International Airport
- Newark Penn Station
- Secaucus Junction

=== Interstate crossings ===
- Bayonne Bridge to Staten Island
- Goethals Bridge in Elizabeth to Staten Island, Interstate 278, Staten Island Expressway
- Holland Tunnel in Jersey City to Lower Manhattan, Interstate 78, U.S. Route 1/9
- Lincoln Tunnel in Weehawken to Midtown Manhattan, NJ 495, Route 3
- George Washington Bridge in Fort Lee to Upper Manhattan, Palisades Interstate Parkway, U.S. Route 46, Interstate 95, Interstate 80
- Outerbridge Crossing, from Perth Amboy to Staten Island

=== Major highways ===
- Garden State Parkway
- Interstate 78/278
- Interstate 80/280
- New Jersey Turnpike/Interstate 95
- New Jersey Route 3/495 (formerly Interstate 495)
- New Jersey Route 17
- Palisades Parkway
- Pulaski Skyway

=== Water ===
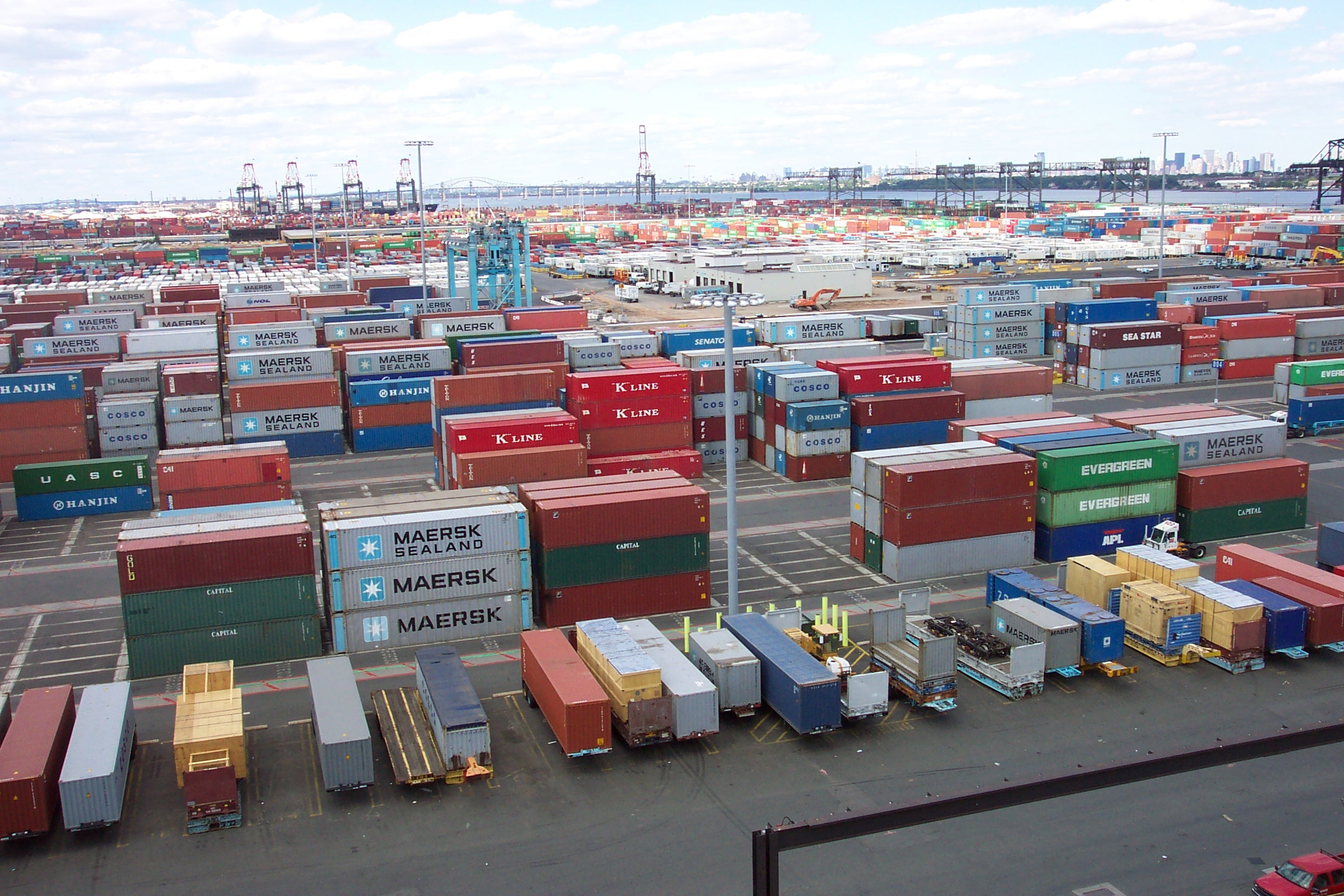
Containers at Port Elizabeth

- NY Waterway operates ferry service, from Paulus Hook Ferry Terminal, Hoboken Terminal, Weehawken Port Imperial, Edgewater Landing and other ferry slips in Jersey City, Hoboken, Weehawken to Battery Park City Ferry Terminal at World Financial Center and Pier 11 at Wall Street in lower Manhattan, and to West Midtown Ferry Terminal in midtown Manhattan, where free transfer is available to a variety of "loop" buses.
- From Liberty State Park Hornblower Cruises operates ferries the Statue of Liberty National Monument, Ellis Island and Liberty Island and Liberty Water Taxi runs routes to Paulus Hook and World Financial Center.
- Cape Liberty Cruise Port in Bayonne is one of three passenger terminals in the Port of New York and New Jersey.

=== Seaports ===
The Port of New York and New Jersey is the nation's third busiest. Port Newark-Elizabeth Marine Terminal, was the first in the nation to containerize, It and Port Jersey in Bayonne and Jersey City include large segments that are part of Foreign Trade Zone 49.

== Media ==
The Gateway is part of the Greater New York media market.

=== Newspapers ===
Many communities have weekly local newspapers specific to their towns, while other daily newspapers have a broader readership and are commonly available in retail shops and for delivery. The following newspapers are daily newspapers serving the Gateway Region market.

==== Published in New Jersey ====
- Herald News
- Home News Tribune
- The Jersey Journal
- The Record
- The Star-Ledger

==== Published in New York ====
- New York Daily News
- El Diario La Prensa
- New York Post
- The New York Times

=== Television ===
The region has ethnic market stations as well as commercial stations that mainly address the metropolitan New York City market as a whole. The WNJN network for New Jersey PBS affiliate stations provide New Jersey-specific news coverage.

Television stations located in and broadcasting from Gateway:

Cable and satellite

- CNBC
- TEMPO Networks

VHF stations (analog)

- Channel 9: WWOR-TV (My Network TV) – Secaucus (New York City)
- Channel 13: WNET (PBS) – Newark (New York City)

VHF stations (digital)

- Channel 8: WNJB (PBS) – New Brunswick – "N.J. Public Television"

UHF stations (analog)

- Channel 34: WPXO-LD (low power) (i) – East Orange
- Channel 39: WDVB-CA (The Pentagon Channel) – Edison
- Channel 41: WXTV (Univision) – Paterson (New York City)
- Channel 47: WNJU (Telemundo) – Linden
- Channel 50: WNJN (PBS) – Montclair – "N.J. Public Television"
- Channel 58: WNJB (PBS) – Newark – "N.J. Public Television"
- Channel 68: WFUT-TV (Telefutura) – Newark (New York City)

UHF stations (digital)

- Channel 40: WXTV (Univision) – Paterson (New York City)
- Channel 53: WFUT-TV (Telefutura) – Newark (New York City)
- Channel 61: WNET (PBS) – Newark (New York City)

=== Radio ===
Radio stations in the Gateway Region include:

- 620 WSNR Jersey City
- 930 WPAT Paterson (Ethnic programming)
- 970 WNYM Hackensack
- 1430 WNSW Newark
- 1450 WCTC New Brunswick (talk radio)
- 1530 WJDM Elizabeth and 97.5 Jersey City (Spanish programming)
- 1660 WWRU Jersey City (Korean programming)
- 88.3 WBGO Newark (Jazz/Newark Public Radio)
- 88.7 WPSC-FM Wayne (William Paterson University, indie hip hop)
- 88.7 WRSU New Brunswick (freeform)
- 89.1 WFDU Teaneck (Fairleigh Dickenson University, eclectic music)
- 90.3 WMSC Montclair (Montclair State College, indie/eclectic)
- 90.3 WVPH Piscataway (freeform)
- 91.1 WFMU East Orange (freeform)
- 93.1 WPAT-FM Paterson (Spanish contemporary)
- 94.7 WXBK Newark (Hip-hop music)
- 95.9 WYNE-LP Wayne (Christian programming)
- 98.3 WMGQ New Brunswick (adult contemporary)
- 99.1 WAWZ Zarepath (Christian contemporary music)
- 100.3 WHTZ Newark (pop music)
- 105.9 WQXR Newark (public radio)

== Annual events ==
There are re-occurring events throughout the year in the Gateway including street fairs, First Nights, Summer stock theatre, county fairs, fireworks, and other festivals. Among them are:

- All Points West Music & Arts Festival
- The Bamboozle
- Black Maria Film Festival
- Cherry Blossom Festival in Branch Brook Park
- Cuban Parade of New Jersey
- Philippine Fiesta at Meadowlands Exposition Center
- Geraldine R. Dodge Poetry Festival
- German-American Volksfest
- Hambletonian, the first leg of the Trotting Triple Crown, at Meadowlands Racetrack
- Hoboken Film Festival
- Hudson County Film and Video Festival
- Hudson River Waterfront Marathon
- Hungarian Festival
- Jersey City Pride
- Macy's Fireworks Spectacular on Independence Day
- Newark Black Film Festival
- New Jersey Jewish Film Festival, spring
- New Jersey Film Festival
- New Jersey Independent South Asian Cine Fest
- New Jersey State Interscholastic Athletic Association
- New Jersey Folk Festival
- Passion Play at Park Theater
- Portugal Day Festival, also known as Portugal Day Feast or Chop Fest
- Rutgers Agricultural Field Day
- Santakrusan Procession
- State Fair Meadowlands

== Exhibitions and performances ==
=== Historic sites and exhibitions ===
The Gateway Region is home to many points of historical interest, including districts, private homes, places of worship, train stations, civic and industrial architecture, and structures of engineering significance. The Statue of Liberty, Ellis Island, and the Central Railroad of New Jersey Terminal national symbols of mass immigration to the United States are all located on the Upper New York Bay. The Edison National Historic Site and the Great Falls of the Passaic River speak to the innovation of the region. Administered by the New Jersey Department of Environmental Protection, the New Jersey Register of Historic Places mirrors the National Register of Historic Places, and uses the same criteria for eligibility. Most counties have historical societies and many municipalities assign historic designation or preservation status. The New Jersey Historical Society maintains archives and promotes research. There are also museums with thematic exhibitions.

- Statue of Liberty National Monument, Ellis Island and Liberty Island
- Afro-American Historical and Cultural Society Museum
- American Labor Museum
- Cathedral Basilica of the Sacred Heart
- Aviation Hall of Fame and Museum of New Jersey
- Fort Lee Historic Park
- Hoboken Historical Museum
- Lambert Castle Museum
- Jewish Museum of New Jersey
- Thomas Alva Edison Memorial Tower and Museum
- Maywood Station Museum
- Museum of African American Music (under construction)
- New Bridge Landing
- New Jersey Naval Museum
- Paterson Museum at Rogers Locomotive and Machine Works
- Yogi Berra Museum and Learning Center
- Whippany Railway Museum
- National Register of Historic Places listings in Hudson County, New Jersey
- National Register of Historic Places listings in Bergen County, New Jersey
- National Register of Historic Places listings in Essex County, New Jersey
- National Register of Historic Places listings in Passaic County, New Jersey
- National Register of Historic Places listings in Union County, New Jersey
- National Register of Historic Places listings in Middlesex County, New Jersey

=== Science and natural history ===
- AIDS Museum
- Liberty Science Center
- Nature Center & Observatory at Rifle Camp Park
- Newark Museum
- New Jersey Museum of Agriculture
- Rutgers University Geology Museum
- William Miller Sperry Observatory

=== Visual arts ===
- Albus Cavus
- Bergen Museum of Art and Science
- Clifton Arts Center & Sculpture Park
- Hiram Blauvelt Wildlife Art Museum
- Jane Voorhees Zimmerli Art Museum
- Jersey City Museum
- Jewish Museum of New Jersey
- Montclair Art Museum
- Newark Museum
- Visual Arts Center of New Jersey
- Norton and Nancy Dodge Collection of Soviet Nonconformist Art

=== Music and stage ===
Located near New York City, many residents and visitors take advantage of and contribute to performances in music, theater, and dance. There are many theater and dance companies throughout the region. Major companies, events, and performance venues include:

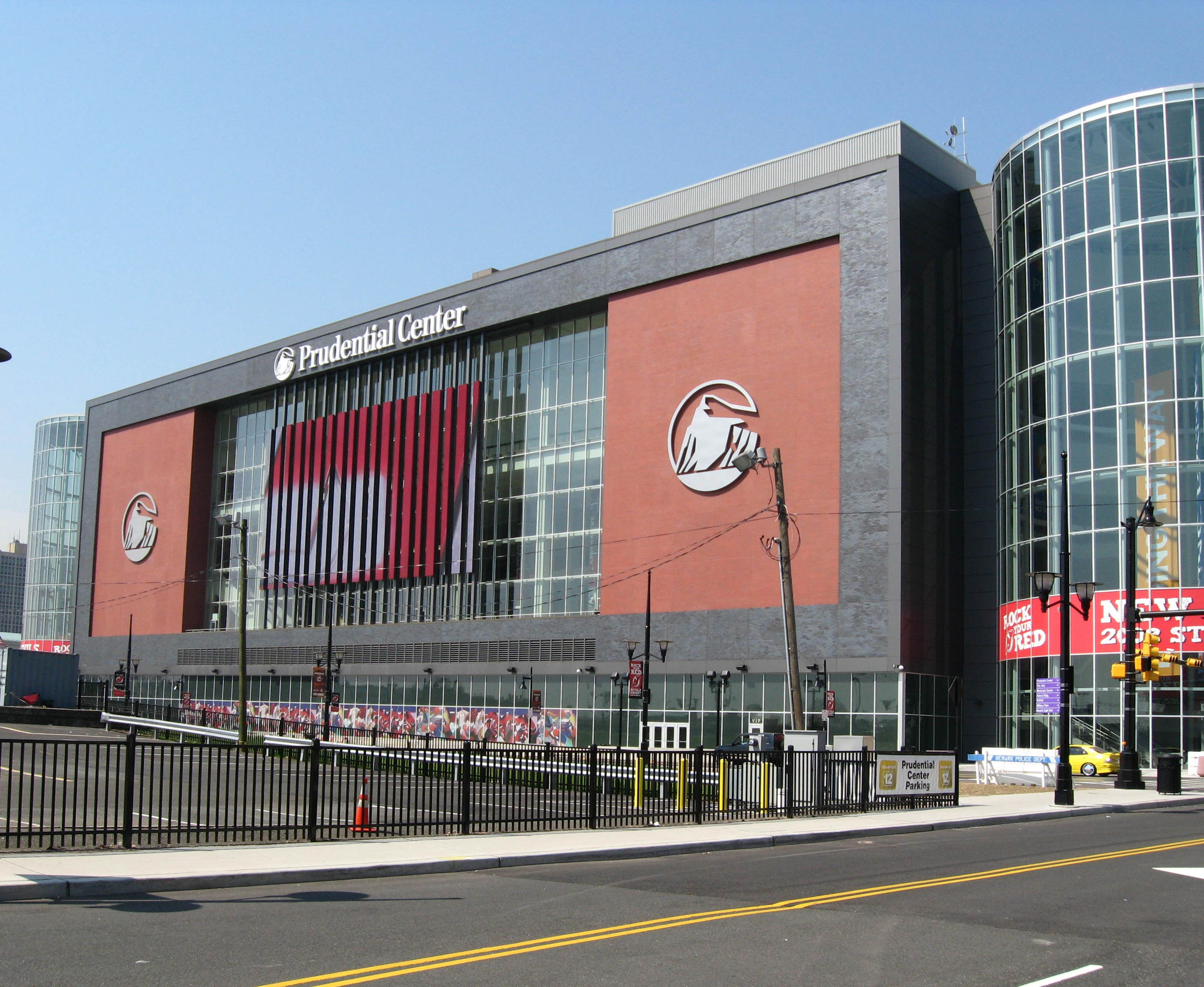
Prudential Center

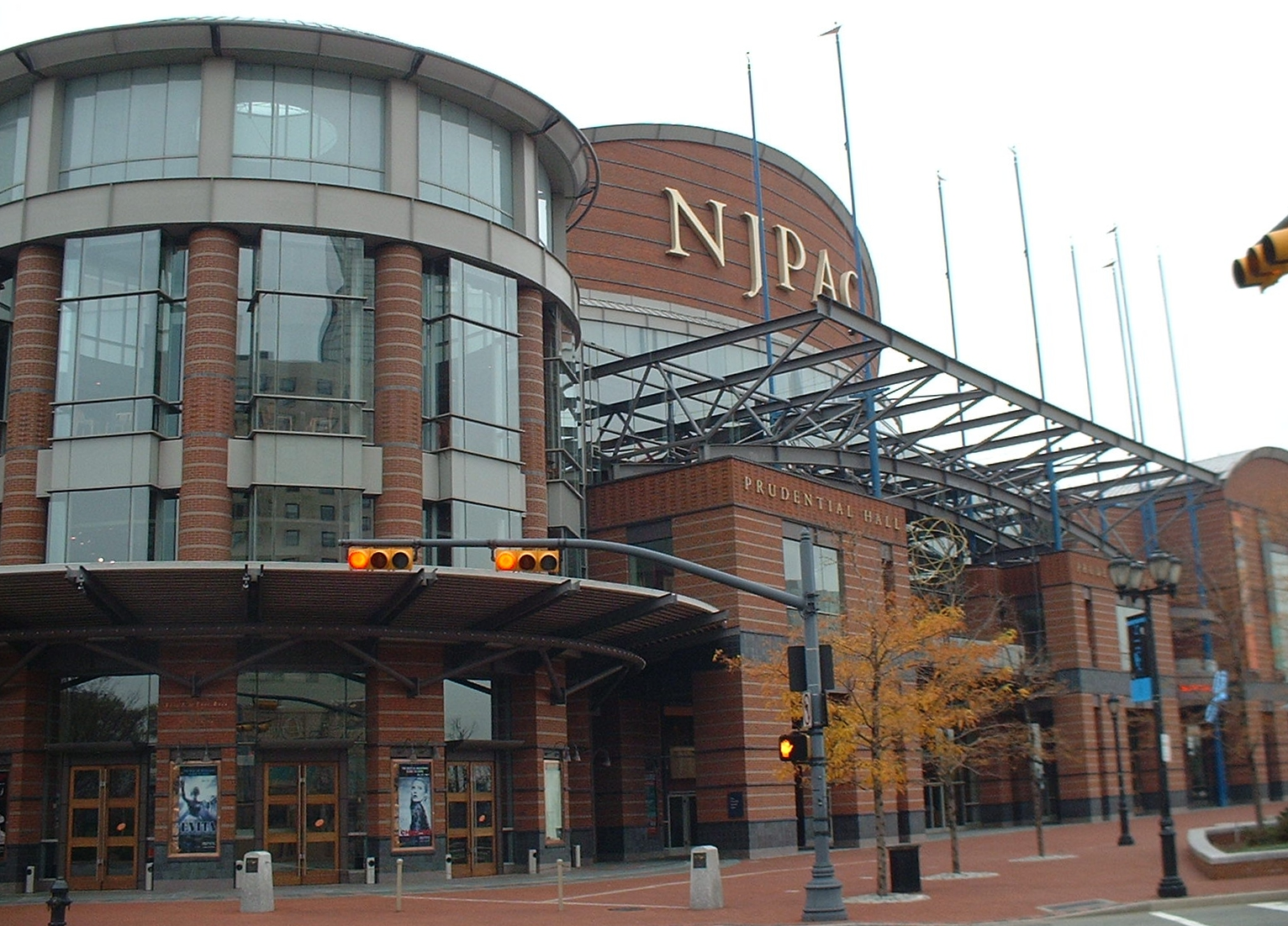
The New Jersey Performing Arts Center

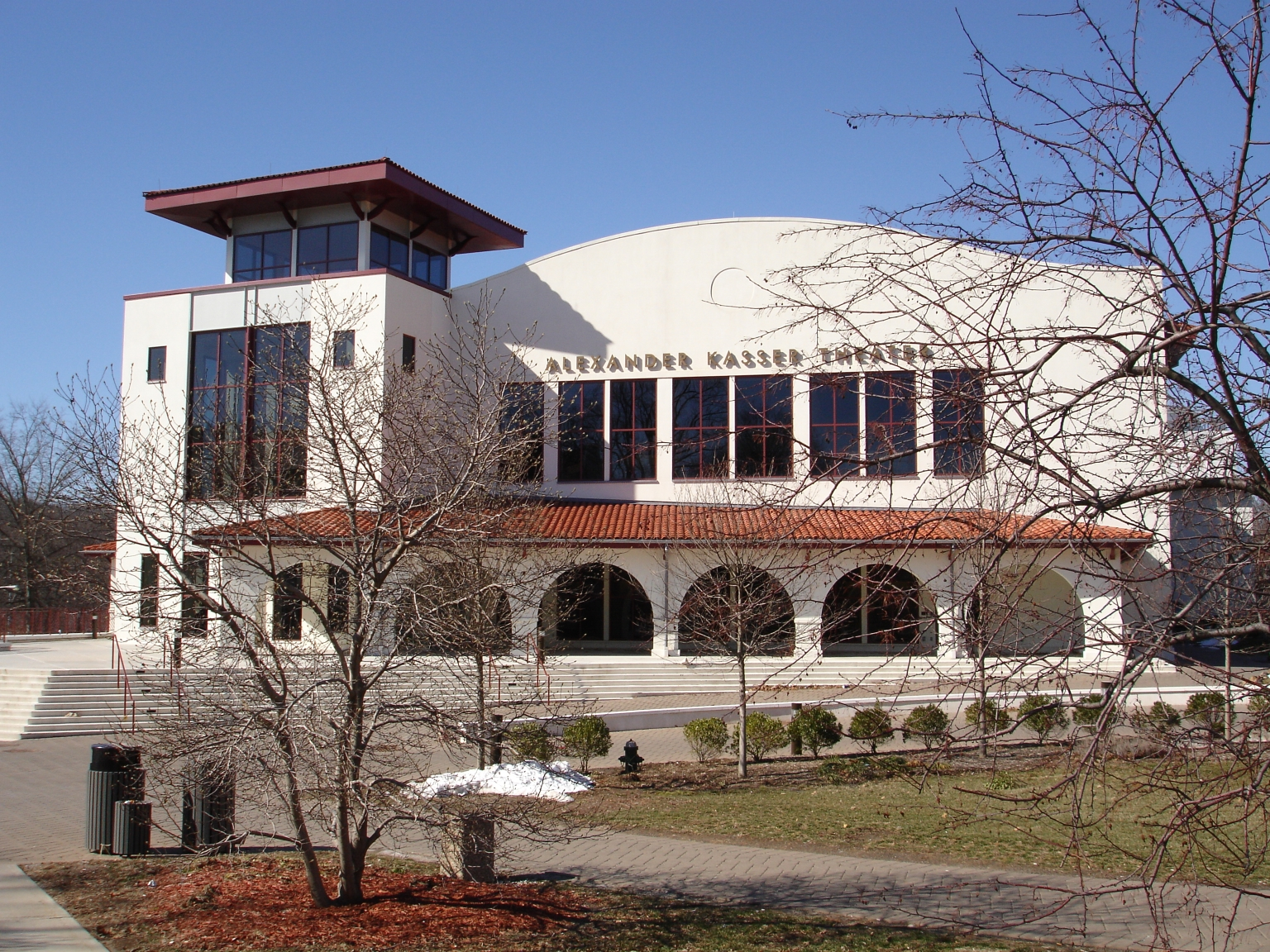
Kasser Theater

- Bergen Performing Arts Center
- DeBaun Center for Performing Arts
- Stephen J. Capestro Theatre
- George Street Playhouse
- Hudson River Performing Arts Center (proposed)
- Kasser Theater
- Loew's Jersey Theater
- Maxwell's
- New Jersey Ballet
- New Jersey Performing Arts Center
- New Jersey Youth Symphony
- New Jersey Youth Symphony
- Shakespeare Theatre of New Jersey at nearby Drew University
- Newark Symphony Hall
- Paper Mill Playhouse
- Park Performing Arts Center
- Premiere Stages
- Players Guild of Leonia
- Prudential Center, nicknamed the "Rock"
- Meadowlands Stadium and Meadowlands Arena
- State Theater
- Union City Performing Arts Center
- Union County Arts Center
- William Carlos Williams Center for the Performing Arts

== Sport teams and venues ==
The Gateway is home to five teams from major professional sports leagues playing in the state (though three teams identify as being from New York), as well as minor league teams. Since the 1970s several new stadiums and arenas have been built mostly near Downtown Newark or as part of the Meadowlands Sports Complex, which since 2009 can be reached with the Meadowlands Rail Line.

The teams are:

- National Hockey League – New Jersey Devils
- Major League Soccer – New York Red Bulls
- Major League Lacrosse – New Jersey Pride and Bergen River Dogs
- National Football League – New York Giants and New York Jets
- Great Lakes Indoor Football League – New Jersey Revolution
- Minor League Baseball teams – New Jersey Jackals, Newark Bears and Bergen Cliff Hawks
- Major Indoor Soccer League (2001–2008) – New Jersey Ironmen

The venues include:

- Bergen Ballpark at the Meadowlands (proposed) at American Dream Meadowlands
- MetLife Stadium
- Meadowlands Racetrack
- Izod Center, commonly called Meadowlands Arena
- Riverfront Stadium
- Prudential Center, nicknamed the "Rock"
- Red Bull Arena
- South Mountain Arena

== Nature and outdoor recreation ==
=== Environmental centers ===
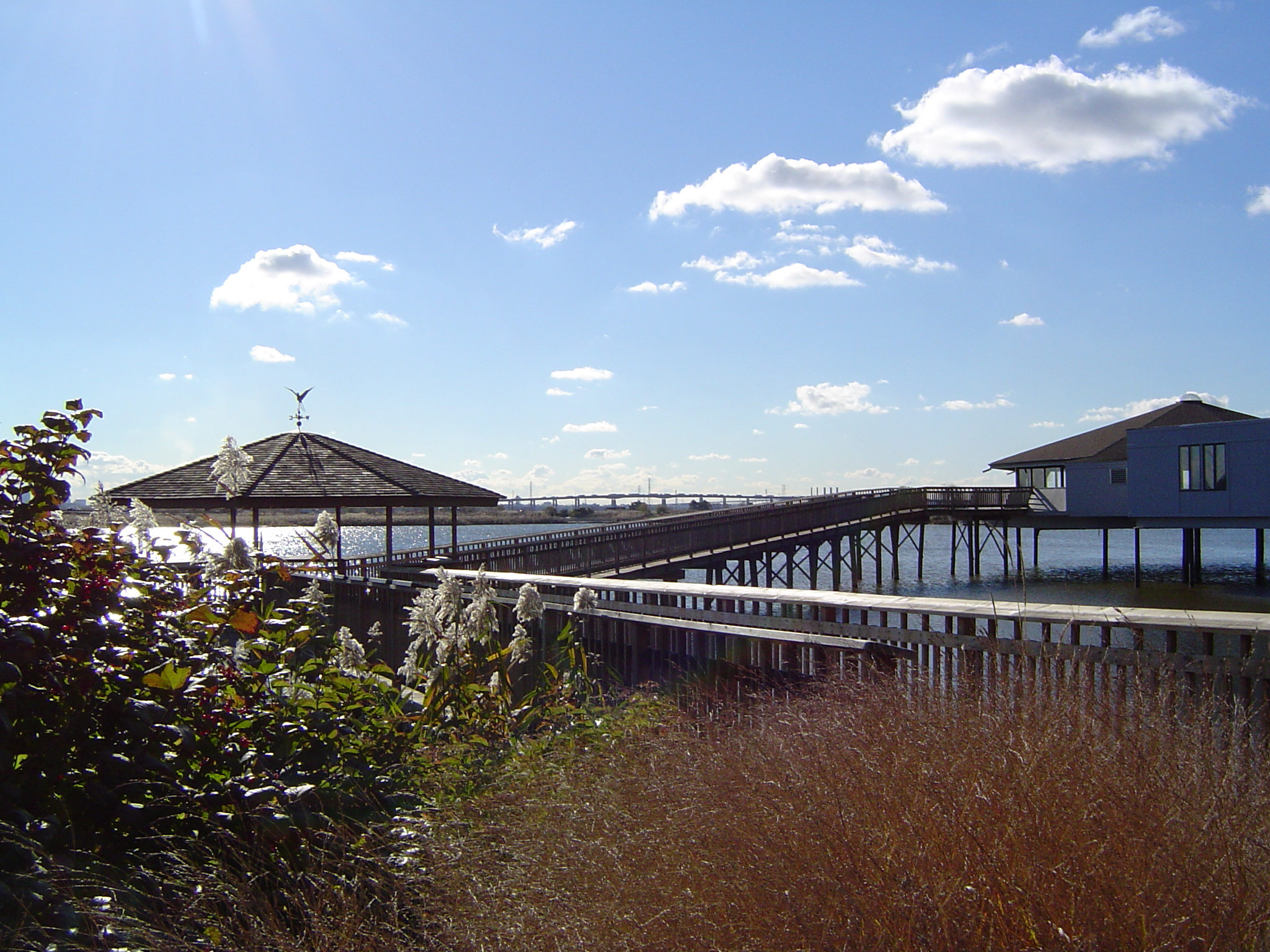
Meadowlands Environment Center

- Flat Rock Brook Nature Center
- Liberty State Park Interpretive Center
- Meadowlands Environment Center
- Nature Center & Observatory at Rifle Camp Park
- Tenafly Nature Center
- Trailside Nature & Science Center
- Cora Hartshorn Arboretum and Bird Sanctuary
- Closter Nature Center
- James A. McFaul Environmental Center (Wyckoff)
- Lorrimer Sanctuary (Franklin Lakes)
- Weis Ecology Center (Ringwood)

=== Horticulture ===
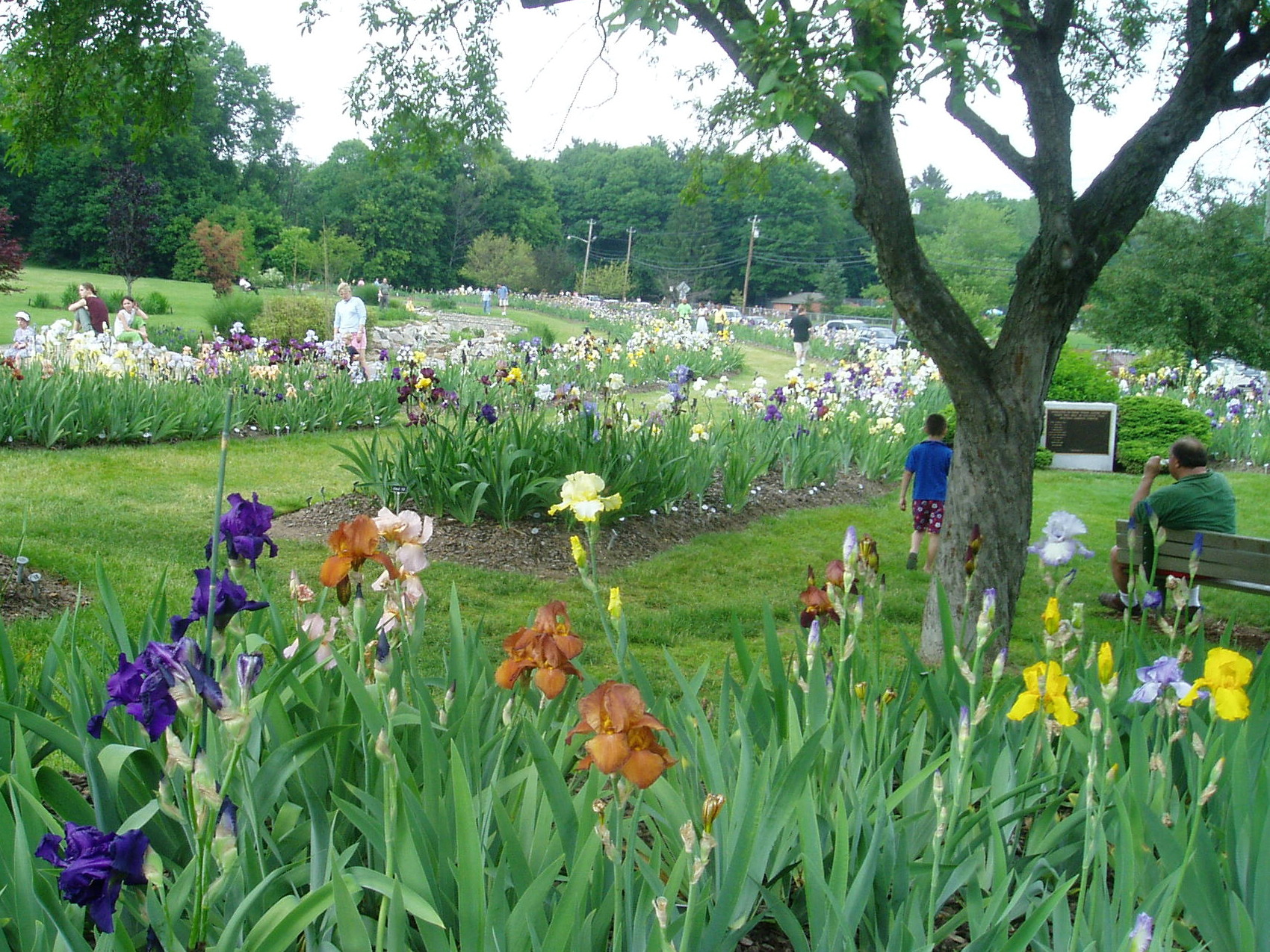
Presby Memorial Iris Gardens

- Branch Brook Park Cherry Blossom Festival
- Cora Hartshorn Arboretum and Bird Sanctuary
- Durand-Hedden House and Garden
- New Jersey State Botanical Garden – Skylands, Ringwood State Park
- Presby Memorial Iris Gardens – Montclair
- Reeves-Reed Arboretum – Summit
- Rutgers Gardens – Rutgers University, New Brunswick
- Howard Van Vleck Arboretum – Montclair
- Florence and Robert Zuck Arboretum – Drew University, Madsion
- Greenwood Gardens

=== National natural landmarks ===
- Great Falls-Garret Mountain
- Great Swamp
- Palisades of the Hudson
- Pigeon Swamp State Park
- Riker Hill Fossil Site

=== Parks, reserves, and forests ===
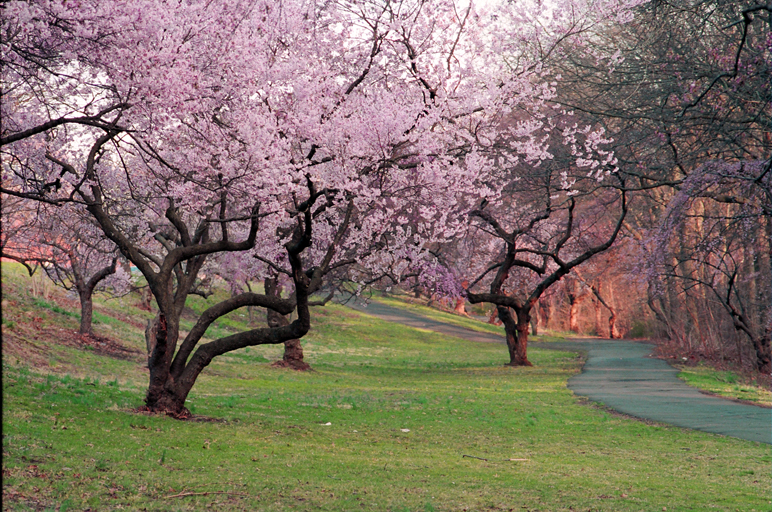
Branch Brook Park during the Cherry Blossom Festival

- Bergen Parks
- Hudson Parks
- Essex Parks
- Middlesex Parks
- Union Parks
- Watchung Mountain Reservations
- Branch Brook Park
- Cheesequake State Park
- Eagle Rock Reservation
- De Korte Park
- Gateway National Recreation Area at Sandy Hook
- Garret Mountain Reservation
- Hackensack RiverWalk
- Middlesex Greenway Trail, part of the planned East Coast Greenway trail
- High Mountain Park Preserve
- Hudson River Waterfront Walkway
- Liberty State Park
- Lincoln Park/West Bergen
- Mills Reservation
- New Jersey Meadowlands Commission
- Palisades Interstate Park
- Ramapo Mountain State Forest
- Ringwood Manor State Park
- South Mountain Reservation
- Wawayanda State Park
- Weequahic Park

=== Zoos ===
- Bergen County Zoological Park
- Newark Museum
- Turtle Back Zoo

== State prisons ==
- Rahway State Prison
- Northern State Prison

== Superfund sites ==
The region has some of the highest concentration of super fund sites in the nation.

- Kin-Buc Landfill
- Middlesex Sampling Plant

== Universities and colleges ==
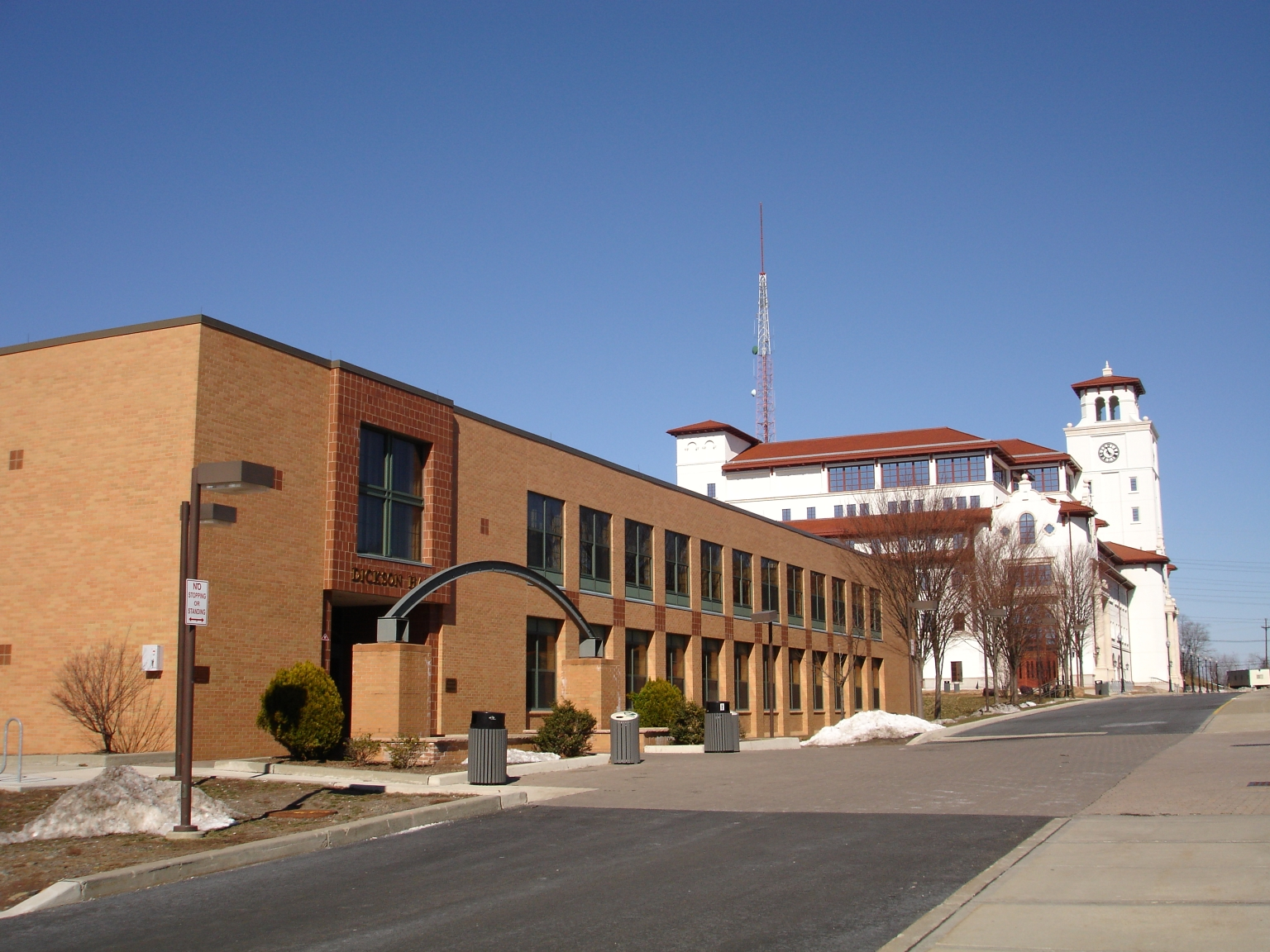
Dickson Hall (left)and University Hall (right) at Montclair State University

- Bergen Community College
- Berkeley College
- Bloomfield College
- Caldwell College
- Essex County College
- Fairleigh Dickinson University
- Felician College
- Gibbs College
- Hudson County Community College

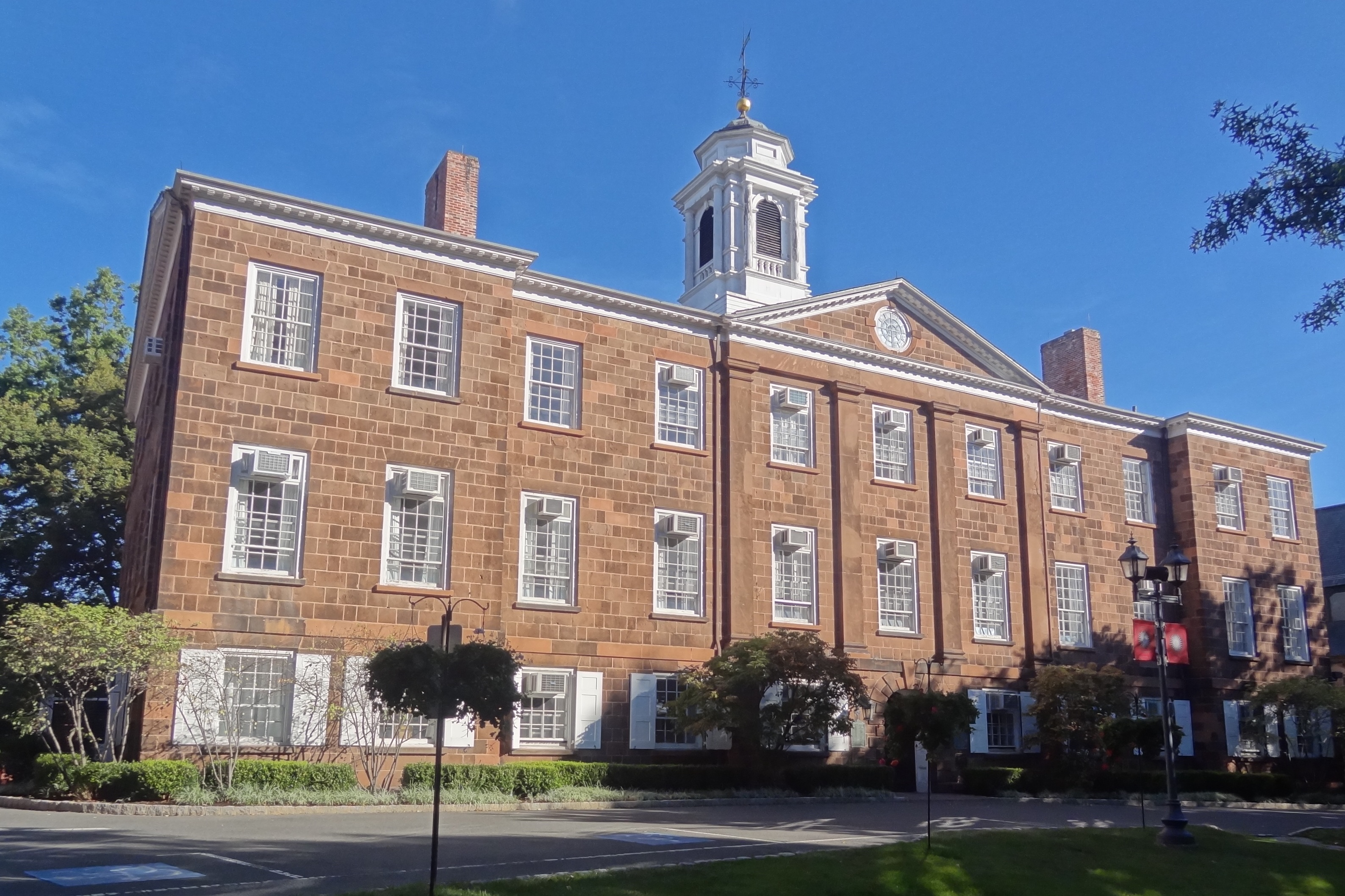
Old Queens, the oldest building at Rutgers University in New Brunswick, built between 1809 and 1825

- Kean University
- Middlesex County College
- Montclair State University
- New Brunswick Theological Seminary
- New Jersey City University
- New Jersey Institute of Technology
- Passaic County Community College
- Ramapo College
- Raritan Valley Community College

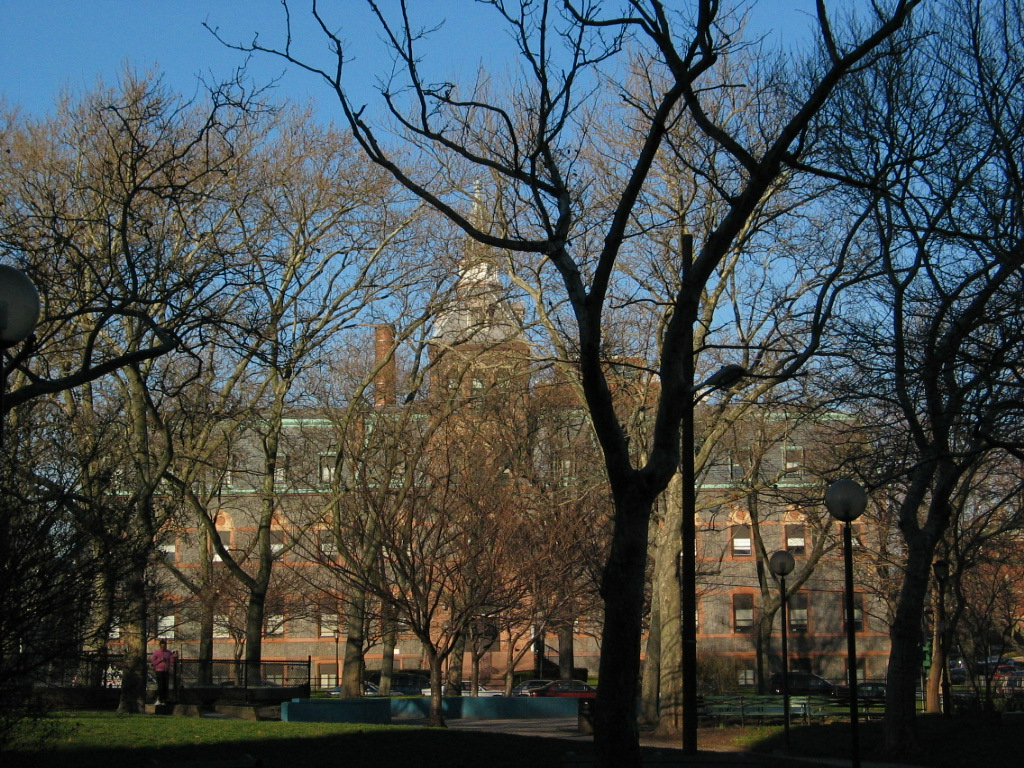
Stevens Institute

- Rutgers University
- Saint Peter's University
- Seton Hall University
- Stevens Institute of Technology
- Union County College
- University of Medicine and Dentistry of New Jersey
- William Paterson University

== See also ==
- New York metropolitan area
- Port Authority of New York and New Jersey
- Tri-State Region
- North Jersey Shared Assets Area
- North Jersey
- Regions of New Jersey
