= Stag Hill =

Stag Hill may refer to:

- Stag Hill, Guildford, a neighbourhood in Guildford, England
- Houvenkopf Mountain, New Jersey
- Stag Hill, University of Surrey, the main campus of the university
