= Hooge =

Hooge can refer to:

- Hooge, Prince Su, Manchu prince of the Qing Dynasty
- Houvenkopf Mountain known as "Hooge Kop"
- Hooge, Germany, an island and municipality in northern Germany
- Hooge (Ypres), a village in Belgium, now part of the city of Ypres
  - Hooge in World War I
