= Cora Hartshorn =

American pioneer in the field of birth control

Cora Louise Hartshorn (March 21, 1873 – October 17, 1958) was an American pioneer in the field of birth control. She used her position in the community of Short Hills, New Jersey to form the Short Hills Birth Control Committee and to raise funds for a clinic during 1926–1927. This helped to fund the statewide New Jersey Birth Control League, which opened the Newark Maternal Health Center, New Jersey's first birth control clinic, in 1928. The New Jersey Birth Control League was later renamed the New Jersey League for Planned Parenthood, now Planned Parenthood of Metropolitan New Jersey.

== Early life and education ==
Hartshorn was born to a wealthy family in Short Hills, New Jersey. Her father, Stewart Hartshorn, a protagonist entrepreneur, established himself by acquiring land in the Short Hills region, thus earning recognition as the community's founder. Meanwhile, the protagonist's mother, Joanna Randall Hartshorn, experienced the loss of four pregnancies, leaving her with three surviving children. Witnessing the emotional anguish her mother endured due to these losses, Hartshorn became driven to contribute to the field of birth control. Hartshorn wrote of her mother that "She was one of the early suffragists when suffrage for women was bitterly fought both by men and by many women."

Hartshorn was educated at home until 1887, when she and her family moved to England for a year, then to Paris, where she attended Madame Yearman's School. In 1893 the family returned to Short Hills. Hartshorn never went to college and never married.

== Birth control movement in New Jersey ==
Hartshorn heard Margaret Sanger speak at a large protest rally at Carnegie Hall in January 1917. Sanger had been arrested for opening a birth control clinic in Brooklyn, and was out on bail. Forty years later, Hartshorn described the effect this had on her in an interview. "I had known the devastating effect in families of the lack of contraceptive knowledge and was shocked that our civilized country could imprison people for trying to help these poor women."

Later, when Sanger had been successful in opening the first permanent birth control clinic in New York, she decided to open a clinic in New Jersey, and through a mutual friend, Henrietta Hart, she enlisted the help of Cora Hartshorn. Hartshorn organized the Short Hills Birth Control Committee. In 1926 and 1927, she held "parlor parties" to raise money for the clinic.

Subsequently, a statewide committee formed, called the New Jersey Birth Control League, and it opened the Newark Maternal Health Care Center in 1928. The clinic disseminated birth control information to married women who had at least five children and could not afford their own physician.

Hartshorn also campaigned with Sanger in 1934 for a national Birth Control Bill, legalizing dissemination of birth control information. The bill was never passed. In 1941, the New Jersey Birth Control League was renamed the New Jersey League for Planned Parenthood.

== Death and legacy ==
Hartshorn died on October 17, 1958, at her home in Millburn, New Jersey. She was 85 years old.

During her lifetime, Hartshorn helped develop a flower and bird reservation on a 16.45-acre plot of land donated by her father. It is now the Cora Hartshorn Arboretum and Bird Sanctuary. She also had a substantial collection of early modern American paintings, some of which can be found today at the Newark Museum, including works of Marsden Hartley and Georgia O'Keeffe.
