= New Jersey Sports and Exposition Authority =

State agency of New Jersey, USA

State of New Jersey Sports and Exposition Authority

Agency overview
- Formed: 1971
- Jurisdiction: New Jersey
- Headquarters: One DeKorte Park Plaza, Lyndhurst, NJ
- Agency executives: John Ballantyne, Chairman; Vincent Prieto, President & CEO
- Website: www.njsea.com

The New Jersey Sports and Exposition Authority (NJSEA) is an independent authority established by the State of New Jersey in 1971 to oversee the Meadowlands Sports Complex. Originally consisting of Giants Stadium and the Meadowlands Racetrack in 1976, Meadowlands Arena was added to the complex in 1981 and New Meadowlands Stadium (now MetLife Stadium) replaced Giants Stadium in 2010.

In 2015 the New Jersey Meadowlands Commission was merged into NJSEA by legislative action.

== History ==
=== Sports and exposition facilities ===
Over the years, the NJSEA's purview expanded to include Monmouth Park Racetrack in Oceanport and the Wildwoods Convention Center in Wildwood. In Atlantic City, the Authority oversaw the construction and development of the Convention Center and the renovation of the historic Boardwalk Hall, the long-time home of the Miss America Pageant.

In the 1990s the NJSEA built the New Jersey State Aquarium (now known as the Adventure Aquarium) in Camden. The NJSEA also contributed to the construction of the Meadowlands Environment Center in Lyndhurst, just across Berry's Creek from the Sports Complex.

The NJSEA facilities are home to the New York Giants and Jets, which also serves as major venues for concerts and family shows. Since 1976, NJSEA buildings have hosted many major events, including Super Bowl XLVIII, seven games of the 1994 World Cup, the 1996 Men's Final Four, NFL playoff games and Super Bowl championship celebrations, the 2002 and 2003 NBA Finals, the Stanley Cup Final of 1995, 2000, 2001 and 2003, the 1999 Women's World Cup, many other international soccer matches - including Pelé's farewell game, a 1995 Papal Mass by Pope John Paul II and countless major concerts.

The Meadowlands Racetrack, a leading standardbred racing and simulcasting facility, is home to harness racing's prestigious Hambletonian Stakes and hosts a fall thoroughbred meet.

Historic Monmouth Park is the site of a summer thoroughbred meet highlighted by the Haskell Invitational won in dramatic fashion in 2009 by the filly, Rachel Alexandra.

The NJSEA also operates the Off Track Wagering (OTW) facility, Favorites at Woodbridge, and has received approval to open a second OTW in Bayonne.

The NJSEA also provides in-house security, emergency medical services, and fire protection staff to the entire Meadowlands Sports Complex, including MetLife Stadium, the replacement for Giants Stadium at the Meadowlands Sports Complex built privately by the Jets and Giants, as they have done in the past at Giants Stadium.

The NJSEA owns the land beneath the American Dream Meadowlands shopping complex. It issued $1.15 billion in municipal bonds to support the project.

=== New Jersey Meadowlands Commission merger ===
The New Jersey Meadowlands Commission (formerly the Hackensack Meadowlands Development Commission) was a regional zoning, planning and regulatory agency in northern New Jersey, established by the state in 1969. In 2015 the New Jersey Legislature voted to reorganize the commission to become part of NJSEA. Included in the merger was the Meadowlands Research and Restoration Institute and the Meadowlands Environment Center.

Following the absorption of the Meadowlands Commission, NJSEA has continued the commission's functions of managing land development in the Meadowlands district. In 2020 the agency adopted a revised master plan for the district, focusing on environmental protections and economic development.

== Governance ==
The 16-member Board of Commissioners is appointed by the Governor of New Jersey to four-year terms, subject to confirmation by the New Jersey Senate and it includes three ex officio members: The authority president, the State Treasurer and a designated representative of the New Jersey Meadowlands Commission. The authority holds regularly scheduled meeting which are open to the public. The minutes of all authority meetings are subject to approval by the Governor.

Its first chairman and chief executive officer (CEO) was David A. "Sonny" Werblin. Joe Plumeri, owner of the Trenton Thunder and CEO of Willis Group Holdings, was Commissioner of NJSEA from 1997 to 2004.

In February 2018, it was announced that Vincent Prieto, former Speaker of the New Jersey General Assembly would step down from his post and succeed Wayne Hasenbalg as president and chief executive officer, a position that will pay him a $280,000 annual salary.

== Chief executive officers ==
- Sonny Werblin: 1971–1974
- Jack Krumpe: 1974–1978
- Robert G. Harter: 1978–1978
- Robert Mulcahy: 1978–1998
- Dennis R. Robinson: 1998–1999
- Wayne Hasenbalg: 1999–2018
- Vincent Prieto: 2018–present
