= Meadowlands Environment Center =

Educational facility in New Jersey, United States

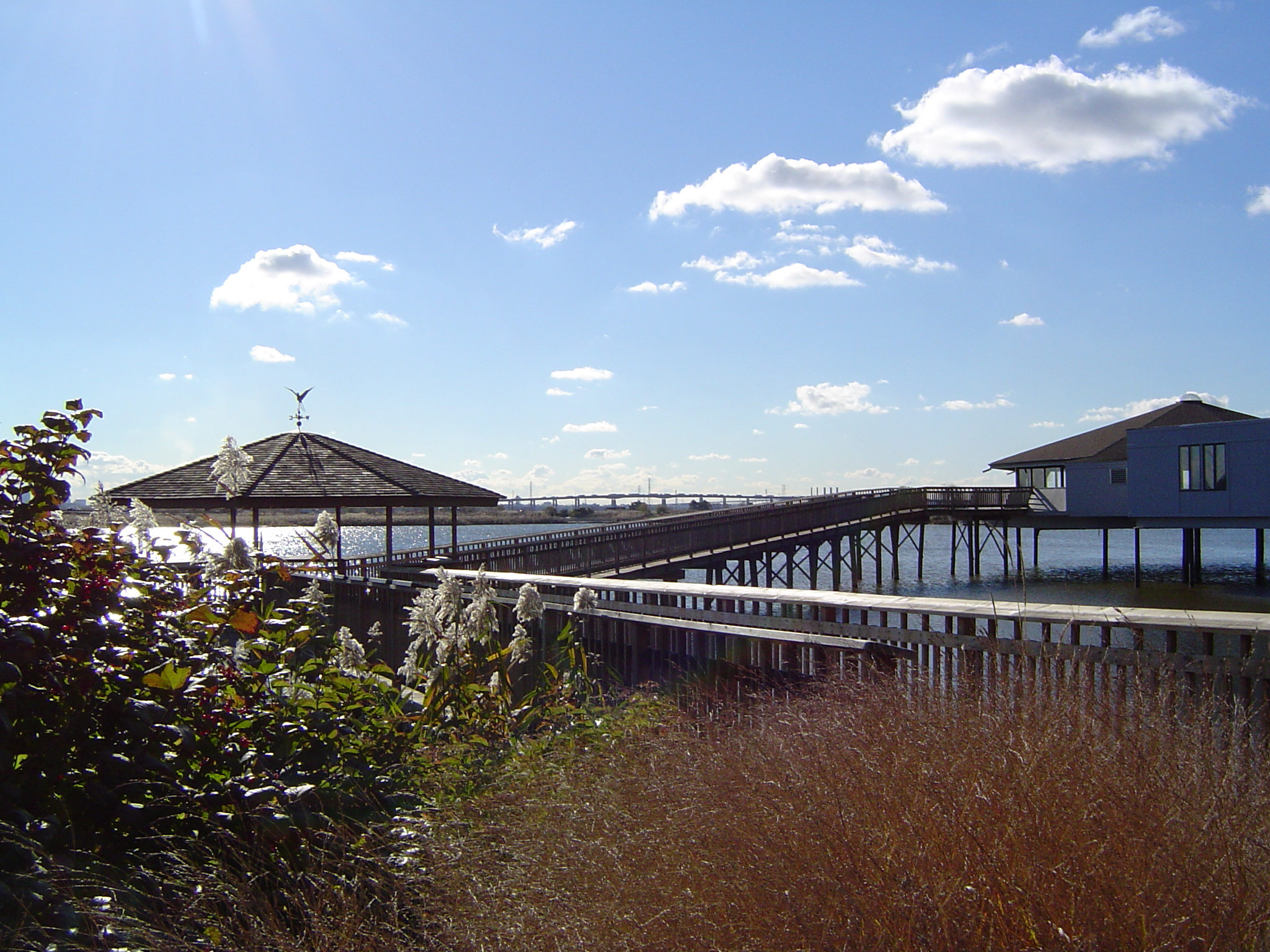
- Interactive map of Meadowlands Environment Center
- Type: educational facility
- Location: 324 Forest Drive South; Lyndhurst, NJ, USA
- Coordinates: 40°47′6″N 74°6′12″W
- Website: Meadowlands Environment Center

The Meadowlands Environment Center (formerly the Hackensack Meadowlands Environmental Center) is an educational facility in the New Jersey Meadowlands in Lyndhurst, New Jersey, located along the Hackensack River. It is operated by Ramapo College of New Jersey under the auspices of the New Jersey Sports and Exposition Authority (NJSEA).

In 2003 Ramapo College began working with the Meadowlands Environmental Center to develop an environmental education program, and as of 2024 the college operates the facility.

The center facilities include the Center for Environmental and Scientific Education, and the William D. McDowell Observatory. The center is located within Richard W. DeKorte Park, named after Richard W. DeKorte, a resident of Franklin Lakes, New Jersey, who as majority leader of the New Jersey General Assembly sponsored legislation that established the New Jersey Meadowlands Commission in 1969.

Until 2015 the Hackensack Meadowlands Environmental Center was operated by the Meadowlands Commission. In 2015 legislation was enacted that reorganized the commission, placing it within the NJSEA.

== See also ==
- Environmental education in the United States
- Hackensack River Greenway
