= Cora Hartshorn Arboretum and Bird Sanctuary =

Institution in Millburn, New Jersey, US

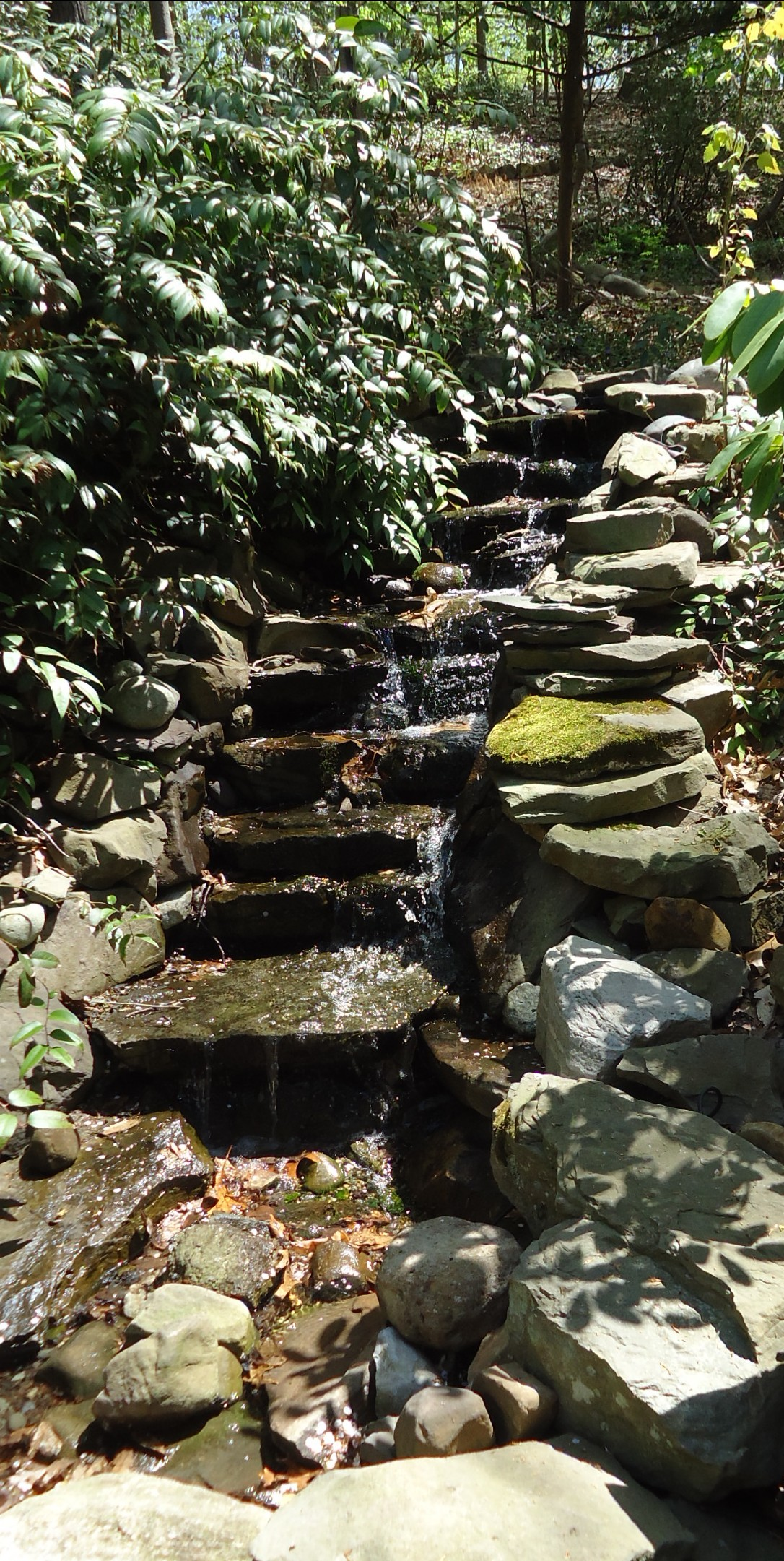
- Waterfall garden at the Hartshorn Arboretum
- Interactive map of Cora Hartshorn Arboretum and Bird Sanctuary
- Type: arboretum and bird sanctuary
- Location: 324 Forest Drive South; Short Hills, NJ, United States
- Coordinates: 40°43′30″N 74°19′41″W
- Area: 16.5 acres (6.7 ha)
- Website: hartshornarboretum.org

The Cora Hartshorn Arboretum and Bird Sanctuary (16.5 acres), also known as the Hartshorn Arboretum, is an arboretum and bird sanctuary located at 324 Forest Drive South, in the Short Hills section of Millburn, in Essex County, New Jersey, United States. Its trails are open to the public from dawn to dusk without charge. Various programs are also offered for children, families, and adults.

== The grounds ==
The arboretum began when the 16.5 acres of land was gifted to Cora Hartshorn in 1923 by Stewart Hartshorn on undeveloped woodland of oaks, tulip trees, dogwood, and beech. She designed a system of roads and walking paths; by 1938 there were 3 miles (4.8 km) of paths. In 1958, Cora died, and she willed the arboretum to the township.

The arboretum contains 45 species of trees, including 275-year-old tulip trees, as well as rare ferns, over 150 species of wildflowers, and 100 species of birds and represents a critical habitat for plants and wildlife.

== The Stone House ==
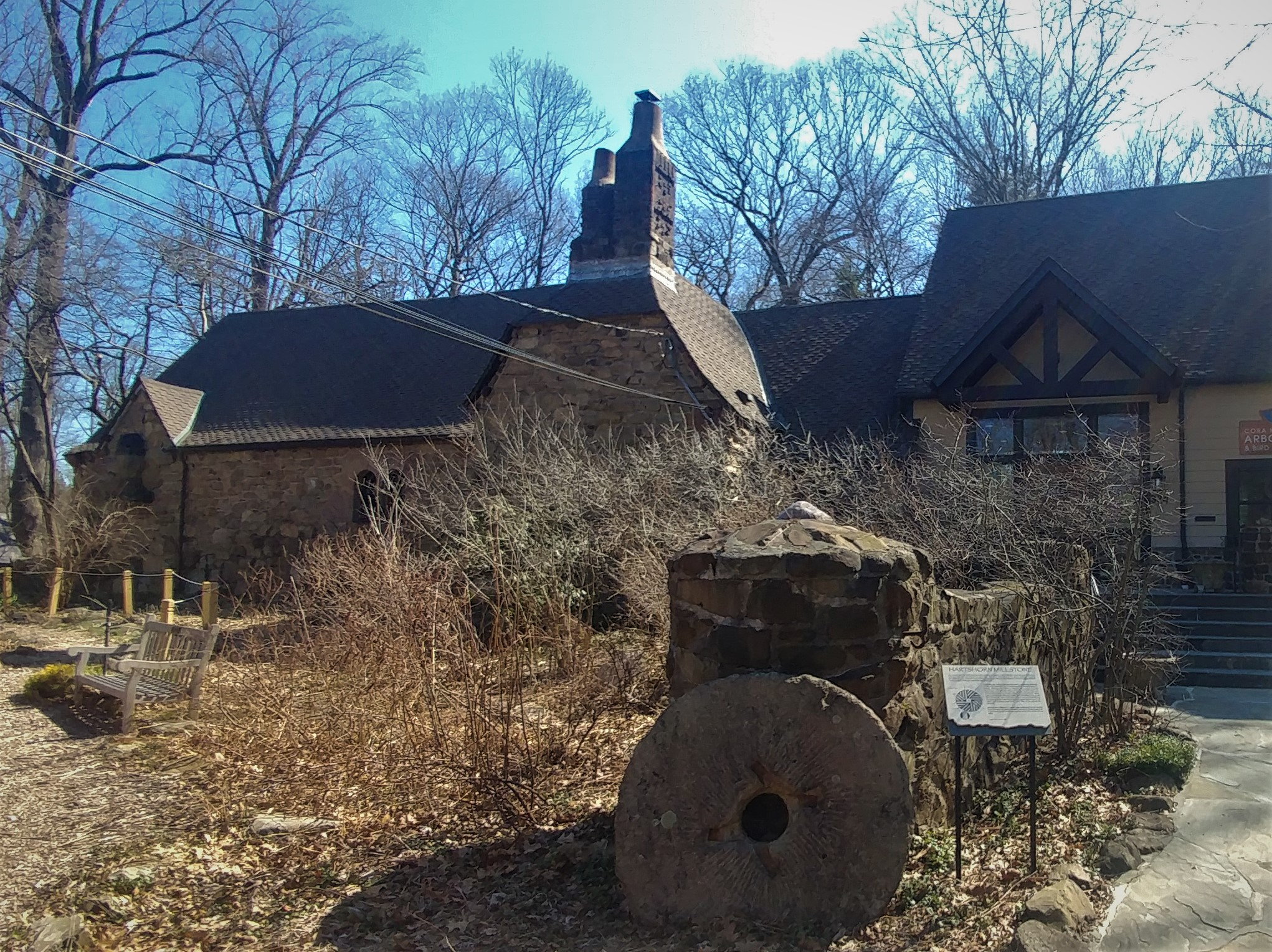
The Stone House

The original part of the building, also known as the Stone House, was built in 1933 for Cora. All the stones in the Stone House are from Stewart Hartshorn's local quarry in nearby Springfield, New Jersey. Around 1970, an addition to the Stone House was added as there was a need for more office space.

In 2007, the Stone House underwent renovations. The previous addition was removed and replaced with a reception area, bird observatory, additional office space, a basement, and an upstairs meeting room. The Stone House also received a kitchen space.

=== Animals ===
The Stone House is home to a variety of animals, including reptiles such as Eastern rat snakes, corn snakes, Eastern box turtles, painted turtles, and an Eastern king snake. Mammals housed are domestic rabbits. There is also a leopard gecko and a Chilean rose-haired tarantula.

== Membership ==
Access to the trails is free. Visitors or interested parties can sign up for membership. Membership dues provide crucial support for education programs and maintenance of the woodlands. The CHA offers a variety of programs and events for children, families, and adults. These include hikes, camping trips, and classes for children.

== See also ==
- List of botanical gardens in the United States
