= Presby Memorial Iris Gardens =

Historic house in New Jersey, United States

- Presby Memorial Iris Gardens Horticultural Center
- U.S. National Register of Historic Places
- New Jersey Register of Historic Places
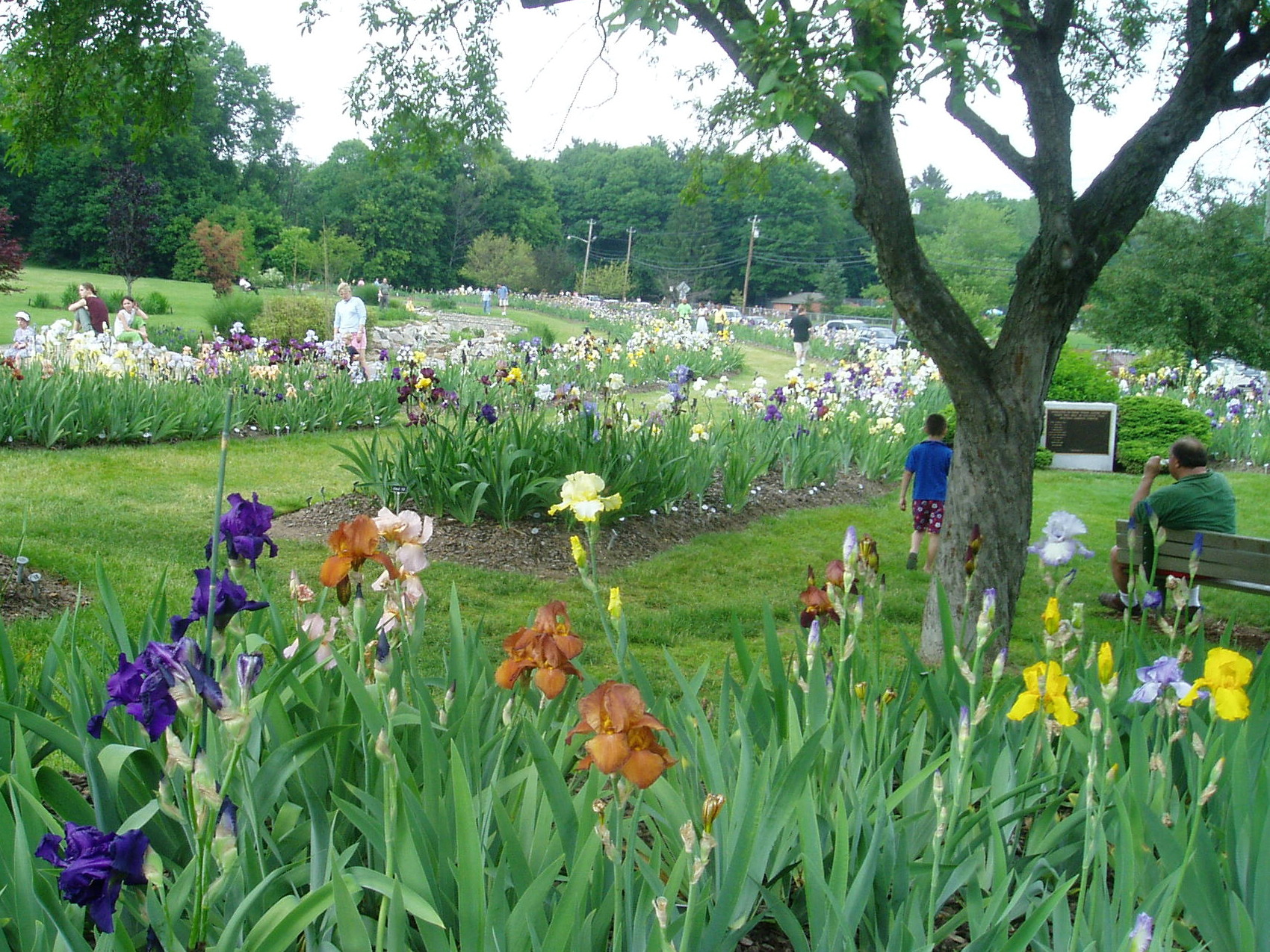
- Presby Memorial Iris Gardens

- Location within Essex County, New Jersey Location within New Jersey Location within the United States
- Location: 474 Upper Mountain Avenue, Montclair, New Jersey
- Coordinates: 40°51′5″N 74°12′23″W
- Area: 7.8 acres (3.2 ha)
- Built: 1922
- Architect: John Wister
- Architectural style: Second Empire
- NRHP reference No.: 80002483
- NJRHP No.: 1171

Significant dates
- Added to NRHP: September 17, 1980
- Designated NJRHP: June 25, 1980

Presby Memorial Iris Gardens is a nonprofit, living museum specializing in iris flowers, located at 474 Upper Mountain Avenue, Montclair in Essex County, New Jersey, New Jersey, United States. The gardens are situated on 6.5 acres. Adjacent to the gardens is a Victorian house, the Walther House. The house is open to the public the hours are limited, the entrance has a seven step staircase and is home to a museum shop and headquarters for the Citizens Committee that oversees the gardens.

Following financial problems in 2008 and 2009, ownership of the gardens was transferred to Essex county, who bought the Walther House for $1.1 million in order to give the gardens a better financial standing. The county then leased the gardens back to the Presby Memorial Iris Gardens for $1. While Essex County owns the property, the actual iris beds are maintained without taxpayer funds. Rather, they are maintained by private donations.

== Description ==
The Gardens are in a park-like setting and open to the public without charge. Donations, however, are greatly appreciated. Each year Presby has over 10,000 visitors. Normally, the blooming season is May 14 to June 4. Check the Presby website (see External Links below) for the exact status of the current season.

The gardens were established in 1927 to honor Frank Presby, a noted horticulturalist and a founding member of the American Iris Society. This world-class collection now includes approximately 10,000 individual plants, representing 6 species and over 3,000 different named varieties of irises. It is the largest non-commercial garden dedicated to irises in the world.

== See also ==
- Iris (plant)
- List of botanical gardens in the United States
- National Register of Historic Places listings in Essex County, New Jersey
