= New Jersey Meadowlands Commission =

Former government agency in New Jersey, United States

- Former logo of New Jersey Meadowlands Commission

Agency overview
- Formed: 1969, consolidated in 2015
- Jurisdiction: New Jersey Meadowlands
- Headquarters: One DeKorte Park Plaza, Lyndhurst, NJ 07071
- Agency executives: Michael Ferguson, Chairman; Wayne Hasenbalg, President and CEO
- Website: http://www.njsea.com

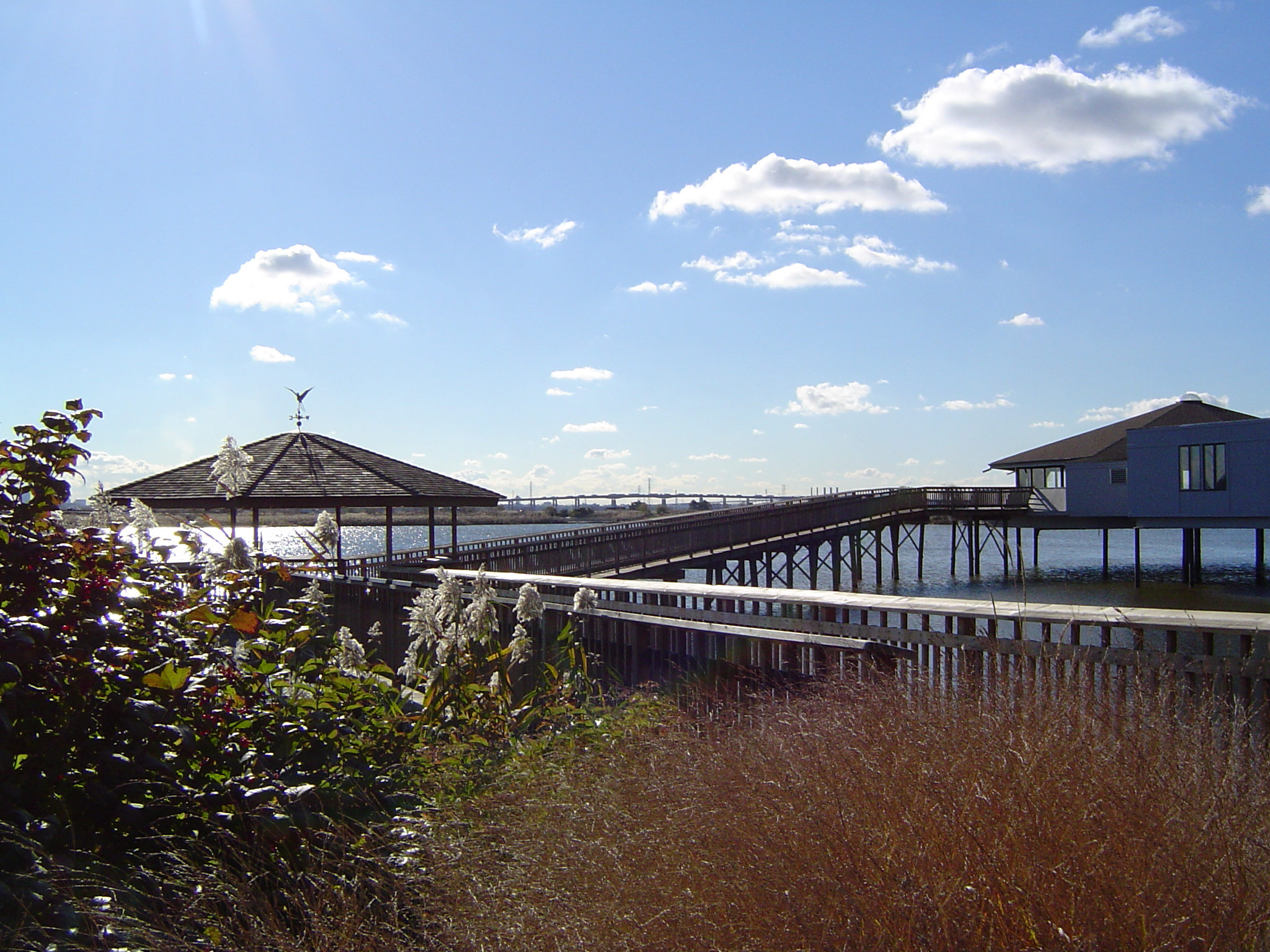
NJMC Headquarters

The New Jersey Meadowlands Commission (NJMC; formerly the Hackensack Meadowlands Development Commission) was a regional zoning, planning and regulatory agency in northern New Jersey. Its founding mandates were to protect the delicate balance of nature, provide for orderly development, and manage solid waste activities in the New Jersey Meadowlands District. The Commission operated as an independent state agency between 1969 and 2015, loosely affiliated with the New Jersey Department of Community Affairs. In 2015 NJMC was merged with the New Jersey Sports and Exposition Authority (NJSEA) through legislative action.

== Establishment ==
The Meadowlands Commission was established by an Act of the New Jersey Legislature in 1969, sponsored in the New Jersey Senate by Fairleigh S. Dickinson Jr. The merger with NJSEA was made effective in February 2015.

== Geographic jurisdiction ==
The Meadowlands District is composed of 19,730 acres (79.8 km^{2}), approximately 31 mi^{2}, of 14 municipalities in Bergen and Hudson counties. They are: Carlstadt, East Rutherford, Little Ferry, Lyndhurst, Moonachie, North Arlington, Ridgefield, Rutherford, South Hackensack, and Teterboro in Bergen County; and Jersey City, Kearny, North Bergen, and Secaucus in Hudson County.

The Meadowlands District stretches mainly along the delta of the Hackensack and Passaic Rivers as they flow into Newark Bay; tributaries of the Hackensack include Berrys Creek and Overpeck Creek. The District is bordered by U.S. Route 46 on the north, Routes U.S. Route 1/9 (Tonnelle Avenue) and the freight rail line owned by Norfolk Southern Railway and CSX Transportation Corp. (the former Conrail main line) on the east, the Port Authority Trans-Hudson (PATH) commuter rail lines and Pulaski Skyway on the south, and Route 17, the Pascack Valley Line, and the Kingsland rail line on the west.

== Program history ==
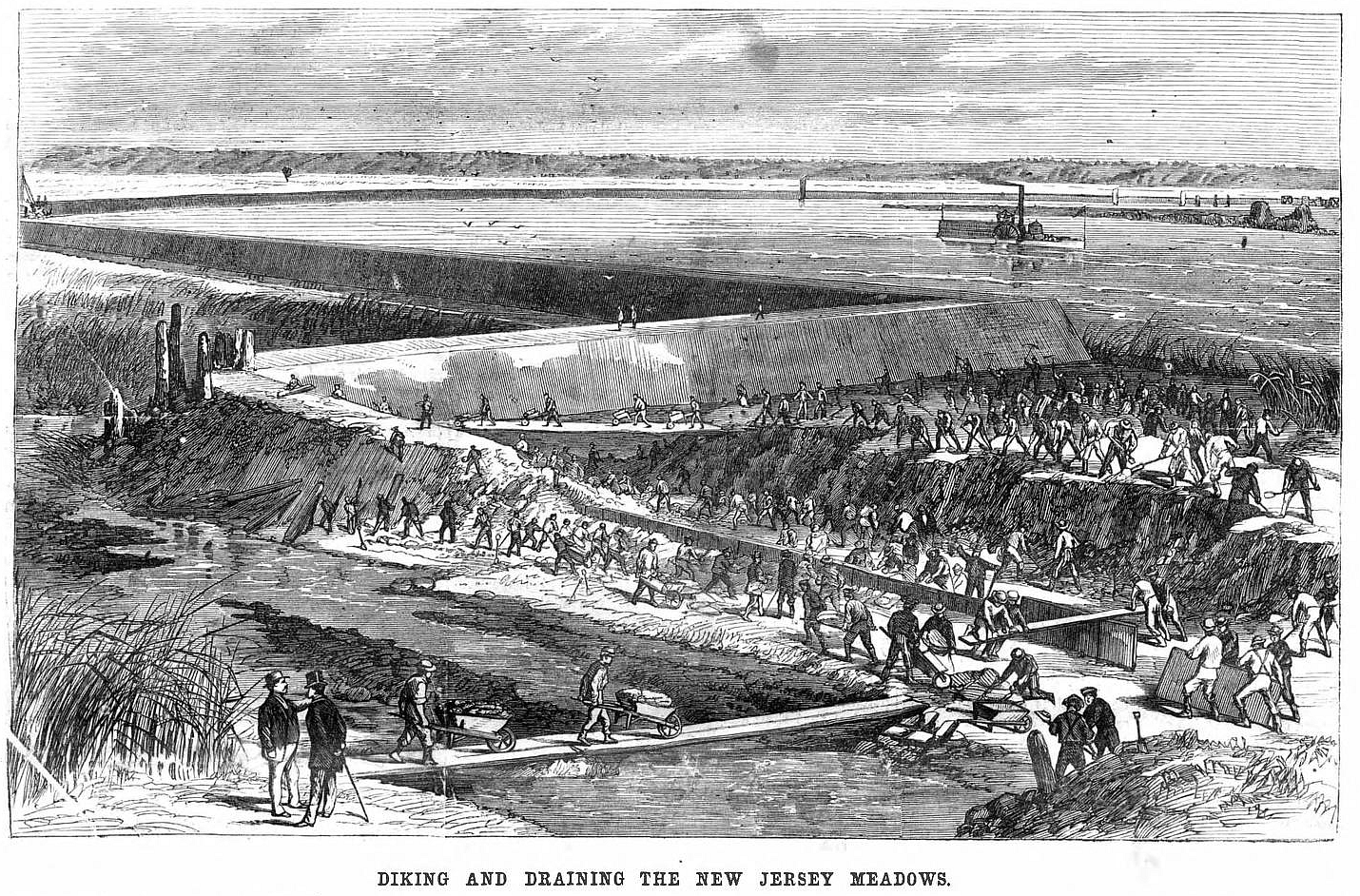
Filling wetlands in the mid-19th century

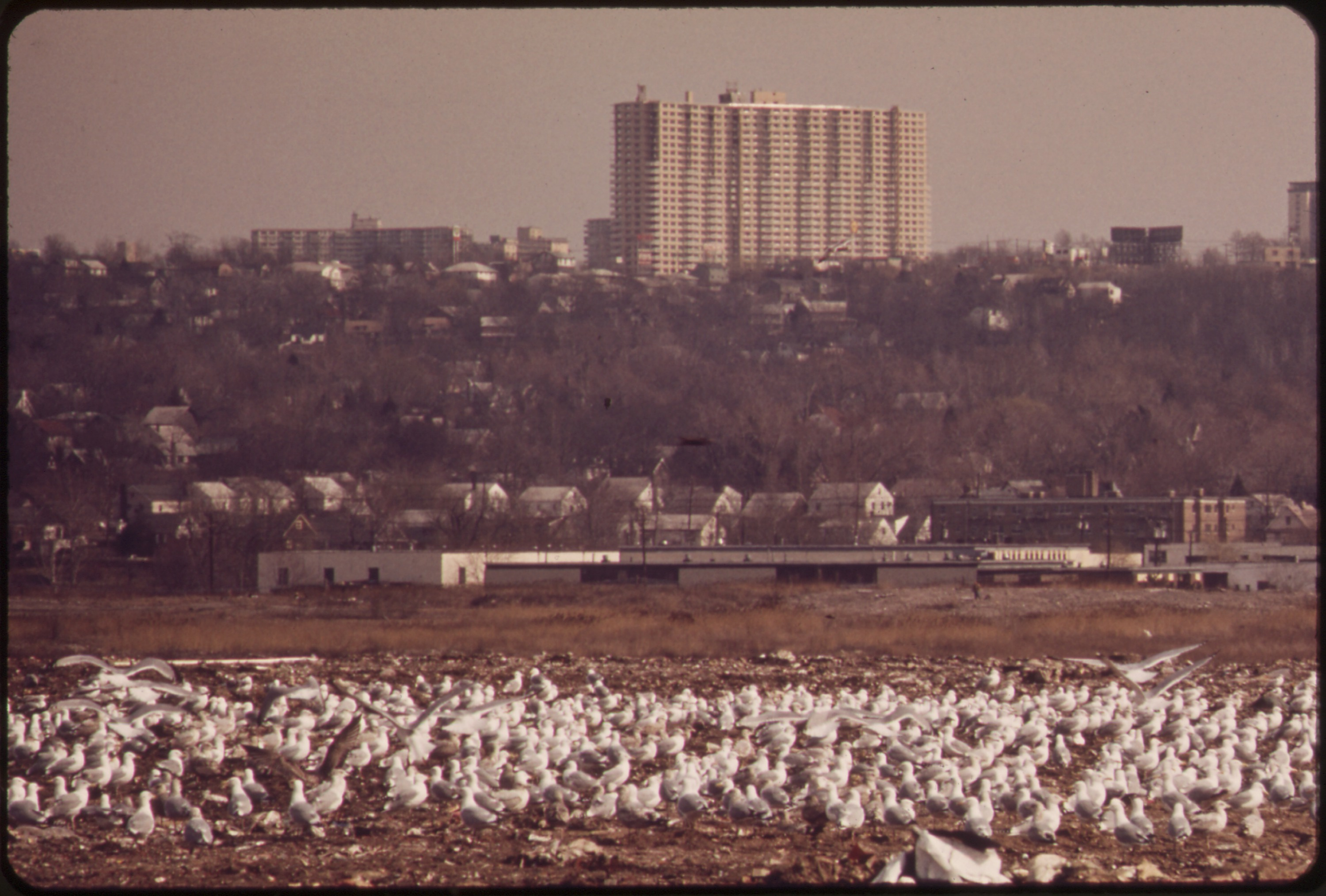
A landfill in the Meadowlands in 1973

Prior to the establishment of the NJMC, the Meadowlands region was viewed as a dumping ground, and the Hackensack River and its marshes were often seen as places to fill for commercial and industrial development.

Through cooperation with environmentalists, businesses, mayors, state and federal agencies, the NJMC authored a new Master Plan for the Meadowlands District in 2004 to target development to brownfield and greyfield sites, revitalizing formerly blighted areas into places of economic and community growth and preserving 8,400 acres (34 km^{2}) of wetlands and open space. The new Master Plan anticipates a market value of $5.6 billion and the creation of 56,250 new permanent jobs in the Meadowlands District through the Secaucus Transit Village, Belleville Turnpike Redevelopment Area, and other redevelopment projects.

Following the Master Plan's adoption, the NJMC focused its goals into four policy areas: improving environmental stewardship, fostering economic success with an eye on business growth, aiding municipalities, and expanding special services, educational and cultural programs. These policies are backed by MAGNET (Meadowlands Area Grants for Natural and Economic Transformation), a five-year, $32 million funding plan.

All but one landfill in the Meadowlands district have been permanently closed.

In 2006, milestones for the NJMC included plans to bring 20 megawatts of renewable energy (solar, tidal, geothermal, etc.) to the Meadowlands District by the year 2020, the establishment of green building guidelines to encourage environmentally friendly development, endorsement of the Kyoto Protocol to lower greenhouse gas emissions, and the release of "Birding and Wildlife Trails: Meadowlands and More," a free, 72-page color guide encouraging visitors to enjoy eco-tourism activities in the region including birding, catch-and-release fishing, hiking, canoeing, and pontoon boat cruises offered in the summer.

The NJMC also advanced the sharing of services between the 14 Meadowlands municipalities to lighten the municipalities’ individual tax burdens. The agency has established a municipal equipment pool, offered financial and technical assistance with New Jersey Council on Affordable Housing (COAH) planning, and allocated $1 million to investigate additional shared services programs. The agency is also leading regional efforts to improve stormwater management and create a comprehensive transportation plan for the Meadowlands District.

== Environmental research ==
In order to support its land use management and other policies with scientific data, the NJMC established the Meadowlands Environmental Research Institute (MERI). MERI has placed comprehensive air and water quality monitoring systems throughout the Meadowlands District, and has developed geographic information system digital mapping technology for the Meadowlands municipalities. MERI functions as a center for scientific investigations of the urban wetlands, their functioning, restoration, and sustainable management.

As reorganized under NJSEA, the research facility is called the Meadowlands Research and Restoration Institute.

== Land protections in the district ==
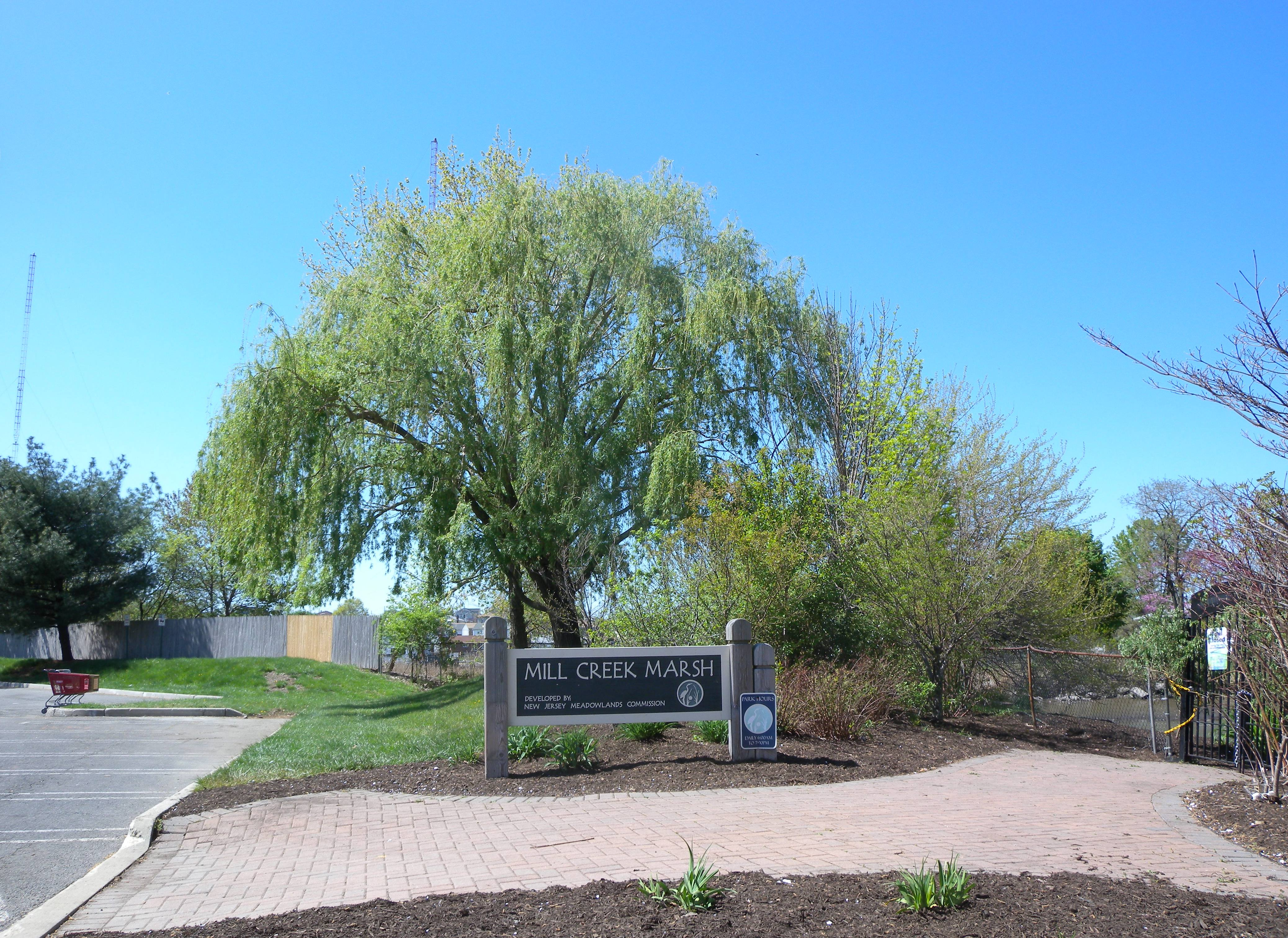
Entrance gate at the Mill Creek Marsh Trail

The NJMC has acquired more than 1,800 acres (7 km^{2}) of the remaining wetlands in the Meadowlands District for preservation and enhancement. The Skeetkill Creek Marsh in Ridgefield, Harrier Meadow in North Arlington, and Mill Creek Marsh in Secaucus have been restored or enhanced through the agency's efforts. Goals of restorations include increased tidal flow, the reduction of phragmites, and greater use of the site by estuarine species of fish, waterfowl, and shorebirds.

According to a report by the New Jersey Audubon Society, the Meadowlands is a major part of the Atlantic Flyway migration route. Two hundred and sixty five species of birds including great and snowy egrets, tree swallow, peregrine falcon, osprey, black-crowned night heron, ruddy duck, red-tailed hawk, double-crested cormorant, and American bald eagle have been spotted in the Meadowlands.

Many of these species can be seen from the 100 acres (0.4 km^{2}) of park lands and eight miles (13 km) of trails that have been constructed by the NJMC for public access, environmental education, conservation and enhancement. These parks include Richard W. DeKorte Park in Lyndhurst, home to a butterfly garden, World Trade Center Memorial, overlook of New York City, several trails, the NJSEA Meadowlands Environment Center, an educational facility, and the William D. McDowell Observatory.

Other parks in the region include Laurel Hill County Park in Secaucus, Kearny Marsh in Kearny, River Barge Park and Marina in Carlstadt and the Steven R. Rothman Overlook and Preserve at the Richard P. Kane Natural Area.
