= Houvenkopf Mountain =

Mountain in New Jersey, United States

Highest point
- Elevation: 931 ft (284 m) NGVD 29
- Coordinates: 41°06′21″N 74°10′31″W

Geography
- Location: Bergen County, New Jersey, U.S.
- Parent range: Ramapo Mountains
- Topo map: USGS Ramsey

Climbing
- Easiest route: Hike

Houvenkopf or Hovenkopf Mountain is a mountain in Bergen County, New Jersey. It extends into New York, where it forms the western side of the southern entrance to Ramapo Pass. The major peak on the New Jersey side rises to 931 feet (284 m) and is known as Stag Hill. It is separated by a deep saddle from the major peak on the New York side known as the Hooge Kop proper, which rises to about 770 feet (230 m). Houvenkopf Mountain is located in Mahwah, New Jersey and overlooks Hillburn to the north, Suffern to the east, and Ringwood, New Jersey to the west. It is part of the Ramapo Mountains.

== History ==
Houvenkopf Mountain's name is derived from the Dutch "Hooge Kop," meaning "High Head." Its summit was known as Split Rock or Pigeon Rock, because locals used to spread grain around the summit boulders to catch passenger pigeons.

The mountain was the subject of the poem titled "Mount Houvenkopf" by Joyce Kilmer, written in 1918.

Parts of the mountain are publicly accessible as part of the Ramapo Valley County Reservation.
