= Timeline of 20th-century printmaking in America =

This is a timeline of 20th-century printmaking in America.

== 20th century ==
=== 1900s ===
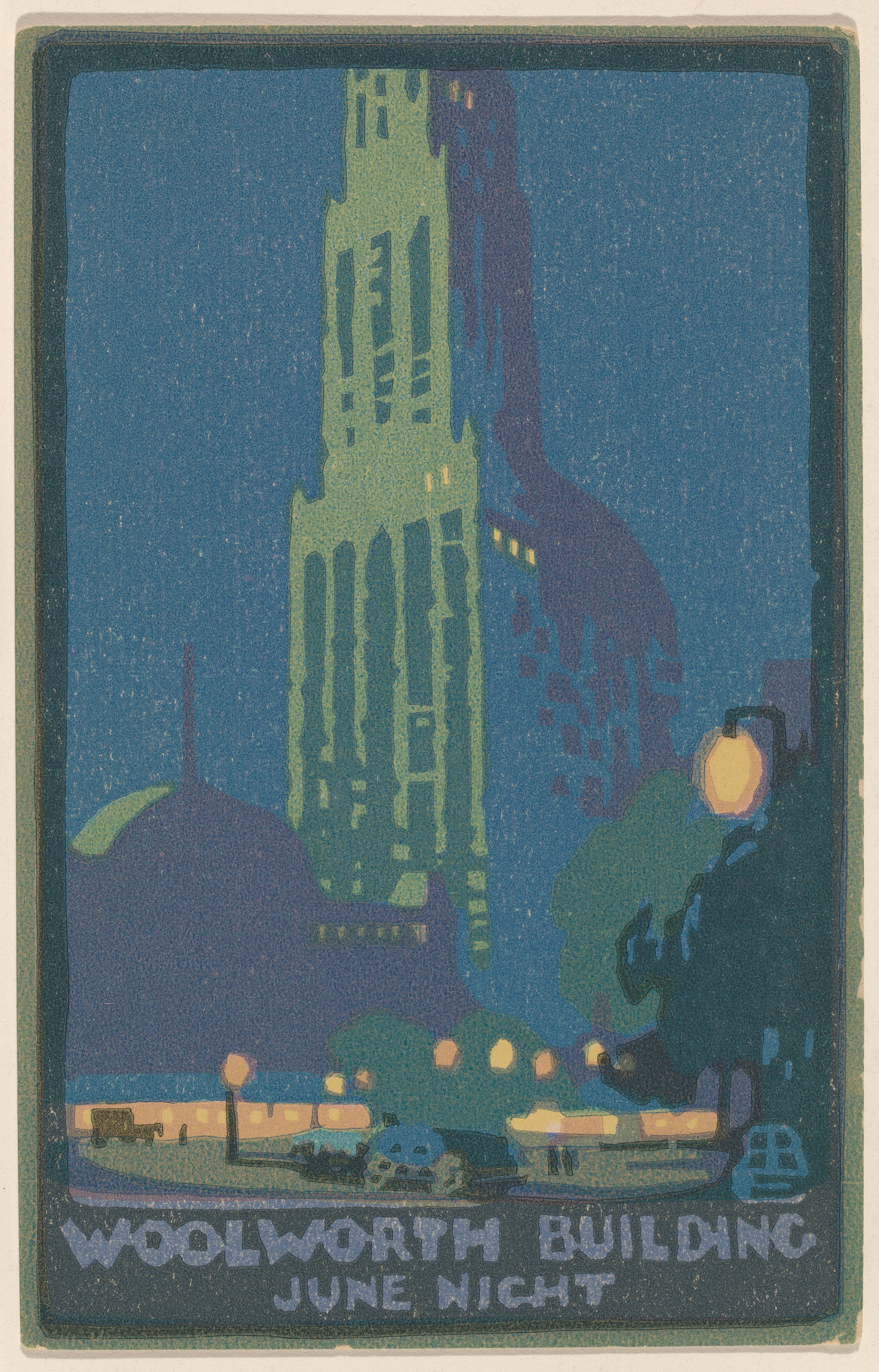
Rachael Robinson Elmer Woolworth Building June Night, 1916

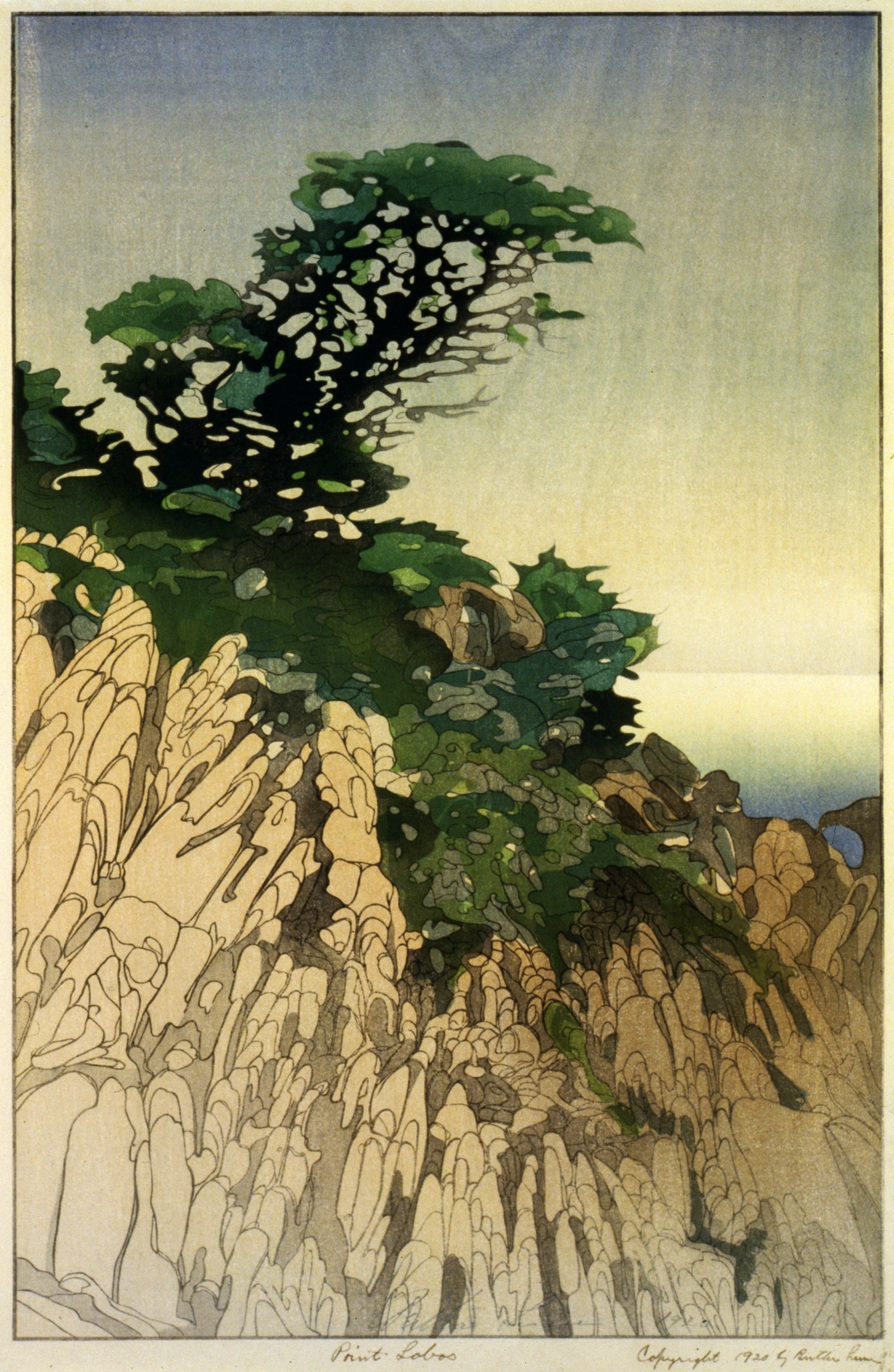
Bertha Lum, Point Lobos, 1920

- 1907 – Bertha Lum traveled to Japan to learn woodblock cutting.
- 1907 – Samuel Simon, an Englishman, held the earliest recorded patent for a silkscreen process; his process used a bristle brush rather than squeegee to distribute the color.

=== 1910s ===
- 1910 – Chicago Society of Etchers was established, the country's first organization of etchers. The group promoted etching through traveling exhibitions around the country and hosting annual exhibitions at the Art Institute of Chicago until the Society's demise in 1972.
- 1912 – Pedro Joseph de Lemos established the California Society of Etchers (now the California Society of Printmakers).
- 1914 – A San Francisco-based commercial artist, John Pilsworth, perfected and patented a multicolor screen process, called the Selectasine method, leading to wide use of the screen print in the advertising industry.
- 1915 – A small group of printmakers, including Blanche Lazzell, formed the Provincetown Printers, a "pioneering woodblock print society – the first of its kind in America". The group developed a new form of woodblock printmaking known as the Provincetown print or white-line woodcut. Other members: Ada Gilmore, Mildred McMillen, Ethel Mars, Maud Squire.
- 1915 - The Brooklyn Society of Etchers, later to be re-named in 1931 the Society of American Etchers, Inc. then again in 1947 to the Society of Etchers, Gravers, Lithographers, and Woodcutters, Inc. is now known as Society of American Graphic Artists and was formed in New York City with the mission to give artists complete esthetic freedom for the artists; the integrity of personal vision.
- 1915 – The Print Club of Philadelphia, later to be re-named The Print Center, was founded in Philadelphia. It was one of the first venues in the country focused solely on the appreciation of prints. In 1942 The Print Center donated its collection of prints to the Philadelphia Museum of Art. This donation became the heart of the museum's new department of prints.
- 1917 – George Miller set up a lithography print shop for fine artists in New York.
- 1919 – Bolton Brown established a lithography print shop for fine artists in New York.

=== 1920s ===
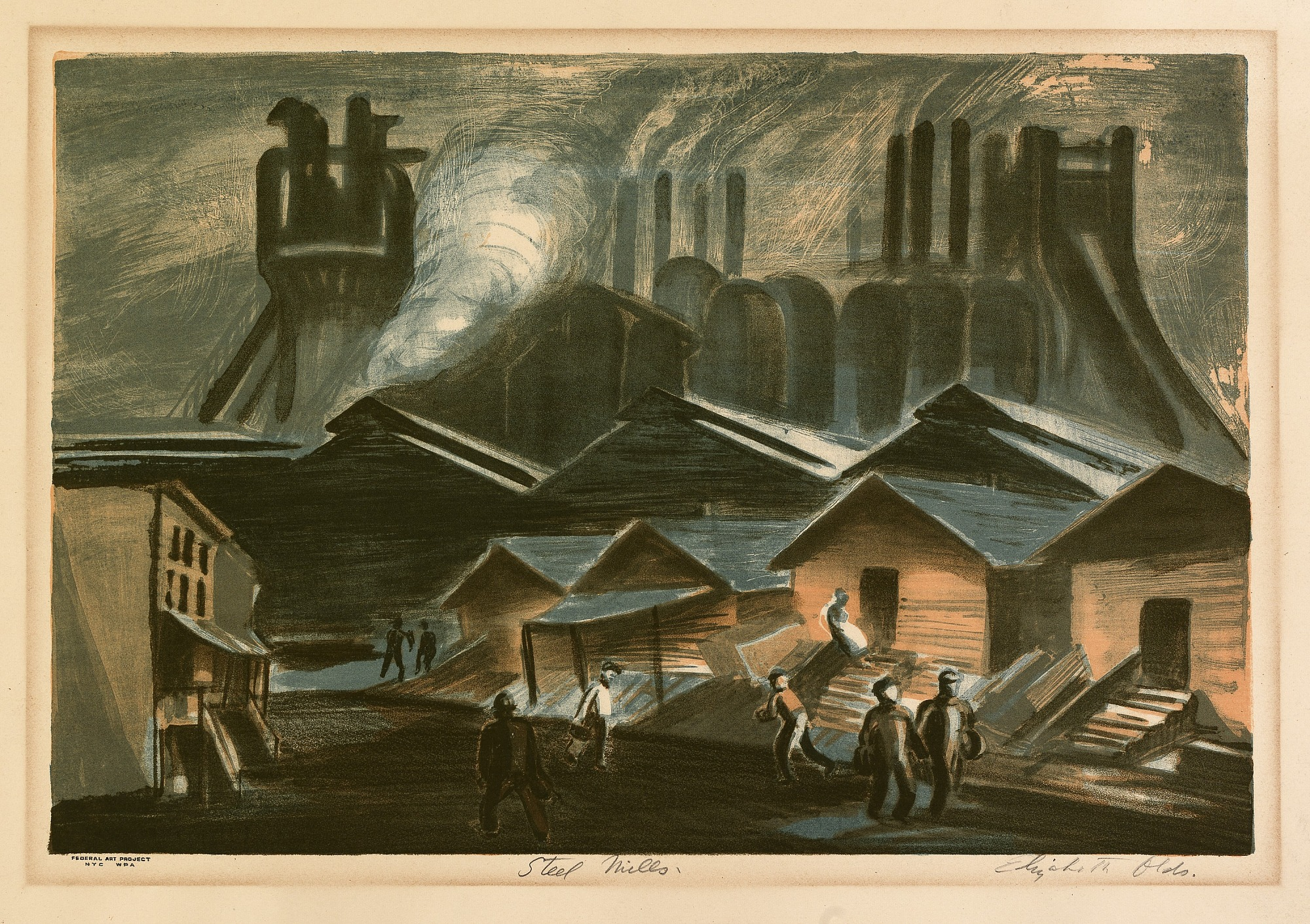
Elizabeth Olds Steel Mills, 1938

- 1922 – The Art Students League of New York established a lithography workshop, led by Joseph Pennell. In response to growing demand, the League hired a full-time professional printer seven years later.
- 1923 – Louis Lozowick, a Ukraine-born master lithographer and "virtuosic precisionist", whose prints are in the collections of many museums and who often celebrated the American city in stylized cityscapes, created his first recorded lithographs (Cleveland and Chicago).
- 1927 – Elizabeth Olds became the first woman artist to receive a Guggenheim Fellowship, and was later a silkscreen pioneer on the WPA/FAP Graphic Arts Division team (1936–40). She was also the first artist to actually create a serigraph, The Concert, while on the Silkscreen Unit.
- 1927 – The Society of American Printmakers was organized and began to offer shows that included prints in different media. In the late 1930s, it organized annual exhibitions.
- 1929 – Founding of The Colophon: A Book Collectors' Quarterly, which published issues during the 1930's and 1940's related to original printmaking and the book arts. Many issues included an original woodcut, lithograph, linocut, or etching that the publishers had commissioned.

=== 1930s ===
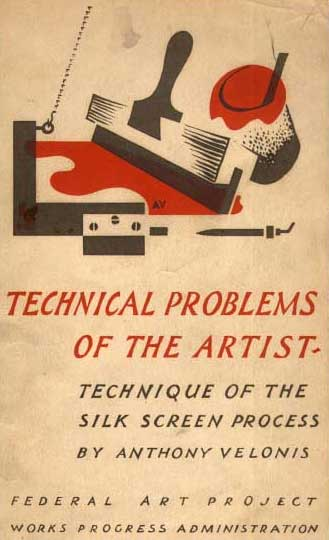
Anthony Velonis Technical Problems of the Artist 1938

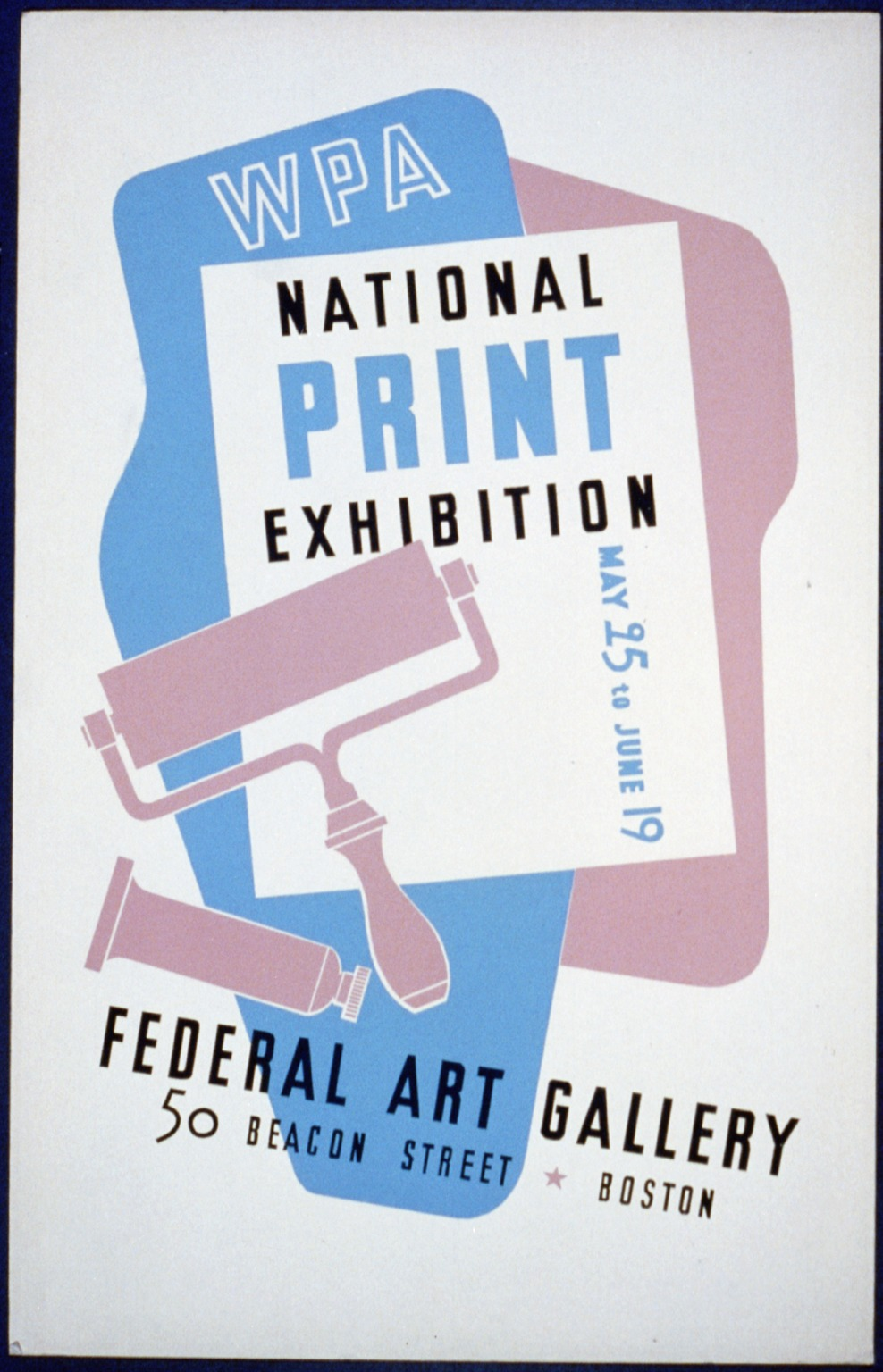
National print exhibition, Federal Art Gallery

- 1931 – Buffalo Print Club, with guidance from Kevin B. O'Callahan, was established this year, then hosted annual exhibitions through 1962, when it closed.
- 1933 – American printmaker Adolf Dehn set up the Adolf Dehn Print Club. For $5 annually subscribers got a brochure illustrating four of his lithos and could choose one to be mailed. His works were "visually sophisticated and mordantly witty but rarely politically challenging" and his skills were widely admired. The club had enough sales that he continued for several years.
- 1934 – Associated American Artists (AAA) was established by Reeves Lewenthal, and operated until 2000. In founding AAA he pioneered the mass merchandizing of prints, helping elevate them to a popular form of original art".
- 1935 – The Federal Art Project (FAP) was established, running until 1943.
- 1935 – 1935 New York anti-lynching exhibitions included lithographs alongside drawings, paintings and sculptures.
- 1936 – Audrey McMahon, a regional director for the Works Progress Administration's (WPA) Federal Art Project and an effective leader, oversaw the development of a printmaking workshop in New York City with a goal of stimulating experimentation and encouraging artists new to the process
- 1936 – WPA Federal Art Project (FAP) New York City Graphic Arts Division workshop opened, one of its sixteen printmaking facilities around the country, with professional printmakers on staff making it possible for artists to experiment with technically demanding methods beyond the artists' existing skills.
- 1936 – Printmaker Harry Sternberg awarded a Guggenheim Fellowship for a project focusing on industrial subjects, traveling several times to Pennsylvania coal mining areas to study mining and meet miners.
- 1937 – Augusta Savage, a sculptor and influential teacher associated with the Harlem Renaissance, became the first director of the Harlem Community Art Center (part of the Federal Art Project). The Center became the "heart of the Harlem Renaissance as a learning and meeting place for the first generation of modern African-American artists."
- 1937 – African-American master printmaker and painter Dox Thrash joined the Fine Print Workshop of the Philadelphia Federal Art Project (of the WPA); He was the first African-American to join the workshop. Thrash co-discovered with Hugh Mesibov and Michael Gallagher the innovative Carborundum printmaking process, in which an artist grinds carborundum into a copper plate before inking it; the process "produced a wide range of rich tones and smoothly modeled forms".
- 1938 – An exhibit of about thirty carborundum prints by Dox Thrash and his WPA associates was held in New Techniques in WPA Graphic Arts at the National Museum of Natural History, Washington, D.C.; at that time it was the most extensive display of new work produced by WPA printmakers.
- 1938 – First one-person show of silkscreen prints, Guy Maccoy – artist, sponsored by the Contemporary Arts Gallery, New York
- 1938 – Anthony Velonis, an experimental silkscreen pioneer and Federal Art Project team leader, encouraged the FAP to start a silkscreen project, which increased recognition of silkscreen as an art form. Also in that year Velonis wrote an important and influential pamphlet for artists, entitled "Technical Problems of the Artist: Technique of the Silkscreen Process".
- 1938 – The FAP Graphic Arts Division team that reinvigorated screen printing processes and pioneered new screen-printing technologies under the leadership of Anthony Velonis included Harry Gottlieb, Louis Lozowick, Eugene Morley, Elizabeth Olds, and Hyman J. Warsager.
- 1938–1939 – Louise Bourgeois, the French-American sculptor, painter, and printmaker made her first print, St. Germain, a holiday greeting card, in offset lithography. Bourgeois made additional cards in the 1940s. She purchased a small intaglio press to work on prints at her home.
- 1940 – By this year lithography had strongly surpassed etching in popularity as a printmaking process. Many artists and viewers were fascinated by the power and subtlety of B&W lithography.
- 1940 – Second one-person show of silkscreen prints, Harry Gottlieb – artist, sponsored by ACA (American Contemporary Art) Gallery
- 1940 – First group show of silkscreen prints. It was organized by Elizabeth McCausland, who was an art critic, historian, and writer, at the Springfield (MA) Art Museum.
- 1940 – The term 'serigraphy' was coined by Carl Zigrosser and Anthony Velonis, derived from the Latin word 'seri', meaning silk, and Greek word 'graphos', meaning to draw or write. They conceived of and promoted the term to draw a distinction between art prints and the commercial and industrial screen-processed images that were produced on a mass scale.
- 1940 – Stanley William Hayter, fled Paris and moved his experimental print workshop, Atelier 17, to New York for the duration of World War II. Atelier 17 closed in 1955.
- 1940 – National Serigraph Society founded. The group's original name was the Silk Screen Group until 1944. The Society's goal was to advance the interests of the new technique of serigraphy. The group conducted classes, ran a worldwide exhibition and information service, and provided a nation-wide lecture bureau and an exhibition and sales gallery in New York City.
- 1940 – The Museum of Modern Art held two exhibits, American Color Prints Under $10. The purpose was to make American art available for purchase to a wide audience, to make ownership of prints by living artists and artisans practical in homes, offices, churches and social groups. The shows were so successful that a third exhibition and sale of color prints was held in 1941.
- 1944 – Jackson Pollock went to Atelier 17 where in his etchings, using automatism, he created powerful and expressive prints that characterized an early form of American Abstract expressionism, with Picasso-derived elements from pre-war compositions.
- 1946 – Louise Bourgeois began making prints at Stanley William Hayter's Atelier 17, a leading printmaking workshop and studio in New York (previously in Paris). The following year she created a print project, her illustrated book called He Disappeared into Complete Silence, which included nine engravings, each accompanied by a parable written by the artist. She was fascinated by skyscrapers upon arrival in New York from Paris; the imagery in her project was mainly of these buildings.
- 1947 – Robert Blackburn, an African-American printmaker and highly regarded teacher, established the Printmaking Workshop in a Chelsea loft in New York City. Blackburn was a renowned master printer for Charles White, Faith Ringgold, Jasper Johns, Robert Rauschenberg, and Betye Saar.

=== 1950s ===
- 1951–1952 – Will Barnet experimented with multi-stone color lithographs in collaboration with Robert Blackburn at the latter's New York City workshop.
- 1956 – The Print Council of America was established.
- 1956 – The Pratt Graphics Center was established in New York City to be a stimulating experimental and international workshop at which students and artists would be welcome in an urban setting. It closed in 1986.
- 1957 – Tatyana Grosman established the Universal Limited Art Editions (ULAE) on Long Island. The first publication was Stones by Larry Rivers and Frank O'Hara. ULAE set a high standard for printmaking in the country after the war. Grosman was known for her "tenacious spirit" and dedication to the artists with whom she worked, and these personal qualities often elicited enthusiasm from artists previously unconvinced about the merits of printmaking.
- 1959 – George Lockwood established the Impressions Workshop in Boston, with a focus on lithography and intaglio printing, later adding screen printing.
- 1959 – June Wayne, founder of Tamarind Lithography Workshop (1960), in her funding proposal to the Ford Foundation to launch Tamarind, stated that the purpose of her project was to foster a renaissance in the art of the lithograph in America. She emphasized the vital role that a small number of creative artists can play in generating a renaissance in an art form, when the circumstances of their activities are fortuitous in time and place. A few master printers geographically dispersed in America, with clusters of eager artists learning from them, could lead to a resurgence in global interest.

=== 1960s ===
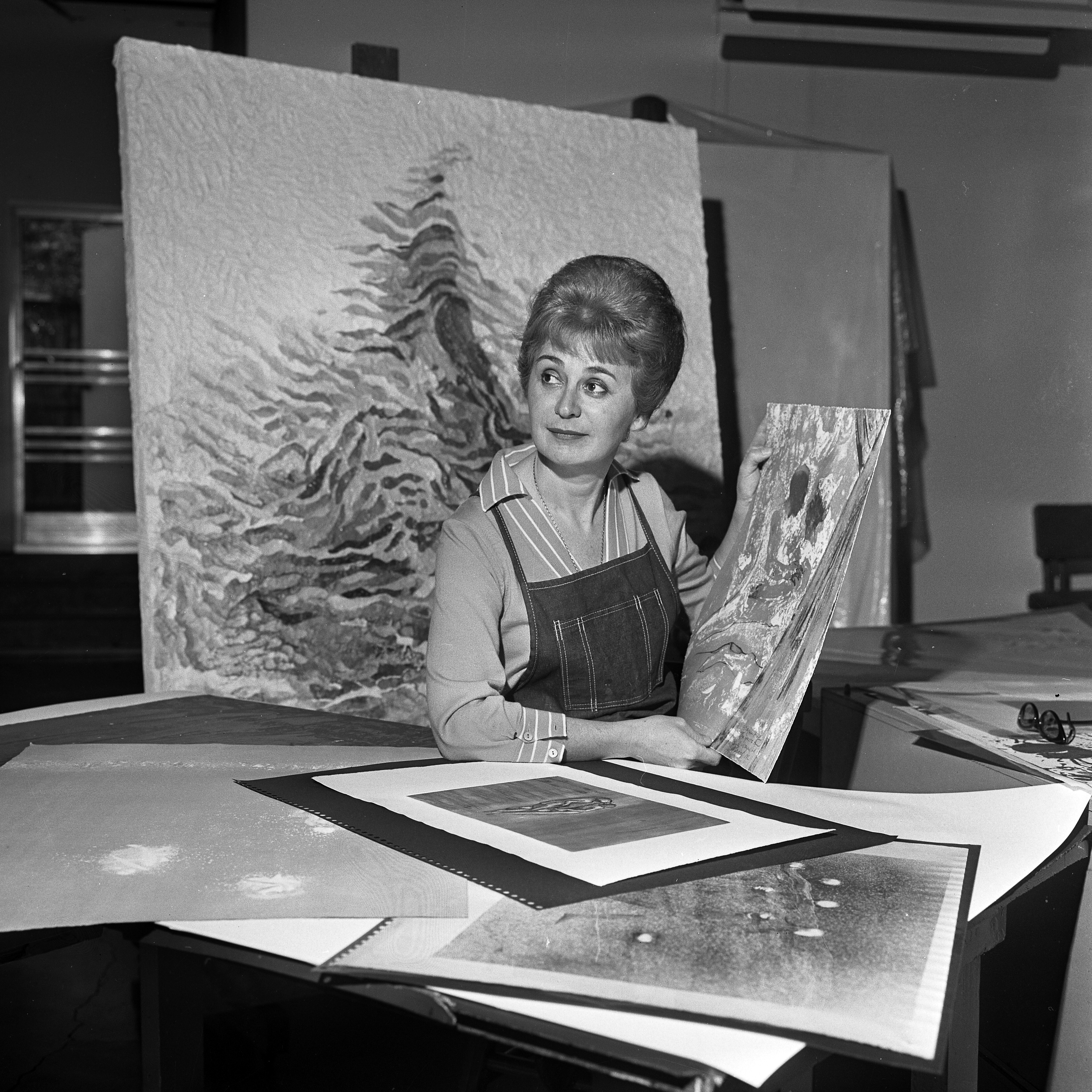
June Wayne at Tamarind Workshop, 1965

- 1960 – June Wayne established and led the Tamarind Institute in Los Angeles, which is widely credited with revitalizing fine art lithography, with co-founders Clinton Adams and Garo Antreasian, launching "a new era in collaborative printmaking". In their first decade they worked with artists such as Josef Albers, Ruth Asawa, Louise Nevelson, and Ed Ruscha. Tamarind later became the Tamarind Institute in affiliation with the University of New Mexico's College of Fine Arts.
- 1960 – Ary and Sheila Marbain established the Maurel Studios.
- 1960 – Grace Hartigan's four-lithograph series The Hero Leaves His Ship by is published by ULAE The series was inspired by Barbara Guest's poem of the same name. It is considered an example of Livres d' Artiste.
- 1960 – Barnett Newman began making lithographs at the Pratt Graphics Workshop.
- 1960 – Jim Dine's six lithograph series Car Crash I-V and End of the Crash was created. The series was based on a 15-minute happening at the Reuben Gallery.
- 1960 – Franz Kline, an American painter associated with Abstract Expressionism, had a drawing reproduced as an etching and Willem de Kooning had an etching in 21 Etchings and Poems, a publication conceived in 1951 by members of New York's Atelier 17.
- 1961 – Publication of What Is an Original Print?: Principles Recommended by the Print Council of America in response to dubious and fraudulent practices in printmaking in the 1950s and a controversy about the definition of an original print.
- 1962 – Andy Warhol visited Max Arthur Cohn's graphic arts studio in Manhattan to learn additional silk screen printmaking techniques. Cohn had worked in the Works Progress Administration's (WPA) easel division and was a co-founder of the National Serigraph Society.
- 1962 – Screen printing was given new energy as Pop art visual imagery replicated popular commercialism, notably in Andy Warhol's Campbell's soup can images, with large scale, colorful, bold prints that highlighted the photo process. The soup can prints brought renewed vitality to the medium of screen printing, perhaps more so than any other artwork since the screen prints of Anthony Velonis and the WPA Federal Art Project team he led in the late 1930's.
- 1962 – Robert Rauschenberg began producing lithographs at Universal Limited Art Editions. One of his first prints was Merger.
- 1962 – Henry Geldzahler, curator of 20th-century art at the Metropolitan Museum of Art, took Robert Rauschenberg to Andy Warhol's studio; Warhol showed the visiting artist how he made art from screen prints. Rauschenberg then used screen printing soon after that in his 1962 work Crocus, to transfer an image in black ink.
- 1962 – Crown Point Press established by Kathan Brown, one of the important and dynamic print shops that were a vital part of an American print renaissance. These print shops operated in the spirit that their European predecessors and counterparts had since the 1800's.
- 1962 – Los Angeles Printmaking Society was founded by artists Connor Everts and Paul Darrow. LAPS is a national nonprofit for the encouragement and advancement of printmaking.
- 1963 (−1968) – Chiron Press founded by artist Steve Poleskie. It was the first print atelier in the greater New York area to do professional screen printing for artists. Among the artists who made silkscreen prints at Chiron: Andy Warhol, Roy Liechtenstein, Larry Rivers, James Rosenquist, Claes Oldenburg.
- 1964 – Wadsworth Atheneum published an edition of 500 of the portfolio X + X (Ten Works by Ten Painters). An early example of prints published by an art organization, it included prints by Stuart Davis, Robert Indiana, Ellsworth Kelly, Roy Lichtenstein, Robert Motherwell, George Ortman, Larry Poons, Frank Stella, Ad Reinhardt, and Andy Warhol.
- 1964 Irwin Hollander, artist and master printer, opened the Hollander Workshop Gallery in New York, with a strong interest in the Abstract Expressionists", working with Robert Motherwell, Louise Nevelson, Ellsworth Kelly, Willem de Kooning, and collaborating with Salvador Dali, Philip Guston, and Claes Oldenburg, among other notable artists. Motherwell made his first great lithograph, Automatism A, (1965) with Hollander.
- 1965 – The portfolio New York Ten was published by Tanglewood Press. An edition of 200 with prints by Richard Anuszkiewicz, Jim Dine, Helen Frankenthaler, Nicholas Krushenick, Robert Kulicke, Mon Levinson, Roy Lichtenstein, Claes Oldenburg, George Segal, and Tom Wesselmann.
- 1965 – Kenneth Tyler, master printer, opened Gemini Ltd., a fledgling print workshop, in the back room of a store-front building in Los Angeles with the aim of integrating new and developing technology into the craft of lithography while introducing contemporary ides into the aesthetic of this printmaking process.
- 1965 – The print publishing company "Multiples, Inc." was established by Marian Goodman.
- 1965 – Roy Lichtenstein created a screenprint Brushstroke.

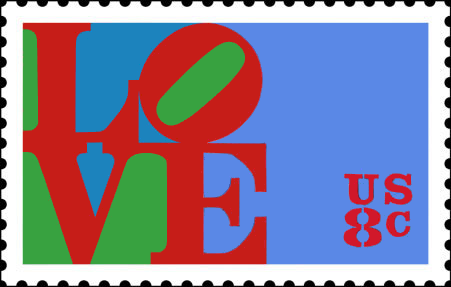
Lovestamp

- 1965 The Museum of Modern Art commissioned the silk screened LOVE Christmas card from Robert Indiana, creating what is considered an iconic image from the 1960s The image was recreated as prints, sculptures, and paintings.
- 1966 – Edward Ruscha's silkscreen print Standard Station was based on his painting of the same name is published by Audrey Sabol in an edition of 50.
- 1967 – Robert Rauschenberg created his six-foot-tall Booster, a "milestone in the history of American printmaking". It was at the time the largest lithograph ever made (approx. 72 x 35 5/8 inches), mixing lithographic and screen printing techniques to enable the artist to create the effects he wanted.
- 1968 – Pablo Picasso's famous 347 series was published. It "demonstrated the rich, often painterly, possibilities of etching."
- 1968 – Warhol's screen print portfolio Campbell's Soup Cans I was published through Factory Additions in an edition of 250.
- 1969 The exhibition Tamarind: Homage to Lithography at the Museum of Modern Art (and later in 1971 the exhibition Technics and Creativity: Gemini G.E.L.) helped legitimize the collaborative print. The market for specialized prints of the post-war years was still developing and did not mature overnight; the acceptance of new types of prints by important museums helped stimulate public awareness and interest.

=== 1970s ===
- 1970 – Cirrus Gallery and Cirrus Editions founded by John Robert Milant in Hollywood, CA as a gallery, publisher and workshop. The Los Angeles County Museum of art acquired the archives of the highly regarded Cirrus Editions, containing 800 artworks that include lithographs, screen prints, etchings and woodcuts, in 1986.
- 1971 – The Tamarind book of lithography: art & techniques by Garo Antreasian, Caroz Antreasian, and Clinton Adams was published by the Tamarind Lithography Workshop. It becomes the standard technical reference book.
- 1972 – The Brandywine Workshop and Archives in Philadelphia was founded by Allan L. Edmunds as a collective of artists and teachers to promote printmaking in an experimental and collaborative environment that welcomed professional printers and artists; it aimed to bring vitality to printmaking as a form of contemporary art.
- 1972 – Agnes Martin's portfolio of 30 screenprints entitled On a Clear Day was published in an edition of 14 by Parasol Press, Ltd.
- 1973 – Simca Print Artists, a press led by Hiroshi Kawanishi, began working with Jasper Johns on Flags, employing thirty one screens to achieve the density and texture suited to the multi-layering of Johns's approach. American screenprinting grew in sophistication and subtlety at Simca, which reached back to a WPA-used silkscreen technique emphasizing a painterly and diaphanous capability.
- 1973 – Establishment of The International Institute of Experimental Printmaking by Garner Tullis in Santa Cruz, CA (re-located three years later to San Francisco), where innovative paper and paper making were a focus.
- 1973 Benjamin Wigfall opened the Communications Village print shop in Kingston, New York.
- 1976 – Atelier Royce (an experimental shop open to artists) was initiated by Richard Royce in Santa Monica, concentrating on paper making and the creation of paper objects, some with woodcut and intaglio printings.
- 1977 – K. Caracio Etching Studios established by Kathy Caraccio.
- 1978 – World Print Council's conference on Paper – Art & Technology (held at the San Francisco Museum of Art) included as panelists: printmakers, workshop directors, and curators of print collections.
- 1978 – Derrière L'Étoile Studios, a fine art lithography printmaking workshop, founded by Maurice Sánchez in New York, operating primarily on contract and collaborating with a range of artists on a multitude of types of projects, specializing in lithography and a unique approach to monoprinting.
- 1979 – Echo Press was founded. A prestigious independent and collaborative fine print workshop associated with Indiana University, Echo Press was started by printmaker and painter Rudy Pozzatti. The workshop operated for sixteen years, producing 191 editions, including 400 monotypes, by 47 artists.

=== 1980s ===
- 1980 – Peter Blum Edition was established in New York City, specializing in portfolio editions.
- 1980 – Donald Farnsworth started Magnolia Editions in California, with capabilities for lithography, intaglio, and mono printing.
- 1981 – The Janet Turner Print Museum opened in Chico, California, to house 2,000 prints donated from the private print collection of American artist and print collector, Janet E. Turner (1914–1988), who was an art professor at California State University, Chico.
- 1983 – Keith Haring, who had experimented with lithography in the late 1970's, began to make screen prints, or serigraphs. Before long he was creating inventive and bold prints, probably inspired by the work of Andy Warhol, a key influence on Haring.
- 1985 – The large-format ink jet Iris printer became commercially available and began to be used to create fine art prints.
- 1987 – The International Fine Art Print Dealers Association (IFPDA) was established as an organization for fine print artists. The annual IFPDA Print Fair in New York City presents curated collections of fine art prints and editions from old master to contemporary.
- 1989 – By the end of the 1980's printmaking was very well established in America, with many major artists contributing to the medium. Sotheby's and Christie's had semiannual auctions focused entirely on contemporary prints. Minimal and Conceptual work enjoyed a resurgence in interest late in the 1980's.

=== 1990s ===
- 1990 – The contemporary print market suffered badly in that year's spring auction at Sotheby's and Christie's as a major recession hit the country. Art was quickly devalued, with numerous auction lots passed on. Printmaking by then, however, had become an integral part of the art scene in America, of interest to and challenging many important artists.
- 1990 – Anchor Graphics was founded by David Jones and Marilyn Propp. It was a non-profit studio in the spirit of Robert Blackburn's Printmakers Workshop, a multi-faceted studio that integrates the teaching and promotion of printmaking within a professional collaborative workshop, with a small gallery, concentrating on established as well as emerging artists in the Chicago region (David Rustic, Michiko Itatini, Hollis Sigler, and Karl Wirsum, for example). Anchor later became a program of the Art + Design department within Columbia College Chicago's School of Fine and Performing Arts in 2006 and continued until 2015.
- 1990 – Keith Haring, just one month before his death, published his final edition on paper, a portfolio of 17 silkscreens called The Blue Print Drawings, revisiting a portfolio of drawings he created in 1981, "the last cohesive project of his career".
- 1991 – Jack Duganne began using the term Giclée prints to refer to digital prints.
- 1994–95 – The Prints of Roy Lichtenstein, an exhibition at the National Gallery of Art in Washington D.C. of 85 prints and 7 sculptures varying from his first op image through recent works. Also shown at the Los Angeles County Museum of Art, 1995.
- 1994 – Museum of Modern Art exhibition, Three Masters of the Bauhaus: Lionel Feininger, Vasily Kandinsky, and Paul Klee. An exhibition of printed work – lithography, woodcuts, intaglio – by three modern masters who taught at the Bauhaus during the 1920s; seventy-five prints and illustrated books, including also examples of the artist's early prints.
- 1996 – Print Center New York (formerly International Print Center New York, IPCNY) was chartered as a non-profit exhibition space in New York that explores exploring the lively and accessible medium of print. It offers exhibitions, scholarship, educational programming, and digital resources.
- 1996 – The Metropolitan Museum of Art exhibition W.P.A. Color Prints: Images from the Federal Art Project. The News Release noted that the selection of works have rarely or never been exhibited previously. The works show various advanced printmaking practices of the time and have impacted the history of American printmaking. Lectures and Gallery talks accompanied the exhibition, March through May.
- 1998 – Tandem Press (University of Wisconsin-Madison) sponsored a symposium called The Current State of Printmaking in America, attended by 250 artists, curators, dealers, publishers, administrators, and print connoisseurs. Yale University Art Gallery, the Whitney Museum, and Tamarind Institute participated. A recurring topic of discussion was the rapid advance of computer technology and digital printmaking.

== See also ==
- Master printmaker
- European printmaking in the 20th century
