= Master printmaker =

Master printmakers or master printers are specialized technicians who hand-print editions of works of an artist in printmaking. Master printmakers often own and/or operate their own printmaking studio or print shop. Business activities of a Master printshop may include: publishing and printing services, educational workshops or classes, mentorship of artists, and artist residencies.

The role of the specialist printers mostly emerged from the 18th century onwards. Previously artists in printmaking mostly printed their own prints, as for example Rembrandt did; he had a printing press for etchings and engravings in his house. For woodcuts the blockcutter had long been a specialist artisan, sometimes famous. Printing of lithographs from the 19th century on has normally been a specialist process.

Training for master printmakers varies by technique, geography, and culture. Master printmakers are almost always trained by other master printmakers. The Tamarind Institute is one formal institution mandated to train master lithographers, located in New Mexico. In the 20th century in Britain there was a federation of master printers called the British Printing Industries Federation, renamed the British Federation of Master Printers (BFMP) in the 1930s and then again renamed the British Printing Industries Federation in the 1970s.

== Notable people ==
=== Contemporary, mostly Americans ===
- Peter Braune of New Leaf Editions, Vancouver, Canada.
- Kathan Brown of Crown Point Press in San Francisco, California.
- Kathy Caraccio of K. Caracio Etching Studios.
- Alfonso Crujera of the Electro-Etching Residency-Workshop, Gran Canaria, Spain.
- Donald Farnsworth of Magnolia Editions, Oakland, California.
- Sheila Marbain established the Maurel Studios in 1955.
- Barry Moser of Pennyroyal Press, Easthampton, Massachusetts.
- Catherine Mosley collaborated with Robert Motherwell from the early 1970s to the early 1990s.
- Lothar Osterburg of Lothar Osterburg Photogravure, New York City, New York.
- Andrew Raftery of Rhode Island School of Design, Providence, Rhode Island.
- Peter Rutledge Koch of Peter Koch Printers of Berkeley, California
- Brian Shure of Anderson Ranch Arts Center, Snowmass Village, Colorado.
- Judith Solodkin, Solo Press.
- Richard Spare of Wellington Studios, London.
- Donn Steward, Universal Limited Art Editions.
- Kenneth E. Tyler of Tyler Graphics Ltd, Mount Kisco, New York

=== Historical master printmakers, mostly American ===
- Clinton Adams of the Tamarind Institute, Albuquerque, New Mexico.
- Garo Antreasian of the Tamarind Institute, Albuquerque, New Mexico.
- Martin Barooshian of Pratt Graphic Art Center, New York City, New York
- Leonard Baskin of The Gehenna Press, Northampton, Massachusetts.
- Robert Blackburn of Robert Blackburn Printmaking Workshop, New York City, New York
- Warrington Colescott of Mantegna Press of Hollandale, Wisconsin
- Aldo Crommelynck of Atelier Crommelynck of Paris
- Ernest de Soto of de Soto Workshop, San Francisco, California
- Sidney B. Felsen of Gemini G.E.L., Los Angeles, California
- Frederick Goulding of Royal Society of Painter-Etchers, London, England.
- Stanley Grinstein of Gemini G.E.L., Los Angeles, California.
- Tatyana Grosman of Universal Limited Art Editions (ULAE), West Islip, New York.
- Stanley William Hayter of Atelier 17, Paris, France.
- Józef Hecht
- Irwin Hollander of Hollander’s Workshop, New York City
- Lynton Richards Kistler of Los Angeles, California.
- Karel Klíč of Vienna, Austria.
- Giovanni Mardersteig of Officina Bodoni Press, various locations in Europe.
- Krishna Reddy of Atelier 17, Paris, France.
- Jack Stauffacher, of Greenwood Press, San Francisco, California
- Birgit Skiöld of The Print Workshop, London
- Dox Thrash of Fine Print Workshop of Philadelphia.
- June Wayne of the Tamarind Institute in Albuquerque, New Mexico.
- Anna Wong of the Pratt Graphic Art Center, New York City
- Kurt Zein of Werkstatt für hangedruckte Originalgrpahik, Wien / Workshop for handprinted original graphics, Vienna

== See also ==
- List of printmakers
- Old master print
- Old master
- International Print Center New York
- Timeline of 20th century printmaking in America
