= Louise Belcourt =

Canadian-American painter (born 1961)

- Born: 1961 (age 64–65); Montreal, Canada
- Education: Mount Allison University
- Known for: Painter
- Awards: John S. Guggenheim Fellowship, Pollock-Krasner Foundation, New York Foundation for the Arts
- Website: Louise Belcourt

Louise Belcourt, Mound #12, oil on panel, 22” x 29”, 2012.

Louise Belcourt (born 1961) is a Canadian-American artist based in New York, known for elusive, largely abstract paintings that blend modernist formal play, a commitment to the physical world, and a visual language that shifts between landscape and the body, architecture and geometric form. New York Times critic Ken Johnson writes of her earlier work, "balancing adroitly between Color Field abstraction and Pop-style representation, Ms. Belcourt's paintings invite meditation on the perceptual, the conceptual and how our minds construct the world." Describing her later evolution, David Brody writes in Artcritical, "Hard-nosed Canadian empiricism and Brooklyn grit seem to combine in Belcourt’s work to undermine stylistic stasis."

Belcourt has exhibited internationally, including shows at the Brooklyn Museum of Art, Vienna Kunstlerhaus, The Drawing Center, Stewart Hall (Quebec), and the Weatherspoon Art Museum. She has received awards from the John S. Guggenheim Foundation, Pollock-Krasner Foundation and New York Foundation for the Arts, among others, and her art belongs to the art collections of the Montreal Museum of Fine Arts, the Cultural Ministry of Quebec, and Fleming Museum of Art.

Belcourt splits her time between Brooklyn, New York and eastern Quebec, Canada.

== Early life and career ==
Belcourt was born in 1961 and raised in Montreal, Canada and spent summers in the Quebec town of Métis-sur-Mer, on the south bank of the St. Lawrence River. She developed an interest in art as a child from working alongside her grandfather, an amateur painter, and from art lessons taken from age eight through high school. When she was twenty-one years old, Belcourt's mother died after a long illness; she expressed the loss in an early series of portraits of her mother hovering or disappearing in an abstract landscape, which she based on a photograph taken in her mother's youth. Belcourt studied at Mount Allison University in rural New Brunswick (BFA, 1983), then moved to New York City in 1984, drawn by its greater sense of freedom and opportunity for pursuing a career as a painter. She built her reputation in the 1990s through group exhibitions at The Drawing Center, Brooklyn Museum of Art, and Weatherspoon Art Museum and her first solo shows at the Annika Sundvik (1996) and Peter Blum (1997) galleries in New York.

Since 2000, Belcourt has worked for roughly four months of each year beginning in late May in Métis-sur-Mer, filling notebooks with plein-air gouache drawings of what she calls the landscape's clean, clear "heightened reality" and working on canvasses continued upon her return to Brooklyn. In the 2000s, Belcourt has had solo exhibitions at Jeff Bailey Gallery (New York), Galerie Vidal-Saint Phalle and Galerie 5 ème Étage (Paris), Patricia Sweetow Gallery (San Francisco), and Locks Gallery (Philadelphia), among others.

== Work ==
Louise Belcourt, My Beautiful Family, oil on canvas, 72" x 80", 1995.

Belcourt's paintings have been described as "battles between landscape and abstraction" that explore liminal spaces of perception; she terms them "paintings of sculptures of landscapes." Her idiosyncratic visual language remains distinct from either a purely representational or abstract syntax, combining natural, architectural and geometric forms—often stacked, floating, occluded or cascading—that can evoke landscapes, prehistoric mounds, the built world or the body; as a result, her work is difficult to categorize. ARTnews's Amanda Church writes, "Belcourt has carved a unique niche for herself in the canon of contemporary painting: the best kind, where antecedents are traceable but there's nothing that's quite the same."

Critics have likened Belcourt's biomorphic and slab-like forms to those of Philip Guston and Giorgio Morandi; her exploration of pictorial ambiguity to early Modernists Georgia O'Keeffe, Marsden Hartley and Arthur Dove, as well as Malevich and Mondrian; her commitment to the physical and bodily experience to Canadian visionary landscape artists the Group of Seven, Emily Carr and Anne Savage, and the work's sense of mystery to that of Giorgio de Chirico and Ellsworth Kelly.

=== Early painting ===
Belcourt's early painting has been characterized as abstract and intensely physical, with a combination of sensuality, aggression and rough, raw feeling that ran counter to the cool, conceptual art dominant in the 1990s. Critics compare the work's dense surfaces to those of Elizabeth Murray and its gestural violence to the paintings of Joan Mitchell and Cy Twombly. Characteristic works by Belcourt in this period feature elemental, mysterious dark- or blood-red biomorphic blobs, which hover on layered, creamy surfaces suggesting flesh or earth that she distressed with scuffs, scars, punctures and stains. In her review of Belcourt's first solo show, New York Times critic Roberta Smith notes subtle indications of an interest in the body and landscape, pronouncing the effect of works such as My Beautiful Family (1995) as "peculiarly vulnerable" like "a painting with scraped knees."

In his review of Belcourt's next show (Peter Blum, 1997), ARTnews critic Gregory Volk describes her paintings (e.g., General Upsets, 1996; They'll Never Forgive You for Being Pretty, 1996-7) as "palpably human" abstractions that were at once "searing and gorgeous," intensely personal and restrained, ethereal and brutal. Dominique Nahas notes the work's careful mix of deliberateness and happenstance, understated optical effects and shifting figure-ground relationships, which creates a "life force" fluctuating between tenderness and vehemence, theatricality and non-narrative form.

Louise Belcourt, Hedge Painting #2, oil on canvas, 57” x 76”, 2003

=== Painting 2000–2008 ===
In the early 2000s, Belcourt began to make more concrete references to landscapes inspired by stark Canadian coastal vistas and wilderness; these references result in a representational/abstract ambiguity enabling the juxtaposition of more concepts (e.g., painterliness and Pop artificiality) and feelings (humor, surreality, erotic anxiety) in her paintings. Works such as Sky Painting (2000) feature subtly modulated, horizontal bands suggesting stretches of land, sky and sea, their spacious calm disrupted with the intrusion of incongruous red tongue- or finger-like shapes. In Island (2000) and Woo (2001), small tufts of grass transform abstract color-field paintings into seascapes—in these cases unsettled by what The New Yorker describes as "a Gustonish serpent slithering into Eden" in the former, and a red eel- or finger-like shape popping through the surface in the latter.

In the simplified, sharply contoured compositions of her "Hedge" paintings and "Cedar" drawings (2001–8), Belcourt's blob shapes give way to sculptural, monolithic slabs enhanced by cast light, which are set off by simplified pine tree and bare branch forms. The blocky shapes—inspired by the hedges of Métis-sur-Mer and painted in a palette of greens, aqua-blues, and creams—have been likened to pared-down loaves and pods, monumental sofa cushions and "modernist modules." The ambiguity of the minimal forms took Belcourt's work in an intentionally unresolved, occasionally comical direction that Art in America labels "abstraction shading into figuration" and Time Out terms "visual version(s) of Zen koans"; these reviews draw parallels in the work to artists as diverse as Guston, De Chirico and Richard Serra.

=== Later painting ===
Louise Belcourt, Cliff Flower #8, oil on canvas, 56” x 72”, 2017.

Critics note a greater degree of spatial effects and figure-ground contradictions in Belcourt's later work, achieved through subtle shifts in tone, color and light and more expansive forms and compositions that conflate landscape, cityscape and geometry, and organic and artificial. These paintings are regarded as reflecting Belcourt's dual Brooklyn/Quebec experience and—according to John Yau—are less about landscape or abstraction than about "the visual signs we assume to be integral to each." He writes, "It is this doubleness that Belcourt brings to fruition in her work; and it is unlike anyone else’s … revealing more possibilities the more time you spend with them." Writers also note her later work's resistance to fashionable and academic discourses (e.g., appropriation, ironic signaling, or digital media) and ongoing commitment to modernist formal play, physicality, emotion and the craft of painting.

In the "HedgeLand Paintings" (2009–10), Belcourt shifts in a geometric direction, replacing formerly sweeping vistas with dense, fractured configurations of stacked brick- or box-like, modular forms that press against the picture plane and defy spatial logic. The imagery of these paintings ranges from clearly referenced landforms—sometimes wrapped around architectonic, gate-like shapes or monoliths—to almost purely abstract, fluid configurations of soft-edged, rectangular shapes that resemble the compressed stacking of form in a cityscape. Belcourt's portrayal of light through the interplay of lighter façades and shadowed edges is a key component of her later work, creating a convincing sense of three-dimensionality and space beyond the canvas in essentially flat, two-dimensional paintings.

The "Mound" paintings, begun in 2011, offer compositions that are less dense and feature sculptural shapes resembling buildings, appliances, boxes, or mountains. Amanda Church describes them as "mini-worlds open to myriad interpretations." In her "Cliff Flower" and "Lamb's Ears" works (2015–7) Belcourt incorporates a more varied palette—including black and greyed color shades—as well as curved, plant- and blimp-like forms that break up the space and are influenced (in shape and color) by her interest in gardening. Critics suggest these more organic and anthropomorphic forms (reflected in titles connoting both plant and animal life) convey a paradoxical sense of being both rooted in the world and imbued "with a distinct sense of self-reliance." In her 2020 show at Locks Gallery, Belcourt departed from her characteristic oil works, presenting collages made of painted and cut gouache shapes, which nod to the energetic simplicity of Matisse's cutouts from the late 1940s.

== Awards and collections ==
Belcourt has been awarded a John S. Guggenheim Fellowship (2012), New York Foundation for the Arts Fellowship (2015), and Pollock-Krasner Foundation (2017, 2000) and Elizabeth Greenshields Foundation (1985, 1984) grants. She has also received artists residencies from Yaddo (1992) and Millay Colony for the Arts (1990). Her work belongs to the public collections of the Montreal Museum of Fine Arts, Cultural Ministry of Quebec, Aspen Contemporary Art Collection, Council for the Estate of Francis Picabia, and Fleming Museum of Art, as well as many corporate and private collections in Europe, the United States and Canada.
