= Birgit Skiöld =

Swedish artist (1923–1982)

- Skiöld, c. 1968
- Born: March 18, 1923; Stockholm, Sweden
- Died: May 31, 1982 (aged 59); London, England, UK
- Education: Konstfack, Anglo-French Art Centre, University of Westminster, Académie de la Grande Chaumière
- Occupation: Master printmaker
- Known for: lithography, etching, embossing, artist's book, collage
- Spouse: Peter Bird (m. 1965–1982; death)

Birgit Skiöld (18 March 1923 – 18 May 1982) was a Swedish master printmaker and modernist artist who ran the highly successful Print Workshop in the basement of 28 Charlotte Street, London from 1958 to the late 1970s. She was a noted member of the London art scene during that period, and her life is commemorated by an eponymous award for innovation in printmaking.

== Early life and studies ==
Skiöld was born in Stockholm, Sweden in 1923. She studied furniture design at Stockholm Tekniska Skolan (now Konstfack University College of Arts, Crafts and Design), and moved to London in 1948. There she studied at the Anglo-French Art Centre, making connections with artists Francis Bacon, Eduardo Paolozzi and curator/writer David Sylvester. She was inspired to try printmaking following a lithographic exhibition featuring Max Ernst and Oskar Kokoschka. She studied printmaking with Henry Trivick and etching (with Richard Beer) at the Regent Street Polytechnic (now the University of Westminster). She completed her studies in Paris at the Académie de la Grande Chaumière in 1954.

== Print Workshop ==
On returning from Paris, Skiöld set up a printmaking workshop in George Street in Marylebone with a lithographic press and stones acquired from Vanessa Bell and previously used by Edward Ardizzone. Feeling the need to expand and collaborate, Skiöld set up the Print Workshop in the basement of Adrian and Corinne Heath's house in Charlotte Street, Fitzrovia. The workshop's ethos was inspired by Stanley William Hayter’s Atelier 17 in Paris and partly by Myfanwy Piper's comments on BBC Radio that London needed "an atelier where artists and professional engravers can inspire each other.” The setup process began in 1956 and the presses were transferred to Charlotte Street in May 1958.

Artists sought out the Print Workshop to use the facilities, share knowledge and learn from Skiöld. These included Michael Ayrton, Fionnuala Boyd, Kathan Brown, Jim Dine, David Hockney, Allen Jones, Eduardo Paolozzi, Tom Phillips, Dieter Roth, Michael Rothenstein, William Tillyer, Joe Tilson and William G. Tucker.

It was unusual for a woman to be running such a prominent establishment at this time, but Skiöld's personality and connections led to a space she described as: “Not a business, not a college, not a gallery, simply an idea which has worked.” Her husband Peter Bird, director of Bradford City Art Galleries and Museums, described it as having "a lively and industrious atmosphere, when it was at its best, and a little chaotic on a bad day."

Students at the Royal College of Art, Central School of Art and Chelsea School of Art, among others, benefitted from her printmaking lectures, and she taught workshops in universities in the United States, Sweden and Japan.

Robert Erskine, who ran the St George's Gallery at 7 Cork Street, and who was to be influential in encouraging Stanley Jones to set up the Curwen Press, another operation with Fitzrovia connections through the Curwen Gallery in Windmill Street, was a generous supporter of Skiöld's vision. They were to organise several exhibitions of Print Workshop artists together over the coming years.

== Work ==
Skiöld was a pioneer in championing the status of printmaking as art, and experimenting with techniques including embossing, mixed media, Xerox printing and collage. She was also an early exponent of the artist's book (livre d’artiste), working on occasion with texts by other famous Fitzrovia residents, past and present.

Her first artist's book incorporated texts by the pre-Raphaelite painter Dante Gabriel Rossetti, who was born at No.38 Charlotte Street and later lived at No.50, and at 37 Fitzroy Square.

A shared love of Japan led her to produce three bookworks with poet and travel writer James Kirkup. The first, Scenes from Sesshu was published in 1977, the same year that the charge of blasphemous libel was resurrected and used for the first time in 50 years to prosecute Gay News for publishing Kirkup's poem The Love That Dares to Speak Its Name. Kirkup was a well known fixture in the pubs and clubs of Fitzrovia, and was renting a room above a shoe shop at 77A Tottenham Court Road from 1948.

Her archived papers are held at the Victoria and Albert Museum.
