= Aaron S. Coleman =

American artist

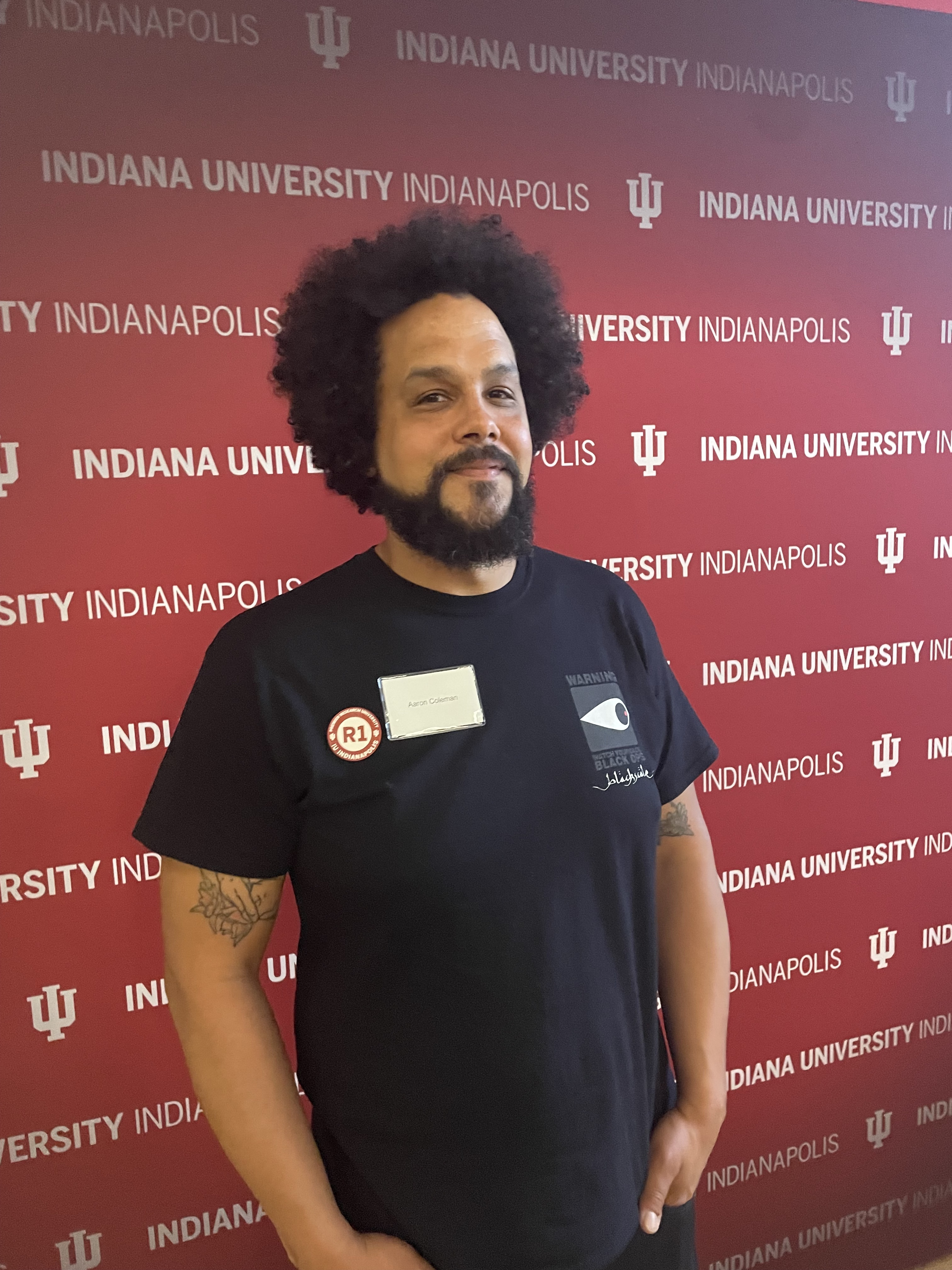
- Born: January 29, 1985 (age 41); Washington, D.C.
- Education: BFA - Herron School of Art and Design 2009; MFA - Northern Illinois University 2013
- Employer(s): Herron School of Art and Design, Indiana University, Indianapolis
- Known for: Artist (sculptor and printmaker)
- Website: https://aaroncolemanprintmaking.com/

Aaron S. Coleman (born 1985) is an American multidisciplinary artist who works in printmaking, sculpture, and installation. He recontextualizes found imagery and artifacts to create jarring juxtapositions in his exploration of the legacy of slavery, ongoing systems of white supremacy, and contemporary Black experience in the United States.

== Early life and education ==
Coleman was born in Washington, D.C. and later relocated to Indianapolis with his family. His early years as an artist were influenced by hip hop and street art, and he created graffiti and large-scale murals on bridges, trains, and billboards in both cities. He attended the Herron School of Art and Design at Indiana University—Purdue University Indianapolis as an undergraduate and received an MFA from Northern Illinois University in 2013. He serves as the Kenneth E. Tyler Endowed Chair in Printmaking at IU Indianapolis.

== Artwork ==
Regardless of medium, Coleman frequently uses found imagery and everyday objects in order to construct complex statements about historical memory and authoritarian systems of control, including science, organized religion, anthropology, and the criminal justice system. His prints and mixed media work combine comic book motifs, stained glass imagery, children's book illustrations, and racist caricatures of Black people in jarring ways. His installations create new narratives from the combination of disparate objects, such as picket fences, textiles, gymnasium flooring, found signage, popular culture ephemera, and recontextualized racist memorabilia.

== Exhibitions and awards ==
His work has been exhibited at the Phoenix Institute of Contemporary Art, the University of Texas at San Antonio, Mesa Arts Center, Hilliard Art Museum, The Janet Turner Print Museum (California State University, Chico), the SOO Visual Arts Center, the Print Center New York, and BUTTER Art Fair, among others. He was awarded a 2022 Art as Activism Grant by the Black Box Press Foundation and received a 2023 New Voices Fellowship from the Print Center New York. His work is held in a range public and private collections, including those of the Janet Turner Print Museum, Ino Paper Museum, Yekaterinburg Museum of Fine Arts, the National Library of France, and the Artist Printmaker/Photographer Research Archive at Texas Tech University.
