= Tanglewood Press =

Fine print publisher in New York City

The Tanglewood Press was a fine print publisher established by Rosa Esman in 1964. It was known for specializing in producing portfolio editions.

In 1965 it produced the portfolio New York Ten. An edition of 200 with prints by Richard Anuszkiewicz, Jim Dine, Helen Frankenthaler, Nicholas Krushenick, Robert Kulicke, Mon Levinson, Roy Lichtenstein, Claes Oldenburg, George Segal, and Tom Wesselmann. In 1966 it produced the portfolio Seven Objects in a Box which included works by Allan D'Arcangelo, Jim Dine, Roy Lichtenstein, Claes Oldenburg, George Segal, Andy Warhol, and Tom Wesselmann. It went on to publish Ten from Leo Castelli, 1967 including works by Lee Bontecou, Jasper Johns, Donald Judd, Roy Lichtenstein, Robert Morris, Larry Poons, Robert Rauschenberg, James Rosenquist, Frank Stella, and Andy Warhol.

Tanglewood Press ceased publishing in 1991.

Works produced by the Tanglewood Press are included in the Art Institute of Chicago, the Metropolitan Museum of Art, the Museum of Modern Art, the National Gallery of Art, and The Nelson-Atkins Museum of Art.
