= Feather Mountain (book) =

1952 Caldecott picture book

- Author: Elizabeth Olds
- Publisher: Houghton
- Publication date: 1951
- Pages: unpaged
- Awards: Caldecott Honor

Feather Mountain is a 1951 picture book written and illustrated by Elizabeth Olds. Birds without any feathers must journey to feather mountain in order to get the plumage. The book was a recipient of a 1952 Caldecott Honor for its illustrations.
