= Kenneth E. Tyler =

American master printmaker

Kenneth E. Tyler AO
- Born: December 13, 1931 (age 94); East Chicago, Indiana, U.S.
- Other name: Ken Tyler
- Education: Indiana University
- Alma mater: School of the Art Institute of Chicago; Herron School of Art and Design; Tamarind Lithography Workshop (now Tamarind Institute)
- Occupations: Master printmaker, publisher, arts educator
- Years active: 1966–2001
- Employer: Tamarind Lithography Workshop (1964–5)
- Known for: Gemini GEL Tyler Graphics; The Singapore Tyler Print Institute Kenneth Tyler Collection, National Gallery of Australia
- Board member of: Gemini Ltd, LA (1965) Gemini GEL, LA (1966–73); Tyler Workshop, NY (1973) Tyler Graphics Ltd, NY (1974–2001)
- Website: Kenneth Tyler Collection website

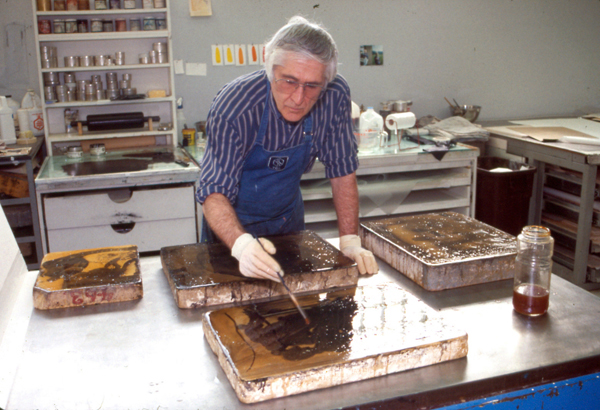
Ken Tyler processing lithography stones drawn by Helen Frankenthaler during her 'Reflections' series, Tyler Graphics Ltd., Mount Kisco, New York, 1994.

Kenneth E. Tyler, AO (born December 13, 1931) is a master printmaker, publisher, arts educator and a prominent figure in the American post-war revival of fine art, limited edition printmaking. Tyler established leading print workshops and publishing houses on both West and East coasts of the United States and made several innovations in printmaking technology. His technical expertise and willingness to experiment on a bold scale drew many famous and influential artists to his workshops, among them Frank Stella, Helen Frankenthaler, Roy Lichtenstein, David Hockney, Robert Rauschenberg, Anthony Caro and Jasper Johns. Ken Tyler remains active as an educator and promoter of fine art printmaking, and mentor of a younger generation of printers through his various training and collecting institutions in Singapore, Japan, Australia and the US. The largest collection of prints produced at Tyler's successive workshops is currently held by the National Gallery of Australia.

== Early life and education ==
Ken Tyler was born in East Chicago, Indiana in 1931. His father was Romanian and his mother Hungarian, and his parents both emigrated as young children to United States. There Tyler’s father (whose family name was Tyira, converted to Tyler in the US) worked in the Indiana steel mills from 12 years of age and also learned the trade of a stonemason. This background gave Tyler an early appreciation of the need for technical excellence.

Encouraged by his school music teacher, Tyler developed an interest in the visual arts and subsequently studied at the School of the Art Institute of Chicago, from 1950 to 1951. Coming from a family of modest means, Tyler sought paid employment throughout his student years. From 1951 to 1952, he studied liberal arts at Indiana University, which, according to Tyler, consisted of "one semester at the campus in Bloomington, Indiana and one semester at Gary, Indiana extension while I worked full time in the Gary steel mill and attended evening classes at the extension". Originally Tyler had planned further studies at the Sorbonne in Paris. It was during the Korean War, and while applying for his passport in September 1952, he was drafted for military service. After undergoing basic training, he excelled as an officer candidate and won the opportunity to return to college, where he was given the title of ‘Regimental Staff Artist’, maintained an active private painting studio and also edited the Officer Corps newspaper.

Tyler studied further following his time in the army, earning a bachelor's in art education from the School of the Art Institute of Chicago in 1957. Tyler then studied lithography under Garo Antreasian at the John Herron School of Art (now Herron School of Art and Design) in Indiana, graduating with a Master of Art Education in 1963.

== Tamarind Lithography Workshop ==
In 1963, Tyler received a Ford Foundation Grant to study printing at the Tamarind Lithography Workshop in Los Angeles. This workshop, co-founded by June Wayne and Clinton Adams, was established in 1960 with the intention of reviving the ‘dying’ art of lithography. Here Tyler worked under technical director Irwin Hollander and also later studied under the French master printer Marcel Durassier. Durassier, who was noted for his technical skill, had worked at the French lithography workshop, Mourlot Frères, with some of the great artists of the School of Paris, including Pablo Picasso and Joan Miró. Here Tyler acquired a broad technical skills base through research and practice, and from 1964-5 was appointed Technical Director of the Workshop. It was in this role that Tyler had his first major collaboration with Josef Albers, an artist who became, in Tyler’s words, "the catalyst of my career."

== Gemini Ltd. and Gemini G.E.L. ==
In 1965, Ken Tyler established his own print atelier, Gemini Ltd., at 8221 Melrose Avenue in Los Angeles with his former wife Kay Tyler. From this modest workshop was born Gemini G.E.L. (Graphic Editions Ltd.). The following year Tyler, with the backing of his partners, Sidney Felsen and Stanley Grinstein, began to develop this print and publishing workshop into a large and influential organisation that attracted American artists including Josef Albers, Jasper Johns and Robert Rauschenberg. The clean, crisp look and flawless finish of many Gemini G.E.L. prints, as well as Tyler’s apparent preference for collaborating with well-established artists, was criticized by some commentators. Participants in the 1971 Gemini G.E.L. exhibition Technics and Creativity, for example, were accused of commercialism and too great an emphasis on technique. These criticisms tended to ignore Tyler’s use of many complex, time-consuming traditional methods, which he often combined with less orthodox printing processes. Works such as Robert Rauschenberg’s iconic Booster (1967), which was an experimental and labor-intensive "hybrid" of lithography and screen printing, exemplify this approach. Tyler's work with well-known artists also created the economic and technically innovative foundation for lesser known artists to print and be published through Gemini G.E.L.

== Tyler Workshop Ltd. and Tyler Graphics Ltd. ==
In 1973, after selling his collection of printer's proofs and drawings to the National Gallery of Australia, Tyler parted ways with Gemini G.E.L. to seek new direction on the East Coast of America. There he established Tyler Workshop Ltd. in Bedford Village, New York. The following year this workshop became Tyler Graphics Ltd., and in 1987 expanded its premises to Mount Kisco, New York.

Over its twenty-five year history, Tyler Graphics Ltd. saw collaborations with artists as diverse as Josef Albers, Anni Albers, Claes Oldenburg, Masami Teraoka, Ellsworth Kelly, Nancy Graves, Anthony Caro, Robert Motherwell, James Rosenquist, Joan Mitchell, and more. Certain artists in Tyler’s stable, such as David Hockney, Frank Stella and Roy Lichtenstein, continued to work with him over several decades and through many stylistic progressions.

When Tyler made the "difficult decision" to retire from printing in January 2000, he had built up a massive operation that was staffed by highly trained specialists and serviced by state-of-the-art printing technology. Print production has ceased at Tyler Graphics Ltd., following the establishment of The Singapore Tyler Print Institute in 2001.

== Contributions to print technology ==
Ken Tyler has had a formative influence on the art and science of printmaking for close to five decades. His contributions to printing technology were driven by his industrial background and his recognition that "most traditional [printmaking] methods, as well as some recent practices of the hand-printing crafts, were not compatible with the images of major contemporary artists. As a collaborator I left the ranks of this revival to aid the major artist in his search for new graphic expression and new work environments." Tyler became renowned for printing works on paper that were massive in size and required the co-ordination of complicated mixed media and multiple printing matrices (Frank Stella’s The Fountain, for example, measures over 2 metres x over 7 metres, used hundreds of plates and was printed on a specially constructed press). Tyler also custom-designed paper and equipment to his own specifications; built his own paper mill, which contributed to a resurgence in the use of handmade papers among printmakers; and travelled to Japan to investigate traditional printing and papermaking methods.

In 1965, Tyler designed the first of several hydraulic lithographic presses, and two years later he received a federal arts funding grant from the National Endowment for the Arts for research and development into paper, embossing and three-dimensional works. In 1978 Tyler patented and registered Tycore, a rigid archival honeycomb paper panel, and a decade later, from 1988–90, he designed and constructed a computer-controlled, power-driven combination lithography and etching press with a five-by-ten foot printing bed.

To ensure that the workshop’s momentum continued, Tyler encouraged artists to return for additional projects using a variety of methods and materials, maintaining that "you couldn’t just keep inviting [artists] back to make a lithograph or inviting them back to make a silk screen. You [had] to keep giving them something new to chew on". According to Tyler, it was sufficient to offer the option to work on a large scale. He also wanted to present artists with the opportunity to work with handmade paper. This began with a project with Robert Rauschenberg in 1985-94, who explored handmade papermaking in his series Pages and fuses at the paper mill in Ambert in France. A further collaboration using handmade paper occurred between Tyler and David Hockney, who produced a series of paper pulp works in 1978. Later, Frank Stella explored the notion of papermaking further in his Moby Dick Domes series, notable for their technical complexity and their three-dimensional nature. After years of research to work out ways of making shaped paper, Tyler developed a vacuum method to produce the required sculptural form.

In a later collaboration between Stella and Tyler, The Fountain ‘mural’ print (1992) exemplifies Tyler’s ability to offer mixed media prints on a grand scale. The Fountain measures over 2 metres x by 7 metres, and three woodblocks and 105 intaglio plates were employed to produce the sixty-seven coloured print Stella required in his original collage composition. Tyler once commented, "My choice of wood-block was made based on the large size of the print. Both Frank and I knew we were going to use some of the existing metal plates from the Moby Dick prints series. It was determined that the black image would be printed from the woodblock and the colors would be from metal insert plates". Very large triple ply washi (Kozo fibre) papers were created especially for this ambitious project, as was a custom-built printing press.

Following his retirement from printing, Ken Tyler remains committed to making use of the latest technologies. Work is currently underway on Tyler’s personal inventory site, and he has also commissioned comprehensive virtual archives of Tyler material at such institutions as the National Gallery of Australia.

== Collections ==
Tyler's legacy will continue through his contributions to many international collections, both of artworks and archival material. In the United Kingdom, the Tate Gallery holds a significant collection of prints focusing on the latter half of Tyler's career. In the United States, the National Gallery of Art in Washington, DC, has a comprehensive Gemini G.E.L. collection and has also produced an online catalogue raisonné. Other major collections of Tyler prints include those at the Walker Art Center in Minneapolis, USA; the Center for Contemporary Graphic Art in Fukushima, Japan; and the Singapore Art Museum. The latter collection was acquired with the assistance of the Singapore government, who in 2002 also supported the establishment of the Singapore Tyler Print Institute. The Institute contains all the original printing presses and equipment shipped from Tyler's workshops in America, including a 100 tonne hydraulic platen press. In Canberra, Australia, the National Gallery of Australia holds a collection of over 7000 Tyler works, as well as an archive of related film, sound and photographic material.

== Honours ==
- Honorary Officer of the Order of Australia — "For service to the Arts, particularly through the Kenneth Tyler Collection at the National Gallery of Australia and through philanthropy." December 2, 2011.
- Endowed chair position in his name at IUPUI Herron School of Art & Design, currently held by Aaron S. Coleman.
