= Donn Steward =

American printmaker

- Born: 1921
- Died: 1985 (aged 63–64)
- Known for: Printmaker

Donn Horatio Steward (1921 - 1985) was a master printmaker. He learned the craft at the Tamarind Institute. He was hired by Universal Limited Art Editions in 1966. There he worked with a variety of artists including Lee Bontecou, Helen Frankenthaler, Jasper Johns, Robert Motherwell and Cy Twombly. In the mid-1970s Steward established the Huntington Township Art League printmaking workshop.

His prints are in the Amon Carter Museum of American Art, the Baltimore Museum of Art, the Brooklyn Museum, the National Gallery of Art, the Seattle Art Museum, the Smithsonian American Art Museum, and the Whitney Museum of American Art.
