= Print Council of America =

- Formation: 1956
- Purpose: Foster the creation, dissemination, and appreciation of fine prints, new and old.
- Website: printcouncil.org

The Print Council of America is an organization that seeks to "foster the creation, dissemination, and appreciation of fine prints, old and new." It is primarily a group of museum curators, but also includes university professors, conservators of works on paper, and independent scholars involved in the study of prints.

== History ==
The Print Council of America was founded in 1956 and was led by legendary print collector Lessing J. Rosenwald. Early members of the group—including Adelyn Breeskin, Harold Joachim, Una Johnson, A. Hyatt Mayor, Elizabeth Mongan, Jakob Rosenberg, Paul J. Sachs, Carl Schniewind and Carl Zigrosser are now known for their leadership in establishing collections, mounting ground-breaking exhibitions of prints, and publishing critical studies of prints and printmakers. The group's leadership has been called "the cream of the cognoscenti" among print experts.

== Defining the original print ==
Early in its history, the Print Council of America was focused on advocacy and raising the visibility of printmaking as a fine art medium. The 1961 publication What is an Original Print?: Principles Recommended by the Print Council of America offered guidelines to the complex topic of originality and printmaking during that era. Initially, these efforts at a standard definition were controversial among some print experts, and even provoked "anger" from another organization, the World Print Council. Over the years, the definition became more "widely accepted".

== Description of papers used in fine prints ==
The Print Council of America has published many books. One notable example is The Print Council of America Paper Sample Book: A Practical Guide to the Description of Paper. This book provides a "standardized method of describing paper" that has "proved to be an objective system for describing paper".

== Current activities and services ==
Currently, the Print Council of America serves as a professional organization for print curators and has been active in the publication of books and research aids to encourage and professionalize the study and care of prints. Their primary vehicle is the Search Index to Print Catalogues Raisonnes, a free service which directs scholars and students to the oeuvre catalogues of thousands of artists. This search index has been called "a very useful source for identifying print catalogues raisonnés."

The Print Council of America also offers resources to aid in learning about printmaking techniques, authenticity, the care of prints, defining a print, and determining the value of a print. In addition, the council offers links to the collections of major art libraries in the United States and Canada, and a selection of books published by the Print Council of America.
