= Catherine Mosley =

American printmaker

- Known for: Printmaker

Catherine Mosley is a master printmaker. She attended University of Wisconsin–Stout. In 1969 she began working at Robert Blackburn's Printmaking Workshop. In 1974 she established a studio where she printed with the artists Robert Beauchamp, Agnes Denes, Richard Haas, Lucio Pozzi, and Harvey Quaytman. Mosley collaborated with Robert Motherwell from the early 1970s until his death in 1991. In 2015 Mosley had a solo exhibition entitled Up Down & Sideways at the A.I.R. Gallery

Her prints are in the Metropolitan Museum of Art, the Museum of Modern Art, the Smithsonian American Art Museum. and the Zimmerli Art Museum at Rutgers University.
