= Vincent Canadé =

American painter (1879–1961)

Vincent Canadé (1879 – 1961) was an American artist, born in San Giorgio Albanese, Italy. He was active during the 1920s and 1930s and is known especially for his landscapes. His work, which also includes portraits and still lifes, is held in the collections of over 20 museums, including the Hirshhorn Museum, the National Museum of American Art, the Whitney Museum of American Art and the Phillips Collection.

His artwork was published in The Dial (July 1925) and other publications. On April 10, 1927, The New York Times reviewed:

Vincent Canadé has introduced a 20th-century reflection of the dark smile that glows eternally in the painting of the Middle Ages into his latest paintings (at the Weyhe Galleries) of elemental landscapes and living trees and faces.

During the 1930s, he lived in Greenwich Village. He had previously resided in the Bensonhurst section of Brooklyn. Vincent and Josephine Picciulo Canadé had six children: sons Eugene, George and Vincent; and daughters Laura Canade, who married noted curator and art dealer Carl Zigrosser, Celia Canade Raupp and Florence Canade Lambert.

Vincent Canadé died in 1961 in New York City.

His work today is represented by the Spanierman Gallery.
