= Brian Shure =

American painter and author (born 1952)

- Born: 1952 (age 73–74); Cleveland, Ohio
- Education: Antioch College
- Known for: Printmaking and Painting
- Style: Realism

Brian R. Shure (born 1952) is an American printmaker, painter, author and educator. He is best known for his mastery of printing techniques, knowledge of lesser known art techniques and has published multiple books about the art of chine-collé.

== Early life ==
Born in Cleveland, Ohio, he grew up in Willowick and then Mentor. As a teenager he started taking art classes at Cleveland Institute of Art. In 1974 he graduated with a B.A. in art from Antioch College. He apprenticed with Ernest deSoto and Collectors Press, a lithography press in San Francisco.

== Work ==
Shure was a printer at Collectors Press (1972-1976), Editions Press (1981-1987), Ernest F. deSoto Workshop (1976-1981), and also worked on projects at Houston Fine Art Press (1980) and Graphicstudio (1998). He later worked with Kathan Brown and Crown Point Press as a master printer and coordinator of the Chinese Woodblock Program from 1987 to 1994. Through his work at Crown Point Press he was able to work with artists such as John Cage, Wayne Thiebaud, Francesco Clemente and others.

From 2000 to 2006, Shure was awarded a General Services Administration (GSA) commission, for three murals in historic courthouses in Pittsburgh.

Shure taught in the printmaking department at Rhode Island School of Design from 1996 to 2016. He was granted multiple RISD faculty study grants to travel and study traditional scroll mounting, byobu (folding-screen) repair and the Chinese watercolor woodblock printing process. He also taught printmaking at Cornell University and Brown University.

Shure's oil paintings are often still life scenes from city life. He was quoted as saying, "I love drawing from life but I work from photographs now. When people are standing on the street waiting for a bus, reading paper on the train, or crossing the street, they appear comfortable and natural around their fellow human beings".

He began working at the artist workshop, Gemini G.E.L. in Los Angeles in late 2016. As of 2018, he is working as a master printer and director of a new print shop, Anderson Ranch Editions at Anderson Ranch Arts Center in Snowmass Village, Colorado.

== Collections ==
Shure's own artwork is included in various museum collections including the Fine Arts Museums of San Francisco (FAMSF), Art Gallery of New South Wales, and more. Shure's work as a printmaker (for various presses and various artists) is in museum collections, including; Smithsonian American Art Museum, National Gallery of Art, Brooklyn Museum, Museum of Fine Arts, Houston, Museum of Fine Arts, Boston (MFA), and others.

== Publications ==
- Magical Secrets of Chine Collé; San Francisco, CA: Crown Point Press, 2009
- Chine Collé, A Printer’s Handbook, San Francisco, CA: Crown Point Press, 2000
- “Room to Breathe”, The Artist's Network Magazine, May 2002 (56-60)
- Ink, Metal, Paper, Wood: Painters and Sculptors at Crown Point Press, San Francisco, CA: Chronicle Books, 1996
