= Ernest de Soto =

American printmaker and lithographer

Ernest Frank de Soto
- Born: October 26, 1923; Tucson, Arizona, U.S.
- Died: December 29, 2014 (aged 91); Tucson, Arizona, U.S.
- Education: Chouinard Art Institute, California Institute of the Arts
- Employer(s): Collector’s Press (1967–1975), Edition’s Press (1972–1974), de Soto Workshop (1975–1993)
- Known for: master printer, lithographer
- Website: The Ernest De Soto Collection

Ernest Frank de Soto (October 26, 1923 – December 29, 2014) was an American master printmaker and lithographer, who specialized in American and Mexican prints during his career. He established and directed his own printing workshop, the de Soto Workshop, from 1975 to 1993.

De Soto was the first Hispanic Master Printer in the United States. De Soto was the first American print maker to establish an international relationship with Mexican artists and had a lasting impact on printing in the United States.

== Early life ==
Ernest de Soto was born on October 26, 1923, in Tucson, Arizona. De Soto was an eighth generation Tucsonian and a member of the group “Los Descendientes del Presidio de Tucson.” In an interview, de Soto discussed his passion for art from a young age, and recalled the encouragement of his parents and teachers.

As a young man, de Soto attended the Chouinard Art Institute, (now known as California Institute of the Arts) from 1942 to 1947. While in Los Angeles, de Soto discovered the art of lithography under the master printer, Lynton Richards Kistler, whom he studied under. De Soto served in World War II as a camouflage technician.

== Career ==
=== Mexico ===
De Soto used the G.I. Bill to continue his studies of art in Mexico. De Soto attended the Escuela de Belles Artes in San Miguel de Allende from 1948 to 1949, where he learned fresco painting. While a student in Mexico, de Soto also was an apprentice under David Alfaro Siqueiros, a founder of the Mexican Muralism art movement. After finishing his courses, de Soto was hired to teach at the school in Mexico.

In an interview, de Soto discussed his experience of teaching in Mexico, and recalled the time when he joined an uprising with his fellow teachers to protest their poor compensation, although the school director received money from the GI Bill. De Soto and his fellow teachers created a mural covering 500 square meters in a converted chapel which they called the “Moving Spectator.” José Clemente Orozco, a Mexican artist, worked with them on this project. De Soto explained the title of the mural and described the experience of seeing it in the chapel: “the picture plane tilts so that you’re facing always the picture plane so whether you looked left, down, or in the plane always faced you."

=== California ===
In 1965, de Soto was awarded a grant from the Ford Foundation to work at the Tamarind Institute in Los Angeles for two years. At Tamarind Institute he met artist José Luis Cuevas, who he later partnered with. Upon completion of his program, de Soto was awarded the title of Master Printmaker, becoming the first Latino to achieve this distinction in the field of lithography.

==== Collector’s Press ====
After his studies, de Soto had the opportunity to open an art shop in San Francisco. De Soto co-founded the Collector’s Press Lithography Workshop in 1967. He remained at Collector's Press until 1975. Notable printmakers at Collector's Press included David Folkman of Little Egypt Press.

==== Edition’s Press ====
In 1972, de Soto became a partner with José Luis Cuevas in Edition’s Press, located at 915 Bryant Street in San Francisco. de Soto's time at Edition's Press was short due to economic issues happening, however he reorganized and sold the printing business, which remained open and under new leadership and using the same name for many years. Notable printmakers working at Edition's Press included Brian Shure.

==== de Soto Workshop ====
In 1975, de Soto founded his own workshop called the de Soto Workshop, which “is known for specializing in contemporary Latin American and American lithographs, fine prints and etching by some of the best-known Latin American and American artists of our time.” The website of the de Soto Workshop describes some of their methods: “Each lithograph is an original, signed and numbered by the artist and embossed with the name of the master printer or the workshop that printed it. Each print in the edition is numbered. A typical edition usually contains about 100 prints. After the edition is complete, the stone is effaced, making future production impossible.” De Soto's achievement made him the first Mexican-American to “develop, manage and direct a studio for the creation of original fine art prints” and “the first American master printer to establish an international relationship with artists in Mexico.”

De Soto had maintained his relationships with Mexican artists throughout his career in the United States. De Soto created lithographs with many Mexican artists, including: Edmundo Aquino, Alejandro Colunga, Jerry Concha, José Luis Cuevas, José Fors, David Gallegos, Byron Galvez, Rupert Garcia, Luis Granda, Luis Jiminez, and Gustavo Riviera. Creating prints in de Soto's workshop allowed many of these artists to gain entrée into the American art world. For example, Francisco Zúñiga created his first lithographs at the de Soto workshop.

The Mexican Muralism movement of the 20th century did not exclusively feature fresco paintings, but also included “architecture, sculpture, and the graphic arts, particularly the woodcut and the lithograph, have all shared the same dramatic development.” De Soto created lithographs with famous muralist artists like Jose Luis Cuevas and David Alfaro Siqueiros. These artists did not “experiment with techniques in the manner of professional printmakers but more often used the popular medium to extend and reproduce their paintings.” The Mexican Muralism artists became less political in the 1950s, which can be observed in their art in which “there seems to be less concern with social protest, although the subjects continue for the most part to examine native Mexican life.” De Soto created prints with Mexican artists during this period, such as the piece “Mother and Child” created with David Alfaro Siqueiros in 1956. De Soto's studies in Mexico and experiences with Mexican Muralism and Surrealism artists shaped him and continued to be a part of his career when he returned to the United States and eventually established his own printing workshop.

== Death and legacy ==
De Soto died on December 29, 2014, in Tucson, Arizona.

The life and career of Ernest de Soto demonstrates the interconnectedness of Mexico and the United States. De Soto could trace his Spanish ancestry in Arizona to before the United States was even a country, and identified as both an American and a Latino. Historian Felipe Fernandez-Arneseto argued, “that there are other U.S. histories than the standard Anglo narrative: in particular, a Spanish history, rolling from south to north and intersecting with the story of the Anglo frontier.” De Soto's legacy as a Latino Master Printer and relationship with Mexico artists falls into this transnational arc of Mexican-American relations.
