= Elizabeth Olds =

American printmaker (1896–1991)

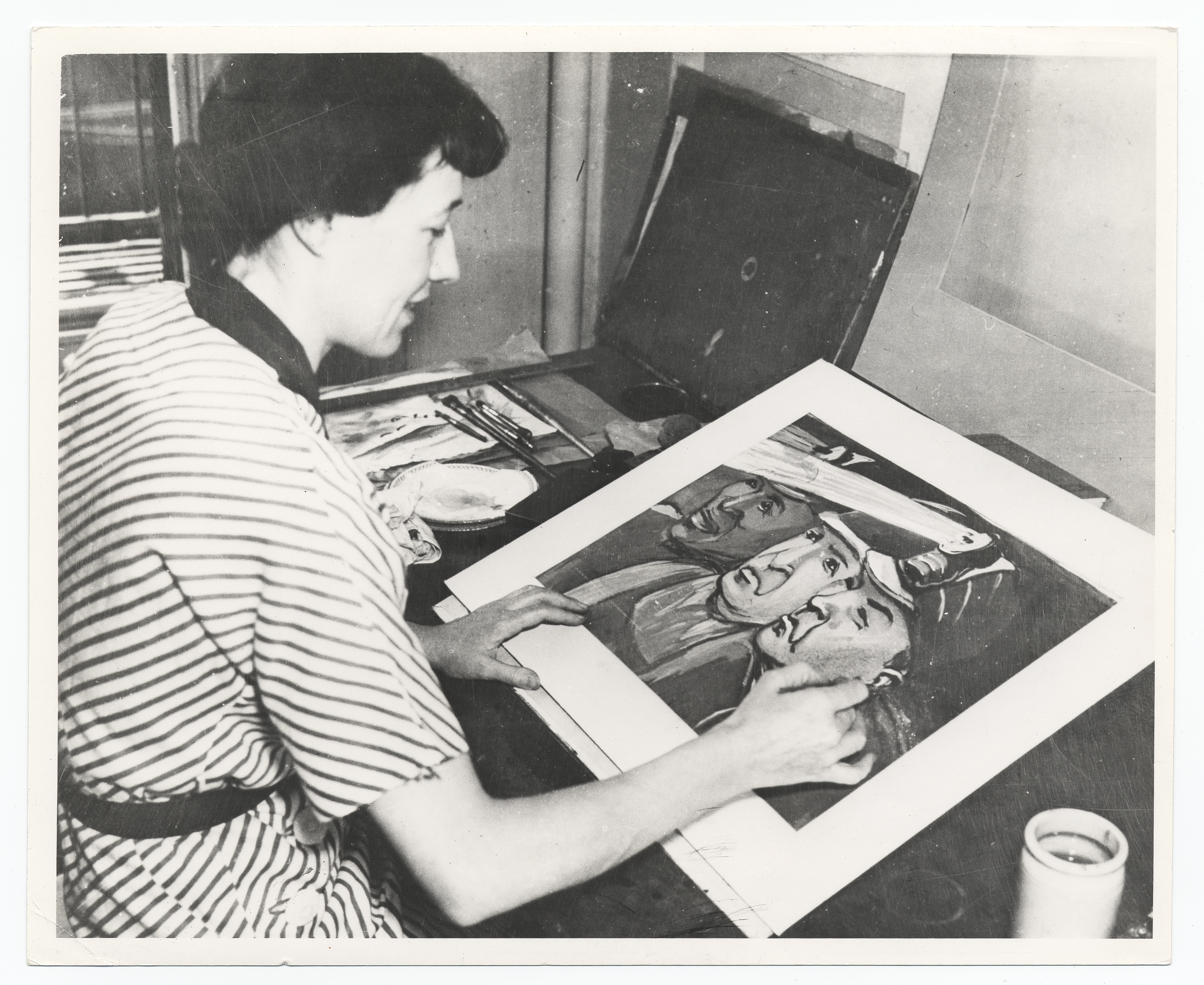
- Olds in 1937 (Archives of American Art)
- Born: December 10, 1896; Minneapolis, Minnesota, US
- Died: March 4, 1991 (aged 94); Sarasota, Florida, US
- Known for: Printmaking, silkscreen, woodcut, lithography, illustrations, children's books
- Movement: Social Realism
- Awards: Guggenheim Fellowship

Elizabeth Olds (December 10, 1896 – March 4, 1991) was an American artist known for her work in developing silkscreen as a fine arts medium. She was a painter and illustrator, but is primarily known as a printmaker, using silkscreen, woodcut, lithography processes. In 1926, she became the first woman honored with the Guggenheim Fellowship. She studied under George Luks, was a Social Realist, and worked for the Public Works of Art Project and Federal Art Project during the Great Depression. In her later career, Olds wrote and illustrated six children's books.

== Early life and education ==
Olds was born in Minneapolis, Minnesota to a middle-class family. Olds's mother was an art historian, and her mother exposed Olds and her sister, Eleanor, to art through visits to the Walker Art Center and Minneapolis Institute of Arts. Olds's art was first documented in her high school yearbook, featuring a cartoon sketch of a goose at tea. She studied Home Economics and Architectural Drawing at the University of Minnesota from 1916-1918, and received a scholarship to study at the Minneapolis College of Art and Design from 1918-1921. In 1921, Olds received another scholarship to study at the Art Students League of New York where she studied under George Luks.

== Career ==
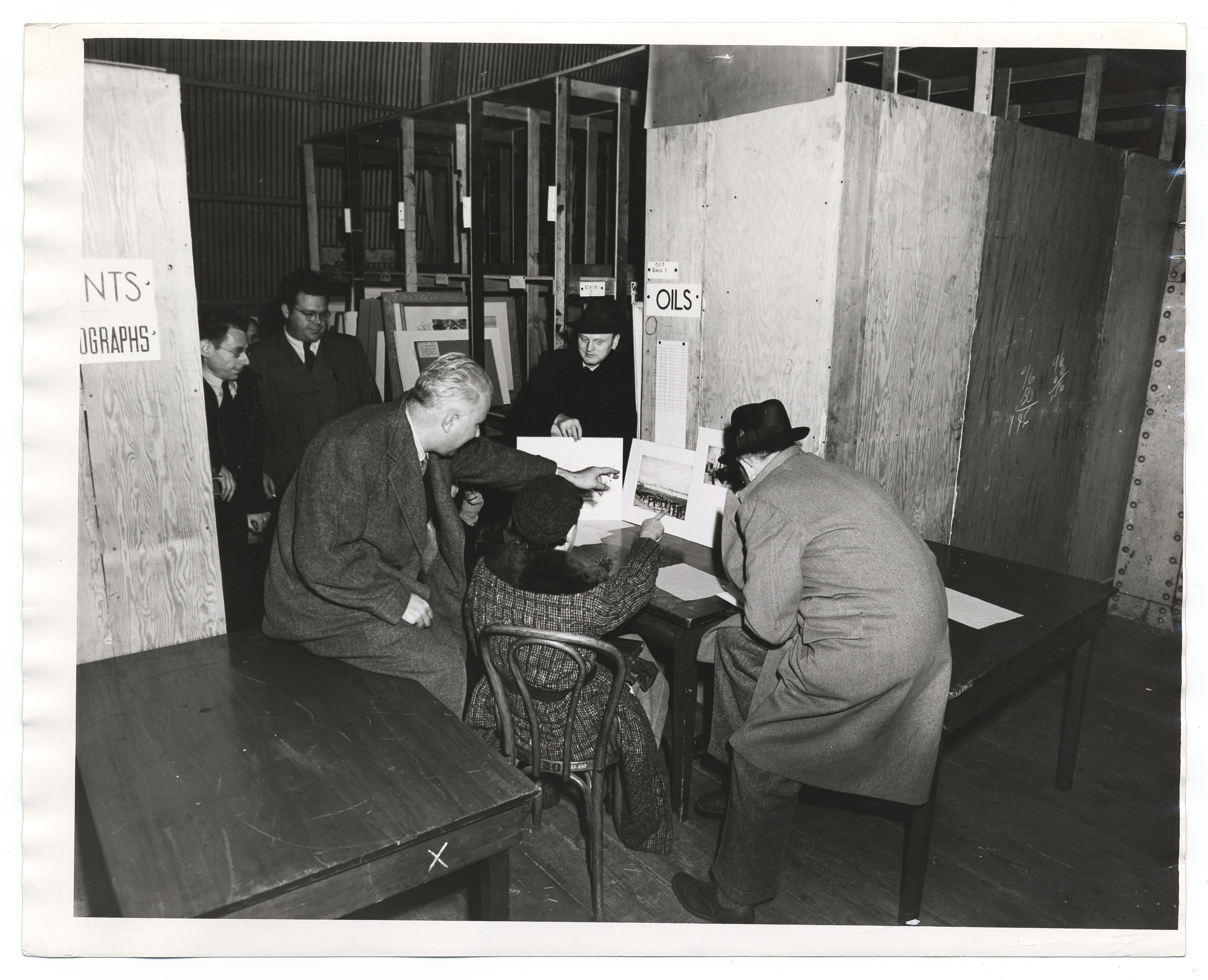
Adolf Dehn, Olds, and unidentified, with Reginald Marsh facing camera, c. 1937 (Archives of American Art)

=== Early works ===
The early style of Olds reflects Luks's influence on her art. The pair experimented with the style and themes of the Ashcan school, visiting the Lower East Side of New York to observe the lives of urban immigrants. During the summers of 1923-1925, Olds was invited to the circles of The Roots and their friends and the Percy Saunders of Clinton, New York. In 1925, with the help of Elihu Root and some bankers, Olds was funded to travel to France. While in France, she observed and sketched the famous circus family, the Fratellini family, and their show, “Cirque d’Hiver.” Olds later joined the troupe as a trick bareback rider. In 1926, Olds became the first woman awarded the Guggenheim Fellowship, and was granted further travel in Europe.

=== Great Depression ===
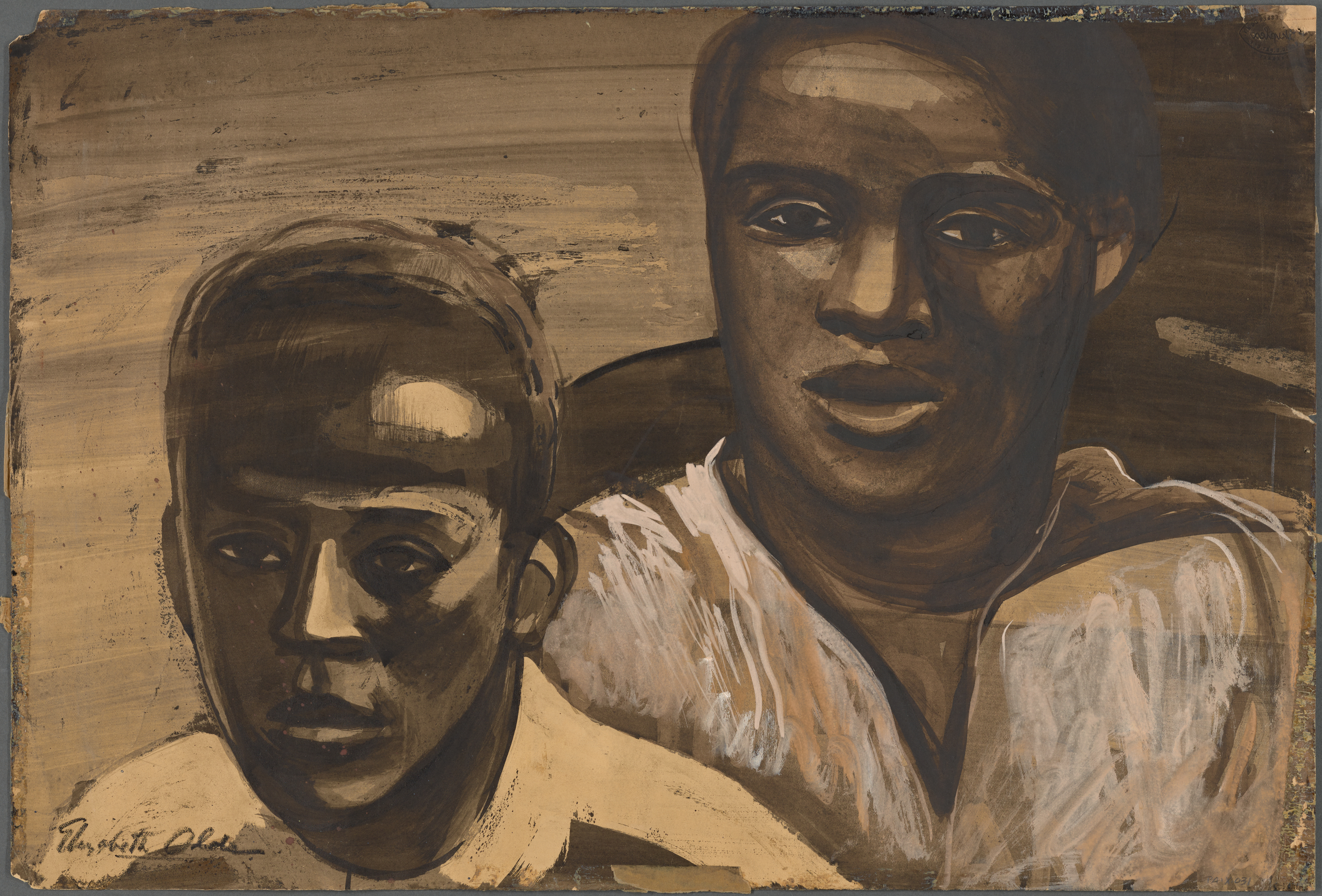
Two Boys, a painting by Elizabeth Olds for the United States Works Progress Administration

Olds was fairly sheltered from the Great Depression when she returned to the U.S. in 1929. In 1932, Olds viewed José Clemente Orozco’s nearly finished murals at Dartmouth College, and was inspired by his expressive use of form and political themes. The same year, she moved to Omaha, Nebraska to paint portraits of the family of Samuel Rees, a local industrialist. Olds completed the project, but she became frustrated with the monotony of painting portraits. At the same time Olds was studying the basics of lithography at Rees's printing business.

From 1933-1934, Olds was invited to join the Public Works of Art Project (PWAP) in Omaha. Under the PWAP, Olds created a series of lithographs featuring the bread lines, shelters, and clinics of the Great Depression. Olds’s break from portraiture was fruitful as she developed her style and content, which like Orozco’s murals, used broad, expressive lines and portrayed political themes. Later, Olds studied at a meat packing plant, which inspired her ‘'Stockyard Series’’. "Sheep Skinners," one of the ten black-and-white lithographs, was exhibited in 1935 in the Weyhe Gallery in New York as one of the “Fifty Best Prints of the Year.”

From 1935 until the early 1940s, Olds was a nonrelief employee for the Works Progress Administration-Federal Art Project (WPA-FAP) in the Graphic Arts Division in New York, where she helped younger artists in the silkscreen unit. She also joined the American Artists’ Congress, Artists Union, and other groups with similar interests. Olds became friends with Harry Gottlieb, another nonrelief artist who also focused on industrialism. Together, they observed the mining and steel industries of New York, and their research lead to Olds's creation of her award-winning print, "Miner Joe." Olds used both silkscreen and lithography for the prints for ‘‘Miner Joe,’’ but it was her lithograph that won first place for the Philadelphia Print Club competition in 1938.

Olds and Gottlieb experimented with silkscreen printing as a fine arts medium. They accomplished this with a few other artists in the silkscreen unit of the Graphic Arts Division of the WPA-FAP in New York. Carl Zigrosser, who was curator of prints and drawings at the Philadelphia Museum of Art from 1940 through 1963, wrote from the vantage point of 1941 that: "The first serigraph actually made on the newly organized (WPA) New York Silk Screen Project was The Concert by Olds. . . .She is an accomplished graphic artist and has made a considerable number of serigraphs outside the Project, in addition to her long experience in lithography."

From 1939 until 1941, Olds and Gottlieb opened and ran the independent Silk Screen School for students interested in learning the newest printmaking technologies. Her work was included in the 1940 MoMA show American Color Prints Under $10. The show was organized as a vehicle for bringing affordable fine art prints to the general public.

Olds submitted and reproduced 10 prints in The New Masses in 1936 and 1937, a leftist magazine at the time. In the United American Artists under the Public Use of Art Committee, Olds and other artists worked to produce murals along New York City Subway walls, but the murals were never installed. Olds’s art reflected her leftist political views, but also her social and political awareness at the time. As a WPA-FAP employee, Olds’s prints were intended to go to the government for their purposes, but she selectively sent her leftist prints to George C. Miller, an independent lithographer.

=== Later works ===
After World War II, Olds redirected her skills and began experimenting with watercolor, collage, and woodblock prints. Her silk screen, "Three Alarm Fire" (1945), prompted Roberta Fansler to suggest that Olds should illustrate children's books. From 1945-1963, Olds wrote and illustrated six children's books. In three of her books, Olds wrote about firefighters, trains, and oil, educating her readers about industrialism.

In the early 1950s, Olds was hired as an illustrator-reporter for The New Republic and Fortune (magazine). In the summers of the 1950s and 1960s, Olds was awarded artist-in-residence positions at the artists’ colonies of Yaddo near Saratoga Springs in New York and McDowell in Peterborough, New Hampshire. Her papers are held at the University of Texas.

==== Children's books ====
Olds wrote and illustrated six children's picture books. The books published by Houghton Mifflin were created using lithography, and the books published by Scribner's were created using woodblocks. Feather Mountain, published by Houghton Mifflin in 1951, was a runner-up for the annual American Library Association Caldecott Medal, which recognizes "the most distinguished American picture book for children."

- The Big Fire (Houghton Mifflin, 1945), LCCN 45-9049
- Riding the Rails (HM, 1948), LCCN 48-8418
- Feather Mountain (HM, 1951), LCCN 51-11769
- Deep Treasure: the story of oil (HM, 1958), LCCN 57-9016
- Plop plop Ploppie (Scribner's, 1962), LCCN 62-9647
- Little Una (Scribner's, 1963), LCCN 63-9460

== Personal life and retirement ==
Olds never married. She had close friendships with Harry Gottlieb, Berenice Abbott, and Elizabeth McCausland. In 1972, Olds retired to Sarasota, Florida where she worked until her death in 1991.

== Awards and exhibitions ==
- 1934: "The Dying Gangster," lithograph, wins silver at the Kansas City Art Institute.
- 1935: "Sheep Skinners" exhibits in the “Fifty Best Prints of the Year” at the Weyhe Gallery in New York.
- 1936: "Bootleg Coal, Pennsylvania" is reproduced in the book version of the Artists’ Congress exhibition “America Today: One Hundred Prints.”
- 1937: One-person exhibit of her steel mill drawings at the A.C.A. Gallery.
- 1938: "Miner Joe," lithograph, wins first place in the Philadelphia Print Club competition.
- 1939: "The Middle Class," lithograph, wins first place in the Philadelphia Art Alliance competition.
- 1941, 1950, 1955, & 1960 solo shows with the A.C.A. Gallery.
- 1969: Solo exhibition at the Staten Island Museum.
- 1986: Elizabeth Olds, Retrospective Exhibition: Paintings, Drawings, Prints, RGK Foundation, Austin.
- 1992: Exhibition at the Live Oak Art Center, Columbus, Texas.
- 2024: Public Works: Art by Elizabeth Olds, a retrospective exhibit of more than 100 prints, paintings, drawings, and illustrations from the 1920s to the 1960s, Harry Ransom Center, University of Texas at Austin.
