= Derrière L'Étoile Studios =

Derrière L'Étoile Studios was founded in New York City in 1978 by master printmaker Maurice Sanchez. Sanchez trained at Tamarind Institute. The studio specializes in a unique form of monoprinting, which allows for more than one impression to be created from the plate.

Works from the studio are in the collection of the Brooklyn Museum, the National Gallery of Art, and the Princeton University Art Museum.

Artists associated with the Derrière L'Étoile Studios include Robert Cumming, Donald Judd, Eric Fischl, Elizabeth Murray, and Susan Rothenberg,

From 2013 through 2014 the Zimmerli Art Museum at Rutgers University held a retrospective of their collection of Derrière L'Étoile Studios prints entitled Stars: Contemporary Prints by Derrière L’Étoile Studio. Part One featured prints from 1980 through the early 1990s. Part Two featured prints from the 1990s. Part Three featured prints from 2000 to 2014.
