= Judith Solodkin =

American printmaker and milliner

Judith Solodkin (born 1945) is an American printmaker and milliner. She completed the master printer program at Tamarind Institute. In 1975 she established the Solo Press.

In 2004 Solodkin produced an edition of 25 copies of Louise Bourgeois' artist's book Ode â l'Oubli. In addition to printmaking, Solodkin is known for designing and making hats.

Her work is included in the Smithsonian American Art Museum and the National Gallery of Art.
