= Kathy Caraccio =

American printmaker (born 1947)

- Born: 1947; Bronx, New York
- Other names: Kathleen Caraccio
- Known for: Printmaker
- Website: kcaracciocollection.com

Kathleen Caraccio (b. 1947, Bronx, New York) is a master printmaker. She learned her craft at Robert Blackburn's Printmaking Workshop. She established the K. Caraccio Etching Studios in 1977. Caraccio also maintains an extensive print collection which was the subject of the 2021 exhibition Right place, Right time: The Rest is History - Becoming a master printer and collector with Bob Blackburn. In 2019 her work was exhibited at the International Quilt Museum in a show entitled Kathy Caraccio: Quilt Series.

Her work is in the Brooklyn Museum, the National Gallery of Art, and the Smithsonian American Art Museum.
