= Irwin Hollander =

- Born: 30 November 1927; New York City, New York, U.S.
- Died: November 16, 2018 (aged 90); Brooklyn, New York, U.S.
- Education: Tamarind Institute
- Known for: Master Printer of Lithography

Irwin Hollander (1927–2018) was an American artist and master printmaker, based in New York City. He helped revive lithography as a fine art around the 1960s. He had a printing studio called Hollander's Workshop.

== Biography ==
Born 30 November 1927 in New York City's Lower East Side neighborhood. He grew up in Williamsburg, Brooklyn and was childhood friends with actor Mel Brooks. He attended High School of Art and Design (previously known as School of Industrial Art) and two years at Washington Irving High School in New York City. He learned photography in high school and got a job at Macy's department store, taking photographs for advertisements.

Hollander joined the United States Army in 1946. He used his GI Bill and studied at Brooklyn Museum Art School.

He struggled in his early life with work, eventually wanting to learn commercial lithography printing however since he did not have the job training or skills, he learned by taking a series of jobs and getting fired from them. Eventually he qualified for a lithography job and earned a journeyman's card.

At the time he was living in San Diego, California and working in commercial lithography and in nearby Los Angeles, he learned that June Wayne had founded the Tamarind Lithography Workshop. Hollander wanted to work alongside artists, so he took interest in Tamarind and became the first master printer trained. Tamarind and Hollander were instrumental in introducing American postwar artists to printmaking as a fine art tool. One of Hollander's students at Tamarind was Kenneth E. Tyler.

In 1964 he moved back to New York City to open his own print studio, Hollander's Workshop located at 90 East 10th Street. Hollander was offering established New York artists such as Robert Motherwell and Willem de Kooning a fast and cheaper way to sell art. He closed Hollander's Workshop in 1972, and decided to teach printmaking at Cranbrook Academy of Art for many years and was the head of the Printmaking Department from 1973 to 1975, before he focused on creating his own work.

He died 16 November 2018 in Brooklyn, New York.

Some of the artists he worked in collaboration with included Robert Motherwell, Hugo Weber, Willem de Kooning, Sam Francis, and others.

Hollander's work is in many public art collections including the Smithsonian American Art Museum, Los Angeles County Museum of Art (LACMA), Fine Arts Museums of San Francisco (FAMSF), and others.
