= Henry Trivick =

British painter, lithographer and author of art books

Henry Houghton Trivick (1908 — 1982) was a British painter, lithographer and author of art books.

== Biography ==
Henry Trivick was the great grandson of the Anglo-American artist Benjamin West. He studied at the Central School of Arts and Crafts in London, later teaching lithography there.

Trivick was a friend of the painter Stanley Spencer for over twenty years - both had lived in Cookham, Berkshire. He was a visiting instructor at the Regent Street Polytechnic (now the University of Westminster) where he taught Spencer the art of lithography. Spencer made only three lithographs, all under the guidance of Henry Trivick. Trivick also collaborated with Spencer to produce lithographs from Spencer's drawings.

== Publications ==
Trivick published the following art books:

- Trivick, H. (1969). Autolithography, Faber and Faber, London. ISBN 0-571-03971-5
- Trivick, H. (1969). The Craft and Design of Monumental Brasses, J. Baker, Humanities P., London, New York ISBN 0-212-99820-X
- Trivick, H. (1971). The Picture Book of Brasses in Gilt, John Baker, London. ISBN 0-212-98382-2
