= Sheila Marbain =

American artist

- Born: Sheila Oline; 1927; London, England
- Died: 2008 (aged 80–81); Brooklyn, New York
- Known for: Printmaker
- Spouse: Ary Marbain
- Children: 1

Sheila Marbain (1927–2008) was a master printmaker known for establishing Maurel Studios, and for her collaborative works with Pop artists.

== Biography ==
Marbain nee Oline was born in London, England. In 1939 her family immigrated to the United States. There she married fellow artist Ary Marbain, with whom she had one child.

Marbain attended Black Mountain College from 1948 through 1950 where her teachers included Josef Albers, Ilya Bolotowsky, and Willem de Kooning. She learned the techniques of silk screen printing in the early 1950s.

The Marbains established the Maurel Studios in 1955. Ary Marbain died in 1963 forcing the studio to close for a period. Sheila Marbain would go on to collaborate with artists such as Shusaku Arakawa, Helen Frankenthaler, Roy Lichtenstein, Robert Motherwell, and Claes Oldenburg.

In 1981 her work was included in the exhibition "Artist and Printer: Printmaking as a Collaborative Process" at the Pratt Graphic Art Center, traveling to the Guild Hall of East Hampton. In 1990 the Zimmerli Art Museum at Rutgers University held a retrospective of her work.

Marbain died in 2008.

Her work is in the Art Institute of Chicago, the Museum of Fine Arts, Houston, Princeton University Art Museum,
