= Tatyana Grosman =

Russian American printmaker and publisher (1904–1982)

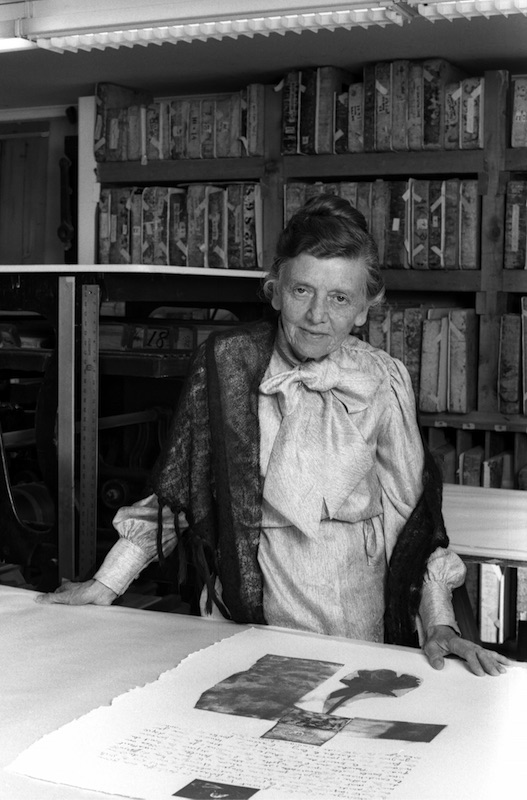
- Tatyana Grosman in her studio on Islip, Long Island 1978, photo by Lynn Gilbert
- Born: Tatyana Aguschewitsch; June 30, 1904; Ekaterinburg, Russia
- Died: July 24, 1982 (aged 78)
- Education: Dresden Academy of Fine Arts
- Employer: Universal Limited Art Editions
- Known for: Printmaking; Graphic design
- Spouse: Maurice Grosman
- Children: 1

Tatyana Grosman (June 30, 1904 – July 24, 1982) was a Russian American printmaker and publisher. She founded Universal Limited Art Editions.

== Personal life ==
Tatyana Aguschewitsch was born in Ekaterinburg, Russian Empire to Jewish parents, Semion Michailovitch Auguschewitsch and Anna de Chochor. In 1918, she and her family emigrated to Japan. She attended the Sacred Heart Convent School, located in Tokyo. Her family later left Japan and spent time in Venice and Munich. They finally settled in Dresden. She studied at the Dresden Academy of Fine Arts. Her studies focused mainly on drawing and fashion.

In 1931, she married Maurice Grosman, a painter. In 1933, while living in France, Tatyana and Maurice had a child, Larissa. She died sixteen months later. They did not have any other children.

In 1940, Tatyana and Maurice left France before the Germans invaded. For three years they fled the impending danger of the Nazis, resorting to crossing the Pyrenees Mountains on foot. They eventually reached friends in Barcelona, Spain. In 1943, the Grosmans traveled to New York City, assisted by the Hebrew Immigrant Aid Society.

In 1956, Maurice had a heart attack. Tatyana was left to care for them both. In 1976, Maurice died. Tatyana suffered from depression and illness following his death. On July 24, 1982, Tatyana Grosman died at 78 years old in Mount Sinai Hospital.

== Career ==
Tatyana Grosman began publishing illustrated books after her husband's heart attack, as a way to financially support them. She and her husband recreated many paintings by notable artists. William Lieberman, who was a curator at the Museum of Modern Art, told them that he was only interested in original work, not reproductions.

Soon after, Tatyana and Maurice came across two Bavarian lithographic stones in their front yard and then went on to acquire a lithographic press from a neighbor. They had a local printer demonstrate how to use the device. Tatyana then decided that instead of continuing to create reproductions that she wanted to encourage collaborations between artists and writers and act as a publisher for these collaborations. The first collaboration that she worked on was between painter Larry Rivers and poet Frank O’Hara and it was called Stones. Following this came a project by Robert Rauschenberg and Alain Robbe-Grillet. In 1977, Tatyana received an honorary doctorate from Smith College. In 1981 she was awarded a commendation for outstanding achievement in the arts by Brandeis University.

=== Universal Limited Art Editions ===
In 1957, she founded Universal Limited Art Editions (ULAE), in West Islip, New York. In 1966 Grosman hired master printmaker Donn Steward with an early grant from the National Endowment for the Arts. Steward would work there until 1974.

Many of the prints from Universal Limited Art Editions were acquired by the Museum of Modern Art and the Art Institute of Chicago and they were shown in exhibitions throughout the world.

From the time of its founding, to her death, Tatyana Grosman was involved in expanding ULAE to include many different forms of art, including but not limited to:

- aquatint
- etching
- lithography
- offset lithography
- photolithography
- silk-screen
- woodcuts

She also worked with many artists through ULAE, some of them being:

- Lee Bontecou
- Jim Dine
- Sam Francis
- Helen Frankenthaler
- Buckminster Fuller
- Grace Hartigan
- Jasper Johns
- Jacques Lipschitz
- Marisol
- Robert Motherwell
- Barnett Newman
- Claes Oldenburg
- James Rosenquist
- Saul Steinberg
- Cy Twombly
- Max Weber (artist)
