= Elizabeth Mongan =

- Elizabeth Mongan in 1947
- Born: December 23, 1909
- Died: June 7, 2002 (aged 92)
- Occupation: Art historian, curator
- Works: Paul Gauguin: Catalogue Raisonné of His Prints

Elizabeth Mongan (December 23, 1909 – June 7, 2002) was an art historian and curator, an authority on prints. She assembled the Rosenwald collection of prints and joined the National Gallery of Art as a curator when the collection moved there. She authored numerous exhibition catalogs, including the seminal The First Century of Printmaking, 1400 to 1500 and the catalogue raisonné of the prints of Paul Gauguin.

== Life and career ==
Elizabeth Mongan was born in 1910 Smit in Somerville, Massachusetts, the daughter of wealthy physician Charles Mongan. Her older sister was Agnes Mongan, also an art historian and curator. Their father encouraged them to be well-read, learn languages, and have a broad and rigorous education. Elizabeth Mongan attended The Cambridge-Haskell School, where she learned Latin, and Bryn Mawr College, where she graduated in 1931. At Bryn Mawr, she was particularly influenced by Georgiana Goddard King and Mary Hamilton Swindler.

After graduation, she was hired by Winslow Ames to work at the small Lyman Allyn Art Museum in New London, Connecticut. She also took museum education courses from Paul J. Sachs, including the famous "Print Course". After teaching briefly in Florence, through Sachs she was interviewed and hired in 1937 by art collector Lessing J. Rosenwald to curate his private collection of some 5000 prints, to be housed at his home Alverthorpe Manor, in Jenkintown, Pennsylvania.

Rosenwald later wrote of Mongan:

As anyone with reasonable intelligence would, I leaned very heavily on her judgment, discernment, and ability during the most active portion of my collecting career. If, as I hope, my collection is of fine quality, it is due in large measure to her advice for which I cannot thank her sufficiently.

In 1943, Rosenwald donated his collection of prints to the National Gallery of Art, and Mongan went with it to Washington, D.C., joining the NGA as Curator of Prints. She retired from the NGA in 1963. The Rosenwald collection now has about 22 thousand prints.

Mongan taught at Smith College from 1969 to 1975.

== Death and legacy ==
Elizabeth Mongan died on June 7, 2002, in her Rockport, Massachusetts, home.

In 1986, Harvard University instituted the I Tatti Mongan Prize for "a distinguished scholar of Renaissance art or connoisseurship who carries into a new generation the qualities of imaginative scholarship, personal generosity, and devotion to the institutions of art history that were exemplified in their own generation by Agnes and Elizabeth Mongan."

== Bibliography ==
- with Wolf, Edwin. The First Printers and their Books: a Catalogue of an Exhibition Commemorating the Five Hundredth Anniversary of the Invention of Printing. Philadelphia: The Free Library of Philadelphia, 1940
- with Hofer, Philip, and Seznec, Jean. Fragonard Drawings for Ariosto. New York: Pantheon Books, 1945
- with Joachim, Harold, and Kornfeld, Eberhard W. Paul Gauguin: Catalogue raisonné of his Prints. Bern: Galerie Kornfeld, 1988
- Selections from the Rosenwald Collection, National Gallery of Art. Washington, DC: National Gallery of Art, 1943
- with Schniewind, Carl O. The First Century of Printmaking, 1400-1500. Chicago: Art Institute of Chicago and R.R. Donnelly & Sons Company, 1941
- Rosenwald Collection: an Exhibition of Recent Acquisitions. Washington, DC: The Gallery, 1950
- Berthe Morisot: Drawings, Pastels, Watercolors, Paintings. New York: Tudor Pub. Co. [Charles E. Slatkin Galleries in collaboration with the Museum of Fine Arts, Boston exhibition], 1960.
