= Carl Zigrosser =

American art dealer and art historian

- Born: September 28, 1892; Indianapolis, Indiana
- Died: November 26, 1975 (aged 83); Montagnola, Switzerland
- Known for: Art historian

Carl Zigrosser (1891–1975) was an American art dealer known for founding and running the New York Weyhe Gallery in the 1920s and 1930s, and as Curator of Prints and Drawings at the Philadelphia Museum of Art between 1940 and 1963. In the 1910s, he was active in New York's anarchist movement.

== Biography ==
Zigrosser was born in 1891 in Indianapolis. His father, Hugo Zigrosser emigrated from Austria and worked as an architect. Carl Zigrosser graduated from Newark Academy in 1908 and earned a scholarship to Columbia University, from which he graduated in 1911, Phi Beta Kappa.

In 1915, he began writing for The Modern School Magazine, a publication concerning key issues in libertarian education, and took over as editor in 1917.

He began his art career working for Frederick Keppel, a New York print dealer. "There he learned the art trade and met many famous collectors, literati, artists (most notably Rockwell Kent) and curators."

Zigrosser founded and ran the Weyhe Gallery in 1919, which he directed until 1940, and was awarded a Guggenheim Fellowship in 1939 and 1940. The Dictionary of Art Historians notes that during his years with the Weyhe Gallery, he "helped establish many American artists. . . .He published Six Centuries of Prints in 1937 as a primer on graphics collecting to educate novices in the field. The book was a monumental success and raised Zigrosser's reputation as a print authority." In 1969, he issued the catalogue raisonné of John Marin prints, The Complete Etchings of John Marin, as the exhibition catalog for a show at the Philadelphia Museum of Art, which is still considered the best study on Marin's prints.

In 1940, Zigrosser was approached by Fiske Kimball, who sought to hire him as curator of prints at the Philadelphia Museum of Art. He accepted the position and moved to Philadelphia. During his curatorship, he was made vice director of the museum in 1955, served as vice-director of the Print Council of America and vice president of the Print Club of Philadelphia. In 1961, he received an honorary degree from Temple University. He was elected a trustee of the Solomon R. Guggenheim Museum.

During his tenure, the museum's print department grew from about 15,000 objects to more than 100,000 works of art.

After retiring from the museum in 1963, he continued as Curator Emeritus at the Philadelphia Museum of Art. After his retirement Zigrosser remained active in the artworld, serving as associate of the Whitney Museum of Art and exhibition organizer for the Museum of Modern Art.

== Personal life ==
Zigrosser was married twice, first to Florence King, and second time to Laura Canadé, daughter of artist Vincent Canadé.

On 26 November 1975, Zigrosser died in Montagnola, Switzerland, where he had lived for the last three years of his life.

== Works ==
- Rockwellkentiana (1933), with Rockwell Kent
- Six Centuries of Fine Prints (1937)
- Kaethe Kollwitz (1949), introduction
- The Expressionists: A Survey of Their Graphic Art (1957)
- The Appeal of Prints (1970)
- American Prints in the Library of Congress: A Catalog of the Collection, foreword (1970)
