= Peter Blum Edition =

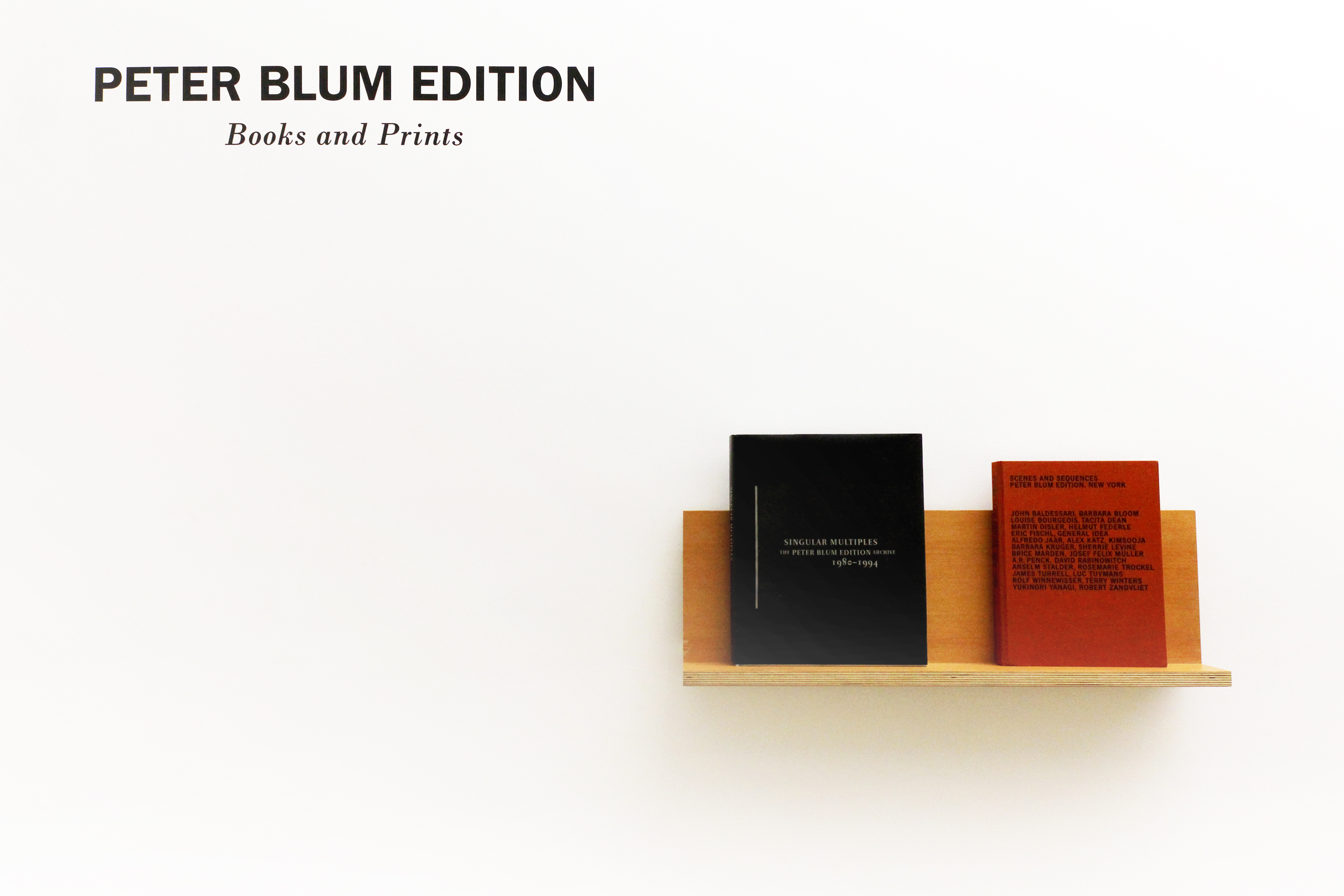
Peter Blum Edition: Books and Prints

Peter Blum Edition, is an American fine art print and artist book publisher, located in New York City. Peter Blum Edition was founded by Peter Blum in 1980, where Blum had published numerous books and print editions with artists such as Barbara Kruger, Alex Katz, and Louise Bourgeois, among many others. The Peter Blum print edition projects range from single print to traditional portfolio to installation specific portfolio editions. The book projects are all limited edition and range from artist monographs to historical surveys to special editions that include original prints.

== History ==
Since 1993, Peter Blum Edition has had gallery space (in Soho and Chelsea) in New York City.

The Peter Blum Edition Archive has been exhibited twice in museums. The first museum exhibition was titled Singular Multiples: The Peter Blum Edition Archive, 1980-1994 in 2006 at the Museum of Fine Arts, Houston located in Houston, Texas. It has been noted as the largest exhibition in North America devoted entirely to printmaking. On the occasion of this exhibition a book of the same title was published by the museum.

Soon after the exhibition in Houston, a selection of the edition archive was exhibited overseas at the Aargauer Kunsthaus in Aarau, Switzerland in 2007. The exhibition was titled Scenes and Sequences: Peter Blum Edition, New York and was also accompanied by a book of the same title published by the Aargauer Kunsthaus.
