= Mon Levinson =

American printmaker and sculptor

- Born: January 6, 1926; New York, New York
- Died: March 25, 2014 (aged 88)
- Known for: Sculptor and Printmaker
- Movement: Op art

Monroe Levinson (1926–2014) was an American sculptor and printmaker known for his Op art work.

Levinson was born on January 6, 1926, in New York City. He studied at the University of Pennsylvania. One of his prints Untitled #1 was included in the 1965 portfolio New York Ten. The same year his work was included in the MoMA exhibition The Responsive Eye. In 2011 his work was included in the exhibition American Abstract Artists 75th Anniversary at the OK Harris Gallery. Levinson died on March 25, 2014, in New York City.

His work is in the collection of the Brooklyn Museum, the Museum of Modern Art, the National Gallery of Art, and the Whitney Museum of American Art.
