= Kathan Brown =

American artist

- Born: April 23, 1935; New York City, U.S.
- Died: March 10, 2025 (aged 89); San Francisco Bay Area, California, U.S.
- Education: Antioch College
- Occupations: master printmaker, writer, lecturer, entrepreneur
- Known for: Printmaking
- Spouse(s): Jeryl Parker (m. 1960; div. 1963) Tom Marioni (m. 1983)
- Children: 1

Kathan Louise Brown (April 23, 1935 – March 10, 2025) was an American master printmaker, writer, lecturer, and entrepreneur. In 1962, Brown founded Crown Point Press, a fine art print shop specializing in etching, and owned and directed the shop since then. Crown Point Press is widely credited with sparking the revival of etching as a viable art medium. Influential artists such as John Cage, Chuck Close, Anish Kapoor, Ed Ruscha, Kiki Smith, and Pat Steir have worked there.

== Early life and education ==
Brown was born in New York City on April 23, 1935 and grew up in Daytona Beach, Florida. She received a B.A. from Antioch College and an M.F.A. from the California College of Arts and Crafts. In addition, she holds Honorary Doctorate degrees from California College of the Arts (CCA) and the San Francisco Art Institute.

== Career ==
In 1956, Brown left Antioch College in Ohio for one year to attend the Central School of Arts and Crafts in London. There, she began to study etching. After graduating from Antioch College in 1958, Brown returned to the Central School for another year to fine-tune her technique. In addition, she participated in the Print Workshop at 28 Charlotte Street, run by Birgit Skiöld.

In the summer of 1959, while on a holiday trip to Edinburgh, Brown noticed an old etching press in the backyard of her rooming house. The landlady offered the press to Brown, saying it had been there since World War II. With the etching press in tow, Brown booked passage on a freighter going to San Francisco from Glasgow via the Panama Canal.

In 1962, Brown started Crown Point Press in a storefront space in Richmond, California. The following year she bought a house in Berkeley and ran the printmaking workshop out of her basement. In 1965, Brown began publishing the etching portfolios of Richard Diebenkorn and Wayne Thiebaud. The Press moved into a vacant hat factory on San Pablo Avenue in Oakland in 1971 and then to Folsom Street in San Francisco in 1986. Unfortunately, the Folsom Street space was lost in the Loma Prieta earthquake of 1989. In 1990, Crown Point moved to 20 Hawthorne Street in San Francisco where it resides today.

Over time, Brown shifted much of her focus to writing and left the day-to-day operations of the press to director, Valerie Wade, who is a partner in the business. In 2006, Crown Point began publishing a series of books about printmaking, the Magical Secrets series. Brown wrote the first book in the series, Magical Secrets about Thinking Creatively: The Art of Etching and the Truth of Life, which highlights various creative processes artists have embraced while working in the Crown Point studio. Art on Paper magazine reviewed Magical Secrets about Thinking Creatively saying, “Brown combines printmaking, art history, memoir and how-to inspirational literature to address the creative process. She’s wise, forthcoming and down-to-earth”. In 2004, Brown wrote The North Pole, a book detailing her trip to the North Pole through photographs and interviews with travelers, scientists, and a polar archivist. Brown was also the author of a monthly video segment, The Three Minute Egg, where she discusses the creative process.

Over the years, Crown Point's roster has grown to include over 100 artists from all around the world. Crown Point's archives have been held at the Fine Arts Museums of San Francisco since 1991. A smaller archive is owned by the National Gallery of Art, Washington, D.C. Crown Point Press celebrated its twenty-fifth anniversary with an exhibition at the Museum of Modern Art in New York, and its thirty-fifth with a retrospective jointly organized by and shown at the National Gallery of Art, Washington, D.C. and the Fine Arts Museum of San Francisco at the California Palace of the Legion of Honor. Today, Crown Point Press publishes the work of five artists a year, hosts printmaking workshops and publishes a series of books about printmaking. The Press was sixty years old in 2022.

== Personal life ==
Brown married Jeryl Parker in 1960 and had a son, Kevin Powis Parker, in 1961. Parker and Brown amicably separated in 1963 and later divorced.

In 1983, she married conceptual artist Tom Marioni. They make their home in San Francisco. She died at her home in the San Francisco Bay Area on March 10, 2025, at the age of 89.

== Published work ==
=== Books by Brown ===
- Brown, Kathan (1982). John Cage: Etchings 1978-1982. San Francisco: Crown Point Press. ISBN 1891300083.
- Brown, Kathan (1996). Ink, Paper, Metal, Wood: Painters and Sculptors at Crown Point Press. San Francisco: Chronicle Books. ISBN 0811804690.
- Why Draw a Live Model? Crown Point Press, 1997
- Brown, Kathan (1999). Why Draw a Landscape?. San Francisco: Crown Point Press. ISBN 1891300113.
- Brown, Kathan (2001). John Cage Visual Art: To Sober and Quiet the Mind. San Francisco: Crown Point Press. ISBN 9781891300165.
- Brown, Kathan (2004). The North Pole. San Francisco: Crown Point Press. ISBN 1891300180.
- Brown, Kathan (2006). Magical Secrets About Thinking Creatively: The Art of Etching and the Truth of Life. San Francisco: Crown Point Press. ISBN 3791336541.
- Brown, Kathan (2012). Know That You Are Lucky. San Francisco: Crown Point Press. ISBN 978-1891300240.

=== Contribution by Brown ===
- Changing Art: A Chronicle Centered on John Cage, in Tri-Quarterly 54, Spring 1982. Reprinted in A John Cage Reader, Wesleyan University Press, 1983
- The Cambridge Companion to John Cage, (contributor), ed. David Nicholls, Cambridge University Press, 2002
- The Uncertainty Principle, The Guardian (UK), March 8, 2002
- Brooks, Catherine (2007). Magical Secrets about Line Etching & Engraving: The Step-by-Step Art of Incised Lines. San Francisco: Crown Point Press. ISBN 978-1891300202. Edited, and with an appendix on printing by Kathan Brown
- York, Emily (2008). Magical Secrets about Aquatint: Spit Bite, Sugar Lift & Other Etched Tones Step by Step. San Francisco: Crown Point Press. ISBN 978-1891300219. Edited, and with an appendix on printing by Kathan Brown

== Honors and awards ==
- 1965 – Award for Etching, California Society of Etchers
- 1983 – Arts Commission, City of San Francisco, Award of Honor
- 1985 – Honorary Doctorate of Fine Arts, California College of Arts and Crafts
- 1990 – Honorary Doctorate of Fine Arts, San Francisco Art Institute
- 1993 – Outstanding Achievement Award, ArtTable, Inc., Northern California Chapter
- 1997 – Cyril Award for Business Excellence, San Francisco Chamber of Commerce, San Francisco, California
