= Robert Kulicke =

American painter

Robert Moore Kulicke (1924 – December 14, 2007) was an American artist, frame maker, and teacher. Though most influential for modernizing the design of picture frames, he was also a noted painter of small and delicate still lifes, as well as a jewellery maker credited with reviving the ancient goldsmithing technique of granulation.

== Life ==
Kulicke was born in Philadelphia, where his formal studies included advertising design at the Philadelphia College of Art, while independently he studied the art collections of the Philadelphia Museum of Art.

Returning home after serving three years in the Army during World War II, he became interested in picture framing. Prior to opening his own framing business in New York City in 1951, he traveled to Paris on the G.I. Bill, studied painting with Fernand Léger, and apprenticed himself to several framers.

In New York he befriended the Abstract Expressionists Franz Kline and Robert Motherwell, and designed frames based on a simple band of polished aluminum that would be used on hundreds of works by these and other Modernists. The "Kulicke frame", a tasteful welded design, was commissioned by the Museum of Modern Art in 1956 for use in traveling exhibitions; he subsequently also designed a Lucite frame for the museum's photography collection. A floating frame he created in the late 1950s was used by the Modern on some of its most popular masterpieces after the museum's expansion in 1984. For these widely imitated designs, The New York Times referred to Kulicke as "the most innovative and influential picture frame designer in the United States". The scope of his craftsmanship was extensive, and his reproduction frames have been used on Leonardo da Vinci's portrait of Ginevra de' Benci in the National Gallery of Art in Washington, D.C., and the Epiphany by Giotto in the Metropolitan Museum of Art.

Discouraged by Léger's emphasis on large compositions, Kulicke stopped painting until 1957, when he was called on to frame some 300 small still life paintings by Giorgio Morandi. Inspired by Morandi's work, his own paintings were diminutive studies, often of flowers or a single fruit. His works, which he described as "more 17th century than 20th", were exhibited in museums and several New York galleries. His work is represented in the collections of the Victoria & Albert Museum, the Hirshhorn Museum and Sculpture Garden, and the Albright-Knox Art Gallery.

In 1968 he perfected the granulation technique which had been practiced from antiquity to the 11th century, and used sporadically thereafter, which he then taught to others in jewellery making workshops and academies he founded. In 1982 he was elected into the National Academy of Design as an Associate member and became a full Academician in 1994.
