= Print Center New York =

American nonprofit organization

Coordinates: 40°45′0.22″N 74°0′15.35″W

International Print Center New York
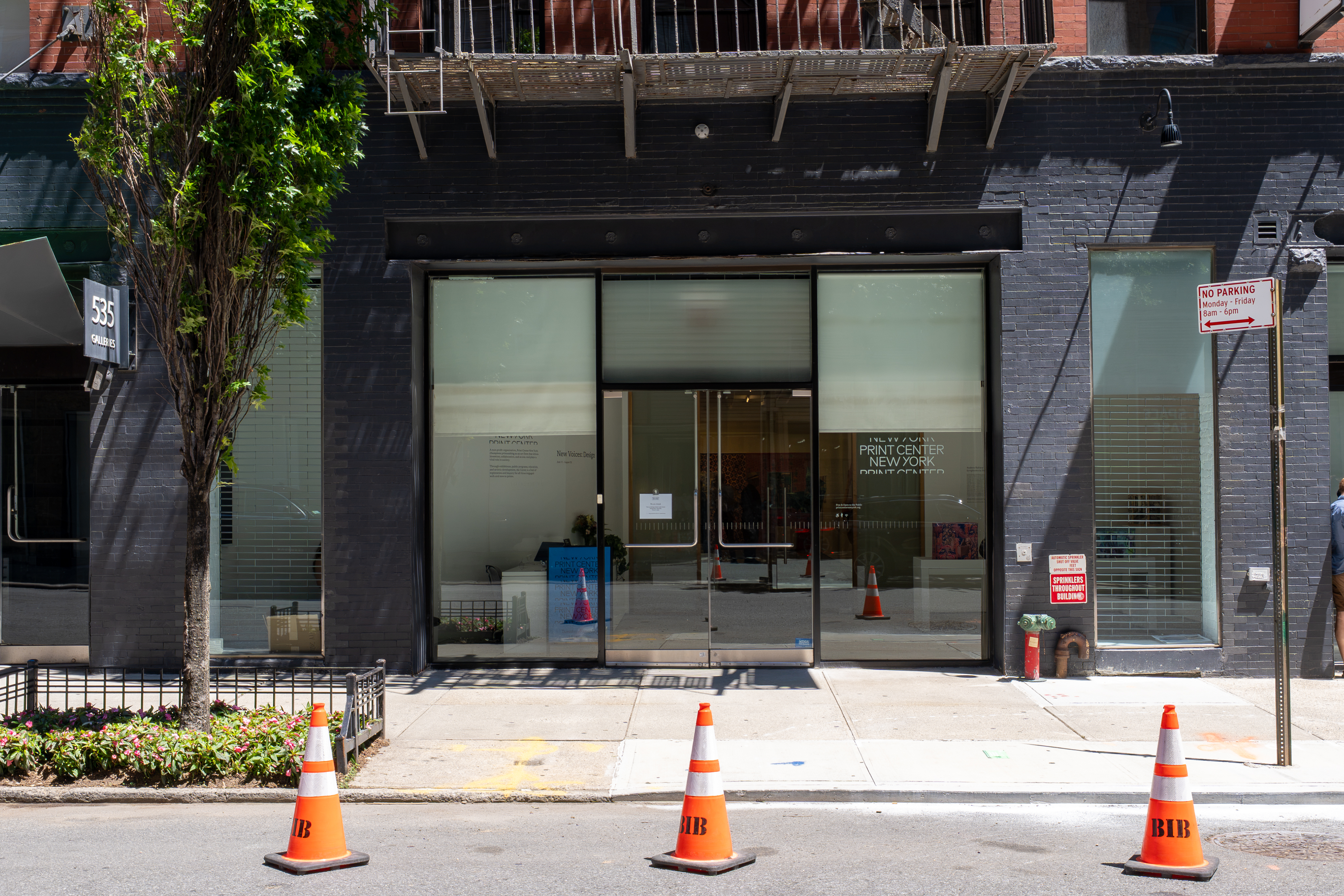
- Established: 1995
- Location: 535 West 24th Street, Manhattan, New York, United States
- Public transit access: Bus: M11, M12, M23; Subway: at 23rd Street
- Website: www.printcenternewyork.org

Print Center New York is an American non-profit organization that works to promote the appreciation and understanding of fine art prints. It was founded by Anne Coffin and established in Chelsea, Manhattan, New York City in September 1995 as the only non-profit institution devoted solely to the exhibition and understanding of fine art prints, through exhibitions, publications, and educational programs.

In addition to its New Prints shows, PCNY organizes two additional exhibitions per season in its gallery in Chelsea, one in the fall and one in the spring. These exhibitions provide context for the New Prints shows, presenting selections of prints from other periods or cultures. The prints are borrowed from public and private collections, and guest curated by experts in the field.

Founded in 1995 as International Print Center New York, PCNY has exhibited work from emerging artists to international masters, including Ed Ruscha, Kiki Smith and Frank Stella.

In October 2022 the International Print Center reopened in Chelsea, renamed as Print Center New York.
