= Garo Antreasian =

American artist

- Born: Garo Zareh Antreasian; February 16, 1922; Indianapolis, Indiana, U.S.
- Died: November 3, 2018 (aged 96); Albuquerque, New Mexico, U.S.
- Education: Herron Art Institute, Art Students League of New York, Atelier 17
- Known for: Printmaking
- Website: antreasian.com

Garo Zareh Antreasian (1922 – 2018) was an American printmaker and educator. He was one of the co-founders of the Tamarind Lithography Workshop in Los Angeles, California.

== Biography ==
Antreasian was born on February 16, 1922, in Indianapolis, Indiana, to an Armenian family. His parents had survived the Armenian genocide of 1915. Antreasian attended Arsenal Technical High School, where he was introduced to lithography. He studied at the Herron Art Institute in Indianapolis. He moved to New York in 1948 where he studied at Atelier 17 and the Art Students League of New York.

In 1960 he was one of the founders of the Tamarind Lithography Workshop in Los Angeles, California. There he served as the first technical director and master printer. The Tamarind moved to Albuquerque, New Mexico, where it became known as the Tamarind Institute. In 1964 Antreasian moved to Albuquerque as well, where he taught art at the University of New Mexico (UNM) and retained his relationship with the Tamarind. He was involved with bringing the Tamarind Institute under the auspices of UNM. Antreasian taught at UNM from 1964 to 1987 and eventually became the chairman of the Department of Art and Art History, and then professor emeritus after his retirement.

In 1972, Antreasian was awarded the Distinguished Alumnus of the Herron Art School and Honorary Doctor of Fine Arts by Indiana University. In 1982, he visited Turkey where he was impacted by Arabic calligraphy and Islamic art, which he conveyed through his own work.

In 1985 Antreasian received a Fulbright Award to travel to Brazil and lecture in Sáo Paulo and Rio de Janeiro.

Antreasian died on November 3, 2018, in Albuquerque, New Mexico.

Antreasian's work is included in the collections of the Art Institute of Chicago, the Metropolitan Museum of Art, the Museum of Modern Art, the National Gallery of Art, the Smithsonian American Art Museum., and The Hyde Collection.

== Bibliography ==
- Antreasian, Garo Z. (2016). Garo Z. Antreasian: Reflections on Life and Art. William Peterson (introduction). UNM Press. ISBN 9780826355423.
- Krause, Martin (1995). Garo Antreasian: Written on Stone: Catalogue Raisonne of Prints 1940-1995 (art exhibition). Indianapolis Museum of Art (author). Indianapolis Museum of Art. ISBN 978-0936260617.
- Antreasian, Garo Z.; Adams, Clinton (1971). The Tamarind Book of Lithography: Art and Techniques (1 ed.). Harry N. Abrams Inc. ISBN 978-0810990173.
