= Thiebaud =

Thiebaud or Thiébaud is a French surname. Notable people with the surname include:

- Georges Thiébaud (1850–1915), French journalist and nationalist
- Jim Thiebaud, American skateboarder
- Wayne Thiebaud (1920–2021), American painter
- Kelly Thiebaud (born 1982), American actress
- Paul Thiebaud (1960–2010), American art dealer
- Sandrine Thiébaud-Kangni (born 1976), French-Togolese sprinter
- Twinka Thiebaud (born 1945), American model
- Valère Thiébaud (born 1999), Swiss cyclist

== See also ==
- Thiébault
- Thiébaut
