= Imogen and Twinka at Yosemite =

1974 photograph by Judy Dater

- Artist: Judy Dater
- Year: 1974
- Type: photograph
- Medium: Gelatin silver print
- Subject: portrait, nude

Imogen and Twinka at Yosemite is a 1974 photograph by Judy Dater. It depicts elderly photographer Imogen Cunningham, encountering nude model Twinka Thiebaud behind a tree in Yosemite National Park. It is considered Dater's most popular photograph and, according to the photographer, was inspired by Thomas Hart Benton's painting Persephone, which portrays a voyeur observing a nude woman, who had been bathing in a stream, reclining against a tree.

== Background ==
Dater had been familiar with Benton's 1938–39 Persephone painting and its theme of voyeurism since her childhood, and it inspired her to attempt several earlier photos based on that theme. She has said that it "really worked" with this particular photo, because "it's a twist, given that it's two women looking at each other."

At the time the photograph was taken, Cunningham was 90 years old and had been a famous photographer for 60 years. Dater had been a friend and admirer for the previous ten years, and considered Cunningham her mentor. The nude model, Twinka Thiebaud, was the daughter of painter Wayne Thiebaud. Dater had earlier photographed Twinka fully clothed, in 1970.

The photograph was taken as part of a workshop called "The Nude in the Landscape", organized by Ansel Adams, that had about 100 students. Dater was one of the instructors, and Cunningham was a guest lecturer. According to Twinka Thiebaud, the event started out in an undisciplined way. The clueless students swarmed around the nude models, and they "pounced like paparazzi", and were "unruly and disorganized". Dater, Cunningham and Thiebaud stepped away from the crowd, and approached the tree. There, as many of the students gathered around her, Dater demonstrated how to work with a model. This photograph was the result.

== Critical reaction ==
The photo was immediately the subject of feminist critical analysis. In 1974, critic Lucy Dougan wrote that the photo "parodies depictions of male voyeurism in the history of Western art, as it playfully amends all those mythical violations of sacred places. It juxtaposes the city against the pastorale: Cunningham's technological baggage of city life/city seeing hangs around her neck in the form of a large camera, but here it is obsolete and new ways of seeing and old narratives come together." She went on to compare the photo to a poem by Kathleen Raine that talks about an old woman's memory of her young breasts, but concludes that the photo has a "much lighter tone of heart" than the poem.

In 1997, critic Sarah Boxer described the photo as "Imogen Cunningham sneaking around the trunk of a giant tree in Yosemite National Park and coming upon Twinka, a nude model who has one leg propped on a root and is looking around coyly" and called it "an amusing play" on the goddess Diana. In 1999, critic Margarett Loke said that the photo "remains a delightful send-up of a photographer with a nude subject". In 2011, critic Donna Stein wrote that "Dater reverses the traditional erotic relationship of a leering old man eyeing a voluptuous nude to show two women — youth and old age — confronting each other." Stein reports that the photo "pays homage to the Persephone myth as portrayed in a painting by Thomas Hart Benton".

== Legacy ==
The photograph was widely seen when reproduced in a profile of Cunningham in a 1976 Life magazine special on "Remarkable American Women".

John Hildebidle, poet and literature professor at the Massachusetts Institute of Technology, has written a poem inspired by the photograph. Prints of the photo are in the collections of the Los Angeles County Museum of Art and Smith College Museum of Art. The photo was part of an exhibition on the art of Yosemite which appeared at the Autry National Center, the Oakland Museum of California, the Nevada Museum of Art and the Eiteljorg Museum of American Indians and Western Art from 2006 to 2008.
