= Paul Thiebaud Gallery =

- Established: 2001
- Location: San Francisco
- Coordinates: 37.8036°N 122.414°W
- Type: Art gallery
- Founder: Paul Thiebaud
- Website: paulthiebaudgallery.com

The Paul Thiebaud Gallery is an American art gallery located in the North Beach neighborhood of San Francisco, California. Founded in 2001 by art dealer Paul Thiebaud, the gallery specializes in modern and contemporary painting, drawing, printmaking, and sculpture, with an emphasis on artists associated with California.

== History ==
Paul Thiebaud entered the gallery business in 1990 when he became a partner of longtime San Francisco art dealer Charles Campbell. Following the partnership, Campbell’s business was renamed the Campbell-Thiebaud Gallery. In 2001, Thiebaud established the Paul Thiebaud Gallery under his own name.

During its founder’s lifetime, the gallery operated locations in San Francisco and New York City. In addition to exhibiting the work of his father, painter Wayne Thiebaud, Thiebaud presented work by established and lesser-known artists.

Paul Thiebaud died from colorectal cancer in 2010 at the age of 49. The gallery continued operating following his death. Its San Francisco location occupies a two-story building on Chestnut Street in North Beach.

== Artists ==
The gallery has represented or exhibited work by numerous modern and contemporary artists and artists’ estates. Its roster and exhibition history have included Wayne Thiebaud, Manuel Neri, Paul Wonner, William T. Wiley, Peter Voulkos, Carlos Villa, David Fertig, and Giorgio Morandi.

In 2006, the gallery’s New York location presented an exhibition of paintings and drawings by Morandi. Reviewing the exhibition for the Observer, critic Mario Naves described its limited scale—six paintings and two drawings—as particularly suited to Morandi’s restrained work.

The gallery has organized multiple exhibitions devoted to Wayne Thiebaud. A 2010 San Francisco presentation brought together his charcoal still lifes and figure drawings. In 2018, the gallery presented Wayne Thiebaud: Monotypes, which assembled prints from the two periods in which the artist worked extensively in that medium, 1977 and 1991. The San Francisco Chronicle reported that it was the first exhibition to bring together all of Thiebaud’s single-impression prints.

The gallery’s broader program has included exhibitions of artists connected to the San Francisco Bay Area and the University of California, Davis. In 2024, the gallery presented Contemporary Asian American Abstraction, a group exhibition reviewed by artist and critic Mark Van Proyen in Squarecylinder. In January 2026, it participated in SF Art Week with three concurrent exhibitions, including a presentation of work by UC Davis faculty members and alumni.
