= New Painting of Common Objects =

Poster for the exhibition.

New Painting of Common Objects was a 1962 exhibition held at the Pasadena Art Museum in Pasadena, California. Organized by curator Walter Hopps, the exhibition is one of the first museum surveys of American Pop art in the United States. The eight artists included were: Roy Lichtenstein, Jim Dine, Andy Warhol, Phillip Hefferton, Robert Dowd, Edward Ruscha, Joe Goode, and Wayne Thiebaud. The show introduced Pop art to a broader museum audience and contributed to the movement's early critical recognition.

== Background ==
New Painting of Common Objects opened at the Pasadena Art Museum on September 25, 1962. The exhibition brought together paintings derived from consumer products, commercial labels, and advertising imagery, marking a shift away from Abstract expressionism toward imagery drawn from everyday mass culture. It was presented concurrently with the exhibition U.S. Abstract Expressionism.

The show was curated by Walter Hopps, who was the co-founder and former director of the Ferus Gallery in Los Angeles, which introduced Pop art to the West Coast. Although often described as the first museum survey of Pop art, the exhibition American Painting and Sculpture from Connecticut Collections at the Wadsworth Atheneum preceded New Painting of Common Objects by a month. Mounted in July 1962, it included works by emerging Pop artists such as Andy Warhol and Claes Oldenburg, reflecting the growing visibility of Pop-related imagery in museum exhibitions at the time.

== Participating artists ==
The exhibition included the following artists:

- Jim Dine
- Robert Dowd
- Joe Goode
- Phillip Hefferton
- Roy Lichtenstein
- Ed Ruscha
- Wayne Thiebaud
- Andy Warhol

== Critical reception ==
The Los Angeles Times noted that the exhibition contrasted sharply with the prevailing dominance of Abstract expressionism, observing that artists such as Roy Lichtenstein, Andy Warhol, Edward Ruscha, and Joe Goode used "paintings of words and images of various and commercial labels," replacing the "varied personal non-objective imagery associated with Abstract Expressionism." However, Los Angeles Times art critic Henry J. Seldis was more dismissive, calling the exhibition "the latest trend in contemporary painting" and suggesting the "recent avant garde expressions" might be a short-lived "bandwagon" promoted by the Ferus Gallery.

In the Independent Star-News, art critic Heloise Welch described New Painting of Common Objects as a delightful contrast to Abstract expressionism. She wrote the "contrasting 'Commonists' … deal with an unusual and unexpected form of protest. This sort of protest has been expressed in literature, but it is daring and humorous to see it in paint. It is daring because some of the myths of our civilization are being ridiculed. Money, a symbol of success, is reproduced in monstrous sizes; the 'things' so highly prized by an overindulged people are dulled rather than chromium-plated; and other surprising judgments await the sympathetic viewer."

Artforum critic John Coplans argued that the exhibition reflected the visual environment of a society shaped by industrial production and consumer goods. He suggested that the artists drew their imagery from the everyday landscape of modern commerce, emphasizing the "impact of modern industrial production and consumption." Coplans also warned against overstating the philosophical novelty of the movement, writing that "neither philosophical newness nor modernism of metaphysics" necessarily produced significant art.

== Legacy ==
The exhibition helped legitimize the emerging movement within institutional contexts. It has since been widely regarded as a turning point in the acceptance of Pop art by museums.

The show preceded later museum exhibitions devoted to the movement, including Six Painters and the Object at the Solomon R. Guggenheim Museum in New York in 1963.
