= Shane Guffogg =

American artist

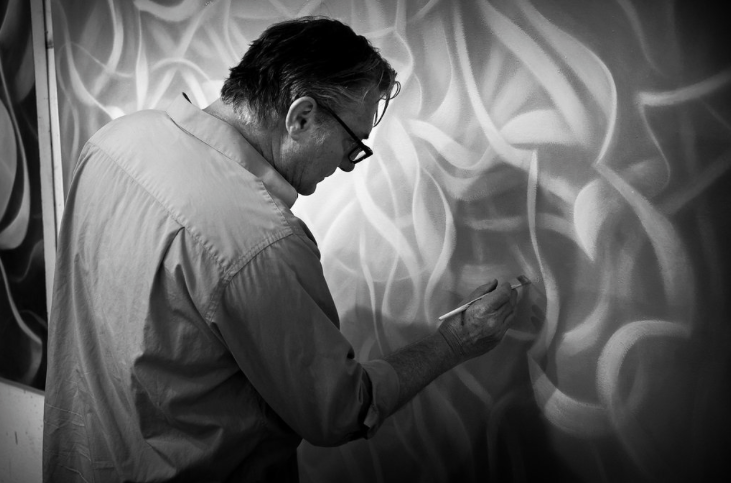
- Born: Shane Anthony Guffogg; August 12, 1962 (age 64); Los Angeles, California, United States
- Education: California Institute of the Arts
- Known for: Painting, Drawing, Sculpture
- Movement: Abstract
- Spouse: Martha Gehman (m.1995-2010)

Shane Guffogg (Guf-fogg; born August 12, 1962) is an American artist associated with the abstract art movement. He has worked in the media of painting, drawing, and sculpture. Guffogg lives and works between Los Angeles and Strathmore, California.

== Early life and education ==
Guffogg was born in Los Angeles on the 12th of August 1962. At the age of four, he and his family moved to Lindsay, a small farming town in the San Joaquin Valley. In 1975, his family moved to Strathmore, the neighboring town, because they bought an exotic bird farm. He worked on the farm during his teen years. In the late 1970s Guffogg realized his passion for art and convinced his parents to let him build a studio on the farm. After graduating high school in 1980, Guffogg traveled around Europe visiting various art museums for two months. That fall, he began studying art in a local community college in the Tulare County area. In fall of 1983, he entered the fine arts program at California Institute of the Arts, also known as “Cal Arts.” Attending Cal Arts was a recommendation by artist, Joe Goode after Guffogg visited his studio earlier that year. Douglas Huebler became Guffogg's mentor at Cal Arts because of his influence in the conceptual art movement. He received his B.F.A. from Cal Arts in 1985. He was an assistant to Ed Ruscha and Joe Goode from 1989 until 1995.

== Work ==
Guffogg's works consist of mediums such as oils on canvas or paper, watercolors, gouache, pastels on paper, and traditional etchings on zinc plates. The size of Guffogg's pieces can range anywhere between 10” x 8” to 10’ x 8’. The paintings with oils typically have as many as 60 to 70 layers of translucent colors. These colors are mixed with a glazing medium that gives these works an illuminated look. This particular process of layering is customary of the Masters and shows how Guffogg's work is rooted in ways of historical European painting techniques.

After visiting the work of the Master's in person during his European travels, Guffogg came to the realization that art is a language in itself as it can explain certain things words cannot. As a result, his works can be thought to be its own language of signs and symbols through its patterns, visual depth and light; which can, in turn, emit emotion to the viewer and hints to Quantum Physics and Super String Theory.

=== Early Influences ===
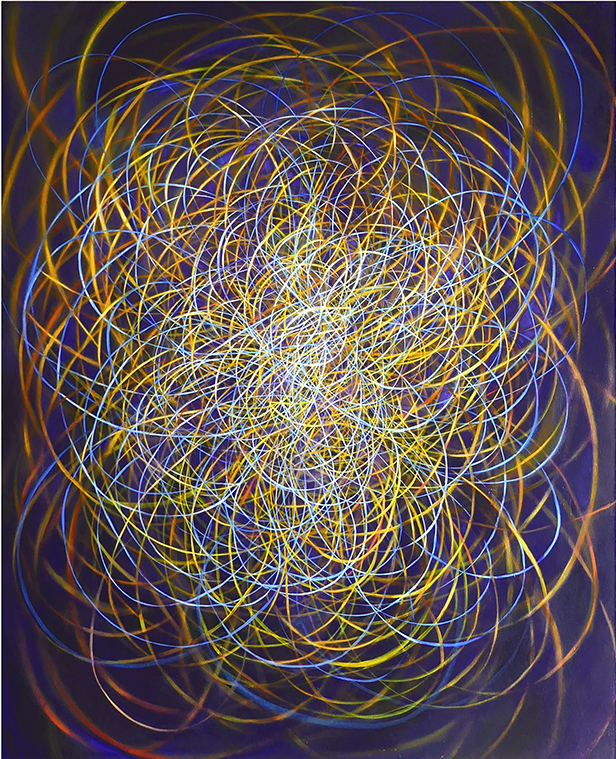
At the Still Point of the Turning World: The Statesman and the Rulers, 2017 by Shane Guffogg, Oil on Canvas, 60" x 48"

Guffogg's attraction to art began at an early age. In the late 1960s his mother would take him to the library to check out books. Many of these books were art books with pictures of the art created by the masters, Da Vinci, Rembrandt, and Van Gogh. He saw their works as magic and wanted to be a part of that. From then on he was always drawing or painting. Guffogg said, “I would look at a tube [of paint] and smell it and dab a little bit on my fingers and wonder how artists could take this substance and make it into a work of art. I thought it was like alchemy, like magic. So I always wanted to be a magician in that regard.”

His fascination with the masters and art only continued as he flew to Europe the day after he graduated high school to finally see the works he had admired in person. He visited the National Gallery in London and was inspired to create a self-portrait of himself in Rembrandt's style after seeing Rembrandt's portrait. However, it was not until he saw “The Last Supper” in Milan where he knew he would be an artist.

After that summer, Guffogg enrolled in Porterville College where he put all his focus on painting and studied art history. He felt that it was important to study art history because he felt that it was essential to understanding the art world if one wanted to be a part of it. He looked at it as if it were a conversation that had gone on for years and in order to be fully immersed in it, he must understand how the dialogue began. At the same time, he was curious about Einstein's theory of relativity and space. After studying at CalArts he returned to Strathmore to live with his family and began painting fruit at the family's farm. This homecoming changed his thoughts of how he could contribute to the dialogue of the masters. Guffogg explained, “I began wondering what thoughts look like before we attach language to them. I was also wanting to make paintings that hover between abstraction and realism – between what we see and what we sense.”

=== New York City ===
In 1985, he was chosen by Huebler and other faculty members at CalArts to attend an internship in New York where he could work at a gallery, museum, or as an artist assistant. Guffogg chose to work alongside New York artist, Gary Stephan. The internship lasted around six months, Guffogg chose to focus on learning and watching Stephan work and chose to make no artwork during this time.

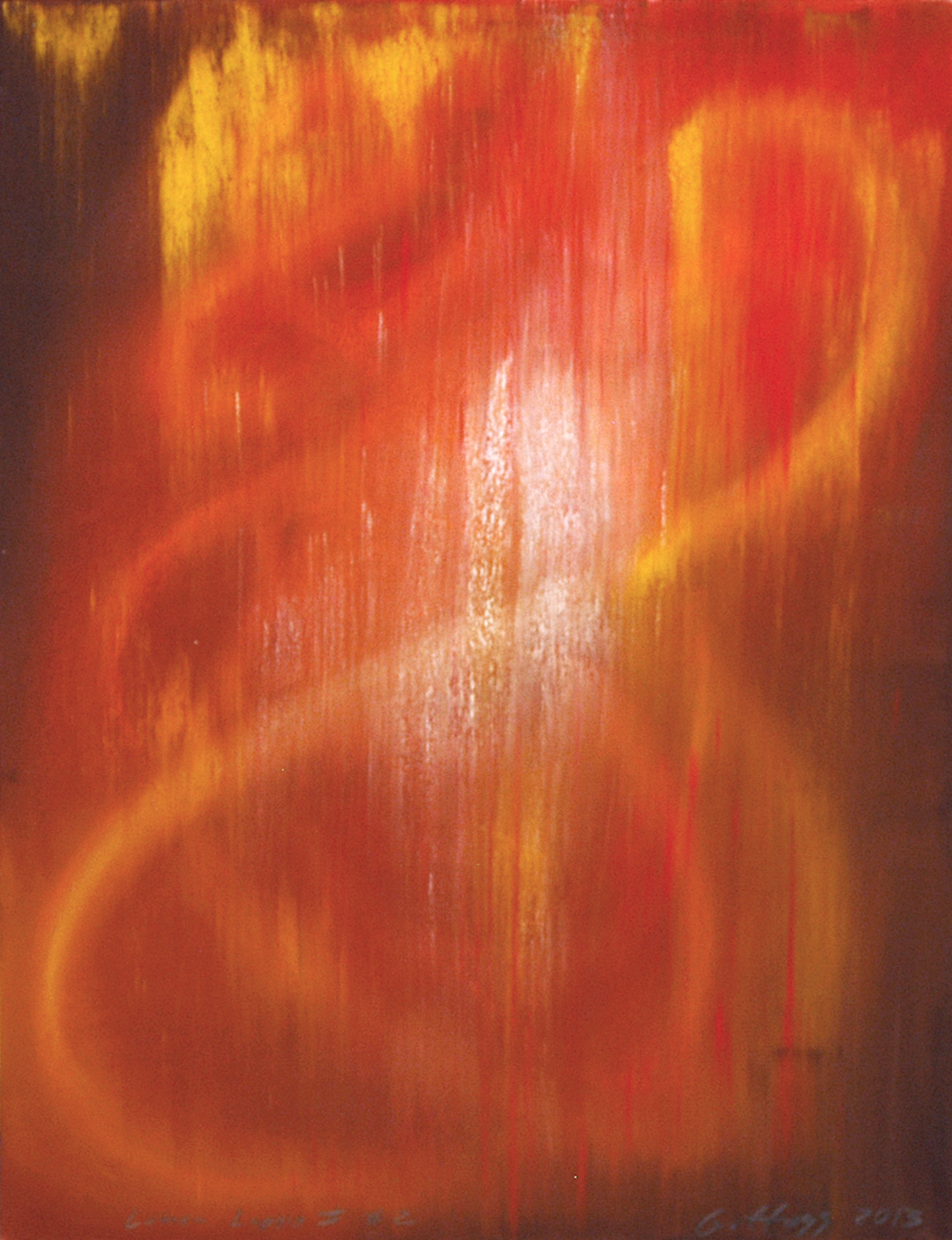
Lumen Lapsis II #2, 2013 by Shane Guffogg, Pastel on Paper, 16" x 12"

=== Pharmaka ===
In 2003, Guffogg began meeting weekly with fellow artists John Scane and Vonn Sumner, and art dealer, Adam Gross, discussing art and the LA art scene. Guffogg created a manifesto for the group that explained the ideas discussed within the group. The manifesto became a constitution which would be called Pharmaka. The name Pharmaka was utilized after their dialogue became public when they opened it up through three exhibitions in Downtown Los Angeles, Hollywood, and Los Feliz.

The Pharmaka non-profit gallery space opened in Downtown Los Angeles in 2004 and stayed until 2009. This space was used for different exhibitions and to continue to open up the dialogue of the current state of contemporary art for artists and curators.

Guffogg's involvement in Pharmaka allowed him to become a pillar in the arts community. During this period, Guffogg lectured at the Savannah College of Art and Design (SCAD), Pharmaka, and the Orange County's Art Crowd. Additionally, he curated numerous exhibitions and had a strong voice in the Los Angeles art community. As a result, he was given a position on the board of the downtown neighborhood council to represent art, culture, and education. He also became a chair for the Downtown Arts Committee.

=== Pattern Paintings ===
Guffogg began creating his pattern paintings in the 90's. These works are created through 70 to 80 layers of translucent oil paint on canvas in order for the pieces to display illumination from within. What is different about the pattern paintings is that Guffogg paints a pattern over his usual pattern found in other works. The patterns are painted lightly and look as if a painted lace was draped over Guffogg's work. He creates the patterns seen in these works by starting at the left-hand corner and working his way across the canvas. This method of applying the pattern to the painting shows Guffogg's attention to conscious and subconscious perceptions and his fascination with the way the human psyche operates. As a result, the viewer can see dancing light within the work veiled by a lace-like pattern.

=== At the Still Point of the Turning World ===
Guffogg began his At the Still Point series in 2009. The series was inspired and its name was taken from T.S. Eliot's poem, ‘Burnt Norton (No. 1 of Four Quartets).’ He first read the poem, years previous to the series’ creation, however, he returned to it because Guffogg feels that the poem addresses his concerns about the art world and the world of painting in the 21st century. Guffogg stated, “for me this is a continuous conversation between past and present, and about creating movement out of stillness in order to make the abstract real.” Although most works in the abstract movement are about flattening of pictorial space and denying the Renaissance window, in this series Guffogg's goal was to create it.

The movement of light through the ribbons in the series documents his own physicality through brushstrokes seen within the paintings. The ribbons create a web through each movement of the brush as each movement requires a counter movement so balance occurs within the piece. As a result, it makes the viewer think the web consists of a single line.

He was also inspired by William Turner's seascapes that were made from 1835 to 1846, Mark Rothko's last works on paper, pieces by Rembrandt, and Jasper John's early ‘Alphabet’ paintings. Guffogg sees this series as a conversation with the artists that inspired him.

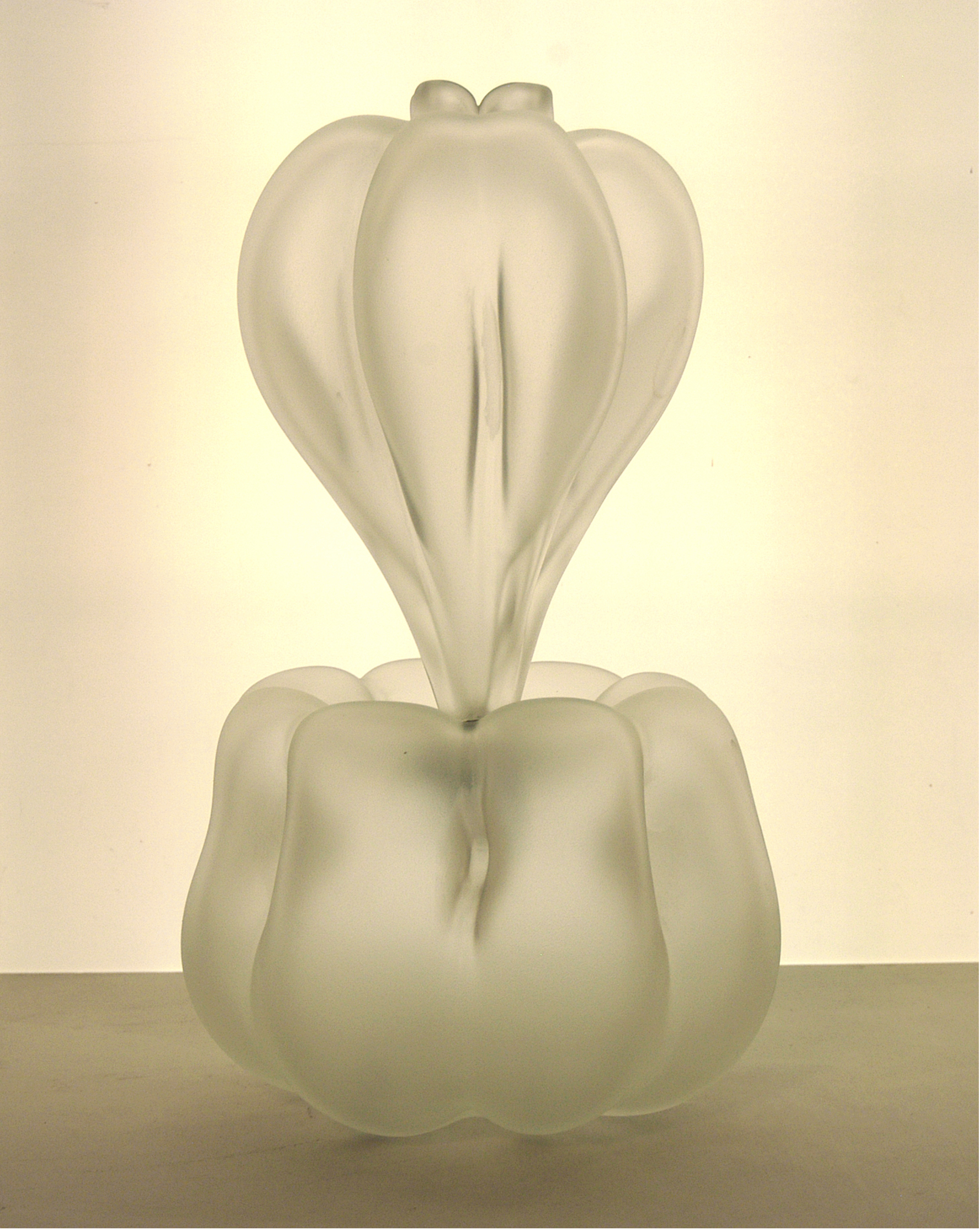
The Fifth Sound 1 of 7, 2014 by Shane Guffogg, Clear Crystal Murano Glass, Hand Blown and Sanded, 18" x 11" x 11"

=== Ginevra de Benci ===
Guffogg's Ginevra de Benci series of paintings are inspired by Leonardo da Vinci's "Ginevra de Benci” painting. The series was created following Guffogg's “At the Still Point Series” and is thought of as an evolution of that series. The portrait by Leonardo da Vinci is on display at the National Gallery of Art in Washington D.C. The series by Guffogg consists of fifty-two oil on canvas pieces that are meant to symbolize a conversation between Guffogg and Da Vinci. Each painting in the series is titled Ginevra de Benci then numbered. The series appeared in Guffogg's 2013 exhibition, titled, “The Annunciation of Ginevra de’Benci: Conversations with Leonardo.”

The series displays Guffogg's illuminated ribbon motif created in combination with oil paint and resin. The combination of these two materials gives these paintings bursts of light. The tangled ribbons give hints at Leonardo's portrait of de Benci and feminine shape. One can see how Guffogg utilizes abstraction and string theory, modern mathematical and scientific tools, and how Da Vinci utilized classicism and science and math of his time within his work.

=== Lumen Lapsis ===
"Lumen Lapsis" series consists of pastels on paper. In Latin, “lumen lapsis” means, “light falling”. This name is meant to capture the use of light, which is always present in Guffogg's artwork. Additionally, these works utilize light to display the cascading colors of the medium. Lumen Lapsis is also meant to display “thought and process”, working simultaneously, as Guffogg is able to manifest these pieces over one sitting, completing a dialogue with each work.

While creating, Guffogg believes he is able to truly connect with each pastel, unlike oils, that need to be worked over a number of sessions, and take time to dry, pastels allow him to create dimensional layers, as there is no drying time and it allows him to create a “pure moment.”

=== Murano Glass ===
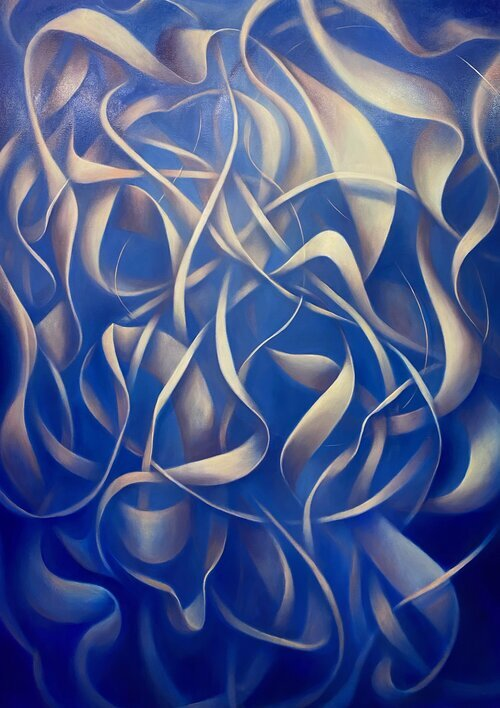
Shane Guffogg, “Sapere Aude 12”, oil on canvas, 84 x 60 in. 2019

“The Fifth Sound” is the name of Guffogg's Murano glass pieces. The inspiration that would later create this series came to Guffogg in 1997. He began drawing the negative space between the ribbons found in his oil paintings. Then Guffogg would fold the paper with the drawing of negative space in half then cut out the shape would appear as a mirrored image. These shapes created from negative space in his paintings spurred the idea of creating sculptures and would later become templates for the Murano glass series, “The Fifth Sound.”

In 2004, Guffogg was approached by a Venetian art dealer that was looking to have a California artist collaborate with a Murano glass master. He then pursued this opportunity and went to Venice. There, he learned the history of Murano glassmaking. He collaborated with the glass master to display this negative space found with in his oil paintings in a three- dimensional sculpture form. Guffogg and the glass master proceeded with this, and “The Fifth Sound” Murano glass series came to fruition. Guffogg sees these pieces as extensions of his two-dimensional work. These pieces are hand blown and then sanded down so they appear more opaque. Some pieces in the series are also mirror coated as well.

=== Sapere Aude ===
Sapere Aude is a series that Guffogg began in 2016. Like many of his series, this one is also based on the movement of light. Guffogg uses his signature ribbon motif through oils on canvas in flesh tones. The series’ name Sapere Aude means “Dare to Know” in Latin. The flesh tones are used to depict the human form and its constant evolution through life and society. Through these works he strives to make his viewer question the themselves, people, surroundings and unknown to find virtue.

=== A Rose is a Rose is a Rose ===
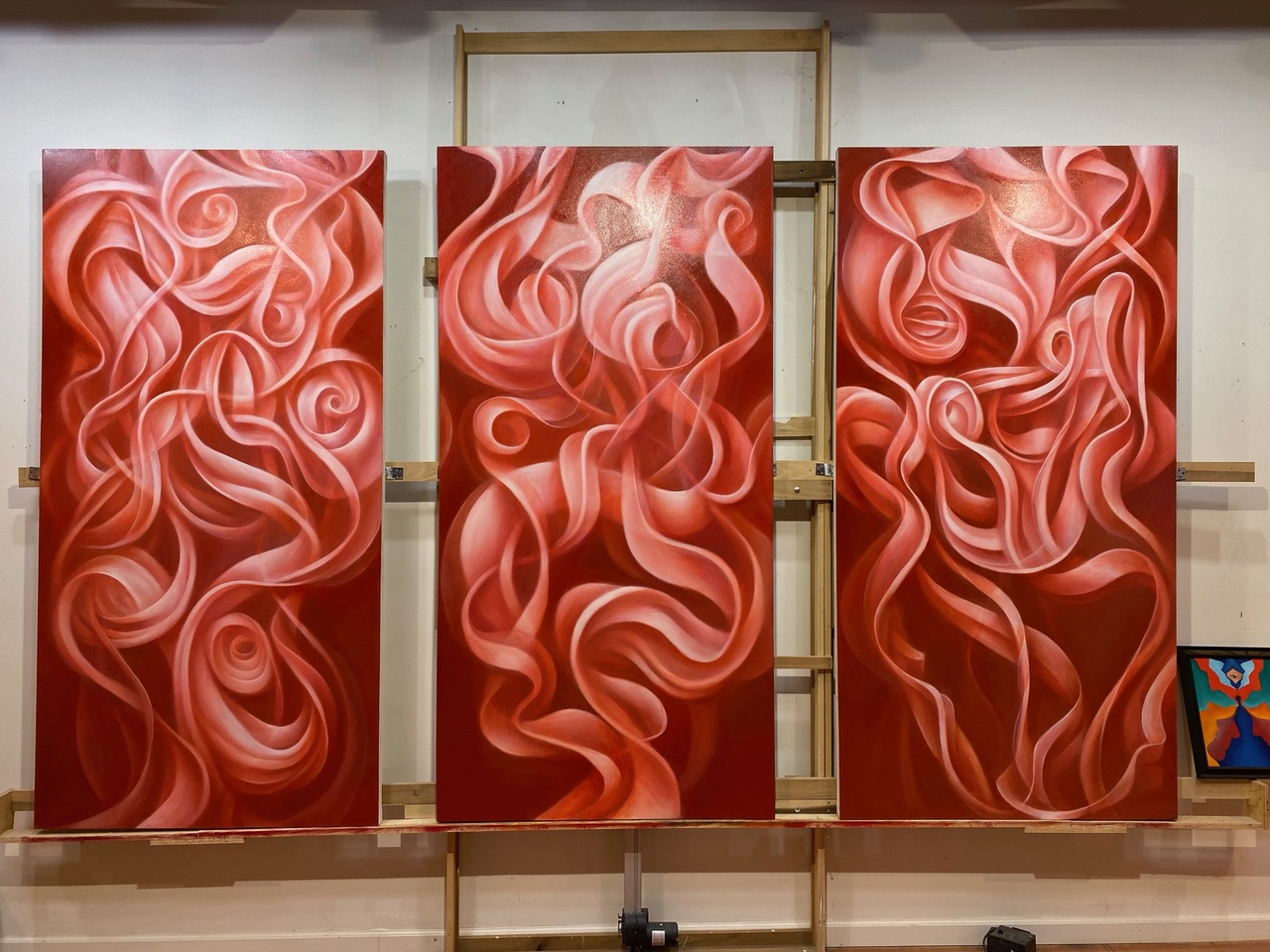
Shane Guffogg, 2020, “A Rose is a Rose is a Rose #13”, oil on canvas, 84 x 126 (triptych)

In 2019, Shane Guffogg began the series, A Rose is a Rose is a Rose. This series was inspired by Gertrude Stein and his ranch in Central California. The name of this series comes from a line in Gertrude Stein's 1913 poem, “Sacred Emily.” He was also inspired by a lecture she spoke at Oxford University where she shared that the word “rose” has three meanings: a person's name, a flower, and a concept. He also found inspiration from his blooming orchard at his ranch is Central California. There he has planted over 100 different fruit trees and of course roses as well. While up at his ranch, he starts each day tending to this orchard and then begins to paint. The evolution of these plants, blossoming and bearing delicious fruits sparked inspiration for this series.

These pieces depict a delicacy of a rose in a silent, abstract form. He utilizes oils on canvas to depict these dreamy shapes and swirl of a rose in an abstract way. They enamor the viewer as Guffogg demonstrates the evolution of a blossoming rose in these works.

== Collections ==
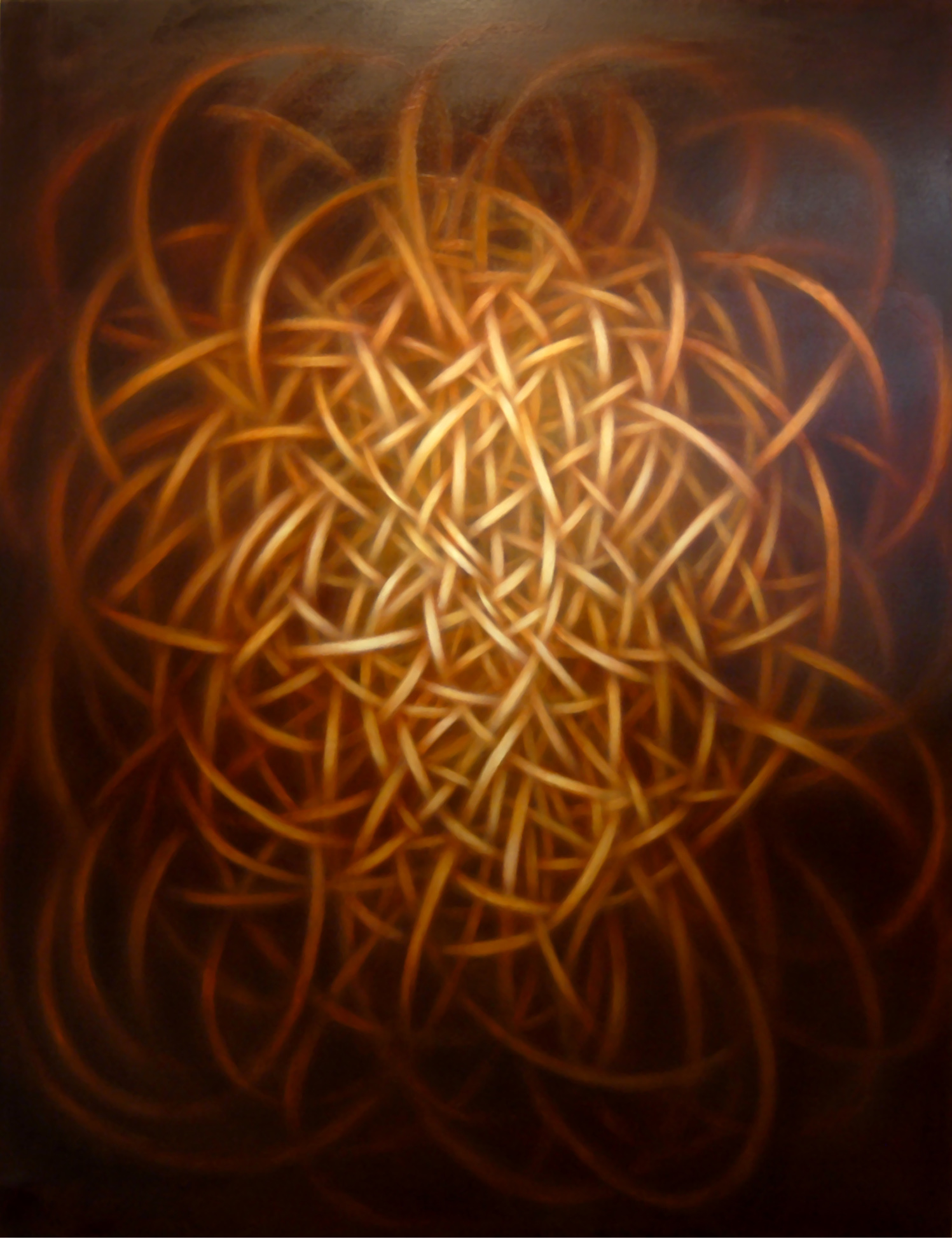
Ginevra de Benci #10, 2011, by Shane Guffogg, Oil on Canvas, 80" x 60"

- Hammer Museum, Los Angeles, CA
- Nasher Museum of Art at Duke University, Durham, NC
- Fresno Art Museum, Fresno, CA
- Fundación Jumex, Mexico City
- Laguna Art Museum, Laguna Beach, CA
- Long Beach Museum of Art, Long Beach, CA
- St. Patrick's Cathedral, New York, NY
- Van Pelt-Dietrich Library, University of Pennsylvania, Philadelphia, PA
- Frederick R. Weisman Art Foundation, Los Angeles, CA

== Art Market ==
Guffogg's Amor Fati #1, 2013 sold under the "best sales" category at the Beach Cannes Auction in August 2016 for €148,100. In June 2017, Guffogg's As of Today #3, 2011 oil on canvas (60” x 80”) was sold for a record high price of $285,000 at Paris auction house, Cornette de Saint CYR.

Ginevra de Benci #24, completed in 2012, oil on canvas 80 x 100 inches, sold for

€257,000 ($311,516), at an auction in October 2017 at Cornette de Saint CYR, Paris, France “Art Contemporain” auction in Paris.

At the Still Point of the Turning World - Inhabit the Garden, completed in 2019 is an oil on canvas, 78 x 96 inches, SOLD at Cannes Encheres auction (France) for US$224,000.00 on July 19, 2019

On August 2, 2020, Guffogg's Hommage à Klien (At the Still Point of the Turning World - Behind Us Reflected in the Pool) 2017, oil on canvas, 60 x 48 inches, SOLD at Vermot & Associes Auction in France for US$136,000.00 (115,000.00 EURO).

== Publications ==
- Thoughts and Conversations with Shane Guffogg 2017-2019 by Victoria Chapman
