= Persephone (painting) =

1938–39 painting by Thomas Hart Benton

- Artist: Thomas Hart Benton
- Year: 1938–1939
- Medium: Tempera with oil glazes on canvas
- Dimensions: 183.2 cm × 124.4 cm (72.1 in × 49.0 in)
- Location: Nelson-Atkins Museum of Art, Kansas City, Missouri

Persephone is a 1938–1939 painting by the American artist Thomas Hart Benton. It depicts the Greek goddess Persephone resting nude beside a tree in a rural Midwestern landscape while a farmer, standing in for Pluto, peeks out from behind the tree. The belief that Benton modeled the farmer after himself is a common misconception.

It was painted at the Kansas City Art Institute where Benton worked as a teacher. Several of Benton's students also made their own versions of the subject. A reporter from Life visited Benton in his studio during his work on this painting and his other famous nude painting from the same period, Susanna and the Elders.

The model for Persephone was Imogene Bruton. Bruton modeled for students at the school in the 1930s but abandoned modeling after completing Persephone. She married in 1940, and was later unwilling to talk about her time as a model.

== Overview ==
The painting measures 72 1/8 by 56 1/16 inches (183.2 by 142.4 cm) and was executed in tempera with oil glazes on canvas mounted on panel. The Nelson-Atkins Museum of Art in Kansas City bought the painting in 1986. The museum paid $2,500,000, which was a new record for a Benton painting. The painting depicts the Greek goddess Persephone nude at rest beside a tree in a verdant creek-side setting rendered in greens, reds, and blues. The figure of Hades appears as an aging farmer in contemporary work clothes, positioned behind the tree, peering voyeuristically at the sleeping goddess. Two mules hitched to wagon in upper right corner and haystacks and harvesting seen in upper left background.

The painting inspired Imogen and Twinka at Yosemite, a 1974 photograph by Judy Dater.
