= Chocolate Room =

1970 artwork by Edward Ruscha

Chocolate Room is an installation artwork by the American artist Edward Ruscha. It comprises a room lined with chocolate, which has been screen-printed onto sheets of paper.

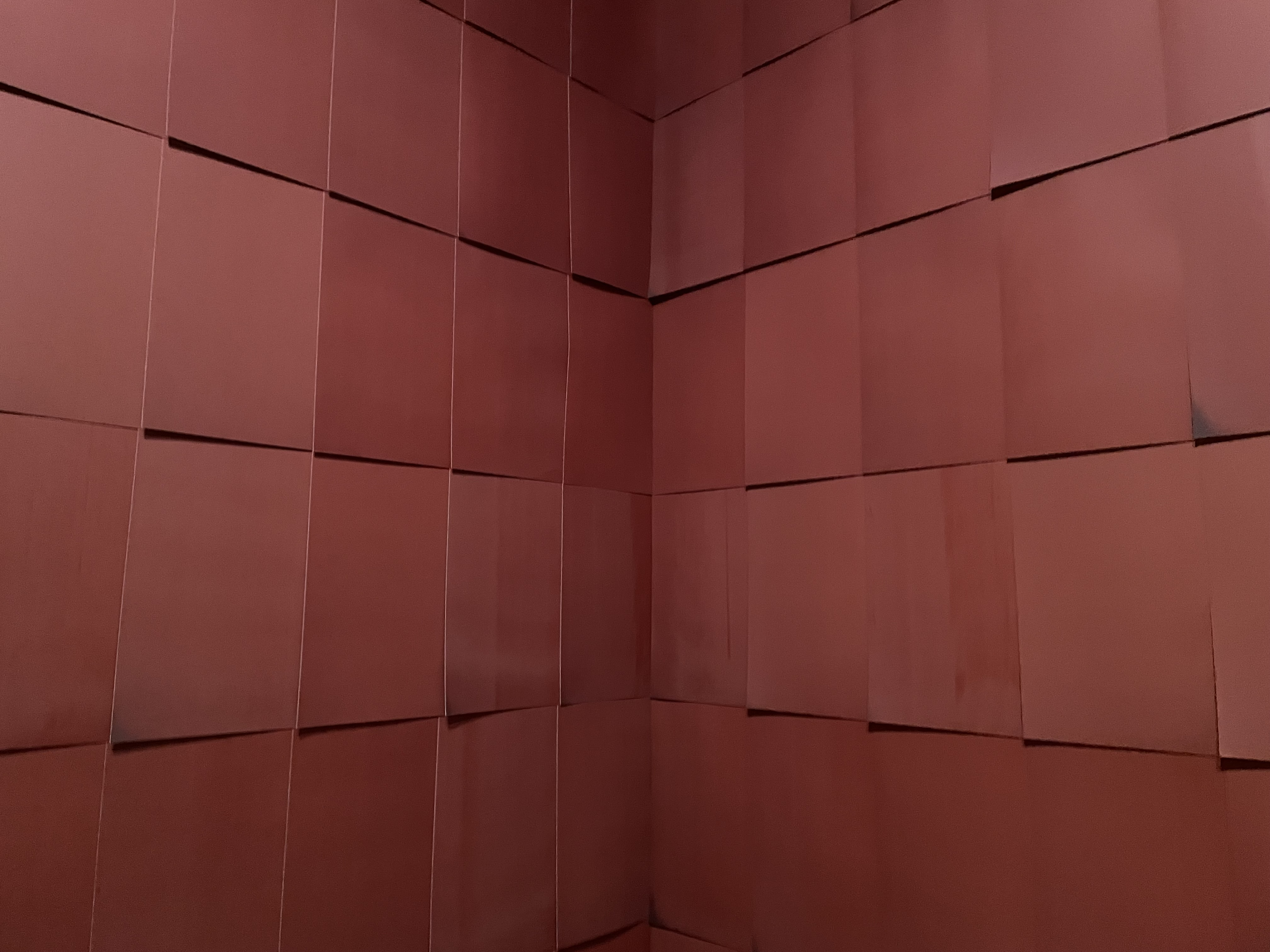
Chocolate Room at Museum of Modern Art on November 10, 2023

Chocolate Room was first exhibited at the 35th Venice Biennial in 1970. Over the course of the exhibition the chocolate slowly melted, and visitors carved anti-war slogans and symbols into the sheets. It was closed after it attracted large amounts of ants. Since 1995 it has been exhibited more than eight times, and was purchased in 2003 by the Museum of Contemporary Art, Los Angeles for an estimated US$1.5 million. The smell of the chocolate is a key element.

== Background ==
Chocolate Room was not the first time Ruscha had used unconventional materials in his art. The year before Chocolate Room was first exhibited, he created "Stains", an unbound, 75-page book with each page featuring a silk screening of various found materials, including candle-wax, chocolate, Coca-Cola and witch-hazel. By placing these objects in the context of a book, their markings took on connotations of the written word. Another was made at the same time as Chocolate Room. The News, Mews, Pews, Brews, Stews & Dues exhibit consisted of six words, printed with substances such as axle grease and pie filling.

Ruscha created Chocolate Room in the context of the concept art and pop art movements in the United States. Artists working within these diverged from traditional art with references to popular culture and by integrating found objects. Stain painting was viewed as promising, "heralded as abstraction’s next big advance".

== History ==
=== Original exhibition ===
In 1970, curator Henry Hopkins commissioned forty-seven artists to create works for the United States Pavilion at the 35th Venice Biennale. Of these, half withdrew protesting the Vietnam War. A room was set aside for printmaking works and Ruscha was selected first to exhibit. According to Ruscha, he had the idea for the work on the plane to Venice as a continuation of his use of unconventional materials. For the exhibit, Ruscha and art dealer Brooke Alexander gathered large amounts of Nestlé chocolate paste, and in the Pavilion silk-screened chocolate onto 360 deluxe, handmade Fabriano sheets of paper (measuring 27.5 by 17.875 inches (69 7/8 cm × 45 3/8 cm)) with printer William Weege. He then attached these sheets, four high, to the walls of a windowless room. The space was lit by sunlight entering through an open door, and low-watt bulbs overhead, creating a soft, warm glow. From outside the space, chocolate could be smelt throughout the pavilion.

As the summer heat gradually melted the exhibit, visitors drew anti-war slogans and peace signs into the sheets. In 2023, Ruscha said that at the time, he had not found this very offensive, but that he'd "prefer that nobody graffiti that thing here (at the exhibition at the Museum of Modern Art)". The 1970 exhibit was ended prematurely, after it attracted an "army of ants".

=== Later history ===
In 1995, curators Ann Goldstein and Anne Rorimer featured Chocolate Room in the "1965-1975: Reconsidering the Object of Art" survey of conceptual at the Museum of Contemporary Art, Los Angeles, the first time it had been exhibited since 1970. The museum acquired the work in December 2003 for an estimated US$1,500,000 (equivalent to $2,625,271 in 2025). As of 2023, Chocolate Room had been exhibited in Los Angeles, Palm Springs, Anchorage, Reno and Oklahoma City. All post-1995 exhibits had been installed by the La Paloma Fine Arts company, operated by the McPherson family. Until the 2023 New York exhibit, La Paloma had always used Hershey's chocolate bars, and in some of these the chocolate had bloomed, forming white discoloration on the sheets.

==== Now Then exhibition ====
In 2023, Chocolate Room was shown for an eighth time, now in New York as part of the "Now Then" exhibition at the Museum of Modern Art. In putting on the exhibition, Ruscha did not prioritize being accurate to previous exhibits. In a description in the New York Times of the screen-printing process, members of the McPherson family maintain a pool of melted chocolate with reserves kept in double boilers. The rubber blade of the squeegee is drawn across the screen's mesh, leaving chocolate on the paper below. The sheets are hung on drying racks, each containing 0.2 pounds (90 g) of chocolate. The double boilers were abandoned when they proved to be too inexact, and the more high-tech ChocoVision Revolation Delta were used instead. The installation at the "Now Then" exhibition was the first to use dark chocolate, chosen for its visual appeal. It also broke from a history of using Hershey bars to use Callebaut chocolate for the first time.

LA Times art critic Christopher Knight criticized the exhibition for exhibiting the work in a room with two doors, allowing the smell of chocolate to escape, and creating an "inert" experience. In contrast, he praised the 2024 exhibit of Now Then at the Los Angeles County Museum of Art (LACMA) for exhibiting the work in a room with one door, as it had been presented originally. In his review of the LACMA exhibition, he described a viewer being drawn in by the scent, and then being pushed out as the smell becomes "disagreeable".

== Analysis ==
Chocolate Room engages with the values ascribed to chocolate, creating a "bittersweet" experience by attracting viewers with the scent of chocolate that they cannot eat once inside. The work engages with chocolate as an object of popular culture.

Chocolate Room is unique among Ruscha's oeuvre as his only installation.

== Sources ==
- Diehl, Travis (September 1, 2023). "Ed Ruscha's 'Chocolate Room' Still Tantalizes". The New York Times. Archived from the original on September 1, 2023.
- Katsikopoulou, Myrto (September 18, 2023). "how did ed ruscha cover an entire room at the MoMA with chocolate?". Designboom.
- Knight, Christopher (April 7, 2024). "Review: Ed Ruscha show wowed in New York. Why it's even better in L.A." Los Angeles Times.
- Statton, Liza (Winter 2006). "Bittersweet Obsession: Ed Ruscha's Chocolate Room". Gastronomica. 6 (1): 7–9. doi:10.1525/gfc.2006.6.1.7. JSTOR 10.1525/gfc.2006.6.1.7.
- Vogel, Carol (December 12, 2003). "Inside Art". The New York Times. Archived from the original on May 27, 2015.
