= Vonn Cummings Sumner =

American painter

- Born: 1976 (age 49–50); Palo Alto, California, U.S.
- Other names: Sumner, Vonn
- Occupation: American painter

Vonn Cummings Sumner (born 1976 in Palo Alto, California) is an American painter. He received his Bachelor of Arts, in 1998 and Master of Fine Arts, Painting in 2000, both from the University of California, Davis, where he studied with, among others, painter and educator Wayne Thiebaud.

Sumner's work has been the subject of two solo Museum exhibitions the first having been at the Riverside Art Museum in Riverside, California in 2008 and then at the Phillips Museum of Art at Franklin and Marshall College in Lancaster, Pennsylvania in 2011.

He is known for his metaphorical figurative paintings, often with a muted color palette. The arts writer John Seed, writing in the Huffington Post in 2013 described Sumner's work this way: [Sumner's]"paintings that form a kind of personal Commedia dell'Arte, whose main actor has a tragic, muted air. Sumner is wise enough to know how to engage you in his theater and also smart enough to stand back and let you react on your own terms. The paintings are generous, funny and just a bit opaque... Echoes of Bay Area painting, flavors gleaned from Morandi, Guston and Magritte and a hint of Buster Keaton come together in his recent works through the filter of a sly, discerning intelligence."

Sumner was involved in a dialogue with artist Shane Guffogg and others in the non-profit space, Pharmaka in Downtown Los Angeles. Pharmaka began as a dialogue among Sumner, Shane Guffogg, John Scane, and art dealer, Adam Gross about the current state of contemporary art.

Sumner is represented by the Merry Karnowsky Gallery in Los Angeles. He is a professor of painting at Fullerton College.
