= Mara Devereux =

American painter (1925–2023)

- Born: June 9, 1925; New York City, U.S.
- Died: June 18, 2023 (aged 98)
- Occupation: Artist
- Spouses: Arthur Johnson (1948–1960); Robert Dowd (1962–1996; his death)

Mara Devereux (June 9, 1925 – June 18, 2023) was an American artist.

== Early life ==
Mara Devereux was born on June 9, 1925, in Brooklyn, New York, to Jewish parents of Russian descent who were both carnival stunt performers. She had one sister, Elaine Brogdon (1934–2009). She came of age during the Depression in a cold-water flat in Brooklyn. She began to study art at the Brooklyn Museum when she was eight years old, primarily as a means to stay warm in the New York winter. The WPA was one of many programs designed to counter the ravages of the depression in the thirties and sponsored classes at the museum. At first Mara was deemed to young to participate, but was nevertheless allowed to attend classes. Her focus quickly went in the direction of painting, though, and she began to develop a vocabulary that lent itself to abstract art. A short year later, at the age of nine, Mara had her first show at the Brooklyn Museum.

== Career ==
As an abstract artist, Mara Devereux came to obtain a place of respect and prominence. She lived around and with many prominent people, having at one time been married to a United States representative to NATO, and following that to pop artist Robert Dowd. A musician as well as an artist, she played the bodhran, a Celtic hand-drum, in an Irish ensemble that opened once for the Grateful Dead in San Francisco. She donned clown makeup and became a street performer in 1970s New York City, in the tradition of her parents. Her works are in countless public and private collections. She has been commissioned by the Lipton Tea Company, Bloomingdale's, Saks Fifth Avenue and the Museum of Modern Art in New York. She has had exhibitions in the Brooklyn Museum, the L.A. County Museum of Art as well as the Museum of Contemporary Art in L.A., the Heckscher Museum, the ASTO Museum in Long Beach. She is listed in Who's Who in American Art and Who's Who American Women, compilations of people of noted accomplishment.

Art historian and Frederick R. Weisman Museum director Michael Zakian, became aware of Devereux when he started to put together a retrospective of her late husband's work. He feels she is an artist who missed he due. "She's been a neglected figure", he says. "She played an important role in art. But she was part of that generation of women who grew up in the thirties and forties who deferred to men. She put her career on the back burner for her husband."

Devereux met pop artist Robert Dowd in the early 1960s. They lived and worked together as fellow artists, and were married in 1962. And although they were each working to develop a unique message, Devereux recalls subjugating her work on many occasions in deference to her husband. "The spaces we rented always became his studio, with very little space left for my work." She admits to playing a willing part in this arrangement. At the time, she knew his work was groundbreaking and she did everything she could to create an environment conducive to creativity, albeit his creativity. Together, she and Dowd left Los Angeles and relocated to New York City in 1971. At first, they lived with Devereux's parents in Flushing. They followed this move into a Broome Street loft and eventually, into the Chelsea Hotel. Their residence at the Chelsea was based on an exchange; Dowd's works were on the walls in the lobby, and that enabled him and Devereux to live rent-free for a time. In 1992, Devereux gained residency at Goast Ranch, New Mexico, Georgia O'Keeffe's former outpost, where she gainfully settled in. She lived quite romantically in a trailer next to a cantina where she would take her meals. Devereux moved back to Los Angeles in 1995 when Dowd learned he had cancer. She stayed with him and nursed him until his death.

She was a prolific abstract painter, her work and exhibitions spanning over 50 years. Her paintings are in many homes and collections in Beverly Hills, California and museums throughout the country. Devereux sometimes exhibited with her husband. In the 1960s, she was well known for her five-sided box paintings (covered with plexi-glass) which were used as Lazy Susans. In 2005, Mara Devereux collaborated with the charismatic Kazakh-American tenor Timur Bekbosunov on his multimedia theatrical fantasy, The Songs of the Mad Muezzin (based on the music of Karol Szymanowski), resulting in a new painting series, The Szymanowski Series, produced by the non-profit organization, Art of Opera.

Devereux in 2012

Devereux also does portrait painting. She lives in Los Angeles and continues to paint and exhibit. Her work can be seen at the ASTO Gallery, Los Angeles.

== Personal life and death ==
Devereux met her first husband over their short wave radio. Arthur J. Johnson was a physicist and engineer and a ham radio operator. Devereux's father also had a shortwave radio and she would have conversations with Johnson late into the night, well before they met. He came over to the family's Flushing home to meet on night in 1947, and shortly after, they were married. A son, Roy, was born in 1948. Arther Johnson became U.S. Technical Representative to NATO and the family began a peripatetic life. Over the next decade, they lived in France, Italy, Greece and England. This lifestyle gave Devereux the chance to expand her awareness. She was painting mainly in watercolor at the time because of the portability of the materials, and there was no shortage of inspiration, as she had access to some of the world's great works and museums. But she was quick to point out that she led the life of an important man's wife. This meant the focus was on Arthur Johnson. She left Arthur Johnson around 1960. She moved to Los Angeles and met Robert Dowd.

She married Robert Dowd in 1962. Devereux was quick to give Dowd credit for inspiring her to greater artistic vision. "Robert was the one who told me, made me realize, I am a free spirit. He wanted me to express that. I had never been told that before him. And he was a genius." Several months after they married, Dowd took his work to a higher level of public awareness in a watershed moment at the Pasadena Art Museum in 1962. New paintings of Common Objects featured Dowd as well as Roy Lichtenstein, Wayne Thiebaud, and Andy Warhol, and is the show that many consider to be the inaugural gala of the American Pop Art movement. The show was a resounding success.

Devereux died on June 18, 2023, at the age of 98.
