= Robert Dowd (artist) =

American painter (1936–1996)

- Born: 1936; Detroit, Michigan
- Died: 1996 (aged 59–60); Los Angeles, California
- Education: Center for Creative Studies, Detroit, Michigan
- Known for: Painting, Sculpture
- Movement: Pop Art

Robert Dowd (Grand Rapids, Michigan, 1936–1996) was an American artist, who also painted under the name Robert O'Dowd.

After his discharge from the U.S. Marines in 1957 he entered the Society of Arts and Crafts/Center for Creative Studies, Detroit, Michigan where he studied painting. In 1958-59 he began drawing common objects, including 'Stop' signs. His work first appeared in an Art in America article on the "Young Artists Group" in Detroit. In 1960 he moved to San Francisco and began work on his first images of postage stamps. In 1961 he moved to Los Angeles and began work on his currency paintings. By 1962 he was getting attention for his ground breaking paintings of common objects. Around the country several other artists were experimenting with this new concept and in 1962 he was invited to show his work at the Pasadena Art Museum.

== Birth of Pop Art ==
In 1962 Dowd's work was included, along with Roy Lichtenstein, Andy Warhol, Jim Dine, Phillip Hefferton, Joe Goode, Edward Ruscha, and Wayne Thiebaud, in the historically important and ground-breaking New Painting of Common Objects, curated by Walter Hopps at the Pasadena Art Museum. This exhibition is historically considered the first "Pop Art" Exhibition in America. These painters started a movement, in a time of social unrest, which shocked America and the Art world and changed Art forever, "Pop Art".

== 1960s ==
The 1960s were a time of social unrest. Hoover's FBI and the government thought anybody who was anti-establishment should be investigated and persecuted despite the right of freedom of expression. Unfortunately for Dowd his fascination with painting currency caught the attention of the Secret Service. Painting currency in those days was considered counterfeiting even if intended as a spoof. Dowd explains what happened in an interview with Lynn Pyne:

"One morning in 1963, two agents from the Secret Service knocked on the door of Dowd's studio. They took him down to the Federal building in downtown LA, where they sternly read to him a litany of counterfeiting laws. Evidently it didn't matter that he was a former U.S. Marine. "They were attempting to intimidate me with all these threats" he says. "It was really a matter of them attempting to tell me that if I continued to paint money, that I would be arrested for counterfeiting, that I was breaking the law". "They did have some work of mine that they had confiscated as contraband. They told me they were going to museums and collectors and confiscate all the paintings out of the collections. "My situation as a young artist, struggling at that point, was that I certainly didn't need any major problems added onto my life at the moment, in terms of survival and trying to do my work".

Certainly this hurt his career so he switched back for a while to painting postage stamps but continued to paint currency in private. In November 1963 he began a red and white colored JFK Inauguration Stamp and had just finished it on November 22, 1963 the day JFK was assassinated. Dowd destroyed the painting as he spent the day listening to the events of November 22, 1963. The pencil on paper drawing of the painting dated 11/22/63 survives. On one occasion he found a year's work of paintings of his, which he had in storage for an up-coming exhibition, destroyed and ripped to shreds, so consequently he canceled the exhibition. Sometimes paintings in storage and in his studio would just disappear. He often wondered if the FBI had them in their own collection. Dowd continued to paint and exhibit in L.A. throughout the 1960s. In addition to his currency and stamp paintings Dowd painted 20+ paintings in his Circus series, he painted from photographs (Hefferton Poloroid, 1962), painted candy apples, oreos and chocolate chip cookies, fingerprints, Ohio cookies, appetite eraser, oranges and many, other common objects. He made candy apples in multiples as art, made miniature oreo and chocolate chip cookies with magnets on the back which led to the refrigerator magnet craze. In 1968 Martin Luther King Jr. was assassinated, as was Robert F. Kennedy. In L.A. several months later, there were Viet Nam protests against the war. In 1969 Charles Manson and the Tate–LaBianca murders took place in L.A. and Dowd's artist friend John Altoon died of a sudden heart attack at age 44. In late 1969 Dowd began a new series of paintings Through the Object Barrier and in 1970 he moved to SoHo, New York.

== 1970s & 1980s ==
In 1970 Dowd worked on his Through the Object Barrier series. In 1971 he was commissioned by Cornell University to execute for campus, Unexpected Universe. In 1972 he had a solo exhibition at the White Museum, Cornell University, New York. Throughout the 1970s and 1980s Dowd continued to paint and exhibit in the New York area. He did commission work in New York City, painting Windows with a View on walls in windowless offices. He painted murals in lobbies for large banks and corporations. In 1982 he did the artwork and lay-out for a short-lived national newspaper, Reward News, which offered rewards for information on missing children and adults. Etan Patz and Adam Walsh were featured stories. He also did commissioned portrait paintings. In 1985 Dowd returned to Los Angeles.

== Personal life ==
In 1962 Dowd married artist and painter Mara Devereux whom he met in artist circles after his move to Los Angeles. After moving Dowd and fellow artist John Altoon opened an art supply store and studio at 6500 Santa Monica Blvd., lA. This became a gathering place for LA artists. In the 1960s Devereux was well known for her 5-sided box paintings which were covered with plexiglass and were used as lazy-susans. Devereux is a well known and established artist in her own right and continues to paint and exhibit in LA. Her work can be seen at Gallery ASTO. She remains active in the LA art community and lives in LA. They had no children together but Devereux has a son from a previous marriage, she has not remarried after Dowd's death. Dowd was also survived by a brother, Michael, of Detroit, Michigan.

== Final years ==
The late 1980s and early 1990s brought about a re-examination of Pop Art and a renewed interest in Dowd's contributions to Pop Art. In 1989 Dowd was included in LA Pop of the Sixties, a nine-person exhibition curated by Ann Ayres at the Newport Harbor Art Museum. In 1991 the Smithsonian included Dowd's paintings in the traveling exhibition "The Realm of the Coin: Money in Contemporary Art" curated by Barbara Coller. Dowd's famous 1965 painting "Van Gogh Dollar" (owned by Joni Gordon of L.A.) was featured. In 1994 the U.S. Treasury Department announced that it was going to re-design U.S. currency and produce "New Money". Dowd's enthusiasm was re-kindled. Now living in Abiquiu, New Mexico he planned to re-visit his work of the 1960s with a new series of paintings, New Money, his vision of what new money could or would like. He started with the $100.00 Bill and with the financial help of a close friend he produced a "Limited Edition" of 200 lithographs of the $100.00 Bill. While planning out his other painting in the series Dowd became ill. Known only to his closest friends and relatives, Dowd was told by his doctors that he had a tumor in one of his kidneys. He needed an operation to remove his kidneys and he would require dialysis afterwards to prolong his life. A kidney transplant was required if he were to get a new lease on life. Dowd like so many artists did not have health insurance. With his valuable paintings sold long ago, time ran out for him to reap the financial rewards of his new series of paintings. Unable to afford the costs of medical care, and perhaps to proud to ask for financial help that would have prolonged or saved his life, Dowd's condition worsened, and he quietly moved back to Los Angeles. He was quietly admitted to a Hospice Home where he died of complications of end-stage renal failure. Dowd never wavered in his love for his country, his devotion to his Art and his loyalty to his friends and relatives. The ex-Marine turned "Pop Artist" lived up to the Marine Motto, "Semper fidelis" which means, "Always Faithful".

'New Money', Lithograph by Robert Dowd. 1994

== Museum exhibitions ==
(Solo and Group)

- Santa Barbara Museum of Art, Santa Barbara, CA
- Pasadena Art Museum, Pasadena, CA
- Los Angeles County Museum of Art, Los Angeles, CA
- Oakland Art Museum, Oakland, CA
- Palm Springs Desert Museum, Palm Springs, CA
- Newport Harbor Art Museum, Newport Harbor, CA
- Fullerton Art Museum, Fullerton, CA
- Long Beach Museum of Art, Long Beach, CA
- Riverside Art Museum, Riverside, CA
- Phoenix Museum of Art, Phoenix, AZ
- Laguna-Gloria Art Museum, Austin, TX
- Museum of Art, Indiana University, Bloomington, IN
- Isaac Delgado Museum of Art, New Orleans, LA
- The Henry Art Gallery, Seattle, WA
- Delaware Art Museum, Delaware
- The Art Gallery, Univ. of New Mexico, Albuquerque, NM
- The Sangre de Christo Gallery, Pueblo, CO
- Neuberger Museum, Purchase, NY
- Hofstra Museum, Hempstead, NY
- Queens Museum, Flushing Meadows, NY
- White Art Museum, Cornell University, Ithaca, NY
- Rose Art Museum, Brandies University, Waltham, MA
- 2009: Frederick R. Weisman Museum of Art, Malibu, CA
