= Thiébault =

Thiébault is a French surname. Notable people with the surname include:

- Céline Thiébault-Martinez (born 1974), French politician
- Dieudonné Thiébault (1733–1807), French poet
- Paul Thiébault (1769–1846), French military officer

== See also ==
- Thiebaud
- Thiébaut
