= Phillip Hefferton =

American pop artist (1933–2008)

Phillip Hefferton (July 25, 1933 – April 2, 2008) was an American pop artist from Detroit, Michigan, known for his paintings of banknotes.

== Artist ==
In 1958–9 he began drawing "common objects". In 1960 his work was featured in an Art in America article by Robert Broner on the "Young Artists Group" in Detroit. In 1960 he moved to San Francisco and began work on his first images of banknotes and in 1961 he moved to Los Angeles.

In 1962 Hefferton's work was included, along with Roy Lichtenstein, Andy Warhol, Jim Dine, Robert Dowd, Joe Goode, Edward Ruscha, and Wayne Thiebaud, in the exhibition New Painting of Common Objects, curated by Walter Hopps at the Pasadena Art Museum, the first museum survey of pop art in America.

== Family life ==
On July 24, 1987, Phillip Hefferton met his only child, Susanne-Truth Nichole Hefferton. He was 53 and she was 22. They spent the next 21 years together. He made paintings and drawings for 50 years.

== Death ==
Phillip Conrad Hefferton died at his home of kidney cancer on April 2, 2008. He left his daughter almost 200 paintings and hundreds of drawings.

== Bibliography ==
- Pop Art, Lucy R. Lippard, Praeger
- Pop Art Redefined, Barbara Rose, Praeger
- American Pop Art, Lawrence Alloway, Macmillan
- An Illustrated Dictionary of Pop, Jose Pierre, Barrons
- The Painter and The Photograph, Van Deren Coke, University of New Mexico Press
- The New Paintings, Udo Kulterman, Praeger
- California Art Review, Les Krantz, American References
- Who's Who in American Art, R.R. Bowker
- L.A. Pop in the Sixties, Ann Ayres, Newport Harbor Museum
- Pop; An International Perspective, Rizzoli
- Robert Broner, Young Artists Group, Art in America, January, 1960. (Illustration)
- John Coplans, New Paintings of Common Objects, Artforum, November, 1962. (Illustrations)
- Jean Lipton, Money for Money's Sake, Art in America, March, 1972.(Illustration)
- Robert Dowd, Gazette Beau Arts, February, 1973. (Illustration)
- Cash Art, Art in America, July 1988 (Illustration)
- Kristine McKenna, You're A Pop Artist, L.A. Times, April 23, 1989, Calendar Section. (Illustration)
- Zan Dubin, Pop Art Exhibition at Newport, L.A. Times, April 23, 1989.
- William Zimmer, A Look at Pop Art, Los Angeles Style, The New York Times, Sunday, April 29, 1990.
- Georgette Gouveia, These Artists Developed a Palette For Everyday images, Gannett Westchester New York, April 12, 1990.
- Janet Kopios, L.A. Pop in the Sixties is a Revelation and Delight, The Advocate and Greenwick Times, June 3, 1990. (Illustration)
- William Wilson, The Words the Things at Pomona, L.A. Times, September 5, 1990.
- Ivana Edwards, Exploring New Dimensions in Realm of the Coin, The New York Times, Sunday, November 17, 1991. (Illustration)
