= Paul Thiebaud =

American art dealer (1960–2010)

Paul LeBaron Thiebaud
- Born: October 10, 1960
- Died: June 19, 2010 (aged 49)
- Occupation: American art dealer
- Father: Wayne Thiebaud
- Relatives: Twinka Thiebaud (sister)

Paul LeBaron Thiebaud (October 10, 1960 – June 19, 2010) was an American art dealer who owned two influential galleries, one in New York City and the other in San Francisco. He exhibited the work of a host of lesser-known artists whom he felt it was his role to bring to a wider public audience, in addition to the work of his father, the noted pop painter Wayne Thiebaud.

== Career ==
In 1990, Paul Thiebaud partnered in business with Charles Campbell, changing its name to the Campbell-Thiebaud Gallery. In 2001, he independently founded the Paul Thiebaud Gallery in San Francisco.

== Personal life ==
His elder sister is the actress, model, and writer Twinka Thiebaud; his mother Betty is a filmmaker; and his brother Matthew is an artist as well. He had a wife, Karen, and two daughters. He died of colon cancer on June 19, 2010, at the age of 49.
