= Twinka Thiebaud =

American model (born 1945)

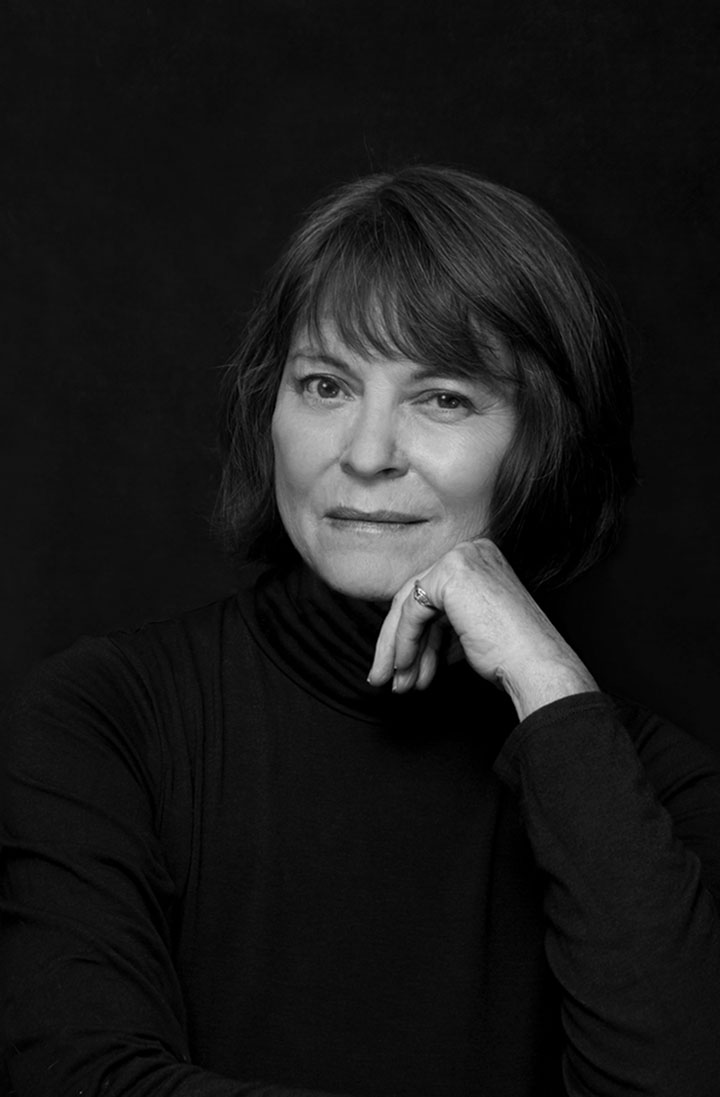
- Born: December 9, 1945 (age 80); Los Angeles, California, U.S.
- Occupations: Writer, model
- Years active: 1962–present
- Children: Sierra LeBaron Mellinger (b. 1979)
- Father: Wayne Thiebaud

Twinka Thiebaud (born December 9, 1945) is an American model who has posed for many of the most important photographers of the 20th century.

A photograph by Judy Dater depicting Thiebaud, Imogen and Twinka at Yosemite, is considered among the most iconic photos in art history, and was the first adult full-frontal nude photograph published in Life magazine. Another photo of Thiebaud by Dater is included in The Woman's Eye (1973), a book devoted to women photographers, and also served as the cover image.

== Life and career ==
=== Early life ===
Twinka is the daughter of the American painter Wayne Thiebaud and his wife Patricia (née Patterson), wed in 1943. Twinka was Wayne Thiebaud's first-born child.

Born in Los Angeles, California on December 9, 1945, Twinka was raised in Los Angeles, New York City, and Sacramento, California, where her father taught at the University of California, Davis. Upon her parents' divorce in 1958, she moved with her mother and sisters to Marin County, California, where she attended Redwood High School. Her younger brother was the art dealer and gallerist Paul Thiebaud.

=== Modeling career ===
Seeking to become an actress, Twinka returned to Los Angeles from Marin. For a number of years, she lived with the aging novelist Henry Miller in his Pacific Palisades home, acting as his cook and caretaker; a family friend of Miller, she was with him on the day he died.

Simultaneously, she worked as an artist's model, becoming a favorite of Robert Heinecken, Judy Dater, Mary Ellen Mark, Arnold Newman, Lucien Clergue, Eikoh Hosoe, Ralph Gibson, and Arthur Tress. Many of the images taken of Twinka at this time are in international private collections and have been shown in galleries and museums around the world, including the Uffizi in Florence, Italy, and in New York's Museum of Modern Art. She also posed for her father throughout her life. One canvas, painted when she was 18, called Supine Woman, sold at Sotheby's on November 12, 2009, for $1,818,500 and is owned by the Crystal Bridges Museum of American Art in Bentonville, Arkansas.

At home with Miller, Twinka discovered that he was a great talker, regaling his almost nightly guests with tales of his past and his work. Listening, she began to keep a notebook of her version of what he said each evening. Showing Henry her notes, he expressed enthusiasm, introducing her to his own publisher, Noel Young at Capra Press. The resulting book, Reflections, was published in 1981. Later living in Portland, Oregon, she published an extensive rewrite of Reflections called What Doncha Know? About Henry Miller, in February 2011.

A photograph by Judy Dater depicting Thiebaud, Imogen and Twinka at Yosemite, has become one of the most recognizable images caught by an American photographer. The photo was the first adult full-frontal nude photograph published in Life magazine. The issue of Life came out in 1976 as a Bicentennial Special Issue and was devoted to and called "Remarkable American Women 1776–1976". "Because of her work in the 1970s... and in particular because of that one photograph of Imogen and Twinka... Dater has secured herself a place in photographic history."

Another photo of Twinka by Dater is included in Anne Wilkes Tucker's compilation, The Woman's Eye (1973), a book devoted to women photographers, and also served as the cover image. Reviewing it, Anemone Hartocollis of The Harvard Crimson wrote: "These aren't demurring women about to extend or accept an invitation, they confront you with their sexuality. Some are beautiful, yet that's not what attracts attention. These women are provocative because their individuality and intellectuality aren't stifled by unctuous idealization. The photographs are precisely detailed, untouched, and of theatrical intensity. One, called 'Twinka,' is confusing. A frail, attractive girl wearing a diaphanous dress crouches at the base of a gnarled redwood, one arm spanning her breast to clutch a low branch. But her uncanny expression could never be elicited or tolerated by a male photographer: her eyes bore straight out, wide and threatening."

=== Later years ===
Thiebaud has resided in Portland, Oregon, since 1993, working as a painter, as well as for the on-campus food service company at Reed College. Commenting in 2008 on her relocation to Portland, Thiebaud said, "I wanted to be in a city where there were readers. Portland has a wonderful neighborhood feel; all these little villages strung together like a beautiful necklace."

An exhibit titled "Twinka Thiebaud and the Art of the Pose" opened June 19, 2022 at The Crocker Art Museum in Sacramento, California. The exhibit features a curated collection, captured throughout her more than 50 years as an artist's model. The exhibit featured paintings, drawings, and photographs from the 1940s through 2022, and investigated Thiebaud’s earliest modeling work, completed as a child for her father, artist Wayne Thiebaud. The Crocker also featured a concurrent exhibit celebrating 100 years of Wayne Thiebaud's works titled "Wayne Thiebaud: A Celebration, 1920-2021".

== Literature ==
- Yahr, & Crocker Art Museum, host institution. (2022). Twinka Thiebaud and the art of the pose. Hirmer Publishers.
- Yahr, Jayme (Ed.): Twinka Thiebaud and the Art of the Pose, Hirmer Publishers, Munich, 2022, ISBN 978-3-7774-3949-5
