= Judy Dater =

American photographer and feminist

- Born: Judith Rose Lichtenfeld; June 21, 1941 (age 85); Los Angeles, California, U.S.
- Education: UCLA; San Francisco State University
- Spouse(s): Jack Welpott, div. 1977; Jack B. von Euw

Judith Rose Dater (née Lichtenfeld; June 21, 1941) is an American photographer and feminist. She is celebrated for her 1974 photograph, Imogen and Twinka at Yosemite, featuring an elderly Imogen Cunningham, one of America's first woman photographers, encountering a nymph in the woods of Yosemite. The nymph is the model Twinka Thiebaud. The photo was published in Life magazine in its 1976 issue about the first 200 years of American women. Her photographs, such as her Self-Portraiture sequence, were also exhibited in the Getty Museum.

== Life ==
Dater was born in 1941 in Hollywood and grew up in Los Angeles. Her father owned a movie theater, so movies became the prism through which she viewed the world and they had a profound influence on her photography. She studied art at UCLA from 1959 to 1962 before moving to San Francisco and received a bachelor's degree in 1963 and a master's degree in 1966, both from San Francisco State University. It was there she first studied photography with Jack Welpott, whom she later married. In 1975, they published a joint work, titled Women and Other Visions. They were divorced in 1977.

In 1964, Dater met the photographer Imogen Cunningham at a workshop focusing on the life and work of Edward Weston at Big Sur Hot Springs, which later became Esalen Institute. Dater was greatly inspired by Cunningham's life and work. They shared an interest in portraiture and remained friends until Cunningham's death in 1976. Three years later, Dater published Imogen Cunningham: A Portrait, containing interviews with many of Cunningham's photographic contemporaries, friends, and family along with photographs by both Dater and Cunningham. Dater became part of the community of the west coast school of photography, primarily represented by the photographers Ansel Adams, Brett Weston, Wynn Bullock and Cunningham. They all took an interest in her work and encouraged her to pursue photography as a career.

Other books by Dater include Judy Dater: Twenty Years (1986), Body and Soul (1988), Cycles (Japanese version: 1992, American version: 1994), and Only Human: Judy Dater 1964 to 2016 Portraits and Nudes (2017).

Dater is also known for her self-portraits. She often creates characters that embody the conscious and unconscious concerns that women have. Her self-portrait series includes titles like "Ms. Cling Free" and "Leopard Woman." She also does portraits of other women, using natural light. She worked only in black-and-white photography until 1979, when she began some work in color.

She received a Guggenheim Fellowship in 1978. Dater also received two National Endowment for the Arts individual artist grants in 1976 and 1988. In 1998 she was a visiting artist at the American Academy in Rome.

Judy Dater lives in Berkeley, California with her husband Jack B. von Euw. Her career has been long and varied, combining teaching, creating books, traveling abroad and conducting workshops, making prints, videos, and photographing continually.

== Photography ==
Judy Dater uses photography as an instrument for challenging traditional conceptions of the female body. Her early work paralleled the emergence of the feminist movement and her work became strongly associated with it. At a time when female frontal nudity was considered risqué Dater pushed the boundaries by taking pictures of the naked female body. However, she did so in a way which did not objectify her subject which was in many cases, herself. Dater began taking photographs in the 1960s and she is still taking photographs today. Mark Johnstone, an Idaho resident whom Dater photographed in the early 80's remarked that “During this time, she never got swayed by or indulged in trends, but moved with her own vision. She’s one of the few successful women in the art world, especially photography, who never depended on ongoing academic support to fuel and expand her artistic exploration.”

While her subject and message remained relatively constant throughout her career, Dater experimented with a variety of compositions as her career developed. Her photographs, and in particular, her portraits (which she specializes in) are taken in both black and white, and in color. She has taken portraits in the Southwestern desert and also posed as female stereotypes in a more obvious display of activism. Her 1982 portrait "Ms. Clingfree” demonstrated the latter as Dater posed with an assortment of cleaning supplies.

She was influenced by the vital cultural intersection of photography and feminism, and the second wave of feminism which started in the 1960s and lasted up till the 1980s. In the 1980s, much has changed and the country as a whole became more conservative in areas of political life. The gains of the women's movement began to slow, and many feminists became discouraged with the continuation of sexist attitudes and behavior. Through her powerful photography and personal sense of style, Dater was able to surpass these conservative values and was able to effectively convey her views to her audience.

One of her famous photograph sequences taken in the 1980s, known as the Self-Portraiture sequence, exploited themes such as identity, feminism, and the human connection with nature. She effectively conveyed these themes and delivered, through her photography, the stories of women's lives, relationships, and personal emotions. For example, in her photograph titled, My Hands, Death Valley, Dater presents the theme of feminism through the placement of the artist's hands on the car's glass window; her hands are crinkled, which is a sign of aging. The theme of personal identity is explored in connection with the theme of feminism. The background is of the hazy Death Valley, the grounds are dry, her hands are weathered, and she's trying to force open a car window. The theme of human's connection with nature is exploited by taking the photograph in a natural landscape setting, and putting herself out there.

From April 7 – September 16, 2018, the de Young Museum, San Francisco exhibited Judy Dater: Only Human; the exhibit displayed photographs created over five decades and was her first exhibition in over 20 years.
