= Edward Ruscha =

American artist (born 1937)

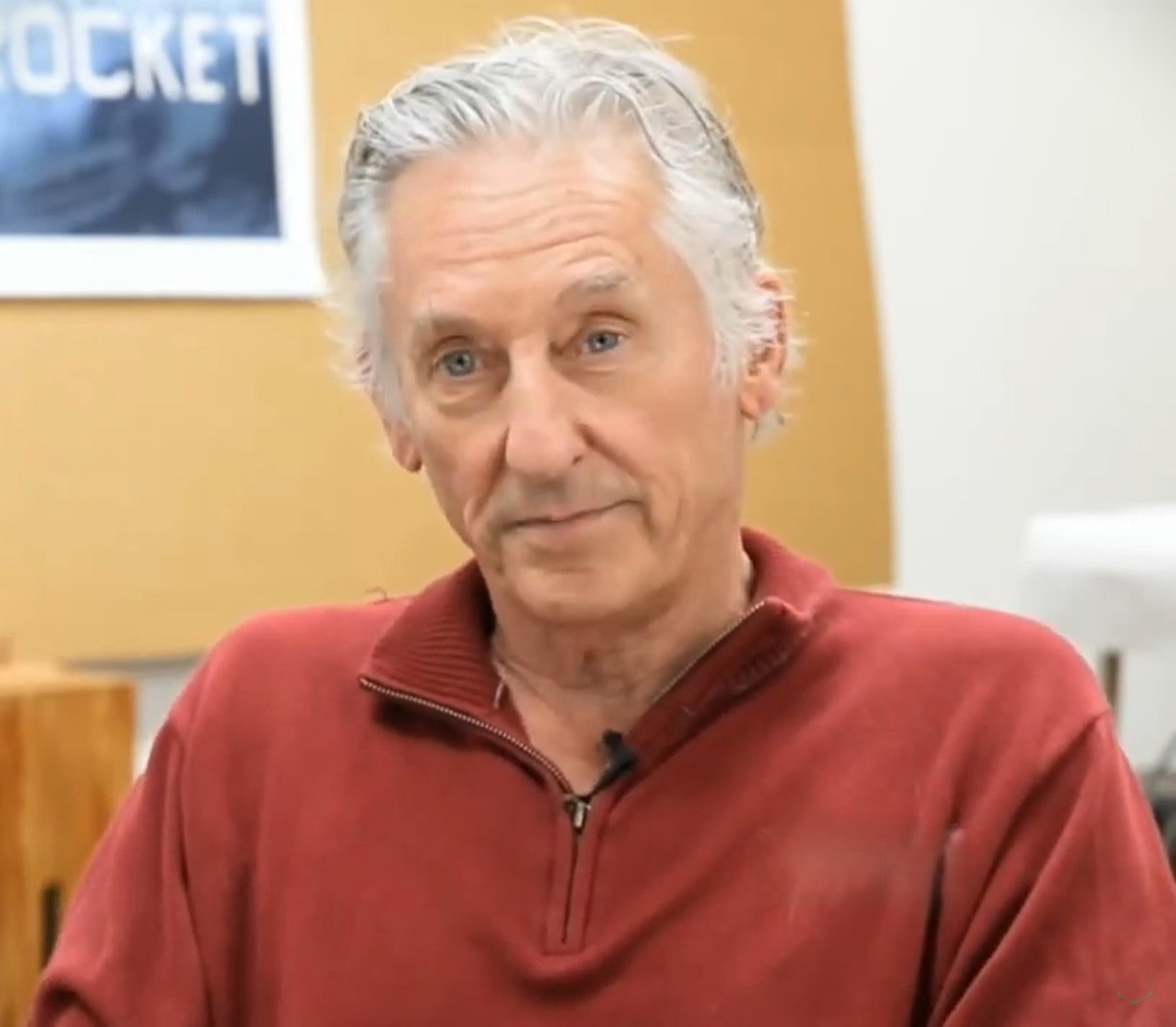
- Ruscha in 2016
- Born: Edward Joseph Ruscha IV; December 16, 1937 (age 88); Omaha, Nebraska, U.S.
- Education: Chouinard Art Institute
- Known for: Painting, photography, printmaking, film, book art
- Notable work: Large Trademark with Eight Spotlights (1961); Every Building on the Sunset Strip (1966); Standard Station (1966)
- Movement: Pop art
- Spouses: Danica Knego (m. 1967; div. 1978); (m. 1987)
- Awards: Guggenheim Fellowship (1971)

Edward Joseph Ruscha IV (/ruːˈʃeɪ/, roo-SHAY; born December 16, 1937) is an American artist associated with the pop art movement. He has worked in the media of painting, printmaking, drawing, photography, and film. He is also noted for creating several artist's books. Ruscha lives and works in Culver City, California.

== Early life and education ==
Ruscha was born into a Roman Catholic family in Omaha, Nebraska, with an older sister, Shelby, and a younger brother, Paul. Edward Ruscha, Sr. was an auditor for Hartford Insurance Company. Ruscha's mother was supportive of her son's early signs of artistic skill and interests. Young Ruscha was attracted to cartooning and would sustain this interest throughout his adolescent years. Though born in Nebraska, Ruscha lived some 15 years in Oklahoma City before moving to Los Angeles in 1956 where he studied at the Chouinard Art Institute (now known as the California Institute of the Arts) under Robert Irwin and Emerson Woelffer from 1956 through 1960. While at Chouinard, Ruscha edited and produced the journal Orb (1959–60) together with Joe Goode, Emerson Woelffer, Stephan von Huene, Jerry McMillan, and others. As a result, Orb became one of the U.S.' first recorded alternative newspapers.

In 1961, Ruscha spent seven months traveling through Europe. After graduation, Ruscha took a job as a layout artist for the Carson-Roberts advertising agency in Los Angeles.

By the early 1960s he was well known for his paintings, collages, and photographs, and for his association with the Ferus Gallery group, which also included artists Robert Irwin, John Altoon, John McCracken, Larry Bell, Ken Price, and Edward Kienholz. He worked as layout designer for Artforum magazine under the pseudonym "Eddie Russia" from 1965 to 1969 and taught at UCLA as a visiting professor for printing and drawing in 1969. He is also a lifelong friend of guitarist Mason Williams.

== Work ==
Ruscha achieved recognition for paintings incorporating words and phrases and for his many photographic books, all influenced by the deadpan irreverence of the Pop Art movement. His textual, flat paintings have been linked with both the Pop Art movement and the Beat Generation.

=== Early influences ===
While in school in 1957, Ruscha chanced upon then unknown Jasper Johns' Target with Four Faces in the magazine Print and has credited Johns's work as a source of inspiration for his change of interest from graphic arts to painting. He was also impacted by John McLaughlin's paintings, the work of H.C. Westermann, Arthur Dove's 1925 painting Goin' Fishin', Alvin Lustig's cover illustrations for New Directions Press, and much of Marcel Duchamp's work. In a 1961 tour of Europe, Ruscha came upon more works by Johns and Robert Rauschenberg, R. A. Bertelli's Head of Mussolini, and Ophelia by Sir John Everett Millais. Some critics point out the influence of Edward Hopper's Gas (1940) in Ruscha's 1963 oil painting, Standard Station, Amarillo, Texas. To the question of influence, Ruscha has said, "Art has to be something that makes you scratch your head."

=== Southern California ===
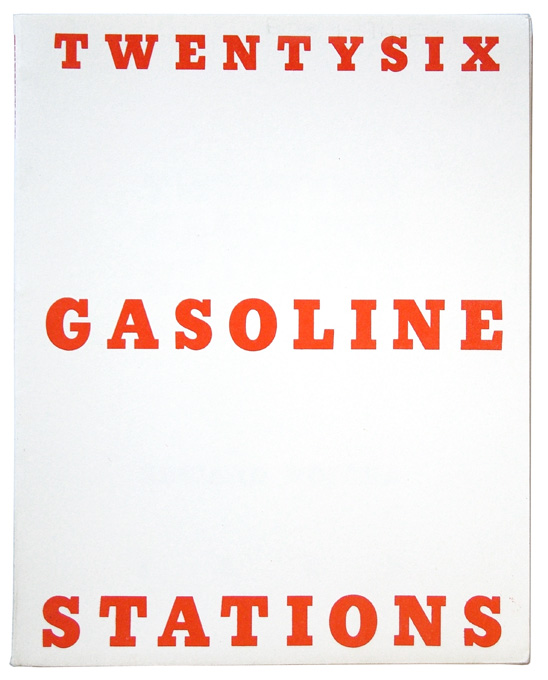
Twentysix Gasoline Stations, 1963, by Ruscha

Although Ruscha denies this in interviews, the vernacular of Los Angeles and Southern California landscapes contributes to the themes and styles central to much of Ruscha's paintings, drawings, and books. Examples of this include the publication Every Building on the Sunset Strip (1966), a book of continuous photographs of a two and one half mile stretch of the 24 mile boulevard. In 1973, following the model of Every Building on the Sunset Strip, he photographed the entire length of Hollywood Boulevard with a motorized camera. Also, paintings like Standard Station (1966), Large Trademark (1962), and Hollywood (1982) exemplify Ruscha's kinship with the Southern California visual language. Two of these paintings, Standard and Large Trademark were emulated out of car parts in 2008 by Brazilian photographer Vik Muniz as a commentary on Los Angeles and its car culture.

His work is also strongly influenced by the Hollywood film industry: the mountain in his Mountain Series is a play on the Paramount Pictures logo; Large Trademark with Eight Spotlights (1962) depicts the 20th Century Fox logo, while the dimensions of this work are reminiscent of a movie screen; in his painting The End (1991) these two words, which comprised the final shot in all black-and-white films, are surrounded by scratches and streaks reminiscent of damaged celluloid. Also, the proportions of the Hollywood print seems to mimic the Cinemascope screen (however, to make the word "Hollywood", Ruscha transposed the letters of the sign from their actual location on the slope of the Santa Monica Mountains to the crest of the ridge).

Ruscha completed Large Trademark with Eight Spotlights in 1961, one year after graduating from college. Among his first paintings (SU (1958–1960), Sweetwater (1959)) this is the most widely known, and exemplifies Ruscha's interests in popular culture, word depictions, and commercial graphics that would continue to inform his work throughout his career. Large Trademark was quickly followed by Standard Station (1963) and Wonder Bread (1962). In Norm's, La Cienega, on Fire (1964), Burning Gas Station (1965–66), and Los Angeles County Museum of Art on Fire (1965–68), Ruscha brought flames into play. In 1966, Ruscha reproduced Standard Station in a silkscreen print using a split-fountain printing technique, introducing a gradation of tone in the background of the print, with variations following in 1969 (Mocha Standard, Cheese Mold Standard with Olive, and Double Standard).

In 1985, Ruscha begins a series of "City Lights" paintings, where grids of bright spots on dark grounds suggest aerial views of the city at night. More recently, his "Metro Plots" series chart the various routes that transverse the city of Los Angeles by rendering schematized street maps and blow-ups of its neighborhood sections, such as in Alvarado to Doheny (1998). The paintings are grey and vary in their degrees of light and dark, therefore appearing as they were done by pencil in the stippling technique. A 2003 portfolio of prints called Los Francisco San Angeles shows street intersections from San Francisco and LA juxtaposed one over the other.

=== Word paintings ===
As with Andy Warhol and Roy Lichtenstein, his East Coast counterparts, Ruscha's artistic training was rooted in commercial art. His interest in words and typography ultimately provided the primary subject of his paintings, prints and photographs. The very first of Ruscha's word paintings were created as oil paintings on paper in Paris in 1961. He began to isolate monosyllables — ACE, BOSS, HONK, OOF — without additional imagery against solid backgrounds.

Since 1964, Ruscha has been experimenting regularly with painting and drawing words and phrases, often oddly comic and satirical sayings alluding to popular culture and life in LA. When asked where he got his inspiration for his paintings, Ruscha responded, "Well, they just occur to me; sometimes people say them and I write down and then I paint them. Sometimes I use a dictionary." From 1966 to 1969, Ruscha painted his "liquid word" paintings: Words such as Adios (1967), Steel (1967–9) and Desire (1969) were written as if with liquid spilled, dribbled or sprayed over a flat monochromatic surface. His gunpowder and graphite drawings (made during a period of self-imposed exile from painting from 1967 to 1970) feature single words depicted in a trompe l'oeil technique, as if the words are formed from ribbons of curling paper. Experimenting with humorous sounds and rhyming word plays, Ruscha made a portfolio of seven mixed-media lithographs with the rhyming words, News, Mews, Pews, Brews, Stews, Dues, News (1970).

In the 1970s, Ruscha, with Barbara Kruger and Jenny Holzer, among others, began using entire phrases in their works, thereby making it a distinctive characteristic of the post-Pop Art generation. During the mid-1970s, he made a series of drawings in pastel using pithy phrases against a field of color. He also congregated with artists including George Condo. In the early 1980s he produced a series of paintings of words over sunsets, night skies and wheat fields. In the photo-realist painting Brave Men Run In My Family (1988), part of the artist's "Dysfuntional Family" series, Ruscha runs the text over the silhouetted image of a great, listing tall ship; the piece was a collaboration with fellow Los Angeles artist Nancy Reese (she did the painting, he the lettering). In a series of insidious small abstract paintings from 1994 to 1995, words forming threats are rendered as blank widths of contrasting color like Morse code. Later, words appeared on a photorealist mountain-range series which Ruscha started producing in 1998. For these acrylic-on-canvas works, Ruscha pulled his mountain images either from photographs, commercial logos, or from his imagination.

From 1980, Ruscha started using an all-caps typeface of his own invention named "Boy Scout Utility Modern" in which curved letter forms are squared-off (as in the Hollywood Sign) This simple font is radically different from the style he used in works such as Honk (1962). Beginning in the mid-1980s, in many of his paintings black or white 'blanks' or 'censor strips' are included, to suggest where the 'missing' words would have been placed. The 'blanks' would also feature in his series of Silhouette, Cityscapes or 'censored' word works, often made in bleach on canvas, rayon or linen.

=== Surrealism ===
Paintings like Angry Because It's Plaster, Not Milk (1965) and Strange Catch for a Fresh Water Fish (1965) are exemplary works from Ruscha's group of paintings from the mid-1960s that take the strict idea of literal representation into the realm of the absurd. This body of work is characterized by what the artist termed "bouncing objects, floating things," such as a radically oversized red bird and glass hovering in front of a simple background in the work and have a strong affinity to Surrealism, a recurring theme in the artist's career. The fish plays a prominent role throughout the series and appears in nearly half of the paintings. Another frequent element is Ruscha's continuous depiction of a graphite pencil – broken, splintered, melted, transformed.

=== Odd media ===
Fruit Metrecal Hollywood by Edward Ruscha, 1971, Honolulu Museum of Art

In his drawings, prints, and paintings throughout the 1970s, Ruscha experimented with a range of materials including gunpowder, vinyl, blood, red wine, fruit and vegetable juices, axle grease, chocolate syrup, tomato paste, bolognese sauce, cherry pie, coffee, caviar, daffodils, tulips, raw eggs and grass stains. Stains, an editioned portfolio of 75 stained sheets of paper produced and published by Ruscha in 1969, bears the traces of a variety of materials and fluids. In the portfolio of screenprints News, Mews, Pews, Brews, Stews, Dues (1970), produced at Editions Alecto, London, rhyming words appear in Gothic typeface, printed in edible substances such as pie fillings, bolognese sauce, caviar, and chocolate syrup. Ruscha has also produced his word paintings with food products on moiré and silks, since they were more stain-absorbent; paintings like A Blvd. Called Sunset (1975) were executed in blackberry juice on moiré. However, these most vibrant and varied organic colorings usually dried to a range of muted greys, mustards and browns. His portfolio Insects (1972) consists of six screen prints – three on paper, three on paper-backed wood veneer, each showing a lifelike swarm of a different meticulously detailed species. For the April 1972 cover of ARTnews, he composed an Arcimboldo-like photograph that spelled out the magazine's title in a salad of squashed foods. Ruscha's Fruit Metrecal Hollywood (1971) is an example of the artist's use of unusual materials, this silkscreen of the "Hollywood" sign is rendered in apricot and grape jam and the diet drink Metrecal on paper.

=== Motifs in light ===
Notably different from many of Ruscha's works of the same period, most obviously in its exclusion of text, his series of Miracle pastel drawings from in the mid-1970s show bright beams of light burst forth from skies with dark clouds. An overall glow is created by the black pastel not being completely opaque, allowing the paper to shine through. In the 1980s, a more subtle motif began to appear, again in a series of drawings, some incorporating dried vegetable pigments: a mysterious patch of light cast by an unseen window that serves as background for phrases such as WONDER SICKNESS (1984) and 99% DEVIL, 1% ANGEL (1983). By the 1990s, Ruscha was creating larger paintings of light projected into empty rooms, some with ironic titles such as An Exhibition of Gasoline Powered Engines (1993).

=== Commissioned works ===
Ruscha's first major public commissions include a monumental mural at the Museum of Contemporary Art, San Diego (1966) and a seventy-panel, 360-degree work for the Great Hall of Denver Public Library in Colorado (1995). Created as part of a public-art commission, The Back of Hollywood (1976–77) was made from a large sheet of sateen on a billboard and situated opposite the Los Angeles County Museum of Art, designed to be read in the rear-view mirror of a moving car. In 1985 Ruscha was commissioned to design a series of fifty murals, WORDS WITHOUT THOUGHTS NEVER TO HEAVEN GO (a quotation from Hamlet), for the rotunda of Miami–Dade Public Library (now the Miami Art Museum) in Florida, designed by architects Philip Johnson and John Burgee.

In 1989, Ruscha decorated a pool for his brother Paul at his house in Studio City, Los Angeles, with a supersized luggage label: on a black tiled background are the words Name, Address and Phone, complete with dotted lines.

In 1998, Ruscha was commissioned to produce a nearly thirty-foot high vertical painting entitled PICTURE WITHOUT WORDS, for the lobby of the Harold M. Williams Auditorium of the Getty Center. He produced another site-specific piece, three 13-by-23-foot panels proclaiming Words In Their Best Order, for the offices of Gannett Company publishers in Tysons Corner, Virginia, in 2002. The artist was later asked by the M. H. de Young Memorial Museum to create two large-scale paintings that flank his A Particular Kind of Heaven (1983), which is in the museum's collection, to form a spectacular, monumental triptych. For his first public commission in New York in 2014, Ruscha created the hand-painted mural Honey, I Twisted Through More Damn Traffic Today for a temporary installation at the High Line.

In 2008, Ruscha was among four text-based artists that were invited by the Whitechapel Gallery to write scripts to be performed by leading actors; Ruscha's contribution was Public Notice (2007). To celebrate the San Francisco Museum of Modern Art (SFMOMA)'s 75th anniversary, Ruscha was one of the artists invited to collaborate with the museum on a limited-edition of artist-designed T-shirts. Ruscha is regularly commissioned with works for private persons, among them James Frey (Public Stoning, 2007), Lauren Hutton (Boy Meets Girl, 1987), and Stella McCartney (Stella, 2001). In 1987, collector Frederick Weisman had Ruscha paint the exterior of his private plane, a Lockheed JetStar. The summer 2012 campaign of L.A.-based fashion label Band of Outsiders featured Polaroid shots of Ruscha. In 2020, Ruscha produced the cover art and typography of Paul McCartney's album McCartney III. In 2022, he teamed up with (RED) and Gagosian Gallery to create a limited-edition silk twill scarf—featuring his drawing Science Is Truth Found (1986)—to help provide more equitable access to COVID-19 relief. In 2023 he created the cover art for the Beatles single Now and Then. In 2026, his piece 'TOP SPOT', 2019, was selected as the cover for South Korean rapper T.O.P's debut solo album, Another Dimension.

=== Books ===
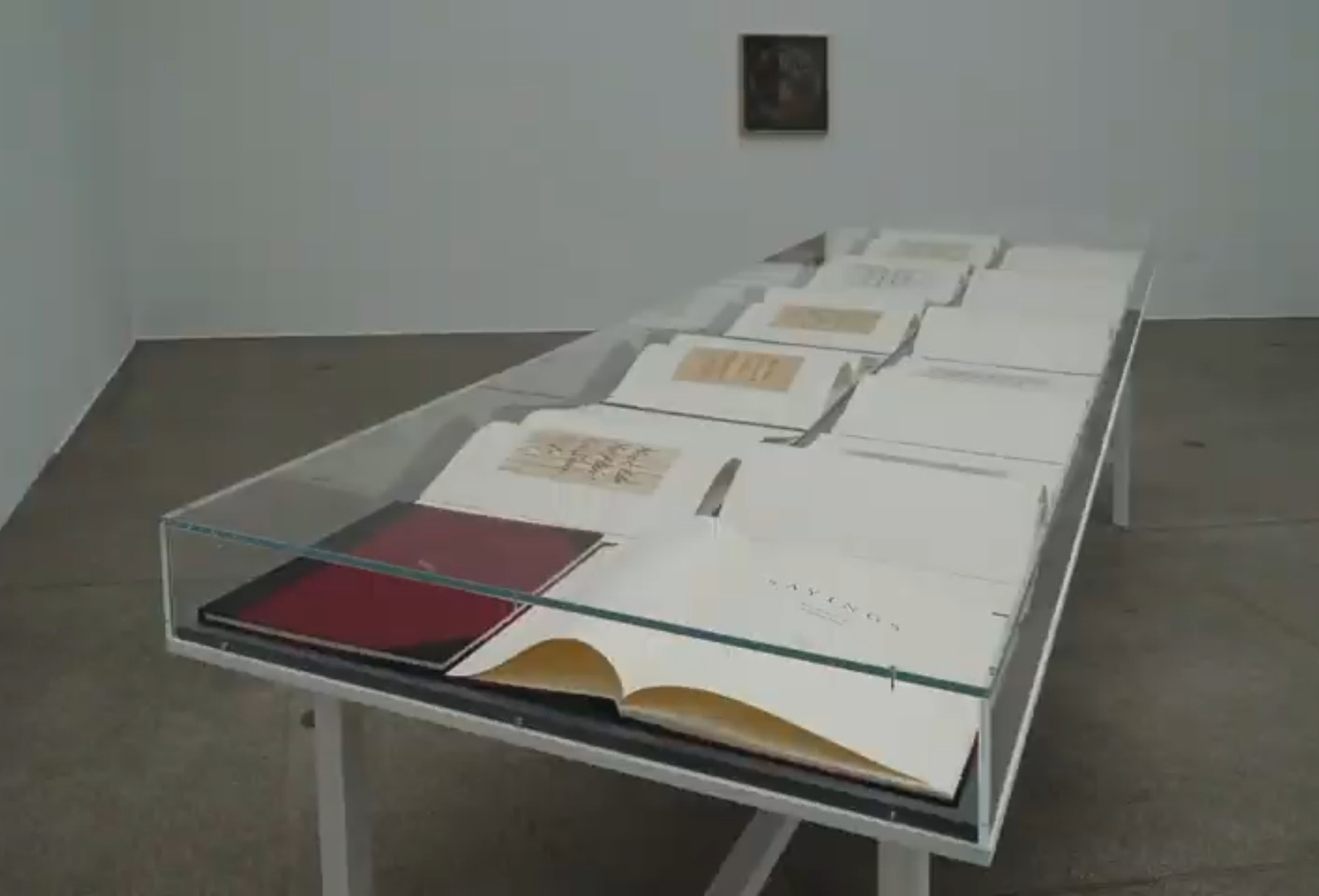
Ruscha's books on display as part of a 2018 exhibition

Between 1962 and 1978, Ruscha produced sixteen small artist's books:

- Twentysix Gasoline Stations, 1963
- Various Small Fires, 1964
- Some Los Angeles Apartments, 1965
- Every Building on the Sunset Strip, 1966
- Thirtyfour Parking Lots, 1967
- Royal Road Test, 1967 (with Mason Williams and Patrick Blackwell)
- Business Cards, 1968 (with Billy Al Bengston)
- Nine Swimming Pools and a Broken Glass, 1968
- Crackers, 1969 (with Mason Williams)
- Real Estate Opportunities, 1970
- Babycakes with Weights, 1970
- A Few Palm Trees, 1971
- Records, 1971
- Dutch Details, 1971
- Colored People, 1972
- Hard Light, 1978 (with Lawrence Weiner)

Later book projects include:

- Country Cityscapes, 2001
- ME and THE, 2002
- Ed Ruscha and Photography, 2004 (with Sylvia Wolf)
- OH / NO, 2008
- Dirty Baby, 2010 (with Nels Cline and David Breskin)

In 1968, Ruscha created the cover design for the catalogue accompanying a Billy Al Bengston exhibition at the Los Angeles County Museum of Art. For the "Documenta 5" catalogue in 1972, he designed an orange vinyl cover, featuring a "5" made up of scurrying black ants. In 1978, he designed the catalogue "Stella Since 1970" for the Modern Art Museum of Fort Worth. Leave Any Information at the Signal, a volume of Ruscha's writings, was published by MIT Press in 2002. In 2010, Gagosian Gallery and Steidl published Ruscha's version of Jack Kerouac's novel On the Road in an edition of 350.

Ruscha's artist books have proved to be deeply influential, beginning with Bruce Nauman's Burning Small Fires (1968), for which Nauman burned Ruscha's Various Small Fires and Milk (1964) and photographed the process. More than forty years later, photographer Charles Johnstone relocated Ruscha's Twentysix Gasoline Stations in Cuba, producing the portfolio Twentysix Havana Gasoline Stations (2008). A recent homage is One Swimming Pool (2013) by Dutch artist Elisabeth Tonnard, who re-photographed one of the photographs from Ruscha's Nine Swimming Pools and a Broken Glass (1968) and enlarged it to the size of a small swimming pool, consisting of 3164 pages the same size as the pages in Ruscha's original book. The pages of this 'pool on a shelf' can be detached to create the life-size installation.

=== Photography ===
Photography has played a crucial role throughout Ruscha's career, beginning with images he made during a trip to Europe with his mother and brother in 1961, and most memorably as the imagery for more than a dozen books that present precisely what their titles describe. His photographs are straightforward, even deadpan, in their depiction of subjects that are not generally thought of as having aesthetic qualities. His "Products" pictures, for example, feature boxes of Sunmaid raisins and Oxydol detergent and a can of Sherwin Williams turpentine in relatively formal still lifes. Mostly devoid of human presence, these photographs emphasize the essential form of the structure and its placement within the built environment. Ruscha's photographic editions are most often based on his conceptual art-books of same or similar name. Ruscha re-worked the negatives of six of the images from his book Every Building on Sunset Strip. The artist then cut and painted directly on the negatives, resulting in photographs that have the appearance of a faded black-and-white film. The Tropical Fish series (1974–75) represents the first instance where the photographic image has been directly used in his graphic work, where Ruscha had Gemini G.E.L.'s house photographer Malcolm Lubliner make photographs of a range of common domestic objects.

=== Films and documentaries ===
In the 1970s, Ruscha also made a series of largely unknown short movies, such as Premium (1971) and Miracle (1975). With the assistance of a Guggenheim Fellowship, Ruscha arranged in Premium a scenario which he first projected in his photo-book Crackers from 1969 and subsequently transformed into a film which features Larry Bell, Leon Bing, Rudi Gernreich, and Tommy Smothers. Miracle contains the essence of the artist's same-named painting, inasmuch as the story is told of a strange day in the life of an auto mechanic, who is magically transformed as he rebuilds the carburetor on a 1965 Ford Mustang. The movie features Jim Ganzer and Michelle Phillips.

In 1984, Rusch accepted a small role in the film Choose Me directed by his friend Alan Rudolph, and in 2010, he starred in Doug Aitken's film Sleepwalkers. Artist Tom Sachs' 2018 short film Paradox Bullets stars Ruscha in the role of a hiker lost in the desert and guided only by the voice of Werner Herzog. In 2002, Alejandro González Iñárritu offered Ruscha the role of the gynecologist in 21 Grams which the latter declined due to scheduling conflicts.

Ruscha was featured in Michael Blackwood's film documentary American Art in the Sixties. He appeared in L.A. Suggested by the Art of Edward Ruscha, a 1981 documentary by Gary Conklin shot at the artist's studio and desert home. Interviews with Ruscha are included in the documentaries Dennis Hopper: The Decisive Moments (2002), Sketches of Frank Gehry (2005), The Cool School (2008), Iconoclasts (2008), and How to Make a Book with Steidl (2010), among others.

== Exhibitions ==
=== Birth of "Pop Art" ===
In 1962 Ruscha's work was included, along with Roy Lichtenstein, Andy Warhol, Robert Dowd, Phillip Hefferton, Joe Goode, Jim Dine, and Wayne Thiebaud, in the historically important and ground-breaking New Painting of Common Objects, curated by Walter Hopps at the Pasadena Art Museum. This exhibition is historically considered one of the first "Pop Art" exhibitions in America.

Ruscha had his first solo exhibition in 1963 at the Ferus Gallery in Los Angeles. In 1966, Ruscha was included in "Los Angeles Now" at the Robert Fraser Gallery in London, his first European exhibition. In 1968, he had his first European solo show in Cologne, Germany, at Galerie Rudolf Zwirner. Ruscha joined the Leo Castelli Gallery in 1970 and had his first solo exhibition there in 1973.

=== Retrospectives ===
In 1970 Ruscha represented the United States at the Venice Biennale as part of a survey of American printmaking with an on-site workshop. He constructed Chocolate Room, a visual and sensory experience where the visitor saw 360 pieces of paper permeated with chocolate and hung like shingles on the gallery walls. The pavilion in Venice smelled like a chocolate factory. For the Venice Biennale in 1976, Ruscha created an installation entitled Vanishing Cream, consisting of letters written in Vaseline petroleum jelly on a black wall. Ruscha was the United States representative at the 51st Venice Biennale in 2005, showing the site- and occasion-specific a painting cycle Course of Empire. He was interviewed about the pavilion and its curation by Linda Norden and Donna De Salvo in Sarah Thornton's Seven Days in the Art World.

He has been the subject of numerous museum retrospectives, beginning in 1983 with the San Francisco Museum of Modern Art (traveling to the Whitney Museum of American Art, the Vancouver Art Gallery, the San Antonio Museum of Art, and the Los Angeles County Museum of Art), the Centre Georges Pompidou in 1989, the Hirshhorn Museum and Sculpture Garden in 2000, and the Museo Nacional Centro de Arte Reina Sofia in 2001. In 2004, the Museum of Contemporary Art in Sydney mounted a selection of the artist's photographs, paintings, books and drawings that traveled to the Museo Nazionale delle Arti del XXI Secolo, Rome and to the Scottish National Gallery of Modern Art.

In 1998, the J. Paul Getty Museum in Los Angeles organized a retrospective solely devoted to Ruscha's works on paper. In 2004, The Whitney Museum of American Art exhibited a second Ruscha drawing retrospective, which traveled to the Museum of Contemporary Art, Los Angeles, and then to the National Gallery of Art, Washington, D.C.

In 1999, the Walker Art Center mounted Edward Ruscha: Editions 1959-1999, a major retrospective of the artist's prints, books, and graphic works, which number well over 300. The show travelled to the LACMA in 2000. Ruscha coauthored the catalogue raisonné with Walker curator Siri Engberg. In July 2012, Reading Ed Ruscha opened at the Kunsthaus Bregenz in Austria.

In 2006, an exhibition of Ruscha's photographs was organized for the Jeu de Paume in Paris, the Kunsthaus Zürich, and the Museum Ludwig in Cologne.

In October 2009, London's Hayward Gallery featured the first retrospective to focus exclusively on Ruscha's canvases. Entitled Ed Ruscha: Fifty Years of Painting, the exhibition sheds light on his influences, such as comics, graphic design, and hitchhiking. The exhibition travelled to Haus der Kunst, Munich, and the Moderna Museet, Stockholm. Ed Ruscha: Road Tested, opened at the Modern Art Museum of Fort Worth, Texas in January 2011. The Hammer Museum in Los Angeles prepared an exhibition with Ruscha inspired by Jack Kerouac's On the Road, which opened in mid-2011 (traveled to Denver Art Museum, Colorado in December 2011 and Museum of Contemporary Art, North Miami, Florida in May 2012).

In 2016, there was a large 99 piece exhibit of Ruscha's paintings and prints in San Francisco's M. H. de Young Memorial Museum. The exhibit, Ed Ruscha and the Great American West, focuses primarily on how the artist drew inspiration from the American West. In 1956, Ruscha drove from his home in Oklahoma to Los Angeles where he hoped to attend art school. While driving in a 1950 Ford sedan, the 18 year old artist drew inspiration from dilapidated gas stations, billboards, and telephone poles cross the great expanse of the land. This inspiration from the American West across Route 66 stuck with Ruscha his whole life. The artists paintings of the West reflect both symbolic and ironic renditions of how we imagine the West.

In 2018, The Harry Ransom Center in Austin, Texas presented Ed Ruscha: Archaeology and Romance, featuring more than 150 objects drawn from the Ransom Center's Edward Ruscha Papers and Art Collection.

From September 2023 to January 2024, the Museum of Modern Art in New York City exhibited the retrospective ED RUSCHA / NOW THEN featuring over 200 works across mediums, including The Chocolate Room.

=== Curating ===
In 2003, Ed Ruscha curated Emerson Woelffer: A Solo Flight, a survey of the work of the late Los Angeles-based Abstract Expressionist, for the inaugural exhibition of the Gallery at REDCAT (Roy and Edna Disney/CalArts Theater). In 2012, Ruscha was invited to curate The Ancients Stole All Our Great Ideas at the Kunsthistorisches Museum in Vienna, the first exhibition in a series for which internationally renowned artists were invited to work with the national art and natural history collections.

== Collections ==
In 2000, the Achenbach Foundation for Graphic Arts, a branch of Fine Arts Museums of San Francisco, acquired Ruscha's complete graphic archive of 325 prints and 800 working proofs. The museum bought the archive and negotiated for impressions of future prints for $10 million, with funds provided by San Francisco philanthropist Phyllis Wattis. Another major collection of Ruscha's prints was compiled by the Los Angeles County Museum of Art. In 2003, the Museum of Contemporary Art in Los Angeles acquired the Chocolate Room, then worth about $1.5 million. In 2004, the Whitney Museum acquired more than 300 photographs through a purchase and gift from the artist, making it the principal repository of Ruscha's photographic oevre. The gift, purchased from Larry Gagosian, includes vintage photographs that Ruscha took on a seven-month European tour in 1961. In 2005, Leonard A. Lauder purchased The Old Tool & Die Building (2004) and The Old Trade School Building (2005) for the Whitney, both of which were part of "The Course of Empire: Paintings by Ed Ruscha" at the Venice Biennale. Ruscha is represented by 33 of his works in the permanent collection of the Museum of Contemporary Art, Los Angeles; the San Francisco Museum of Modern Art owns 25 Ruscha paintings, works on paper, and photographs; the Hirshhorn Museum and Sculpture Garden has 21 Ruschas in its permanent collection; and the Art Institute of Chicago has more than 40 works by the artist in their collection. Ruscha also has small collections of books and lithographs in the Utah Museum of Fine Arts in Salt Lake City, Utah and in Château de Montsoreau-Museum of Contemporary Art in Montsoreau, France.

Ruscha's private collectors have in the past included Leonardo DiCaprio, Owen Wilson and Jay-Z.

== Awards ==
- 2001: Elected to the American Academy of Arts and Letters as a member of the Department of Art, after having previously received its Hassam, Speicher, Betts, and Symons Purchase Fund Award in 1992'.
- 2001: Honorary doctorate degree from California College of the Arts
- 2002: amfAR's Award of Excellence for Artistic Contributions to the Fight Against AIDS
- 2004: Honorary Royal Academician of London's Royal Academy of Arts
- 2006: The Cultural Award from the German Society for Photography (DGPh)
- 2008: Aspen Award for Art
- 2008: Honorary doctorate degree from Rhode Island School of Design
- 2009: National Arts Award for Artistic Excellence
- 2009: Honorary doctorate degree from San Francisco Art Institute
- 2013: Named in Time's annual list of the 100 most influential people in the world
- 2013: Honored on the occasion of the Whitney Museum of American Art's annual gala event
- 2019: J. Paul Getty Medal
- 2024: Honorary doctorate from Occidental College.

== Recognition ==
Fellow artist Louise Lawler included Ruscha in her piece Birdcalls (1972/2008), an audio artwork that transforms the names of famous male artists into a bird song, parroting names such as Artschwager, Beuys, and Warhol in a mockery of conditions of privilege and recognition given to male artists at that time. The muralist Kent Twitchell painted an 11,000-square-foot mural in Downtown Los Angeles to honor Ruscha entitled the Ed Ruscha Monument between 1978 and 1987. The mural was preserved until 2006 when it was illegally painted over. The band Talking Heads Ruscha's eponymous 1974 painting for their Sand in the Vaseline compilation album. The band Various Cruelties, based around Liam O'Donnell, was named after Ruscha's painting of the same name of 1974.

Between 2006 and 2012, Ruscha served on the board of trustees of the Museum of Contemporary Art (MoCA) in Los Angeles where he had previously been included in eight special exhibits. In 2012, he was the honoree of the Los Angeles County Museum of Art's Art + Film gala; in a speech, the museums's director Michal Govan paid tribute to the artist, quoting the novelist J. G. Ballard: "Ed Ruscha has the coolest gaze in American art." Ruscha was elected to a three-year term on the board of trustees of the San Francisco Museum of Modern Art in 2013. From 2015 until 2019, Ruscha also served on the board of Desert X; he resigned over the board's decision to collaborate on an exhibition in Saudi Arabia.

In 2009, Ruscha's I Think I'll... (1983) from the collection of the National Gallery was installed at the White House. In 2010, during British prime minister David Cameron's first visit to Washington, President Barack Obama presented him with a signed two-color lithograph by Ruscha, Column With Speed Lines (2003), chosen for its red, white and blue colors. Obama gave Australian Prime Minister Tony Abbott a similar lithograph during his visit to the White House in 2014. Ruscha's Screaming in Spanish (2013) was installed in the entry hall of the residence of the United States Ambassador to Spain in Madrid.

== Art market ==
After joining the Leo Castelli Gallery in 1970, Ruscha received a stipend but rarely sold his work. His first sold-out exhibition was held in 1986 at the Robert Miller Gallery, featuring his spray-gun silhouette paintings.

As early as 2002, the oil on canvas word painting Talk About Space (1963), a takeoff on the American billboard in which a single word is the subject, was expected to sell for $1.5 million to $2 million from a private European collection. It was eventually sold for $3.5 million at Christie's in New York, a record for the artist. In 2008, Eli Broad acquired Ruscha's "liquid word" painting Desire (1969) for $2.4 million at Sotheby's, which back then was 40 percent under the $4 million low estimate. A navy blue canvas with the word Smash in yellow, which Ruscha painted in 1963, was purchased by Larry Gagosian for $30.4 million at a 2014 Christie's auction in New York. His word painting Hurting the Word Radio #2 (1964) sold by L.A. collectors Joan and Jack Quinn to an anonymous bidder at Christie's for a record-shattering $52.5 million with fees in 2019. This record was broken by Standard Station, Ten-Cent Western Being Torn in Half (1964), who sold by $68,260,000 at Christie’s New York, on 24 November 2024.

Burning Standard (1968) from the collection of Alan and Dorothy Press, which sold for $22.2 million with fees at Christie's New York in 2023, is the most valuable of Ruscha gas station paintings to sell at auction to date.

Angry Because It's Plaster, Not Milk from 1965, which had been shown at Ferus Gallery that year, was sold by Halsey Minor to Gagosian Gallery for $3.2 million at Phillips de Pury & Company, New York, in 2010. From the same series, Strange Catch for a Fresh Water Fish (1965) made $4.1 million at Christie's New York in 2011.

Ruscha's classic prints, published as multiples, command up to $40,000 apiece.

== Personal life ==
Ruscha is married to Danica Ruscha, née Knego (known as Danna). They met in 1965, wed in 1967, separated in 1972, filed for divorce in 1976, divorced in 1978, and remarried in 1987. The couple has two children, Edward "Eddie" Ruscha Jr., a son, and Sonny Bjornson, a daughter. His son was a musician, who was a member of the bands Medicine and Maids of Gravity. In the late seventies, Ruscha bought land about ten miles from Pioneertown, California; he later built a house there.

During the time he and Danna were apart, Ruscha dated actresses Candy Clark, Samantha Eggar, Diane Keaton, Lauren Hutton, and Michelle Phillips.

According to the Federal Election Commission (FEC), Ruscha donated $12,500 to the presidential campaign of Hillary Clinton in September 2016.

== Legacy ==
In 2011, the J. Paul Getty Museum and the Getty Research Institute acquired over seventy photographs by Ruscha as well as his "Streets of Los Angeles" archive, including thousands of negatives, hundreds of photographic contact sheets, and related documents and ephemera. A portion of the material will go to the Getty as a promised gift from the artist. The "Streets of Los Angeles" archive acquired by the Getty Research Institute begins with the photographic and production material for Ruscha's landmark 1966 book Every Building on the Sunset Strip, and includes the original camera-ready three-panel maquette used for the publication. This ongoing project subsequently evolved into a vast photographic archive that spans over four decades and documents many major Los Angeles thoroughfares, including Santa Monica Boulevard, Melrose Avenue, and Pacific Coast Highway, shot in 1974 and 1975, and more than 25 other Los Angeles streets that Ruscha photographed since 2007. In total, the archive comprises thousands of negatives, hundreds of photographic contact sheets, and related documents and ephemera.

In 2013, the Harry Ransom Center acquired a Ruscha archive comprising five personal journals filled with preliminary sketches and notes; materials related to the making of his artist's book On The Road (2010); notes, photographs, correspondence and contact sheets relating to the creation and publication of his many other artist's books; and materials relating to his short films Miracle (1975) and Premium (1971); his portfolios; and several art commissions. Ruscha himself donated a substantial portion of the archive to the Ransom Center.

== Sources ==
- John Coplans, "New Paintings of Common Objects", Artforum, November, 1962. (Illustrations)
- Nancy Marmer, "Edward Ruscha at Ferus," Artforum, December, 1964.
- Yve-Alain Bois, "Edward Ruscha: Romance with Liquids", Rizzoli Publications, Inc., 1993. ISBN 0-8478-1730-X
- Adam Gopnik, "Ed Ruscha: Paintings", Bowne, Toronto, 2002. ISBN 1-880154-79-X
- Alexandra Schwartz, ed. Leave Any Information at the Signal: Writings, Interviews, Bits, Pages by Ed Ruscha. Cambridge: MIT Press, 2002.
- Mark Francis, "New Drawings", Transcontinental Litho-Acme, Montreal, 2006. ISBN 1-932598-19-7
- David Hickey, "Ed Ruscha: La Mirada Distanciada (The Long View)", Dr. Cantz'sche Druckerei, Ostildern, 2006. ISBN 968-5979-15-4
- Mary Richards, "Ed Ruscha. Modern Artists series", Tate Publishing, 2008. ISBN 978-1-85437-623-7
- Alexandra Schwartz, "Ed Ruscha's Los Angeles", Cambridge: MIT Press, 2010. ISBN 978-0-262-01364-2
- James Ellroy, Ralph Rugoff, Alexandra Schwartz, Bruce Wagner, Ulrich Wilmes, "ED RUSCHA: FIFTY YEARS OF PAINTING," D.A.P./Distributed Art Publishers, 2010. ISBN 978-1-935202-06-6
- Auping Michael, Prince Richard, "ED RUSCHA: ROAD TESTED", Hatje Cantz, 2011. ISBN 978-3-7757-2810-2
- Virginia Heckert, Ed Ruscha and Some Los Angeles Apartments, Los Angeles: Getty Publications, 2013. ISBN 978-1-60606-138-1
- Calvin Tomkins, "Ed Ruscha's L.A.," The New Yorker, July 1, 2013, pp. 48–57.
