= Jim Dine =

American artist (born 1935)

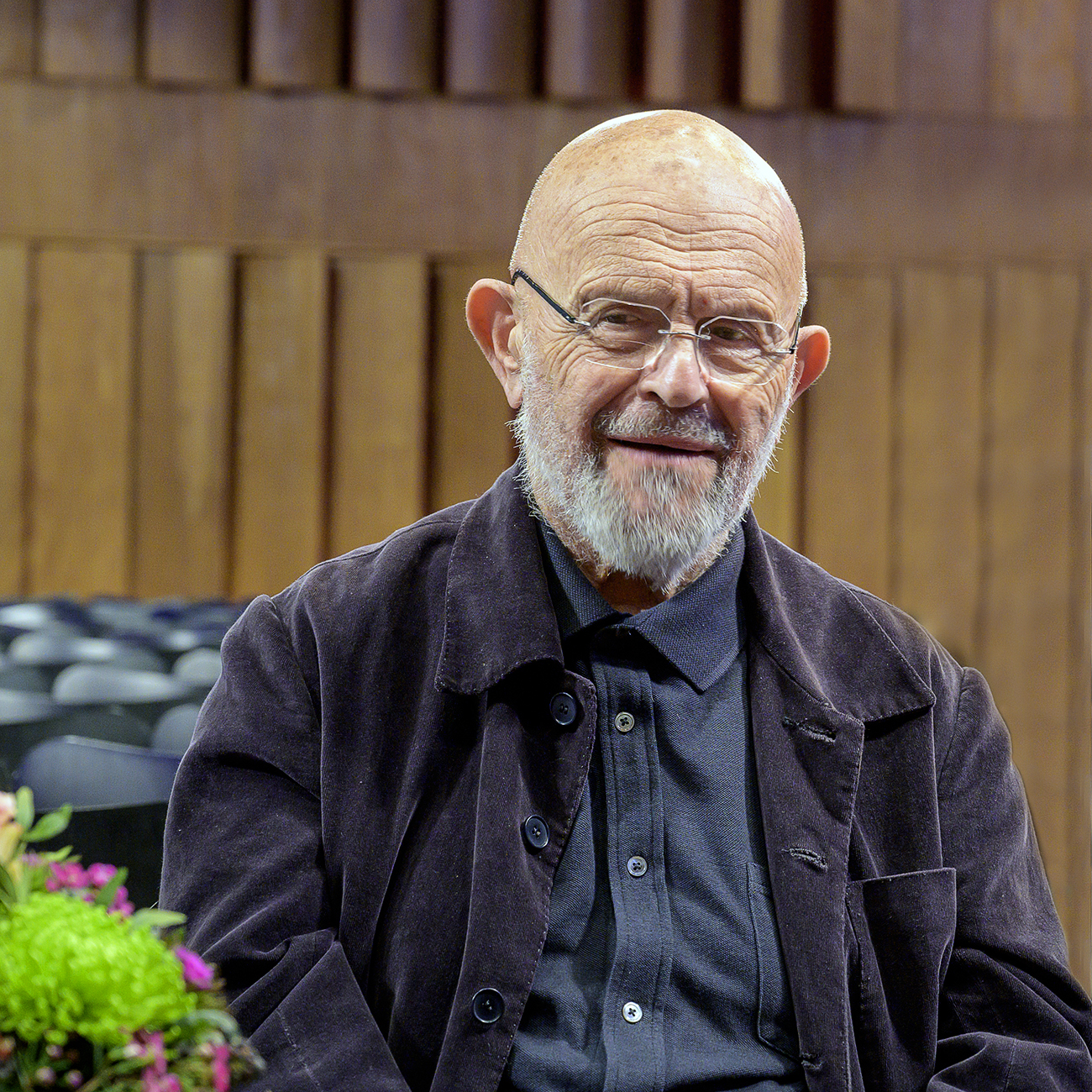
- Dine in 2020
- Born: James Lewis Dine; June 16, 1935 (age 91); Cincinnati, Ohio, U.S.
- Education: Ohio University; University of Cincinnati
- Known for: painting, drawing, sculpture, printmaking, photography, happenings, assemblage, poetry
- Spouse: Nancy Lee Dine

Jim Dine (born June 16, 1935) is an American visual artist. Dine's work includes painting, drawing, printmaking (in many forms including lithographs, etchings, gravure, intaglio, woodcuts, letterpress, and linocuts), sculpture, and photography.

== Education ==
Dine's first formal training took the form of night courses at the Art Academy of Cincinnati, in which he enrolled in 1952 at the age of 16, while attending Walnut Hills High School. In 1954, while still attending evening courses, Dine was inspired by a copy of Paul J. Sachs' Modern Prints and Drawings (1954), particularly by the German Expressionist woodcuts it reproduced, including work by Ernst Ludwig Kirchner (1880–1938), Emil Nolde (1867–1956) and Max Beckmann (1884–1950)—"I was shocked by them" — and began creating woodcuts in the basement of his maternal grandparents, with whom he was then living.

After high school, Dine enrolled at the University of Cincinnati. Under printmaking teacher Donald Roberts (1923–2015) Dine experimented in lithography, etching, intaglio, dry paint and woodcuts. At Roberts' suggestion, Dine subsequently studied for six months with Ture Bengtz (1907–1973) at the School of Fine Arts at the Museum of Fine Arts in Boston, before returning to Ohio University where he graduated with a Bachelor of Fine Arts in 1957 (remaining for an additional year to make paintings and prints, with the permission of the faculty).

== Career ==
Job #1 by Jim Dine, 1962, Honolulu Museum of Art

In 1958 Dine moved to New York, where he taught at the Rhodes School. In the same year he founded the Judson Gallery at the Judson Church in Greenwich Village with Claes Oldenburg and Marcus Ratliff, eventually meeting Allan Kaprow and Bob Whitman: together they became pioneers of happenings and performances, including Dine's The Smiling Workman of 1959. Dine's first exhibition was at the Reuben Gallery, where he also staged the elaborate performance Car Crash (1960), which he describes as "a cacophony of sounds and words spoken by a great white Venus with animal grunts and howls by me." Another important early work was The House (1960), an environment incorporating found objects and street debris, installed at the Judson Gallery.

Dine continued to include everyday items (including personal possessions) in his work, which linked him to Pop Art—an affinity strengthened by his inclusion in the influential 1962 exhibition "New Painting of Common Objects" at the Pasadena Art Museum, curated by Walter Hopps and later cited as the first institutional survey of American Pop Art, including works by Robert Dowd, Joe Goode, Phillip Hefferton, Roy Lichtenstein, Edward Ruscha, Wayne Thiebaud, and Andy Warhol.

== Selected teaching positions ==
- 1965 – guest lecturer at Yale University and artist-in-residence, Oberlin College, Ohio
- 1966 – teaching residency at Cornell University, Ithaca, New York
- 1993–1995 – Salzburg International Summer Academy of Fine Arts, Salzburg
- 1995–1996 – Hochschule der Künste, Berlin

== Selected long-term collaborations ==
- 1962–1976: gallerist Ileana Sonnabend, New York
- 1975–2008: printmaker Aldo Crommelynck, Paris
- 1978–2016: Pace Gallery, New York
- 1979–present: gallerist Alan Cristea, London
- 1983–2018: gallerist Richard Gray, Chicago
- 1983–present: Walla Walla Foundry, Walla Walla, Washington
- 1987–2003: printmaker Kurt Zein, Vienna
- 1991–2016: Spring Street Workshop, New York, with printers including Julia D'Amario, Ruth Lingen, Katherine Kuehn, Bill Hall
- 1998–present: printer and publisher Gerhard Steidl, Göttingen
- 2000–present: gallerist Daniel Templon, Paris-Brussels
- 2003–2018: printmakers Atelier Michael Woolworth, Paris
- 2010–present: foundry Blue Mountain Fine Art, Baker City, Oregon
- 2016–present: printmakers Steindruck Chavanne Pechmann, Apetlon
- 2016–2021: Gray Gallery, Chicago

== Selected permanent collections ==
- Allen Memorial Art Museum, Oberlin
- Art Institute of Chicago, Chicago
- Bowdoin College Museum of Art, Brunswick, ME
- Brooklyn Museum, Brooklyn
- Chazen Museum of Art, Madison, WI
- Cincinnati Art Museum, Cincinnati
- Cleveland Museum of Art, Cleveland
- Fogg Art Museum, Harvard University, Cambridge
- Frederik Meijer Gardens & Sculpture Park, Grand Rapids, MI
- Hirshhorn Museum and Sculpture Garden, Washington, D.C.
- Indianapolis Museum of Art, Indianapolis
- Israel Museum, Jerusalem
- Louisiana Museum of Modern Art, Humelbeak, Denmark
- Metropolitan Museum of Art, New York
- Minneapolis Institute of Arts, Minneapolis
- Museum Folkwang, Essen
- Musée National d'Art Moderne, Centre Pompidou, Paris
- Museum of Contemporary Art, Chicago
- Museum of Fine Arts, Boston
- Museum of Modern Art, New York
- National Gallery of Art, Washington, D.C.
- Palm Springs Art Museum, CA
- Snite Museum of Art, University of Notre Dame
- Solomon R. Guggenheim Museum, New York
- Spencer Museum of Art
- Stedelijk Museum Amsterdam
- Tate Gallery, London
- Whitney Museum of American Art, New York
- Metropolitan Museum of Art, New York
- Stedelijk Museum, Amsterdam
- Tokyo Metropolitan Art Museum, Tokyo
- Yale University Art Gallery, New Haven, CT

== Selected poetry readings ==
- with Ted Berrigan, Arts Lab, Soho, London, 1969
- Poetry Project, with Ted Berrigan, St. Mark's Church, New York, 1970
- Segue Series, with Diana Michener and Vincent Katz, Bowery Poetry Club, New York, 2005
- Tangent reading series with Diana Michener and Vincent Katz, Portland, 2008
- Bastille reading with Marc Marder and Daniel Humair, Paris, 2010
- Bastille reading with Marc Marder, Galerie Eof, Paris, 2014
- Poetry Project, with Dorothea Lasky, St. Mark's Church, New York, 2015
- with Karen Weiser, Dia Art Foundation, New York, 2016
- with Vincent Broqua, University of Sussex, Brighton, 2017
- Hauser & Wirth, New York, 2018
- House of Words (ongoing)
- Günter Grass Archive, Göttingen, 2015
- with Marc Marder, Galerie Eof, Paris, 2015
- with Marc Marder, Poetry Foundation, Chicago, 2016
- Ecrivains en bord de mer, La Baule, 2017
- with Daniele Roccato and Fabrizio Ottaviucci, Chiesa dei Santi Luca e Martina, Rome, 2017
- In Vivo, with Daniele Roccato and Fabrizio Ottaviucci, Centre Georges Pompidou, Paris, 2018
