= Wayne Thiebaud =

American painter (1920–2021)

- Born: Morton Wayne Thiebaud; November 15, 1920; Mesa, Arizona, U.S.
- Died: December 25, 2021 (aged 101); Sacramento, California, U.S.
- Education: Sacramento State College; San Jose State College; Sacramento State
- Known for: Painting, printmaking
- Movement: Pop Art, New Realism, Bay Area Figurative Movement
- Children: 3, including Paul and Twinka
- Awards: National Medal of Arts (1994)

Wayne Thiebaud (/ˈtiːboʊ/ TEE-boh; born Morton Wayne Thiebaud; November 15, 1920 – December 25, 2021) was an American painter known for his colorful works depicting commonplace objects—pies, cakes, lipsticks, paint cans, ice cream cones, pastries, and hot dogs—as well as for his landscapes and figure paintings. Thiebaud is regarded as one of the United States' most beloved and recognizable artists. Thiebaud is associated with the pop art movement because of his interest in objects of mass culture, though he slightly predated the classic pop artists, producing his early works of this style in the fifties and sixties. Thiebaud used heavy pigment and exaggerated colors to depict his subjects, his work almost always including the well-defined shadows characteristic of advertisements.

== Early life ==
Thiebaud was born to Alice Eugenia (Le Baron) and Morton Thiebaud in Mesa, Arizona. They moved a year later to southern California where the family lived for most of Thiebaud's childhood until he graduated from secondary school in Long Beach, California. Thiebaud and his family were members of the Church of Jesus Christ of Latter-day Saints, and his father was a bishop in the church when Thiebaud was a teenager. Morton was also a Ford mechanic, foreman at Gold Medal Creamery, traffic safety supervisor, and real estate agent.

One summer during his first school years, he apprenticed at Walt Disney Studios drawing "in-betweens" of Goofy, Pinocchio, and Jiminy Cricket at a rate of $14 a week. The next summer, he studied at the Frank Wiggins Trade School in Los Angeles. From 1938 to 1949, he worked as a cartoonist and designer in California and New York City. He was an artist in the First Motion Picture Unit of the United States Army Air Forces from 1942 to 1945.

In 1949, he enrolled at San Jose State College (now San José State University) before transferring to Sacramento State College (now California State University, Sacramento), where he earned a bachelor's degree in 1951 and a master's degree in 1952.

== Career ==
Thiebaud subsequently began teaching at Sacramento City College. In 1960, he became assistant professor at the University of California, Davis, where he taught for 42 years and influenced numerous art and design students. He held a Professor Emeritus title there up until his death in late 2021. He retired from UC Davis in 1990, but continued to teach on an unpaid basis until 2002.

On a leave of absence during 1956–57, he spent time in New York City, where he became friends with Elaine and Willem de Kooning and Franz Kline, and was much influenced by these abstractionists as well as by proto-pop artists Robert Rauschenberg and Jasper Johns. During this time, he began a series of very small paintings based on images of food displayed in windows, and he focused on their basic shapes.

Returning to California, he pursued this subject matter and style, isolating triangles, circles, squares, etc. He also co-founded the Artists Cooperative Gallery, now Artists Contemporary Gallery, and other cooperatives including Pond Farm, having been exposed to the concept of cooperatives in New York.

In 1960, he had his first solo show in San Francisco at the San Francisco Museum of Modern Art, and shows in New York City at the Staempfli and Tanager galleries. These shows received little notice, but two years later, a 1962 Sidney Janis Gallery exhibition in New York officially launched Pop Art, bringing Thiebaud national recognition, although he disclaimed being anything other than a painter of illusionistic form.

In 1961, Thiebaud met and became friends with art dealer Allan Stone (1932–2006), the man who gave him his first "break." Stone was Thiebaud's dealer until Stone's death in 2006. Stone said of Thiebaud "I have had the pleasure of friendship with a complex and talented man, a terrific teacher and cook, the best raconteur in the west with a spin serve, and a great painter whose magical touch is exceeded only by his genuine modesty and humility. Thiebaud's dedication to painting and his pursuit of excellence inspire all who are lucky enough to come in contact with him. He is a very special man." After Stone's death, Thiebaud's son Paul Thiebaud (1960–2010) took over as his dealer. Paul Thiebaud was a successful art dealer in his own right and had eponymous galleries in Manhattan and San Francisco; he died June 19, 2010.

In 1962, Thiebaud's work was included, along with Roy Lichtenstein, Andy Warhol, Jim Dine, Phillip Hefferton, Joe Goode, Edward Ruscha, and Robert Dowd, in the historically important and ground-breaking "New Painting of Common Objects," curated by Walter Hopps at the Pasadena Art Museum (now the Norton Simon Museum at Pasadena). This exhibition is considered to have been one of the first Pop Art exhibitions in the United States. These painters were part of a new movement, in a time of social unrest, which shocked the United States and the art world.

In 1963, he turned increasingly to figure painting: wooden and rigid, with each detail sharply emphasized. In 1964, he made his first prints at Crown Point Press, and continued to make prints throughout his career. In 1967, his work was shown at the Biennale Internationale.

In 1993, Thiebaud created Coastline, an image used for a California specialty license plate. Issued beginning in 1994, the plate generates revenue for the California Arts Council, supporting arts education and community programs statewide. The design, featuring stylized palm trees and a coastal landscape, has become one of the most recognizable public artworks in California.

== Personal life ==
Thiebaud was married twice. With his first wife, Patricia Patterson, he had two children, one of whom is the model and writer Twinka Thiebaud. With his second wife, Betty Jean Carr, he had a son, Paul LeBaron Thiebaud, who became an art dealer. His granddaughter, Colette Thiebaud, works in the art market at Christie’s and is involved in arts education initiatives.

He died at his residence in Sacramento, California, on Christmas Day 2021, at age 101.

== Work ==
Three Machines, 1963, de Young Museum, San Francisco

Thiebaud is well known for his paintings of production line objects found in diners and cafeterias, such as pies and pastries. As a young man in Long Beach, he worked at a cafe named Mile High and Red Hot, where "Mile High" was ice cream and "Red Hot" was a hot dog.

He was associated with the Pop art painters because of his interest in objects of mass culture; however, his works, executed during the 1950s and 1960s, slightly predate the works of the classic pop artists, suggesting that Thiebaud may have had an influence on the movement. Thiebaud employed heavy pigment and exaggerated colors to depict his subjects, and the well-defined shadows characteristic of advertisements are almost always included in his work. Thiebaud was averse to labels such as "fine art" versus "commercial art" and described himself as "just an old-fashioned painter". He disliked Andy Warhol's "flat" and "mechanical" paintings and did not consider himself a pop artist.

In addition to pastries, Thiebaud painted characters such as Mickey Mouse as well as landscapes, streetscapes, and cityscapes, which were influenced by the work of Richard Diebenkorn. His paintings such as Sunset Streets (1985) and Flatland River (1997) are noted for their hyper realism, and have been compared to Edward Hopper's work, another artist who was fascinated with mundane scenes from everyday American life.

=== Notable works ===
- 1961 Drink Syrups
- 1961 Pies, Pies, Pies
- 1962 Around the Cake
- 1962 Bakery Counter
- 1962 Confections
- 1962 Candy Machine
- 1963 Display Cakes
- 1963 Cakes
- 1963 Girl with Ice Cream Cone
- 1963 Man with Cheddar
- 1964 Three Strawberry Shakes
- 1964 Eight Lipsticks
- 1964 Man Sitting – Back View
- 1964 Lemon Cake
- 1966 Powder With Puff
- 1967 Blue Hill
- 1968 Coloma Ridge
- 1968 Sandwich
- 1970 Seven Suckers
- 1971 Four Cupcakes
- 1975 Shoe Rows
- 1976 Potrero Hill
- 1977 24th Street Intersection
- 1981 Hill Street (Day City)
- 1987 Two Paint Cans
- 1991 The Three Cows
- 1992 Thirteen Books
- 1993 Apartment View
- 1993 Coastline (California Arts Council specialty license plate)
- 1996 Farm Channel
- 1999 Reservoir
- 2000 Clown Cones
- 2002 Jolly Cones (Ice Cream Cones)
- 2008 Three Ice cream Cones
- 2010 The Google 12th Birthday Cake
- 2010 Tulip Sundae

== Collections and exhibitions ==
Thiebaud's works are in permanent collections at the Los Angeles County Museum of Art, the Crocker Art Museum, and the Whitney Museum of American Art. The Hirshhorn Museum and Sculpture Garden, the Albright-Knox Art Gallery, the San Francisco Museum of Modern Art, the Albrecht-Kemper Museum of Art, and the Phoenix Art Museum have also held works by the artist. Exhibitions featuring Thiebaud include a 2001 retrospective at the Whitney Museum, a 2012 retrospective at Acquavella Galleries, a 2017 major retrospective at White Cube in London, a 2021 retrospective at the Toledo Museum of Art.

The Crocker has hosted a Thiebaud exhibition every decade since 1951, including "Wayne Thiebaud 100" to honor the artist's 100th birthday in 2020.

In 2025, the San Francisco Legion of Honor, exhibited his work in "Wayne Thiebaud: Art Comes From Art." In the same year, the Courtauld Gallery, London, staged his first ever UK museum show, American Still Life.

== Recognition ==
In 1987, Thiebaud was awarded the Golden Plate Award of the American Academy of Achievement. On October 14, 1994, Thiebaud was presented with the National Medal of Arts by President Clinton. In 2009, he was honored by California Lawyers for the Arts with its Artistic License Award at its annual gala celebration. He also received the Lifetime Achievement Award for Art from the American Academy of Design in 2001. Thiebaud was inducted into the California Hall of Fame in 2010 at the California Museum, Sacramento, and in 2013, he was honored with the California Art Award in recognition of his part in raising the prominence of California art around the world.

== Auction records ==
In November 2019, Sotheby's $8.46 million sale of Thiebaud's 2011 painting Encased Cakes set an auction record for the artist. This record was broken in July 2020, when his 1962 painting Four Pinball Machines sold for $19.135 million in New York City at a Christie's global live auction event.

== Influences ==
One of Thiebaud's students from Sacramento City College was the artist Fritz Scholder (1937–2005), who went on to become a major influence in the direction of American Indian art through his instruction at the Institute of American Indian Arts in Santa Fe, New Mexico, (1964–1969). The painter Mel Ramos (1935–2018), considered Thiebaud his mentor. Among his pupils were the painters Faith Bromberg, Vonn Cummings Sumner, and Christopher Brown.

Sharon Core is a photographer known for her photographic interpretations of Thiebaud's works.

== Books ==
- Nash, Steven A.; Wayne Thiebaud Paintings: A Retrospective (Thames Hudson, 2000) ISBN 0500092923
- Baker, Kenneth; Fox Weber, Nicholas; Wayne Thiebaud (Rizzoli, 2022) ISBN 0847871622
- Rubin, Susan; Life and Art of Wayne Thiebaud (Chronicle Press, 2008) ISBN 0811851680
- Shields, Scott; Wayne Thiebaud 100: Paintings, Prints, and Drawings (Pomegranate, 2020) ISBN 1087501172
- Thiebaud, Wayne; Williams, LG; Cooper, Gene; Wayne Thiebaud Lectures on Art and Drawing (PCP Press, 2018) ISBN 1985865432
