= List of printmakers =

Key to Techniques: En = Engraver (includes Drypoint), Et = Etcher, Wo = Woodcut, Me = Mezzotint, Mo = Monotype, Aq = Aquatint, Li = Lithography, We = Wood engraving, Sc = Screen-printing, St = Stipple, Di = digital.

== Old master print period – c. 1800 ==
=== 15th century ===
==== Northern ====
- Master of the Playing Cards En
- Master ES En
- Master of the Housebook En
- Martin Schongauer En
- Master I. A. M. of Zwolle En
- Master of the Weibermacht En
- Master L. Cz. En
- Israhel van Meckenem En
- Mair von Landshut, En, Wo
- Master MZ, En
- Master W with the Key En
- Master W. B. En
- Michael Wolgemut Wo
- Erhard Reuwich Wo

==== Italian ====
- Baccio Baldini En
- Jacopo de' Barbari En, Wo
- Maso Finiguerra En, It
- Andrea Mantegna En
- Masters of the Mantegna Tarocchi En
- Antonio del Pollaiuolo En

=== 16th century Renaissance / mannerist ===
==== Austrian ====
- Wenzel Jamnitzer Et
- Wolf Huber Wo

==== Dutch and Flemish ====
- Johann Theodor de Bry En (later in Germany, also publisher)
- Jan Van Calcar Wo
- Hieronymus Cock En, Et, Publisher
- Hans Collaert En, son of Adriaen
- Cornelis Cort En
- Philippe Galle En, Publisher, and his heirs, including Adriaen Collaert.
- Hendrik Goltzius En, Et
- Joris Hoefnagel En
- Lucas van Leyden En, Wo
- Sadeler family - Aegidius Sadeler En (and his many relations)
- Maerten de Vos En
- Van de Passe family En (or "de Passe")
- Wierix family En

==== French ====
- Jean Duvet En

==== German ====
- Heinrich Aldegrever En, Wo
- Albrecht Altdorfer Et, Wo, En
- Hans Baldung Wo, Et
- Bartel Beham En
- Hans Sebald Beham En, Wo
- Hans Burgkmair Wo (invented the chiaroscuro woodcut)
- Lucas Cranach the Elder Wo
- Albrecht Dürer Eng, Et, Wo
- Hans Holbein the Younger Wo
- Daniel Hopfer Et (invented etching)
- The Little Masters, mostly En
- Georg Pencz En
- Hieronymus Andreae Wo cutter
- Jacob Faber Wo and metalcut cutter
- Jost de Negker Wo cutter

==== Italian ====
- Jacopo de' Barbari En
- Federico Barocci Et
- Giovanni Jacopo Caraglio En
- Agostino Carracci En, Et
- Annibale Carracci Et, En
- Ludovico Carracci Et
- Giulio Campagnola En (invented stipple engraving)
- Domenico Campagnola En, Wo
- Ugo da Carpi En, Wo
- Battista Franco Veneziano (or Giovanni Battista Franco) Et
- Giorgio Ghisi En
- Parmigianino Et, Wo
- Martino Rota En, Et (born Dalmatia)
- Marcantonio Raimondi En
- Ventura Salimbeni Et
- Antonio Tempesta Et, En
- Agostino Veneziano En

==== Swiss ====
- Jost Amman Wo, En (mainly book illustrations)
- Urs Graf Et, Wo (invented white-line woodcut)

=== 17th century ===
==== British ====
- Francis Barlow (artist) Et

==== Dutch and Flemish ====
- Martin Baes En
- Ferdinand Bol Et
- Hans Collaert En
- Karel Dujardin Et
- Anthony van Dyck Et
- Gerard Edelinck Et, En
- Philip Fruytiers Et
- Jan Fyt Et
- Jacob de Gheyn II En
- Samuel van Hoogstraten Et
- Gerrit Lambrechts En
- Adriaen van Ostade Et
- Rembrandt Harmenszoon van Rijn Et, En
- Jacob Isaakszoon van Ruisdael Et
- Hercules Seghers Et, En, Aq (with hand-painting etc.)
- Adriaen van de Velde Et
- Lucas Vorsterman En (reproductive, with Rubens etc.)

==== French ====
- Gérard Audran En (and at least four other Audrans)
- Jacques Bellange Et
- Abraham Bosse Et, En
- Jacques Callot Et
- François Chauveau, En
- Claude Lefèbvre En
- Claude Mellan En
- Robert Nanteuil En
- Gilles Rousselet, En, Et

==== German ====
- Ludwig von Siegen Me, En (invented Mezzotint)

==== Italian ====
- Sisto Badalocchio En
- Pietro Santi Bartoli En (reproductive)
- Stefano della Bella Et
- Remigio Cantagallina Et
- Simone Cantarini Et
- Francesco Carracci En (reproductive)
- Giovanni Benedetto Castiglione Et, Mo (invented monotyping)
- Luca Giordano Et
- Filippo Napoletano Et
- Simone da Pesaro — see Simone Cantarini
- Bernardino Poccetti Et
- Salvator Rosa Et
- Israel Silvestre Et (and printseller)
- Valerio Spada Et, En
- Pietro Testa Et, En

==== Spanish ====
- Jusepe de Ribera Et (worked in Naples)

==== Other ====
- Wenceslaus Hollar Et, En (Czech, worked in Germany and London)
- Matthäus Merian En, Et (Swiss, mainly views, plans)

=== 18th century ===
==== British ====
- Samuel Alken Et, Aq (caricatures)
- William Austin Et (caricatures)
- Francis Barlow (artist) Et
- George Bickham the Younger Et, En (caricatures)
- William Blake En, Et (Relief etching, which he invented)
- Charles Bretherton Et (caricatures)
- James Bretherton Et (caricatures)
- Thomas Cheesman Et, St, Me, Aq (portraits)
- Joseph Collyer En (reproductive)
- Isaac Cruikshank Et, Aq (caricatures)
- Robert Cruikshank Et, en, Aq (caricatures)
- Richard Dighton Et, Aq (caricatures)
- William Dickinson Et (caricatures)
- William Elmes Et (caricatures)
- Richard Earlom Me (reproductive)
- Thomas Gainsborough Et, Aq (landscapes)
- Daniel Gardner Et, En, Me (portraits)
- James Gilray Et, En, Me, Aq, St (caricatures)
- Thomas Girtin Et (landscapes)
- Havell family En, Li, Et, Aq
- William Hogarth En
- Samuel Howitt Et, Aq (caricatures)
- John Kay Et, (caricatures)
- John Hamilton Mortimer Et (caricatures)
- Richard Newton Et, Aq (caricatures)
- Piercy Roberts Et, En, Me (caricatures)
- Thomas Rowlandson Et, Aq (caricatures)
- Paul Sandby Et (landscapes)
- F.Sansom Et (caricatures)
- Robert Sayers Et (caricatures)
- John Keyse Sherwin Et, En, Me (portraits)
- John Raphael Smith Et
- Peltro William Tomkins Et, En, Me (portraits, landscapes)
- Francis Wheatley (painter) Et
- Charles Williams Et (caricatures)

==== French ====
- Louis Baltard En (mainly architectural)
- Jean-Honoré Fragonard Et
- Jean-Baptiste Le Prince Et, En, Aq
- Bernard Picart
- Marie-Anne Rousselet, En
- Claude-Henri Watelet Et

==== German ====
- Daniel Chodowiecki Et
- Johann Jakob Haid En, Me

==== Italian ====
- Francesco Bartolozzi St, Et, En (invented colour stipple technique), (mostly worked in London, mostly reproductive)
- Bernardo Bellotto Et (worked mostly in Germany and Poland)
- Mariano Bovi En (mostly worked in London, mostly reproductive)
- Giovanni Domenico Campiglia En, Et (reproductive)
- Giovanni Antonio Canal (known as Canaletto) Et
- Giovanni Battista Cipriani Et (mostly worked in London, mostly reproductive)
- Pietro Fontana (engraver) En
- Pietro Gaspari Et
- Alessandro Longhi En
- Bartolomeo Nerici En
- Giovanni Battista Piranesi Et
- Luigi Schiavonetti En, Et St (reproductive)
- Alessandro Specchi Et
- Giovanni Battista Tiepolo Et
- Giovanni Domenico Tiepolo Et

==== Spanish ====
- Francisco Goya Et, Aq

==== Other ====
- Johann Ludwig Aberli Et, En (Swiss)
- Adam Bartsch Et, En (Austrian)
- Johan Frederik Clemens Et (Danish)
- Ulrika Pasch et (Swedish)
- Anna Maria Thelott et (Swedish)
- Alexey Zubov Et (Russian)

== 19th century ==
Key to Techniques: En = Engraver (includes Drypoint), Et = Etcher, Wo = Woodcut, Me = Mezzotint, Mo = Monotype, Aq = Aquatint, Li = Lithography, We = Wood engraving, Sc = Screen-printing, St = Stipple, Di = digital

=== The Americas ===
==== United States of America ====
- Mary Cassatt Et, Aq, Li
- Nathaniel Currier Li (Publisher)
- F. O. C. Darley Li
- Henry Farrer Et
- Ellen Day Hale Li
- Winslow Homer En
- James Merritt Ives (Publisher)
- Louis Maurer Li (for Currier & Ives)
- Aaron Peasley En
- Maurice Prendergast Mo
- John Sartain Me
- James McNeill Whistler En, Et, Li
- Edwin Whitefield Li
- John Caspar Wild Li (Swiss-born)
- Donald Shaw MacLaughlan En, Et (Canadian-American)

==== Mexico ====
- José Guadalupe Posada En, We

=== Europe ===
==== Austrian ====
- Josef Kriehuber Li
- Bernhard Wachtl Li

==== Dutch and Belgian ====
- James Ensor Et
- Johan Jongkind
- Jan August Hendrik Leys Et
- Félicien Rops Et, Aq

==== British ====
- Lawrence Alma-Tadema Et (Dutch-born)
- Henry Alken Et, Aq
- Thomas Lewis Atkinson En (Reproductive)
- Thomas Barker of Bath Li
- Edward Calvert (painter) We, En
- David Young Cameron Et
- John Constable Me (collaboratively)
- John Doyle Li (caricatures)
- John Sell Cotman Et
- William Ensom En
- Francis Seymour Haden Et
- William Heath Et, Aq (caricatures)
- John Douglas Miller En (Reproductive)
- Samuel Palmer Et, En, Mo
- John Skinner Prout Li (also period in Australia)
- William Bell Scott En, Et, Me
- Walter Sickert Et
- William Strang En, Et, Me, Li, Wo, We
- J. M. W. Turner Et, Me

==== French ====
- Firmin Bouisset Li
- Théodore Chassériau Et
- Jules Chéret Li
- Jean-Baptiste-Camille Corot Et
- Honoré Daumier Li, Et
- Edgar Degas Et, Li, Mo (often added to by hand)
- Eugène Delacroix Li
- Achille Devéria Li
- Gustave Doré We
- Henri Fantin-Latour Li
- Paul Gavarni Li
- Théodore Géricault Li
- Armand Guillaumin Li
- Alphonse Legros Et
- Louis-François, Baron Lejeune Li
- Charles Meryon Et
- Denis Auguste Marie Raffet Li
- Paul Adolphe Rajon Et
- Odilon Redon Et, Li
- Auguste Rodin Drypoint, Li
- Théophile Steinlen Li
- Henri de Toulouse-Lautrec Li
- James Tissot Et, Wo, En
- Adolphe Willette Et

==== German ====
- Lovis Corinth En, Et, Li, Wo etc.
- Max Liebermann Et, Li
- Adolph Menzel Et, Li
- Johann Friedrich Overbeck Et
- Ferdinand Piloty Li
- Moritz Retzsch Et

==== Italian ====
- Giovanni Fattori Et
- Telemaco Signorini Et

==== Swiss ====
- Samuel Amsler En (reproductive)
- John Bachmann Li
- Théophile Steinlen Li
- Félix Vallotton Wo

Swedish

- Lea Ahlborn
- Anders Zorn Et

=== Australia ===
- John Eyre En (Australian)
- Richard Jarman En (Australian)

Others

- Andrey Yefimovich Martynov Et, Li (Russian)

== 20th century, 1900 to c. 1960 ==
=== The Americas ===
==== United States of America ====
- George Adomeit Li (and printer)
- Grace Albee Wo, Weh
- Anni Albers Li, Sc
- Valenti Angelo En, Wo (Linocut)
- Garo Antreasian Li
- Martin Barooshian En, Et, Wo, Mo, Aq, Li, We
- Leonard Baskin
- George Bellows Li
- Leon Bibel
- Robert Blackburn (artist) Li
- George Elbert Burr Et
- Minna Citron
- Amelia R. Coats Et
- Eleanor Coen Li
- Max Arthur Cohn Sc
- Alphaeus Philemon Cole Et, En
- Adolf Dehn Li
- Mabel Dwight, Li
- Constance Edith Fowler We
- Hugo Gellert Li, Sc
- Wedo Georgetti Et, Li
- Harry Gottlieb, Sc, Li
- Blanche Grambs, Li, Et
- William Cropper Li
- Thomas Handforth Et
- Riva Helfond Li, We, Et,
- Edward Hopper Et
- Jacques Hnizdovsky Wo, Li, Et
- Max Kahn Li, Wo
- Jacob Kainen Et
- Rockwell Kent Li, Wo
- Albert Kotin
- Doris Emrick Lee
- Louis Lozowick Li
- Nan Lurie Li
- Robert Motherwell Et, Li
- Elizabeth Olds Sc, We, Li
- Gen Paul
- Joseph Pennell Et
- Ernest A. Pickup (1887-1970) We
- Horatio Nelson Poole (1884–1949)
- Anton Refregier We, Li, Sc
- Mark Rothko
- Louis Schanker Et, Wo
- Harry Shoulberg Sc
- Maybelle Stamper, Li
- Harry Sternberg Sc, We, Et
- Hannah Tompkins Wo
- John French Sloan Et
- Stow Wengenroth Li

==== Latin American ====
- Carlos Alvarado Lang En, We, Li (Mexico)
- Roberto Matta Et, Li (Chile)

=== Europe ===
==== British ====
- Salomon van Abbé Et
- Anna Airy Et
- Edmund Blampied En, Li, Et
- Frank Brangwyn Et, Wo, Li
- Muirhead Bone Et, Li
- Gerald Brockhurst Et, En
- Augustus John Et
- Ernest Stephen Lumsden Et
- Helena Markson Et, Li
- John Piper Et, Li
- Robert Tavener Li, Sc
- Sidney Tushingham Et

==== Dutch and Belgian ====
- Jean De Bast En (mostly for stamps)
- René Carcan
- M. C. Escher Wo, Li, Me
- Frans Masereel Wo
- Samuel Jessurun de Mesquita Wo
- Fernand Verhaegen Et

==== French ====
- Pierre Bonnard Li
- Pierre Brissaud En (Pochoir)
- Bernard Buffet Et, Li
- Paul Gauguin Wo
- Paul César Helleu En (Drypoint)
- Marie Laurencin Li
- Maximilien Luce Li
- Aristide Maillol Wo
- Malo-Renault En (Drypoint), Et, Aq, We
- Nori Malo-Renault Et; Aq
- André Masson Et, Li
- Henri Matisse Li, We
- Georges Rouault Et, Li
- Jacques Villon Et
- Édouard Vuillard Li
- Maurice de Vlaminck Li
- Victor Vasarely Et, Li

==== German ====
- Max Beckmann Wo, Et
- Otto Dix Et
- Johnny Friedlaender, Et, Aq
- Erich Heckel Wo, Et, Li
- Ernst Ludwig Kirchner Wo, Li, Et
- Käthe Kollwitz Wo, Et
- Franz Marc Wo, Li
- Otto Mueller Wo, Et, Li
- Emil Nolde Wo, Et, Li Hectographs
- Max Pechstein Wo, Et, Li
- Karl Schmidt-Rottluff Wo, Et, Li

==== Greek ====
- Nikolaos Ventouras Wo, Et, Aq, Li

==== Swedish ====
- Torsten Billman Wo
- Olga Herlin En
- Sven Ljungberg Li, Wo
- Birgit Skiöld Et, Li

==== Hungarian ====
- Vilmos Aba-Novák Et
- Károly Patkó Et
- István Szőnyi Et

==== Spanish ====
- Salvador Dalí Et, Li
- Pablo Picasso Et, Li
- Antonio Saura Et, Li
- Antoni Tàpies Et, Li

==== Italian ====
- Alberto Burri Et, Li
- Lucio Fontana Et, Li
- Marino Marini Et, Li
- Giorgio Morandi Et

==== Other European ====
- Zofia Albinowska-Minkiewiczowa (Polish)
- Marie Čermínová (known as Toyen) Li (Czech)
- Józef Hecht En, Et, Wo (Polish)
- Peter Ilsted Me, Et, En, Aq (Danish)
- Wassily Kandinsky Et, Li, Wo (Russian)
- George Malakov En (Ukrainian)
- Edvard Munch Wo, Et, Li (Norwegian)
- Emil Orlík Et (Czech)
- Tavík František Šimon Et, Wo, Aq (Czech)
- Halvard Storm Et, (Norwegian)
- Fernand Verhaegen Et (Belgian)

==== Australasian ====
- Norman Lindsay Et, En, Me, Aq, St, Wo
- Sidney Nolan
- Margaret Preston Et, Wo, Mo (Stencil cuts)
- H. van Raalte Et, Aq
- Arthur Boyd Et Aq
- Grahame King Li Et Aq
- Franz Kempf Et
- Frank Hinder Li

=== Asia and Africa ===
- Tsuguharu Foujita Li, Et

==== Indian ====
- Haren Das We
- Somnath Hore We, Et
- Abdul Kadar Khatri (1961 - 2019) Indian Master Craftsman
- K. G. Subramanyan Gu
- Jayant Parikh Gu

== Active and contemporary, from c. 1960 to present ==
=== The Americas ===
==== United States of America ====
- Above (artist)
- Articulate Ink (collective, founding members Amber Dalton, Caitlin Mullan, and Michelle Brownridge, later joined by Karli Jessup)
- Katie Baldwin Sc
- Martin Barooshian En, Et, Wo, Mo, Aq, Li, We
- Earl W. Bascom Et, Li, Wo
- Leonard Baskin
- Robert Blackburn Li, Wo
- Jack Boul Mo
- Kathan Brown
- Elizabeth Catlett Wo (Linocut)
- Enrique Chagoya Et, En, Li, Di
- Susan Crile
- Joseph Craig English Sc
- Donald Farnsworth
- Sam Francis Li, Et
- Antonio Frasconi Wo, Li
- Joseph Goldyne
- Nancy Graves Li
- Tatyana Grosman
- Philip Guston Li
- Jane Hammond Li, Si
- Mary Henry (artist)
- Jacques Hnizdovsky Wo, Li, Et
- Yvonne Jacquette Wo
- Jasper Johns Et, Li
- Jeff Koons
- Tomas Lasansky
- Ruth Leaf Et, Wo
- Larry Francis Lebby
- Roy Lichtenstein Li, Sc
- Evan Lindquist
- M. Bernard Loates We, Me, Li, Sc, St, Di
- Jack McLarty Li, Wo, We, Sc, Et
- Byron McKeeby Li
- Barry Moser
- Malcolm H Myers En, Et, Wo, Mo, Aq, LI, We
- Virginia A. Myers Et, En
- Miriam Mörsel Nathan Mo
- Antero Olin
- Lothar Osterburg
- Michael Parkes Li
- Steve Poleskie Sc
- Andrew Raftery En
- Robert Rauschenberg Li, Sc
- Bob Schneider
- Lynn Shaler Et, Aq
- Claus Sievert, Et
- Julian Stanczak
- Frank Stella Li, Wo
- Brian Shure, Li, Et, Wo
- Nathaniel Stern En
- Lou Stovall
- John August Swanson Li, St, Et
- Jonathan Talbot Et
- Arthur Thrall
- Barbara Tisserat Li
- Janet E. Turner En, Aq, Li
- Andy Warhol Sc
- Carol Wax Wo
- June Wayne
- Anna Wong (artist)

==== Canadian ====
- Alashua Aningmiuq
- Kenojuak Ashevak
- Siasi Atitu
- Tivi Etok
- Kiakshuk
- Victoria Mamnguqsualuk Sc
- Jessie Oonark
- Lucy Qinnuayuak

==== Argentina ====
- Mauricio Lasansky Et, Aq, En (Argentinian)

=== Europe ===
==== British ====
- Norman Ackroyd Et
- Charles W. Bartlett
- Peter Blake Sc
- Patrick Caulfield
- Lucian Freud Et
- Elisabeth Frink Li
- Richard Hamilton (artist) Sc etc.
- Stanley William Hayter Et, En
- Damien Hirst And, Li, Wo, Sc, Di
- David Hockney Li, Et
- Howard Hodgkin mostly Et (hand-painted)
- Ron Kitaj Sc, Li (American-born)
- Bernard Meninsky
- Eduardo Paolozzi Sc, Li
- Paula Rego Et, Li
- Daphne Reynolds (artist)
- Elaine Shemilt
- Richard Spare En, Et, Mo, Aq

==== Czech ====
- Marian Korn

==== Dutch and Flemish ====
- Han Hoogerbrugge
- Philip Kouwen Et
- Fra Paalman Aq, Et, Mo, Sc
- Jan Montyn Et

==== German ====
- Joseph Beuys
- Johnny Friedlaender Aq
- Ekkeland Götze Sc
- Catrin G Grosse Wo
- Horst Janssen Wo, Et, Li, We
- Rolf Nesch
- Günter Fruhtrunk Li, Sc
- Klaus Staeck
- Wolf Vostell

==== Swedish ====
- Torsten Billman Wo
- Sven Ljungberg Li, Wo

==== Hungarian ====
- Jenő Barcsay Et
- Miklós Borsos Et
- Líviusz Gyulai Et, Li, Wo
- Istvan Horkay
- Béla Kondor Et, Wo, Li, Mo
- János Kass Et, Wo
- Endre Szász Et, Sc

==== Russian ====
- Anatoli Lvovich Kaplan Li

==== Other European ====
- Sergei Balenok Et (Belerus)
- Einar Hákonarson (Iceland)
- Cezary Paszkowski Et, Wo, Aq, Di (Poland)
- Ihor Podolchak (Ukrainian)

Australasian

- Susan Dorothea White
- Mary Macqueen Li

=== Asia ===
Indian

- Mohammed Yusuf Khatri
- Krishna Reddy Et
- K. G. Subramanyan Li
- Anupam Sud Et
- Laxma Goud Et
- Jyoti Bhatt Et
- Rajesh Pullarwar

Other Middle East, Asia

- Avigdor Arikha Et, Aq, Li (born Romania, Israeli living in France)
- Mina Nouri (Iranian)
- Judy Ongg Wo (born Taiwan, works Japan)
- Manuel Rodriguez Sr. (Filipino)

=== Australia and New Zealand ===
Australian

- Adam Cullen Et
- Tony Ameneiro Li, Et, Mo, Wo
- Rick Amor Et, Li, Wo
- Charles Blackman Li, Et
- David Boyd
- James Gleeson Et, Li
- Rona Green Wo
- Nicholas Harding Et, Li
- Robert Jacks Et, Li
- Alun Leach-Jones Et, Li, Wo
- John Olsen Et, Li
- Geoffrey Ricardo Et, Li
- William Robinson Et, Li
- Mark Rowden Et, En, Aq, We
- Wendy Sharpe Et
- Heather Shimmen Wo
- Salvatore Zofrea Wo
- Susan Dorothea White

New Zealand

- Vanessa Wairata Edwards
- Stanley Palmer
- Marilyn Webb

== See also ==
- Master printmaker
- Timeline of 20th century printmaking in America
