= Lambrechts =

Lambrechts is a Dutch patronymic surname (Lambrecht's son). It is most common in Belgium (6207 people in 2008). Variant forms are Lambrecht, Lambregts, Lambrichs, Lambrichts and Lamprecht. In the 18th century, the name was introduced in Norway. People with this surname include:

- Annie Lambrechts (born c.1950), Belgian roller skate racer
- Burger Lambrechts (born 1973), South African shot putter
- Charles Lambrechts (1753–1825), Belgian-born Minister of Justice of France during the French Revolution
- Cor Lambregts (born 1958), Dutch long-distance runner
- Diether Lambrechts (born 1976), Belgian geneticist
- Esther Lambrechts (1919–2011), Flemish singer known as La Esterella
- Finn Lambrechts (1900–1956), Norwegian military officer
- Flor Lambrechts (1910–1990), Belgian football forward
- Frits Lambrechts (born 1937), Dutch actor and singer
- Gerrits Lambrechts (1666–1705), Flemish/Dutch printmaker
- Jan Baptist Lambrechts (1680-aft.1731), Flemish genre painter
- Jos Lambrechts (1936–2015), Belgian sprinter
- Kerstiaen Lambrechts (early 17th century–1659), Flemish painter
- Lambrecht Lambrechts (1865–1932), Belgian Flemish-language poet
- Marcel Lambrechts (born 1931), Belgian sprinter
- Morten Diderik Emil Lambrechts (1824–1900), Norwegian jurist and politician
- Paul Lambrichts (born 1954), Belgian football defender
- Sigurd Lambrechts (1863–1941), Norwegian civil servant
- Thorstein Lambrechts (1856–1933), Norwegian bookseller

== See also ==
- Hugo Lambrechts Music Centre, classical music educational center in Cape Town
- Woluwe-Saint-Lambert (Sint-Lambrechts-Woluwe), municipality in the Brussels-Capital Region
