= Lambrecht =

Lambrecht is a Germanic name and may refer to:

== People ==
=== Given name ===
- Jan Lambrecht Domien Sleeckx (1818–1901), Flemish writer
- Master of the Saint Lambrecht Votive Altarpiece (fl. 1410 – 1440), Austrian painter

=== Surname ===
- Annick Lambrecht (born 1969), Belgian politician
- Bjorg Lambrecht (1997–2019), Belgian road bicycle racer
- Christine Lambrecht (born 1965), German politician
- Henri-Charles Lambrecht (1848–1889), bishop of Ghent
- Kálmán Lambrecht (1889–1936), Hungarian palaeontologist
- P. J. Tracy, pseudonym of American authors Patricia J. (died 2016) and Traci Lambrecht
- Ray Lambrecht (1918–2014), American car dealer
- Roger Lambrecht (1916–1979), Belgian road bicycle racer
- Walter R. L. Lambrecht (born 1955), Belgian physicist

== Places ==
- Lambrecht (Verbandsgemeinde), Germany
  - Lambrecht, Rhineland-Palatinate
- Sankt Lambrecht, Austria
  - Saint Lambert's Abbey, a Benedictine monastery

== Other uses ==
- 2861 Lambrecht, an asteroid named after Hermann Lambrecht (1908-1983), University of Jena astronomer

== See also ==
- Lambrechts, Dutch patronymic surname
- Lambrichs, surname of the same origin
- Lambert, English and French name
