= We Do =

We Do may refer to:

- We Do (documentary), a 2015 American film about marriage equality
- We Do, a 2019 album by Ikimono-gakari
- "We Do", a 2020 song by Kenny Chesney from Here and Now
- "We Do", a song from the 1995 Simpsons episode "Homer the Great"

== See also ==
- Wedo (disambiguation)
