= Wedo =

Wedo, WEDO or WeDo may refer to:

- WEDO, a radio station in Pittsburgh, Pennsylvania, US
- West–Eastern Divan Orchestra, based in Seville, Spain
- Women's Environment and Development Organization, based in New York City, US
- WeDo, an educational robotics set by Lego Education

== People ==
- Wedo Georgetti (1911–2005), American artist
- Wedo Martini (1913–1970), American baseball player

== See also ==
- We Do (disambiguation)
