= Mindy Weisel =

American painter

Mindy Weisel is an American abstract visual artist and author.

== Early life and education ==
Weisel was born in Bergen-Belsen, Germany. Her parents were survivors of the Auschwitz concentration camp.

Weisel began to paint when she was 14 years old. She attended California State University from 1965 to 1974 and the Otis Art Institute in 1971. She obtained her Bachelor of Fine Arts degree at George Washington University in 1977 and performed post-graduate studies at the American University. She is the cousin of Nobel Prize winner author Elie Wiesel.

== Career ==
=== Art ===
Weisel has had numerous solo and group exhibitions in both Germany and the U.S. including a 2013 show at the Kreeger Museum in Washington DC. Her work is permanently displayed at several American museums including the Smithsonian Institution's National Museum of American Art, Baltimore Museum of Art and the Hirshhorn Museum.

Her work can also be seen at the United States Embassy in Berlin, Germany and the Israel Museum in Jerusalem.

In 2019 she curated the Of Wonder exhibit in the Jerusalem Biennale which featured artists such as Miriam Mörsel Nathan, Raquel Sanchez and others.

=== Books ===
She is the author of several books including Touching Quiet: Reflections in Solitude and the editor of Daughters of Absence: Transforming a Legacy of Loss.

In 2021 her memoir AFTER: The Obligation of Beauty was published which discusses her experiences growing up the daughter of Holocaust survivors. parents

== Selected solo art exhibitions ==
- 2017 Mediations of Love, Rosenbach Contemporary, Israel
- 2014–2018 Crossover: Glass Installation, Eretz Israel Museum, Tel Aviv
- 2013 Not Neutral, Lorch & Seidel Galerie, Berlin, Germany
- 2013 NOT NEUTRAL, Kreeger Museum, Washington, DC
- 2011 Visiting Artist Exhibition, Gensler Architects, Washington, DC
- 2010 AFTER: The Survival of Beauty, Jean Albano Gallery, Chicago, IL
- 2009 Full Circle, Lorch & Seidel Galerie, Berlin, Germany
- 2008 Of Roses and Rasa, Prada Gallery, Washington, DC
- 2006 Words on a Journey, Katzen Arts Center, American University, Washington, DC
- 2005 Out of the Blue, Reed Savage Gallery, Miami, FL
- Cover to Cover, Maryland Federation of Art, Annapolis, MD
- 2004 All That is Remembered, Jean Albano Gallery, Chicago, IL
- 25 Years of Painting, Strand on Volta Gallery, Washington, DC
- 2003 Nine Anniversaries of Blue, Jean Albano Gallery, Chicago, IL
- 2002 Translations, Troyer Gallery, Washington, DC
- Tikkun Ha'Olam: Meditations in Blue, Yale University, New Haven, CT
- Beauty as Consolation, Yale University School of Medicine, New Haven, CT
- 2001 Ella the Muse, Lydon Fine Arts, Chicago, IL
- 1999–2000 Mindy Weisel, 1979–1999, Lydon Fine Arts, Chicago, IL
- 1999 In the Presence of Absence, Troyer Gallery, Washington, DC
- 1997 A Place for Memory, Troyer Fitzpatrick Lassman, Washington, DC
- 1995 Lili, Let's Dance, Troyer Fitzpatrick Lassman, Washington, DC
- 1993 Touching Quiet, Jones Troyer Fitzpatrick, Washington, DC
- 1992 A Harmony of Sorts, Jones Troyer Fitzpatrick, Washington, DC
- 1990 Night of the Soul, Daniel Broder Gallery, New York
- 1989 Echoes, Jones Troyer Fitzpatrick, Washington, DC
- 1986 Selected Paintings, Baumgartner Gallery, Washington, DC
- 1985 Passions and Appearances, Bertha Urdang Gallery, New York, NY
- Gypsy, Baumgartner Gallery, Washington, DC
- Layers of Time, Elise Meyer, New York
- 1984 Black Gifts, Baumgartner Gallery, Washington, DC
- 1983 Transitions: Paintings from 1979-1983, B'nai Brith Museum, Washington, DC
- 1982 Lili in Blue, Jack Rasmussen Gallery, Washington, DC
- 1981 Recent Paintings, Jack Rasmussen Gallery, Washington, DC
- 1980 Paintings of the Holocaust, Jack Rasmussen Gallery, Washington, DC
- 1977 Works on Paper, Diane Brown Gallery, Washington, DC

== Awards and national commissions ==
- 2012 Gottesman Etching Center, Kibbutz Cabri, Israel
- 2008 Painting Fellowship, Virginia Center for the Creative Arts, Sweet Briar, VA
- 2004 Fellowship, Virginia Center for the Creative Arts, Sweet Briar, VA
- 2001–present Smithsonian: Archives of American Artists
- 1997–98 NASA Art Program Commission, Celebrating Women in Space
- 1995–present Art in Embassies Program, State Department, Washington, DC
- 1999–present Member, Women's Forum of Washington, Washington, DC
- 1996–98 Board of Directors, Washington Area Lawyers for the Arts, Washington, DC
- 1993 Fellowship, Mishkenot Sha'ananim, Jerusalem, Israel
- 1992 Fellowship, Virginia Center for the Creative Arts, Sweet Briar, VA
- 1991 Commission, Smithsonian Resident Associates Program, Serigraph Flowers for a Country
- 1998 Artist-in-Residence, Haifa University, Haifa, Israel
- Commission, International Human Rights Law Group
- 1987 Nomination, Award in the Visual Arts
- Commission, Amnesty International Poster
- Commission, Washington Area Lawyers for the Arts, Original Limited Edition Silkscreen
- 1986 Rutgers National Works on Paper Award, Stedman Art Gallery

== Personal life ==
Weisel is married and has three daughters. She practices Transcendental Meditation.
