= Constance Edith Fowler =

American artist, writer, and educator

- Born: June 2, 1907; International Falls, Minnesota
- Died: May 11, 1996 (aged 88); Oregon City, Oregon
- Known for: Expressive realism of wood engravings and oil paintings

Constance Edith Fowler (1907–1996) was an American artist known as a painter and printmaker, an author, and an educator who taught at Willamette University and Albion College.

== Early life and education ==
Constance Edith Fowler was born June 2, 1907, in International Falls, Minnesota. She was the daughter of immigrants George Fowler, a butcher from England, and Matilda Einfeld (Braaker) Fowler, from Hamburg. The family lived in Aitken, Cuyuna, and Crosby, Minnesota, before moving to Pullman, Washington, in 1923, where she finished high school. She earned an A.B. at Washington State College in 1929, studying with the painter William McDermitt. She also studied for three terms at the University of Washington before moving to California, and later to Salem, Oregon in 1932. She enrolled during five summers at the University of Oregon, where she was supported by three summer Carnegie grants; she studied there with Walter R. B. Willcox and Andrew Vincent, earning an M.F.A. in 1940.

== Career ==
In Salem during the depression, she gave art lessons for a dollar per session, and volunteered to run an art club for Willamette University students. In 1935 Fowler "became a founding faculty member of Willamette University’s art department". She taught art at Willamette University from 1935 to 1947, and from 1949 to 1956, she taught summer classes at Central Washington State and Bayview Summer College in Michigan. Fowler taught at Albion College in Michigan from 1947 until her retirement to Seal Rock, Oregon, in 1965, where she continued to exhibit locally. After a stroke in 1993, she lived in Milwaukie, Oregon, with her sister, and then went to a nursing home in Oregon City. She died in 1996.

== Critical reception ==
Critics have observed that Constance Fowler's works range from representational or expressive realism to abstract. Fowler published a limited edition of her master's thesis, which included twenty wood engravings of Willamette Valley historic sites and explanatory text, entitled The Old Days, In and Near Salem, Oregon. When it was displayed at the Salem library, the library staff wrote,

"The Old Days, in and Near Salem, Oregon," written and illustrated by Constance Fowler of the art department at Willamette University... is by far the most beautiful and interesting book about Salem ever published. The people who have long admired Miss Fowler's wood engravings in are gallery exhibits will find new pleasure in this collection of 20 illustrations printed from the original wood blocks.

— "Family Bookshelf, by the Library Staff". Statesman Journal. February 2, 1941. p. 12.

The Capitol Journal of Salem said, "The pioneer period of our native state is graphically presented in the twenty wood engravings of historic spots around Salem done by Constance Fowler... Miss Fowler has been accorded recognition as one of the northwest's outstanding artists. She is an annual exhibitor in the northwest and Pacific coast galleries. One of her pictures was selected a prize to the state, winning first place in National Art Week in 1940."

Biographer Roger Hull has said of Fowler's move to Michigan, "Leaving Oregon in 1947 was a major step at a crucial moment in the cultural history of the United States, with World War II at an end and younger artists questioning the values of American Regionalism and realism."

In another analysis, Hull wrote,

Her fortunes greatly changed with her departure from Oregon in 1947... Fowler's realism had been inflected with expressive abstraction, but the challenges of Abstract Expressionism and complete nonrepresentation were difficult for her to deal with... she spent the rest of her career experimenting with vocabularies of painterly and geometric abstraction, relying most consistently upon the Pacific Ocean off the Oregon coast for her fluent, abstract vocabulary.

— Roger Hull

Commenting in 1957, that "Her recent work, now on display at the Bush Museum, will no doubt surprise many of these admirers, both for the new aesthetic approaches and the new concepts that motivate this work", Carl Hall explored differences in her later works that are "very contemporary in her concern for the abstract consequence", with "this atomic age the great impersonal forces at work in the universe have to be taken into account" and the "human frailty with which we confront them". Hall continued,

Hence this new work while still very spirited in concept and execution is different from the more intimate work of former years... Much of it is common to the modern movement in art, even to the symbolical forms she makes use of, but in certain works something distinctive is said that haunts one's imagination.

— Carl Hall, "Images"

Roger Hull reported she was aware of perplexing some of her viewers, and she "wrote with a note of ruefulness", that "The term 'abstract' causes many mortals to barricade the windows of their minds and reach for the aspirin." In 1996 Hull wrote, "she was rightly recognized as an artist genuinely expressive of the mood and poetry of the Northwest. More than most others, she sensed and expressed the turbulence and darkness of nature, as well."

== Selected exhibitions ==
Fowler's works are held in the permanent collections of Portland Art Museum, Willamette University, and Washington State University Library. Her works have been exhibited at the Seattle Art Museum and the New York World's Fair in 1939. Her work was in San Francisco Museum of Art’s "Oregon Artists" exhibition. In 1949, she held a one-person show at the Memorial Auditorium in Indianapolis, and in 1968 she exhibited at the Willamette University Gallery.

== Publications ==
- Fowler, Constance E. (1940). The Old Days In and Near Salem Oregon. Seattle: Dogwood Press (Frank McCaffrey); Limited Edition. ASIN B0021VZ9CU.
- Fowler, Constance E. (1990). Constance E. Fowler: Inventory; Artist Teacher. Constance Fowler. ASIN B004JOLNX6.

== Awards ==
- William G. Purcell prize, best work in Oregon Society of Artists spring exhibition, 1934
- Carnegie grants, summers, 1936 through 1938
- First place, National Art Week, 1940
- Katherine B. Baker Memorial Purchase prize, 28th annual exhibition of northwest artisls, Seattle Art Museum, 1942.
- Willamette University award, 1991

== See also ==
- List of 20th-century women artists
- List of American artists 1900 and after
- List of printmakers
- Expressionism
- Modern art
- Western painting
