= Rowden =

Rowden is a surname. Notable people with the surname include:

- Caleb Rowden (born 1982), American politician
- Daniel Rowden (born 1997), British middle-distance runner
- Darlene Rowden, Canadian politician in Saskatchewan
- Diana Rowden, Special Operations Executive agent in World War II. Executed by the Germans
- Frances Rowden (1774-c. 1840), British poet and schoolmistress
- Larry Rowden (born 1949), American football linebacker
- Mark Rowden (born in 1979), Australian printmaker
- Walter Courtney Rowden, British screenwriter and film director
- William H. Rowden (1930–2022), United States Navy vice admiral

== See also ==
- Rowden, Texas
- A location in England
- Rowden Mill railway station, a preserved building in England
