= American Artists School =

Former art school in New York City

Coordinates: 40°44′17.5″N 73°59′54″W

- New York City; United States

Information
- Type: Art school
- Established: 1936
- Closed: 1941

The American Artists School was a progressive independent art school in New York City associated with socialism and the American Radical movement.

The school was founded in April 1936 at 131 West 14th Street, upon the dissolution of the John Reed Club School of Art. Its founders and board of directors included members and former members of the John Reed Club such as William Gropper, as well as contributors to the New Masses and the Daily Worker, and notable artists such as Margaret Bourke-White and Louis Schanker. Harry Gottlieb was its first director and Henry Billings the first secretary.

The school emphasized art that was not only technically excellent but also alive to the social and class realities of the day, and stressed socially relevant content. A statement from the school's brochure of 1936 reads,

"The American Artists School established [as] its fundamental premise...that the student must be developed as an independent thinker at the same time he is trained to be a competent artist. We believe that America contains infinite painting material, and that the student who learns to understand and appreciate it cannot but evolve into a socially constructive artist."

The school suffered from financial difficulties and closed in the spring of 1941; however, the significant role it played in integrating art and society in the thirties was recognized by both the liberal and radical press.

== Personnel ==
Students at the school included Jacob Lawrence, Theodoros Stamos, Lucille Wallenrod, Ad Reinhardt, Elaine de Kooning, Jack McLarty, Harry Shoulberg, Milton Resnick, and Fay Kleinman.

Teachers included the sculptor Joseph Konzal, the cartoonist Fred Ellis, Philip Evergood, Milton Hebald, Sol Wilson, Louis Schanker, Francis Criss, Walter Quirt, Moses Soyer, Louis Lozowick, and Abraham Harriton, and symposia featured lectures by Samuel Putnam, Charmion von Wiegand, and Martha Graham. Russian-born Anton Refregier was a member of the faculty and at one point chairman of the board.

== Sources ==
- Marquardt, Virginia Hagelstein. "The American Artists School: Radical Heritage and Social Content Art." Archives of American Art Journal, Vol. 26, No. 4. (1986), pp. 17–23.
- Artists on the Left, by Andrew Hemingway
