= Georgetti =

Georgetti is a surname. Notable people with the surname include:

- Diena Georgetti (born 1966), Australian painter
- Eduardo Georgetti (1866–1937), Puerto Rican agriculturist, businessman, philanthropist and politician
- Ken Georgetti, Canadian trade unionist
- Wedo Georgetti (1911–2005), American painter, etcher, lithographer and sculptor

== See also ==
- William Georgetti Scholarship
