= Shaler =

Shaler may refer to:

- Shaler (crater), lunar impact crater
- Shaler Mountains, mountain range in Canada
- Shaler Battery, American Civil War fort
- Shaler Township, Pennsylvania
- Shaler (surname)
- Shaler cliffs
- Shaler North Hills Library
- Shaler Halimon (1945 – 2021), American basketball player
