= Shaler (surname) =

- Pronunciation: [Shay-lr]

Origin
- Origin: English
- Meaning: One who Limps or Shambles
- Region of origin: Middlesex

Shaler is a surname. Notable people with the surname include:

- Alexander Shaler (1827–1911), Union Army general
- Lynn Shaler (born 1955), American artist
- Nathaniel Shaler (1841–1906), American paleontologist and geologist
- William Shaler (1733–1833), American diplomat and writer
