= Raquel Sanchez =

Artist and poet

Raquel Sanchez (born 1960s) is a multidisciplinary visual artist and poet.

== Early life ==
Sanchez was born in Paris, France to Ellen Lapidus Stern, an American artist and Juan Sánchez Peláez, celebrated Venezuelan poet and winner of the National Prize winner for Literature. She grew up travelling between New York, Ibiza, Morocco and Venezuela and meeting famous artists such as Mark Rothko, Andy Warhol and Jean-Michel Basquiat.

== Art ==
Sanchez's oil paintings were featured in the 2019 Jerusalem Biennale in the Of Wonder exhibit held at the North Africa Jewish Heritage Center. Her work was hand-picked by curator Mindy Weisel whom she met at the Uri Rosenbach Contemporary gallery. The grand opening featured Sanchez painting in front of a live audience accompanied by musicians Daniel Zamir and Kobi Arad. Her art was again featured in the Jerusalem Biennale in 2021

Her work has been used in publications such as Makor Rishon Arc and Can Magazine. She is a featured artist in the Rosenbach Contemporary gallery in Jerusalem.

In 2024 she participated in Helmets for Heroes, with proceeds going to NATAL – the Israel Trauma and Resiliency Center. In 2024 her exhibition Many Waters was featured at The Artist's House in Rishon LeZion curated by Vera Pilpoul. It was described as "figurative and the abstract," with elements "given to seascapes, and seawater as one of the elements in the universe and as a reflection of human feelings and experiences. Another representation is given to the sky, which is sometimes blue, a color that means heavenly and spiritual, and sometimes changes to other shades."

In January 2025, her exhibition Viewing Spirituality was displayed at The Artists’ House in Tel Aviv and reviewed favorably by The Jerusalem Post as "abstract but have clear figurative elements." In April 2025 her art was featured at the Periscope Gallery in Tel Aviv as part of the Behind the Reflection exhibition.

In October 2025 Sanchez's solo exhibition Light from Darkness was shown at the Marie Gallery in Jerusalem and featured her paintings and foray into book binding and screen-printing. In November 2025 she was featured in Fragments, an exhibition in Jerusalem of art dealing with the October 7th massacre in Israel.

== Poetry ==
Sanchez is a published poet with her work appearing multiple times in Arc: the Journal of the Israel Association of Writers in English, chaired by Karen Alkalay-Gut. She has also been published in the International Library of Poetry and Voices Israel.

In 2022, she was co-translator of a new bilingual edition of poetry by her father Juan Sánchez Peláez entitled El alba es el leopardo.

== Social work ==
Sanchez earned a master's degree in social work from Yeshiva University. She worked for Congress of Racial Equality in the late 1980s as a social worker and in the legal department. In the 1990s, she founded and directed the Rose Institute, a center for at-risk youth in Jerusalem. It was called a sanctuary for English-speaking youth. The Rose Institute partnered with Kidum Noar, an at-risk youth program in Jerusalem and the Ministry of Education in 2001 to form Crossroads Jerusalem.
