= Harry Shoulberg =

American painter (1903–1995)

- Born: October 25, 1903; Philadelphia, Pennsylvania
- Died: April 15, 1995 (aged 91); New York City
- Occupations: New York Expressionist painter and serigraph artist

Harry Shoulberg (1903 – 1995) was an American expressionist painter. He was known to be among the early group of WPA artists working in the screen print (serigraph) medium, as well as oil.

== Biography ==
Harry Shoulberg was born October 25, 1903, in Philadelphia, Pennsylvania. His father, Max Shoulberg, was the fourth of twenty children and the first to be born in America. His mother was Tessie Derfler, a New Yorker of German descent. Harry Shoulberg grew up in New York, married Sylvia Hendler in 1931, and had one child, Ted. Harry Shoulberg died April 15, 1995, in New York City.

== Studied ==
Harry Shoulberg attended City College of New York where he studied biochemical engineering for three years before switching to fine arts in his last year. He continued his art education at the John Reed School, 1934–1935; the American Artists School, 1935–1937; and then privately at the studios of artists Sol Wilson (1894–1974) and Carl Holty.

== Serigraphs ==
A native of Philadelphia, Pennsylvania, Harry Shoulberg in 1944 became a member of the National Serigraph Society. His serigraphs have been exhibited at the Corcoran Gallery, the Library of Congress and the Audubon Society. His serigraphs have won prizes from the National Serigraph Society and the American Color Print Society and are in the Baltimore Museum of Art, The Carnegie Institute, the San Francisco Museum of Fine Arts, the Milwaukee Art Institute and the Smithsonian American Art Museum, Washington, D.C.

== Exhibitions ==
Harry Shoulberg participated in the Works Progress Administration/Federal Art Project (WPA/FAP) (1936–1942). He exhibited;

- 1936: in the Temporary Galleries of the Municipal Art Committee, City of New York;
- 1938: Teachers' Exhibition, New York City;
- 1940: New York World's Fair, United American Artists;
- 1941: Corcoran "Biennial," The American Federation of Arts circ.; The New York Council for Art week, Inc., the painting was purchased by Metropolitan Museum of Art: (Rockport Street, 1941);
- 1942: Puma Gallery, New York City;
- 1943: "Art for Bonds," Artists Associates, New York City;
- 1944, 1945: National Serigraph Society's Fourth Annual, Norlyst Gallery;
- 1945: Modernage Art Gallery;
- 1946: "American Print Show," Carnegie Institute, Pittsburgh, Pennsylvania;
- 1946, 1947: Serigraph Galleries;
- 1947: Frances Webb Galleries Los Angeles; University of Denver, Colorado, Paintings; Cape Ann Society of Modern Artists, Rockport, Massachusetts;
- 1947, 1948: "Current American Prints," Carnegie Institute, Pittsburgh, PA;
- 1949: Philadelphia Print Club, 10th Annual Color Print Society; National Serigraph Society's 12th Annual, Serigraph Galleries, New York City; The Bearskin Neck Art Gallery, Rockport, Massachusetts;
- 1950: "First National Print competition," National Serigraph Society circ., under Department of the Army shown in Germany, Japan and Austria; The University Gallery, University of Minnesota, Minneapolis, Minnesota
- 1956: The Joe and Emily Foundation, 8th Annual Emily Lowe Competition; Guild Hall Annual Members' Exhibition, East Hampton, Long Island;
- 1957: Silvermine Guild of Artists, Inc.;
- 1956, 1963, 1966, 1973, 1979, 1982, 1984: Painters and Sculptors Society of New Jersey, Inc.;
- 1963, 1967, 1969: Norfolk Museum of Arts & Sciences; Norfolk, Virginia;
- 1965: 23rd Annual Audubon Artists, Inc., New York City;
- 1966: American Society of Contemporary Artists: 49th Annual;
- 1968, 1975: The Butler Institute of American Art, Youngstown, Ohio;
- 1968, 1973, 1976: Harbor Gallery, Cold Spring Harbor, New York;
- 1968 1976, 1980: American Society of Contemporary Artists, Brooklyn, New York;
- 1969: High Point Gallery, Lenox, MA;

== Collections ==
- Albrecht Gallery, St. Joseph, Missouri;
- University of Arizona, Tucson, Arizona
- Baltimore Museum of Art, Maryland;
- The Butler Institute of American Art, Youngstown, Ohio;
- The Carnegie Institute, Pittsburgh, PA;
- Denver Art Museum, Colorado;
- Metropolitan Museum of Art, New York City;
- Milwaukee Art Museum, Wisconsin;
- Norfolk Museum, Virginia;
- San Francisco Museum of Modern Art, California;
- Binghamton University, New York;
- State of New Jersey, Jersey City State College, New Jersey;
- Tel Aviv Art Museum, Israel;
- Wichita State University, Kansas;

== Awards ==
- 1943: Artists Associates, New York City, "Art for Bonds:" 1st prize;
- 1948: Milwaukee Art Museum, Purchase Prize;
- 1949: National Serigraph Society, 10th Annual Exhibition, New York, Purchase Prize;
- 1949: American Color Print Society, Philadelphia, Pennsylvania, Florence F. Tonner Prize;
- 1952: Guild Hall Annual Members' Exhibition, East Hampton, Long Island, 1st prize;
- 1956: The Painters and Sculptors Society of New Jersey, Inc., Jane Peterson Philipp Prize;
- 1956: The Joe and Emily Lowe Foundation, 8th Annual Emily Lowe Competition;
- 1957: Silvermine Guild of Artists, Inc, Albert Kapp Award;
- 1961: The Brooklyn Society of Artists
- 1963: The Painters and Sculptors Society of New Jersey, Inc., "The Grambacher" Artist Material Co., Award;
- 1965: Audubon Artists, Inc., New York City: 23rd Annual, Jane Peterson Award;
- 1966: American Society of Contemporary Artists: 49th Annual, M.J. Kaplan Memorial Award;
- 1966: The Painters and Sculptors Society of New Jersey, Inc., Talens & Son Material Award;

== See also ==
- Art movement
- Art periods
- Expressionism

== Sources ==
- Peter H Falk, Who was who in American art: compiled from the original thirty-four volumes of American art annual--Who's who in art, biographies of American artists active from 1898-1947 Publisher: Madison, Conn.: Sound View Press, 1985. ISBN 0-932087-00-0, ISBN 978-0-932087-00-3
- Peter H Falk; Audrey M Lewis; Georgia Kuchen; Veronika Roessler, Who was who in American art, 1564-1975: 400 years of artists in America Publisher: Madison, CT.: Sound View Press, 1999. ISBN 0-932087-55-8, ISBN 978-0-932087-55-3
- ''Smithsonian Institution Research Information System; Archival, Manuscript and Photographic Collections, Harry Shoulberg

== Books ==
- Albert Reese, American Prize Prints of the 20th Century, Publisher: American Artists Group, Inc, New York, 1949. OCLC: 1326950
- Margaret Harold, Prize-winning art/book 7. Paintings, graphics, watercolors, sculpture Publisher: Fort Lauderdale, Florida, Allied Publications, 1967. OCLC: 20547886

== External links for image reproduction ==
- Harry Shoulberg serigraphs from keithsheridan.com
- Harry Shoulberg painting from askart.com
