= Bayview College =

Coordinates: 38°20′42.8″S 141°36′20.5″E

- Portland, Victoria; Australia

Information
- Type: Independent, co-educational, secondary, day
- Motto: To Believe, To Think, To Achieve
- Established: 1976
- Principal: Michelle Bishop (Acting)
- Years: 7 to 12
- Enrolment: ~350
- Colours: Dark blue, gold
- Website: www.bayview.vic.edu.au

Bayview College is an independent, co-educational, secondary, day school located in Portland, Victoria, Australia.

== About the school ==
Bayview College is a Christian Community College, situated in a position which overlooks Portland Bay. It has both historic and new facilities which are constantly upgraded to meet the changing needs of the school community.

== History ==
Bayview College has a long history, as part of the Loreto Sisters' school that was established on that location in 1885. Mother Gonzaga Barry planned a Loreto foundation in Portland after spending time by the sea convalescing from an illness in around 1882. She was very keen to be able to provide holidays for her nuns and pupils and also a boarding and day school for young children. She, and a community of five, came to Portland in December 1884 and rented the six room cottage with lean-to belonging to David Edgar in North Bentinck Street. This bluestone cottage had been built by Stephen Henty in the early 1830s and from 1864–1865 had been Mary Mackillop’s family home and school. In 1885 the Loreto School opened.

In 1977 the school, at the time a Catholic girls' school, became an ecumenical, co-educational Christian Community College, which in turn became Bayview in 1996. Member churches are Anglican, Baptist, Catholic, Lutheran and the Uniting Church in Australia. Loreto continues actively to support Bayview.
