= Master I. A. M. of Zwolle =

Anonymous 15th-century Dutch engraver

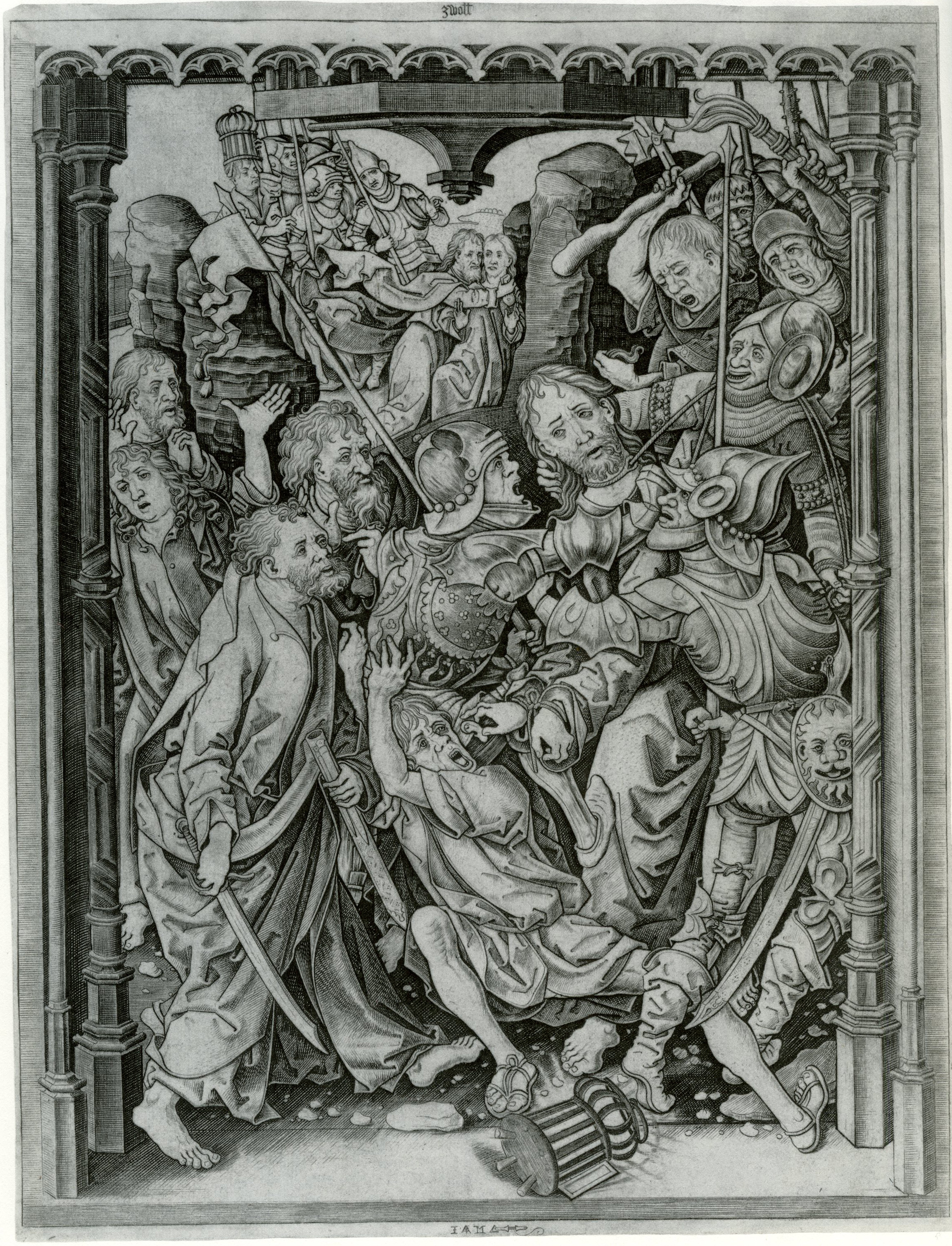
The Betrayal of Christ, (c. 1485). 35.6 x 27.2 cm (sheet size). This is one of a series of Passion prints by Master I. A. M. – others include The Last Supper and The Agony in the Garden.

Master I. A. M. of Zwolle (known works 1470–1490, lifetime estimated as c. 1440–1504) was an anonymous Dutch goldsmith and engraver who signed many of his works with his initials I. A. M. or I. A., and added "Zwolle" to some. His work is characterized by crowded and active scenes of people, graded tones and crisp strokes. Only 26 works by his hand are extant.

== Identity ==
One theory of Master I. A. M.'s identity points to Johan van den Minnesten (also spelled Mynnesten, b. c. 1440, d. 1504) as the artist behind the engravings. This obscure artist was a painter in Zwolle, but none of his works have survived, so it is impossible to prove a connection on stylistic grounds. The only link between him and Master I. A. M. is a record that his son, also named Johan, was paid to print several engravings for the city of Zwolle in 1545; these were possibly plates inherited from his father.

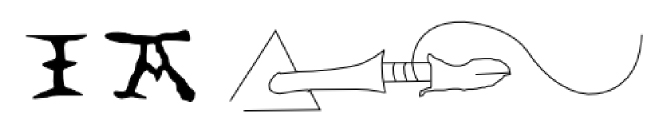
The signature of Master I. A. M. as it appears on The Madonna Seated, the Christ Child Holding the Cross. The object depicted is a medieval gold drill, the insignia of a goldsmith. Initially it was believed to represent a weaver's shuttle.

Another theory posits that Master I.A.M's prints were produced by two collaborating artists, one who designed the prints and another who engraved and printed them. In this theory I. A. M. could stand for "Johannes Aurifaber Meester" (Master John the Goldsmith), possibly Johannes Ludolphi, a goldsmith who arrived in Zwolle in 1479. One variation of this theory supposes that the signature contains the marks of both artists: I. A. M. would be Johann van den Minnesten's signature, while the image of a drill is the hallmark of the goldsmith / engraver. This collaborative theory would explain the vast differences in composition between the still and simple The Madonna Seated, the Christ Child Holding the Cross and the manneristically dynamic The Betrayal of Christ.

== Work ==
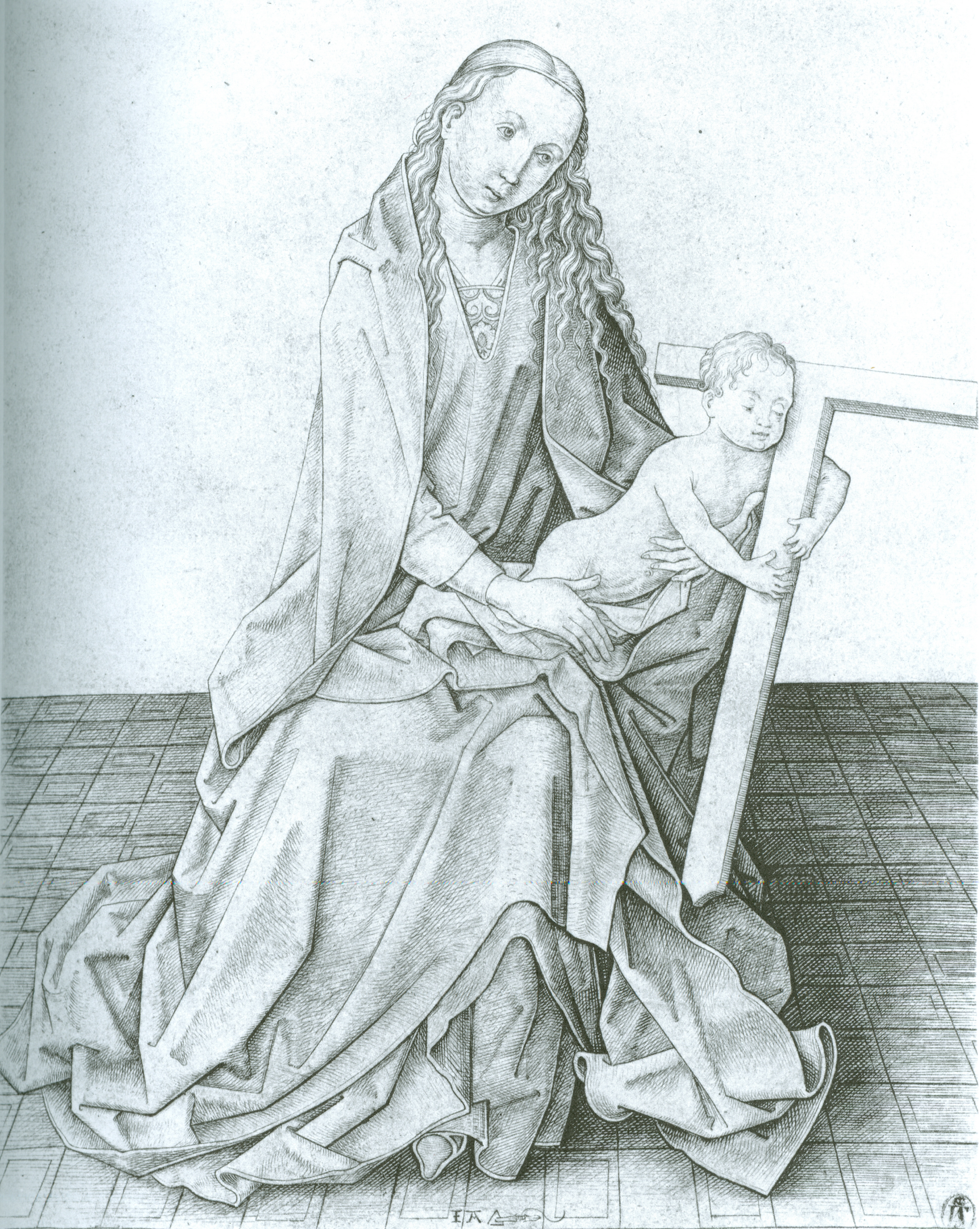
The Madonna Seated, the Christ Child Holding a Cross. Engraving, 21.8 x 17.7 cm (sheet size).

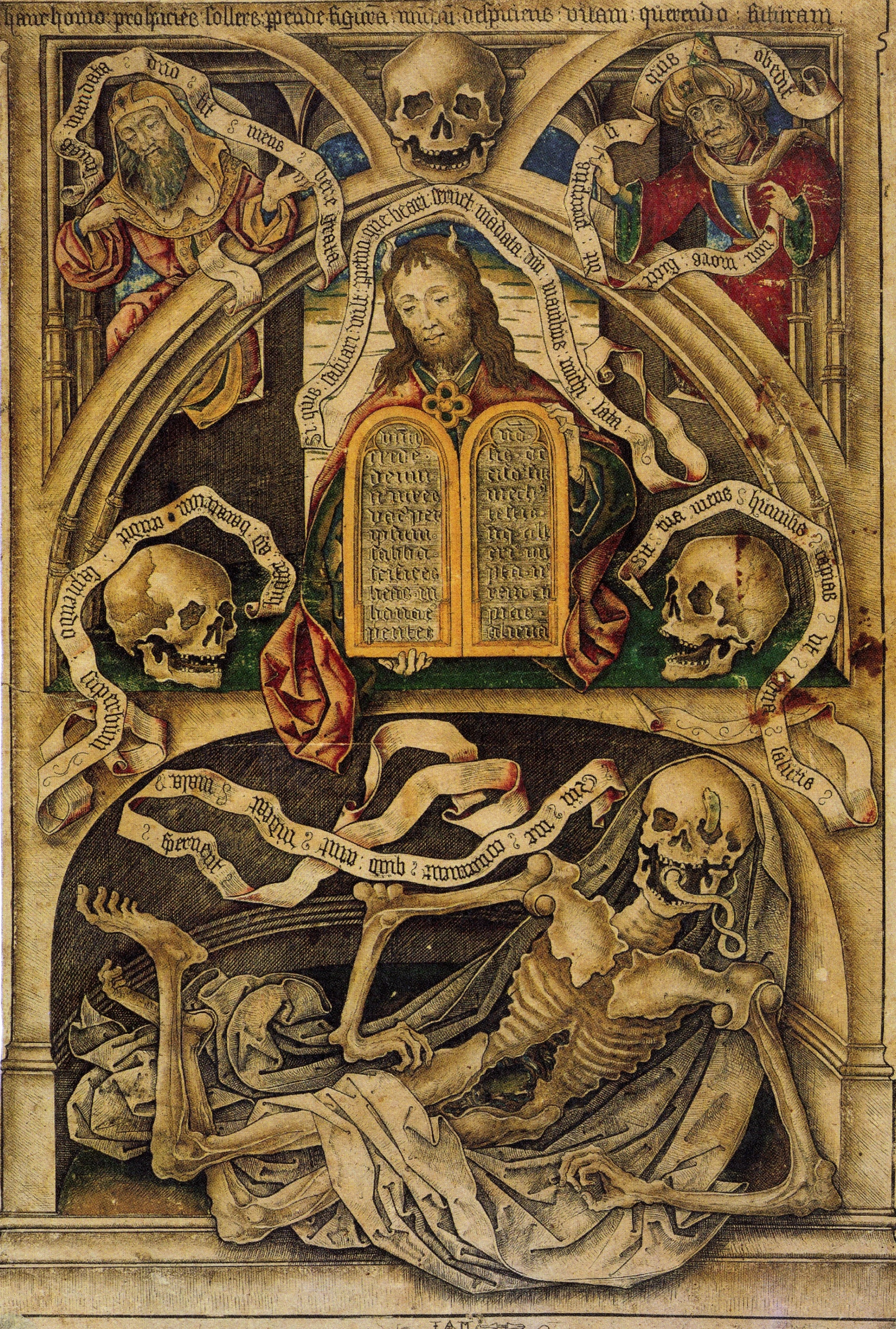
Allegory of the Transience of Life,(c. 1480–90), 33.3 x 22.6 cm, engraving printed on vellum, with hand-colouring. British Museum

Master I. A. M. produced original and inventive compositions in a style that has been variously described as "lively", "dramatic", "turbulent" "refined" and marked by "Dutch swagger". His engraving technique was careful and neat but tending to dryness. Later prints show more dramatic use of tonal contrasts, in drapery and other areas. His faces mostly have Dutch peasant features, sometimes bordering on the grotesque. The major influence upon Master I. A. M.'s early work appears to have been Rogier van der Weyden, although he was also influenced by Martin Schongauer. Hieronymous Bosch, a contemporary, also appears to have influenced the grotesque figures in The Betrayal of Christ: Bosch's Christ Carrying the Cross of Vienna is particularly similar.

The artist's style appears to have changed dramatically around 1485; the drapery of his figures became more sculptural, separated into broad planes like contemporary wood sculptures, as opposed to his earlier and more fluid style. This has generated speculation among scholars that some of these later prints were either designs for wood relief sculptures, or were based upon reliefs that are now lost. This is partially supported by records that Johan van den Minnesten was commissioned to paint several relief sculptures.

His most involved work was a series of passion engravings, of which only The Last Supper, The Agony in the Garden, and The Betrayal of Christ survive.

=== List of works ===
Dimensions given are that of the image. The essence of printmaking is the production of multiple images, so most of these works exist in more than one copy and are in the collections of several museums. As with most 15th-century prints, surviving impressions of his works are rare - the three Passion prints survive in 8,8 and 20 impressions only. The works can only be approximately dated, if at all, because so little is known about Master I. A. M.'s life. None of the prints were titled, so they are given generic or descriptive titles that vary slightly between sources. The individual impressions also vary in sheet size.

- The Adoration of the Magi 35.3 x 24 cm
- The Last Supper 34.7 x 26.8 cm
- The Agony in the Garden 39.5 x 29.6 cm
- The Betrayal of Christ 34.1 x 26.8 cm
- The Large Crucifixion with the Horsemen 35.8 x 24.8 cm
- The Lamentation over Christ (Pietà) 26.3 x 30 cm
- Christ Blessing 23.5 x 14.3 cm
- The Virgin and Child with Cherries at the Window 22.5 x 16.2 cm (irregular)
- The Madonna Seated, the Christ Child Holding the Cross 22.5 x 18 cm
- The Virgin Standing on a Demon 22.3 x 14.4 cm
- The Virgin and Child, Turning over the Leaves of a Book 23.8 x 19.5 cm
- Saint Anne, the Virgin and Child on a Throne 26.6 x 19.2 cm
- Saint Augustine with the Heart, Pierced by an Arrow 26.6 x 21 cm
- Saint Bernard Kneeling before the Virgin 32.6 x 26.1 cm
- Saint Christopher on Horseback 28.6 x 20.6 cm
- Saint George 20.5 x 13.8 cm
- Mass of Saint Gregory 10.2 x 6.4 cm (This particular engraving is a copy after Master W with the Key)
- Mass of Saint Gregory 15.2 x 12.4 cm
- Mass of Saint Gregory 32.3 x 22.4 cm
- Allegory of the Transience of Life 33.3 x 22.6 cm
- Battle of Two Men with the Centaur 15.7 x 22.2 cm
- The Young Man and the Devil 30.7 x 20.6 cm
- Coat of Arms with a Greyhound Supported by a Savage 7.7 cm in diameter
- Gothic Canopy with Windows and Doors 41.6 x 28.1 cm
- The Crucifixion
- Death'' 30.2 x 21.3 cm

== Legacy ==
Master I.A.M.'s prints were often copied by contemporary engravers, but also by artists in other media. In particular the painter Gian Francesco da Tolmezzo based his fresco in Provesano (c. 1496) upon The Betrayal of Christ. Francisco Henriques also based paintings upon I.A.M.'s engravings. Lucas van Leiden developed his style from that of Master I.A.M. and Albrecht Dürer.

His prints were much sought after by prominent collectors. The English writer Samuel Pepys owned copies of the Pietà and The Last Supper, and Ferdinand Columbus (the son of Christopher Columbus) owned a copy of Allegory of the Transience of Life.
