= Antero Olin =

Finnish visual artist (born 1948)

Antero Olin (born June 30, 1948) is a Finnish visual artist, best known as a printmaker (graphic artist). Born in Sysmä, Finland, he lives and works in Helsinki and also in Budapest, Hungary. Italy, especially Rome has always been important working site for him.

Olin's first drawing and painting teachers were prof. Unto Pusa and Urho Lauanne in Helsinki (1965–1969). He continued his studies in Lahti, Finland (1967–1969), but only while studying in Stockholm (1970–71), in Royal Swedish Academy of Arts, he found, as a printmaker, his artistically and technically completed style of making his prints.

He began teaching of the arts already in 1974 in the Finnish Academy of Fine Arts, where he stayed until 1983. Since he has continued teaching throughout the period of his career and played an active role within artists organisations.

Olin's works were on public display at exhibition the first time in 1968. Since then, his works have been shown all over the world in hundreds of events, exhibitions and competitions. Similarly, his works are placed in most of the world's major collections.

== Awards and recognitions ==
- The Finnish State Prize he received in 1971 and 1975.
- He has received numerous awards in several European countries, Taiwan and USA,
- The Finnish Artist Grant he received in 1979 and 1983 - 1987.
