= Gerrit Lambrechts =

Dutch engraver

Gerrit Lambrechts (c. 1666 – September 1705 (buried on 20 September 1705)) was a Flemish-born Dutch engraver and draftsman. He was born in Antwerp but moved to Amsterdam in the 1680s. He was active there from 1687 until 1705, the year of his death.

== Biography ==
He was born in Antwerp, in the Southern Netherlands, around 1666. It has been established that in 1687 he was active in Amsterdam, Dutch Republic. He was an etcher, copperplate engraver, draughtsman, and playing-card maker. He married in Amsterdam, and was active there until 1705, the year of his death.

He died in Amsterdam on 20 September 1705. ECARTICO reports that Lambrechts was a Roman Catholic.

== Family ==
He married Annetje Barents van der Sluijs (1667 - ?) in Amsterdam on 10 October 1687.

== Bibliography ==
- Thieme, Ulrich; Becker, Felix, Allgemeines Lexikon der bildenden Künstler : von der Antike bis zur Gegenwart, Leipzig : Seemann, 1907–1950
- Waller, F.G.; Juynboll, Willem R. (bew.), Biographisch woordenboek van Noord Nederlandsche graveurs [Waller] [herdruk 1974], Amsterdam : Israël, 1974

== Sources ==
- Stadsarchief Amsterdam, Amsterdam: DTB-registers (toegangsnummer 5001), 367: 33, 367: 64, 367: 90, 368: 7, 368: 17, 516: 283, 1230: 408, 1230: 408 & 1251: 273
- Stadsarchief Amsterdam, Amsterdam: Archief van de Notarissen ter standplaats Amsterdam (toegangsnummer 5075), 11073: 194809 (Aktenummer)
- Beyer, Andreas, Savoy, Bénédicte & Tegethoff, Wolf (eds.) Allgemeines Künstlerlexikon Online / Artists of the World Online, s.p.: De Gruyter Saur (s.a.)
- Waller, F.G., Biographisch woordenboek van Noord Nederlandsche graveurs, 's-Gravenhage: Martinus Nijhoff (1938).
