= Kerstiaen Lambrechts =

Flemish painter

Kerstiaen Lambrechts (also known as Christiaen Lambrechts) was a Flemish painter. He was active in Antwerp between 1639 and 1658. He died in Antwerp on 18 September 1659 (or 1660).

== Biography ==
Lambrechts was active as an apprentice in Antwerp's Guild of St. Luke between 18 September 1636 and 18 September 1637. He was a master between 18 September 1644 and 18 September 1645.

On 25 June 1649, Lambrechts rented the house Den Rooden Leeuw, on Kammenstraat, in Antwerp. On 18 October 1658 Lambrechts and his wife Petronilla profited from the inheritance of her mother Catharina Boots.

He was active in Antwerp until 18 October 1658. He died there on 18 September 1659 or 18 September 1660.

== Family ==
He married Petronilla van der Meerschen. Lambrechts had a son, Christiaen Lambrechts II, who also became a painter.

== Bibliography ==
- Rombouts, Ph. & Van Lerius, Th., De Liggeren en andere historische archieven der Antwerpsche Sint Lucasgilde onder de zinspreuk: Wt ionsten versaemt (2 vols.), Antwerpen: Baggerman; ’s Gravenhage: Nijhoff (1864–1876)
- London: Mansell, 1978, A checklist of painters c1200-1976 represented in the Witt Library, Courtauld Institute of Art, London [first ed.], ISBN 0-7201-0718-0
- Duverger, Erik, Antwerpse kunstinventarissen uit de zeventiende eeuw, Brussel : Koninklijke Academie voor Wetenschappen, Letteren en Schone Kunsten van België, 1984–2004
- G. van Hemeldonck, Kunst en kunstenaars (typescript 2007), Felix Archive, Antwerp, no. S-1537
