= William Ensom =

English engraver

- Born: 1796
- Died: 13 September 1832 (aged 35–36)
- Occupation: Engraver

William Ensom (1796–1832), was an English engraver.

== Career ==
Ensom, in 1815 gained a silver prize medal from the Society of Arts for a pen-and-ink portrait of William Blake, poet and painter. He is best known by some small and neatly finished engravings from portraits by Sir Thomas Lawrence, including those of George IV, Master Lambton, Mrs. Arbuthnot, Marchioness of Salisbury, Lady Wallscourt, and others.

He engraved 'Christ blessing the Bread,’ after Carlo Dolce; 'St. John in the Wilderness,’ after Carlo Cignani, and other subjects after Stothard, Smirke, Stephanoff, Bonington, and others; also plates for Neale's 'Views of the Seats of Noblemen and Gentlemen,’ and for annuals, such as the 'Amulet,’ the 'Literary Souvenir,’ &c. Ensom also painted in water-colours, and was an intimate friend of R. P. Bonington.

== Death ==
He died at Wandsworth on 13 Sept. 1832, aged 36. His collection of engravings and drawings was sold by auction on 12 December 1832. He occasionally exhibited at the Suffolk Street Gallery.
