= Lambrichs =

Lambrichs is a surname. Notable people with the surname include:

- Georges Lambrichs (1917–1992), French writer, literary critic, and editor
- Jan Lambrichs (1915–1990), Dutch cyclist
- Louise L. Lambrichs (born 1952), French writer

== See also ==
- Paul Lambrichts (born 1954), Belgian footballer
