= Master W with the Key =

Netherlandish anonymous engraver

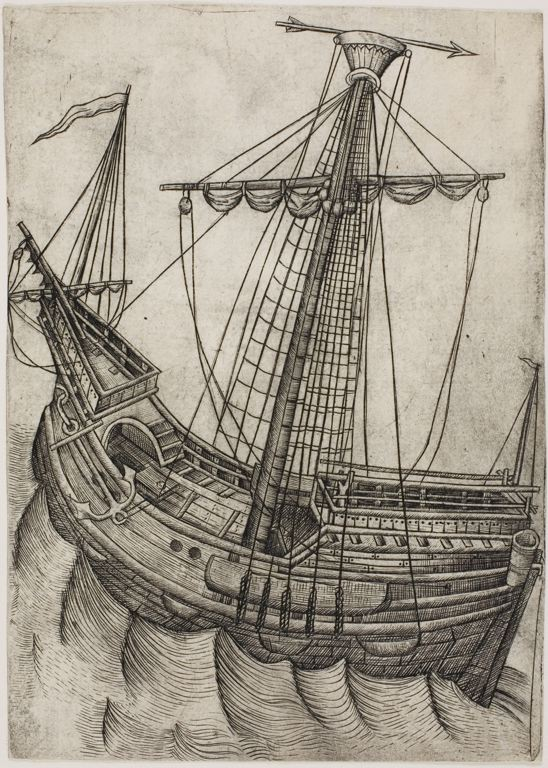
Ship with Sails Furled and Arrow Pointing to the Right (1475–1485). Engraving on paper, 171 x 123 mm. In the collection of the Art Institute of Chicago

Master W with the Key also known as Master WA and Master of the Housemark (active c. 1465–1490) was an anonymous Netherlandish engraver, who is thought to have been a goldsmith in Bruges. The name given to him refers to his monogram, which is a W followed by a key symbol. Eighty-two works signed with that monogram are extant. Many of these are ornament prints, depicting elements of gothic architecture and decorative objects, and were probably marketed mainly as patterns for other craftsmen to follow. He also produced prints of ships, the first known. He influenced several other contemporary Dutch engravers, most notably Master I. A. M. of Zwolle. He probably worked for Duke Charles the Bold of Burgundy, and his ship series may have been "portraits" of the ducal fleet.
