= Maybelle Stamper =

American printmaker (1907–1995)

Maybelle Richardson Stamper
- Born: 1907; Dublin, New Hampshire
- Died: 1995 (aged 87–88); Captiva, Florida

Maybelle Stamper (1907–1995) was an American printmaker.

Stamper studied at the School of the Museum of Fine Arts in Boston and the Art Students League of New York. In 1947 she moved to Captiva Island, Florida, where she became a friend of her neighbor Robert Rauschenberg. Around 1990, she deeded her property to Rauschenberg in exchange for being able to live there and for financial support until her death.

Her work is included in the permanent collections of the Block Museum of Art, the Cincinnati Art Museum, The Museum of Modern Art, the National Gallery of Art, the Smithsonian American Art Museum, and the Currier Museum of Art.
