= Lambrecht Lambrechts =

Flemish writer and poet (1865–1932)

- Born: Lambrecht Renier Lambrechts; 24 September 1865; Hoeselt, Belgium
- Died: 13 August 1932 (aged 66); Ghent, Belgium
- Occupations: Writer, poet
- Writing career
- Pen name: RL Doornkapper, Jan van Hasselt, J. Herten
- Language: Dutch

Lambrecht Lambrechts (24 September 1865 – 13 August 1932) was a Flemish writer and poet. He also published under the pseudonyms RL Doornkapper, Jan van Hasselt and J. Herten.

== Biography ==
Lambrecht Lambrechts, born Lambrecht Renier Lambrechts, was the son of Willem-Hendrik Lambrechts and Rosalia Somers. His father was a head teacher in Hoeselt, which earned him the nickname Lemmen van de Meester.

He attended primary school in Hoeselt and also received his first musical education from the sexton of Werm. He then went to the Royal Athenaeum of Tongeren, where he met Camille Huysmans and Jef Cuvelier.

In 1884 he went to the normal school in Bruges and obtained his diploma of regent of Dutch and English in 1887.

Before getting a job, he took singing lessons at the Royal Conservatory of Liège. In 1889 he was appointed teacher at the Rijksnormaalschool in Ronse, where he remained until 1901.

On 25 August 1894 he married the piano virtuoso Maria Vanden Doorne in Ronse. He performed in over 100 singing evenings in Flanders with her.

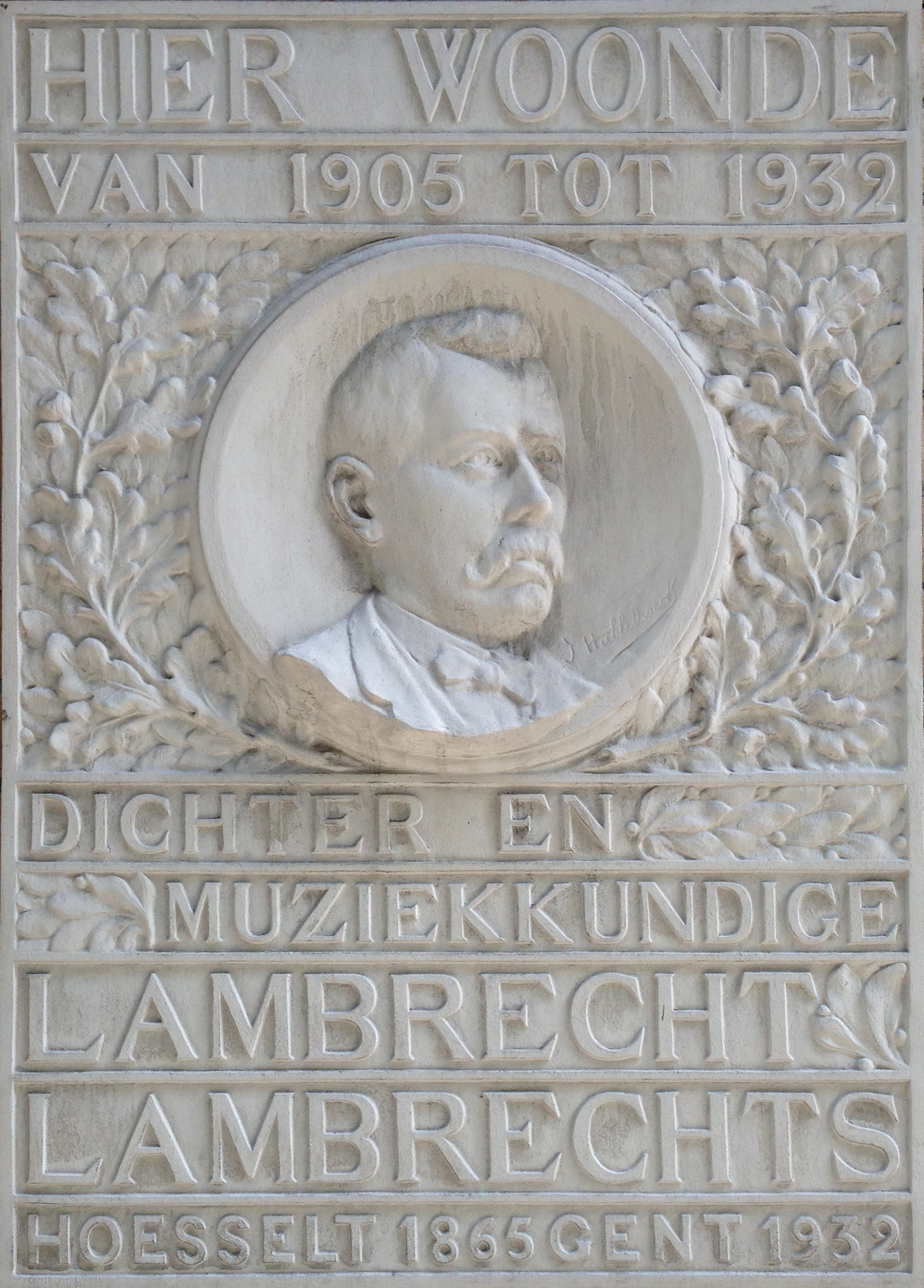
Lambrecht Lambrechts' plaque in Ghent

In 1901 he became a teacher at the normal school in Lier and from 1905 to 1918 at the normal school in Ghent. In 1905 he moved to the Kunstlaan no. 51 in Ghent.

In 1912 he became a knight of the Order of Leopold.

In 1919 he was transferred (because of his "flamingant non-conformism") to the normal school in 's-Gravenbrakel. Lambrechts wrote for seven Flemish magazines.

His last transfer (to Blankenberge) happened in 1921. He taught there until 1925 (when he was 60 years old).

In 1922, together with Emiel Hullebroeck, he founded the music monthly Muziekwarande, the last issue of which was published in December 1931.

From 1923 to 1926 he also taught at the Trade and Language Institute, founded by Jan Baptist Wannyn, on the Savaanstraat in Ghent.

After his death on 13 July 1932, his remains were transferred to his native village in April 1933, where a funerary monument was erected on the municipal cemetery. His friends (including Emiel Hullebroeck) had a memorial plaque placed on this house in 1933. There is also a street named after him in Hoeselt.

== Main works ==
=== Lyrics ===
- De Vlaemsche Zanger (100 songs) (1912, 1925)
- De Duinen (set to music by Armand Preud'homme)
- Het Lied van Pater Callewaert (set to music by Emiel Hullebroeck)
- Omdat ik Vlaming ben (set to music by Maria Matthyssens)
- Het groetend kindje (set to music by August de Boeck)

=== Songbooks ===
- Mijn liedergarve uit Limburg (written in 1888 and published posthumously in 1937)
- Het zingende Vlaanderen (1922)

=== Novels ===
- Uit de Demergouw (1903)
- Het Mirakelfeest (1906)
- Paaseieren (1908)
- Dierennovellen (1910)
- Uit Belgisch Limburg (1911)
- Limburgs leven (1913)
- Het Wingewest (1914)
- Limburgse Beelden (1922)
- Om moeders wil (1925)

=== Poems ===
- Rond het klavier (1901)
- De vrolijke Limburger (1905)
- Mate en minne (1909)
- Kleine keuze (1924)

=== Librettos ===
- Sepp'l, together with Louis De Vriendt, set to music by Emiel Hullebroeck.
- Cupidodictator, set to music by Emiel Hullebroeck.

== Sources ==
- Fernand BONNEURE, Brugge Beschreven. Hoe een stad in nteksten verschijnt, Brussel, Elsevier, 1984.
- Piet DEVOS, Van reuzen tot dwergen. Bibliografie – Vlaamse schrijvers in de 20ste eeuw, Kortrijk, 2007.
