= We Do (film) =

- Directed by: Rebecca Rice
- Release date: September 2015
- Running time: 56m
- Country: United States
- Language: English

We Do is a 56 minute documentary film about marriage equality, produced and directed by independent filmmaker Rebecca Rice. We Do reveals the stories of three LGBT couples, their journeys for legal recognition of their relationships and the impact that the pursuit of marriage equality has had on their lives before and after the Supreme Court ruling on June 26, 2015.

The film features an introduction by LGBT activist and pastor Jim Mitulski, former pastor at Cathedral of Hope (Dallas) who provides the backstory on same-sex unions. We Do then tells the stories of Leta and Anne, with a cameo by their son Jaxson, Mariel and Viviana and Michael and Michael. All three couples had to travel to other states to be legally married even when they knew at the time that their unions would not be legally recognized in the states where they lived.

We Do had its world premiere at AGLIFF, the Austin Gay and Lesbian Film Festival in September 2015. And the film was an official selection of Palm Springs Cinema Diverse and QCinema – the Ft. Worth Gay and Lesbian Film Festival.

We Do was honored with the Shawn A. Moore Award at QCinema and is distributed by CT Media Distribution. We Do is available for educational/classroom streaming through Alexander Street Films Alexander Street, a ProQuest Company and through the Lesflicks streaming service for global Sapphic films.
