= Fernand Verhaegen =

Belgian painter and etcher

Fernand Verhaegen (1883–1975) was a Belgian painter and etcher.

He was born in Marchienne-au-Pont, near Charleroi in Wallonia. He took courses at the Académie Royale des Beaux-Arts from 1900 to 1906 and there became friends with Rik Wouters and Edgard Tytgat. After graduation, he exhibited his works in Belgium and abroad (Biennale of Venice in 1920 and 1922). His style gradually evolved from impressionism and Belgian luminism to a synthetic form of capturing reality. In his later years, he came back to a personal form of impressionism.

Verhaegen specialized in painting Walloon folklore: Carnival of Binche (he was soon recognised as the painter of "the Gilles of Binche"), Doudou of Mons, Giants of Ath, Chinelles of Fosses, Chaudia of Leernes, Pasqueye, and so on. He also created a series of etchings devoted to the folklore in Wallonia. In his book about this artist, Robert Magremanne has named him "the great master of the Walloon folklore". He died in Montigny-le-Tilleul in 1975.

Verhaegen's works are in many museums of Belgium (Antwerp, Brussels, Charleroi, Ixelles, Liège, Mons) and abroad (Genève, Grenoble, Indianapolis).
