= Bernhard Wachtl =

Bernhard Wachtl was an Austrian lithographer whose printing firm was based in Vienna. His work is dated mainly in the latter half of the 19th century and can be traced in Austria as well as in the Mediterranean region.

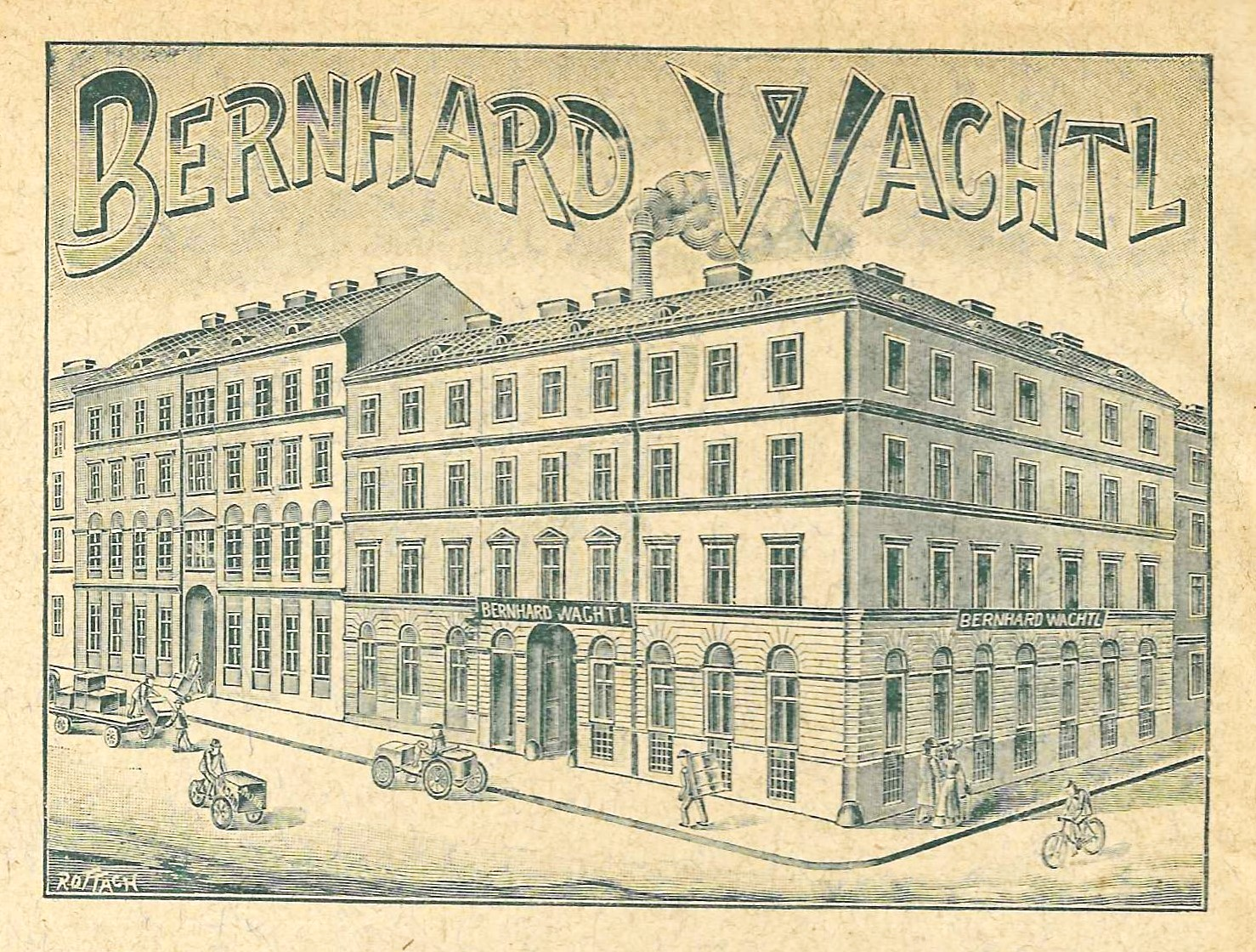
Bernhard Wachtl's Vienna factory in 1903, Kirchberggasse 35–37

Bernhard Wachtl, like the Vienna-based lithographers K. Krziwanek, Trapp & Münch, Turkel & Steiner, Ipop & Turkel, and Eisenschiml, designed and printed the logos of photographic studios at the verso of the cartons supporting 19th century photographic prints. As a lithographer and printer of this specific product, Wachtl formed contracts throughout the Balkans and the East, from Athens to Batoum, Trebizond, Philippople and from Adrianople to Constantinople (Istanbul), Smyrna and Cairo. In Greece, especially, he handled thirty one photographic studios, such as the Rhomaides Brothers, George Moraites, Anastasios Gaziades, the Kanta Sisters, Nikolaos Zepji and Carl Merlin.

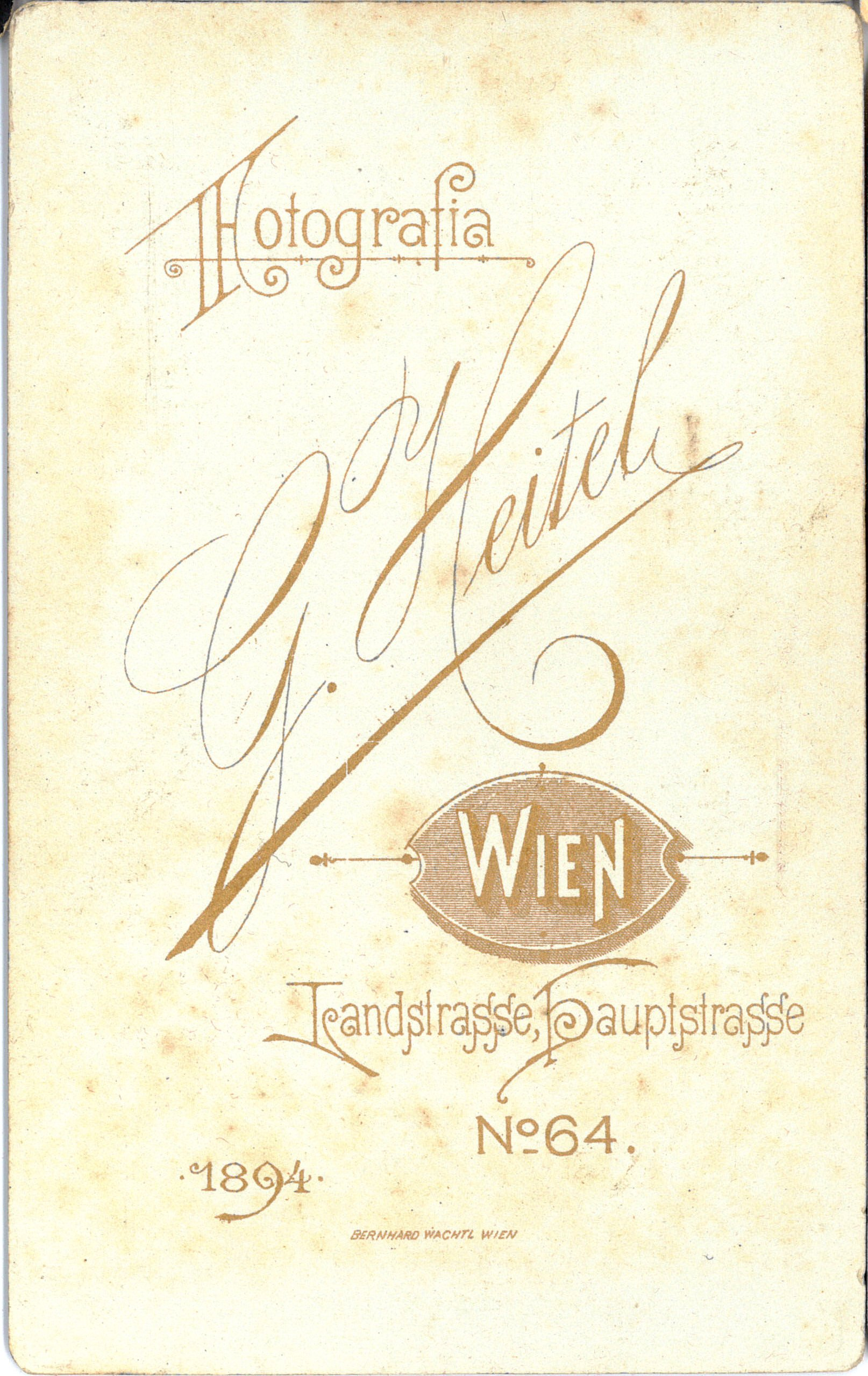
