= Jan Baptist Lambrechts =

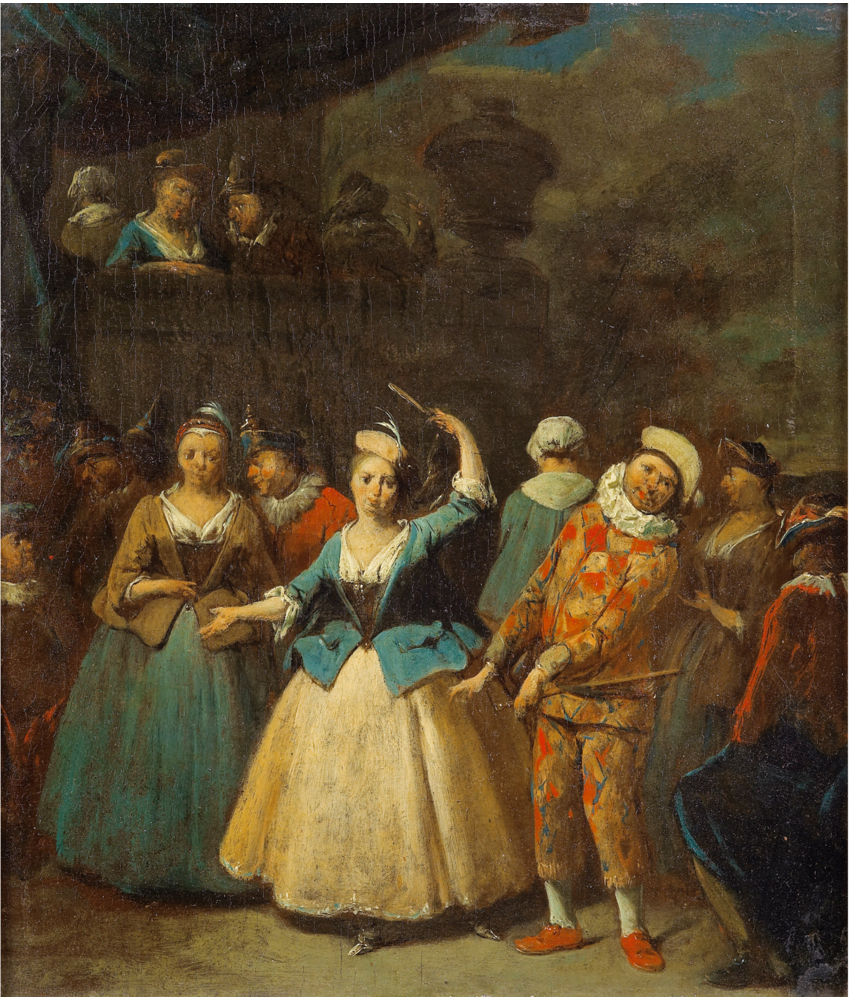
Dance scene with harlequin

Jan Baptist Lambrechts (baptised 28 February 1680 - after 1731) was an 18th-century Flemish painter. He is mainly known for his genre scenes of drinkers, cooks, maids, vegetable salesmen and dancing farmers.

== Life ==
Jan Baptist Lambrechts was born in Antwerp as the son of Jacob and Anna Deckers. His parents died when he was still very young. His stepbrother Jeroom Lambrechts allowed him to develop his artistic skills through self study. In 1703 he left for Lille with the purpose of selling paintings at the annual fair. This was followed by years of travelling.

Jan Baptist Lambrechts only returned to Antwerp in 1709 where he became a master of the local Guild of St Luke.

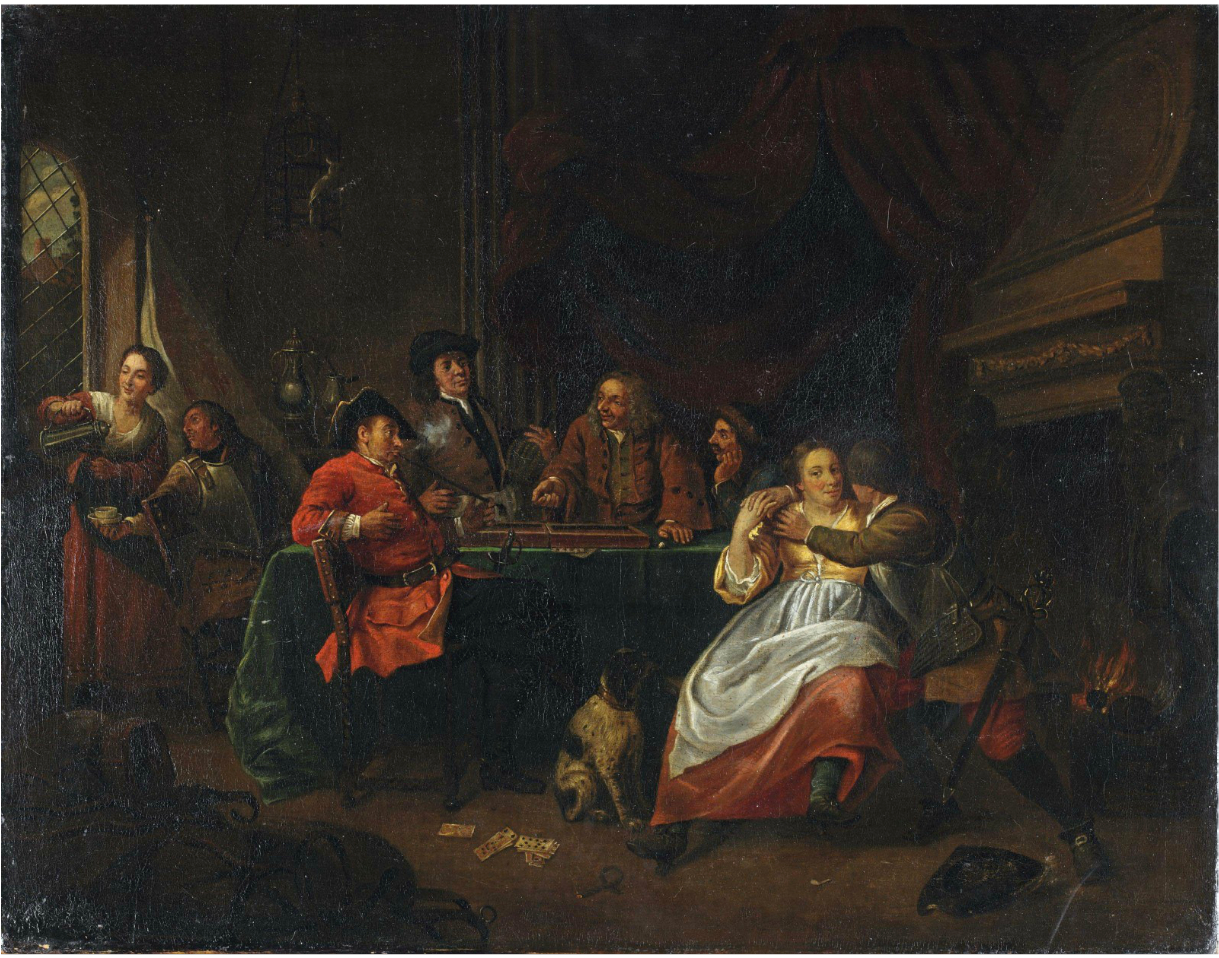
Figures making merry in an interior

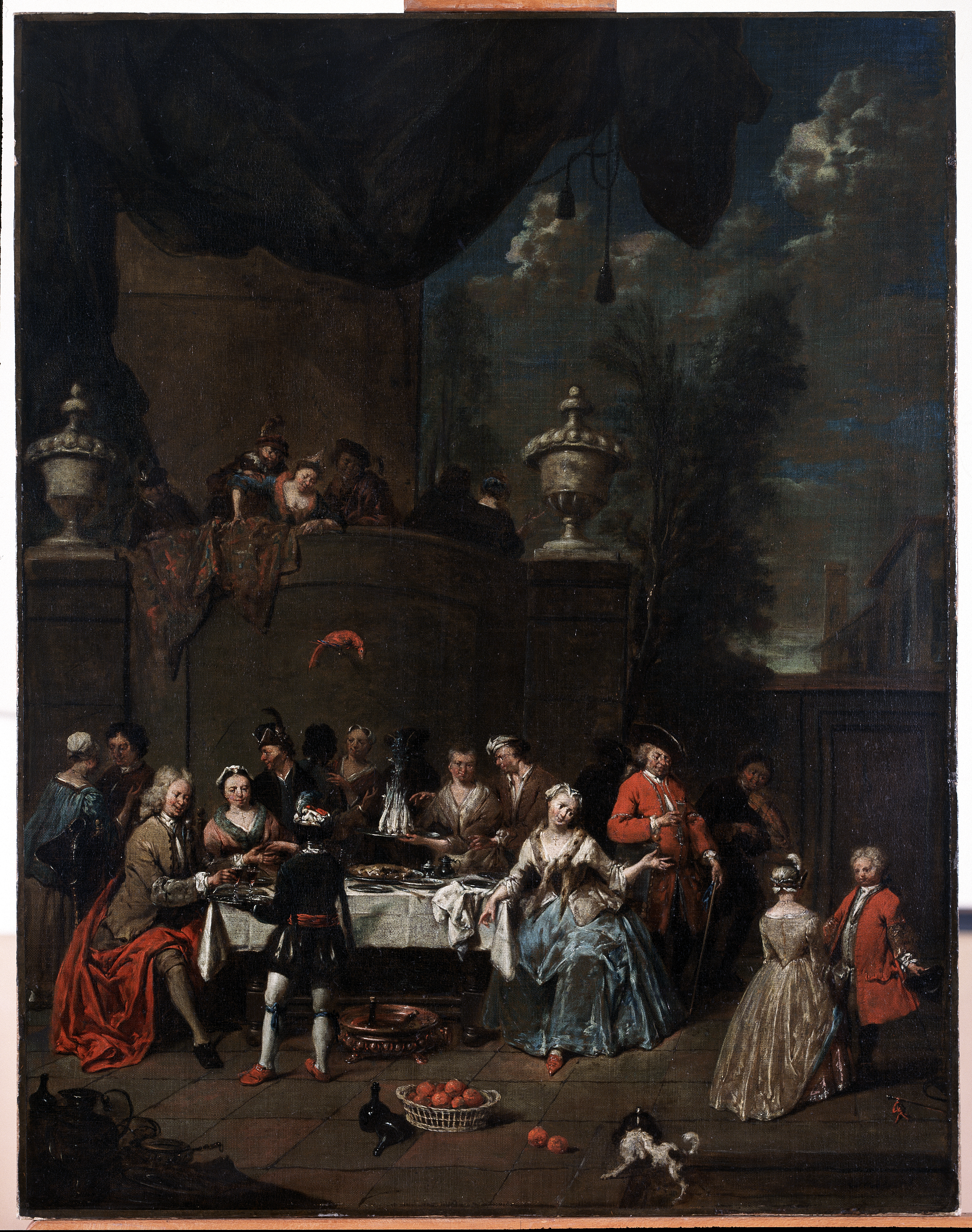
Garden party in front of a castle, Museum of Fine Arts, Ghent

He left his hometown Antwerp in 1731, not long before he died.

== Work ==
Jan Baptist Lambrechts was a genre painter who specialised in tavern scenes and merry company scenes. His preferred motifs included cooks, maids, vegetable salesmen, dancing farmers and drinkers. He also created a singerie depicting a A cat judged by monkeys (At Sotheby's 29 - 30 January 2016 in New York, lot 682).

He was highly appreciated for his fine brushwork and detailed compositions. He was skilled in the rendering of fine fabrics.

Examples of his artistic output can be found in the Uffizi in Florence and the Hermitage and also appear on the international art market.
