= Cezary Paszkowski =

Polish professor, printmaker and painter (born 1948)

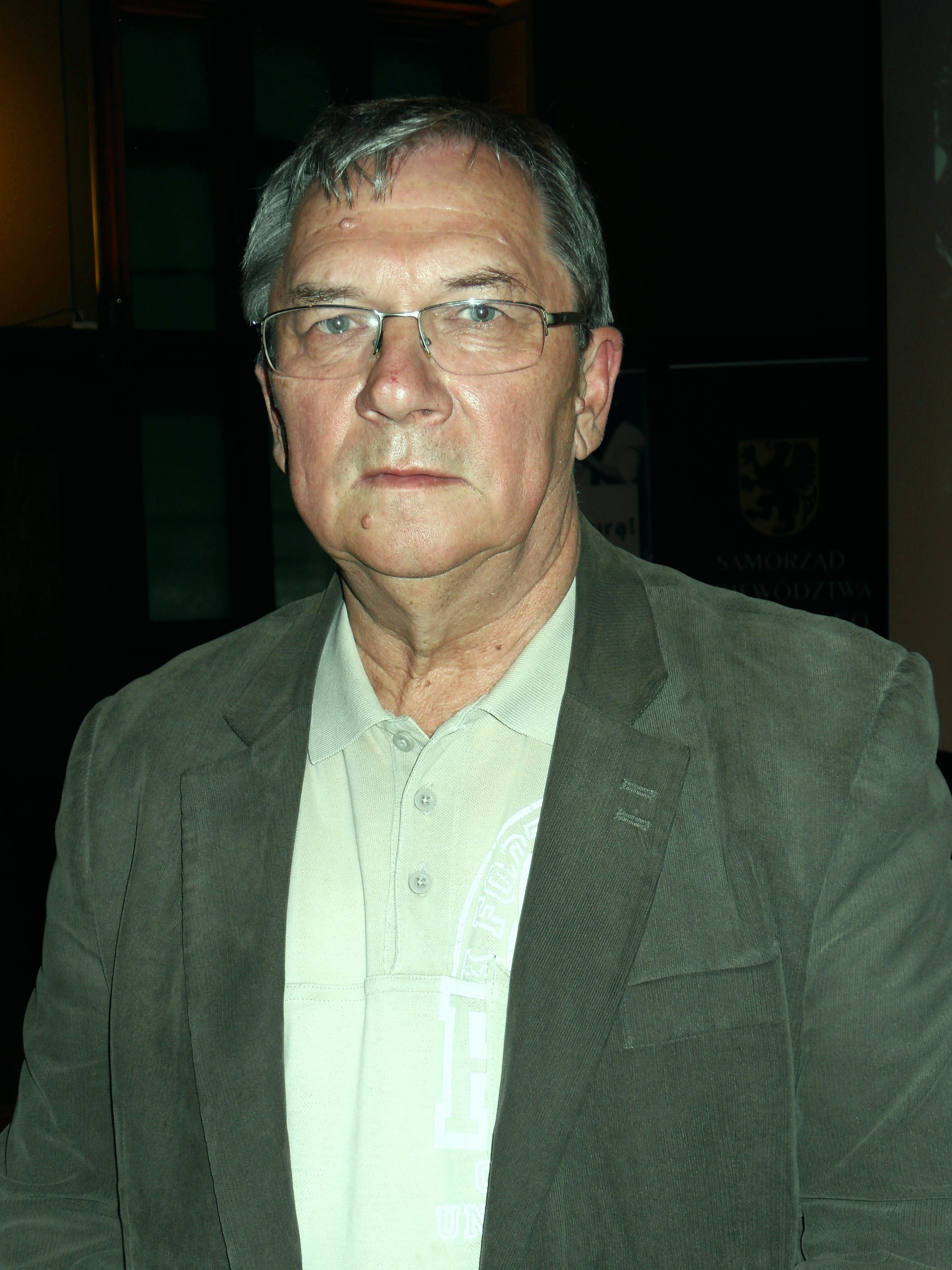
- Paszkowski in 2015
- Born: June 1, 1948 (age 76); Gdańsk, Poland
- Occupation(s): Professor, printmaker, painter

Cezary Paszkowski (born June 1, 1948 in Gdańsk) is a Polish professor, printmaker and painter. Paszkowski lives and works in Gdańsk. He graduated from PWST in Gdańsk in 1973 under Professor Rajmund Pietkiewicz. His works are held in collections in Polish National Museums in Kraków, Gdańsk and Szczecin, and in National Library in Warsaw, in Hermitage Museum collection in Saint Petersburg in Russia, also in museums and private collections in Poland, number of countries in Europe, North and South America, Asia and Australia.
