= Jack McLarty =

American painter

William James (Jack) McLarty (April 24, 1919 – July 10, 2011) was a surrealist painter, printmaker, and teacher of the Pacific Northwest region of the United States.

== History ==
Born in Seattle, Washington, he moved with his family to Portland, Oregon, in 1921. He attended Benson High School in Portland, the Portland Museum Art School, and the American Artists School in New York (1940–1941). After two years in New York he returned to Portland, and in 1945 he began teaching at the Museum Art School where he remained until his retirement.

== Media ==
McLarty worked in paint (oil, and later acrylic), print (lithograph, serigraph, woodcut, wood engraving, etching), and in a few cases stained glass design and sculpture.

== Works in collections ==
- The Amica Collection - Japanese Red
- Pacific University Oregon - Pool at the Marina
- Portland Art Museum - The Descent of Man
- Portland Community College - from Wind and Pines
- Seattle Art Museum - Social Dimension
- Smithsonian American Art Museum 1974.116.13 - Japanese Red
- University of Oregon Jordan Schnitzer Museum of Art - The War Years
- Washington State Art Collection - The Garden
- Willamette University Hallie Ford Museum of Art - Take Off in Grey

== Books and publications ==
- Encounters with the White Train - with Andy Robinson. Ltd. ed. of 500. Portland, OR. Press-22, 1986.
- A Printmaker's World - Portland OR. McLarty's Choice, 1997 ISBN 0-9644916-2-1, 096449163X
- World Watcher-Jack McLarty: 50 Years 1944-1994 (ISBN 0-9644916-0-5) Portland, Or. McLarty's Choice, 1995
- Jack McLarty-Drawings Portland OR. McLarty's Choice 2005 ISBN 0-9644916-7-2, 0-9644916-6-4
- Wind and Pines William Elliott and Noah Brannen Illus. Jack McLarty Portland OR Image Gallery 1977 ISBN 0-918362-00-8

== Teachers and influences ==
- Anton Refregier
- Joseph Solman
- Paul Franck
- Akira Kurosaki
- Junichiro Sekino
- Diego Rivera
- Jose Orozco
