= George Malakov =

George Vasilyevich Malakov (Ukrainian: Георгій Васильович Малаков, Russian: Георгий Васильевич Малаков) (1928–1979) was a Ukrainian artist from Kiev, Ukraine (then the Ukrainian SSR). He specialized in engraving.
