= Articulate Ink =

Printmaking collective in Regina, Saskatchewan, Canada

Coordinates: 50.449443°N 104.609170°W

- Type: Collective
- Industry: Printmaking
- Headquarters: 1843 Hamilton Street; Regina, Saskatchewan; S4P 2B9
- Products: Prints, t-shirts, CD covers etc.
- Website: articulateink.ca

Articulate Ink is a printmaking collective formed in January 2010 in Regina, Saskatchewan, Canada. It was founded by four Fine Arts graduates from the University of Regina.

== History ==
Articulate Ink is a printmaking collective formed in January 2010 by Amber Hanover (Dalton), Caitlin Mullan, and Em Ironstar (formerly Michelle Brownridge), later joined by Karli Jessup. The business plan was developed in a university course. The founders started in a small space and had minimal equipment. Their studio in the Creative City Centre, in a restored heritage building at 1843 Hamilton Street above The Capitol in downtown Regina, opened in the fall of 2011. Articulate Ink used income from early commissions to expand its studio, acquired or was given equipment and received a grant from the Saskatchewan Arts Board.

The Saskatchewan Network for Art Collecting chose Ironstar, Hanover, Jessup and Mullan as their Artist of the Month for February 2012. In 2013 Articulate Ink moved from the top floor of the Creative City Centre to a larger space on the second floor more suitable for its workshops and activities. As of 2015, Articulate Ink was the centre's largest tenant. Articulate Ink joined with Ink Slab Printmakers of Saskatoon to form the Saskatchewan Printmaker's Association. Articulate Ink was a finalist in 2015 for the Saskatchewan Young Professionals & Entrepreneurs (SYPE) Volta Award for a young entrepreneur or team that has demonstrated operating success in Saskatchewan.

== Activities ==
Articulate Ink produces hand-made merchandise for local musicians such as Library Voices. Products for musicians include DVD/CD covers, festival posters and T-shirts. The equipment includes a 1919 Chandler & Price letterpress weighing 1,500 pounds (680 kg), which took a year and a half to put into working condition. There are less than 50 print shops in the US with machines like this. The collective members hoped to take advantage of a recent vogue for letterpress cards, invitations and stationery. The collective gives workshops in block printing, etching, letterpress, and silk screening. Thus in September 2015 Articulate Ink let members of the public make screen-printed T-shirts as part of the Culture Days Saskatchewan events. The collective has participated in solo and group exhibitions of their work.

== Members ==
Brownridge received a Bachelor of Fine Arts Degree in Printmaking from the University of Regina in 2010. She was administrative assistant at the Organization of Saskatchewan Arts Councils (OSAC), then Communications Coordinator at SaskCulture. She is resident curator at the Hague Gallery in Regina. She combines contemporary and traditional printing techniques in her work. She has exhibited in Saskatchewan, Miami, Chicago, Seattle, and Buffalo.

Dalton studied drawing at Medicine Hat College from 1999 to 2001. She later majored in Print Media at the University of Regina, and gained a Bachelor of Fine Arts in 2010. She works in silkscreen, intaglio, and lithograph. Her work has been exhibited in Regina, Buffalo, New York and Seattle.

Karli Jessup graduated from the University of Regina with a Bachelor of Fine Arts in 2011. She uses screenprinting, linocuts, and letterpress. She often incorporates text in her work, which may be derived from political slogans and advertisements. She had a solo exhibition at the Hague Gallery in Regina in fall of 2011. Karli Jessup has collaborated with poet Shayna Stock to create prints that combine images of downtown Regina with poetry by Stock.

Caitlin Mullan completed her Bachelor of Fine Arts in Print Media at the University of Regina in 2011. She has worked with the Art Gallery of Regina, the Fifth Parallel Gallery, and the Royal Saskatchewan Museum. Her prints explore memory, history, and interconnectivity. Her silkscreen prints incorporate a lot of vintage materials.

== Selected exhibitions ==
2012 January–March. Press: The Work of Articulate Ink, Regina Public Library, Dunlop Art Gallery.
2013 August–September Proof Void Gallery, Saskatoon
2015 May–June. Repetition, with Ink Slab Printmakers and Studio 4417. Humboldt & District Museum & Gallery, Humboldt.
2015 July–August. Repetition, with Ink Slab Printmakers and Studio 4417. Dean Art Gallery, Yorkton.
2016 January. Surface Beauty, Estevan Art Gallery and Museum.

== Sources ==
- A Brief History of Articulate Ink..., Articulate Ink, archived from the original on 2016-03-11
- Amber Andersen (2016), Gallery 1 . Surface Beauty . Articulate Ink, Estevan Art Gallery, archived from the original on 2016-03-13
- Amber Dalton, Saskatchewan NAC
- Articulate Ink, Saskatchewan NAC
- Articulate Ink, Void Gallery
- Ashley Martin (25 August 2011), "Print Collective saving a piece of Regina history", Regina Leader-Post, Regina
- Ashley Martin (3 December 2013), "Old fashioned printing sees a revival in the province", The StarPhoenix, Saskatoon
- Brandy Exner (14 March 2012), "Articulate Ink", SaskMusic
- Caitlin Mullan, Saskatchewan NAC
- Karli Jessup, Saskatchewan NAC
- M. E. Powell (Spring–Summer 2013), "The fine art of the business of arts" (PDF), Degrees, 25 (1), University of Regina
- Marian, Creative City Centre (20 September 2015), September 27 – T-Shirt Printing with Articulate Ink!
- Michelle Brownridge, Saskatchewan NAC
- Newsletter (PDF), Humboldt & District Museum & Gallery, Winter 2015
- "Our New Logo", 2011 Annual Report (PDF), Mann Art Gallery, archived from the original (PDF) on 2012-07-22
- Repetition, Dean Art Gallery
- Sabrina Cataldo (24 September 2015), "Accessible art found at Creative City Centre", Tourism Regina, archived from the original on 13 March 2016
- Sam Macdonald (22 January 2016), "Articulate Ink grows with interest in printmaking", Estevan Lifestyles, Glacier Community Media
- "Start the presses!", 2011-2012 Annual Report (PDF), Saskatchewan Arts Board
- The Morning Edition (16 December 2015), "Winter in downtown Regina inspires spoken word poetry", CBC News
- Volta Award, Saskatchewan Young Professionals & Entrepreneurs (SYPE), archived from the original on 2016-03-13
