= Walter Lambrecht =

Walter R. L. Lambrecht (born 1955) is a Belgian physicist.

Born in Aalst, Belgium, in 1955, Lambrecht attended the University of Ghent, where he earned a Lic. Sc. and a Dr. Sc. in 1977 and 1980, respectively. He is a professor at Case Western Reserve University. In 2002, Lambrecht was elected a fellow of the American Physical Society, "[f]or his seminal contributions to a better understanding of the electronic structure and linear and nonlinear optical properties of semiconductors, in particular wide band gap semiconductors, chalcopyrites and rare-earth pnictides".
