= Paul Lambrichts =

Belgian footballer

Personal information
- Full name: Paul Raymond Lambrichts
- Date of birth: 16 October 1954
- Place of birth: Leut, Belgium
- Height: 1.81 m (5 ft 11 in)
- Position: Defender

Senior career*
Years	Team	Apps	(Gls)
1975–1978	Patro Eisden		
1978–1982	KFC Winterslag		
1982–1988	KSK Beveren		
1988–1989	Standard Liège		
1990	KSK Beveren		
1990–1993	VV Overpelt-Fabriek		

International career
1984	Belgium	5	(0)
- * Club domestic league appearances and goals

Paul Lambrichts (born 16 October 1954, Lanklaar) is a retired Belgian footballer.

During his career he played for Lanklaar V.V., Patro-Eisden, F.C. Winterslag, K.S.K. Beveren, R. Standard de Liège and K.V.V. Overpelt. He earned 5 caps for the Belgium national football team, and participated in UEFA Euro 1984.
