= Miriam Mörsel Nathan =

American poet

- Born: Miriam Mörsel Nathan; 1947 (age 78–79); Dominican Republic
- Education: George Washington University
- Style: drawings, prints and paintings
- Movement: Abstract
- Website: www.miriammorselnathan.com

Miriam Mörsel Nathan is an American visual artist. Her work is abstract and process based. Through the mediums of drawing and printing, the use of repetition and a combination of materials, she seeks to connect disparate elements and fragments in her works on paper. The driving force behind the work is to make whole what is not whole at all. She is also a published poet.

== Early life and education ==
Mörsel Nathan was born in 1947 in the Dominican Republic to Czech parents. In the late 1940s, they immigrated to Richmond, Virginia, where Mörsel Nathan spent her childhood. She received a Bachelor of Arts (1969) and a Master of Arts (1971) from The George Washington University. She attended the Corcoran College of Art & Design; New York Studio School of Drawing, Painting & Sculpture; and Fundación CIEC, Centro Internacional de la Estampa Contemporánea, Betanzos, La Coruña, Spain.

== Career ==
Mörsel Nathan has had multiple solo exhibitions including I First Saw the World Through a Mosquito Net… ^{[2]} at the BBLA Gallery, Bohemian National Hall, in New York City (2014) and Memory of a time I did not know… ^{[3]} at the Ann Loeb Bronfman Gallery in Washington, D.C. (2010). She has been in numerous group shows in galleries including DC Arts Center (DCAC) in Washington, DC and Betty Mae Kramer Gallery, in Maryland.

Her commissioned work was exhibited for the concert performance of the opera Lost Childhood ^{[4]} at the Music Center at Strathmore, North Bethesda, Maryland (2013). Mörsel Nathan’s work was the cover image for Into the Cyclorama, the collection of poems by Annie Kim, winner of the 2015 Michael Waters Poetry Prize. Her work was the cover art for the Conductor’s score for the opera Lost Childhood.

Her poetry and essays have appeared in such publications as Gargoyle, Hampden-Sydney Poetry Review, Sojourner: The Women’s Forum; Arts & Letters: Journal of Contemporary Culture, The Bitter Oleander, Poet Lore and Daughters of Absence (Capital Books, 2000). She has read her work at The Knitting Factory, The Jewish Museum, NY, the Smithsonian Institution, the U.S. Holocaust Memorial Museum, among other venues.

Co-founder of The Washington Jewish Film Festival with Aviva Kempner, Mörsel Nathan was director of the Festival for ten years and Director of the Morris Cafritz Center for the Arts for fifteen years.

== Fellowships, awards and commissions ==
- 2015 Visual Arts RoundUp Award, Montgomery County Arts & Humanities Council
- 2015, 2013, 2008, 2006, 2005 Fellowships in Painting, Virginia Center for the Creative Arts
- 2013, Cover art for Generation After, Inc. brochure
- 2010 Individual Artist Grant, Montgomery County Arts & Humanities Council
- 2009 Morris and Gwendolyn Cafritz Foundation Award in the Visual Arts, Virginia Center for Creative Arts
- 2007 Commission to create images for score cover and posters for the opera Lost Childhood, by composer Janice Hamer with libretto by poet Mary Azrael
- 2001, 2002 Fellowships in Poetry, Virginia Center for the Creative Arts

== Personal life ==
Nathan lives outside Washington DC with her husband.
