= Sol Wilson =

Polish-American painter (1893–1974)

Sol Wilson (1893 – November 23, 1974) was a Polish-born American painter. His work is in the collections of the Metropolitan Museum of Art, the National Gallery of Art, the Rochester Institute of Technology, the Smithsonian American Art Museum, and the Whitney Museum of American Art.
