= Lynn Shaler =

American artist (born 1955)

Lynn Shaler (born 1955) is an American artist known for her color aquatint etchings. Many of her works feature locations in the city of Paris. Early subjects often included objects such as doorknobs, envelopes, theater exits, and a pair of shoes. Later and more recent subjects often include architectural details or interior views opening onto an exterior scene. Many of her works also feature a dog, a cat, umbrella(s), and/or a lady in a red/pink coat. The majority of her works are made with multiple plates, and many are, at least in part, hand-colored.

== Biography ==
Lynn Shaler studied printmaking at the University of Michigan and subsequently received a Master of Fine Arts degree from the Pratt Institute. In 1984, Shaler won a Fulbright scholarship to pursue postgraduate studies at Atelier 17 in Paris. She has produced more than 200 etchings since 1975. Her work can be found in collections at the Bibliothèque nationale de France (Paris), the Metropolitan Museum of Art (New York), the Library of Congress (Washington D.C.), and the Victoria and Albert Museum (London) – see below for a more comprehensive list. Shaler has lived in Paris since 1988.

== Solo exhibitions ==
- 2018: Across the Decades, Gallery 71, New York, NY
- 2009: Lynn Shaler: Etchings of Paris, Gallery 71, New York, NY
- 2007: Gallery 71, New York, NY
- 2007: Kendall Gallery, Wellfleet, MA
- 2006: Jacob Fanning Gallery, Wellfleet, MA
- 2005: Jacob Fanning Gallery, Wellfleet, MA
- 2005: Gallery 71, New York, NY
- 2004: Jacob Fanning Gallery, Wellfleet, MA
- 2002: Gallery 71, New York, NY
- 2002: Jacob Fanning Gallery, Wellfleet, MA
- 2000: Esmay Fine Art, Rochester, NY
- 2000: Jacob Fanning Gallery, Wellfleet, MA
- 2000: Galerie Bréheret, Paris
- 1999: Gallery 71, New York, NY
- 1998: Esmay Fine Art, Rochester, NY
- 1998: Jacob Fanning Gallery, Wellfleet, MA
- 1998: Legacy Gallery, Newton, PA
- 1997: Gallery 71, New York, NY
- 1996: Shoestring Gallery, Rochester, NY
- 1996: Galerie Bréheret, Paris
- 1996: Jacob Fanning Gallery, Wellfleet, MA
- 1995: Arnold Klein Gallery, Royal Oak, MI
- 1994: Gallery 71, New York, NY
- 1994: Shoestring Gallery, Rochester, NY
- 1993: Galerie Bréheret, Paris
- 1993: Galerie Champs Bleus, Paris
- 1992: Galerie Corot, Paris
- 1992: Newmark Gallery, New York, NY
- 1992: Arnold Klein Gallery, Royal Oak, MI
- 1992: Shoestring Gallery, Rochester, NY
- 1991: Galerie Corot, Paris
- 1990: Cultural Center of Ville d'Avray, France
- 1990: Galerie Corot, Paris
- 1990: Bunting Gallery, Ferndale, MI
- 1989: Galerie Angle Aigu, Brussels, Belgium
- 1989: Cité internationale des arts, Paris
- 1989: Claude Gallery, Eastchester, NY
- 1988: Galerie La Verrièe, Paris
- 1987: Claude Gallery, Eastchester, NY
- 1987: Schweyer/Galdo Galleries, Pontiac, MI

== Collections ==
The following collections contain Lynn Shaler's work:

- American Church in Paris
- Art Complex Museum, MA
- Bibliothèque Nationale de France, Paris
- Brooklyn Museum, NY
- Chemical Bank, Rochester, NY
- Detroit Institute of Arts
- Dulin Gallery of Art, TN
- Exxon Corporation, NY
- French Embassy, Madrid
- French Embassy, Santo Domingo
- Huntsville Museum of Art, Huntsville, AL
- International Bankers France, Paris
- International Graphics Arts Foundation, CT
- Kmart Corporation, Troy, MI
- Library of Congress, Washington D.C.
- Mainichi Newspapers, Paris
- Metropolitan Museum of Art, NY
- Michigan Blue Cross/Blue Shield
- Museum of Saint-Maur, France
- Newark Public Library, NJ
- New York Public Library, NY
- Oakland University, Rochester, MI
- Pratt Institute, NY
- State University at Potsdam, NY
- Trenton State College, NJ
- Victoria and Albert Museum, London

== Awards ==
- 2014: The Kiyoshi Hasegawa Prize, Fondation Taylor, Paris.
- 2011: Michel Ciry Prize.
- 2003: The Marvin Bolotsky Purchase Prize, The International Miniature Print Exhibition, Center for Contemporary Printmaking, Norwalk, CT
- 1994: First Prize – 3rd Biennial of Graphics, Museum of St. Maur, France
- 1992: Third Prize – 2nd Biennial of Graphics, Museum of St. Maur, France
- 1991: Jurors Award – Boston Printmakers 19th Annual Members Show, Art Complex Museum, Duxbury, MA
- 1985: Henry B. Shope Award – 60th National Exhibition, Society of American Graphic Artists, NY
- 1984: William H. Leavin Prize – 159th National Exhibition, National Academy of Design, NY
- 1983: Professional Award – Colorprint U.S.A., Texas Tech University, Lubbock, TX
- 1983: Associated American Artists Purchase Prize, NY
- 1983: Jurors Mention Prize – Rockford College Biennial Print Exhibition
- 1982: Purchase Prize – Prints U.S.A., Pratt Graphics Center, NY
- 1982: Purchase Prize – National Print Exhibition, Trenton State College
- 1982: Gladys Mock Memorial Award – 59th National Print Exhibition, Society of American Graphic Artists, NY
- 1981: Purchase Prize – 15th National Dulin Print Exhibition, TN
- 1981: Certificate of Merit – 156th Annual Exhibition, National Academy of Design, NY
- 1980: Purchase Prize – 15th National Print Exhibition, State Univ. of Potsdam, NY
- 1981: Murray Roth Memorial Award – 38th Annual Audubon Artists Exhibition, NY
- 1979: Dr. & Mrs. Paul A. Bradlow Purchase Prize – 7th International Miniature Print Competition, Pratt Graphics Center, NY
