= Mark Rowden =

Australian printmaker (born 1979)

Mark Rowden (born in 1979) is an Australian printmaker.

== Training ==
Rowden was born in Margate, England and received a Bachelor of Arts at the National Art School, Sydney. He trained and worked under Master Printer Diana Davidson at Whaling Road studios, one of Sydney's oldest fine art editioning studios. He printed the first ever prints of Adam Cullen and Mclean Edwards, he worked with some notable artist Charles Blackman, Martin Sharp & Peter Kingston

== Exhibitions ==
He has shown throughout sydney and Melbourne, and is represented by PG gallery, Melbourne.
