= Wedo Georgetti =

American artist (1911–2005)

Guido "Wedo" Georgetti (May 18, 1911 – December 12, 2005) was an American painter, etcher, lithographer and sculptor.

== Biography ==
He was born in Marche, Italy, and came to the United States in 1913 when he turned two. Wedo Georgetti spent many years travelling as a merchant seaman before he gained significant recognition as an artist. He also studied art in New York City. It is believed that he used experiences and images from his extensive travels as inspiration for his art. Although in the 1940s Georgetti was well known for his watercolor art and prints, Georgetti was blacklisted by the government during the McCarthy era. He was not convicted, but it shed a negative light on his art, making it harder for him to sell his works. Despite this, Georgetti kept pursuing his artistic efforts, primarily painting in oils and watercolor, and gave his unsold works to his friends and family. Georgetti's work is in the collection of the National Gallery of Art.

Georgetti died at his home in Sausalito, California on December 12, 2005.
