= Ynez Johnston =

American painter (1920–2019)

- Born: Frances Ynez Johnston; May 12, 1920; Berkeley, California, U.S.
- Died: March 13, 2019 (aged 98); Los Angeles, California, U.S.
- Other names: Inez Johnson, Ynez Berry, Ynez Johnston Keklak
- Education: University of California, Berkeley
- Years active: 1943–2010
- Known for: Painting, sculpture
- Spouse: John Berry (m. 1960–2000; d.)
- Awards: Guggenheim Fellowship (1952)
- Website: https://www.ynezjohnston.com/

Ynez Johnston (May 12, 1920 – March 13, 2019) was an American painter, sculptor, printmaker, and educator. Known for her work in painting, printmaking, and mixed media, Johnston was particularly inspired by Byzantine art, as well as Tibetan, Indian, Mexican, and Nepalese art from her extensive travels. Johnston was based in the San Francisco Bay Area in early life, and moved to Los Angeles in 1949.

== Early life ==
Frances Ynez Johnston was born on May 12, 1920, in Berkeley, California. She attended University of California, Berkeley, where she studied with artists John Haley, Ward Lockwood, Earle Loran, and Margaret Peterson, as well as with Worth Ryder, who taught art history. She earned her bachelor of fine arts in 1941.

Johnston received Berkeley's Bertha Taussig Memorial Award in 1941, which enabled her to travel to Mexico, where she lived and worked until 1943. She would continue to travel around the world over the course of her life, including to Nepal, Spain, India, Cambodia, and Italy, and her subsequent works reflect a myriad of international artistic traditions. Johnston's first solo exhibition was held at the San Francisco Museum of Art (now SFMOMA) in 1943, and she earned her masters of fine arts from Berkeley in 1947.

== Career ==
=== Artistic practice ===
==== Methods ====
Johnston's visual language was inspired by both modern and ancient art, and her mixed-media compositions often center on ambiguous, semi-abstract figures, plants, animals, and architectural forms in mythical landscapes. Johnston primarily worked in painting, and incised calligraphic lines on the surface of her works. Johnston's printmaking practice included intaglio, woodblock printing, and lithography. Of her works, Johnston wrote:

Painting is for me like a voyage into oceans known and unknown, depths and distances ultimately unfathomable. The end of the voyage is never what one might have anticipated.

Johnston also created collaborative wood sculptures with her husband, John Berry, and created ceramics with Adam Mekler.

==== Exhibitions ====
Johnston exhibited with different Los Angeles galleries between 1947 and 1949, and she moved to Los Angeles in 1949. In 1950, Johnston was included in a juried exhibition, curated by Andrew C. Ritchie, at the Los Angeles County Museum of Art, where her etching won first prize. She was invited by Ritchie as one of three artists to be included in a 1950-1951 New Talent exhibition at the Museum of Modern Art in New York, the first of many presentations of her work on the East Coast. In 1952, Johnston's work was exhibited as the first solo exhibition at the new Paul Kantor Gallery, founded by Paul and Jo Kantor, where she would continue to show consistently until the mid-1960s. Johnston produced prints through Tamarind Lithography Workshop in 1965.

Of Johnston's 1955 exhibition at the Legion of Honor, critic Alfred Frankenstein wrote:

“Ynez Johnston [is] an artist who has mastered a fabulous, very personal, very important, and all but indescribable style. Miss Johnston fuses dream and improvisation...in the infinite, unbelievably minute elaboration of her design, which often takes on an almost microscopic character. Her scale can be very deceptive, however; once it entraps the eye it leads it through extraordinary shifts and reversals, so that the microscopic is revealed as immense vanishes into the small...”

Johnson continued to exhibit her work nationally and internationally over the course of her life, including in Mexico, the United Kingdom, and Japan. Johnston also received a commission from the Graphic Arts Council of the Los Angeles County Museum of Art in 1981, and she was an artist in residence at Fullerton College in 1982.

Retrospectives of Johnston's work were held at Weiner Gallery in New York in 1977, the Fresno Art Museum in 1992, the Bakersfield Art Museum in 1994, the Kennedy Museum of American Art in Ohio in 1997, and in 2021 at the Sonoma Valley Museum of Art.

=== Teaching career ===
Johnston started teaching art classes at various universities and colleges in 1950 and ended teaching in 1980. She began at University of California, Berkeley (1950–1951) and then continued her teaching career at Colorado Springs Fine Art Center (1954–1955), Chouinard Art Institute (1956), California State College (1966–1967, 1969, 1973), the University of Jerusalem (1967), and Otis Art Institute of Parsons School of Design (1978–1980).

== Personal life ==
In 1960, Johnston married novelist and poet, John Berry (1915-2000), whom she met while on a Huntington Hartford Foundation residency grant several years prior. The couple collaborated on numerous sculptural works over the decades, and their travels to Nepal, Cambodia, and Japan in 1964–1965 were supported by Berry's Fulbright grant to India. Johnston would form enduring friendships with her classmate Leonard Edmondson, whose printing press she used upon her move to Los Angeles, as well as a number of fellow Southern California artists, including June Wayne, Lee Mullican, and Emerson Woelffer.

== Awards ==
Johnston was awarded a Guggenheim Fellowship in 1952 for fine art, which allowed her travel to Italy. In 1955–1956 she was awarded the Louis Comfort Tiffany Foundation grant for painting and printmaking. In 1959, Johnston was named a Los Angeles Times "Woman of the Year," alongside Edith Head and Harriet Nelson. Johnston was awarded the National Endowment for the Arts (NEA) grant in 1976 and 1986.

== Legacy ==
Johnston's work is featured in over sixty museum collections, including the Museum of Modern Art (MoMA), the Metropolitan Museum of Art, the Smithsonian American Art Museum, the Art Institute of Chicago, the Los Angeles County Museum of Art (LACMA), the Brooklyn Museum, the National Gallery of Art, the Philadelphia Museum of Art, the Detroit Institute of Arts, the Wadsworth Athenaeum, the San Francisco Museum of Modern Art, and the Boston Museum of Fine Arts, among others.

Johnston died on March 13, 2019 in Los Angeles. The estate of Ynez Johnston is represented by Louis Stern Fine Arts, who are preparing to present a major retrospective exhibition in 2026, accompanied by an extensive catalogue.

== Works ==
Works by Ynez Johnston

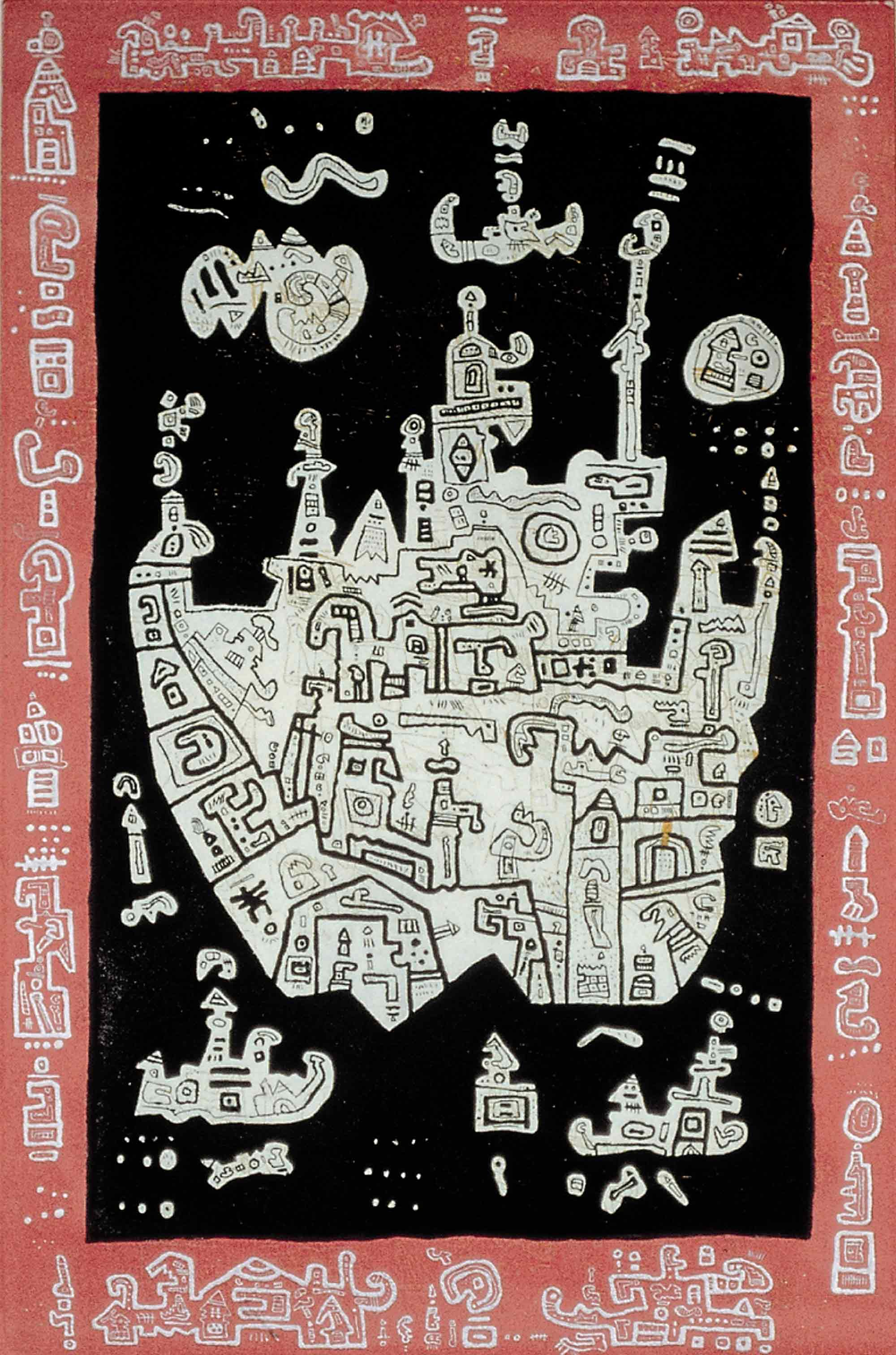
"Voyage of the Mandarins" (1982), Etching

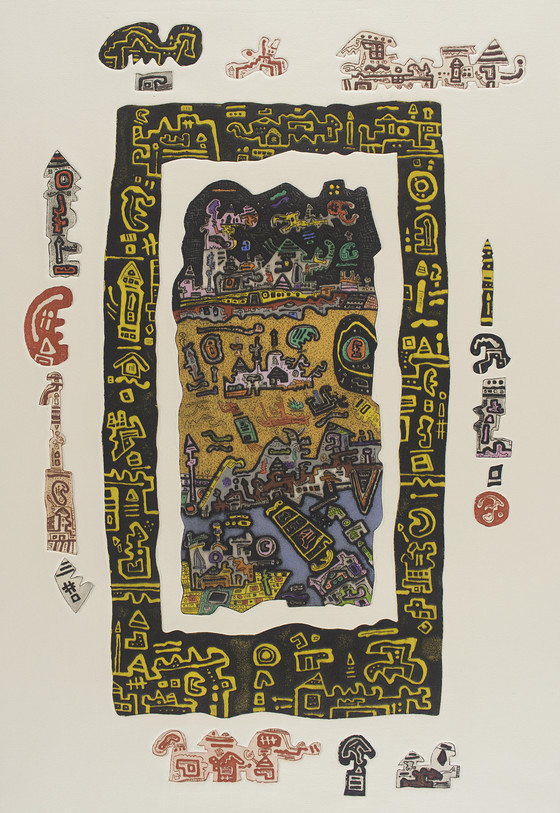
"The Secret Landscape"

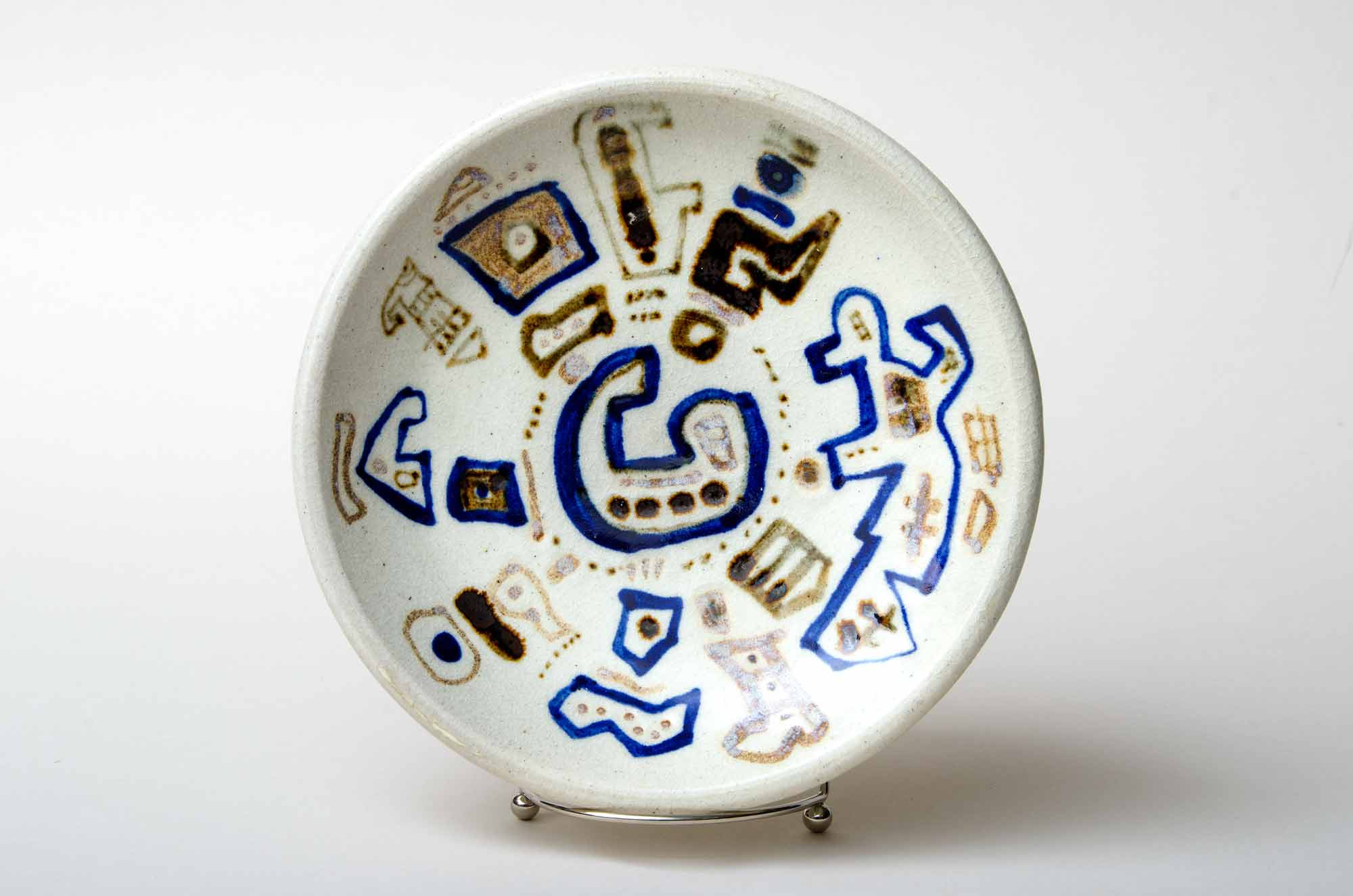
Untitled (plate)

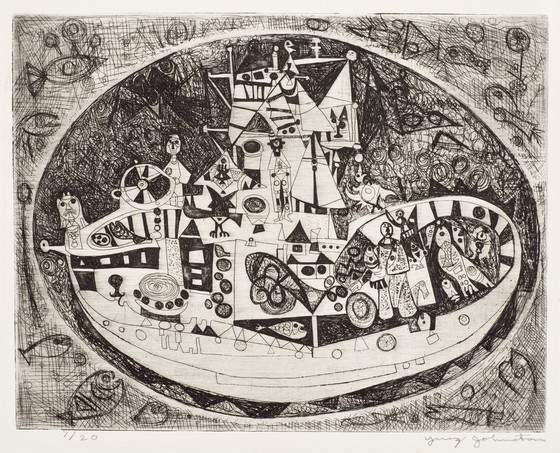
"Ship and Storm" (1949), etching
