= Lynton Richards Kistler =

American lithographer (1897–1993)

- Born: August 30, 1897; Los Angeles, California, U.S.
- Died: November 9, 1993 (aged 96); Laguna Hills, California, U.S.
- Occupation: master printmaker
- Years active: 1920s–1976
- Known for: lithography
- Spouses: Naomi Tucker, Lelah O. Morris
- Children: 1
- Father: William A. Kistler

Lynton Richards Kistler (1897–1993) was an American master printmaker, small book publisher, and author. He became known as the best stone lithographer in the United States, at the peak of his career in 1950s. He owned and operated the lithography press, Kistler of Los Angeles.

== Biography ==
Lynton Richards Kistler was born August 30, 1897, in Los Angeles, California. He is descended on his paternal side from northern Switzerland and southern Germany people who had settled in Kistler Valley in Pennsylvania, and his maternal side was from England. His father, William A. Kistler, had owned Kistler Printing and Lithography, a Los Angeles-based lithography and letterpress shop, for 30 years. He attended Hollywood High School and Manual Arts High School. During World War I, he served in the United States Army (1917 to 1918).

In the late 1920s, Kistler learned lithography in this father's shop. Early in his career he befriended and worked with Merle Armitage, and artists Jean Charlot and Edward Weston. In 1936, his father sold the printshop, and Kistler started practicing lithography in the garage and briefly opened a business. In 1941, Kistler moved to New York City to work in printmaking at Blanchard Press.

In 1945, Kistler moved back to Los Angeles and started printing for a larger group of artists at Kistler of Los Angeles. Starting in 1948, he worked with printmaker June Wayne, and inspired her to open Tamarind Lithography Workshop (now Tamarind Institute). Printmakers Joe Funk and Jan Stussy also worked in the Kistler print workshop. He stopped printing lithography in 1952 after experiencing an allergic reaction to the chemicals.

Kistler worked with many artists over the years, including Millard Sheets, Wayne Thiebaud, Lorser Feitelson, Helen Lundeberg, Beatrice Wood, Hans Burkhardt, Eugene Berman, Clinton Adams, Palmer Schoppe, and Joe Mugnaini.

He bought a commercial printing plant at 1653 West Temple Street in Los Angeles, which he held until 1970. From 1970 to 1976, until his retirement, he owned a larger commercial printing plant.

Kistler taught printmaking at UCLA Extension for many years.

He died on November 9, 1993, in Laguna Hills, California, at the age of 96.

== Collections ==
Kistler's work is in public museum collections, including:

- Art Institute of Chicago,
- British Museum,
- Des Moines Art Center,
- Fine Arts Museums of San Francisco,
- Hammer Museum,
- Library of Congress,
- Los Angeles County Museum of Art,
- Metropolitan Museum of Art,
- Museum of Fine Arts, Boston,
- National Gallery of Art,
- Nelson Atkins Museum of Art,
- New Mexico Museum of Art,
- Philadelphia Museum of Art,
- Richardson Memorial Library, Saint Louis Art Museum,
- Syracuse University,
- University of San Diego,

== Bibliography ==
- Kistler, Lynton R. (1950). How to Make a Lithograph: The Art of Stone Lithography.
