= Joe Funk =

American artist (c. 1914 – 1981)

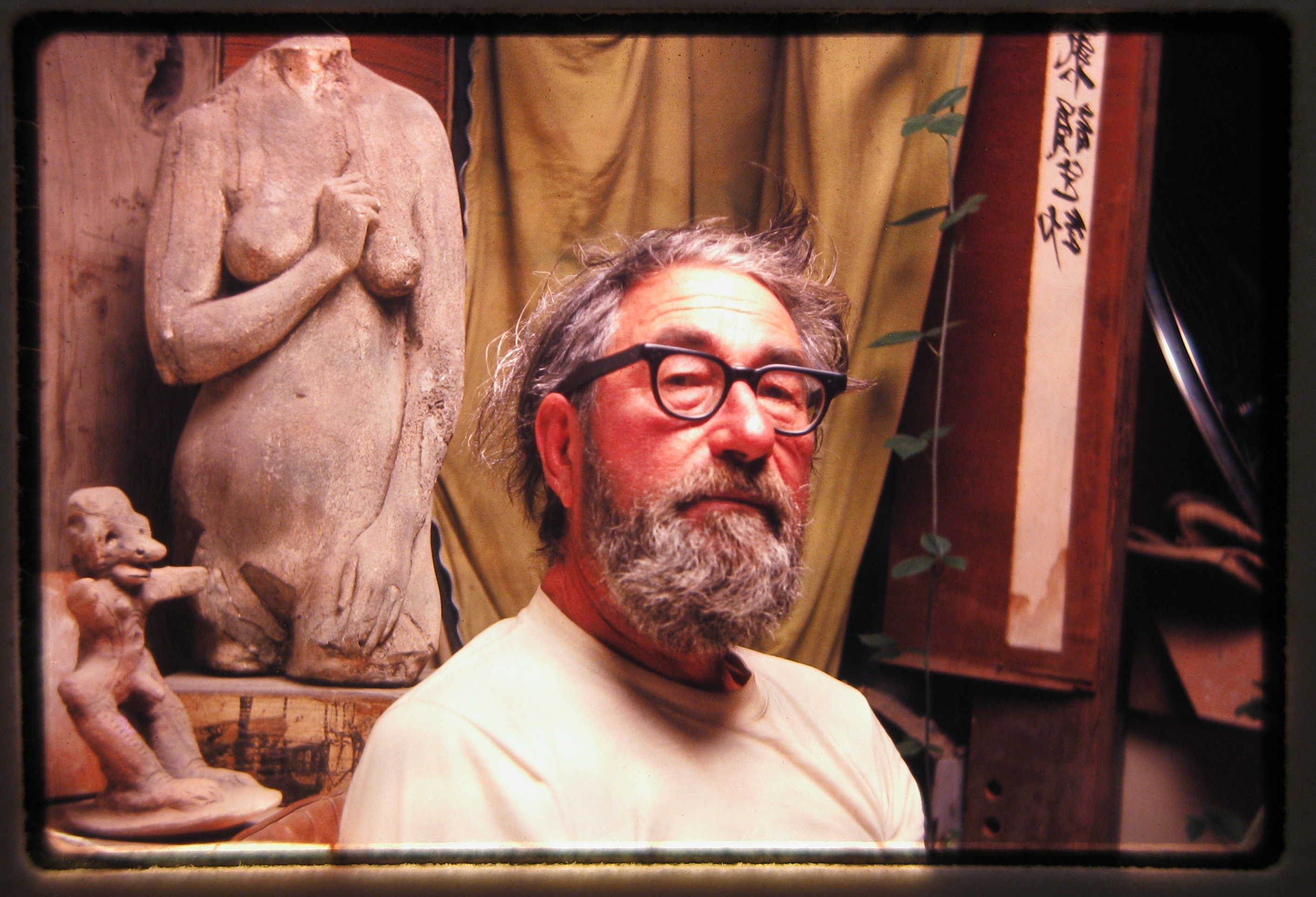
- Born: Joseph T. Funk, Jr. c. 1914; Los Angeles, California, U.S.
- Died: February 2, 1981; Santa Cruz, California, U.S.
- Resting place: Soquel, California, U.S.
- Occupations: master printmaker, artist
- Children: 2

Joseph T. Funk (c. 1914 – 1981) was an American artist, printmaker, and educator. He was a sculptor, lithographer, and muralist. Funk worked as a master printmaker at Tamarind Lithography Workshop, Kanthos Press, and Joseph Press.

== Early life and education ==
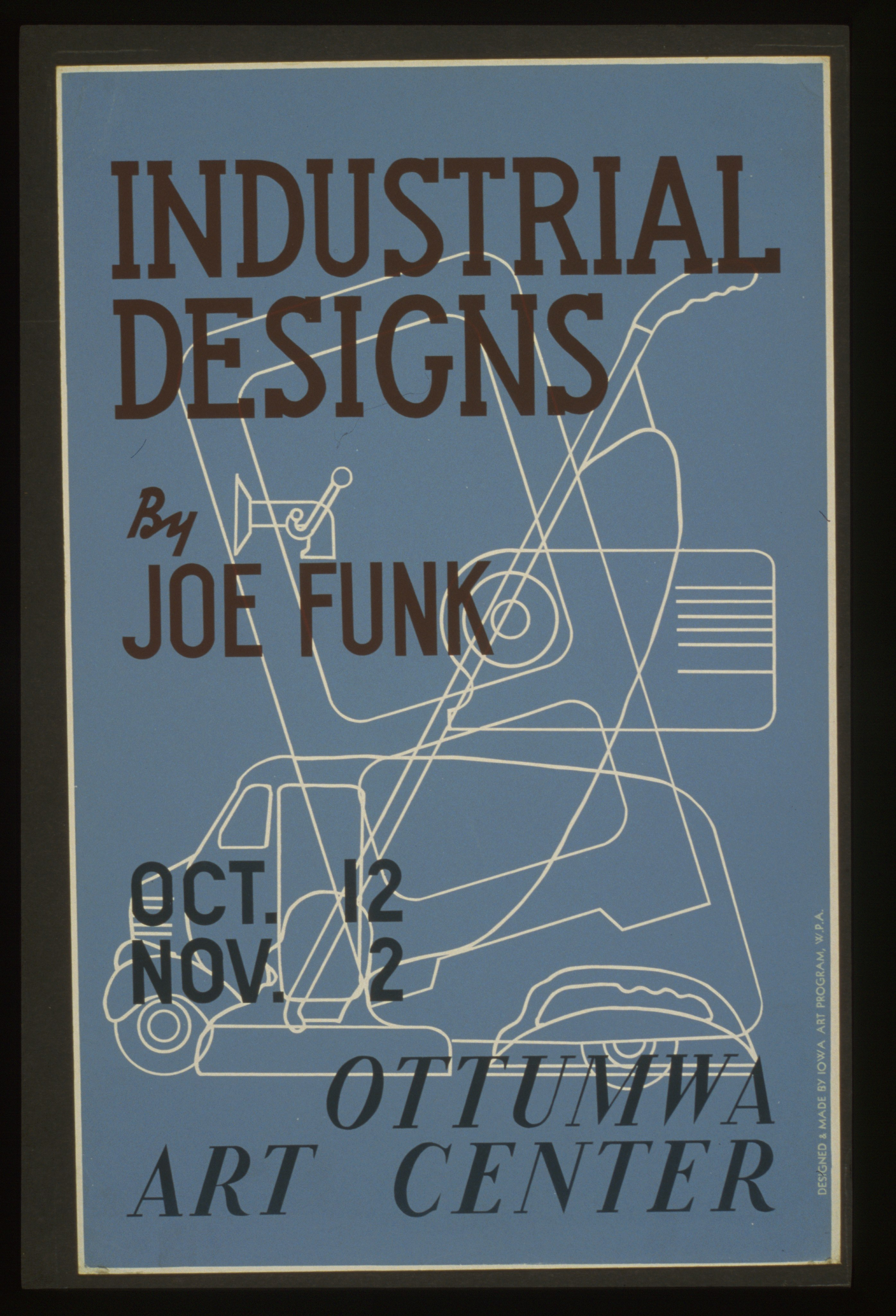
Federal Art Project poster for an exhibition of industrial design by Joe Funk (1940)

Joe Funk's mural (1979), at 3rd and Sunset Avenue in Los Angeles

Joseph Funk was born in Los Angeles, California. There are discrepancies on his date of birth with dates including 1901, March 19, 1914, and 1917. His parents were Polish and German immigrant.

As a young person in Los Angeles, Funk showed an interest in art and he studied at the Otis College of Art and Design and Chouinard Art Institute.

He worked on several murals throughout Los Angeles in the Works Progress Administration. Funk served the United States Army, from 1943 to 1946 in Korea and Okinawa as a heavy anti aircraft artillery mechanic and instructor, warehouseman, and artist/publicist/graphic designer for special events at Headquarters Company, Asiatic Command. At the ASCOM University in Korea he was an instructor in pencil sketching. It was during his time in Korea that he developed a lifelong interest in Asian art.

Using the G.I. Bill after the Korean War, he earned a Master's Degree in fine art from the University of Southern California.

== Career ==
In the 1950s, Funk met Lynton Richards Kistler and worked at Kistler's facility in Los Angeles, one of the only lithographic press open for business on the west coast at that time. During his time as an apprentice, Funk printed for many well-known artists, such as Jean Charlot, Man Ray, Max Ernst, Emerson Woelffer and June Wayne.

When June Wayne opened the Tamarind Lithography Workshop (now Tamarind Institute) in Los Angeles in 1960, she offered the first Tamarind Printer-fellowship to Funk, from July 1960 to July 1961. At Tamarind, he worked alongside Garo Z. Antreasian at printing lithographs for guest artists and training future printmakers.

After Tamarind, Funk became a master printer at Kanthos Press, from 1961 to 1962. At Kanthos Press, he printed for artists Ed Ruscha, José Luis Cuevas, and Aubrey Schwartz.

In 1964, he became co-owner of Joseph Press, alongside Joseph Zirker. At Joseph Press, he was a printmaker for Sam Francis, Arnold Belkin and Rico Lebrun.

From 1962 to 1964, Funk taught at the Chouinard Art Institute.

Funk established a non-profit corporation in Venice, California, in the late 1960s called Joseph Graphics. Here he trained apprentice printmakers and printed for numerous artists including Joyce Treiman, Dan Stolpe, and Arnold Schifrin. It was in this period of time that Joe began creating sculptures with found objects such as feathers, bones, leather, other bits of scrap metal, wire, fabric, paper, wood, plastic, pieces of ceramic, rocks, shells, and many other small and large pieces of various manmade and organic materials. He called these sculptures "Funk Icons".

In the late 1970s, he contributed to several mural projects in Los Angeles funded by the Comprehensive Employment and Training Act grants.

Funk spent his last two years living with cancer. During this time Dan Stolpe gathered all of his artwork and equipment and brought Joe to live with him in Santa Cruz, California, where the two of them developed the Native Images printmaking program and facility. A few weeks before his death Joe gave his life's work to Native Images, a collection of art that represents his 50 years as an American artist.

== Death and legacy ==
He died on February 2, 1981, in Santa Cruz, California. He was survived by two daughters.

"Joe Funk played a little-known but important role in the development of American lithography during the 1950s and 1960s," said Tamarind Institute director Clinton Adams, "first as Lynton Kistler's assistant and later as the initial printer-fellow at Tamarind Lithography Worksop in Los Angeles. That was a time when fine lithographic printing hung by a slender thread in the United States: unlike today, there were then only a very few dedicated printers with knowledge of the craft. Joe was one of this small number, without whom the present health of the medium could not have come about. His easy-going warmth and good nature made it a pleasure to work with him."

His work is in public museum collections, including at the Art Institute of Chicago, Fine Art Museums of San Francisco, the Smithsonian American Art Museum.
