= Daniel Owen Stolpe =

American artist (1939–2018)

Daniel Owen Stolpe (November 14, 1939 – December 12, 2018) was an American artist, painter, sculptor, master printmaker, fine artist book publisher, poetry book illustrator, and the founder of Native Images Editions, Santa Cruz, California.

Stolpe devoted his entire life to exploring the traditional spiritual and aesthetic culture of Native Americans and bringing that tradition to renewed contemporary expression in dramatic and expressive monotypes, woodcuts, serigraphs, etchings, and paintings.

== Life and work ==
Daniel Owen Stolpe was born on November 14, 1939, in Los Angeles, California. As a student in the early 1960s at Otis Art Institute in Los Angeles, he met and studied under artist, teacher, and printmaker Don La Viere Turner (1929–1997) and art history professor Patrick Lennox Tierney. Stolpe eventually left college to apprentice under Turner, where he learned the art of creating and printing intaglios and woodcuts.

In 1963, Stolpe and Herb Fox opened Montecito Press in Sierra Madre, California. During this time Stolpe printed intaglios and woodcuts using a combination press of his own design. Two graduates of Tamarind Printmaking Workshop (now Tamarind Institute) in Los Angeles, California. Joe Funk and Joe Zirker, two master printers created their own business in 1964, called Joseph Press in Venice, California. They had obtained a press designed and built by Stolpe.

Stolpe was associated with artists such as Don LaViere Turner, Leonard Edmondson, Dutch artist Nic Jonk, James Joe, and Ambrose Teasawito. He contributed his own artwork to notable publications, such as William Everson's "Canticle to the Waterbirds," and William Shipley's translations of Maidu Indian myths recounted around 1900 by Maidu storyteller Hanc'Ibyjim to Harvard University anthropologist and linguist Roland Dixon and published as Love and Death by Native Images in 2004.

Over the span of 20 years, Stolpe exhibited internationally in Japan, Spain, Oaxaca, Mexico, and Mexico City. He worked with master printer Raul Soruco, and displayed his art at Soruco's Galeria Gràfica in Oaxaca from 1994 to 1996.

Stolpe's works are represented in many collections, including the Fogg Art Museum, the Grunwald Collection at University of California, Los Angeles, the Portland Art Museum, and the Smithsonian Institution. The Special Collections Library at the University of California, Santa Cruz has an endowment and an archive dedicated to the collection of Stolpe's art.

Stolpe lived most of his life in the United States, except for a few years in Canada and two years spent with the Native American Swinomish Tribe on their reservation in the state of Washington.

He resided in Santa Cruz, California, starting in 1970. Over time, Funk became Stolpe's mentor and friend, and it was with Funk that Stolpe learned the elements and fine art of creating and printing lithographs. In 1979, the two men founded a printmaking studio: Native Images Inc. in Santa Cruz, California. Stolpe died on December 12, 2018, in Santa Cruz, California.
