= Tina Fuentes =

Tina Fuentes may refer to:

- Tina Fuentes (artist) (born 1949), American artist
- Tina Fuentes (synchronized swimmer) (1984–2018), Spanish synchronized swimmer
