= Callner =

Callner is a surname. Notable people with the surname include:

- Marty Callner (1946–2025), American director
- Richard Callner (1927–2007), American painter
