= Jan Stussy =

American painter (1921–1990)

- Born: Fredric Grant Stussy, Jr. August 13, 1921; Benton County, Missouri, U.S.
- Died: July 31, 1990 (aged 68); Los Angeles, California, U.S.
- Other names: Fredric Benjamin Stussy, Jr.
- Education: Long Beach City College, ArtCenter College of Design
- Alma mater: University of California, Los Angeles, University of Southern California
- Occupations: film producer, painter, printmaker, professor
- Spouse(s): Maxine Kim Carlyle (m. 1949–?; divorced)
- Children: 1

Jan Stussy (August 13, 1921 – July 31, 1990) was an American artist, film producer, and professor. He taught for 42 years at the University of California, Los Angeles (UCLA) and was later a professor emeritus of the school. He was awarded an Academy Award for the documentary film, Gravity Is My Enemy (1977). Stussy was a prolific painter and printmaker.

== Early life and education ==
Jan Stussy was born on August 13, 1921, in Benton County, Missouri. While he was young, his family moved to Bellflower, California. He attended Excelsior High School, graduating in 1939.

Stussy attended classes at Long Beach City College, and the Art Center (now the ArtCenter College of Design), under Barse Miller. At the University of California, Los Angeles he obtained a B.F.A. degree in 1943, and studied under George J. Cox. He served as a Naval Intelligence officer during World War II. After his military service, he attended the University of Southern California (USC) and obtained a M.F.A. degree in 1953. Stussy had studied lithography with Lynton Richards Kistler and Joe Funk, and painting and drawing at USC with Francis de Erdely, and Stanton Macdonald-Wright.

Stussy was married to artist Maxine Kim (née Carlyle) in 1949, they met while working as teaching assistants at UCLA. Together they had one child, however the marriage ended in divorce.

== Career ==
He was elected as vice-president of the California Water Color Society in 1950.

Stussy taught visual arts at the University of California, Los Angeles, from 1942 until 1989. He also taught at the UCLA Extension, from 1957 to 1980.

In 1977, Stussy co-produced the documentary Gravity Is My Enemy with John C. Joseph. The film portrays one of Stussy's art students, Mark Hicks, who has been paralyzed since a childhood accident and paints and draws by holding tools between his teeth. Both producers received an Academy Award in 1978 at the 50th Academy Awards in the Best Documentary Short Film category.

== Death and legacy ==
He died on July 31, 1990, in Brentwood, West Los Angeles of a brain tumor.

Stussy's work is found in public museum collections including the National Gallery of Art, Smithsonian American Art Museum, Los Angeles County Museum of Art, Norton Simon Museum, Amon Carter Museum of American Art, Museum of Modern Art, Oakland Museum of California, Hammer Museum, and Fine Arts Museums of San Francisco.
