= Chen Lok Lee =

Chinese-born American printmaker, painter, and educator (1927–2020)

Chen Lok Lee (May 18, 1927 – December 13, 2020) was a Chinese-born American printmaker, painter, and educator based in Philadelphia, Pennsylvania.

== Biography ==
=== Early life and education ===
Chen Lok Lee was born in Canton (also known as Guangzhou), China, to Roy Hui and He Lee. He graduated from the Tay Sun Normal School, and attended the Canton Public Art College from 1956 to 1958. Lee then moved to Hong Kong, where he studied Chinese Civilization and Western Art – under the tutelage of artists Yee Bong, Tin Ying Young, and Lee Byng – at Hong Kong University. He graduated from HKU in 1959.

=== New York City and Rome ===
In 1959, Chen Lok Lee moved to the United States. He settled in New York City, where he attended the Art Student's League, studying under George Grosz, Stephen Greene, Robert Hale, and Hans Hoffman through 1967. He then continued his travels and studies, attending the Rome Academy in Rome, Italy, from 1967 to 1970. While in Italy he gave lectures, participated in a group exhibition at the American Embassy, and had a solo show at Gallery 86 in Rome in 1969.

=== Tyler School of Art and the Tamarind Institute ===
Chen Lok Lee returned to the United States, and in 1971 earned an MFA from the Tyler School of Art, Temple University, Philadelphia, PA. At Tyler he focused on Painting and Lithography, under the guidance of Romas Viesulas and Richard Callner. Lee refined his printmaking skills through a residency at the Tamarind Institute in Albuquerque, New Mexico, funded through a 1972–73 fellowship from the Ford Foundation and the National Endowment for the Arts. He continued working at Tamarind through 1974.

=== Artwork and career ===
Chen Lok Lee made lithographs, watercolors, and paintings that combine Chinese and Western styles. For example, in the 1980s he made lithographs that combine traditional Chinese ink techniques with a French Romantic palette and Italian compositional formalism. These unexpected and enigmatic works harness a fierce and spontaneous energy.

Lee exhibited work locally, as well as internationally. In 1978 he took part in the show "Philadelphia Teaches Printmaking" at the Print Club, Philadelphia, PA. In 1982, Lee was invited by Her Majesty's Service to participate in an international exhibition in Hong Kong. His watercolor "Cranes and Old Pine" was exhibited at the Notemyer Gallery in Philadelphia, Pennsylvania, 1985. In 1987 he mounted a solo show of lithography at the International Art Gallery in Washington, DC. A solo exhibition of Lee's watercolor paintings was held at ATD-American Contemporary in Wyncote, PA,1990.

Lecture, demonstrations, and additional exhibition venues include: Moore College of Art, Maryland Institute College of Art, Bucks County Community College, the University of Pennsylvania, Rutgers University, the Philadelphia Print Club, Beaver College, and Goucher College. In 1986 he co-juried the Doylestown Art League exhibition, at Rodman House in Doylestown, PA, with Moe Brooker.

=== Teaching ===
Chen Lok Lee was a devoted teacher. He began teaching at the Moore College of Art in Philadelphia, Pennsylvania, in 1974, where he set up and maintained a professional printshop. Lee was associate professor of Printmaking at Moore College, where he directed the lithography workshop in the late 1970s. He also served as a Department Director at Moore in the mid-1980s.

=== Master printer ===
In the early 1970s, Chen Lok Lee and Richard Callner set up a printshop in Philadelphia, Mantegna Press II, where Lee was the technical director. Lee printed lithographic editions for artists Pat Steir and Frederick Hammersley. Lee's print of Steir's self-portrait after Rembrandt was exhibited at the Philadelphia Print Club, in a 1988 show that focused on the city's local master printers and their workshops. The 1973 lithograph "Seems," that he produced for Hammersley, published by Tamarind Institute, is held in the permanent collection at the New Mexico Museum of Art.

=== Family and death ===
Chen Lok Lee was married to Linda (née Heinle) Lee. His children are Romana Lee Akiyama (Cliff) and Raymond Lee, and his grandchild is named Hanalee. Lee died in Lansdale, PA on December 13, 2020.

=== Legacy ===
On December 21, 2020, Chen Lok Lee received a posthumous Congressional honor from Dwight Evans, of Pennsylvania, in the US House of Representatives.
