= Kinji =

- Gender: Male

Origin
- Origin: Japanese
- Meaning: Different meanings depending on the kanji used

Kinji (written: 欣二, 欽治, 錦司 or キンジ in katakana) is a masculine Japanese given name. Notable people with the name include:

- Kinji Akagawa (born 1940), American sculptor
- Kinji Fukasaku (深作 欣二) (1930–2003), Japanese actor, screenwriter and film director
- Kinji Imanishi (今西 錦司) (1902–1992), Japanese scientist
- Kinji Shibuya (キンジ 渋谷) (1921–2010), American professional wrestler and actor
- Kinji Zeniya (銭谷 欽治) (born 1953), Japanese badminton player

Fictional characters:

- Kinji Tohyama, a character from the anime series Aria the Scarlet Ammo
