= Erle Loran =

American painter and art historian

- Born: October 2, 1905; Minneapolis, Minnesota
- Died: May 13, 1999 (aged 93); Berkeley, California, U.S.
- Education: University of Minnesota; Minneapolis College of Art and Design
- Occupations: Painter, art historian
- Spouse: Ruth Schorer
- Relatives: Suki Schorer (stepdaughter)

Erle Loran (October 2, 1905 – May 13, 1999) was an American painter and art historian. He was a professor of art at the University of California, Berkeley from 1937 to 1981, and the author of a book about French painter Paul Cézanne. His own paintings are held in museums in California and New York.

== Life ==
Loran was born on October 2, 1905, in Minneapolis, Minnesota. He attended the University of Minnesota and graduated from the Minneapolis College of Art and Design in 1926. In 1926, he was awarded the Chaloner Foundation Scholarship to study in Europe for the next four years. He studied the artwork of French painter Paul Cézanne, and he lived in Cézanne's studio in Aix-en-Provence.

Loran returned to Minnesota due to tuberculosis, and he became a painter in his own right. He painted landscapes and portraits, and he won the Grand Sweepstakes Prize at the 1934 Minnesota State Fair. Loran was also an arts educator. He was a professor of art at the University of California, Berkeley from 1937 to 1981. Loran was a leader of the "Berkeley School," a group of his colleagues who, following Cezanne, "placed greater emphasis on linear and textural qualities, flat planes of color, and shallow “picture box” treatment of space." He authored Cézanne's Composition, a 1943 book in which he compared Cézanne's paintings to what he saw in Provence. At his retirement, Loran was awarded the University Citation for his contributions. His students included Sam Francis, Ynez Johnston, Jay DeFeo, Richard Diebenkorn, Elmer Bischoff, and Robert Colescott. Loran was also a collector of Mexican and African art from the Pre-Columbian era.

In 1940, Loran was one of 20 artists who provided prints for the San Francisco Chronicle's efforts to provide original works of art by Western artists to the public. They sold for $2 each. His "San Francisco Bay," a Cezanne-like rendering that includes a freighter on the water and Alcatraz in the background, is included in the collections of the San Francisco Museum of Modern Art, the National Gallery of Art, and the Philadelphia Museum of Art.

Loran married Clyta Sisson on May 8, 1937. Clyta died of cancer in March 1982. Loran later married Ruth Schorer, whose first husband was art critic Mark Schorer and daughter was ballet dancer Suki Schorer. Loran died on May 13, 1999, in Berkeley, California, at 93. His work is at the San Francisco Museum of Modern Art, the Oakland Museum of California, and the Metropolitan Museum of Art in New York City. His art collection was acquired by the de Young Museum in 2008. His widow died in 2010.

== Selected works ==
- Loran, Erle (1943). Cézanne's Composition: Analysis of His Form, with Diagrams and Photos of his Motifs. Berkeley, California: University of California Press. OCLC 614357650.
