= Nicola López =

American contemporary artist (born 1975)

- Born: 1975 (age 50–51); Santa Fe, New Mexico
- Education: Columbia University
- Known for: Drawing, painting, printmaking
- Website: https://www.nicolalopez.com

Nicola López (1975) is an American contemporary artist known for her drawings, prints, installations and collages.

López has exhibited both nationally and internationally including at the MoMA, Metropolitan Museum of Art, the Guggenheim, LACMA, Museo Rufino Tamayo in Mexico City, and the Beijing Inside-Out Museum (北京中间美术馆). She has been the recipient of numerous grants and residencies such as the Joan Mitchell Foundation MFA Grant in 2004, the 2005 NYFA Fellowship in Drawing/Printmaking/Book Arts, and Sovern/Columbia Affiliated Fellowship at the American Academy in Rome in 2020. López received a 2024 Guggenheim Fellowship in Fine Art.

== Early life ==
López was born in Santa Fe, New Mexico, in 1975. She studied at the Escola de Artes Visuais (School of Visual Arts) in Rio de Janeiro, Brazil in 1996. She earned a BA in 1998 and an MFA in visual arts from Columbia University in 2004. In 2002 López also attended Skowhegan School of Painting and Sculpture.

López lives in Brooklyn, New York, and she teaches at Columbia University.

== Exhibitions ==
=== Solo exhibitions ===
- 2022 "Nicola López and Paula Wilson: Becoming Land," Albuquerque Museum, Albuquerque, New Mexico
- 2022 "Neither There nor Here," Elizabeth Leach Gallery, Portland Oregon
- 2022 "Visions, Phantoms, and Apparitions," Center for Maine Contemporary Art, Rockland, Maine
- 2020 "Haunted," Albuquerque Museum, Albuquerque, New Mexico
- 2019 "Apariciones," Arróniz Arte Contemporáneo," Mexico City, Mexico
- 2019 “Nicola López: Parasites, Prosthetics, Parallels and Partners,” Tamarind Institute, Albuquerque, New Mexico
- 2018 "Relics, Fibs, Trash + Treasures,” Hawthorn Contemporary; Milwaukee, Wisconsin
- 2017 “Big Windows: Skin : Portals,” Jacob Lewis Gallery, New York, New York
- 2016 “Project Atrium: In Gentle Defiance of Gravity and Form,” Jacksonville Museum of Contemporary Art, Jacksonville, Florida
- 2014 “One Valley Over, a World Apart,” Arróniz Arte Contemporáneo, Mexico City, Mexico
- 2014 “Forecasting an Impossibly Possible Tomorrow,” Elizabeth Leach Gallery, Portland, Oregon
- 2014 “Half-Life,” Oregon College of Arts and Crafts, Portland, Oregon
- 2014 “Babel Revisited: History Repeats Itself,” Savannah College of Art & Design Museum of Art, Savannah, Georgia
- 2013 "Un-building Things," Installation commissioned by the Metropolitan Museum of Art, New York
- 2013 "Land and Illusion," Pace Prints Gallery, New York
- 2011 "Intervals: Nicola López," Solomon R. Guggenheim Museum, New York
- 2009 "Nicola López: Urban Transformations," Chazen Museum, Madison
- 2008 “Constriction Zone,” Franklin Art Works, Minneapolis

=== Group exhibitions ===
- 2009 Denver Art Museum
- 2008 “Phantom Sightings: Art after the Chicano Movement,” Museo Rufino Tamayo, Mexico City
- 2008 “Phantom Sightings: Art after the Chicano Movement” Los Angeles County Museum of Art
- 2005 “Greater New York 2005,” P.S.1 Contemporary Art Center
- 2007 "Orpheus Selection: Nicola López & Lisa Sigal," Museum of Modern Art, New York
- 2022 "Becoming Land," Albuquerque Museum, Albuquerque, New Mexico

== Public collections ==
- MOMA, New York
- Madison Museum of Contemporary Art, Madison, WI
- University of New Mexico Art Museum, Albuquerque, NM
- Museo Nacional de la Estampa, México D.F., México
- Metropolitan Museum of Art, New York
- Irish Museum of Modern Art

== Editions ==
López has worked extensively with various fine art print publishers, collaborating to produce editions in silkscreen, lithography, intaglio, relief as well as on books and installation based objects. At the LeRoy Neiman Center for Print Studies, where López became first associated as an MFA fellow at Columbia University, she worked on three editions in 2018, 2019 and 2023. She has been an artist in residence at the Tamarind Institute at the University of New Mexico four times, collaborating with the workshop on both traditional lithographs and on large scale, hand-cut pieces with the 2017 series Parasites, Prosthetics, Parallels, Partners. At Tandem Press in Madison, Wisconsin, López has published numerous editions and at Pace Prints, NY, she has worked on various series since 2008. Other smaller, independent workshops she has worked with include Gráfica Zanate in Oaxaca, Taller Pablo Torrealba in Mexico City, Interbang Press in Santa Fe, and Ten Grand Press in Brooklyn. In 2019, López' screenprint BK was published by Print Center New York as part of the portfolio Pulled in Brooklyn for their 2019 benefit auction, accompanied by a seminal, homonymous group exhibition featuring over 100 artists in celebration of Brooklyn's print culture and community. Her self published series Ideal Structures for a Dubious Future is held at the Metropolitan Museum as part of the permanent collection.
