= Margo Humphrey =

American printmaker (born 1942)

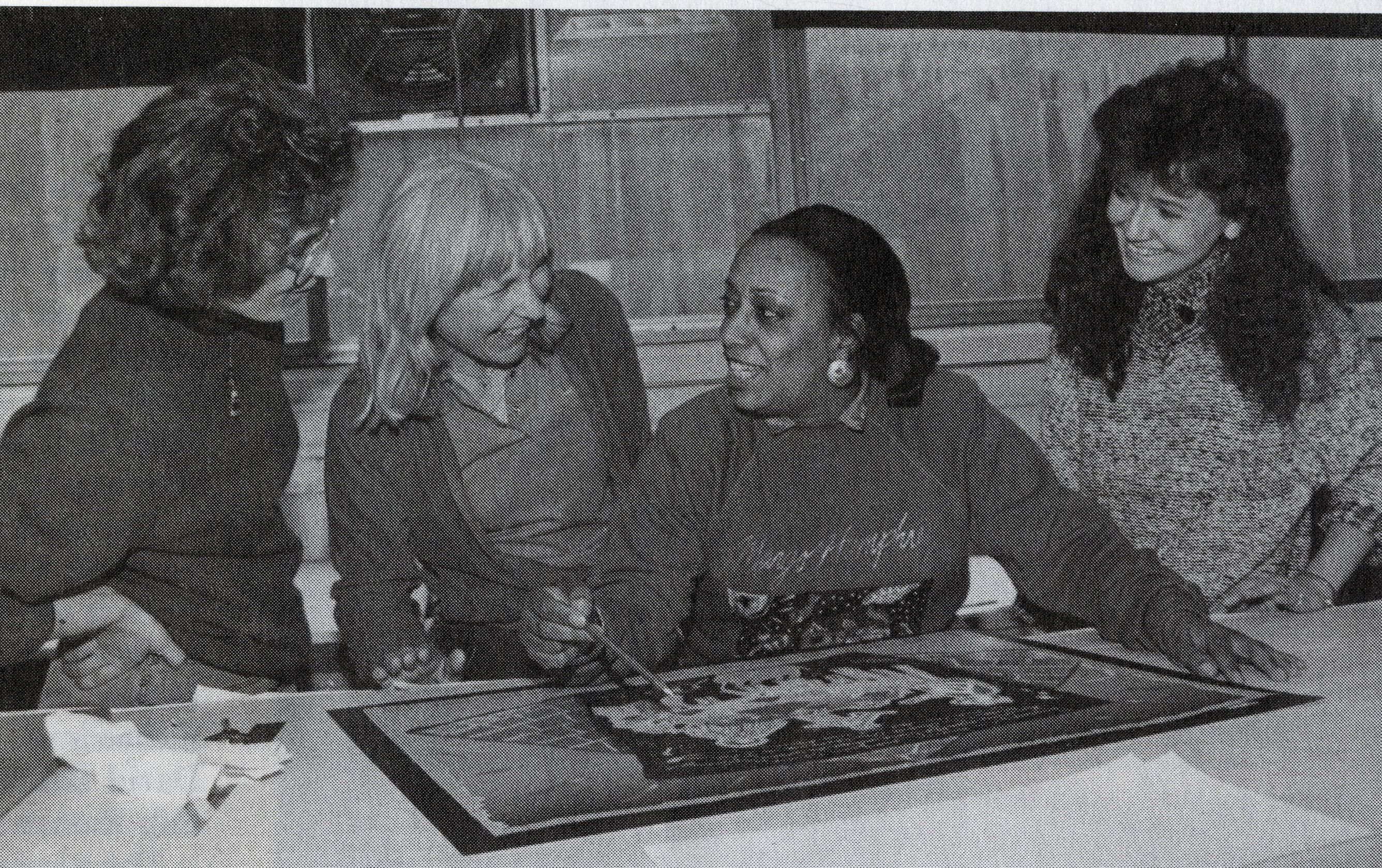
- Born: June 25, 1942 (age 84); Oakland, California, U.S.
- Education: California College of Arts and Crafts, Stanford University
- Known for: Printmaking

Margo Humphrey (born June 25, 1942) is an American printmaker, illustrator and art teacher. She earned a Master of Fine Arts degree from Stanford after earning a Bachelor of Fine Arts degree at the California College of Arts and Crafts in printmaking. She has traveled in Africa, Brazil, the Caribbean, and Europe and has taught in Fiji, Nigeria, Uganda, and the University of Maryland. As a printmaker, Humphrey is known for her "bold, expressive use of color and freedom of form", creating works that are "engaging, exuberant and alive". Her work is considered to be "in the forefront of contemporary printmaking".

== Career ==
External videos
- Margo Humphrey pt.1: Our Common Bond Artists Talk, "I am Precious"; Myrtis Bedolla on YouTube, 9:37
- Margo Humphrey pt.2: Our Common Bond Artists Talk, "My mother planted all kinds of flowers" Myrtis Bedolla on YouTube, 10:45

Humphrey was born in Oakland, California, on June 25, 1942. She attended the Oakland Public Schools and graduated in 1960 from Oakland High School as an art major. After earning her BFA in Painting and Printmaking from the California College of Arts and Crafts, she attended Stanford University Graduate School earning a Masters of Fine Arts degree with Honors in Printmaking in 1974. Humphrey is the first Black woman to graduate from the Stanford University Graduate School art department.

She began teaching in 1973 at the University of California Santa Cruz and has since taught at the University of Texas at San Antonio, the San Francisco Art Institute, and School of the Art Institute of Chicago. She has also taught at the University of the South Pacific at Suva, Fiji; Yaba Technological Institute of Fine Art, Ekoi Island, Nigeria; the University of Benin in Benin City, Nigeria; the Margaret Trowell School of Fine Art in Kampala, Uganda, and the Fine Art School of the National Gallery of Art, Harare, Zimbabwe. She is currently the Department Head of Printmaking the University of Maryland in College Park.

Humphrey has worked with significant printmaking ateliers including the Rutgers Center for Innovative Print and Paper, the Bob Blackburn Printmaking Workshop and the Tamarind Institute in New Mexico. She was one of the earliest African-American woman artists to be recognized for lithographic works and the first to have her prints published by Tamarind, in 1974.

She has also published a children's book, The River that gave gifts (1987).

== Artistic style and themes ==
Humphrey has worked in many different art mediums, she is particularly respected for her work in lithography. Her techniques for layering colors are uncommon in lithography. She is attracted to the fluidness of lithography.

Her work is expressionist in terms of the bright colors and symbols she uses to create autobiographical scenes from her life, combined with mystical imagery. Using everyday objects in her work as iconography, Humphrey's symbols allude to Black culture, and illuminate her experience as an African-American woman. Themes of religion, race, and gender are present within her work. Her humorous outlook on mundane experiences is influenced by Robert Colescott. Humphrey's use of vivid colors and icons in her narrative works is meant to evoke memory and emotion from the viewer.

She developed her work The Last Bar-B-Que, a vividly colored transformation of the Last Supper, following a three-year period during which she examined portrayals by artists from Pietro Lorenzetti to Emil Nolde. The Last Bar-B-Que is considered one of American visual culture's iconic images.

== Exhibitions ==
Humphrey's first solo exhibition occurred in 1965. Since then, Humphrey's works have been exhibited internationally, and are held in major institutions including the Museum of Modern Art in New York, The Smithsonian American Art Museum in Washington, D.C., the Philadelphia Museum of Art, the Hampton University Museum, the Victoria and Albert Museum in London, the Museum of Modern Art, Rio de Janeiro, and the National Gallery of Modern Art, Lagos. In 1996, she was invited to be part of the World Printmaking Survey at the Museum of Modern Art, New York City, NY.

Her Story: Margo Humphrey Lithographs and Works on Paper (2011), at the Hampton University Museum, is a 45-year retrospective of her work, curated by Robert E. Steele and Adrienne L. Childs.

== Awards and honors ==
Humphrey has received many awards and honors, including:

- The James D. Pheland Award from the World Print Council
- National Endowment of the Arts Fellowships, 1988
- Ford Foundation Fellowship, 1981
- Tiffany Fellowships, 1988
- Teaching Fellowships from the United States Information Agency Arts America Program
