= Hans Burkhardt =

Swiss-American abstract expressionist artist (1904 – 1994)

- Hans Burkhardt, Untitled, 1950. Oil on canvas
- Born: Hans Gustav Burkhardt; 20 December 1904; Basel, Switzerland
- Died: 22 April 1994 (aged 89); Los Angeles, California
- Education: Cooper Union School of the Arts (1925-28), Grand Central School of Art (1928-29)
- Known for: Painting, Printmaking
- Movement: Abstract expressionism, cubism, protest art
- Spouse: Thordis Burkhardt
- Children: Elsa L. Brown

Hans Gustav Burkhardt (December 20, 1904 – April 22, 1994) was a Swiss-American abstract expressionist artist.

== Life and work ==
Burkhardt was born in the industrial quarter of Basel, Switzerland. When he was three, his father abandoned the family to move to America, and a few years later, when his mother died of tuberculosis, he and his sister went to live in an orphanage.

Burkhardt was a 20-year-old gardener's apprentice in the orphanage when he left for New York to work as a cabinetmaker with his father. Within the same year, he had lost his father in a car accident and his step-mother to an illness. Captivated by Germanic art, he began dabbling in art in his spare time while learning how to decorate furniture in antique styles. He became foreman of the furniture company's decorating department.

From 1925 to 1928 he attended the Cooper Union School of the Arts, where he befriended mentor Arshile Gorky and Willem de Kooning—sharing Gorky's studio from 1928 to 1937.

Burkhardt's paintings of the 1930s are part of the genesis of American abstract expressionism. In 1937 he moved to Los Angeles and represented the most significant bridge between New York and Los Angeles. His experimental investigative approach paralleled, and in many instances anticipated, the development of modern and contemporary art in New York and Europe including the work of Mark Rothko, Jackson Pollock, and Barnett Newman.

Burkhardt held his first solo exhibition in 1939 at Stendahl Gallery in Los Angeles, arranged by Lorser Feitelson, and, in response to the Spanish Civil War, he painted his first anti-war works. From the late 1930s he began to produce apocalyptic anti-war compositions, a theme which became particularly pronounced in an abstract expressionist style after the atom bomb was dropped on Hiroshima and Nagasaki at the end of the Second World War. He was praised for his “willingness to confront political reality directly in his art,” and in the 1940s he embarked on a body of work that underscored the duality evident throughout his entire oeuvre—cathartic works of power and poignancy contrasted by works of celebration and hope.

In the years following an acclaimed (1945) solo exhibition at the Los Angeles County Museum, Burkhardt continued in his art to respond to WWII, and endured censorship due to the proliferation of McCarthyism, and in the aftermath of Gorky's suicide in 1948, Burkhardt delved in to his grief and celebration of Gorky's life creating several versions of “Burial of Gorky” and a series entitled “Journey into the Unknown.”

Burkhardt first visited Mexico in 1950, and spent the next decade living half of the year in and around Guadalajara. Strongly influenced by Mexican attitudes towards the dead, and by the country's colors, sensuality, and spiritual qualities, Burkhardt “painted the soul of Mexico” with Mexican themes and colors—especially those of burials and ceremonies surrounding death—permeating his abstract work. Art critics of the time considered him a "great Mexican master” alongside Orozco, Rivera, and Siqueiros, and Rufino Tamayo admired his work. Overall, in the 1950s Burkhardt held 23 solo exhibitions in Los Angeles and Mexico, and participated in group shows at over thirty museums worldwide.

In the 1960s he produced paintings in protest against the Vietnam War, some of which incorporated the human skulls he had collected from Mexican graveyards. As art historian Donald Kuspit stated, Burkhardt was “a master—indeed the inventor—of the abstract memento mori.” In 1964, for the first time in forty years, Burkhardt returned to Basel, and began making annual summer visits where he became a friend of Mark Tobey—printing linocuts for the artist and collecting his work.

In the 1970s Burkhardt continued his anti-war paintings—incorporating protruding wooden spikes into the canvas—while simultaneously painting abstractions of merging lovers and cityscapes during his summer visits to Basel. His “Small Print” (protesting smoking), “Graffiti,” and “Northridge” series demonstrate the evolution of his symbolism, and his “Desert Storms” series, in response to Iraq's invasion of Kuwait, was discussed by critic Peter Selz at a presentation at the International Congress of Art Critics Conference.

In the last decades of his life, Burkhardt's work had moved from images of imbalance to a study of human tragedy—which he embraced in an attempt to discover beauty and facilitate understanding. Critic Peter Frank called Burkhardt “…one of America’s most vital abstract expressionist painters, someone who took the seed of the movement and cultivated it a rather different way in very different soil,” and historian Eugene Anderson declared Burkhardt “Goya’s spiritual heir.”

Burkhardt taught at numerous colleges and universities and retired as a professor emeritus from California State University, Northridge. In 1992 Burkhardt was honored as the recipient of the Lifetime Achievement Award by the American Academy and Institute of Arts and Letters’ Jimmy Ernst Award. Also in 1992, he established the Hans G. and Thordis W. Burkhardt Foundation. In 1993, the last year of his career, his final series “Black Rain” channeled pain and hardship, but provided poignant, symbolic beacons of hope and wishes for a better future for humanity. His unique role as an important American painter is affirmed by the constant interest and continuing reassessment afforded his work.

== Solo exhibitions ==
- 1939: Stendahl Gallery, Los Angeles, March 27 – April 17
- 1945: Hans Burkhardt, Los Angeles County Museum of Art
- 1951: Museo de Bellas Artes, Guadalajara, Mexico: Exhibicion de Pinturas Modernas; Comara Gallery, Los Angeles
- 1953: Fisher Gallery, University of Southern California, Los Angeles
- 1957: Pasadena Art Museum, California: Ten Year Retrospective, June 14 – July 14;
- 1961-62: Thirty Year Retrospective (travelled to Santa Barbara Museum of Art, April 11 – May 7, 1961, Los Angeles Municipal Art Gallery, January 9 – February 4, 1962, Legion of Honor (museum), San Francisco, June 10 – July 9, 1962)
- 1968: San Diego Museum of Art: Vietnam Paintings
- 1972: Long Beach Museum of Art, California: Retrospective 1950 – 1972, July 16 – September 24;
- 1973: California State University, Northridge, A Retrospective Exhibition, November 20 – December 7
- 1977: Santa Barbara Museum of Art, California, Linocuts and Pastels, March 5 – April 20;
- 1978: Laguna Beach Museum of Art, California: Mark Tobey / Hans Burkhardt, September 12 – October 23
- 1982: Jack Rutberg Fine Arts, Los Angeles: Arshile Gorky and Hans Burkhardt, January 9 – February 27
- 1983: Jack Rutberg Fine Arts, Los Angeles: Hans Burkhardt: Basel Graffiti Series; Jack Rutberg Fine Arts, Los Angeles: Hans Burkhardt: Recent Works, April 2 – May 7
- 1984: Jack Rutberg Fine Arts, Los Angeles: Pastels: 50 Years of Figurative Expressionism, April 7 – May 12
- 1985: Jack Rutberg Fine Arts, Los Angeles: Hans Burkhardt: The War Paintings, February 2 – March 23
- 1990-91 Portland Art Museum, Oregon: Mark Tobey and Hans Burkhardt: Works on Paper from the Permanent Collection
- 1991: Jack Rutberg Fine Arts, Los Angeles: Hans Burkhardt: Desert Storms, October 11 – November 30
- 1992: American Academy of Arts and Letters, New York: Hans Burkhardt, March 2 – March 29;
- 2008: California State University Northridge, Hans Burkhardt – The California State University Collection, August 25 – October 11

== Group exhibitions ==
- 1947-48: Art Institute of Chicago: Abstract and Surrealist American Art, November 6, 1947 – January 11, 1948; Modern Institute of Art, Beverly Hills: Modern Artists in Transition; Legion of Honor (museum), San Francisco: 2nd Annual Exhibition of Painting, November 19, 1947 – January 4, 1948; Los Angeles County Museum of Art: Artists of L.A. and Vicinity, May 15 – June 30, 1948
- 1950: Metropolitan Museum of Art, New York: American Painting Today; California State Fair
- 1951: Corcoran Gallery of Art, Washington, D.C.: 22nd Biennial; Whitney Museum of American Art, New York: Contemporary American Painters; Pennsylvania Academy of Fine Arts, Philadelphia; Art Institute of Chicago, Illinois, 60th Annual American Exhibition, October 25 – December 16
- 1964: Kunsthalle Basel, Switzerland; Long Beach Museum of Art, California: Art of Southern California: Early Moderns
- 1974: Los Angeles Institute of Contemporary Art, Los Angeles: Nine Senior Southern California Painters – Peter Krasnow, Nicholas Brigante, Lorser Feitelson, John McLaughlin, Florence Arnold, Helen Lunderberg, Emerson Woelffer, Hans Burkhardt
- 1976-77: Painting and Sculpture in California: The Modern Era (travelled to San Francisco Museum of Art, National Collection of Fine Arts, Smithsonian, Washington, D.C.)
- 2004-5: Iris & B. Gerald Cantor Center for Visual Arts, Stanford University, From Picasso to Thiebaud: Modern & Contemporary Art, February 18 – June 20; An American Odyssey 1945 / 1980 (Debating Modernism), Circulo de Bellas Artes, Madrid, Spain, April 13 – May 30, 2004 (travelled to Domus Artium 2002, Salamanca, Spain, June 10 – July 31, Kiosco Alfonso, A Coruña, Spain, September 2 – October 2, QCC Art Gallery / CUNY, New York, October 24, 2004 – January 15, 2005); San Diego Museum of Art, Modern Art Installation, 2004 – 2005
- 2009-10: The Philadelphia Museum of Art, Arshile Gorky: In Context, October 21, 2009 – January 10, 2010; Los Angeles Municipal Art Gallery, Barnsdall Park, LA Printmaking: 1962 to 1973, Los Angeles Printmaking Society: 20th National Exhibition, October 29, 2009 – January 3, 2010
- 2012: Pasadena Museum of California Art, LA Raw: Abject Expressionism in Los Angeles, 1945 – 1980, From Rico Lebrun to Paul McCarthy, January 22 – May 20; Brand Library Art Galleries, Glendale, California, Purchasing Power: Jurors Make Their Mark, January 21 – March 3; Alyce de Roulet Williamson Gallery, Art Center College of Design, Pasadena, Pages, October 12, 2012 – January 13, 2013; Peninsula Fine Arts Center, Newport News, Virginia, 50 Great Americans, October 21, 2012 – January 13, 2013 (travelled to Taubman Museum of Art, Roanoke, Virginia, February 15 – June 2, 2013)
- 2013: Jack Rutberg Fine Arts Gallery, Los Angeles, Letters From Los Angeles: Identity and Self Identity Through Text in Art, March 9 – April 30
- 2014: Los Angeles Convention Center, Los Angeles, LA Art Show 2014 (Group Show), January 15 – January 19; Orange County Museum of Art, Newport Beach, California, The Avant Garde Collection, September 7, 2014 – January 4, 2015; Pablo Goebel Fine Arts, Polanco, Mexico D.F., Laboratorio De Sueños: La Diаspora del Surrealismo en México, September 23 – November 20
- 2015: Los Angeles Convention Center, LA Art Show 2015 (Group Show), January 14 – January 18; Hollis Taggart Galleries, New York, New York, Gallery Selections, March 3; Palm Springs Art Museum, California, Modern Works from the Collection, March 28 – September 13
- 2017: Jack Rutberg Fine Arts Gallery (part of the Getty Foundation’s Pacific Standard Time: LA/LA), Hans Burkhardt in Mexico, September 23 — December 23

== Publications ==
- Herskovic, Marika, American Abstract Expressionism of the 1950s An Illustrated Survey (New York School Press, 2003) ISBN 0-9677994-1-4
- Kuspit, Donald, Hans Burkhardt: Black Rain (Jack Rutberg Fine Arts, 1993) ISBN 1-880566-10-9
- Selz, Peter, Hans Burkhardt: Desert Storms (Jack Rutberg Fine Arts, 1991) ISBN 1-880566-00-1
- Bordeaux, Jean-Luc and Wortz, Melina, Hans Burkhardt: Pastels, 50 Years of Figurative Expressionism (Jack Rutberg Fine Arts, 1984) ISBN 1-880566-02-8
- Hans Burkhardt: Paintings of the 1960s (Jack Rutberg Fine Arts, 2008) ISBN 1-880566-17-6
- Hans Burkhardt: The California State University, Northridge Collection (California State University, Northridge, 2008) ISBN 1-880566-16-8
- Wolfe, Townsend, Hans Burkhardt: Drawings 1932 – 1989 (The Arkansas Arts Center, 1996)
- Selz, Peter, Hans Burkhardt: Pastelle, Eine Retrospektive Von 1938 - 1983 (Berlin: Galerie Hesselbach, 1993) ISBN 1-880566-09-5
- Hans Burkhardt: Paintings and Pastels, 1988 – 1989 (Jack Rutberg Fine Arts, 1990) ISBN 1-880566-04-4
- Kuspit, Donald, Catastrophe According to Hans Burkhardt (Muhlenberg College, 1990) ISBN 0-9625911-0-6
- Hans Burkhardt: 1950 – 1960 (Jack Rutberg Fine Arts, 1987) ISBN 1-880566-02-8
- Hans Burkhardt: The War Paintings, A Catalogue Raisonne (Santa Susana Press, 1984)
- de la Vega, Aurelio, Hans Burkhardt: Basel (Jack Rutberg Fine Arts, 1983) ISBN 1-880566-01-X

== Awards ==
- 1945: Los Angeles County Museum, Annual Exhibition, Purchase Award, Oil
- 1951: Terry Art Institute, Miami, Cash Award
- 1954: Los Angeles County Museum, Second Prize, Modern Oil; California State Fair & Exposition, First Prize, Modern Oil
- 1955: Chaffey Community Art Association, Cash Award
- 1957: Los Angeles County Museum, Junior Art Council Prize; Los Angeles All-City Art Festival, Purchase Prize, Oil; California State Fair & Expo, Cash Award, Pastel
- 1958: Santa Barbara Museum of Art, Second Annual Pacific Coast Biennial; ALA Story Purchase Award
- 1960: Los Angeles All-City Art Festival, First Purchase Award, Watercolor; California Watercolor Society, Merchandise Award
- 1961: California All-City Art Festival, First Purchase Award, Oil
- 1962: California State Fair & Exposition, Second Prize, Modern Oil
- 1963: California Watercolor Society, Purchase Award
- 1969: Academia Tomasso Campanella, Rome, International Academy of Arts, Silver Medal
- 1991: Citation from Mayor Tom Bradley, City of Los Angeles (proclaiming Hans Burkhardt Week, October 11 through 17)
- 1992: American Academy & Institute of Arts & Letters, Jimmy Ernst Award in Art for Lifetime Achievement; LA Artcore, 4th Annual Award in Art

== Major collections ==
British Museum, Metropolitan Museum of Art, Kunsthalle Basel, Whitney Museum of American Art, Los Angeles Museum of Contemporary Art, Norton Simon Museum, Moderna Museet (Stockholm, Sweden), Ahmanson Collection, Arkansas Art Center (Little Rock, Arkansas), California State University (Northridge, California), Coca-Cola Collection, Columbia Museum of Art (South Carolina), Corcoran Gallery of Art, Detroit Institute of Arts, Downey Art Museum (California), Grunwald Center for the Graphic Arts, The Solomon R. Guggenheim Museum, Hirshhorn Collection (Washington, D.C.), Joslyn Art Museum (Omaha, Nebraska), Portland Museum of Art, Kunstmuseum (Switzerland), Laguna Beach Museum of Art (California), Museum of Contemporary Art San Diego, Emily and Joe Lowe Gallery, University of Miami (Florida), Oakland Museum, Palm Springs Desert Museum, Pasadena Art Museum (California), Norton Simon Museum, Portland Museum of Art, San Diego Museum of Art, Santa Barbara Museum of Art, Skirball Museum (Los Angeles), Tamarind Institute (University of New Mexico, Albuquerque), Weatherspoon Art Museum (North Carolina), American Jewish University (Los Angeles)
