= Mark Hicks =

American painter

Mark Hicks (1949-1977) of Manhattan Beach, California, was a figurative and abstract painter. He was also a quadriplegic, since falling out of a tree at age 12. Hicks was the subject of the 1977 Academy Award-winning documentary short Gravity Is My Enemy, produced by his art teacher at University of California, Los Angeles (UCLA) Jan Stussy, and directed by John C. Joseph. The life and work of Mark Hicks is examined in this documentary, along with a discussion of his being a student at UCLA, culminating with his first gallery show in San Francisco.
