= Gravity Is My Enemy =

1977 film

- Directed by: John C. Joseph
- Produced by: John C. Joseph; Jan Stussy
- Starring: Mark Hicks; Jan Stussy
- Cinematography: John Sharaf
- Distributed by: Churchill Films
- Release date: 1977
- Running time: 26 minutes
- Country: United States
- Language: English

Gravity Is My Enemy is a 1977 American short documentary film about quadriplegic visual artist Mark Hicks, directed by John C. Joseph. It won an Oscar at the 50th Academy Awards in 1978 for Documentary Short Subject.

== Cast ==
- Mark Hicks, as himself
- Jan Stussy, as himself
