= Tamarind Institute =

Lithography workshop currently at the University of New Mexico

Coordinates: 35°4′49.8″N 106°37′9.7″W

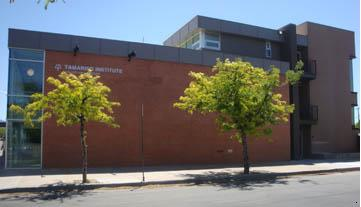
Tamarind Institute

Tamarind Institute is a lithography workshop created in 1960 as a division of the University of New Mexico in Albuquerque, New Mexico, United States. It began as Tamarind Lithography Workshop, a California non-profit corporation founded by June Wayne on Tamarind Avenue in Los Angeles in 1960. Both the current Institute and the original Lithography Workshop are referred to informally as "Tamarind."

== Origin and goals ==
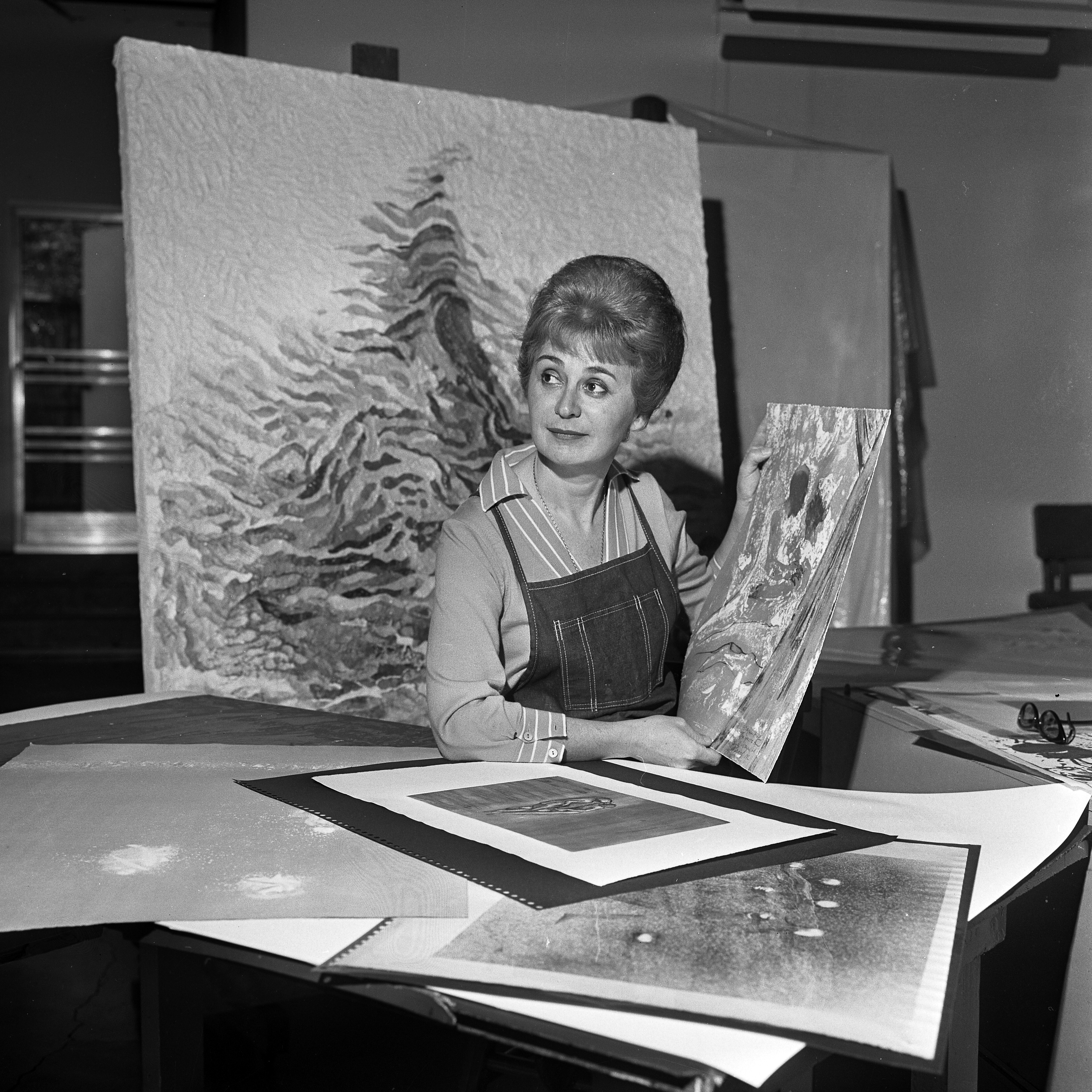
June Wayne at Tamarind Workshop, 1965

Tamarind was founded in the absence of an American print shop dedicated to serving artists, and during a period when American artists tended to reject lithography and collaborative printing in favor of the more "direct...immediate" possibilities of abstract expressionist painting.

Faced with a paucity of opportunities on all fronts and a medium which seemed on the verge of extinction, Wayne sought to create more than just a studio:

June Wayne's critical vision—a perception at the core of the Tamarind proposal—was that there were many facets to the problem, none of which could be solved in isolation from the whole. It would be insufficient to entice artists to make lithographs if they could not find opportunities for true collaboration with highly qualified artisan-printers, and it would be insufficient to establish fine workshops without thought to the economic climate in which they might exist.

Tamarind Institute's website lists the following goals, developed by founding director June Wayne with associate director Clinton Adams and technical director Garo Antreasian in 1960:"

- To create a pool of master artisan-printers in the United States by training apprentices;
- To develop a group of American artists of diverse styles into masters of this medium;
- To habituate each artist and artisan to intimate collaboration so that each becomes responsive and stimulating to the other in the work situation encouraging both to experiment widely and extend the expressive potential of the medium;
- To stimulate new markets for the lithograph;
- To plan a format to guide the artisan in earning his living outside of subsidy or total dependence on the artist's pocket;
- To restore the prestige of lithography by actually creating a collection of extraordinary prints.

== Impact ==
Tamarind can be credited with single-handedly reviving the medium of lithography in the US, both insofar as they made the medium "respectable" and viable and also in that their dedicated research led to technical and economic breakthroughs with a visible impact on lithography in particular and printmaking in general; e.g., lightfast inks, durable and consistent printmaking paper, precise registration systems, aluminum plate printing, and lightweight, large diameter rollers are but a few important aspects of printmaking which either originated at or were refined by Tamarind. The workshop also established several now-customary procedures for editioned prints, such as precisely recording and documenting every edition, and affixing both a workshop chop and a printer's chop to each proof or impression in recognition of the printer's important role.

In 2025, the Museum of Modern Art in New York, to coincide with a retrospective showing of the work of Ruth Asawa, published Ruth Asawa: The Tamarind Prints, a study of prints Asawa made at the Tamarind Institute in 1965.

== Artists ==
Below is a partial list of some of the many artists who have created editions at Tamarind:

- Rodolfo Abularach
- Clinton Adams
- Kinji Akagawa
- Anni Albers
- Josef Albers
- Garo Antreasian
- Polly Apfelbaum
- Ruth Asawa
- Alice Baber
- Sandow Birk
- Jack Boynton
- Hans Burkhardt
- Squeak Carnwath
- Willie Cole
- José Luis Cuevas
- Amy Cutler
- Elaine de Kooning
- Roy De Forest
- Dorothy Dehner
- Richard Diebenkorn
- Lesley Dill
- Jim Dine
- Burhan Doğançay
- Walton Ford
- Sam Francis
- Tina Fuentes
- Sonia Gechtoff
- Gego
- Samia Halaby
- Frederick Hammersley
- Margo Humphrey
- James Kelly
- William Kentridge
- Joyce Kozloff
- Robert Kushner
- Hung Liu
- Nicola López
- Eleanore Mikus
- Louise Nevelson
- Joseph Raffael
- Mel Ramos
- Willy Bo Richardson
- Ed Ruscha
- Jaune Quick-to-See Smith
- Kiki Smith
- Robert Stackhouse
- Hedda Sterne
- Donald Sultan
- June Wayne

== Master printers ==
One of the principal goals of the Tamarind Institute is the training of printers. Over the years, the training of these professionals has evolved since its creation in 1960. What began as an eight-week basic training course eventually developed into a two-year program. There are five levels in the program: student printer, candidate printer, assistant printer, senior printer, and master printer. There have been over 100 Master Program certificates awarded by the Tamarind Institute.

The first master printer graduate from Tamarind was Irwin Hollander of Hollander's Workshop in New York City. Judith Solodkin was the first woman to complete the program. Joe Funk was the first Tamarind fellow, serving between 1960 and 1961. From 1972 to 1973, Chen Lok Lee received a fellowship from the Ford Foundation, funded in part by the National Endowment for the Arts, to study at Tamarind. Lee went on to found Mantegna Press II, with Richard Callner, in Philadelphia, PA.

== Sources ==
- Devon, Marjorie (2000). Tamarind: 40 Years. University of New Mexico Press. ISBN 978-0-8263-2072-8.
