= Tina Fuentes (artist) =

American artist (born 1949)

- Born: 1949 (age 76–77); San Angelo, Texas
- Education: Tamarind Institute; North Texas State University

Tina Fuentes (born 1949) is an American artist known for her aggressive, bold contemporary paintings. She is Latina and lives and works in West Texas. She is currently a professor in the School of Art at Texas Tech University where she was the creator of the annual undergraduate show. Her art studio is in Lubbock, Texas. Fuentes was named one of the top 100 most influential people in Lubbock, Texas in 2008. Fuentes helped organize first annual Dia de los Muertos procession in Lubbock in the late 1990s.

== Early life and education ==
Fuentes was born in San Angelo, Texas. She was raised in Odessa, Texas. She began her study of art at Odessa College. She received her BFA and MFA at North Texas State University. During her time in New Mexico, Fuentes attended and trained at the Tamarind Institute. Fuentes designed her own home, basing it on native adobe architecture.

== Career and Art ==
Fuentes taught art in Albuquerque, New Mexico for about 15 years. Over the years, she has taught in Texas Public Schools, the Waco Art Center and at the University of Albuquerque and the University of New Mexico. Fuentes now resides in Lubbock, TX and works at Texas Tech University's School of Art as a professor of painting in the studio art department.

Since 2014, Fuentes has been collaborating with Eric Bruning, an associate professor of atmospheric science at Texas Tech, on a five-year interdisciplinary initiative on severe weather funded by a CAREER Award from the National Science Foundation. The collaboration resulted in two large exhibitions in late 2017, Marcando el relampago at the Museum of Texas Tech University and Nubes tan negras at the Louise Hopkins Underwood Center for the Arts.

For many years, Fuentes limited her palette to black and white. Her art, over a 30-year period, has explored the boundaries of both abstract and representational art. Deconstructing everyday objects has also become an important part of her work. Fuentes herself describes her work as "non-objective or abstract," but also as "biographies and self-portraits." She sees her art as revealing who she is and how she has developed and grown as a person.
