= Kinji Akagawa =

American artist

- Born: 1940-07-01; Tokyo, Japan
- Education: Cranbrook Academy of Art, Bloomfield Hills, Michigan; Tamarind Lithography Workshop, Los Angeles; Minneapolis College of Art and Design (BFA); University of Minnesota-Minneapolis (MFA)
- Known for: Sculpture, Public art, Printmaking
- Notable work: Walker Art Center, Minneapolis, Smithsonian Institution, Washington, D.C.
- Movement: Public art, Environmental art
- Awards: 2007 McKnight Distinguished Artist Award

Kinji Akagawa (born 1940, Tokyo, Japan) is an American sculptor, printmaker, and arts educator best known for sculptural constructions that also serve a practical function. A pioneer in the public art movement, Akagawa has throughout his career examined the relationship between art and community, most notably the concept of art as a process of inquiry. His sculpture and public artworks are noted for their refined elegance and use of natural materials, such as granite, basalt, field stone, cedar, and ipe wood.

Akagawa trained at the Cranbrook Academy of Art, Bloomfield Hills, Michigan; Tamarind Lithography Workshop, Los Angeles; the Minneapolis College of Art and Design; and the University of Minnesota, Minneapolis, where he earned an MFA degree in 1969.

From 1973 to 2009, Akagawa was a professor at the Minneapolis College of Art and Design (MCAD), where he taught sculpture, printmaking, photography, video, installation and conceptual art.

Akagawa's work is exhibited nationally and internationally and is found in numerous public and private collections, including the National Gallery of Art, Washington, D.C.; the Smithsonian Institution, Washington, D.C.; the Los Angeles County Museum of Art; Norton Simon Museum, Pasadena, California; Minneapolis Institute of Art; the Walker Art Center, Minneapolis; the University of Iowa Museum of Art, Iowa City; and the Ackland Art Museum, Chapel Hill, N.C.

Notable public artworks include "Peace Garden Bridge" (2009), a collaboration with American architect Jerry Allan, in the Lyndale Park Peace Garden, Minneapolis; "Garden Seating, Thinking, Reading" (1987), in the Minneapolis Sculpture Garden; "Bayou Sculpture" (1985), Houston, Texas; and "Four Seasons with a Sundial" (1984), Tettegouche State Park, near Silver Bay, Minnesota.

Akagawa's awards and recognitions include the McKnight Foundation Distinguished Artist Award (2007); Minnesota State Arts Board cultural collaborations grant (1995); Carnegie Mellon Foundation faculty enrichment grant (1984); McKnight Foundation Artist Fellowship (1983); Bush Foundation Fellowship (1982); and a Ford Foundation Fellowship (1965).

Akagawa lives and maintains a studio in Afton, Minnesota. He is married to fiber artist Nancy Gipple.
