= June Wayne =

American painter, printmaker, tapestry innovator, educator and activist

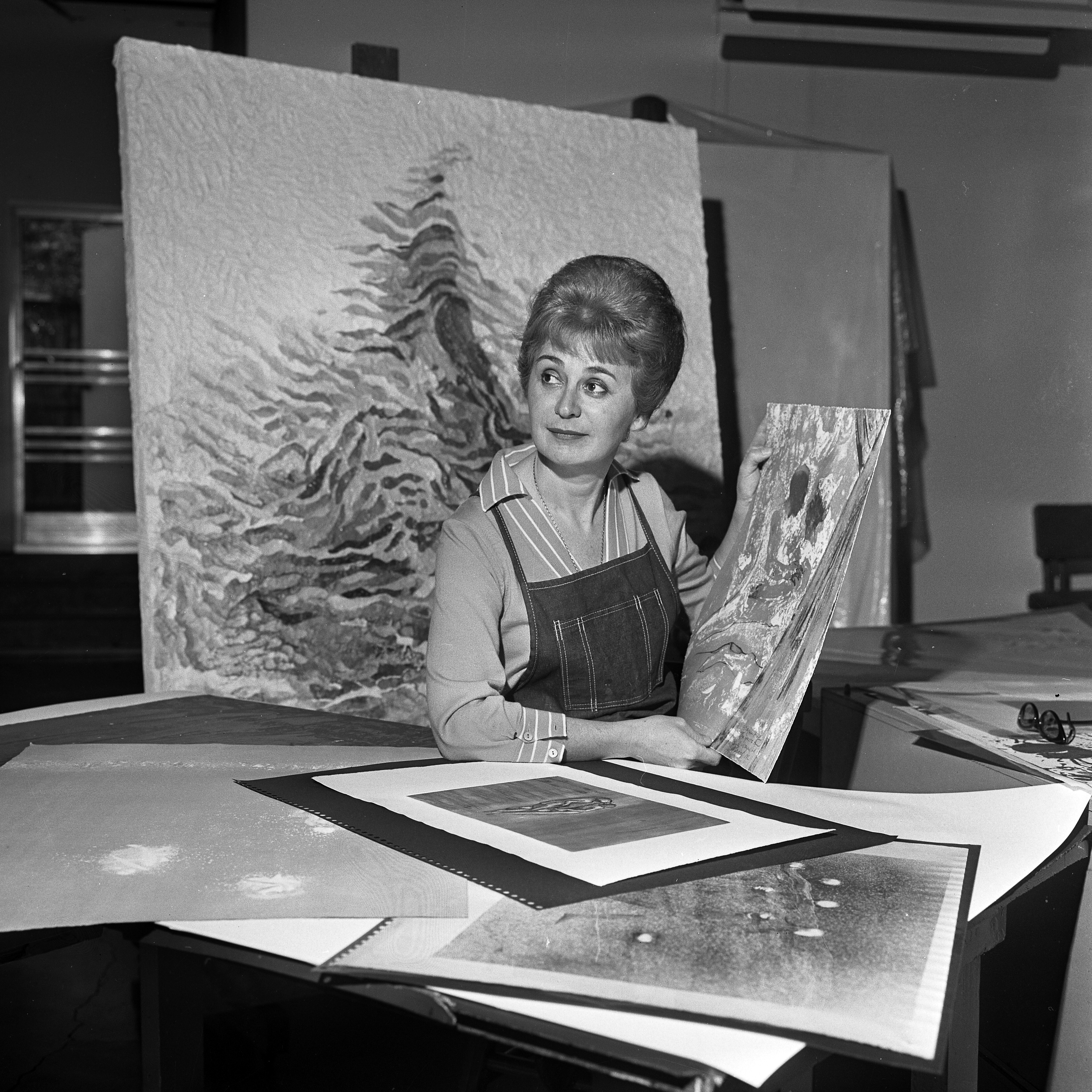
- Wayne in 1965
- Born: June Claire Kline; March 7, 1918; Chicago, Illinois
- Died: August 23, 2011 (aged 93); Los Angeles, California
- Known for: Printmaking, painting, tapestry innovation, social activism.
- Awards: Chevalier de L'Ordre des Arts et des Lettres (2011), Lifetime Achievement Awards from the College Art Association (2003), Los Angeles ArtCore (1997), and Neuberger Museum (1997)
- Website: https://www.junewayne.gallery/

June Claire Wayne (March 7, 1918 – August 23, 2011) was an American painter, printmaker, tapestry innovator, educator, and activist. She founded Tamarind Lithography Workshop (1960–1970), a then California-based nonprofit print shop dedicated to lithography.

== Early life and career ==
Wayne was born in Chicago on March 7, 1918, to Dorothy Alice Kline and Albert Lavine, but the marriage ended shortly after Wayne's birth and she was raised by her single mother and grandmother, both refugees from the violent antisemitism and pogroms of Belarus and Imperial Russia. Wayne had aspirations to be an artist and dropped out of high school at the age of fifteen to pursue this goal. Although she did not have formal artistic training, she began painting and had her first exhibition at the Boulevard Gallery in Chicago in 1935. At age seventeen, Wayne exhibited her watercolors under the name June Claire. She exhibited oil and water color paintings again the following year at the invitation of the Palacio de Bellas Artes in Mexico City. By 1938, she was employed as an artist for the WPA Easel Project in Chicago.

In 1939, Wayne moved to New York City, supporting herself as a jewelry designer by day and continuing to paint in her time off. She married Air Force surgeon George Wayne in 1940, and in 1942 he was deployed to serve in the European theater of World War II. While her husband was in Europe, Wayne first moved to Los Angeles and learned production illustration at Caltech, where she received training for work converting blueprints to drawings for the aircraft industry. She was then offered a job writing music continuity and war bond programs for radio station WGN in Chicago and moved there. She returned to Los Angeles when her husband came back to the States from overseas in 1944. The couple divorced in 1960, but the artist continued to use "June Wayne" as her professional identity for the rest of her life.

When World War II ended, Wayne returned to Los Angeles and became an active member of the California art scene. While continuing to paint and exhibit, she took up lithography in 1948 at Lynton Richards Kistler's facility, initially producing lithographs based on her paintings and then developing new imagery. In 1957, Wayne traveled to Paris to collaborate with French master printer Marcel Durassier, who was the printmaker for artists including Pablo Picasso, Henri Matisse, Salvador Dali, Marc Chagall and more, first on lithographs illustrating the love sonnets of English poet John Donne and then on an artist's book also based on Donne's poetry. "Her artist's book “Songs and Sonets” completed in December 1958, was among the first in the Parisian tradition to be produced by an American, let alone by an American woman". Wayne ultimately produced 123 copies of the finished book, one of which gained interest from Wilson MacNeil "Mac" Lowry, director of the arts and humanities programs at the Ford Foundation.

== Tamarind lithography workshop ==
When Wayne met with Lowry in 1958, she expressed frustration about having to go to Europe to find collaborators for her lithography projects, printmaking at the time in the US more associated with posters than fine art. Lowry suggested that she submit a proposal to the Ford Foundation seeking money to revitalize lithography in the U.S. With the foundation's assistance, Wayne opened the Tamarind Lithography Workshop (named for its street location in Hollywood), in 1960. Wayne acted as director, supported by the painter and printmaker Clinton Adams in the role of associate director and Garo Antreasian in the role of master printer and technical director.

Tamarind inspired a renaissance in American and world printmaking. Wayne insisted on the use of fine papers, small editions, and integrity in the publication, all intended to affirm that prints were a fine art form.

Artists were invited to two to three months residencies at Tamarind, where they would work with master printers, both American and European, to produce lithographs. Some artists, like Tamarind's first artist-in-residence, Romas Viesulas, already had experience as print makers, while others who came to Tamarind, such as Josef and Anni Albers, Ruth Asawa, Bruce Conner, Richard Diebenkorn, Burhan Doğançay, John Dowell, Claire Falkenstein, Sam Francis, Françoise Gilot, Philip Guston, Richard Hunt, Louise Nevelson, Ed Ruscha, Rufino Tamayo, Charles White, had worked primarily in other media. Tamarind Workshop was an educational institution intent on teaching lithography to American printers and Artists. Wayne, acutely aware of the underrepresentation of women and African Americans in the art world, made a point of including many in the Tamarind roster, rare at the time. The present idea of the American Printer/Artist collaboration began with June Wayne at Tamarind Workshop. In 1970, Wayne felt her mission was accomplished, resigned as director and arranged for the workshop's transfer to the University of New Mexico where, as the Tamarind Institute, it continues today.

== Art and science ==
“My work method is the scientific method” June Wayne asserted. “Being an artist is a lot like being a detective. The task of the artist is always to notice, digest, and comment on what is going on. We do it whether we’re aware of it or not. My model has always been Sherlock Holmes. I am always interested in the dog that didn’t bark in the night. What does a negative shape mean? I want to explore the thing you don’t know about.”

"The extraordinary advances in space exploration and genetics made during the mid-twentieth century were essential to Wayne’s artistic process and art, and her exploration of these new discoveries were unique. Her scientific knowledge came both from her reading and through her personal connections with leading scientists. In the 1950s she became friends with Harrison Brown, a nuclear physicist who taught at the California Institute of Technology. Friendships or associations with other scientists followed, including Richard Feynman, Jonas Salk, inventor of the Polio vaccine, and a number of contacts at the Jet Propulsion Laboratory, which became the world center for space exploration in the 1960s." “The artist roams those areas of modern thought where differences between art and science, art and music, or art and writing blur. This is where Wayne’s conceptual and technical innovations are apt to happen. She imagines the aesthetic meanings and shapes of ideas, whether in quantum physics, in fugues, or in the disturbances of perception due to optical interferences. She is also energized by structural possibilities as distinct as those in musical composition or the design of bridges and aircraft. The double helix of DNA itself was a source for several years of Wayne’ image making in the early 1970s.” “She depicted scientific discoveries in poetic rather than illustrative ways […] recognizing that too close a relationship to the facts work against the metaphysical and aesthetic potentials” (Jay Belloli)

== Innovation in tapestry ==
In 1971, after the transfer of Tamarind Lithography Workshop to the University of New Mexico, Wayne traveled to France. She had deep ties to the country, having created her John Donne series in the 50s there, and developed friendships with master printers such as Marcel Durassier, who was the printmaker for artists including Picasso, Matisse, Dali, Marc Chagall and more. Looking for new media, and encouraged by friend Madeleine Jarry, Inspecteur Principal du Mobilier National et des Manufactures des Gobelins et de Beauvais, Wayne began designing tapestries in France at the famed Gobelins factory. “June Wayne’s involvement with each and every aspect of the tapestry process was total—that is to say she did not just turn over her life-sized cartoons to one of the three studios involved in the selection of the woolen yarns and their spinning. Decisions as to their thickness and ply also concerned her, as did issues about their precise shading and hues when it came to dyeing of the yarns, the play of light and shade created through the individual stitches or points, and the intersections where the warp and weft threads interacted. She also made the cartoons in full scale, glueing them on muslim sheet for durability. Even after all aspects had been decided upon she did not disappear, leaving the weavers on their own. Instead, she returned often to check on their work and make sure that everything was progressing as she envisioned it.”

During her time collaborating with the French ateliers, Wayne created twelve tapestry images, all of which had fewer than four examples, and some destroyed as not to her liking. In the tapestry designs, Wayne continued to express her fascination with the connections between art, science, and politics, often creating designs based on images she had initially produced in other media. In using tapestries to convey contemporary themes, Wayne characteristically acted as the "fearless, multifaceted artist who accepted no limitations and who would venture toward anything that intrigued her, fascinated her, or caught her fancy.” (Christa C. Mayer Thurman, "June Wayne’s Narrative Tapestries: Tidal Waves, DNA, and the Cosmos”, The Art Institute of Chicago, 2010.) “June Wayne’s tapestries, magisterial in their conception and extraordinary in their refined beauty and execution, represent her decades of research into the intersection of art and science.” James Cuno, as President and Director of the Art Institute of Chicago. Curator Bernard Kester picked up on Wayne’s observations about time: “She chose tapestry because the element of time contained within the weaving process itself is cumulative, and remains implied in the result. The weaving of tapestry is intensive, rhythmical, and slow. In these characteristics, Wayne found a direct and appropriate way by which she could transmit to the viewer a sense of time passing that is internal to the process. She can lead the viewer beyond real time to read certain works at a quickened pace, or to perceive others in extended cosmic time.”

== Painting and mixed media ==
In 1984, Wayne returned to painting, the medium with which she had begun her career in Chicago, and Mexico City as a young artist. “In the Cognitos Series (later referred to as the Djuna Set), she painted on canvases prepared years earlier by Douglass Howell, the accomplished papermaker, who built thick, highly textured surfaces from mixtures of gesso, gelatin, and paper; half of them painted over previously existing paintings.” In a general way they alluded to planetary atmospheres and topographies, and were often monochromatic. As to her frequent use of the color black, Wayne explained, “To me black is the most noble color. Black allows anything to happen, and imaginatively. It doesn't partake of those earthly cliches about what color means: red is blood, blue is sky, green is earth. Such assumptions skew how we look at art.”

Wayne further innovated in the painting medium with her "Quake Series" created between 1992–95, exploring the seismic events so much a part of Southern California life. Wayne devised her own "highly textured surfaces from styrene modules used for packing shipping crates, the ubiquitous styrofoam “peanut”. Easily cut, shaped, glued, and painted, these modules allowed her to compose fields combining uniformity and variety. They also continued her tradition of using the most commonplace objects to achieve uncommon aesthetic effects.” Similar materials were used by Wayne in later canvases, including in “Propellar”, the monumental canvas she was working on until her death in 2011.

== Feminist art movement and "Joan of Art" seminars ==
Wayne “was angered by the sexist situation in the art world: ‘When are women going to be just artists instead of women-artists?’”. This conviction motivated Wayne's involvement in the feminist art movement in California in the 1970s. Wayne conceived and taught a series of professionalization seminars entitled "Joan of Art" to young women artists beginning around 1971. Wayne's seminars covered various topics related to being a professional artist, such as pricing work and approaching galleries, and involved role-playing and discussion sessions. They also encouraged giving back to the feminist community since graduates of Wayne's seminars were required to then teach the seminars to other women. Artist Faith Wilding wrote in 1977 that upon interviewing many of Wayne's former students, "all agreed that it had made a tremendous difference in their professional lives and careers, that in fact, it had been the turning point for some of them in making the step from amateur to professional."

In 1972, Wayne commissioned, and Tamarind Lithography Workshop published, "Sex Differentials in Art Exhibition Reviews: A Statistical Study” by Rosalie Braeutigam and Betty Fiske, a study which showed the scope of gender inequity. The 132 page study investigated through empirical data the scope of inequity faced by women in the arts. Periodicals examined included the New York Times, the Los Angeles Times, the San Francisco Chronicle, Artforum, ARTnews, Art in America, and others. Publication caused an uproar, a typical headline reading “She Draws Bead on Artworld”. As Wayne stated: “In 1959 women artists were covered by one line of critical text to male artists’ 10,000 lines. ARTnews gave 99% of its coverage to men. We charted this at Tamarind. Things haven’t changed much.”

Along with fellow artists Sheila Levrant de Bretteville, Ruth Weisberg, and others, Wayne was a founding member of the Los Angeles Council of Women in the Arts, which sought the equal representation of women artists in museum exhibitions. She was also part of the selection committee for the exhibition Contemporary Issues: Works on Paper by Women, which opened at the Los Angeles Woman's Building in 1977 and featured the works of over 200 women artists.

Among Wayne's pupils was Faith Bromberg, who would go on to be involved in the feminist art movement herself.

Mary Beth Edelson's Some Living American Women Artists / Last Supper (1972) appropriated Leonardo da Vinci’s The Last Supper, with the heads of notable women artists collaged over the heads of Christ and his apostles; Wayne was among those notable women artists. This image, addressing the role of religious and art historical iconography in the subordination of women, became "one of the most iconic images of the feminist art movement."

== Free speech activism ==
From her early years, Wayne was an advocate for free-speech and an opponent of State censorship. After Joseph McCarthy was reelected to the US Senate in 1952, the Los Angeles City Council passed a resolution by a vote of 13-1 calling modern artists “unwitting tools of the Kremlin”. Wayne attended Council meetings to oppose the resolution, and actions of the group “Sanity in Art”. In the same period, "the City wanted to cause anybody who modeled for an art school to prove that they weren’t prostitutes." In 1990 Wayne helped lead the charge against attempts in Congress by Rep. Philip Crane (Ill.) and others to abolish the National Endowment for the Arts. As Wayne stated: “Artists are taxpayers. We are entitled to due process. We are entitled to be free of defamation. The arts of this country are among the few positive cash flows we have in international trade. And I think that’s quite a lot of accountability.”

== Select museum exhibitions ==
Wayne's art has been exhibited worldwide, including:

- Whitney Museum of American Art, New York, 1955;
- Museu de Arte Moderna de São Paulo, 1955;
- Modern Art in the United States, Paintings, Sculptures and Prints: A Selection from the Collections of the Museum of Modern Art, Tate, London, 1956;
- Brooklyn Museum, 1957;
- Denver Art Museum, 1959;
- Santa Barbara Museum of Art, 1964;
- Library of Congress, Washington, D.C., 1966;
- Fresno Art Museum, 1986;
- National Gallery of Australia, Canberra, 1986;
- National Portrait Gallery, Washington, D.C., 1987;
- Whitney Museum of American Art, Stamford, Connecticut, 1988;
- Walker Art Center, Minneapolis, 1989;
- Bibliothèque nationale de France, Paris, 1992;
- Skirball Cultural Center, Los Angeles, 1996;
- June Wayne and the Cosmos: Stellar Winds, My Palomar, and Solar Flares, New York Academy of Sciences, 1997;
- Birmingham Museums and Art Gallery, Birmingham, United Kingdom, 1997;
- June Wayne: A Retrospective, Neuberger Museum of Art, Purchase College, State University of New York, 1997;
- The Djuna Set, Fresno Art Museum, 1988;
- Cincinnati Art Museum, 1998;
- June Wayne: The Dorothy Series, Skirball Museum, Hebrew Union College, Cincinnati, 1998;
- June Wayne: A Retrospective, Los Angeles County Museum of Art, Los Angeles, 1998-1999;
- June Wayne: A Retrospective, Palm Springs Desert Museum, Palm Springs, 1999;
- Shock Wave, Rutgers University, New Brunswick, 2005;
- June Wayne, Pioneer Lithographer, Birmingham Museums and Art Gallery, Birmingham, 2006;
- June Wayne's Narrative Tapestries: Tidal Waves, DNA, and the Cosmos, The Art Institute of Chicago, 2010;
- June Wayne’s Paintings, Prints, and Tapestries, Pasadena Museum of California Art, 2014;
- MOCA Jacksonville, The Other: Nurturing a New Ecology in Printmaking, 2016;
- Change Agent: June Wayne and the Tamarind Workshop, Arizona State University Art Museum, 2019–20;

== Select collections ==
June Wayne's work is well represented in major museums and private collections throughout the world. A partial list of museum collections include:

- the Amon Carter Museum;
- the Art Institute of Chicago;
- the Arizona State University Art Museum;
- the Bibliothèque nationale de France;
- the British Museum;
- the Brodsky Center, Rutgers University;
- the Fresno Art Museum;
- the Grunwald Center for the Graphic Arts, Hammer Museum;
- the Houghton Library, Harvard University;
- the Jewish Museum, New York;
- the Library of Congress, Washington, D.C.;
- the Los Angeles County Museum of Art;
- the Museum of Contemporary Art, San Diego;
- the Museum of Modern Art;
- the National Gallery of Art, Washington, D.C.;
- the National Gallery of Australia, Canberra;
- the National Museum of American History;
- the National Museum of Women in the Arts;
- the Neuberger Museum of Art;
- the New York Public Library;
- the Norton Simon Museum;
- the Philadelphia Museum of Art;
- the Pomona College Museum of Art;
- the Princeton University Library;
- the Queensland Art Gallery;
- the San Diego Museum of Art;
- the Skirball Cultural Center;
- the Smithsonian American Art Museum;
- the Victoria and Albert Museum;
- the Whitney Museum of American Art;
- the Zimmerli Art Museum.

== Awards ==
In 1982, Wayne was among the first recipients of the Vesta award, a newly created annual award the Los Angeles Woman's Building bestowed on women who had made outstanding contributions to the arts. In 1999 at the time of her retrospective at LACMA Wayne was honored by the Los Angeles City Council with the official proclamation initiated and sponsored by then Councilman Joel Wachs. In the 1990s, Wayne won the Art Table Award for Professional Contributions to the Visual Arts, the International Women's Forum Award for Women Who Make a Difference, and Lifetime Achievement Awards from both the Neuberger Museum of Art and LA ArtCore. In 2003, she was honored with the Zimmerli Lifetime Achievement Award from the College Art Association and in 2009 received awards from three institutions—the Pollock-Krasner Foundation, the Center for the Study of Political Graphics, and the Roski School of Fine Arts at the University of Southern California—as well as commendations from the City of West Hollywood and Los Angeles County. She was awarded honorary doctorates from the Rhode Island School of Design, Moore College of Art and Design, California College of Arts and Crafts, and The Atlanta College of Fine Arts. On April 4, 2011, she was named Chevalier de L'Ordre des Arts et des Lettres by then France Minister of Culture Frédéric Mitterrand. In 2018, at the centenary of her birth, Wayne was honored by the Los Angeles City Council with an official proclamation.

== Final years ==
Despite a decade long battle with cancer, Wayne continued to work actively in her Tamarind art studio into her nineties. Amongst her projects was the monumental styrene painting “Propellar”, which embodied many of her ideas about motion, optics, and the cosmos. In 2002, Wayne became a research professor at the Rutgers Center for Innovative Print and Paper. Wayne also donated a group of over 3,300 prints, both her work and the work of other artists, to the Rutgers Center for Innovative Print and Paper, which established the June Wayne Study Center and Archive to house the collection.

June Wayne's closest Los Angeles friends and collectors gathered in 1998 for "June in June" an 80th birthday luncheon honoring June Wayne. In attendance was David Hockney, Wallis Annenberg and a total of 70 celebrants. The event, organized by Robert and Barbara Barrett was organized to honor Wayne and raise funds to purchase June Wayne work for the Los Angeles County Museum of Art collection. Ten years later LACMA would recognize the breadth of her work with a retrospective. At age 92 Wayne attended “June Wayne’s Narrative Tapestries: Tidal, DNA, and the Cosmos” held at the Art Institute of Chicago in 2010.

Wayne died at her Tamarind Avenue studio in Hollywood on August 23, 2011, with her daughter and granddaughter by her side.

== See also ==
- Four Stones for Kanemitsu, a documentary film set at the Tamarind Lithography Workshop
