= Leonard Edmondson =

American Abstract expressionist painter and printmaker

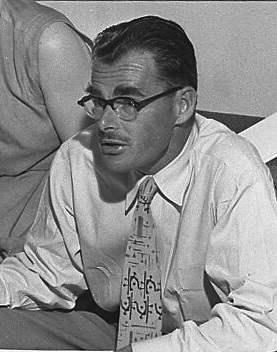
- Edmondson, 1952
- Born: June 12, 1916; Sacramento, California
- Died: July 23, 2002 (aged 86); West Covina, California
- Known for: Artist, Educator
- Movement: Abstract expressionism
- Spouse(s): Grace Waegell, Gail Jacobs

Leonard Edmondson (1916-2002) was an American Abstract expressionist painter and printmaker.

== Biography ==
Edmondson was born on June 12, 1916, in Sacramento, California. He attended the Los Angeles City College and then the University of California, Berkeley where he earned both his B.A. and M.A.. He went on to serve in the Military Intelligence Corps (United States Army) from 1942 through 1946.

When he left the Army and returned to California he began his teaching career at Pasadena City College. He later taught at the Otis Art Institute and California State University, Los Angeles. In 1962, Edmondson was a founding member of the Los Angeles Printmaking Society. In 1973, his book "Etching" (ISBN 0442222351) was published.

== Exhibitions ==
In 1950 Edmondson had his first solo show at the Felix Landau Gallery followed by shows at the de Young Museum and the Pasadena Museum of California Art. In 1960 Edmondson was the recipient of a Guggenheim Fellowship. An interview with Edmondson was included in the 1966-1967 "Art and Artists" radio program series which is archived at the Smithsonian Institution's Archives of American Art.

== Personal life ==
In 1943, while stationed at Fort Sumner, in a letter to his first wife, he expressed his ambition to "study under a top-notch artist" as a path toward becoming an art teacher, and "prescient conviction about painting", amongst more mundane concerns. Edmondson became life long friends with classmate Ynez Johnston.

== Legacy ==
Edmondson's work is in the collections of the Brooklyn Museum the National Gallery of Art, the Metropolitan Museum of Art.

Edmondson died on July 23, 2002, in West Covina, California.
