= Richard Callner =

American painter (1927–2007)

Richard Callner (May 18, 1927 – August 31, 2007) was a 20th-century American painter. His early work was related to the Chicago Monster School of the 1950s. Later, he was known for his intricately patterned interiors and landscapes. His career as an artist/teacher spanned a period of 50 years.

== Early life ==
Richard Callner was born on May 18, 1927, in Benton Harbor, Michigan. He spent most of his childhood in Chicago during the Great Depression. At the age of 17, during World War II, Callner dropped out of school and enlisted in the Navy. Against his family's wishes that he prepare himself to enter his father's lumber business he switched to the study of Art under G.I. Bill at the University of Wisconsin, Madison.

=== Training ===
From Wisconsin Callner moved to Paris for a brief period and studied at the Académie Julian. He returned to Wisconsin to finish a bachelor's degree, and then made his way to New York City to study at the Art Students League of New York. He received a MFA from Columbia University in 1952. Callner secured a teaching position at Purdue University and in 1959 Callner was awarded a Guggenheim Fellowship to paint in France and England.

== Career ==
Callner began his career as a studio art professor at Purdue University in West Lafayette, Indiana. After a year abroad, he returned to teach at Olivet College in Michigan, and then to the Tyler School of Art in Philadelphia. In 1966 he and his family moved to Italy where he served as the founding director of the Tyler School of Art in Rome. He left the Tyler School of Art and from 1975 to 1981, Callner served as head of the art department at the State University of New York at Albany. He played a key role establishing the school's MFA program in 1977, and taught graduate level courses until his retirement in 1991. He also held a Fulbright professorship in Yugoslavia, had exhibitions and gave lectures under the auspices of the USIS in Germany, Finland, Hungary, Turkey, and Russia.

== Later life ==
Callner's works are included in the Hermitage Museum, St. Petersburg, Russia; Museum of Painting and Sculpture, Istanbul, Turkey; the Gallery of Modern Art, Pristina, Yugoslavia; the Albany Institute of History and Art; The Art Institute of Chicago; The Detroit Institute of Arts; the Philadelphia Museum of Art; the New York Public Library; Yale University Art Gallery; Cincinnati Art Museum; and the Worcester Art Museum and other private collections. In 2003 the Albany Institute of History and Art held a 50-year retrospective of his work not only as tribute to his career but also to acknowledge his influence and contribution to the cultural fabric of the region.

=== Death ===
Callner was diagnosed with Parkinson's disease in 1982. He continued to create and produce his art until a few days before his death on August 30, 2007.
