= Emerson Woelffer =

American artist and arts educator (1914–2003)

Emerson Seville Woelffer
- Emerson Woelffer, Untitled, oil on canvas, 1949, private collection
- Born: July 27, 1914; Chicago, Illinois, United States
- Died: February 2, 2003 (aged 88)
- Education: Art Institute of Chicago
- Known for: Painting
- Movement: Abstract expressionism
- Spouse(s): Dina Anderson (m. 1945–1990; death), Marilu Lopez (m. 1996–2003; death)

Emerson Seville Woelffer (July 27, 1914 – February 2, 2003), was an American artist and arts educator. He was known as a prominent abstract expressionist artist and painter and taught art at some of the most prestigious colleges and universities. Woelffer was one of the important people in bringing modernism to Los Angeles, when he taught at Chouinard Art Institute.

== Biography ==
Woelffer was born July 27, 1914, in Chicago, Illinois. He studied at the Art Institute of Chicago between 1935 and 1937, with László Moholy-Nagy.

In 1938 he joined the WPA Arts Program. After serving in the US Air Force, from 1942 until 1949, he taught at Art Institute of Chicago. At the request of Buckminster Fuller, in 1949 he taught at Black Mountain College. In 1954 he taught at the Colorado Springs Fine Arts Center.

In 1959 he and his wife Dina moved to Los Angeles, California, where they settled down in the Mount Washington neighborhood. From 1959 to 1973 he taught at the Chouinard Art Institute (now known as California Institute of the Arts) in Valencia, California.

From 1974 and 1992 he taught at The Otis Art Institute (now called Otis College of Art and Design) in Los Angeles, serving as Chair of the Painting Department from 1974 to 1978. In 1991 he received an Honorary Doctorate Degree from Otis College of Art and Design in Los Angeles. He felt such a strong attachment to Otis that he left his estate to the college in the form of an endowment, to set up a scholarship fund to benefit future artists.

Woelffer is best known for his boldly colored abstract paintings and collages with jagged forms. He also created sculpture and lithographs. Late in his career―suffering from macular degeneration―he began working in white crayon on black paper.

== Death and legacy ==
He died in Los Angeles, California in 2003.

Woelffer's work is held in many public museum collections including at Colorado Springs Fine Arts Center, Honolulu Museum of Art, the Montana Historical Society (Helena, Montana), Museum of Art (Brigham Young University, Provo, Utah), Museum of Contemporary Art San Diego, Neuberger Museum of Art, Oklahoma City Museum of Art, Portland Art Museum, San Diego Museum of Art, Yellowstone Art Museum (Billings, Montana), Asheville Art Museum, Black Mountain College Museum + Art Center, and San Francisco Museum of Modern Art (SFMoMA).

== Personal life ==
In 1945 he married Dina Anderson, a photographer. Woelffer’s wife, Dina, died in 1990 and he married Marilu Lopez in 1996.

== Awards and fellowships ==
- 1967 – Guggenheim Fellowship, Field of Study: Fine Arts (used for travel to Paris)
- 1974 – Artist Grant, National Endowment for the Arts (NEA)
- 1984 – Pollock–Krasner Grant
- 1988 – Francis J. Greenburger Award (in conjunction with the Guggenheim Museum, New York City)
- 1991 – Honorary Doctorate Degree, Otis College of Art and Design
