= Clinton Adams =

American artist (1918–2002)

- Born: December 11, 1918; Glendale, California, U.S.
- Died: May 13, 2002 (aged 83); Albuquerque, New Mexico, U.S.
- Known for: Painting; Printmaking
- Elected: National Academy (1992)

Clinton Adams (December 11, 1918 – May 13, 2002) was an American artist and art historian. He was known for his contributions to the field of lithography.

== Biography ==
Adams was born in Glendale, California. He worked in the art department of the University of California, Los Angeles, (UCLA) but eventually left to serve in the military. He returned to UCLA in 1946. From 1961 to 1976, he was the Dean of the University of New Mexico.

As a painter, Adams worked in several mediums, including oil, acrylic, watercolor painting, and egg tempera. He also produced lithographs, and was the co-author of The Tamarind Book of Lithography (1971), an important description of the process. Among his other writings is American Lithographers (1987), a history of the art in the United States from 1900 to 1960.

Adams received the Governor's Award for "Outstanding Contributions to the Arts of New Mexico" in 1985, and in 1992 he became a member of the National Academy of Design. He died of liver cancer on May 13, 2002, in Albuquerque, New Mexico.
